= Red Lorry Yellow Lorry discography =

- Studio albums: 6
- EPs: 4
- Compilation albums: 6
- Singles: 16
- Video albums: 1

This is the discography of British post-punk band Red Lorry Yellow Lorry.

== Albums ==
=== Studio albums ===
Title	Album details	Peak chart positions
Title	Album details	UK Indie
Talk About the Weather	Released: January 1985; Label: Red Rhino; Formats: LP	3
Paint Your Wagon	Released: 7 March 1986; Label: Red Rhino; Formats: LP, MC	1
Nothing Wrong	Released: May 1988; Label: Situation Two; Formats: CD, LP, MC	3
Blow	Released: 18 September 1989; Label: Situation Two; Formats: CD, LP, MC	6
Blasting Off	Released: 5 October 1992; Label: Deathwish Office; Formats: CD, LP	—
Strange Kind of Paradise	Released: July 2025; Label: COP International; Formats: CD, LP, digital download, streaming	—
"—" denotes releases that did not chart

=== Compilation albums ===
Title	Album details	Peak chart positions
Title	Album details	UK Indie
Smashed Hits	Released: 15 January 1988; Label: Red Rhino; Formats: CD, LP, MC	10
The Singles 1982–87	Released: February 1994; Label: Cherry Red; Formats: CD	—
Generation – The Best Of	Released: 1994; Label: Cleopatra; Formats: CD; US-only release	—
The Very Best of Red Lorry Yellow Lorry	Released: 25 April 2000; Label: Cherry Red; Formats: CD	—
See the Fire – Albums, Singles and BBC Recordings 1982–1987	Released: 24 November 2014; Label: Cherry Red; Formats: 3xCD	—
Albums and Singles 1982–1989	Released: 24 February 2017; Label: Cherry Red; Formats: 4xCD box set	—
"—" denotes releases that did not chart.

=== Video albums ===
Title	Album details
Thunder in the Black Cave	Released: 2005; Label: Self-released; Formats: DVD; Limited release

== EPs ==
Title	Album details	Peak chart positions
Title	Album details	UK Indie
This Today	Released: February 1984; Label: Red Rhino	18
Crawling Mantra	Released: May 1987; Label: Red Rhino, Homestead; As well as being released as a 7" single, it was released as a 2x7", 12" and on cassette	—
Black Tracks	Released: 2004; Label: Self-released	—
Red Lorry Yellow Lorry	Released: 29 August 2015; Label: Self-released; Limited release	—
"—" denotes releases that did not chart.

== Singles ==
Title	Year	Peak chart positions	Album
Title	Year	UK Indie	Album
"Beating My Head"	1982	—	Non-album singles
"Take It All"	1983	23	Non-album singles
"He's Read"	1983	20	Non-album singles
"Monkey's on Juice"	1984	3	Non-album singles
"Hollow Eyes"	1984	6	Talk About the Weather
"Chance"	1985	11	Non-album singles
"Spinning Around"	1985	9	Non-album singles
"Paint Your Wagon"	1986	—	Paint Your Wagon
"Walking on Your Hands"	1986	21	Paint Your Wagon
"Cut Down"	1986	6	Non-album singles
"Crawling Mantra" (as the Lorries)	1987	3	Non-album singles
"Open Up"	1987	6	Nothing Wrong
"Nothing Wrong"	1988	5	Nothing Wrong
"Only Dreaming (Wide Awake)"	1988	9	Nothing Wrong
"Temptation"	1989	13	Blow
"Talking Back"	1991	—	Blasting Off
"—" denotes releases that did not chart.
