= Harrogate Grammar School =

Location
- Arthurs Avenue; Harrogate, North Yorkshire, HG2 9HU; England; 53.98010°N 1.5473°W

Information
- Type: Academy
- Motto: Arx Celebris Fontibus
- Established: 1903
- Department for Education URN: 136497 Tables
- Ofsted: Reports
- Headteacher: Neil Renton
- Staff: 120
- Age: 11 to 18
- Enrolment: 2,021
- Houses: Ventus, Terra, Ignis and Aqua
- Sixth form: 460
- Website: www.harrogategrammar.co.uk

Harrogate Grammar School is a co-educational academy school and sixth form in Harrogate, North Yorkshire, England. It has around 1,900 pupils in the main school. A 2022 Ofsted inspection rated the school as 'Outstanding' in all five areas of the Ofsted framework

== History ==
Harrogate Grammar School traces its origins to the Municipal Secondary Day School, which opened in Harrogate in 1903. The school initially occupied rented premises in Haywra Crescent and opened with 44 pupils. By the time the school became a Grammar School in 1931 the original roll of 44 pupils had grown to 530, and the school had outgrown its premises. Work began on the new grammar school in Arthurs Avenue and the staff and pupils transferred in 1933.

=== Expansion ===
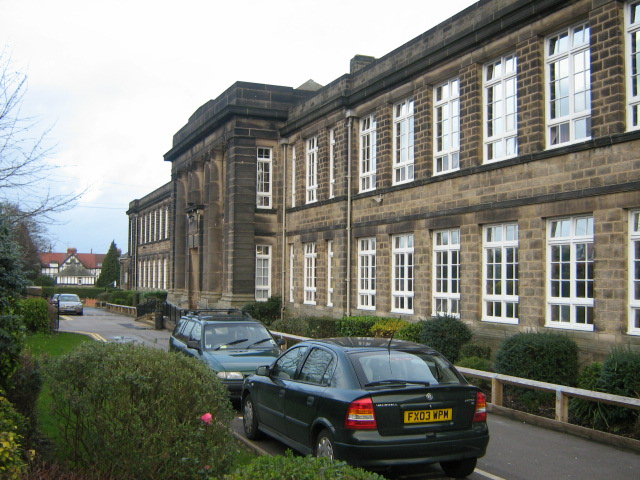
The main 1933 building

During the Second World War, many evacuees came to Harrogate from the cities, and the school's roll went up to 900 pupils. To keep pace with these numbers, the school undertook various periods of building expansion, most notably the 1970s addition of a sports hall and gymnasium, as well as music, reflexology and technology facilities.

=== Sixth Form ===
The school has undergone a period of growth in its Sixth Form and now has around 540 students on roll. The increased provision for Sixth Form began in the 1970s when a dedicated Sixth Form block was added. In 1973 the school was converted into a comprehensive school and, although it was no longer a grammar school, continued to use that title in its name.

The sixth form was further extended in 2013 as The Sherwood Wing, named after Mrs Jan Sherwood, a former Sixth Form Director, for her contribution to the school.

The school was named in July 2019 as a computing hub for the National Centre for Computing Education.

=== Specialist language status ===
In 2002 Harrogate Grammar School was given Specialist Language Status. In 2006 the school was recognised as a successful specialist school and was invited to take on a second specialism in technology.

=== Academy and National Teaching School status ===
In 2011, following the government's plans to turn high performing comprehensive schools in the UK into academies, the school was granted academy status. The school operated an independent academy trust until the formation of the Red Kite Learning Trust (RKLT) in late 2015. The RKLT formed as a multi-academy trust (MAT) with partner schools, including nearby primary schools and Prince Henry's Grammar School in Otley who had already been linked through the Red Kite Alliance (RKA), a group of schools through which teaching and learning development is shared.

The Learning Trust and Alliance is based at Harrogate Grammar School and they coordinate events, conferences, networking and School Centred Initial Teacher Training (SCITT) through Red Kite Teacher Training thanks to the status of Harrogate Grammar as a National Teaching School.

== Staff ==
The current headteacher is Neil Renton, who was appointed in January 2019 and succeeded Richard Sheriff in September 2019. Sheriff had served as headteacher since 2007 and subsequently continued his involvement with the school as the founding chief executive officer of the Red Kite Learning Trust, of which Harrogate Grammar School is a founding member. He retired from that role in February 2026.

== Motto ==
The school shares its motto with the town of Harrogate. "Arx Celebris Fontibus" translated from Latin as, "A citadel famous for its springs".

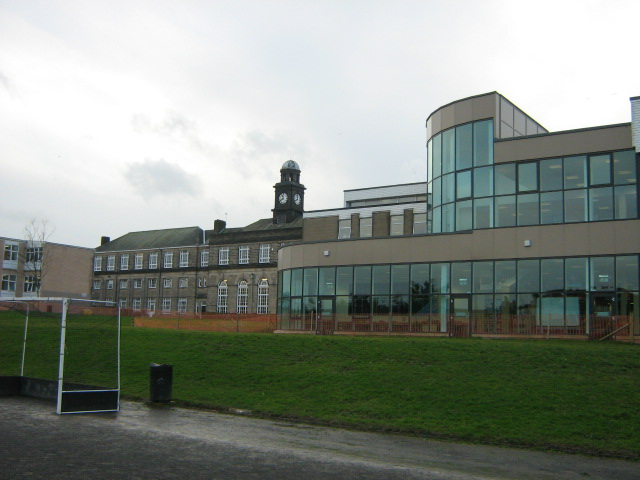
The new Library and Learning Support Building completed in 2007

== House system ==
The school operates a House system, introduced in the 1950s. It was later ended but reinstated in 2001. The current houses are: Ventus, Ignis, Terra and Aqua, representing the four classical elements.

== Bullying ==
In 1999, North Yorkshire County Council paid £6000 in an out-of-court settlement, "with no admission of liability" to a former pupil who stated that Harrogate Grammar School persistently failed to protect him from bullying. In 1999, the pupil and his mother founded the charity Bullying Online, now Bullying UK.

== Air Training Corps ==
On 17 February 1939, No 58 (Harrogate) Squadron of the Air Defence Cadet Corps was established at the school by the Air League of the British Empire. The squadron has since moved to separate premises and is no longer associated with the school. Pupils from the school are still active cadets within the squadron.

== Notable alumni ==
- Second Lieutenant Donald Bell, Army officer and professional footballer, awarded the Victoria Cross for his actions on the Somme in 1916.
- Andrew Brons, British National Party (BNP) MEP for Yorkshire and the Humber
- Stuart Colman – Record producer who worked with Shakin Stevens
- Jenny Duncalf – Professional squash player, having held Number 2 world ranking
- Luke Garbutt – Current professional footballer for England national under-21 football team and Everton.
- Rio Goldhammer – Frontman in post-punk band 1919, academic and former candidate for mayor of West Yorkshire.
- Richard Haley – Internationally recognised Nuclear Physicist, UK expert on "Criticality Incident Detection".
- Andrew Scarborough – Professional actor who has appeared in The Bill, Heartbeat and most notably starred in Downton Abbey. He and Hugo Speer also from the grammar school, starred together in the BBC comedy drama Hearts and Bones
- Hugo Speer- Professional actor who has appeared in The Bill, Heartbeat and most notably The Full Monty
- Phil Swainston – England Youth International and professional Rugby Union player for Premiership team London Wasps and Harlequins
- Martyn Wood – England international rugby union footballer.
- Michael Hayes - TV director, of shows including Doctor Who, Z-Cars, Maigret, All Creatures Great and Small, and A for Andromeda. Later became a BBC World Service newsreader.
- Sophie Wilson engineer
