= Burning Oil =

Studio album by Skeletal Family
- Released: 1984
- Recorded: 1984
- Genre: Gothic rock, alternative rock
- Label: Red Rhino Records

Skeletal Family chronology
Recollect (1984)	Burning Oil (1984)	Futile Combat (1985)

Professional ratings
Review scores
Source	Rating
Allmusic	link

Burning Oil is the first studio album by Skeletal Family, released in 1984. The band had been together less than two years when this album was released by the independent label Red Rhino Records. Tracks 11–13 are bonus tracks.

== Track listing ==
All lyrics written by Anne-Marie Hurst except "Ritual" (Karlheinz) and "Black Ju Ju" (Dunaway)

1. "So Sure" –
2. "Ritual" – 2:57
3. "Burning Oil" – 2:41
4. "The Wind Blows" – 4:13
5. "And I" – 3:37
6. "11:15" – 2:30
7. "Waiting Here" – 3:47
8. "Someone New" – 4:21
9. "Black Ju Ju" – 5:10
10. "Woman and Child" – 4:24
11. "Trees"
12. "Just a Friend"
13. "The Night"
