= Ghost Dance (band) =

British gothic rock band

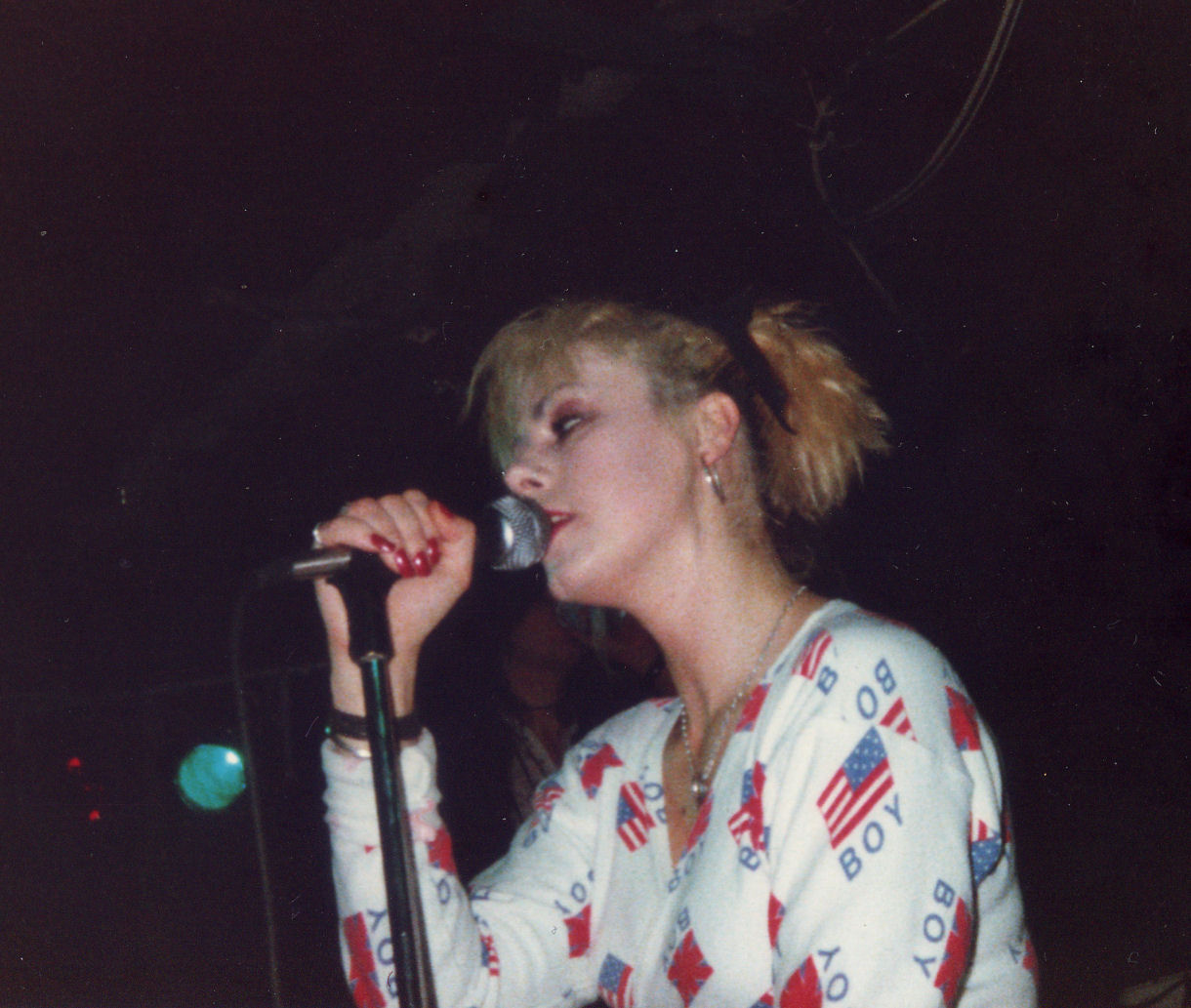
- Anne-Marie Hurst with Ghost Dance in 1989

Background information
- Origin: Leeds, England
- Genres: Gothic rock; post-punk
- Years active: 1985–1989, 2019–present
- Spinoff of: The Sisters of Mercy, Skeletal Family
- Members: Anne-Marie Hurst; Billy Lockwood
- Past members: Gary Marx; Paul Etchells; Steve Smith; Richard Steel; John Grant
- Website: https://ghost-dance.com

Ghost Dance is a British gothic rock band formed in 1985 by Gary Marx (ex-Sisters of Mercy guitarist) and Anne-Marie Hurst (ex-Skeletal Family vocalist) as both were leaving their respective bands. The band were originally signed to Nick Jones' record label, Karbon Records, then were later signed to the major label Chrysalis Records, before splitting up in 1989.

In 2019 the band reformed, with Hurst being joined by new members Tim Walker (guitar), Stephen Derrig (guitar), Phil Noble (bass), and Dave Wood (drums). They began work on new material. Reunion shows followed in the UK and the band signed to Voltage Records for a new album release in 2023.

== History ==
=== "River of No Return" ===
Bassist Paul "Etch" Etchells was hired, and with a drum machine nicknamed 'Pandora', the band set about releasing their debut 12" single, "River of No Return", featuring a cover of Roxy Music's song "Both Ends Burning". By Marx's own admission, the sound quality was poor. Nevertheless, the single was released in early 1986.

=== "Heart Full of Soul" ===
The second single to be released was "Heart Full of Soul", a cover of The Yardbirds' song. It was backed with a cover of Golden Earring's hit single "Radar Love". The 12" version of the single had a silver sleeve instead of the pale blue of the 7" single, as well as a bonus track on the A-side, a cover of Suzi Quatro's "Can The Can". The drums on this single were programmed by Etch, rather than Marx.

Steve Smith from Red Lorry Yellow Lorry had been helping the band live and occasionally in the studio, and on this single, contributed by adding backing vocals and extra guitars. After recording this single, he played some more gigs, until his final one in Wolverhampton, when he left the band to concentrate on his own project, Riprize.

=== "The Grip of Love" ===
"The Grip of Love" was the third single by Ghost Dance to be released in 1986. With the departure of Steve Smith, new guitarist Richard Steel played on this single. The 7" single A-side was "The Grip of Love (Bombay Mix)", and the B-side was "Where Spirits Fly". The 12" single omitted "Where Spirits Fly", and added "Last Train" to the A-side, and "A Deeper Blue" and "The Grip of Love (A Cheaper Blues Version)" to the B-side. All the tracks on the 12" version are in the key of D minor, hence the subtitle to the single "Suite in D Minor". The single's producer, Richard Mazda, also played harmonica on the "Cheaper Blues Version".

=== Leaving Karbon ===
In 1987, Ghost Dance released their final Karbon EP, A Word to the Wise. They had recruited drummer John Grant, with Daniel Mass from ex-Merciful Release band Salvation providing backing vocals on the A-side track "When I Call". This track was recorded in Amazon Studios, proving to be the most financially demanding track the band had recorded. Nevertheless, it was one of the first tracks the band had written.

The second A-side track was "Fools Gold" (written by Etch, one of the few tracks in Ghost Dance's discography not written by Marx), and the two B-sides were "Cruel Light" and "Holding On". Despite the success of "A Word to the Wise", the band had reached the end of their time with Karbon Records. The final release on Karbon was Gathering Dust, a compilation album of their singles to date. After leaving Karbon, their tour manager Simon "Sparky" Parker became their manager, and succeeded in securing Ghost Dance a recording contract with Chrysalis Records.

=== Chrysalis Records ===
The first release on Chrysalis was the single "Down to the Wire", which peaked at No. 66 in the UK Singles Chart in June 1989. The various issues of the singles included a live "Gathering Dust Medley" for the B-side. This was a live recording of "The Grip of Love" / "Last Train" / "Celebrate". A promotional German release of this single was released as 'Introducing Ghost Dance'. The band released their debut album, Stop the World (some copies coming with a bonus live 12" single), despite the tensions in the band growing. The label had wanted a re-recording of the early song "Celebrate", to be a new single, despite there having been a version of "Celebrate" on the B-side of the previous single.

The single's reception was "disastrous", and despite demoing new songs, such as "Rock It" and "Adrift Without You" with new manager Chris Cooke, the band slowly disintegrated, playing their final concert in Amsterdam, on 4 December 1989.

== Reformation ==
=== 2019–present ===
In 2019 Hurst formed a new version of Ghost Dance with ex-'Harlequyn' members Tim Walker, Dave Wood and Phil Noble, joined later by Stephen Derrig of 'Original Sin'. All four new members played several gigs as support to the original Ghost Dance line-up in the late 1980's.

After releasing two online only singles, the album 'The Silent Shout' was self released on 5 May 2023 worldwide through Voltage and Plastic Head distribution. The album was recorded at Bradford's Voltage Studios by Tim Walker. It went straight to the number one slot in iTunes 'goth rock' chart and was instantly high in Amazon's 'goth rock' best sellers.

In 2024, the band toured through the UK, Belgium, Scotland, Sweden, and Mexico, and in June 2025 performed at Gothic Pogo Festival XVIII in Germany.

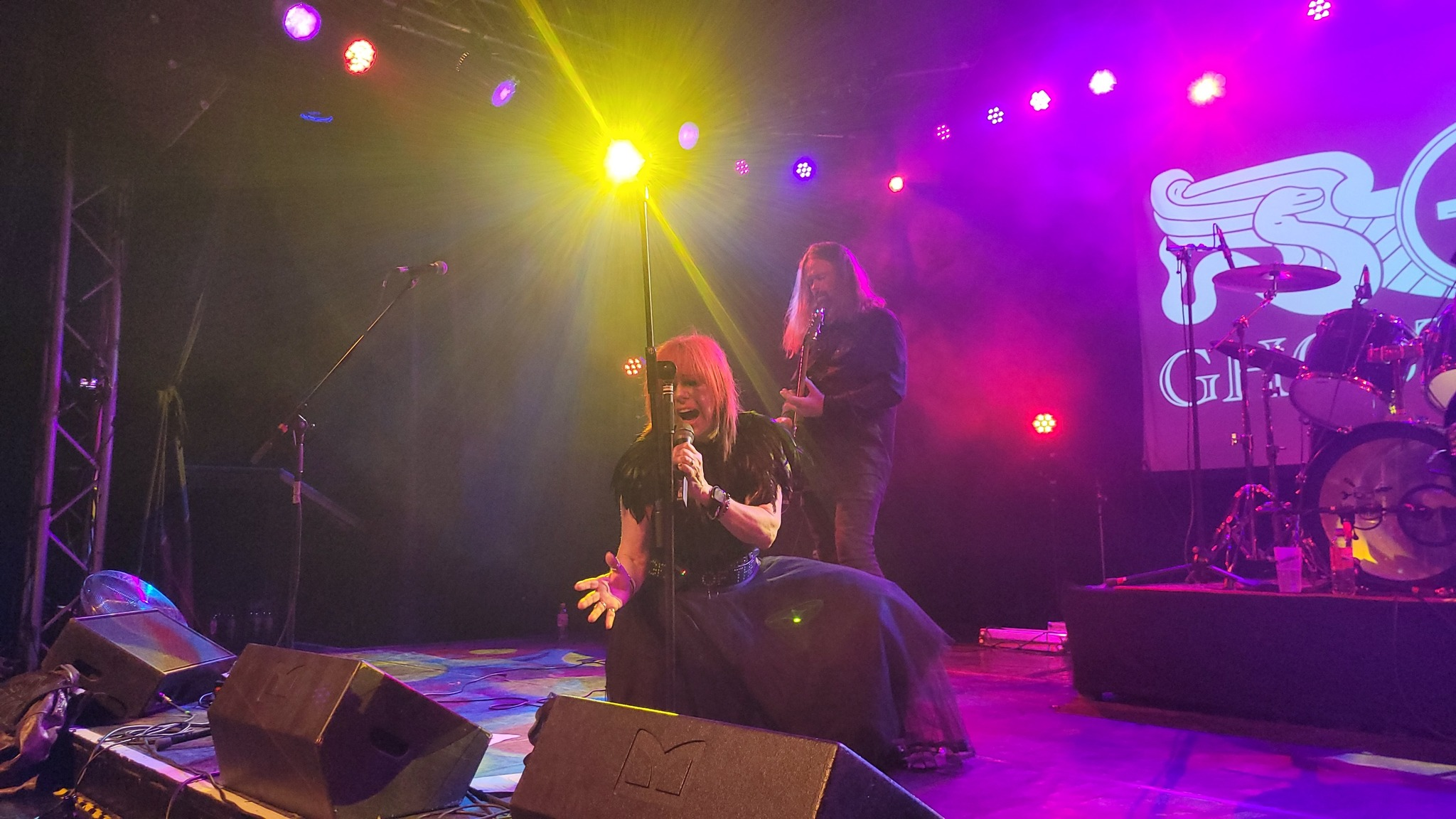
Ghost dance performing at Gothic Pogo Festival XVIII

The current lineup includes Anne-Marie as vocalist and Billy Lockwood on drums.

== Discography ==
Year	Title	Formats	Notes	Charts
1986	"River of No Return"	12"	compiled on Gathering Dust	#16 UK Indie Singles
1986	"Heart Full of Soul"	7", 12"	compiled on Gathering Dust	#4 UK Indie Singles
1986	"The Grip of Love"	7", 12"	compiled on Gathering Dust	#19 UK Indie Singles
1987	"A Word to the Wise"	12"		#92 UK Singles #4 UK Indie Singles
1988	"Gathering Dust"	LP, CR-r	compilation of 3 Karbon singles	#10 UK Indie Albums
1989	"Down to the Wire"	7", 12", CD	lead track on Stop the World	#66 UK Singles
1989	"Introducing Ghost Dance"	12"	German promotional single	
1989	Stop the World	LP, CD	Some LPs contain live 12" single.	
1989	"Celebrate"	7", 12", 12" Picture Disc, CD	title track on Stop the World	#85 UK Singles
2021	"Falling Down"	Download / streaming single	first single for Voltage Records UK	
2022	"Jessamine"	Download / streaming single	second single for Voltage Records UK	
2023	"The Silent Shout"	Download / CD album	Voltage Records UK / PHD worldwide	
