= 1919 (disambiguation) =

The year 1919 was a common year of the Gregorian calendar.

1919 may also refer to:

- 1919 (band), a post-punk British band
- 1919 (film), a 1985 British film
- 1919 (novel), a 1932 novel in the U.S.A. trilogy by John Dos Passos
- M1919 Browning machine gun

== See also ==
- The Unforgettable Year 1919, a 1951 Soviet film
- Paris 1919 (album), a 1973 album by John Cale
