= Simon Archer =

Simon Archer may refer to:

- Simon Archer (badminton) (born 1973), English badminton player
- Sir Simon Archer (antiquary) (1581–1662), English antiquary and politician
- Simon Archer (author) (1956/1957–1993), British journalist and biographer
- Simon "Ding" Archer (born 1966), English musician and producer
