= Paint Your Wagon =

Paint Your Wagon may refer to:

- Paint Your Wagon (musical), 1951–1952
  - Paint Your Wagon (film), a 1969 adaptation of the musical, starring Lee Marvin, Clint Eastwood, and Jean Seberg
- Paint Your Wagon (album), 1986, by Red Lorry Yellow Lorry
- "Paint Your Wagon", the twenty-fifth and last episode of the 2005 children's television series Muffin The Mule
