= Skeletal Family =

English rock band

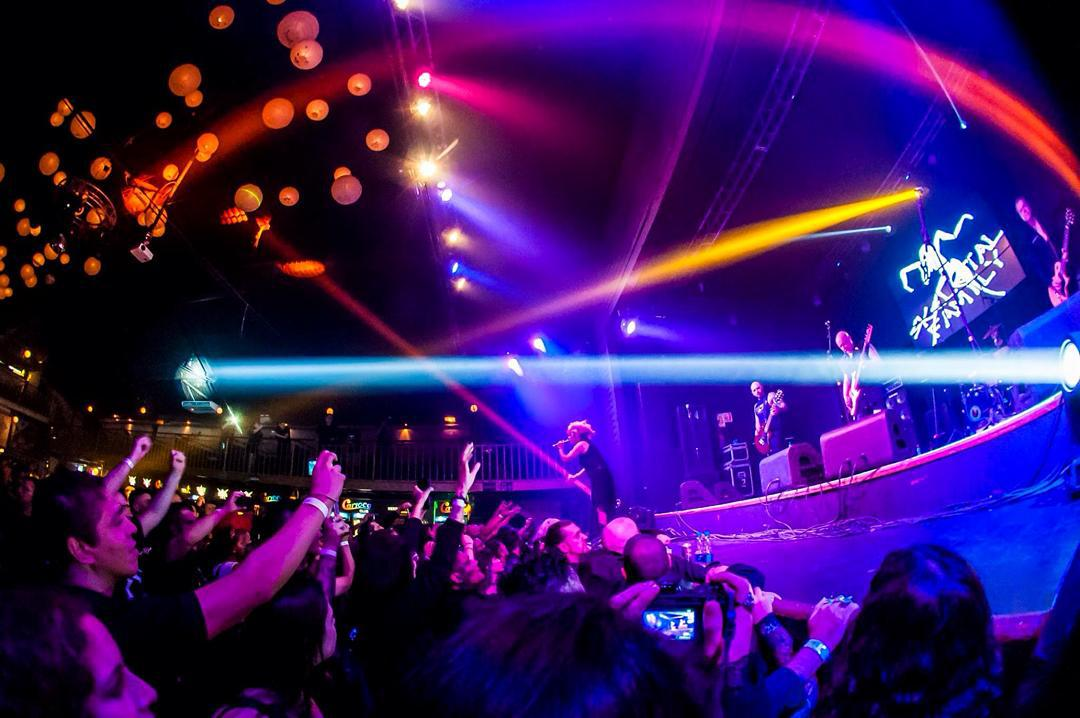

Background information
- Origin: Keighley, England
- Genres: Post-punk, gothic rock, deathrock
- Years active: 1982–1986, 2002–2009, 2012–present
- Labels: Red Rhino, Chrysalis, Gepek Records, Chapter 22
- Spinoffs: Ghost Dance, the Batfish Boys
- Past members: Steve Crane; Howard Daniels; Martin Henderson; Richard "Dik" Hawkins; Kevin Hunter; John Clarke; Katrina Phillips; Claire Bannister; Johnny Lorrimer; Owen Richards; Hannah Small; Anne-Marie Hurst
- Website: www.skeletalfamily.com

Skeletal Family are an English rock band formed in Keighley, West Yorkshire, in December 1982. The band was formed from the remaining members of an earlier group called the Elements, and took their name from the title of the song "Chant of the Ever Circling Skeletal Family" from the 1974 David Bowie album, Diamond Dogs.

== History ==
The original line-up of the band was Anne-Marie Hurst (vocals), Stan Greenwood (guitar), Roger "Trotwood" Nowell (bass guitar), Ian "Karl Heinz" Taylor (keyboard/saxophone) and Steve Crane (drums). In 1983, after their first single, "Trees", the band signed to independent record label Red Rhino Records. They recorded their first single for Red Rhino, "The Night", shortly after losing their original drummer Crane, who was replaced by Howard Daniels. Daniels soon left, joining My Pierrot Dolls, and was replaced by Martin Henderson (formerly of The Last Laugh). Skeletal Family's first album, Burning Oil, recorded in four days at a cost of £640, was released by Red Rhino in August 1984. It topped the UK Independent Chart, staying in the top 10 until the end of the year. The band began touring with the Sisters of Mercy during the Sisters' First and Last and Always tour. Skeletal Family released the Futile Combat album in 1985, along with the "Promised Land" single.

Hurst and Henderson left the band to develop new projects. Hurst eventually teamed up with Gary Marx (formerly of The Sisters of Mercy) in Ghost Dance. Henderson joined former The March Violets vocalist Simon Denbigh to create the Batfish Boys.

Former Colourfield backing vocalist Katrina Phillips replaced Hurst, while Kevin Hunter replaced Henderson. John Clarke joined as a second guitarist. The group signed with Chrysalis Records and released two 1986 singles, "Restless" and "Just a Minute". The group disbanded later in the year after being dropped by Chrysalis. Trotwood and Hunter formed a new band, Say You.

In 2002, Skeletal Family reformed with a line-up of Greenwood, Nowell, Taylor and Hurst. The latter had to drop out due to family commitments, replaced briefly by Phillips, and then by new vocalist Claire Bannister. They played several high-profile shows, including Wave-Gotik-Treffen three times as well as the Drop Dead Festival in New York City.

Skeletal Family's next album, Songs of Love, Hope and Despair, featuring new bassist Johnny Lorrimer, was released by Gepek in September 2009. Two months later the group announced that it had disbanded again.

In 2012, Hurst, Nowell and Greenwood reformed Skeletal Family with Owen Richards on guitar and Adrian Osadzenko on drums.

In 2018 Hurst left to form Killing Eve with Andy Cousin.

In 2019 Taylor rejoined and Hannah Small was recruited as the band's new vocalist, playing shows in the UK and Ireland. Hannah then left in 2020 to concentrate on her solo music and Anneka Latta joined the band in 2021.

With new vocalist Anneka Latta, the band wrote and recorded a brand-new studio album entitled 'Light From The Dark' which was released in April 2023.

== Members ==
Current members

- Owen Llewelyn Richards – guitar (2012 - 2018, 2026 to date )
- Ian "Karl Heinz" Taylor – keyboards/saxophone (1982–1983, 2002–2009, 2019 to date)
- Adrian Osadzenko – drums (2012 to date)
- Anneka Latta - vocals (2021 to date)

>

Former members

- Stan Greenwood – guitar (1982–1986, 2002–2009, 2012–2026)
- Hannah Small - vocals (2019–2020)
- Anne-Marie Hurst – vocals (1982–1985, 2002, 2012–2018)
- Steve Crane – drums (1982–1983)
- Howard Daniels – drums (1983)
- Martin Henderson – drums (1983–1985, 2002–2009)
- Richard "Dik" Hawkins – drums (1985)
- Kevin Hunter – drums (1985–1986)
- John Clarke – guitar (1985–1986)
- Katrina Phillips – vocals (1985–1986, 2002)
- Claire Bannister – vocals (2002–2009)
- Johnny Lorrimer – bass (2009)

== Discography ==
=== Studio albums ===
- Burning Oil (1984, Red Rhino Records) UK Indie No. 1
- Futile Combat (1985, Red Rhino) UK Indie No. 7
- Sakura (2005, Gepek Records)
- Songs of Love, Hope & Despair (2009, Gepek Records)
- Day of All Days (2011)
- Light from the Dark (2023, Chapter 22)

=== Singles and EPs ===
- Trees 7-inch EP (1983, Luggage) UK Indie No. 50
- "The Night" 7-inch single (1983, Red Rhino) UK Indie No. 41
- "She Cries Alone" 7-/12-inch single (1984, Red Rhino) UK Indie No. 8
- Recollect 12-inch EP (1984, Red Rhino) UK Indie No. 7
- "So Sure" 7-/12-inch single (1984, Red Rhino) UK Indie No. 2
- "Promised Land" 7-/12-inch single (1985, Red Rhino) UK Indie No. 2
- "Restless" 7-/12-inch single (1986, Chrysalis Records
- "Just a Minute" 7-/12-inch single (1986, Chrysalis)
- "All My Best Friends" (2004, Roach Daddy Records)
- "My Own Redemption" (2022, Gepek)
- "My Own Redemption (acoustic)" (2022, Gepeck)
- "Cry Baby" (2022)
- "Beautiful Disaster" (2023)

=== Compilation albums ===
- Together – cassette combining Burning Oil and Futile Combat (1985, Red Rhino)
- Ghosts (1986, Onsala)
- The Singles Plus 1983–85 (1994, Anagram)
- Burning Oil/Futile Combat (1995, Dojo)
- Promised Land – The Best of Skeletal Family (2001, Anagram)
- Eternal: Singles · Albums · Rarities · BBC Sessions · Live · Demos 1982–2015 (2016, Cherry Red Records)

=== Videos ===
- Live at Sheffield 1984 VH (1984, self-released)
- Promised Land – Live 1983–1984 DVD (2007, Cherry Red)
