= Lawrence Ross =

American novelist

- Born: February 20, 1966 (age 60); Los Angeles, California, U.S.
- Writing career
- Genre: fiction. non-fiction

Lawrence C. Ross Jr. (born February 20, 1966) is an author of historical texts and fiction.

== Life ==
He was born in Los Angeles, California, and attended Loyola High School and then University of California, Berkeley, and UCLA, where he earned a degree in history. Ross has a Master of Fine Arts (MFA) degree from the UCLA School of Theater, Film and Television, in screenwriting.

Ross worked as a reporter, for the Los Angeles Independent Newspaper and was appointed managing editor of Rap Sheet magazine, hip hop's first West Coast magazine in 1997.

In 1997, Ross, a member of Alpha Phi Alpha fraternity, began writing The Divine Nine: The History of African American Fraternities and Sororities (ISBN 0758202709). The Divine Nine was the first book written that covered the members of the National Pan-Hellenic Council (NPHC). The book has appeared on the bestseller lists of the Los Angeles Times, Essence and Blackboard magazine. As a result of Ross's Divine Nine, he toured the campus lecture circuit. In the past ten years, Ross has lectured at over 300 colleges and universities, on the topics of the NPHC and hazing and how black fraternity and sorority members can fulfill their promise.

He has also written commentaries for The Root.com, The Grio.com and CNN.com about African American fraternal life and education.

In 2001, Ross's second book, The Ways of Black Folks: A Year in the Life of a People, was published. In it, Ross chronicles the stories of black people from throughout the African diaspora. It was selected as a "Fall Must Read", by the National Association of Black Journalists.

Ross's third book and fiction debut, Friends With Benefits, was chosen as a main selection, by Doubleday's Black Expressions Book Club.

In October 2007, his fourth book, Skin Game, was published by Kensington Books. In September 2007, his fifth book, Money Shot: The Wild Nights and Lonely Days in Black Porn, was published by Thunder's Mouth Press. Money Shot was the first book written about the black adult industry. In February 2016, St. Martin's Press published his sixth book, Blackballed: The Black and White Politics of Race on America's Campuses.

Ross has appeared as a guest on National Public Radio and on television shows, such as Good Morning Atlanta. He has been interviewed in Ebony, Savoy, Essence and Newsweek magazines, the Los Angeles Times, Africana.com and The Times.

Ross appears as himself in the 2015 horror mockumentary Savageland, discussing a fictional book his character wrote about the events of the film.

In 2018, Ross received an honorary PhD from the University of La Verne.

== Works ==
- The Divine Nine : The History of African American Fraternities and Sororities, New York, NY: Kensington Publishing, 2000, ISBN 9780758202703, OCLC 679604238
- The Ways of Black Folks : A Year in the Life of a People, New York: Dafina; London : Turnaround, 2004. ISBN 9780758206343, OCLC 59303677
- Blackballed : The Black and White Politics of Race on America's Campuses, New York: St. Martin's Griffin. ISBN 9781250131546, OCLC 957021859

== See also ==
- List of Alpha Phi Alpha brothers
