= Donald Simpson Bell =

English footballer, school teacher & army officer (1890-1916)

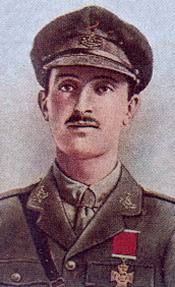
- Donald Simpson Bell as depicted on a cigarette card.
- Born: 3 December 1890; Harrogate, West Riding of Yorkshire, England
- Died: 10 July 1916 (aged 25) near Contalmaison, France
- Burial place: Gordon Dump Cemetery, France
- Military career
- Allegiance: United Kingdom
- Branch: British Army
- Service years: 1915–1916
- Rank: Second Lieutenant
- Units: Green Howards (Alexandra, Princess of Wales's Own Yorkshire Regiment)
- Conflicts: World War I: Western Front; Battle of the Somme; Battle of Albert †; First day on the Somme
- Awards: Victoria Cross
- Other work: Teacher; Footballer

Second Lieutenant Donald Simpson Bell, VC (3 December 1890 – 10 July 1916) was an English school teacher and professional footballer. During World War I he was awarded the Victoria Cross (VC) for actions during the Battle of the Somme in mid-1916, becoming the only English professional football player to be awarded the VC.

== Football ==
Bell was born on 3 December 1890 to Smith and Annie Bell, who resided in Queen's Road, Harrogate. He attended St Peter's Church of England Primary School and Harrogate Grammar School before going to Westminster College, London, to train as a teacher. A noted sportsman at college, he played as an amateur with Crystal Palace and later for Newcastle United. He returned to Harrogate and became a schoolteacher at Starbeck Council School (now Starbeck Primary School) and a member of the National Union of Teachers. To supplement his salary, in 1912 he signed professional forms with Bradford (Park Avenue). He played 6 games for the club as a defender or midfielder between 1912 and 1914.

== World War I ==
When World War I broke out, he became the first professional footballer to enlist into the British Army – joining the West Yorkshire Regiment in 1915. He was promoted to Lance Corporal and then commissioned into the 9th Battalion, Green Howards (Alexandra, Princess of Wales' Own Yorkshire Regiment), going to France in November 1915. While on leave in June 1916 he married Rhoda Margaret née Bonson before returning to the front. After being in reserve for the opening of the battle of the Somme, the 9th battalion were ordered into the front line on 5 July.

Bell was awarded the Victoria Cross for his actions on 5 July 1916 at Horseshoe Trench, Somme, France.

For most conspicuous bravery. During an attack a very heavy enfilade fire was opened on the attacking company by a hostile machine gun. 2nd Lt. Bell immediately, and on his own initiative, crept up a communication trench and then, followed by Corpl. Colwill and Pte. Batey, rushed across the open under very heavy fire and attacked the machine gun, shooting the firer with his revolver, and destroying gun and personnel with bombs. This very brave act saved many lives and ensured the success of the attack. Five days later this very gallant officer lost his life performing a very similar act of bravery.

Describing the deed in a letter to his parents, Bell stated that "I must confess that it was the biggest fluke alive and I did nothing. I only chucked one bomb, but it did the trick". Bell was shot in the head by a sniper on 10 July 1916 while attacking a machine-gun post near the village of Contalmaison. He is buried at Gordon Dump Cemetery, near Albert. His Victoria Cross was formerly displayed at the Green Howards Museum in Richmond, Yorkshire. On 25 November 2010 it was auctioned by London medal specialists, Spink. It was purchased for a reported £210,000 by the Professional Footballers' Association and is on display at the National Football Museum in Manchester.

== Legacy ==
On 9 July 2000, through the initiative of "The Friends of the Green Howards Museum", General The Lord Dannatt, then Colonel of the regiment unveiled a memorial dedicated to Bell on the spot where he lost his life at Contalmaison, now known as Bell's Redoubt. The event was covered by television and every year since then a small service has been held there. In 2010, the tenth anniversary of the unveiling was celebrated and in 2016, at Bell's Redoubt, with a much improved memorial, there was scheduled to be a remembrance service on the hundredth anniversary of Bell's heroism.. There is a memorial plaque to him in Wesley Methodist Church, Harrogate, where he was a Sunday School Teacher. There is also a memorial window to him in the chapel of Westminster College, Oxford - which was transferred from the previous college site in London, where Bell trained.

== Bibliography ==
- Whitworth, Alan (2012). Yorkshire VCs. Pen and Sword Books. ISBN 978-1-84884-778-1.
- Gliddon, Gerald (2011) [1991]. Somme 1916. VCs of the First World War. The History Press. ISBN 978-0-7524-6303-2.
