= Tronics =

- Origin: London, England
- Genres: Rock, new wave, punk, post-punk
- Years active: 1978–1984
- Labels: Tronics, Alien Records, Hyped To Death, Wrench Records, M'Lady's
- Past members: Ziro Baby; Alyse In Wonderland; Jon Mclaughlin; Charlie Francis; Archie Macphereson; Ralph E Boy; Jason Blows; Bob Thompson; Steve Heddon; Gaby Devivienne; Rick Gregerson; Glenn Evans; Richard Kenyon

The Tronics were a London-based band that released records from 1979 to 1984. The band was formed and fronted by musician, songwriter, and music producer Zarjaz Baby, also known as Ziro Baby.

== Background and influences ==
The band was known for being primitive and strange, with an underground reputation. They released a string of highly acclaimed records during the post-punk and new wave periods. Tronics has been recognised for releasing the first independent cassette album, Tronics, to be distributed both nationally and internationally. The Tronics' cassette album was soon followed by another cassette album of outsider art rock, in 1980, What's the Hubub Bub, that was later reissued on vinyl in 2013 on M'lady's Records. The last Tronics release was "Wild Cat Rock", a 7" record on Red Rhino Records in 1984.

== Style and sound ==
The Tronics' style and sound saw several changes during their activity described as a clash of punk attitude, sixties psychedelic (Jimi Hendrix), a Velvet Underground comparison, the spirit of Rock 'n' Roll, a fine line between hypnotism and somnambulism, with a medieval atmosphere. Tronics recordings are mainly known to have influences from A Clockwork Orange, Marc Bolan and T. Rex, New York Dolls Johnny Burnette, Buddy Holly and Ronettes.

From their beginnings, Tronics and Zarjaz Baby were reported to be troubled by supernatural and paranormal events, described as everyday occurrences. In 1982, the NME reported that although Tronics attracted diverse groups of people, gangs of Hells Angels followed Tronics and were seen lining the back of Tronics audiences. In 1983, Zarjaz was reported to claim that he was married to Marilyn Monroe in the afterlife and that she had influenced him to create the sleeve artwork of 1983's Tronics "Wild Cat Rock" single depicting Marilyn Monroe on a subway air vent, with a tiger's head.

== The end of Tronics and beyond ==
The Tronics series ended when Zarjaz Baby moved into other music areas, including the innovative development of classical music as pop music with The Zarjaz, La Leggenda Del Block releases, firstly on Creation Records in 1984, and then to release records with the band Freakapuss. Tronics records remained highly collectible, being extensively bootlegged into the 21st century, including on the Messthetics series and then legitimately reissued, firstly on the Wrench Records CD reissue of the 1980 cassette album What's the Hubub Bub and then the Messthetics Greatest Hits album in 2006.

In 2013, UNCUT magazine noted that it had taken the best part of 30 years for the pop world to catch up to Zarjaz.

== Discography ==
- "Suzy"/"Favorite Girls" – 7" double A-side single (1979, Tronics, T001)
- "Time Off"/"Goodbye" – 7" single (1980, Tronics, T002)
- Tronics – cassette album (1980, Tronics, T003)
- What's the Hubbub Bubb – cassette album (1981, Tronics, T004)
- Love Backed by Force – vinyl album (1981, Alien Records, BEALIEN 3)
- "Love Backed By Force" – flexi-disc, free with Chainsaw Magazine No. 12, September 1981
- "I'm a Diver" – compilation track on The Snoopies Album (1981, House of Noise, RSB1)
- "Tranzister Sister" – 6 track 12" 45 rpm single (1982, Press Records, PRESS 1)
- "Wild Cat Rock"/"Tonight" – 7" single (1983, Red Rhino Records, Red 31)
- What's the Hubub Bub – CD reissue of the 1980 cassette album (2001, Wrench Records, Wrench 17)
- Shark Fucks – compilation track on Messthetics Greatest Hits, The Sounds of UK D.I.Y. 1977–80 (2006, Hyped To Death, Messthetics 100)
- Love Backed By Force – MP3 digital download album (2012, Basilica Records)
- What's the Hubub Bub – debut vinyl album release of the 1980 cassette album (2013, M'lady's Records, MLADYS 9)
- Say! What is This? – vinyl compilation album of rare and previously unreleased Tronics recordings from between 1978 and 1984. (2013, M'lady's Records, MLADYS 10)
