= Gary Marx =

English musician (born 1959)

- Born: Mark Frederick Pearman; 1959 (age 66–67)
- Origin: Withernsea, East Riding of Yorkshire, England
- Genres: Post-punk, gothic rock
- Occupations: Musician, songwriter, record producer
- Instruments: Vocals, guitar
- Years active: 1976–present
- Labels: Merciful Release; Karbon Records; Chrysalis Records; D-Monic
- Website: http://www.garymarx.com

Gary Marx (born Mark Frederick Pearman) is a British guitarist and musician.

Marx was raised in Withernsea, East Riding of Yorkshire. He was a founding member of British rock band the Sisters of Mercy and its lead guitarist and songwriter from 1980 to 1985.

He left the band in 1985 to form Ghost Dance, which included ex-Skeletal Family vocalist Anne-Marie Hurst. They released two albums and embarked on a number of extensive tours enjoying relative success. However, record-company politics and inconsistency in personnel left the outfit reeling and they had disbanded by the end of 1989.

From 1997 to 2005, he worked as a teacher at Paul McCartney's Liverpool Institute for Performing Arts. He subsequently released material as an independent artist through his own website and set up an archive for his previous band, Ghost Dance.

In 2003, Marx released his first solo album, Pretty Black Dots.

In 2007, he released the Nineteen Ninety Five and Nowhere album, with material originally written by him in 1995 for the Sisters of Mercy, at the invitation of Andrew Eldritch.

== Discography ==
With the Sisters of Mercy

- "The Damage Done" (1980) (vocals, guitars, songwriting)
- "Body Electric" (1982) (guitars)
- "Alice" (1982) (guitars)
- "Anaconda" (1983) (guitars, songwriting)
- Alice EP (1983) (guitars, songwriting)
- "Temple of Love" (1983) (guitars, songwriting)
- Body and Soul (1984) (guitars)
- "Walk Away" (1984) (guitars, songwriting)
- "No Time to Cry" (1985) (guitars, songwriting)
- First and Last and Always (1985) (guitars, songwriting)
- Some Girls Wander by Mistake (1992) (vocals, guitars, songwriting)
- A Slight Case of Overbombing (1993) (guitars)

With Ghost Dance

- River of No Return (1986) (guitars, drum programming, songwriting)
- "Heart Full of Soul" (1986) (guitars, songwriting)
- The Grip of Love (Suite in D Minor) (1986) (guitars, songwriting)
- "A Word to the Wise" (1987) (guitars, songwriting)
- Gathering Dust (1988) (guitars, songwriting)
- Introducing Ghost Dance (1989) (guitars, songwriting)
- "Down to the Wire" (1989) (guitars, songwriting)
- Stop the World (1989) (guitars, songwriting)
- "Celebrate" (1989) (guitars, songwriting)

Solo

- "Butter Fingers" / "Like Low Life" (2002) (vocals, all instruments, songwriting)
- Pretty Black Dots (2002) (vocals, all instruments, songwriting)
- Nineteen Ninety Five and Nowhere (demo) (2002) (vocals, all instruments, songwriting)
- Nineteen Ninety Five and Nowhere (2008) (vocals, all instruments, songwriting)
