= Richmond and Northallerton =

UK Parliament constituency (since 2024)

Coordinates: 54.39°N 1.69°W

- County constituency for the House of Commons
- Boundaries since 2024
- Boundary of Richmond and Northallerton in Yorkshire and the Humber
- County: North Yorkshire
- Electorate: 72,744 (June 2023)
- Major settlements: Richmond, Northallerton, Catterick Garrison, Hawes, Leyburn

Current constituency
- Created: 2024
- Member of Parliament: Rishi Sunak (Conservative)
- Seats: One
- Created from: Richmond (Yorks)

Richmond and Northallerton is a constituency of the House of Commons in the UK Parliament. Further to the completion of the 2023 review of Westminster constituencies, it was first contested at the 2024 general election, when it was won by Rishi Sunak, who was at the time leader of the Conservative Party and Prime Minister of the United Kingdom. Sunak previously represented the predecessor seat of Richmond (Yorks) from 2015 to 2024.

The constituency is named after the North Yorkshire towns of Richmond and Northallerton.

== Constituency profile ==
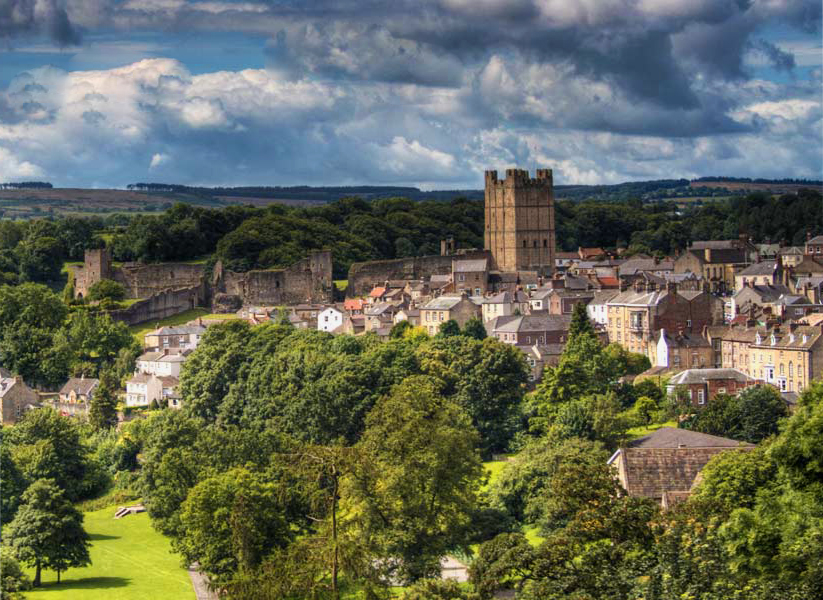
Richmond

Richmond and Northallerton is a constituency in North Yorkshire in England. It is named after its two main towns, Richmond and Northallerton. Northallerton is the larger of the two; when taken with its contiguous village of Romanby, the town has a population of around 18,000. Other settlements include the small market towns of Leyburn, Middleham, Colburn, Hawes and Stokesley and the villages of Catterick and Great Ayton.

This is a large, rural and sparsely-populated constituency that stretches between the Yorkshire Dales in the west and the North York Moors in the east. The towns of Richmond and Northallerton are historic market towns and centres for local agricultural trade. The constituency contains many small villages, hamlets and farms and is generally affluent, with the market towns being the wealthiest parts. Catterick Garrison, located just south of Richmond, is the largest British Army garrison in the world and is home to around 14,000 military personnel and associates. Most residents live in detached or semi-detached homes. House prices are generally higher than the rest of Yorkshire but lower than the UK average.

Richmond and Northallerton has a large retired population and a low proportion of younger adults. Residents have high levels of income and average rates of homeownership. The child poverty rate is below-average. Residents are more religious than the rest of the country and have average levels of education. A high proportion of residents work in the agriculture, defence and tourism sectors and the percentage claiming unemployment benefits is very low. White people made up 96% of the population at the 2021 census.

At the local council, almost all seats in the constituency are represented by Conservatives. An estimated 55% of voters in Richmond and Northallerton supported leaving the European Union in the 2016 referendum, marginally higher than the UK-wide figure of 52%.

== Boundaries ==
Under the 2023 review, the seat was defined as being composed of the following as they existed on 1 December 2020:

- The District of Hambleton wards of: Appleton Wiske & Smeatons; Great Ayton; Hutton Rudby; Morton-on-Swale; Northallerton North & Brompton; Northallerton South; Osmotherley & Swainby; Romanby; Stokesley.
- The District of Richmondshire.

However, before the new boundaries came into effect, the second tier authorities in the county of North Yorkshire were abolished and absorbed into the new unitary authority of North Yorkshire with effect from 1 April 2023. Consequently, the constituency now comprises the following from the 2024 general election:

- The District of North Yorkshire electoral districts of: Catterick Village & Brompton-on-Swale; Great Ayton; Hipswell & Colburn; Leyburn & Middleham; Morton-on-Swale & Appleton Wiske; North Richmondshire; Northallerton North & Brompton; Northallerton South; Richmond; Romanby; Scotton & Lower Wensleydale; Stokesley; Upper Dales.

It comprises the bulk of the abolished Richmond (Yorks) constituency, excluding Bedale and Tanfield, which were transferred to Thirsk and Malton.

== Members of Parliament ==
For elections prior to 2024, see Richmond (Yorks).

Election	Member	Party
2024	Rishi Sunak	Conservative

== Elections ==
=== Elections in the 2020s ===
General election 2024: Richmond and Northallerton
Party	Candidate	Votes	%	±%
Conservative	Rishi Sunak	23,059	47.5	−15.8
Labour	Tom Wilson	10,874	22.4	+6.0
Reform	Lee Taylor	7,142	14.7	N/A
Liberal Democrats	Daniel Callaghan	4,322	8.9	−3.6
Green	Kevin Foster	2,058	4.2	+0.4
Binface	Count Binface	308	0.6	N/A
Independent	Brian Richmond	222	0.5	N/A
Independent	Niko Omilana	160	0.3	N/A
Yorkshire	Rio Goldhammer	132	0.3	−1.8
Monster Raving Loony	Sir Archibald Stanton	99	0.2	N/A
Workers Party	Louise Dickens	90	0.2	N/A
Independent	Angie Campion	33	0.1	N/A
Independent	Jason Barnett	27	0.1	N/A
Majority		12,185	25.1	−22.1
Turnout		48,526	65.7	−5.6
Registered electors		73,886		
Conservative hold		Swing	−10.9	

2019 notional result
Party	Vote	%
Conservative	32,861	63.3
Labour	8,530	16.4
Liberal Democrats	6,475	12.5
Others	2,038	4.0
Green	1,976	3.8
Turnout	51,880	71.3
Electorate	72,744	

== See also ==
- Parliamentary constituencies in North Yorkshire
- List of parliamentary constituencies in the Yorkshire and the Humber (region)

Parliament of the United Kingdom
Preceded by Richmond (Yorks)	Constituency represented by the prime minister 4–5 July 2024	Succeeded by Holborn and St Pancras
Preceded by Holborn and St Pancras	Constituency represented by the leader of the opposition 5 July – 2 November 2024	Succeeded by North West Essex
