= Phil Swainston =

English rugby union player

- Born: Philip Swainston; 12 December 1989 (age 36) Harrogate, England
- Height: 1.85 m (6 ft 1 in)
- Weight: 117 kg (18 st 6 lb)
- School: Harrogate Grammar School

Rugby union career
- Position: Tighthead Prop
Amateur team(s)
Years	Team	Apps	(Points)
- Harrogate
–	Rotherham Titans		
–	Otley		
Senior career
Years	Team	Apps	(Points)
2009–2012	Yorkshire Carnegie	50	(0)
2012–2017	Wasps	60	(5)
2017–2020	Harlequins	27	(0)
2020–	Rouen		
- Correct as of 30 June 2016

Philip Swainston (born 12 December 1989) is an English professional rugby union player for Harlequins.

Swainston has represented England at under-16 and at under-18 level. He made his debut for Leeds against Birmingham & Solihull. His former clubs are Otley R.U.F.C., the Rotherham Titans and Harrogate RUFC, where he attended Harrogate Grammar School. Swainston grew up in Harrogate and was at Harrogate Grammar School from 2001 to 2008 where he played both Rugby and Soccer for the school. He was part of the Senior 1st XV that victoriously won the Yorkshire Cup competition in 2007. Swainston goes by various nicknames namely Panda due to his likeness with "PO" from Kung Fu Panda, Pumpkin due to his large head and The Train as he looks identical to a locomotive. On 22 February 2017, Swainston signs for Premiership rivals Harlequins prior to the 2017–18 season.

He joined Pro D2 side Rouen ahead of the 2020–21 season.
