= Nineteen Ninety Five and Nowhere =

Studio album by Gary Marx
- Released: January 2008
- Genre: Post punk revival Gothic rock Alternative rock
- Length: 36:11
- Label: D-Monic
- Producer: Gary Marx, Choque Hosein and Frank A.

Gary Marx chronology
Pretty Black Dots (2002)	Nineteen Ninety Five and Nowhere (2008)

Nineteen Ninety Five and Nowhere is the second solo studio album by the British guitarist Gary Marx.

== Track listing ==
All tracks are written by Gary Marx.

No.	Title	Length
1.	"Blindfold"	3:39
2.	"Default"	3:13
3.	"Idiot Nation"	3:32
4.	"1995"	3:47
5.	"Open Season"	3:34
6.	"Dumb"	4:16
7.	"Black Eyed Faith"	3:54
8.	"Zapruder"	3:05
9.	"Sound and Sound"	3:44
10.	"Blood Moon"	3:23
Total length:		36:11

== Personnel ==
- Gary Marx - Vocals, all instruments & drum programming
