= Mick Reed =

British musical artist

- Born: Dewsbury, West Yorkshire, England
- Genres: Punk rock, post-punk, progressive rock, experimental
- Occupation: Musician
- Instrument: drums
- Years active: 1978–present
- Website: 1919official.co.uk%201919

Mick Reed is an English musician from Dewsbury, West Yorkshire, best known as the drummer for UK post-punk act 1919.

== Psykik Volts/Pop-Tones (1978–81) ==
Reed recorded his first single aged 18, Psykik Volts' "Totally Useless" / "Horror Stories #5", which received heavy airplay from John Peel. The single featured on a 2006 list of "Rarest Punk Singles" in Record Collector, and has been re-issued several times since its original release.

Alongside vocalist/guitarist Victor Vendetta aka Slick Vinex, Reed was signed to Rockburgh Records in 1980/81. The pair released a single "Wooden Heart" / "(Rise of the) Appliances", comprising re-recorded versions of Volts songs. The record was released under the name Pop-Tones (after the Public Image song).

== 1919/The Hive (1981–1985) ==
Reed joined 1919 shortly after their inception, and quickly formed a songwriting partnership with guitarist Mark Tighe. Although the band were only active for three years, they released the Machine LP along with the singles "Repulsion" / "Tear Down These Walls", "Caged" / "After the Fall", "Cry Wolf" / "Dream", and the unauthorised EP Earth Song. 1919 also recorded two Peel Sessions and featured on a number of compilations during this time, but in 1984 Reed's departure to form The Hive signalled the end of the band for three decades - his "tribal" drumming and partnership with Tighe having been fundamental to the 1919 sound. In 1985, The Hive released their only album Stream Of Consciousness, and the single "Kingdom Rise Kingdom Fall" before their departure.

== Ship of Fools (1992–1996) ==
Reed formed the neo-prog psychedelic band Ship of Fools alongside guitarist Andy Banks, former 1919 synth player Sputnik (bass), and keyboardists Damien Clarke and Les Smith. Friendly with the heads of the Dreamtime label, an offshoot of heavy metal distributors Peaceville Records, the band eventually signed with them and became the premiere psychedelic eccentrics on the label. Offering two albums in their lifetime, 1993's Close Your Eyes, Forget the World and 1994's Out There Somewhere, the band broke up in 1996. Smith (who went on to join Cradle of Filth) compiled their music and in 2002 released Let's Get This Mother Outta Here, a farewell collection that summed up their career.

== Touring and studio projects (1996–2015) ==
As well as contributing to a number of studio projects such as Nine Invisibles, and a quasi-active touring lineup of Ship of Fools (which would include eventual 1919 bassist Karl Donner), Reed focussed mainly on touring and session work during this period. Working with old friends in Anathema, Cradle of Filth, and Paradise Lost, Reed performed a number of roles from stage manager to live and studio sessions, including performing drums for much of Anathema's tour in 2007.

In 1996, Reed and Nine Invisibles provided music for the song "Chip Away", which featured the voice of Labour Party MP Tony Benn. The song was recorded for Campaign For Free Education's fundraiser CD No Compromize, which helped campaign against the introduction of tuition fees in the UK. Alongside "Chip Away" were tracks contributed from others including Suede, Chumbawamba, and New Model Army. In 1998, vocals for two tracks on Mandala's album Gurning the Midnight Oil, another project of Reed's, were provided by Howard Marks. The tracks were "Grow It Everywhere" and "Loose In The Temple".

== 1919 reformation (2015–present) ==
After guitarist Tighe had set about reforming the band with vocalist Rio Goldhammer, recording a demo for Revenge in the process, it was announced that Reed would be returning to the fold full-time, introducing Donner to complete the lineup. The reunion was confirmed on 30 August 2015, and the band wasted no time in getting started. By the end of October they had recorded 2015: "The Madness Continues" Sessions... and performed at La Nuit Fantasmagothic in Angoulême, France. In February 2016, 1919 released Death Note, their first EP in over 30 years, and announced plans for a full new album and tour.
