= Popular Soviet Songs and Youth Music =

- Original ceramic cassette box

Studio album by :zoviet*france:
- Released: 1985
- Genre: Ambient, experimental, industrial
- Length: 166:03
- Label: Singing Ringing/Red Rhino, Staalplaat

Popular Soviet Songs and Youth Music is the sixth album by the British avant-garde music group :zoviet*france:, who, when it was recorded, identified themselves as :zoviet-france:. Recorded in 1984 and 1985, it was first released in 1985 by the band's label Singing Ringing in collaboration with Red Rhino in double cassette format. The packaging was elaborate and very labour-intensive to create; the cassettes sat inside a sculpted, clear-glazed ceramic box with a short length of twine with a hand-painted stick on the end sticking out of the bottom. A seabird feather gathered from the beach at Seascale (one mile from the Sellafield nuclear waste processing facility) was stuck through a hole in each side of the box, held in place with sealing wax, which held the cassettes in. The inserts included a parody of the American flag (with mini-hammer and sickles in place of the stars) silk-screened on muslin, a piece of paper with art silk-screened on it, and a professionally printed sheet of paper with the track list and various sets of instructions for use of the package in English, Spanish and French, with most of them obviously being jokes ("Remove feather by melting wax seal. Discard burnt cassettes. Retain box."). Staalplaat re-released it in triple CD format in 1994, with other editions in 1995 and 2004. These were packaged between two round felt pieces cut from black market Red Army caps, and held together with a Soviet military pin. The design on the front cover piece is by E. Van Weelden. The first edition was problematic; the intent was to sandwich the music CDs between CDs with tones on the play side and felt glued on the label side, but many copies wound up with the music CDs having the felt glued on them. The second and third editions don't have the tone CDs or the glued-on felt. In 2019, Vinyl-on-demand released Popular Soviet Songs on vinyl both as part of the 15 LP/2 x 7" box set Châsse (the first of three volumes encompassing their entire career), and as a stand-alone 3 LP + 7" set.

Another version of the song "Ram" was released, with an unadorned preacher's voice (discussing his experiences speaking with Jim Jones' attorney) taped off the radio beginning the track, which segues into the original song. This version was originally on the now out-of-print 1985 Ritual: Land's End compilation cassette on Touch, and is now available on the :zoviet*france: CD Collusion.

== Track listing ==
Below is the CD track list. The original cassettes were laid out like this:
Side 1: CD 1
Side 2: CD 2-1 to CD 2-11
Side 3: CD 2-12 to CD 3-2
Side 4: CD 3-3 to CD 3-9
Other differences in the cassette version:
Stains and Filth in the Convent AOUEI was entitled Stains and Filth in the Convent.
"Charm Aliso" was entitled "Chirm Aliso."

The Vinyl-on-demand 3 LP + 7" reissue:
LP 1: Side 1 - CD 1-1 to CD 1-6; Side 2 - CD 1-7 to CD 1-10
LP 2: Side 1 - CD 2-1 to CD 2-7; Side 2 - CD 2-8 to CD 2-12 (2-12, "Burning Bush," is unlisted in the packaging)
7": Side 1 - CD 2-13 to CD 2-15; Side 2 - CD 2-16 to CD 2-18
LP 3: Side 1 - CD 3-1 to CD 3-5; Side 2 - CD 3-6 to CD 3-9

=== CD 1 ===
1. Tier of Veils (4:55)
2. Ram (2:49)
3. Stains and Filth in the Convent AOUEI (tracks 3 to 7) - Duir (1:52)
4. Zonë (2:41)
5. Straif (La Mère Du Bois) Z Estrif (3:59)
6. White Track (Fire Frost) (4:57)
7. Veil (8:12)
8. Pesach (1:49)
9. Decoy (6:36)
10. Yezidi (5:03)

=== CD 2 ===
1. добрый день ("good day" or "good afternoon") (4:39)
2. Yezidi Circle Trap (tracks 2 to 7) - Signal (0:14)
3. Sidi (3:36)
4. Birch Brake (2:21)
5. Sein (3:46)
6. Spin (Hellisein) (3:20)
7. Tan-Tal (9:37)
8. Ma-Ja (6:20)
9. Whip (2:33)
10. Veil (1:12)
11. Fearn (5:45)
12. Burning Bush (9:03)
13. Beak and Snout (tracks 13 to CD 3 track 2) - Sidhe (Riuben) (3:36)
14. Marsh (2:44)
15. Swine (1:09)
16. Marsh (1:32)
17. Signal (Circe) (1:23)
18. Migration (6:44)

=== CD 3 ===
1. Burning Bush (4:39)
2. Sheol (9:25)
3. Veil (Sloe Semen) (6:02)
4. Signal (1:39)
5. Charm (tracks 5 to 8) - Chirm Ela (8:05)
6. Chirm Geis (7:07)
7. Charm Aliso (4:52)
8. Shewel (5:52)
9. Yezidi (Say) (5:55)
