= Zoviet France =

English band

zoviet*france:
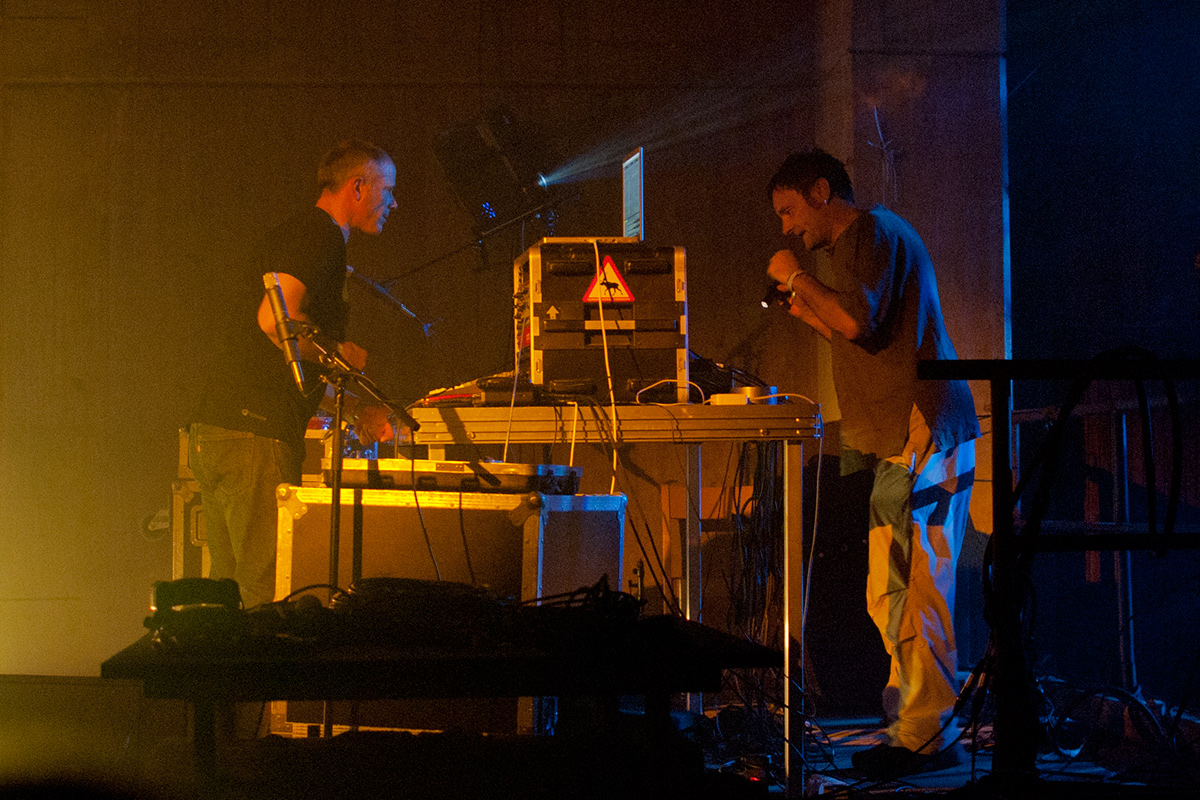
- :zoviet*france: performing in 2011. L–R: Mark Warren, Ben Ponton

Background information
- Origin: Newcastle upon Tyne, England
- Genres: Dark ambient; post-industrial; industrial; ambient
- Years active: 1980–present
- Labels: Charrm; Red Rhino; Staalplaat; DOVentertainment; Soleilmoon; Mute
- Spinoffs: Reformed Faction; Rapoon; Dead Voices on Air
- Members: Ben Ponton; Mark Warren
- Past members: Andy Eardley; Lisa Hale; Mark Spybey; Paolo Di Paolo; Peter Jensen; Robin Storey

Zoviet France (also known as :$OVIET:FRANCE:, Soviet France, :Zoviet-France:, and latterly usually written as :zoviet*france:) are a music group from Newcastle upon Tyne, in northeastern England. Their music combines dissonant and industrial textures to produce idiosyncratic ambient music. Formed in 1980 and remaining largely anonymous, the group has had a number of members. Presently, it consists of co-founder Ben Ponton and Mark Warren. Former members include Peter Jensen, Robin Storey (who now records as Rapoon), Lisa Hale, Paolo Di Paolo, Mark Spybey (who now records as Dead Voices on Air), and Andy Eardley.In 2005, Storey, Spybey, and Eardley formed the group Reformed Faction.

Zoviet France participated in the early 1980s underground tape scene. The packaging of their releases was often unconventional, involving materials such as hessian, tar paper, and aluminium foil.

The group provided music for the 2015 American mockumentary film Savageland.

== Discography ==
- Garista (1982)
- [untitled] (1982)
- Norsch (1983)
- Mohnomishe (1983)
- Eostre (1984)
- Popular Soviet Songs and Youth Music (1985)
- Gris (1985)
- Misfits, Loony Tunes and Squalid Criminals (1986)
- Gesture Signal Threat (1986)
- A Flock of Rotations (1987)
- Assault and Mirage (1987)
- Loh Land (1987)
- Shouting at the Ground (1988)
- Look Into Me (1990)
- Just an Illusion (1990)
- Shadow, Thief of the Sun (1991)
- Vienna 1990 (1991)
- Collusion (1992)
- What Is Not True (1993)
- Digilogue (1996)
- in.version (1996)
- Mort Aux Vaches: Feedback (1998)
- The Decriminalisation of Country Music (2000)
- utdrag (2003)
- shteirlel (2008)
- 7.10.12 (2012)
- The Tables Are Turning (2013)

== See also ==
- List of ambient music artists
