= Digilogue =

1996 studio album by :zoviet*france:

Studio album by :zoviet*france:
- Released: 1996
- Length: 67:47
- Label: Soleilmoon Recordings

Alternative cover
- CD reissue cover

Digilogue is a music album of recordings which became the twentieth commercial release by the British avant-garde music group :zoviet*france:. It was first released in 1996 in limited edition 12 inch clear vinyl format by the United States record label, Soleilmoon Recordings. Subsequently, a CD version was released in 1998 by Soleilmoon Recordings, with additional tracks. The album reach #73 on the CMJ Radio Top 200 charts in the U.S.

"Amber", from the CD version of the album, was used as the soundtrack to The Shop Floor, a video production by the artist Francis Gomila (UK, 2003).

== Track listing ==
=== Vinyl album ===
Side One
No.	Title	Length
1.	"Alchemagenta"
2.	"Angel's Pin Number"

Side Two
No.	Title	Length
1.	"Haze Polder"
2.	"Carbon"
3.	"Resin (Amber)"

=== Compact disc ===
No.	Title	Length
1.	"Alchemagenta"	14:07
2.	"Haze Polder"	10:36
3.	"Soft Helion"	5:44
4.	"Another Soft Helion"	8:09
5.	"Angel's Pin Number"	6:07
6.	"Carbon"	1:44
7.	"Amber"	6:34
8.	"Init"	14:46
Total length:		67:47
