= Love Backed by Force =

Studio album by Tronics
- Released: 1980
- Genre: Post-punk
- Label: Alien

Love Backed by Force is the sole studio album by British post-punk band Tronics, released in 1980 by record label Alien.

== Reception ==
Professional ratings
Review scores
Source	Rating
AllMusic	4/5 stars

Fact called it a "bizarre, brilliant DIY record".
