= Garista =

1982 studio album by :zoviet*france:

:Garista:

Studio album by :$OVIET:FRANCE:
- Released: 1982
- Recorded: December 1981
- Length: 39:49
- Labels: $OVIET:FRANCE: (1982); Singing Ringing (1985); Charrm (1990)
- Producers: Ben Ponton, Peter Jensen, Robin Storey

:$OVIET:FRANCE: chronology
:Garista: (1982)	untitled (1982)

:Garista: is a debut album by the British avant-garde music group :zoviet*france:, who, when it was recorded, identified themselves as :$OVIET:FRANCE:. Recorded in December 1981, it was the first commercial album by the group, who released it themselves in 1982 in audio cassette format. Subsequently it was re-released by the music label Singing Ringing, again in audio cassette format (UK, 1985), and then by Charrm in audio cassette, 12-inch vinyl and CD formats (UK, 1990).

== Track listing ==
Side one

1. "Scrama Mdags" – 2:28
2. "Mosbas" – 3:37
3. "Mama Piss" – 3:21
4. "Nrunknesh" – 2:52
5. "Caarcuraz" – 5:39

Side two

6. "M1 M1 M1" – 7:24
7. "Rangmabasm" – 14:23

== Production details ==
1982 edition
LABEL: :$OVIET:FRANCE: (UK)
CATALOGUE NUMBER: no catalogue number
FORMAT: normal bias audio cassette with hand made inlay (manually screenprinted muslin glued to card backing stained with creosote) and manually screenprinted labels.
ARTWORK: original artwork and design by :$OVIET:FRANCE:
TOTAL RUNNING TIME: 00:39:49

1985 edition
LABEL: Singing Ringing (UK)
CATALOGUE NUMBER: no catalogue number
FORMAT: normal bias audio cassette with hand made inlay (manually screenprinted muslin glued to card backing stained with creosote) and manually screenprinted labels.
ARTWORK: original artwork and design by :$OVIET:FRANCE:
TOTAL RUNNING TIME: 00:39:49

1990 edition
LABEL: Charrm (UK)
CATALOGUE NUMBERS: CHARRMTC1 (audio cassette); CHARRMLP1 (12 inch vinyl); CHARRMCD1 (CD)
FORMATS: normal bias audio cassette with hand made inlay (manually screenprinted muslin glued to card), commercially printed insert and commercially printed labels; 12 inch vinyl record with commercially printed sleeve; audio CD with commercially printed inlay and traycard.
ARTWORK: original artwork and design by :$OVIET:FRANCE:
TOTAL RUNNING TIME: 00:39:49
