= Untitled album by Zoviet France =

1982 studio album by :zoviet*france:

Untitled

Studio album by Zoviet France
- Released: 1982
- Recorded: 1981, December
- Length: 25:17 (1982, 1985); 32:30 (1990)
- Label: Red Rhino Records (1982, 1985); Charrm (1990)

Zoviet France chronology
Garista (1982)	Untitled (1982)	Norsch (1983)

The untitled album by Zoviet France, also known as hessian, the hessian album, the burlap album or OK Boys, is the second commercial music album release by the British avant-garde music group Zoviet France. Recorded in December 1981, it was the first released in 1982 in 12-inch vinyl album format by the British record label Red Rhino Records. A re-edited version was released in 1985 by Red Rhino Records, and then re-released by the British label Charrm in 12-inch vinyl album and CD formats (UK, 1990). The vinyl album versions are significant for being packaged in custom made screenprinted hessian (burlap) bags. The CD version is different from the vinyl versions in featuring an extended version of the last track, "Ji Boys".

== Production details ==
=== 1982 edition ===
- Label: Red Rhino Records (UK)
- Catalogue number: RED12
- Format: 12 inch vinyl album with hand made sleeve (manually screenprinted hessian bags)
- Artwork: original artwork and design by :$OVIET:FRANCE:
- Total running time: 00:25:17

=== 1985 edition ===
- Label: Red Rhino Records (UK)
- Catalogue number: RED12
- Format: 12 inch vinyl album with hand made sleeve (manually screenprinted hessian bags)
- Artwork: original artwork and design by :$OVIET:FRANCE:
- Total running time: 00:25:17

=== 1990 edition ===
- Label: Charrm (UK)
- Catalogue numbers: CHARRMLP2 (12 inch vinyl); CHARRMCD2 (CD)
- CD EAN: 5016266900225
- Formats: 12 inch vinyl album with commercially manufactured sleeve (screenprinted hessian bags); audio CD with commercially printed inlay and traycard
- Artwork: original artwork and design by :$OVIET:FRANCE:
- Total running time: 00:32:30

== Track listing ==
Side one of 12-inch vinyl formats

1. "Ritual"
2. "Mudbast Boys"
3. "Sem Boys"
4. "Bring Hessa"

Side two of 12-inch vinyl formats

1. "Mounw"
2. "Ji Boys"
