= Simon "Ding" Archer =

- Born: Simon Alexander Archer; 26 March 1966 (age 60)
- Origin: Manchester
- Genres: Punk rock, post-punk, alternative rock, indie rock, gothic rock
- Instrument: Bass
- Years active: 1985–present
- Label: Various
- Member of: 1919, Red Lorry Yellow Lorry, aaak
- Formerly of: The Fall, The Pixies
- Website: http://www.6dbstudio.com/

Simon "Ding" Archer (born 26 March 1966) is an English musician and producer from Manchester. He is a current member of the bands 1919, Red Lorry Yellow Lorry, and Imperial Wax, and a past member of The Fall and PJ Harvey. He is owner-operator of 6DB Studios in Salford, England.

== History ==
=== The Fall ===
Archer joined seminal Manchester post-punk group The Fall in March 2003 as a bass guitarist, replacing Jim Watts. He left in April 2004 and was replaced by Steve Trafford. Archer had been occasionally involved in some capacity before he joined, and continued to do so for the remainder of their active years as musical contributor, backing vocalist or recording engineer.

- The Real New Fall LP (2003) – one track only
- "(We Wish You) A Protein Christmas" (2003)
- "Theme from Sparta F.C. #2" (2004)
- Fall Heads Roll (2005) – three tracks only
- The Remainderer (2013)

=== PJ Harvey ===
Archer was a touring member of PJ Harvey's band in 2004. The 'Uh Huh Her' tour, featuring Archer, became the 2006 live documentary Please Leave Quietly.

=== The Pixies ===
Archer replaced Kim Deal on bass for The Pixies' 2014 album Indie Cindy.

== Other work ==
Archer played Sex Pistols bassist Glen Matlock in Michael Winterbottom's 2002 film 24 Hour Party People.
