= Savageland =

2015 American mockumentary horror film

- Film poster
- Directed by: Phil Guidry; Simon Herbert; David Whelan
- Written by: Phil Guidry; Simon Herbert; David Whelan
- Produced by: Phil Guidry; Simon Herbert; David Whelan
- Starring: Monica Davis; Edward L. Green; Patrick Pedraza; VaLynn Rain; Lawrence Ross; David Saucedo; George Lionel Savage; Jason Stewart; Len Wein
- Cinematography: Turner Jumonville
- Edited by: Matt Eagleson; Matthew P.B. Smith
- Music by: Zoviet France
- Production company: The Massive Film Company
- Release date: November 1, 2015 (Mórbido Fest)
- Running time: 82 minutes

Savageland is a 2015 American mockumentary horror film written and directed by Phil Guidry, Simon Herbert, and David Whelan, concerning the events massacre on a US-Mexico border town of Sangre de Cristo that leaves every citizen dead except for an illegal immigrant amateur photographer who is accused of committing it.

== Plot ==
On the night of June 2, 2011, the border town of Sangre de Cristo, Arizona was besieged by an undisclosed incident resulting in the grisly massacre of the town's population of 57 residents. The bodies of most residents are never found, and remains of the victims are dismembered and covered with human bite marks.

The police apprehend the lone survivor of the event: Francisco Salazar, town resident, handyman, and amateur photographer, who was caught trying to flee south to Mexico. Due to him also being a loner, drifter, and having illegally entered the country years before, he is labeled as the prime suspect of the killings. He also falls under suspicion after being accused of having an inappropriate relationship with Grace Putnam, the young daughter of religious missionary Duane, who is a friend of Salazar's; other residents acknowledge the dynamic was innocent. Salazar refuses to speak and, despite contradictory evidence pointing to it being impossible that he committed the murders—a lack of motive, the difficulty of killing so many residents in a single evening and the fact that he himself has the same bite marks as the victims—he is found guilty and sentenced to death by lethal injection within 30 minutes of deliberation. Interviews with residents, families of victims, Salazar's sister give mixed opinions on Salazar's character and guilt. Salazar himself is ambivalent about the trial, and grants only one interview with a criminal psychologist who decides Salazar story is consistent and he is suffering from PTSD. He claims that he brought his camera along on the night of June 2 to document the events but lost the footage while escaping; however, one camera roll is eventually discovered by a resident who had initially apprehended him and forwarded to an independent journalist working on the case.

Though the photographs are dismissed by his lawyer, the police, and the courts as being doctored, a professional war photographer and Border Patrol specialist examine the camera roll, determine it as genuine, and piece together what must have happened that night, which corroborates Salazar's sole interview: at his house on the outskirts of town, Salazar was visited by a young man and friend, Danny suffering from mysterious wounds and blood loss. After the young man dies while Salazar attempts to call for help, he suddenly comes back to life and violently attacks Salazar, who is forced to kill him again. Salazar exits his house and witnesses mysterious figures approaching from the hills near his home. While running to Sangre de Cristo for help, he encounters another resident, a professional hunter who shoots the approaching zombies but is unable to kill them before being overcome and devoured. Salazar photographs a number of disturbing images of violent, contorted zombies attacking, devouring, and turning residents before attempting to make his way to the church to find the Putnams. However, he discovers that the horde has already descended upon the church, and it is revealed that Duane Putnam had killed most of his family with a machete to prevent them from being eaten before he is attacked by zombies himself. Salazar, having keys to abandoned buildings in town due to his work as a handyman, runs and hides until he reaches the town's daycare center, which has been overrun by zombies. There he finds Grace Putnam, the last surviving member of the family, who is separated from him by a gated window, and he is forced to watch her be devoured while holding her hand.

Some praise Salazar's bravery for documenting the night, while others dismiss the photographs as fake or criticize him for not doing more to help the residents. Only Duane is posthumously determined to have murdered his family and is buried separately from them. Salazar is ultimately executed and buried in Arizona, with his body being reported as missing from his grave shortly thereafter. After the Border Patrol specialist warns that Salazar's evidence indicates that the horde of zombies is steadily moving north, and Sangre de Cristo was merely in the way, it is revealed that mysterious deaths and disappearances have been recorded hundreds of miles away from the town. In one recovered piece of video footage, a group of campers is attacked and turned by a group of zombies, including an undead Salazar.

== Cast ==
- Noé Montes as Francisco Salazar
- Monica Davis as Monica Ramos
- Edward L. Green as Gus Greer
- J. C. Carlos as Carlos Olivares
- Patrick Pedraza as Patrick Ventura
- VaLynn Rain as Grace Putnam
- Lawrence Ross as himself
- David Saucedo as David Castillo
- George Lionel Savage as Sheriff John Parano
- Jason Stewart as Attorney Greg Daubman
- Len Wein as Len Matheson

== Production ==
David Whelan, Simon Herbert, and Phil Guidry were colleagues at UCLA and began writing with the goal of producing an independent film outside of a film studio. In an interview with Ross Kiefer, Whelan explained, “All three of us were writers, but with the cost of entry and cost of filmmaking, maybe there is something we can do instead of going the spec script route and hoping that the studio would take something on. We said ‘Why don’t we do something?’” Whelan continued: “We started talking about thrillers that we liked and ‘Paradise Lost,’ a straight documentary that was classified as a thriller, was something that came up. And we were just sort of kicking around ideas, Phil had sort of talked about the idea of doing a found footage but with still photography instead of regular, grainy video, which we felt like had been done a little bit. And then we tied it into the local landscape and immigration angle and that's how it all started.”

Whelan, Herbert, and Guidry's guiding philosophy was that every component needed to feel real. Whelan wanted the film to be something that, if the viewer didn't realize it was fictional, they would begin Googling.

Whelan noted: “Well we can’t shoot in a courtroom, but we know a guy who can do courtroom sketches. That would feel real. Phil knew an architect, and we had him do an architectural rendering of the town. We started pulling from all these different places to put as many layers on top of each other, to keep that feeling of ‘Yeah there’s something here!’. Because if it doesn't feel real the whole thing falls apart really fast.””

Noé Montes, the actor who plays Francisco Salazar, is a photographer and artist whose work deals directly with immigration.

== Reception ==
The film received positive reviews. Writing for Bloody Disgusting, Mike Wilson praised the film, especially its social commentary, saying it pulled it off without being clumsy".
