= Reformed Faction =

English musical group

Reformed Faction is a musical group formed in 2005 by three former members of Zoviet France: Andy Eardley, Mark Spybey and Robin Storey. The band's original name was The Reformed Faction of Soviet France. They played one concert, in Vienna on 10 November 2005, and released a self-titled album on the Vienna-based Klanggalerie label. In 2006, they announced that they were to continue the project under the name Reformed Faction in order to detach themselves from the name Zoviet France. The album was re-pressed under the new name and given the new title Vota. In the same year, Andy Eardley departed the band. They subsequently toured eastern Germany and recorded a second album, The War Against, for the Soleilmoon label. The album received a four-star rating from AllMusic. They have also recorded a triple album for Soleilmoon, released in 2008. The band continues today as a duo of Spybey and Storey.

== Discography ==
As The Reformed Faction of Soviet France:

- The Reformed Faction of Soviet France (Klanggalerie gg114 CD, 2006)

As Reformed Faction:

- Vota (Klanggalerie gg114 CD, 2006) – same album as The Reformed Faction of Soviet France
- The War Against (Soleilmoon SOL 153 CD)
- I Am The Source of Light, I Am Not A Mirror (Soleilmoon SOL 165 3-CD Set 2008: 1st Edition Ltd. 100 w/3" disc)
- I Am The Source of Light, I Am Not A Mirror (Soleilmoon SOL 165 3-CD Set 2009: 2nd Edition Ltd. 300)
- Until... (Greytone grey003 CD, 2010)
