= Charrm =

British record label

Charrm was a British record label based in Newcastle upon Tyne, UK operated by the company Charrm Limited. It ceased trading in 2002. The label was created predominantly to act as a production and distribution operation for recordings by the British avant garde music group Zoviet France.

== Discography ==
(In chronological order)

Catalog No.	Artist	Title	Format
CHARRMLP03	The Hafler Trio	Three Ways of Saying Two - The Netherlands Lectures	LP
CHARRMCD01	:$OVIET:FRANCE:	Garista	CD
CHARRMLP01	:$OVIET:FRANCE:	Garista	LP
CHARRMTC01	:$OVIET:FRANCE:	Garista	cassette
CHARRMCD02	:$OVIET:FRANCE:	(untitled)	CD
CHARRMLP02	:$OVIET:FRANCE:	(untitled)	LP
CHARRMCD03	:zoviet:France:	Norsch	CD
CHARRMCD04	:zoviet:France:	Mohnomishe	CD
CHARRMCD05	:zoviet:France:	Eostre	CD
CHARRMCD08	:zoviet-France:	Misfits, Loony Tunes and Squalid Criminals	CD
CHARRMCD09	:zoviet-France:	Gesture Signal Threat	CD
CHARRMCD10	:zoviet-France:	A Flock of Rotations	CD
CHARRMCD11	:zoviet-France:	Assault and Mirage	CD
CHARRMCD12	:zoviet-France:	Shouting at the Ground	CD
CHARRMLP12	:zoviet-France:	Shouting at the Ground	2xLP
CHARRMCD14	:zoviet-France:	Look Into Me	CD
CHARRMLP14	:zoviet-France:	Look Into Me	2xLP
CHARRMCD15	:zoviet*France:	Vienna 1990	CD
CHARRMCD17	:zoviet*France:	What Is Not True	CD
CHARRMCD18	Horizon 222	The Three of Swans	CD
CHARRMCD19	Various Artists	Off the Map	CD
CHARRMCD20	Ingleton Falls	Absconded	CD
CHARRMCD21	Serafuse	Fallen Angel	CD
CHARRMCD22	Alan Moore, David J & Tim Perkins	The Birth Caul	CD joint release with Locus +
CHARRMCD24	:zoviet*France:	in.version	CD
CHARRMT26	al.x	Overstand	12" single
CHARRMCD28	Various Artists	Absolute Zero	CD
CH.060997	Jonty Semper	The one-minute silence from the funeral of Diana, Princess of Wales	7" single joint release with Locus +
KENO1	Jonty Semper	Kenotaphion	2xCD joint release with Locus +

== See also ==
- Zoviet France
