= Imperial Wax =

British rock band

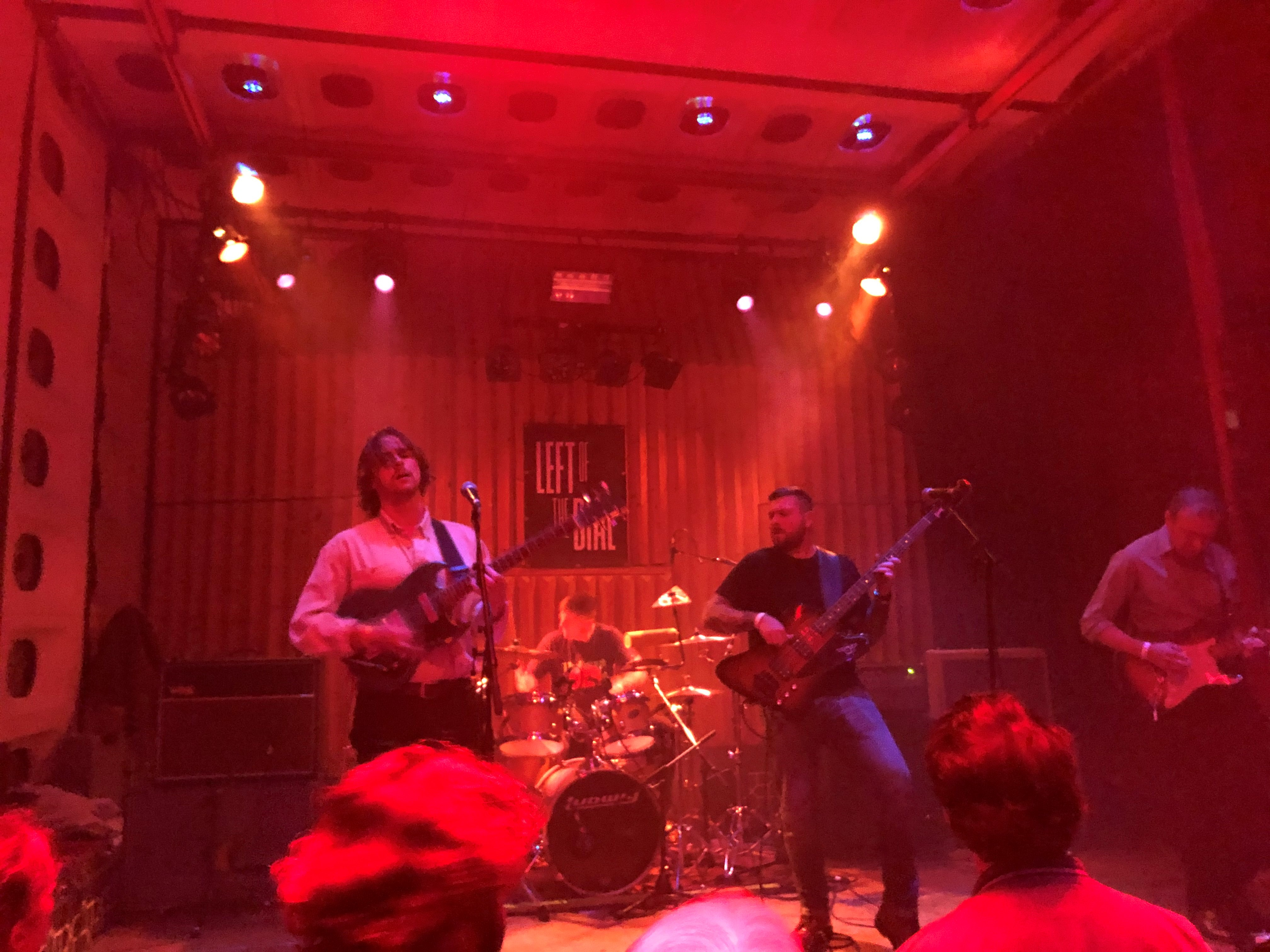
- Imperial Wax at Left of the Dial festival Rotterdam, 2019

Background information
- Origin: Manchester, England
- Genres: Noise rock, post-punk
- Label: Saustex Records
- Spinoff of: The Fall
- Members: Sam Curran; Pete Greenway; Keiron Melling; Shane Standrill; Charlie Wyatt; Simon "Ding" Archer
- Past members: Dave Spurr; Joe Martin
- Website: imperialwax.co.uk

Imperial Wax are a British alternative rock band, formed in 2018 by guitarist Pete Greenway, bassist Dave Spurr and drummer Keiron Melling, all had previously played together in the final line-up of the long-established post-punk group, The Fall. After the death of the Fall's vocalist and band-leader Mark E. Smith, the trio recruited vocalist and guitarist Sam Curran to form Imperial Wax. The band describe themselves as, "noise rock & garage brawlers unafraid of a psych workout or a rockabilly dust-up."

== History ==
=== Formation ===
Greenway, Spurr and Melling had been the instrumental core of the Fall's line-up for over a decade when Mark E. Smith died in January 2018. After Smith's death, the trio played their first live gig as the backing band to former Can vocalist Damo Suzuki in Salford in May of the same year. They were then joined by Curran, formerly of Leeds-based punk band Black Pudding, naming themselves after the first Fall album that they had worked on together, 2008's Imperial Wax Solvent. They played their first show as a four-piece at The Troubadour, London, in February 2019.

=== Gastwerk Saboteurs ===
The band's debut album, Gastwerk Saboteurs, was recorded with Andy Pearce, the former in-house producer at Real World Studios, and released in May 2019 on the Texas-based label Saustex Records. The album was released on vinyl (including a limited edition of 150 copies on pink vinyl), CD and digital, with the CD and digital versions including three extra tracks. A limited edition, lathe-cut clear vinyl 7" single of two of the tracks, "The Art of Projection"/"No Man's Land", was released around the same time.

The album received generally positive reviews from the music press. The Arts Desk described it as, "storming stuff with a sneering wit and a thump that’s aimed firmly at getting listeners on their feet", while The Big Takeover said, "the band succeeds at every approach it attempts. With a combination of solid musicianship, smart songwriting and sparkling interband chemistry, Imperial Wax easily makes the case for not only being a reasonable outgrowth of its much-beloved predecessor, but also as a great new band in its own right."

Imperial Wax quickly followed the album with more new material. A 7" single, "Bromidic Thrills"/"Bloom & Wither", was released on limited edition red vinyl by Louder Than War in October 2019.

Spurr left the band in 2019, being replaced on bass by Shane Standrill, Curran's former bandmate in Black Pudding. They were later joined by former Fall bassist Simon "Ding" Archer on synthesisers, as well as guitarist Charlie Wyatt (Chubby and the Gang, PREDECEASED and ex-Thee MVPs), standing in for Greenway while he is unable to perform due to health issues.

=== Tranquilliser ===
In September 2023, the band announced their second album, Tranquilliser, to be released on 9 February 2024. The album was released on the band's own label Guesswork Records.

== Band members ==
Current members

- Sam Curran – lead vocals (2018–present)
- Pete Greenway – guitar (2018–present, hiatus)
- Keiron Melling – drums (2018–present)
- Shane Standrill – bass guitar (2019–present)
- Charlie Wyatt – guitar (2024–present)
- Simon "Ding" Archer – synthesisers (2023–present)

Former members

- Dave Spurr – bass guitar (2018–2019)
- Joe Martin – guitar (2023)

== Discography ==
=== Albums ===
- Gastwerk Saboteurs (2019), Saustex Records
- Tranquilliser (2024), Guesswork Records

=== Singles ===
- "The Art of Projection"/"No Man's Land" (2019), Saustex Records
- "Bromidic Thrills"/"Bloom & Wither" (2019), Louder Than War
