= Talk About the Weather =

Studio album by Red Lorry Yellow Lorry
- Released: 1985
- Recorded: Spaceward Studio, Ely, Cambridgeshire. UK
- Genre: Post-punk, gothic rock
- Length: 27:13
- Label: Red Rhino
- Producer: Red Lorry Yellow Lorry

Red Lorry Yellow Lorry chronology
Talk About the Weather (1985)	Paint Your Wagon (1986)

Professional ratings
Review scores
Source	Rating
Allmusic	4/5 stars

Talk About the Weather is the first studio album by the British rock band Red Lorry Yellow Lorry. It was released in 1985 in the UK on the Red Rhino independent label. It appeared on the New Musical Express indie rock albums chart for several months and peaked at No. 3, indicating strong sales. The LP had only eight songs, although several subsequent cassette and CD releases included various bonus tracks.

== Track listing ==
All tracks are written by Chris Reed, except when noted

Side A
No.	Title	Writer(s)	Length
1.	"Talk About the Weather"		4:04
2.	"Hand on Heart"	Reed, David Wolfenden	3:49
3.	"Feel a Piece"		2:42
4.	"Hollow Eyes"		3:38

Side B
No.	Title	Writer(s)	Length
5.	"This Today"	Reed, Wolfenden	3:23
6.	"Sometimes"		3:01
7.	"Strange Dream"		3:13
8.	"Happy"		3:23
Total length:			27:13

CD Bonus Tracks
No.	Title	Length
9.	"Beating My Head"	3:24
10.	"I'm Still Waiting"	4:03
11.	"Take It All"	2:57
12.	"Happy (Single Version)"	3:40
13.	"He's Read"	2:59
14.	"See the Fire"	2:34
15.	"Monkeys on Juice"	3:14
16.	"Push"	3:03
17.	"Silence"	2:31
18.	"Hollow Eyes (12" Version)"	3:44
19.	"Russia"	3:12
Total length:		62:44

== Personnel ==
- Chris Reed - vocals, guitar
- David Wolfenden - guitar
- Paul Southern - bass guitar
- Mick Brown - drums
