= Red Rhino Records =

Record label

Red Rhino Records, also known as Red Rhino, was a British independent record label which was developed by the independent record shop and wholesaler of the same name, all formed and run by "Tony Kaye" (Tony Kostrzewa) and his wife Gerri. It was part of the Cartel, a co-operative record distribution organisation in the United Kingdom, set up by a number of small independent record labels to handle their distribution to record shops.

== History ==
Set up at the end of the 1970s, it maintained its base in York (with a shop, originally in Gillygate and later in Goodramgate) and through the early 1980s, with the growth of independently produced music, expanded its business to a point where the wholesale side became the separate entity, Red Rhino Distribution Limited. It also developed, in parallel with the main record label, a small music publishing company called Screaming Red Music and the subsidiary labels Ediesta and Red Rhino Europe (RRE), the latter notable for releases by Front 242 and Butthole Surfers. The label was closed down with the financial collapse of Red Rhino Distribution in 1988, while its subsidiary label Red Rhino Europe continued under the name RRE Records (or simply RRE) as a subsidiary of Play It Again Sam. The most notable artists featured in the main label's catalogue were The Mekons, Skeletal Family, :zoviet*France: and the first record releases by Pulp.

== Notable releases ==
Year	Artist	Release	UK Indie
1982	Zoviet France	Untitled album by :$OVIET:FRANCE:	–
1983	Pulp	It	–
1984	Skeletal Family	Burning Oil	1
1984	Hula	Murmur	14
1985	Red Lorry Yellow Lorry	Talk about the Weather	3
1985	Zoviet France	Popular Soviet Songs and Youth Music	–
1986	Red Lorry Yellow Lorry	Paint Your Wagon	3

== Discography ==
Catalog No.	Artist	Title	Format
RED 1	The Odds	Saturday Night	7 inch single
RED 2	Akrylykz	Spiderman	7 inch single
RED 3	Deadbeats	Choose You	7 inch single
RED 4	Michael Switzerland	Marilyn Monroe's Sister	7 inch single (unreleased)
RED 5	The Distributors	Lean On Me	7 inch single
RED 6	Rhythm Clicks	Short Time	7 inch single
RED 7	The Mekons	Snow	7 inch single
RED 8	Normil Hawaiians	Gala Failed	12 inch single
RED 9	The Distributors	Hold	12 inch single
RED 10	Soul On Ice	Underwater	12 inch single
RED 11	unreleased		
RED 12	Soviet France	Untitled album by :$OVIET:FRANCE:	vinyl album
RED 13	Time In Motion	Quiet Time	7 inch single
RED 14	1919	Caged	7 inch single
RED 15	Xpozez	10,000 Marching Feet	7 inch single
RED 16	Nod	Dad	7 inch single
RED 17	Steve Dixon	Talking Candy Blues '82	7 inch single
RED 18	Hula	Black Pop Workout	12 inch EP
RED 19	Time In Motion	I Wanna Be Your Telephone	7 inch single
RED 20	Red Lorry Yellow Lorry	Beating My Head	7 inch single
RED 21	Darkness & Jive	Hooked On You	7 inch single
RED 22	1919	Repulsion	7 inch single
RED 23	Soviet France	Norsch	vinyl album
RED 24	Soul On Ice	Widescreen	7 inch single
REDLP 25	1919	Machine	vinyl album
RED 26	Zoot and the Roots	I Ate the Little Red Rooster	7 inch single
RED 27	Darkness & Jive	Furnace	7 inch single
RED 28	Red Lorry Yellow Lorry	Take It All	7 inch single
REDLP 29	Pulp	It	vinyl album
RED 30	See You In Vegas	Work	7 inch single
RED 31	Tronics	Wildcat Rock	7 inch single
RED 32	Pulp	My Lighthouse	7 inch single
RED 33	Punilux	Hold Me (Never Mould Me)	7 inch single
REDLP 34	Punilux	7	vinyl album
REDLP 35	Hula	Cut from Inside	vinyl album
RED 36	Skeletal Family	The Night	7 inch single
RED 37	Pulp	Everybody's Problem	7 inch single
REDLP 38	Native Europe	Searching for an Orchestration	vinyl album
RED 39	Red Lorry Yellow Lorry	He's Read	7 inch single
REDLP 40	Soviet France	Mohnomishe	vinyl album
RED 41	Skeletal Family	She Cries Alone	7 inch single
REDT 41	Skeletal Family	She Cries Alone	12 inch single
REDT 42	Skeletal Family	Recollect	12 inch EP
RED 43	Skeletal Family	So Sure	7 inch single
REDT 43	Skeletal Family	So Sure	12 inch single
REDLP 44	Skeletal Family	Burning Oil	vinyl album
REDLP 45	Soviet France	Eostre	vinyl album
REDLP 46	Punilux	Feels Like Dancing Wartime	vinyl album
REDT 47	Hula	Fever Car	12 inch single
RED 48	Red Lorry Yellow Lorry	This Today	12 inch single
RED 49	Red Lorry Yellow Lorry	Monkeys on Juice	7 inch single
REDT 49	Red Lorry Yellow Lorry	Monkeys on Juice	12 inch single
REDLP 50	Red Lorry Yellow Lorry	Talk About The Weather	vinyl album
RED 51	La Muerte	Surrealist Mystery	12 inch single
RED 52	Red Lorry Yellow Lorry	Hollow Eyes	7 inch single
REDT 52	Red Lorry Yellow Lorry	Hollow Eyes	12 inch single
REDLP 53	Hula	Murmur	vinyl album
RED 54	Skeletal Family	Promised Land	7 inch single
REDT 54	Skeletal Family	Promised Land	12 inch single
RED 55	Red Lorry Yellow Lorry	Chance	7 inch single
REDT 55	Red Lorry Yellow Lorry	Chance	12 inch single
RED 56	Hula	Get the Habit	7 inch single
REDT 56	Hula	Get the Habit	12 inch single
REDLP 57	Skeletal Family	Futile Combat	vinyl album
REDC 58	Zoviet France	Popular Soviet Songs and Youth Music	2 x audio cassette joint release with Singing Ringing
REDC 59	Skeletal Family	Together: Futile Combat/ Burning Oil	audio cassette
RED 60	Red Lorry Yellow Lorry	Spinning Round	7 inch single
REDT 60	Red Lorry Yellow Lorry	Spinning Round	12 inch single
RED 61	unreleased		
RED 62	Hula	Walk on Stalks of Shattered Glass	7 inch single
REDT 62	Hula	Walk on Stalks of Shattered Glass	12 inch single
REDLP 63	Hula	1,000 Hours	vinyl double album
RED 64	Hula	Freeze Out	7 inch single
REDT 64	Hula	Freeze Out	12 inch single
REDC 65	Red Lorry Yellow Lorry	Paint Your Wagon	audio cassette
REDCD 65	Red Lorry Yellow Lorry	Paint Your Wagon	compact disc
REDF 65	Red Lorry Yellow Lorry	Paint Your Wagon	limited edition 7 inch single
RED 66	Red Lorry Yellow Lorry	Walking on Your Hands	7 inch single
REDT 66	Red Lorry Yellow Lorry	Walking On Your Hands	12 inch single
REDLP 67	Zoviet France	Misfits, Loony Tunes and Squalid Criminals	vinyl album
REDLP 67A	Zoviet France	Gesture Signal Threat	audio cassette
REDLP 68	Zoviet France	A Flock of Rotations	vinyl album
REDLP 68A	Zoviet France	Assault and Mirage	audio cassette
RED 69	unreleased		
RED 70	unreleased		
REDLP 71	Hula	Shadowland	vinyl album
RED 72	Hula	Black Wall Blue	7 inch single (single sided)
REDT 72	Hula	Black Wall Blue	12 inch single
RED 73	Red Lorry Yellow Lorry	Cut Down	7 inch single
REDT 73	Red Lorry Yellow Lorry	Cut Down	12 inch single
RED 74	Hula	Poison	7 inch single
REDT 74	Hula	Poison	12 inch single
REDC 75	Hula	Voice	audio cassette
REDLP 75	Hula	Voice	vinyl album
REDD 76	The Lorries	Crawling Mantra	2 x 7 inch single
REDT 76	The Lorries	Crawling Mantra	12 inch single
REDLP 77	Brendan Croker	Boat Trips In The Bay	vinyl album
REDC 78	Snakefinger's Vestal Virgins	Night Of Desirable Objects	audio cassette
RED 79	The Creepers	Brute	7 inch single
REDT 79	The Creepers	Brute (Terminally Ill Mix)	12 inch single
RED 80	Hula	Cut Me Loose	7 inch single
REDT 80	Hula	Cut Me Loose	12 inch single
RED 81	Brendan Croker And The 5 O'Clock Shadows	Darlin'	7 inch single
REDLP 82	The Creepers	Rock 'n' Roll Liquorice Flavour	vinyl album
REDC 83	Hula	Threshold	audio cassette
REDCD 83	Hula	Threshold	compact disc
REDLP 83	Hula	Threshold	vinyl album
REDCD 84	The Gun Club	Mother Juno	compact disc
REDLP 84	The Gun Club	Mother Juno	vinyl album
REDC 85	Hula	Cut From Inside/Murmur	audio cassette
REDCD 86	Red Lorry Yellow Lorry	Smashed Hits	compact disc
REDLP 86	Red Lorry Yellow Lorry	Smashed Hits	vinyl album
REDLP 87	The Rhythm Sisters	Road To Roundhay Pier	vinyl album
REDCD 88	Various Artists	Til Things Are Brighter...A Tribute to Johnny Cash	compact disc
REDLP 88	Various Artists	Til Things Are Brighter...A Tribute to Johnny Cash	vinyl album
RED 89	The Gun Club	Breaking Hands	7 inch single
REDT 89	The Gun Club	Breaking Hands	12 inch single
RED 90	Horseland	Love Dies Again	7 inch single
REDT 90	Horseland	Love Dies Again	12 inch single
REDCD 91	Zoviet France	Shouting at the Ground	compact disc
REDLP 91	Zoviet France	Shouting at the Ground	2 x vinyl album
RED 92	The Rhythm Sisters	American Boys	7 inch single
REDT 92	The Rhythm Sisters	American Boys	12 inch single
RED1B3 81	Red Army Choir	Schizophrenic	7 inch EP
TACKLP 1	Gary Clail's Tackhead Sound System	Tackhead Tape Time	vinyl album
TAP 1	The Distributors	Wireless	7 inch single
