= Blow (Red Lorry Yellow Lorry album) =

Studio album by Red Lorry Yellow Lorry
- Released: 1989
- Recorded: UK
- Genre: Rock; alternative rock; post-punk
- Length: 41:11
- Label: Situation Two/Beggars Banquet
- Producer: Harold Burgon and Red Lorry Yellow Lorry

Red Lorry Yellow Lorry chronology
Nothing Wrong (1988)	Blow (1989)	Blasting Off (1991)

Professional ratings
Review scores
Source	Rating
AllMusic	link
Hi-Fi News & Record Review	B:1/2
Rolling Stone	link

Blow is the fourth studio album by British rock band Red Lorry Yellow Lorry, released in 1989, and their last LP on the Beggars Banquet offshoot label, Situation Two, in the UK. In the US it was released by Beggars Banquet/RCA.

The album was a slight change in direction for the band. While it still had the band's customary swirling rush of guitars, pounding drums, loud bass and Chris Reed's deep growling vocals, the songs were a little slower, with stronger, more conventional melodies sweetened by occasional female backing vocals. Reed's lyrics were less downbeat, almost optimistic. As critics noted, overall Blow is a warmer album than the band's previous, somewhat dour offerings; the Lorries left their specious gothic rock trappings behind for good. Chicago Tribune noted: "There is a strong pop element in the songs` melodies and structures, a danceable energy in faster numbers and some crisp, ringing guitar work in slower tunes. The material, including Reed's flat, low vocals, is still moody, but there is a separation between instruments-and between instruments and vocals-that steers the proceedings well clear of anything that could be labeled wall-of-gloom." Trouser Press agreed, stating that "Blow takes the band a giant step forward in terms of melodicism and diversity of sound. Staying clear of the old monochromatic wall of noise, the production gives them plenty of punch and much more warmth..." The change may have resulted in better reviews but the sales were not impressive; Beggars Banquet dropped the band the following year.

== Track listing ==
All tracks are written by Chris Reed, Dave Wolfenden, Leon Phillips, and "Chill" Chillington, except when noted.

Side One
No.	Title	Lyrics	Length
1.	"Happy to See Me"	Reed	3:15
2.	"Temptation"	Wolfenden	3:07
3.	"Shine a Light"	Reed	3:10
4.	"Too Many Colors" (Reed, Wolfenden, Phillips)	Reed	3:38
5.	"Heaven" (Reed, Wolfenden, Phillips)	Reed	4:13

Side Two
No.	Title	Lyrics	Length
1.	"Gift That Shines" (Reed, Wolfenden, Phillips)	Wolfenden	3:56
2.	"In a World"	Wolfenden	3:50
3.	"You Are Everything"	Phillips	4:01
4.	"West Wakes Up"	Wolfenden	4:18
5.	"It Was Wrong"	Reed	3:10
6.	"Blow"	Reed	4:33
Total length:			41:11

CD Exclusive track
No.	Title	Length
12.	"Heaven (Acoustic Version)"	3:45
Total length:		44:56

== Personnel ==
Red Lorry Yellow Lorry:

- Chris Reed - vocals, guitar, keyboards
- David "Wolfie" Wolfenden - guitar
- Leon Phillips - bass guitar, keyboards
- "Chill" Chillington - drums, percussion, keyboards

with:

- Jilly Myhill - backing vocals (1–3)
- Steve Hagarth - keyboards (5)
- Dick Adland - drums (5–6)
- Tim Lewis - keyboards (8)
