= Rio Goldhammer =

British musician

- Born: Rio Sebastian Justin Goldhammer; 17 May 1990 (age 36); London, England
- Genres: Punk rock, post-punk, gothic rock, indie rock
- Occupation: Musician
- Instruments: Vocals, bass
- Years active: 2005-present
- Labels: Cleopatra Records, Westworld Recordings, Bunnysnot Records, Cry Wolf Records
- Website: http://riogoldhammer.net/

Rio Sebastian Justin Goldhammer (born 17 May 1990) is an English musician and academic from Yorkshire. He is best known for fronting the Bradford post-punk band 1919 since their reformation in 2014.

Goldhammer started on the Leeds underground scene in the mid 2000s, eventually setting up Bunnysnot Records in 2011 as a vehicle for releasing his early work. He is a member of the Leeds Goth Hall of Fame.

== Early life ==
Goldhammer grew up in a non-religious Jewish family in North Yorkshire. His grandfather was from Poland, while the family also has roots in Austria. Goldhammer attended a local Church of England primary school.

== In music ==
=== 1919 ===
In 2014, Goldhammer started working with 1919's founding guitarist Mark Tighe as he set about re-forming the group. Not wanting to waste time, the pair released a video for their demo of Revenge as a transitional line-up in which Goldhammer performed bass in addition to vocals. Whilst this video would ultimately catch the eye of Mick Reed and see Tighe's ambition for a 1919 renaissance realised, the interim period saw the pair join up with legendary Leeds producer Will Jackson on a project called Circle of the Absurd (COTA).

COTA though, was indefinitely shelved when the 1919 reunion got into full swing. The band self-released a live CD, 2015: "The Madness Continues" Sessions (subsequently released on vinyl by Old Skull in 2018), which contained classic 1919 songs alongside four new tracks which would become the Death Note EP. Amidst a busy touring schedule over the next year, 1919 signed to Westworld Recordings to release their second studio album, Bloodline, which was well received by fans and critics. This was followed up by the D.N.A EP, the inaugural physical release on the band's Cry Wolf label, after Tighe's death in 2017.

During Tighe's illness, Goldhammer re-started work on the COTA album hoping that his bandmate would be able to hear some of it finished. Thanks to the hard work of producer Jackson, who also provided programming and synths for the album, and filmmaker Carl Arnfield (who had made the Revenge, Death Note, and Bloodline videos), Goldhammer was able to release the eponymous Circle of the Absurd video just days before losing his friend to cancer. The first four completed COTA tracks were released as a limited edition cassette on Bunnysnot Records later that year, and Goldhammer's video for A Hymn to the Night, the second A-side track on D.N.A, featured performances from Tighe's daughters in a moving tribute to their late father.

In 2018, 1919 signed to Los Angeles label Cleopatra Records for their third studio album, Futurecide (Goldhammer's second with the group). In a 2021 interview with Goth Haus LA, he revealed the band would be releasing their new album, Citizens of Nowhere, later that year. In 2025 the band was inducted into the Leeds Goth Hall of Fame.

=== Solo career ===
On 21 September 2018, Goldhammer released his debut solo EP, RUSSIA*IRAN*DISCO*SUCK (the name is taken from Thomas Frank's What's The Matter With Kansas?), at Minicave festival, Münster, as part of a short solo tour where he also performed songs from Circle of the Absurd. The subsequent album, Peur Rouge, was made available to order with the release of a new video, "Breathe", on 25 October.

== Outside music ==
=== Literature ===
Goldhammer is an academic who completed his PhD at Leeds Beckett University in 2024 on a full scholarship. His thesis was titled Yorkshire Über Alles: An Ethnography of identity, class, and myth among first-wave Post-Punks. Previously, Goldhammer had completed a BA (Hons) in Cultural Studies and an MA in Political Theory at the University of Leeds, and later an LLM in International Law at the University of Bradford. He is a former lecturer at Leeds Conservatoire.

Goldhammer has covered a broad range of subjects relating to art, identity, and politics. His research has been published in Sounds and the City (Palgrave), Metal Music Studies (Intellect), Popular Music in Leeds (Intellect), while he has also written for news publications such as Newsweek,The Independent, Novara Media, and The Conversation. In 2022 he contributed to Keith Khan-Harris and Robert Stothard's book What does a Jew look like?

=== Politics ===
Goldhammer has stood for election on number of occasions, with the first forming the basis for his 2018 short documentary, Punk Rock Politics. Filmed in 2016, the movie documents the final days of Goldhammer's unsuccessful campaign to be elected to council in a provincial ward of Harrogate, North Yorkshire, where he was a candidate for the Labour Party. The film was an official selection in 2017 for the Workers Unite Film Festival in New York and the London Labour Film Festival, with the latter awarding it a Highly Commended status as the runner-up for its Short Documentary prize.

In 2020, Goldhammer ran for the Labour candidacy for Mayor of West Yorkshire. Despite making it through the first round, he was not selected for the ballot and the candidacy was ultimately won by Batley and Spen MP Tracy Brabin. His platform included rent control, migrant rights, and Yorkshire Devolution. At the 2024 general election, he stood as a candidate for the Yorkshire Party in the then Prime Minister Rishi Sunak's constituency of Richmond and Northallerton, saying he wanted to "give Yorkshire a stronger voice".

=== Other Media ===
Goldhammer featured in series 13 of BBCs Repair Shop.
