= Nothing Wrong =

Studio album by Red Lorry Yellow Lorry
- Released: 1988
- Recorded: UK
- Genre: Gothic rock
- Length: 31:43
- Label: Situation Two/Beggars Banquet
- Producer: Bill Buchanan

Red Lorry Yellow Lorry chronology
Paint Your Wagon (1986)	Nothing Wrong (1988)	Blow (1989)

Professional ratings
Review scores
Source	Rating
Allmusic	3/5 stars
College Music Journal	(Favorable)

Nothing Wrong is the third studio album by British rock band Red Lorry Yellow Lorry, released in 1988. It was their first LP on the Beggars Banquet offshoot, Situation Two, in the UK. In the US it was released by Beggars Banquet/RCA. The US version included two bonus tracks, the UK single "Open Up" (previously chosen by New Musical Express as a Single of the Week) and the B-side "The Rise". The album's title track and "Only Dreaming (Wide Awake)" were issued as singles in the UK. Nothing Wrong featured some occasional audio excerpts from Sir Laurens Van Der Post's BBC television series documentary Testament to a Bushmen (stills from which were used as the source of the album's front and back covers). The album included a version of Booker T. & the M.G.'s' "Time Is Tight".

== Track listing ==
All tracks are written by Chris Reed (lyrics) and Reed/Dave Wolfenden/Leon Phillips (music), except when noted.

Side One
No.	Title	Length
1.	"Nothing Wrong"	2:37
2.	"Hands Off Me"	2:31
3.	"Big Stick"	2:39
4.	"She Said"	2:53
5.	"Sayonara"	3:32

Side Two
No.	Title	Writer(s)	Length
6.	"World Around"		2:18
7.	"Hard-Away"		2:40
8.	"Only Dreaming"		3:04
9.	"Do You Understand?"		2:18
10.	"Never Know"		3:29
11.	"Pushing On"		2:50
12.	"Time Is Tight"	Steve Cropper, Booker T. Jones, Donald "Duck" Dunn, Al Jackson Jr.	0:52
Total length:			31:43

US version 1988
No.	Title	Writer(s)	Length
1.	"Nothing Wrong"		2:37
2.	"Open Up"		3:26
3.	"Hands Off Me"		2:31
4.	"Big Stick"		2:39
5.	"She Said"		2:53
6.	"Sayonara"		3:32
7.	"World Around"		2:18
8.	"Hard-Away"		2:40
9.	"The Rise"		2:46
10.	"Only Dreaming (Wide Awake)"		4:24
11.	"Do You Understand?"		2:18
12.	"Never Know"		3:29
13.	"Pushing On"		2:50
14.	"Time Is Tight"	Cropper, Jones, Dunn, Jackson	0:52
Total length:			39:15

== Personnel ==
- Chris Reed - vocals, guitar, keyboards
- David "Wolfie" Wolfenden - guitar
- Leon Phillips - bass guitar, keyboards
