= Blasting Off =

Studio album by Red Lorry Yellow Lorry
- Released: 1991
- Recorded: Los Angeles California
- Genre: Rock/alternative rock/post-punk
- Length: 39:29
- Label: Sparkhead
- Producer: Chris Reed

Red Lorry Yellow Lorry chronology
Blow (1989)	Blasting Off (1991)

Blasting Off is the fifth and final studio album by British rock band Red Lorry Yellow Lorry. It was released on the Sparkhead independent record label in 1991. The band at this point consisted of Chris Reed and a completely new assortment of musicians. They recorded the LP in a Los Angeles studio. Reed broke up the band soon after.

== Critical reception ==
Professional ratings
Review scores
Source	Rating
AllMusic	2.5/5 stars
The Encyclopedia of Popular Music	3/5 stars

The Rough Guide to Rock called it a "mediocre bookend for a band that once promised (and often delivered) great things."

== Track listing ==
1. This Is Energy – 4:34
2. It's on Fire – 2:50
3. Don't Think About It – 4:51
4. Train of Hope – 4:08
5. Talking Back – 5:38
6. Down on Ice – 2:49
7. In My Mind – 3:56
8. Sea of Tears – 3:34
9. I Can See Stars – 3:46
10. Driving Me – 3:19

All lyrics and music were written by Chris Reed, except for "This Is Energy", "Talking Back" and "Down on Ice", written by Reed (lyrics) and Reed/Gary Weight (music)

== Personnel ==
Red Lorry Yellow Lorry:

- Chris Reed - vocals, guitar, keyboards
- Gary Weight - bass guitar, keyboards
- Korky - beatbox and general braindamage
- George Schultz - acoustic drums, percussion

with:

- Martin Scott - extra guitar on "Train of Hope"
- Sam Bell - percussion on "Talking Back"
