= 1919 (band) =

English rock band

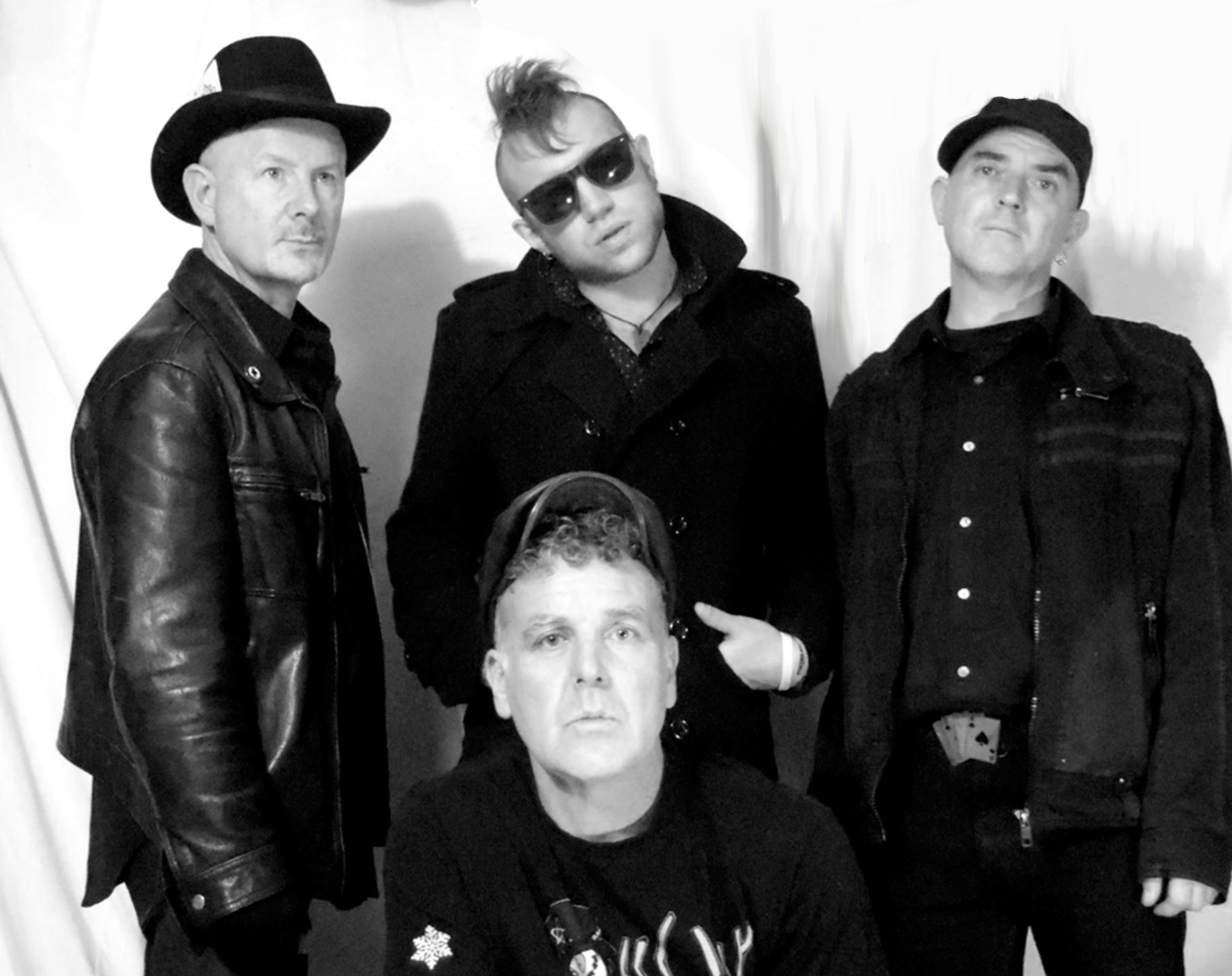
- 1919 in 2015

Background information
- Origin: Bradford, England
- Genres: Gothic rock; post-punk
- Years active: 1980–1984, 2014–present
- Labels: Cleopatra Records, Westworld Recordings, Red Rhino, Abstract, Cherry Red, Cry Wolf
- Members: Mick Reed; Rio Goldhammer; Simon "Ding" Archer; Sam Evans
- Past members: Mark Tighe; Nick Hiles; Ian Tilleard; Steve Madden; Sputnik; Kev Aston; Karl Donner
- Website: 1919.co.uk

1919 are an English rock band formed in Bradford, England in early 1980.

== History ==
=== (1980–1984) ===
The band was formed in late 1980 by Guitarist Mark Tighe and Vocalist Ian Tilleard. After starting life as Heaven Seventeen, and with early line-ups including a pre-Zodiac Mindwarp Mark Manning, the band eventually settled as 1919 (after a book belonging to Tighe) with Nick Hiles on Bass and Mick Reed on Drums. Their intention was, according to Reed, "to create a heavy melodic intense dance band with no frills and no intentions".

In 1982, 1919 released a 7" white label promo of Repulsion//Tear Down These Walls, and were subsequently invited to record their first session with John Peel in May that year. 1982 would see the single re-released on Red Rhino Records, as well as the single Caged//After The Fall and the LP Machine.

In 1983, Bassist Hiles was replaced by Steve Madden, and the band recorded their second and final Peel session on 4 May. Madden featured on the final recordings of this era, a 7" and 12" version of Cry Wolf//Storm and Cry Wolf//Dream//Storm respectively, which were released on Abstract Records along with the 12" Earth Song EP, released in 1984 after the band's dissolution.

During this period, 1919 had also included Kev Aston (Saxophone) and Sputnik (Paul Drake) (Synthesizer) at various times as part of their ensemble.

=== The Hive / Another Cinema (1984–1985) ===
By the release of Earth Song in 1984, the band had split into two splinter projects, with Reed continuing as 1919 AD before reuniting with Drake to form The Hive. The others became Another Cinema, with the line-up of Tighe, Tilleard, Madden, and Stefan Khacheturian on drums. Another Cinema were once again taken under the wing of Red Rhino founder Tony Kostrzewa, this time releasing their singles I Had a Bad Dream Last Night (1984), Hallucination Spires (1984), and Midnight Blue Oceans under the Altered States banner. The Hive released a cassette album, Stream of Consciousness, on Sicky Spread Tapes, and the 12" EP, Kingdom Rise Kingdom Fall, on Hum Music. Both bands had disbanded by 1986.

=== Comeback / The Madness Continues (2014–2016) ===
Thanks largely to the emergence of streaming sites, the early work of the band continued to generate interest among fans. In 2014, Tighe started working on new material with bass player and vocalist Rio Goldhammer. Their self-released download of Revenge, and accompanying video, by Chalkman Video, came as a surprise to most fans but was received well. Mick Mercer again rated the track highly, and the band signed almost immediately with Deadfall Management.

The band performed their first show, headlining Leipzig's Gothic Pogo Festival on Friday 22 May, and began to announce further dates across Europe. On 30 August 2015 it was announced that Reed had returned to the band as their permanent drummer and that, with the addition of Karl Donner on bass, 1919 would once again be a 4-piece, with Goldhammer remaining on vocals. Shortly afterwards, the band released a live session on CD, titled 2015: "The Madness Continues" Sessions, containing songs from their early years alongside four new tracks, which would become the self-released Death Note EP.

=== Bloodline LP and death of Tighe (2016–2017) ===
In July 2016, 1919 released a promo video for Bloodline, which was to be the title track for their second studio album. The band had signed a deal with Westworld Recordings to release the album but, with a release date not yet set, ventured once again into Europe to promote the single. After the first leg of the tour, the band were forced to cancel most of the remaining shows as Tighe had been diagnosed with cancer on his return home. The band played a final show at Brighton Racecourse's Undercover Festival, with Mark's dramatic weight loss making it impossible to travel for extended periods. This would prove to be his final performance.

On 28 January 2017, 1919 announced the tragic news of the passing of their iconic guitarist, aged 56, after his short battle with the cancer. The coming days saw tributes pour in from around the world as the news broke throughout the music press, led by John Robb at Louder Than War, and the band published an obituary in four languages on their homepage. With Tighe insistent the band continue indefinitely in his absence, an album-release show was still scheduled for the following week in Leeds. At the last minute, and after careful deliberation despite the insistence from Tighe in his final days, the remaining band decided to press ahead with a memorial performance, with money collected for Marie Curie in Tighe's honour.

Bloodline was released on 3 March and was received well by critics, with Vive le Rock's Pete Woods writing "Good goths come to those that wait" in an 8/10 review. In April the band confirmed that Sam Evans would be their new full-time guitarist, and began touring the new album once again to good reviews. As of October, the band played the last of 19 dates across Europe in Leeds.

=== Futurecide LP (2018–2019) ===
In 2018, 1919 signed to Los Angeles label Cleopatra Records to release their third studio album, Futurecide. The album featured Tighe’s last performance on "Stop the World", as well as that of late former bass player Steve Madden (who performed on "Isolation"). The first single, "Anxiety", was released on 7 December when it debuted on Post-Punk.com. The album was released on 12 April 2019, shortly after Madden himself passed away.

1919 were booked to embark on their first tour of the US that summer, but were unable to secure visas following the 2018–2019 United States federal government shutdown. However, the band went ahead with shows in Mexico and Costa Rica before heading back to Europe. Addressing the political climate of the UK and USA directly, a new video for "Isolation" was released alongside the album.

In July 2019, the band hosted Swedish post-punks Then Comes Silence for their first UK tour before making their debut at Blackpool’s Rebellion Festival.

=== Citizens of Nowhere LP (2020–present) ===
Following the death of crew member Kev Holroyd in December 2019, the band performed a memorial concert in his home town of Dewsbury on 20 February 2020. This would prove to be the band's final performance before the COVID-19 pandemic put an end to live performances worldwide. Planned tours in Europe and the UK with Then Comes Silence, as well as a one-off show with Killing Joke in Bristol, were subsequently cancelled or indefinitely postponed. This would also be the final show for departing bass player Karl Donner, who had been with the group since their reformation. On 31 August, the band announced he would be replaced by ex-The Fall, PJ Harvey, and Red Lorry Yellow Lorry bassist and producer Simon "Ding" Archer.

Other activity in 2020 included the band's inclusion in Vive Le Rock's "Goth Annual One", and vocalist Goldhammer's unsuccessful bid to become Mayor of West Yorkshire. His platform included rent control, migrant rights, and Yorkshire Devolution.

On 29 January 2021, an interview with Goth Haus LA revealed the title of their latest album, due for release that year, to be Citizens of Nowhere. Released on Paris label Manic Depression, the album saw the band labelled “head and shoulders above other denizens of the shadowy genre” in Vive Le Rock. In 2023, the band made their US debut in Los Angeles following their appearance at Leipzig’s Wave Gotik Treffen.

== Discography ==
Year	Title	Formats	Notes	Charts
1982	"Repulsion / Tear Down These Walls"	7"	White Label / Red Rhino	
1982	"Caged / After the Fall"	7"	Red Rhino	#30 UK Indie Singles
1983	"Cry Wolf"	7", 12"	Abstract	#189 UK Singles #14 UK Indie Singles
1983	Machine	LP	Red Rhino	#7 UK Indie Albums
1984	"Earthsong"	12"	Abstract	#17 UK Indie Singles
2016	"Death Note"	Download / CDr / streaming single		
2017	Bloodline	Download / CD / vinyl album	Westworld	
2017	"D.N.A"	Cassette	Original tracks included on Bloodline vinyl	
2018	"Anxiety"	Download / streaming single	Cleopatra Records	
2019	Futurecide	Download / CD / vinyl album	Cleopatra Records	
2021	"Singing to the Universe"	Download / streaming single	Manic Depression	
2021	Citizens of Nowhere	Download / CD / vinyl album / Cassette	Manic Depression	

=== Compilations ===
- State of Affairs – Various (1984)
- British Airwaves – Various (1988)
- Gothic Rock 3: Black on Black – Various (1998)
- Gothic Rock: The Ultimate Collection – Various (2001)
- The Complete Collection – 1919 (2001)
- Dark Awakening Vol. 2 – Various (2002)
- The Goth Anthology: Underground Anthems from Rock's Dark Side – Various (2006)
- A Kiss in the Reptile House – (Russia), Various (2006)
- Post Punk: Original Anthems From the 70's and 80's Post-Punk Scene – Various (2009)
- Black Planet presented with The Cure & The Story of the Alternative 80s – Various (2012)
- Silhouettes & Statues: A Gothic Revolution – Various (2017)
- Rock Off Fibro - Various (2018)
