= Anne-Marie Hurst =

English singer

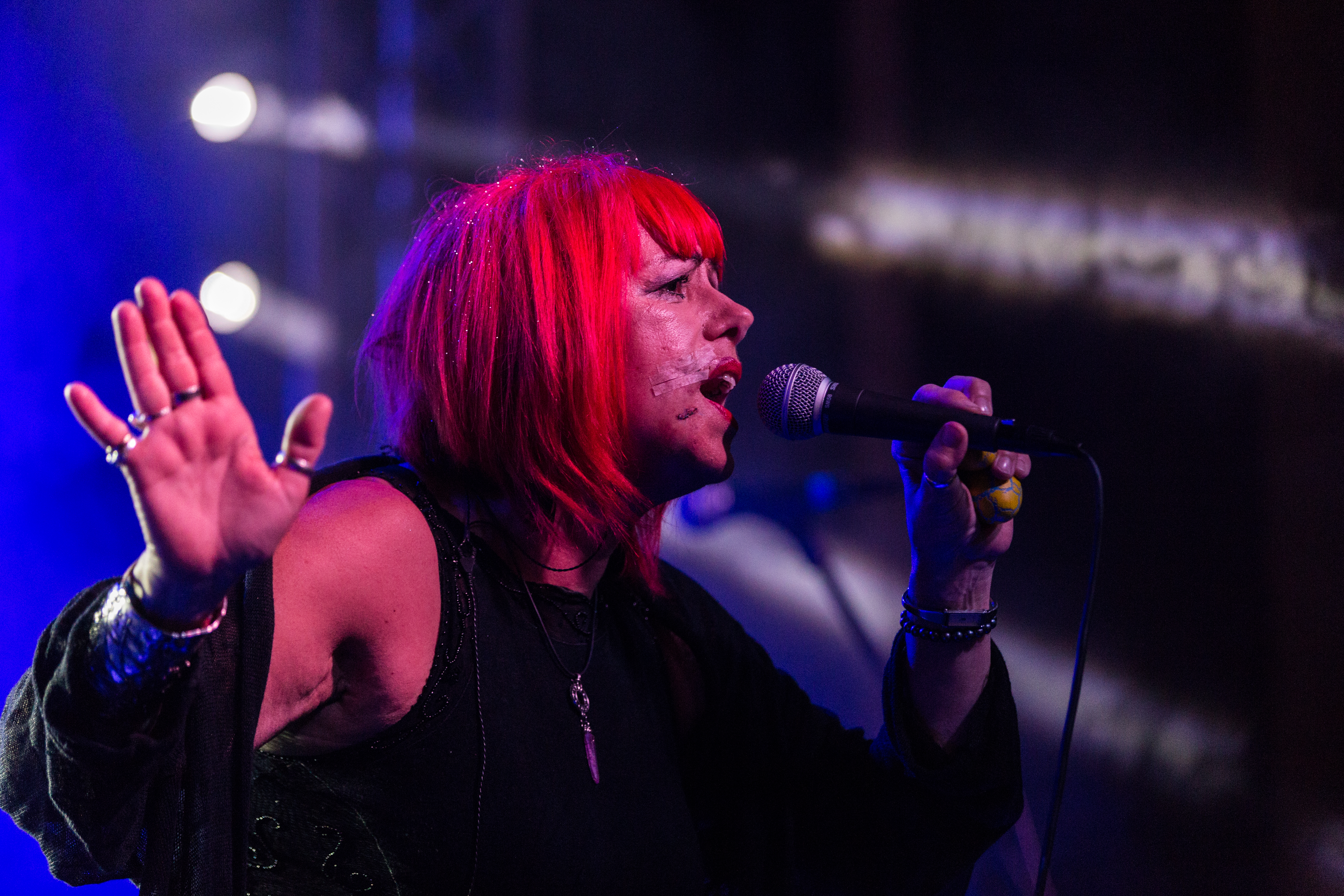
- Hurst in 2017

Background information
- Born: Keighley, West Yorkshire, England
- Genres: Gothic rock
- Years active: 1981–present
- Formerly of: The Elements; Ghost Dance; Skeletal Family

Anne-Marie Hurst is an English singer. She is best known for her work with several gothic rock groups, including Skeletal Family and Ghost Dance. She released her first solo album, Day of All Days, in 2011 on Jungle Records.
