= Paint Your Wagon (album) =

Studio album by Red Lorry Yellow Lorry
- Released: 1986
- Recorded: Leeds, UK
- Genre: New wave, gothic rock
- Length: 27:39
- Label: Red Rhino
- Producer: Red Lorry Yellow Lorry

Red Lorry Yellow Lorry chronology
| Talk About the Weather (1985) | Paint Your Wagon (1986) | Nothing Wrong (1987) |

Professional ratings
Review scores
| Source | Rating |
|---|---|
| Allmusic | 3/5 stars |
| College Music Journal | (Favorable) |

Paint Your Wagon is the second studio album by British rock band Red Lorry Yellow Lorry, and was released in 1986 in the UK on the independent label Red Rhino. It was the band's final original LP release on the label (outside of a singles collection, Smashed Hits, the following year) before signing to major label Situation Two in 1987. Like their first album Talk About the Weather, Paint Your Wagon had a very short running time at under 30 minutes. Two of the tracks, "Mescal Dance" and "Blitz", were instrumentals. Initial copies came with a limited edition seven-inch single with the tracks "Paint Your Wagon" and "More Jipp". Cassette and CD releases/reissues have featured various additional bonus tracks.

== Track listing ==
All tracks are written by Chris Reed and David Wolfenden, except when noted

Side 1
| No. | Title | Writer(s) | Length |
|---|---|---|---|
| 1. | "Walking On Your Hands" | | 2:40 |
| 2. | "Jipp" | | 3:00 |
| 3. | "Last Train" | | 2:21 |
| 4. | "Head All Fire" | Reed | 2:40 |
| 5. | "Mescal Dance" | | 2:42 |

Side 2
| No. | Title | Writer(s) | Length |
|---|---|---|---|
| 6. | "Shout At The Sky" | | 3:04 |
| 7. | "Which Side" | | 2:07 |
| 8. | "Tear Me Up" | Reed | 2:31 |
| 9. | "Save My Soul" | Reed | 2:44 |
| 10. | "Blitz" | | 3:50 |
| Total length: | | | 27:39 |

1986 Cassette/1987 CD Versions
| No. | Title | Length |
|---|---|---|
| 1. | "Walking On Your Hands" | 2:44 |
| 2. | "Jipp" | 3:00 |
| 3. | "Last Train" | 2:23 |
| 4. | "Head All Fire" | 2:41 |
| 5. | "Mescal Dance" | 2:43 |
| 6. | "Paint Your Wagon" | 2:40 |
| 7. | "Shout At The Sky" | 3:09 |
| 8. | "Which Side" | 2:11 |
| 9. | "Tear Me Up" | 2:31 |
| 10. | "Save My Soul" | 2:48 |
| 11. | "Blitz" | 3:45 |
| 12. | "Hold Yourself Down" (Only on CD) | 2:42 |
| 13. | "Generation" (Only on CD) | 3:19 |
| 14. | "Spinning Round" | 2:53 |
| 15. | "Chance" | 5:19 |
| Total length: | | 44:48 |

2017 CD Boxset Bonus Tracks
| No. | Title | Length |
|---|---|---|
| 11. | "Paint Your Wagon" | 2:36 |
| 12. | "More Jipp" | 2:55 |
| 13. | "Chance" | 5:17 |
| 14. | "Generation" | 3:07 |
| 15. | "Spinning Round" | 2:48 |
| 16. | "Hold Yourself Down" | 2:23 |
| 17. | "Cut Down" | 3:48 |
| 18. | "Running Fever" | 2:23 |
| 19. | "Pushed Me" | 2:15 |
| 20. | "Crawling Mantra" | 2:40 |
| 21. | "Hang Man" | 3:15 |
| 22. | "All the Same" | 2:55 |
| Total length: | | 63:22 |

== Personnel ==
- Chris Reed - vocals, guitar
- David Wolfenden - guitar
- Leon Phillips - bass guitar
- Chris Oldroyd - drums
