= Red Lorry Yellow Lorry =

English rock band

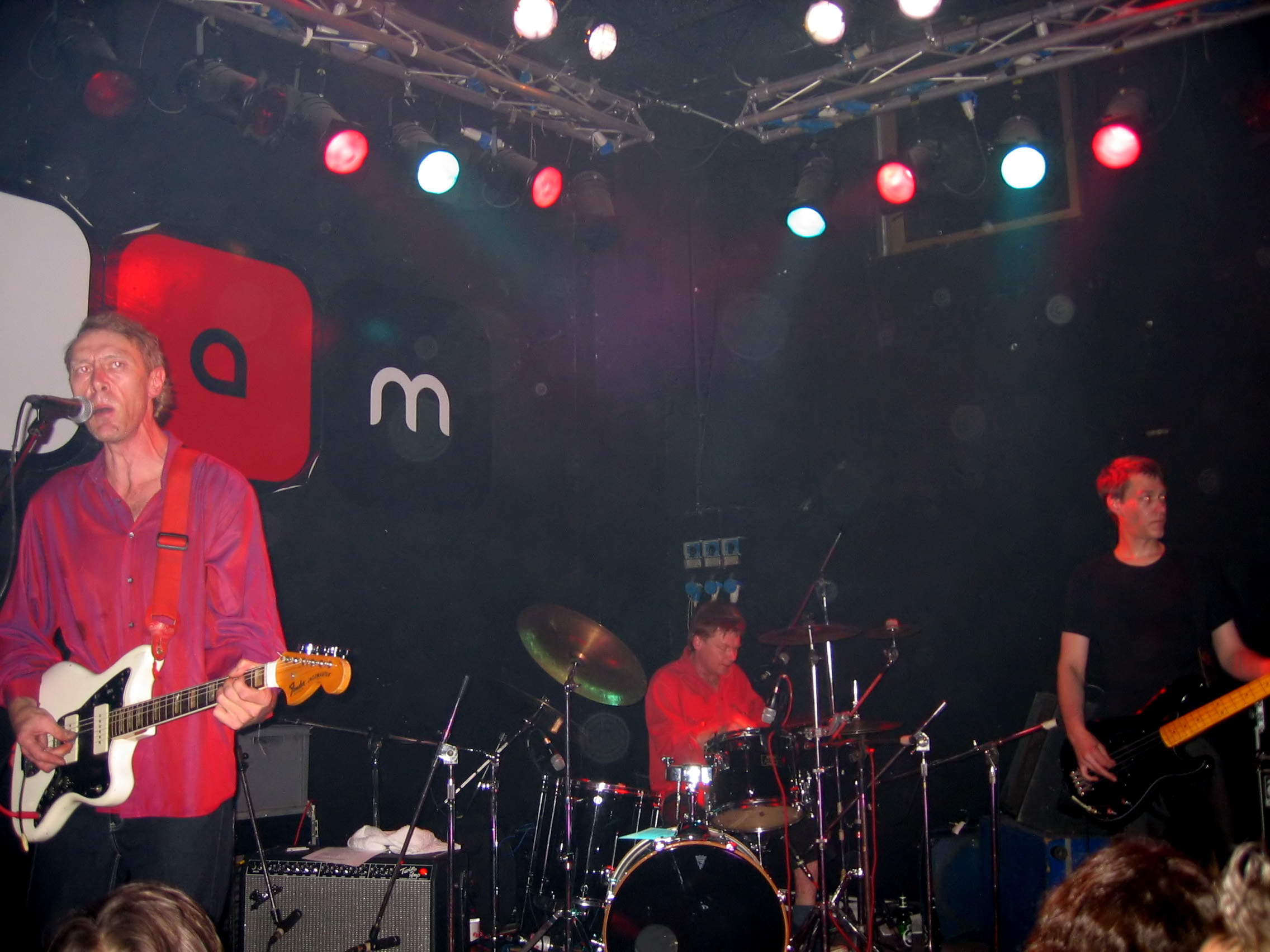
- Performing live in 2004

Background information
- Origin: Leeds, England
- Genres: Gothic rock, post-punk
- Years active: 1981–1991, 2003–present
- Labels: Red Rhino; Situation Two; Sparkhead; COP International
- Members: Chris Reed; Dave Wolfenden; Ding Archer; Martin Henderson
- Past members: Mark Sweeney; Mark Chillington; Martin Fagan; Paul Southern; Steve Smith; Mick Brown; Chris Oldroyd; Gary Weight; George Schultz; Martin Scott; Leon Phillips; Mark Hubbard; Marcus Ellis; Dick Adland
- Website: www.red-lorry-yellow-lorry.com

Red Lorry Yellow Lorry, also known very briefly as the Lorries, are an English rock band formed in Leeds in early 1981 by guitarist and songwriter Chris Reed, vocalist Mark Sweeney, bassist Steve Smith and drummer Mick Brown. After breaking up in 1991, the band reformed in 2003 and have released 6 studio albums over the course of their career.

== History ==
The band was formed by guitarist/songwriter Chris Reed and vocalist Mark Sweeney, along with bassist Steve Smith and drummer Mick Brown (who would later join The Mission). Sweeney left the band in late 1981 and Reed permanently took over as vocalist, with Martin Fagan joining as a second guitarist. The group's sound, featuring a numbing guitar drone, powerfully throbbing bass, pounding drum machine, and Reed's cavernous vocal tones, caused the Lorries (as their fans came to call them) to be quickly lumped into the then-developing gothic rock scene by pop journalists, although the band themselves denied they were ever associated with goth and preferred to cite Wire as an influence, and said they "were primarily inspired by MC5."

In 1982, the Lorries' manager Dave Hall provided independent record label Red Rhino with a cassette of the group's demos. Impressed by the quality of the songs, Red Rhino label head "Tony K" (Tony Kostrzewa) signed the band and immediately released "Beating My Head" unchanged from the demo as the band's debut single. The song made a strong appearance on the influential NME independent record chart. Fagan and Smith soon departed the band, to be replaced by Dave Wolfenden and Paul Southern respectively. Afterwards, bassist Southern was replaced by Leon Phillips. While numerous additional personnel changes would occur in the history of the band, Wolfenden became a mainstay and a frequent songwriting partner of Reed's during the band's most productive period. In 1983 and 1984, the band released several more singles (including "He's Read" and "Monkeys On Juice", which reached No. 9 on the NME indie chart). John Peel was an early supporter, and the band recorded two radio sessions for him in March and November 1983 (released on CD in 2014 as BBC Sessions 1983 - 1984, part of the band's 3-CD compilation See the Fire).

In 1985, the band's debut album, Talk About the Weather, was released and peaked at No. 3 on the NME independent albums chart. The album, which most fans consider to be the band's best, received generally positive reviews and sold well for a small label offering. "Hollow Eyes", a single taken from the album, attained good sales as well, as did follow-up non-LP singles "Chance" and "Spinning Round", the latter of which is generally felt to be the Lorries's strongest song.

The band released one more album on Red Rhino (Paint Your Wagon, which reached No. 1 on the UK Independent Singles and Albums Charts and No. 3 on the NME indie chart) in 1986, a single ("Cut Down") and a four track EP ("Crawling Mantra", utilizing the one-time band name change to "The Lorries"), before signing to Situation Two, an offshoot of Beggars Banquet Records. Two albums followed, 1988's Nothing Wrong and 1989's Blow. Neither of the Beggars Banquet albums appeared on any mainstream pop charts. Singles, including "Only Dreaming (Wide Awake)" and "Open Up" (which upon its release was chosen as NME’s 'Single of the Week'), also failed to chart, and the band was subsequently dropped by the label. In 1991, the band released a further single, "Talking Back", and then the Blasting Off album on the tiny Sparkhead label, after which Reed broke up what was left of the band.

In 2003, Reed revived the name Red Lorry Yellow Lorry and released four new songs in 2004, available via internet download only on the band's website. The band toured frequently in the UK during 2004 and 2005, but although journalist Mick Mercer wrote in 2014 that "new material is on its way", no additional Red Lorry Yellow Lorry music was subsequently released until 2024. In 2005, the band released Thunder in the Black Cave, a live DVD recorded in Belgium during their 2004 European tour. On November 14, 2005, Reed released an acoustic-based album, Minimal Animal, under the name 'Chris Reed Unit'.

In 2024, the band released their first new material in almost 20 years with the track "Driving Black" posted on their website.

== Discography ==
- Talk About the Weather (1985)
- Paint Your Wagon (1986)
- Nothing Wrong (1988)
- Blow (1989)
- Blasting Off (1991)
- Strange Kind of Paradise (2025)
