= Russian Industrial Tribute to Die Krupps =

Compilation album by Various Artists
- Released: July 31, 2013
- Recorded: 2013
- Genres: Industrial; EBM; metal
- Length: 112:42
- Label: Artificial Sun

Russian Industrial Tribute to Die Krupps is a 2013 tribute album to the German industrial/EBM band, Die Krupps, by various artists.

== Track listing ==
Disc one "Metal Works"

1. "To the Hilt " (II - The Final Option, 1993) - Type V Blood
2. "The Gods of Void" (Paradise Now, 1997) - Bog-Morok
3. "Risikofaktor (Panzertank Version)" (The Machinists of Joy, 2013) - Artificial Sun Union
4. "Reconstruction" (Paradise Now, 1997) - Сонцесвiт
5. "Crossfire" (II - The Final Option, 1993) - Dexessus
6. "The Last Flood" (III - Odyssey of the Mind, 1995) - Rosa Infra
7. "Iron Man" (II - The Final Option, 1993) - Mystterra
8. "Paradise of Sin" (II - The Final Option, 1993) - Игольчатый смех
9. "Fatherland" (II - The Final Option, 1993) - Reactor
10. "5 Millionen" (Too Much History Vol. 1: Electro Years, 2007) - Panzertank
11. "Fur einen Augenblick" (Volle Kraft voraus!, 1982) - Schwarztag
12. "Alive" (III - Odyssey of the Mind, 1995) - Magik Brite
13. "Moving Beyond" (Paradise Now, 1997) - Ungrace
14. "Risikofaktor" (The Machinists of Joy, 2013) - Artificial Sun Union

Disc two "Electro Works"

1. "Machineries of Joy " (The Machinists of Joy, 2013) - DBS
2. "Tod und Teufel" (Volle Kraft voraus!, 1982) - Distorted World
3. "Odyssey of the Mind" (III - Odyssey of the Mind, 1995) - Electric Resistance
4. "Goldfinger" (Volle Kraft voraus!, 1982) - Nova State Machine
5. "Black Beauty White Heat" (Paradise Now, 1997) - C_File
6. "Volle Kraft voraus" (Volle Kraft voraus!, 1982) - Anthracitic Moths
7. "Scent" (III - Odyssey of the Mind, 1995) - Sector 516
8. "Doppelgänger" (I, 1992) - t-U.Bus
9. "Low Life High Tech" (I, 1992) - Strong Product
10. "Der Amboss" (Too Much History Vol. 1: Electro Years, 2007) - Ultimate Soldier
11. "Stahlwerksinfonie" (Stahlwerksinfonie & Wahre Arbeit - Wahrer Lohn, 1993) - Range Of Dives
12. "Risikofaktor (Russian Version)" (The Machinists of Joy, 2013) - Artificial Sun Union

== See also ==
- Die Krupps
- Industrial music
