= The Machinists of Joy =

Studio album by Die Krupps
- Released: 25 October 2013
- Recorded: Atom H Studios, Austin, Texas
- Genres: Industrial, EBM
- Length: 49:26
- Label: Synthetic Symphony
- Producers: Jürgen Engler, Chris Lietz

Die Krupps chronology
| Als wären wir für immer (2010) | The Machinists of Joy (2013) | V – Metal Machine Music (2015) |

Singles from The Machinists of Joy
- 1. "Industrie-Mädchen" Released: April 23, 2012; 2. "Risikofaktor" Released: January 28, 2013; 3. "Nazis Auf Speed" Released: December 20, 2013; 4. "Robo Sapien" Released: June 00, 2014

The Machinists of Joy is the eighth studio album by German Industrial/EBM band Die Krupps. The album was released on 25 October 2013 in four formats: normal digipak CD, limited two-CD digipak, a fan box and as a limited LP/CD combo. It was released though German record label Synthetic Symphony.

The album is a tribute to the band's past. It harkens back to the Düsseldorf Punk scene before their first release Stahlwerksynfonie, abandoning the metal sound of their 90s work. The album derives its name from one of the band's earlier tracks 'Machineries of Joy', a cover of Wahre Arbeit Wahrer Lohn done by Ralf Dörper and Nitzer Ebb in 1989.

The album includes collaboration with Métal Urbain and Dernière Volonté. Its album cover is a homage to the album Metal Machine Music.

== Promotion ==
The single Risikofaktor was accompanied by a music video which was released on January 23, 2013. On December 20, 2013 the band followed up with a video for limited edition track Nazis auf Speed, which was directed by Philipp Virus. The band announced a fan director video contest for the track Schmutzfabrik. Also other fan videos were published on official Die Krupps online resources. An official music video - sporting cyberpunk dystopian design - also supported the last single off the album, Robo Sapien, which presented The Red Line, a track to be included on the follow-up studio album one year later. A live version of Robo Sapien was also released on Sonic Seducer magazines M'era Luna Festival 2014 DVD in autumn.

In 2014 the band went on tour in Europe with Vigilante and Chant. Preceding the tour, die Krupps let their fans participate in a vote on which songs from The Machinists of Joy they should play on tour.

== Critical reception ==
Professional ratings
Review scores
| Source | Rating |
|---|---|
| COMA | Favorable |
| Head Full of Noise | 4.5/5 stars |
| I Die: You Die | Favorable |
| Intravenous | Favorable |
| Reflections of Darkness | 9/10 |
| Release | 8/10 |
| Santa Sangre | Favorable |
| Side-Line | 8/10 |

Fredrik Schlatta Wik of Release Magazine noted the band's change of style compared to the previous album Paradise Now and said, "'The Machinists of Joy' is aptly named; the main theme of the album is industrial old-school EBM, with fantastic melodic basslines and poses a return to the Die Krupps' roots and form." "The Metal days are definitely over, even though there are still a lot of guitars on many tracks of the new album", wrote J. Niggels Uhlenbruch of Reflections of Darkness, "But guitarist Marcel Zuercher takes rather a back seat and allows his riffs and licks to support the compositions and rhythms where necessary instead of steamrolling entire songs." Uhlenbruch added, "This path goes back to the roots, and this is not only true for the music but also for the lyrics and the imagery Die Krupps use."

The Machinists of Joy received favorable reviews. Grant V. Ziegler of COMA Music Magazine wrote, "For its driving force, perfect execution of synths and balanced lyrical and vocal attacks, The Machinists of Joy is a must own for all Industrial music fans." Dominic Lynch of Intravenous Magazine called the album "an achievement".

However, Release Magazine's Fredrik Schlatta Wik thought The Machinists of Joy would not win Die Krupps many new fans: "So is this album going to appeal to a new audience? Doubtful. Are the old fans [...] going to like it? Undoubtedly yes."

== Track list ==
| No. | Title | Lyrics | Music | Length |
|---|---|---|---|---|
| 1. | "Ein Blick zurück im Zorn" | Ralf Dörper, Engler | Jürgen Engler, Marcel Zürcher | 4:09 |
| 2. | "Schmutzfabrik" | Dörper, Engler | Engler | 4:18 |
| 3. | "Risikofaktor" | Engler, Dörper | Engler, Chris Lietz | 3:34 |
| 4. | "Robo Sapien" | Engler, Dörper | Engler, Lietz | 5:12 |
| 5. | "The Machinist of Joy" | Dörper, Engler | Engler | 4:40 |
| 6. | "Essenbeck" | Dörper | Engler, Lietz | 4:06 |
| 7. | "Im falschen Land" | Dörper | Engler, Zürcher | 3:37 |
| 8. | "Part of the Machine" | Dörper | Engler | 4:32 |
| 9. | "Eiskalter Engel" | Engler | Engler | 4:34 |
| 10. | "Nocebo" | Dörper | Engler, Zürcher | 4:10 |
| 11. | "Im Schatten der Ringe" | Dörper, Engler | Engler | 6:34 |

Limited edition additional tracks
| No. | Title | Lyrics | Music | Length |
|---|---|---|---|---|
| 1. | "Nazis auf Speed" | Dörper | Engler, Zürcher | 5:31 |
| 2. | "Panik" (Métal Urbain cover feat. Eric Débris of Métal Urbain) | Eric Débris | Rikky Darling | 2:19 |
| 3. | "Sans Fin" (Feat. Geoffroy D of Dernière Volonté) | Geoffroy D, Engler | Engler, Lietz | 4:23 |
| 4. | "Neue Helden" (Remixed by Claus Larsen of Leather Strip) | Dörper | Engler | 4:40 |
| 5. | "Industrie-Mädchen" (S.Y.P.H. cover) | Thomas Schwebel | Uwe Jahnke | 4:04 |
| Total length: | | | | 20.57 |

== Personnel ==
- Jürgen Engler – vocals, keyboards, metal percussion, guitars
- Ralf Dörper – samples
- Marcel Zürcher – guitars, keyboards
- Sascha Osterland – artwork

== Charts ==
| Chart (2013) | Peak position |
|---|---|
| Deutsche Alternative Chart | 1 |
