= Funkatron =

Studio album by Cult of Jester
- Released: 1998
- Genres: Industrial rock; electronic
- Length: 57:48
- Label: Flaming Fish
- Producer: Ed Finkler

Cult of Jester chronology
Winky Dink and You (1997)	Funkatron (1998)	Golgo 13 (2000)

Funkatron is the debut studio album of Cult of Jester, released in 1998 by Flaming Fish. The song "John Carpenter", which originally appeared on the Awaiting the Dawn various artists compilation, was released on the 2017 digital remaster.

== Reception ==
The Phantom Tollbooth commended the Funkatron's humor but criticized the lyrics for being "anti-Christian", calling it an "impressive yet uninspiring hour's worth of music that will either offend, intrigue, or amuse you." Despite this, the critic said "I found the album to be well layered with a solid mix, and a great effort all the way musically" and "every song has a killer groove or loop in there somewhere, and when it hits, it hits hard"

== Track listing ==
All tracks are written by Ed Finkler, except "Lucretia My Reflection" by Larry Alexander and Andrew Eldritch.

No.	Title	Length
1.	"Teenage Warhead"	2:45
2.	"Retro O.G."	3:34
3.	"One More Time"	2:11
4.	"Funkatron"	3:42
5.	"P-Mondo"	4:03
6.	"Lucretia My Reflection" (The Sisters of Mercy cover)	6:35
7.	"Posies"	2:56
8.	"Ripple 'n Hookers"	3:59
9.	"Master V3"	5:13
10.	"Gana Trip"	5:44
16.	"Teenage Warhead" (Mendoza Remix)	4:45
17.	"Retro O.G." (ETF Original Remix)	3:28
18.	"Retro O.G." (Pimp Remix)	4:25
19.	"Ripple 'n Hookers" (Steve Jobs Remix)	4:09

Digital reissue bonus tracks
No.	Title	Length
20.	"Master V2"	5:09
21.	"Master V1" (Construction 009 Mix)	3:57
22.	"Sock Monkey"	4:31
23.	"Where No Shadows Fall"	7:09
24.	"John Carpenter"	7:37

Notes

- Tracks 11–15 consist of four seconds of silence each

== Personnel ==
Adapted from the Funkatron liner notes.

Cult of Jester

- Ed Finkler – vocals, instruments, production

Production and design

- Carson Pierce – executive-producer

== Release history ==
Region	Date	Label	Format	Catalog
Canada	1998	Flaming Fish	CD	FFM019
Canada	2018	Flaming Fish	DL	FFM006
