= Winky Dink and You (EP) =

EP by Cult of Jester
- Released: 1997
- Genre: Industrial rock; electronic
- Label: Flaming Fish

Cult of Jester chronology
Winky Dink and You (1997)	Funkatron (1998)

Beneath the Moon is the debut EP by Cult of Jester, released in 1997 by Flaming Fish. All songs with the exception of "Silent" appeared on Cult of Jester's 1998 debut album Funkatron. The album contains none of the tracks from Cult of Jester's two prior demo tapes.

== Track listing ==
All tracks are written by Ed Finkler, except "Lucretia My Reflection" by Larry Alexander and Andrew Eldritch

Side one
No.	Title	Length
1.	"Teenage Warhead"
2.	"Retro O.G."
3.	"Ripple n' Hookers"

Side two
No.	Title	Length
1.	"Lucretia My Reflection" (The Sisters of Mercy cover)
2.	"Silent"
3.	"Gana Trip"

== Personnel ==
Adapted from the Winky Dink and You liner notes.

Cult of Jester

- Ed Finkler – vocals, instruments, arrangements

== Release history ==
Region	Date	Label	Format	Catalog
Canada	1997	Flaming Fish	CS	FFMCS004
