= Male (band) =

German punk band

- Origin: 1976
- Genres: Punk
- Years active: 1976–1980, 1990, 2002–present
- Members: (original members) Jürgen Engler, Bernward Malaka, Stefan Schwaab, Claus Ritter

Male is a punk band founded in 1976 in Düsseldorf-Bilk. They were one of the first German punk bands and a precursor for the Neuen Deutschen Welle. They were also one of the first punk bands to write lyrics in German.

== History ==
The band was founded in December 1976 in Düsseldorf by Jürgen Engler, Bernward Malaka, Stefan Schwaab, and Claus Ritter. Their first concert was in March 1977 at the Ratinger Hof. They played at several important early festivals connected with the punk scene in Germany: the opening of the SO36 in Berlin in 1978, and the "Into the Future" festival at the Markethalle in Hamburg, in 1979. In 1979 they released their only LP, Zensur & Zensur, which was the first punk album in the German language. This was quickly followed by the release of the single Clever und Smart. In May 1980, Male toured Germany with the UK punk band The Clash. During that tour, they opened for The Clash's concert at the Philipshalle in Düsseldorf.

Because they were releasing a new single, with a sound oriented toward electronic music, Male changed its band name to "Vorsprung" in 1980. Shortly thereafter, the band broke up. Engler and Malaka founded a new band called Die Krupps. Schwaab and Ritter founded the band "Freunde der Nacht," which developed a new-wave sound.

In 1990 Male reformed for a reunion tour. In the 1990s, Engler immigrated to the United States. Since 2002, Male continues to play concerts with their original line-up.

== Discography ==
=== Albums and singles ===
- "Zensur & Zensur", LP, 1979
- "Clever & Smart/Casablanca", 7", 1979
- "Technoland/Balla Balla", 7" (as Vorsprung), 1980
- "No future in 1977", 7" (Recorded 1977), 1990
- "Die Toten Hosen Ihre Party", 7", 1991
- "Zensur & Zensur", CD (re-release with 8 new songs), 1995
- "Grosseinsatz 1977-1994", double-CD, 2003

=== Compilations ===
- "S.O.36", LP, 1978, Polizei (live)
- "Into the future", LP, 1979, Heimatland (live), Zensur & Zensur (live), 1 Tag in Düsseldorf (live)
- "In die Zukunft", LP, 1980, Vaterland (live), Sirenen (live), Risikofaktor 1:x (live)
- "Denk Daran", LP, 1980, Weisses Trauma (Vorsprung)

== Literature ==
- Sven-André Dreyer, Michael Wenzel, Thomas Stelzmann: Keine Atempause – Musik aus Düsseldorf, Droste, Düsseldorf 2018, 192 S., ISBN 978-3-7700-2067-6
