= Artificial sun =

Artificial sun may refer to:

- Artificial Sun (Russian label), a Russian record label
- Artificial sunlight
- Laser Mégajoule, near Bordeaux, France
- National Ignition Facility, at the Lawrence Livermore National Laboratory in Livermore, California
- Experimental Advanced Superconducting Tokamak, at the Hefei Institutes of Physical Science in Hefei, China
- Znamya (space mirror), an orbital space mirror
- Fusion power
- Tanning booth
