= Elektrozorn Vol. 1 =

Compilation album by Various Artists
- Released: January 31, 2014
- Genres: Industrial, EBM
- Length: 78:50
- Label: Artificial Sun

Elektrozorn Vol. 1 is a 2014 promo Industrial/EBM compilation album of exclusive and never-released before music by various artists special for Russian subcultural "Bunker" magazine.

== Track listing ==
No.	Title	Artist	Length
1.	"Hell-as Imperial"	Nano Infect feat. PreEmptive Strike 0.1	05:48
2.	"Adios, Puta! (Dn't-stp-me-btch Remix By D.T.F.N.)"	Encono	03:46
3.	"Hell As Phoenix Rises (Type V Blood Remix)"	Hydra Division V	04:37
4.	"Insane Club (Elektrozorn Version)"	Emotion For Rent feat. Daria Konst	03:42
5.	"Out Of Control (Technolorgy Remix)"	Chamaeleon	03:38
6.	"Our Dark Rise (Sadiztik Injektion Terror Body Mix)"	C-Lekktor	06:18
7.	"Endless Agony (Elektrozorn Version)"	Distorted World	05:20
8.	"Грязь Земли"	Otto Dix	04:24
9.	"Resistance"	Electric Resistance	05:04
10.	"Fuer Einen Augenblick (Live In Belgium)"	Die Krupps	05:04
11.	"Worauf Wartest Du Denn (Elektrozorn Version)"	DBS	04:05
12.	"Mummies And Music Boxes (Electric Resistance Remix)"	Pittersplatter	03:31
13.	"The Portal"	Cryo	06:15
14.	"Испей меня (Shamaniac ReVision Remix)"	DreamVeil	03:07
15.	"We Came To Party (GreeNOX Remix)"	T3RR0R 3RR0R	03:04
16.	"Квітка забуття (Elektrozorn Version)"	AndrosLand	03:14
17.	"Mechanical Man"	Ultimate Soldier	04:15
18.	"Eternity (Elektrozorn Version)"	Albert Pak	04:10
Total length:			78:50

== See also ==
- Industrial music
- Electronic body music
