= Rings of Steel =

Compilation album by Die Krupps
- Released: 1995
- Genre: EBM, Industrial
- Length: 74:36 minutes
- Label: Cleopatra Records

Professional ratings
Review scores
Source	Rating
AllMusic	2.5/5 stars
Infectious Substance	Favourable

Rings of Steel is a compilation album by German industrial rock/EBM band Die Krupps. It was released in May 1995 via Cleopatra Records and targeted towards the US markets.

The album combines tracks from I, II - The Final Option (1993), and the remix album The Final Remixes (1994). It features remixes by members of bands including Biohazard, Clawfinger, KMFDM, Charlie Clouser, Einstürzende Neubauten, The Sisters of Mercy and Carcass.

== Track listing ==
1. "Bloodsuckers (Bela B. of Die Ärzte/Gørdi Gerhardt Remix)" – 5:37
2. "To the Hilt (Remixed by Erlend Ottem & Jocke Skog of Clawfinger)" – 3:39
3. "Crossfire (Jim Martin Remix)" – 4:46
4. "Language of Reality (Charlie Clouser/Mick Cripps Remix)" – 4:41
5. "Fatherland (Remixed by Andrew Eldritch & Rodney Orpheus)" – 4:37
6. "Worst Case Scenario (Remixed by White Child Rix of Gunshot)" – 3:35
7. "Paradise of Sin (Luc van Acker Remix)" – 4:01
8. "Iron Man (Remixed by Sascha of KMFDM & Chris Shepard)" – 4:50
9. "Inside Out (Jeff Walker Remix)" – 5:11
10. "New Temptation (F.M. Einheit Remix)" – 3:36
11. "Metal Machine Music" – 5:14
12. "Shellshocked" – 3:35
13. "Bloodsuckers [Die Krupps with Biohazard]" – 4:03
14. "Language of Reality" – 4:09
15. "Worst Case Scenario" – 4:18
16. "To the Hilt" – 4:47
17. "New Temptation" – 3:57
