= V – Metal Machine Music =

Studio album by Die Krupps
- Released: 28 August 2015
- Studio: Atom H Studios, Austin, Texas; Monochrom Studio, Hamburg, Germany
- Genre: Industrial metal; groove metal; EBM
- Length: 49:09
- Label: Oblivion
- Producer: Jürgen Engler, Chris Lietz

Die Krupps chronology
| The Machinists of Joy (2013) | V – Metal Machine Music (2015) | Vision 2020 Vision (2019) |

Singles from The Machinists of Joy
- 1. "Battle Extreme / Fly Martyrs Fly" Released: 14 August 2015; 2. "Kaltes Herz" Released: 16 October 2015; 3. "Alive In A Glass Cage" Released: 28 July 2016

Professional ratings
Review scores
| Source | Rating |
|---|---|
| The Electricity Club | Favourable |
| The Midlands Rocks | 8/10 |
| Power of Metal.dk | 9/10 |
| Reflections of Darkness | 8/10 |
| Release | 6/10 |
| Side-Line | 8.5/10 |
| Terrorizer | 7.5/10 |

V – Metal Machine Music is the ninth studio album by German Industrial/EBM band Die Krupps. It was released on 28 August 2015 as digital download and double CD as well as limited bundles. The album was released through record labels Steamhammer and Metropolis Records.

== Background ==
The album sees the band returning "to a distinctly guitar-heavy sound". The album derives its name from one of the band's earlier tracks, "Metal Machine Music", a single off the Album I, itself a tribute to Lou Reed's album Metal Machine Music, which Jürgen Engler credits as a strong influence on the band.

"Die Verdammten" is a guitar enriched rework of the tour intro the band had used on their 2011 and 2014 tours. "The Vampire Strikes Back" is a rework of a song previously released on a Wing Commander original soundtrack album in 1998, thus being the band's last song recorded prior to its temporary breakup. "Alive in a Glass Cage", "Road Rage Warrior" and "Volle Kraft voraus" are also older songs that were re-recorded. "The Red Line" was first released in an alternate version in 2014 as a B-Side to the "Robo Sapien" single.

== Reception ==
Alex Boniwell from Terrorizer thought that the album is "reminiscent of their late '80s/early '90s output but with a bigger, crunchier production" and wrote, "'V' gives out what you'd expect from these consistently good pioneers of industrial – solid, pounding beats, thick danceable riffs, great synth sounds and a gloriously sneering vocal from Die Krupps main man Jürgen Engler".

== Track listing ==
All music is composed by Jürgen Engler and Marcel Zürcher, except where noted.

Disc 1
| No. | Title | Lyrics | Length |
|---|---|---|---|
| 1. | "Die Verdammten (Prelude)" (music by Maurice Jarre) | | 1:03 |
| 2. | "Kaltes Herz" | Engler | 4:44 |
| 3. | "Battle Extreme" | Ralf Dörper, Engler | 3:35 |
| 4. | "Fly Martyrs Fly" | Engler, Dörper | 4:04 |
| 5. | "The Truth" | Dörper, Engler | 3:43 |
| 6. | "Road Rage Warrior" | Dörper | 3:54 |
| 7. | "The Vampire Strikes Back" (music by Engler, Chris Lietz) | Engler | 3:26 |
| 8. | "Alive in a Glass Cage" (music by Engler, Lietz) | Dörper, Engler | 4:10 |
| 9. | "Branded" | Dörper, Engler | 3:48 |
| 10. | "Kaos Reigns" | Dörper | 3:24 |
| 11. | "The Red Line" | Dörper | 4:57 |
| 12. | "Bonded By Blood" | Dörper, Engler | 4:24 |
| 13. | "Volle Kraft Voraus" (music by Engler) | Engler, Christina Schnekenburger | 3:28 |

Disc 2
| No. | Title | Lyrics | Length |
|---|---|---|---|
| 1. | "Kaltes Herz (Reworked by Darkhaus)" | Engler | 4:09 |
| 2. | "Alive in a Glass Cage (Remixed by Faderhead)" (music by Engler, Lietz) | Dörper, Engler | 4:38 |
| 3. | "Road Rage Warrior '82" (music by Engler) | Engler | 3:14 |
| 4. | "Battle Extreme (Demo)" | Ralf Dörper, Engler | 3:35 |
| 5. | "Kaos Reigns (Demo)" | Dörper | 3:25 |
| 6. | "The Vampire Strikes Back (Demo)" (music by Engler, Chris Lietz) | Engler | 3:30 |
| 7. | "Kaltes Herz (Demo)" | Engler | 4:42 |
| 8. | "Alive in a Glass Cage (Demo)" (music by Engler, Lietz) | Dörper, Engler | 4:18 |
| Total length: | | | 31:41 |

== Singles ==
"Battle Extreme / Fly Martyrs Fly" was released two weeks prior to the album with a lyric video accompanying the A-Side. "Kaltes Herz" followed in late 2015, with "Branded" as the B-Side, supported by a promo video directed by Faderhead. "Alive in a Glass Cage" was released prior to the band's first ever Wacken Open Air gig. The track was re-recorded as a collaboration with Caliban. The single featured a remix of the title track by Chant, a project of Die Krupps' 2014 live drummer, and a live recording of "Nazis on Speed" in Berlin from 2015. Video footage for another promo clip, "Road Rage Warrior", was shot during the "Kaltes Herz" recording session according to the official band page, but has not been released to date.

== Personnel ==
Die Krupps

- Jürgen Engler – vocals, keyboards, guitar on "Alive in a Glass Cage", cover concept, recording, production
- Ralf Dörper – noise-synthetics
- Marcel Zürcher – guitars, keyboards

Technical personnel

- Chris Lietz – production
- Alex Henke – additional guitar recording
- Franz Schepers – band photo
- Éric Débris – photos (Jürgen Engler, hot rod)
- Dennis Hom – hot rod (front cover)
- Jennifer Heibel – hot rod (booklet)
- Darrell Heibel – hot rod (booklet)
- Sascha Osterland – artwork

== Chart positions ==
| Chart (2015) | Peak position |
|---|---|
| German Albums (Offizielle Top 100) | 49 |
