= Dernière Volonté =

French musical ensemble

- Origin: France
- Genres: Martial industrial, military pop, Coldwave, Darkwave, Neofolk
- Members: Geoffroy D

Dernière Volonté ("Last Will") is the post-industrial project of French musician Geoffroy D, formed in the mid-1990s. With roots in the martial industrial genre, in subsequent decades the project evolved to incorporate elements of synth-pop with more melodic structures. In 2026, the project released the album Cendre.

== Background ==
Throughout an 'industrial' early period, Geoffroy tended to write a fusion of martial music and dark ambient. Choosing to focus on atmosphere, militaristic rhythms, and historical samples, he left little emphasis to be placed on vocals and melody.

With the release of his 2003 effort, Les Blessures de l'Ombre, Dernière Volonté took a new direction, combining martial percussion with melodic vocals and symphonic and ambient interludes.

=== Influence of side projects ===
In 2008, Geoffroy started an electronic side-project called Position Parallèle which fused together EBM with minimal wave style sounds. This led to a more distinctly synthpop sound being carried over into his work as Dernière Volonté as well.

His 2016 album, Prie Pour Moi, shifted his sound toward more neofolk instrumentation with less emphasis on synthesizers. A new Position Parallèle album, titled En Garde à Vue, was released in 2017.

=== Themes and references ===
Early Dernière Volonté made some references to Nazism in their earliest industrial period, such as in the song Le travail rend libre (the phrase "Arbeit Macht Frei" in French) from the first release. Geoffroy has since then distanced himself from such politics and made statements against it, and the majority of his discography has no political themes.

Geoffroy is featured as a guest artist on the Der Blutharsch albums, with Nový Svět and Die Krupps. The band still plays occasional live shows.

== Discography ==
=== Studio albums ===
- Obeir et Mourir (1998)
- Le Feu Sacré (2000)
- Les Blessures de l'Ombre (2003)
- Devant le Miroir (2006)
- Immortel (2010)
- Mon Meilleur Ennemi (2012)
- Prie Pour Moi (2016)
- Frontière (2019)
- Cristal (2022)
- Cendre (2026)

=== Compilations ===
- Commémoration (2004)
- Ne Te Retourne Pas (2012)

=== Singles & EPs ===
- En Avant! (1999)
- Commandements (2000)
- Où Tu Iras (2001)
- Mon Mercenaire! / El Continent! - with Nový Svět (2002)
- Untitled - with Der Blutharsch (2006)
- Le Cheval de Troie (2007)
- Toujours (2007)
- La Nuit Revient (2008)

=== Side Projects ===
- Blasterkorps – Blasterkorps (1997)
- Blasterkorps – La Justice des Hommes: Chapitre I (2003)
- Blasterkorps – La Justice des Hommes: Chapitre II (2003)
- Position Parallèle – Position Parallèle (2008)
- Position Parallèle – Néons Blancs (2013)
- Blasterkorps – Nos Années Mortes: 1996/2002 (2015)
- Position Parallèle – En Garde à Vue (2017)
- Position Parallèle – Escalier de Service (2018)
- Position Parallèle – Mélodies en Sous-Sols (2020)
- Position Parallèle – Aiguille À Découdre (2024)
