= Les hommes morts sont dangereux =

Studio album by Métal Urbain
- Released: 1981, re-released December 2003
- Recorded: 1977 (earliest singles), 2003 (latest remixes)
- Genre: Punk rock, noise punk, post-punk
- Label: Celluloid, Bizz Records (original), Seventeen Records (re-releases), Felicity, Polystar (Japanese re-release)
- Producer: Tony Platt, Doug Bennett

Métal Urbain chronology
Les hommes morts sont dangereux (1981)	L'age d'or (fan-club compilation) (1985)

Professional ratings
Review scores
Source	Rating
AllMusic	link

Les Hommes Morts sont Dangereux (English: Dead Men are Dangerous) is the only studio album by the French electro-punk band Métal Urbain. The album was originally released in 1981 on vinyl.

Songs on the album are a compilation of the group's singles from the previous three years ("Paris Maquis", "Hystérie connective" and "Panik") and John Peel BBC Radio 1 session recordings.

== Re-releases ==
Hommes morts was re-released on CD on 1 October 2006 in France as a limited & signed 25th anniversary vinyl replica CD edition, with two bonus tracks on Seventeen Records, Métal Urbain right owners. A re-release in Japan from Polystar under licence from Seventeen Records in December 2003 took the form of a double CD with more additional tracks.

== Personnel ==
- Clode Panik (vocals)
- Pat Lüger (guitar)
- Hermann Schwartz (guitar)
- Eric Débris (drum machine)
- Zip Zinc (synthesiser)
- Rikky Darling (guitar)
- Miss OD (vocals on "Lady Coca Cola")

== Track listing ==
1. "Hystérie Connective"
2. "Ghetto" (John Peel session)
3. "Clé de Contact"
4. "Lady Coca Cola"
5. "Panik"
6. "Futurama" (Peel session)
7. "Snuff Movie"
8. "Numéro Zéro" (Peel session)
9. "Paris Maquis"
10. "Pop Poubelle"
11. "50/50" (Peel session)
12. "Ultra Violence"
13. "Anarchie au Palace" (Peel session)
14. "E 202" (Peel session)
15. "Crève Salope"
16. "Hystérie Connective (mix 2)" (2006 CD bonus track originally offered on a bonus single included in the first 1000 LPs)
17. "Atlantis" (2006 CD bonus track originally offered on a bonus single included in the first 1000 LPs)

Japan bonus CD 2003:

1. "Hystérie Connective (mix 2)"
2. "Atlantis"
3. "Une Bite, un Cul et Quelques Monstres"
4. "Untitled Instrumental 1*"
5. "Untitled Instrumental 2*"
6. "Untitled Instrumental 3*"
7. "Sweet Marylin" (by Metal Boys, a band featuring Métal Urbain's Hermann Schwarz, Pat Lüger and Eric Débris - this was their only single, released on Rough Trade Records in 1979)
8. "Fugue for a Darkening Island" (the B-side of the above single)
9. "Snuff Movie (dangerous mix)"
10. "Train Demo Version 1 (demo '79)"
11. "Train 2 (version 2 '79)"
12. "Colt 45 (demo '79)"
13. "Amour (demo '79)"
14. "Little Girl of Love (unissued demo '79)"
15. "Tango Sudiste ('82 reformation demo track)"
