= Andrew Eldritch =

English rock vocalist

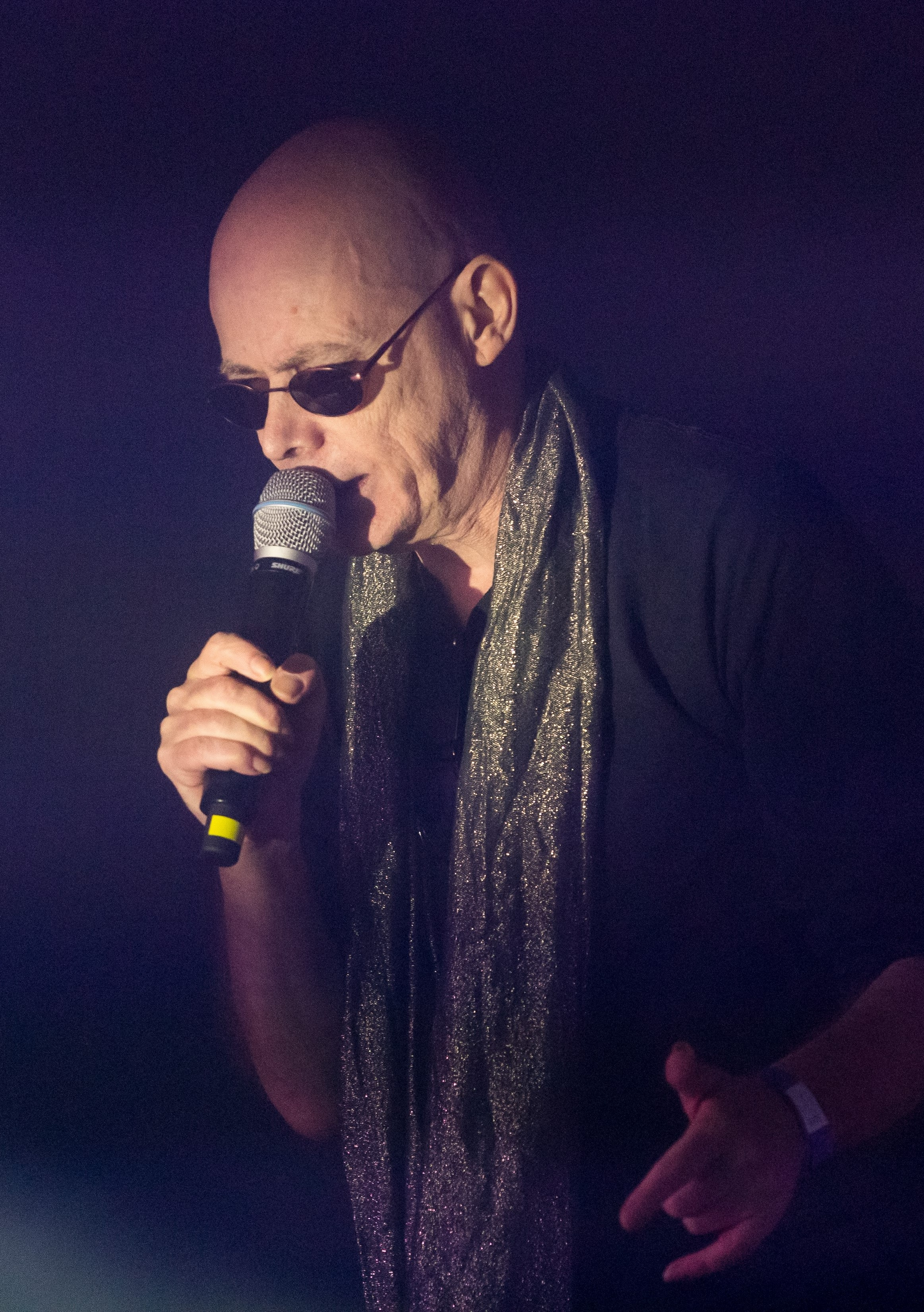
- Eldritch performing with the Sisters of Mercy at Wacken Open Air 2019

Background information
- Born: Andrew William Harvey Taylor; 15 May 1959 (age 67); Ely, Cambridgeshire, England
- Genres: Gothic rock; post-punk; darkwave; hard rock
- Instruments: Vocals; guitar; keyboards; drum machine; drums; percussion; bass guitar
- Label: Merciful Release
- Member of: The Sisters of Mercy
- Formerly of: The Sisterhood; SSV

Andrew Eldritch (born Andrew William Harvey Taylor, 15 May 1959) is an English singer, songwriter and musician. He is the lead vocalist and only remaining original member of the Sisters of Mercy, a band that emerged from the British post-punk scene, transformed into a gothic rock band, and, in later years, flirted with hard rock.

Formerly a drummer, Eldritch also programs the tracks for the Sisters of Mercy's drum machine (known as "Doktor Avalanche") and plays guitars and keyboards in its studio recordings but uses live shows to focus solely on his vocal performance. Eldritch is well known for his deep and melancholic bass-baritone singing voice as well as his poetic and sometimes politically charged lyrics.

The Sisters of Mercy is regarded as a major influence on gothic rock, and Eldritch, with his former shock of black hair, bass-baritone vocal style, prominent cheekbones and pale and thin look, was described in the media as a poster boy for the genre, earning him the label "the Godfather of Goth", which he frequently rejects.

He also established the record label Merciful Release. In addition to the Sisters of Mercy, in 1986 Andrew Eldritch established a side-project, the Sisterhood, which was quickly abandoned in favour of continuing working under the Sisters of Mercy.

== Early life and education ==
Andrew Eldritch was born on 15 May 1959 in the small cathedral city Ely. He later wrote a piano song named "1959", referring to the year of his birth and starting with the line "Living as an angel in the place that I was born".

Eldritch studied French and German literature at the University of Oxford before moving to Leeds around 1978 to study Mandarin Chinese at the University of Leeds: he left both courses before graduating. He speaks fluent French and German and has some knowledge of Dutch, Italian, Russian, Serbian, Croatian, and Latin, but stated he had forgotten the Chinese he learned. During this period, Eldritch was a freelance drummer in the local Leeds punk scene.

== Musical career ==
=== The Sisters of Mercy ===
In 1980, Eldritch and Gary Marx formed the Sisters of Mercy. On the first single, "Damage Done/Watch/Home of the Hit-men", Eldritch played the drums, a task he was later relieved of by a series of drum machines referred to as Doktor Avalanche, allowing him instead to focus on his vocal performance. Over the years, nine members have left the group, several of them citing conflicts with the frontman as a reason for their departure. These former members include Patricia Morrison, who claimed she had been paid an average of £300 per month; and Wayne Hussey, with whom Eldritch had a personal feud which contributed to heavy criticism of both by the music press during the 1980s. Hussey formed a breakaway band called the Mission as a result of this conflict.

Following the release of the band's last studio album to date, Vision Thing (1990), Eldritch initiated a 1991 US tour of the Sisters of Mercy in a triple bill with Gang of Four and American hip hop group Public Enemy. The tour was cancelled midway and the band relocated to Europe.

In 1995 Eldritch interviewed David Bowie and Leonard Cohen for the German edition of Rolling Stone magazine. He also contributed articles on computers to German magazines. That year, he briefly rejuvenated his working relationship with erstwhile Sisters of Mercy guitarist Gary Marx. Marx wrote an album's worth of backing tracks, to which Eldritch could contribute lyrics for release as a new studio album. Eldritch eventually backed out of the project and Marx released the tracks over a decade later as a solo album.

Prevented by contractual obligations from appearing under his own name, he is also rumoured to have produced a couple of techno albums under various pseudonyms during the 1990s, a rumour he would not deny when asked about it in an interview by Alexa Williamson in May 1997. Two musical projects Eldritch set up with his label, Merciful Release, have later been confirmed as Paris Riots (a collaboration with James Ray) and Leeds Underground. Both projects were abandoned before any tracks were released to the public.

In 1997 Eldritch produced the SSV studio album Go Figure, featuring his vocals over drumless electronic music. The album finally freed him from his contractual obligations, as East West Records agreed to waive their claims for two more Sisters of Mercy albums in exchange for the recordings. The SSV tracks were, however, never officially released. The full name of the band is SSV-NSMABAAOTWMODAACOTIATW, said to be an acronym for "Screw Shareholder Value – Not So Much a Band as Another Opportunity to Waste Money on Drugs and Ammunition Courtesy of the Idiots at Time Warner".

The Sisters of Mercy tour every year, but no new recorded material has been released for sale since 1993. New songs have been created yet have only been played live.

In 2009 Eldritch gave his first interview in 12 years to Classic Rock writer Joel McIver, in which he rejected the need for any new recorded material from the Sisters and talked at length about the band's career.

Speculation about a new Sisters of Mercy studio album release was renewed in November 2016 when Eldritch was quoted by TeamRock website: "I can tell you one thing: If Donald Trump actually does become President, that will be reason enough for me to release another album. I don't think I could keep quiet if that happened." As of October 2026, no new album has been released.

=== Gothic associations ===
Though Andrew Eldritch has been called the "Godfather of Goth", for inspiring and defining the gothic scene musically and aesthetically, the Sisters of Mercy, despite being formed in 1980, were originally not very popular in the early-1980s post-punk subgenre of bands and music fans which the British press had labelled goth.

Since the early 1990s, Eldritch has publicly rejected associations with the goth subculture. He describes the Sisters of Mercy as humanist, modernist, and implies he wants nothing to do with goth, stating: "it's disappointing that so many people have in all seriousness adopted just one of our many one-week-of-stupid-clothes benders." He also notes: "I'm constantly confronted by representatives of popular culture who are far more goth than we, yet I have only to wear black socks to be stigmatised as the demon overlord."

=== Guest appearances ===
- Gary Moore – After the War (1989) – Backing vocals on "After the War", "Speak for Yourself" and "Blood of Emeralds"
- Kastrierte Philosophen – Toilet Queen (1989) – Remix of "Toilet Queen"
- Die Krupps – III - Odyssey of the Mind (1995) – Remix of "Odyssey of the Mind"
- Die Krupps – Rings of Steel (1995) – Remix of "Fatherland" (with Rodney Orpheus from the Cassandra Complex)
- Sarah Brightman – Fly (1995) – German interlude on "How Can Heaven Love Me" and backing vocals on "A Question of Honour"
- SSV – Go Figure (1997) – Sampled vocals on all songs

=== Cultural references ===
Eldritch is the subject of the song "Prince of Darkness" by fellow-Leeds band the Mekons and is also mentioned in the song "Charlie Cake Park", both of which appeared on their 1987 studio album Honky Tonkin'; he is also the subject of "Andrew Eldritch is Moving Back to Leeds" on the studio album Goths by the Mountain Goats, released 19 May 2017.
