= Cult of Jester =

American band

- Origin: West Lafayette, Indiana, United States
- Genres: Industrial rock; electronic
- Years active: 1994–present
- Label: Flaming Fish
- Past members: Ed Finkler
- Website: cultofjester.com

Cult of Jester was the music project of West Lafayette-based composer Ed Finkler. The project combined elements of breakbeat, drum and bass, EBM and hip hop into sample-based composition. Cult of Jester released two albums for Flaming Fish: Funkatron (1998) and Golgo 13 (2000).

== History ==
Cult of Jester composer Ed Finkler started out performing music while in college as a vocalist and drum programmer in the group Manhole Vortex. He began composing as a solo artist in and in 1993 recorded a demo tape as Bubblegum Crisis. In 1994 Finkler recorded his first demo as Cult of Jester which contained V1 and V2 of the "Master" composition and showcased his cartoon sampling technique. He continued to explore sample-based composition and the same year released another demo with V3 of "Master". In 1997 Cult of Jester released the EP Winky Dink and You and "John Carpenter", a song that samples from The X-Files, on the Awaiting the Dawn various artists compilation by Flaming Fish/Velvet Empire.

Cult of Jester released a debut studio album titled Funkatron on Flaming Fish Music in 1998. His second album titled Golgo 13 was released in 2000 and showcased a more guitar oriented sound. The compilation G13 LTD Demo + Remixes was released later that year. Since 1999 Finkler has been composing electronic music as Dead Agent, an instrumental project without vocals, and in 2009 released a collection of its recorded work titled Rehabilitation. In 2017 Funkatron was re-released with remastered audio and five unreleased tracks from various compilations.

== Discography ==
Studio albums

- Funkatron (1998, Flaming Fish)
- Golgo 13 (2000, Flaming Fish)

Extended play

- Winky Dink and You (1997, Flaming Fish)

Compilation albums

- G13 LTD Demo + Remixes (2000)
