= Distorted World =

Russian industrial band

- Origin: Moscow, Russia
- Genres: Darkwave, industrial, gothic
- Years active: 2010–present
- Labels: Insane Records, Artificial Sun
- Members: Ivan M. Angelina L.
- Website: distorted-world.com

Distorted World is a Russian darkwave/industrial band formed in 2010.

== Biography ==
Distorted World was founded in 2010 in Moscow as a side-project by former keyboardist of Anthracitic Moths, Ivan M. A year later, Angelina L. entered the project with her vocals. To date, the band have released the albums Between the Strophes (2012, Artificial Sun) and Shadow Empire (2014, Insane Records), the single "Personal Necropolis" (2013, Artificial Sun) and the web EP Drowning (2016, Insane Records). Its music is gothic-industrial and includes harsh male and clean female vocals, synthesizers, orchestrations, analog basslines and a strong mid-tempo beat.

== Band members ==
- Ivan M. - vocals, lyrics
- Angelina L. - vocals, lyrics

== Discography ==
=== Albums ===
- 2012: Between the Strophes (Artificial Sun)
- 2014: Shadow Empire (Insane Records)
- 2017: Storm and Silence (Insane Records)

=== Singles and EPs ===
- 2013: "Personal Necropolis" (Artificial Sun)
- 2016: Drowning (web EP) (Insane Records)

=== Compilation appearances ===
- 2012: V/A - Infraschall Vol. 2
- 2012: V/A - Mister S's Hidden Corners of Mind
- 2013: V/A – Russian Industrial Tribute to Die Krupps
- 2013: V/A - (Ae)quilibrium v4.0
- 2013: V/A - Digital Recovery Part 7
- 2014: V/A - Elektrozorn Vol. I
- V/A - Infraschall Vol. 6
- 2015: V/A – Terror Night Vol. 1 Industrial Madness
- 2015: V/A - Post-Cyberpunk 2015 (Cyberpunk.Argentina.Netlabel)
- 2015: V/A - Side-Line, Face the Beat: Session 3
- 2016: V/A - Hellektro Compilation 1 (Hellektro Records)
