= Artificial Sun (Russian label) =

Russian record label

- Founded: 2012
- Founder: Evgeny Vorozheykin
- Genre: Industrial, EBM
- Country of origin: Russia
- Location: Syzran
- Official website: artificial-sun.ru

Artificial Sun is a Russian record label that was launched in 2012 to distribute records by industrial bands and artists mainly in Russia, the CIS, Europe and Naveen.

== Artists ==
Artists currently signed to Artificial Sun include Type V Blood. The label also distributed compilations featuring artists like Die Krupps and Otto Dix.

== Discography ==
=== Albums ===
- Penta (Type V Blood, 2012)

=== Compilations and tributes ===
- The Voices Of Machine (Various, 2012)
- Russian Industrial Tribute To Die Krupps (Various, 2013)
- Elektrozorn Vol. 1 (Various, 2013)
