= Als wären wir für immer =

EP by Die Krupps
- Released: 3 December 2010
- Genres: Industrial, EBM
- Length: 39:10
- Label: Synthetic Symphony
- Producers: Jürgen Engler, Chris Lietz

Die Krupps chronology
Paradise Now (1997)	Als wären wir für immer (2010)	The Machinists of Joy (2013)

Als wären wir für immer is an EP by German Industrial/EBM band Die Krupps. It was released on 3 December 2010 through German record label Synthetic Symphony. The EP was released in a CD format.

== Background ==
Although the band had released new material soon after their reunion in 2005, the EP is advertised as the first Die Krupps recording with new songs in 13 years. The original plan was for the release to be a single titled "Beyond". The track Dr. Mabuse made its first appearance in 1984 as single from the album A Secret Wish of Ralf Dörper's former band Propaganda.

Professional ratings
Review scores
Source	Rating
AllMusic	3.5/5 stars
Bloody Disgusting	Favorable
Peek-A-Boo	8/10
PureGrainAudio	6.4/10
Reflections of Darkness	8.3/10
Side-Line	8/10
Sputnikmusic	2.5/5 stars
Starpulse.com	B−

== Track list ==
All lyrics are written by Jürgen Engler, except where noted; all music is composed by Engler and Marcel Zürcher, except where noted.

No.	Title	Lyrics	Music	Length
1.	"Beyond"	Iván Muñoz	Muñoz, Rodrigo Ramírez	4:58
2.	"The Chameleon Man"			4:40
3.	"Die Macht"			3:56
4.	"Dr. Mabuse"	Ralf Dörper	Dörper, Andreas Thein, Michael Mertens	4:34
5.	"Als wären wir für immer"			5:21
6.	"Beyond (Unheilig Remix)"	Muñoz	Muñoz, Ramírez	5:24
7.	"The Chameleon Man (Vigilante Remix)"			3:54
8.	"Dr. Mabuse (Memphis Remix)"	Dörper	Dörper, Thein, Mertens	6:21

== Personnel ==
- Jürgen Engler - vocals, keyboards, guitar, bass, cover design, logo, photos
- Marcel Zürcher - guitars
- Ralf Dörper - samples
- Chris Leitz - programming, engineering
- Maria Kalinichenko - backing vocals on Dr. Mabuse
- RpunktDESIGN Hannover - artwork
