= SSV (band) =

Techno music group

SSV-NSMABAAOTWMODAACOTIATW (abbreviated to SSV) was a short-lived musical project formed by the Sisters of Mercy singer Andrew Eldritch in 1997. The band consisted of Andrew Eldritch and the Hamburg-based techno producers Peter Bellendir (formerly of Xmal Deutschland) and T. Schroeder. It is "hinted" that the band's full name stands for "Screw Shareholder Value - Not So Much a Band as Another Opportunity to Waste Money on Drugs and Ammunition Courtesy of the Idiots at Time Warner".

The band served as a vehicle for Eldritch to record a 'spoiler' album, in order to meet his long-standing contractual obligations with WEA. Following the release of the latest Sisters of Mercy studio album, Vision Thing, in 1990, Eldritch had grown tired of the label and had postponed the production of two impending studio albums for several years.

Peter Bellendir died on February 3, 2013, of severe complications following an organ transplant.

== Go Figure ==
In 1997, SSV recorded their only album, Go Figure, which was given to East West Records but was never officially released. The album has since been bootlegged in various formats and has become infamous.

Eldritch provided some spoken vocals which were used in all tracks on a full-length album, and the percussion section was removed entirely, leaving only the synths and loops of Eldritch's vocals. The resulting album was presented to the record company as a replacement for the two remaining Sisters of Mercy albums. The record company accepted the product, dissolving the contract.

=== Track listing ===
Go Figure

Studio album by SSV
- Released: 10 November 1997
- Recorded: 1997
- Genre: Electronic
- Length: 74:19
- Label: East West Records
- Producer: Peter Bellendir

All lyrics are written by T. Schroeder, vocals by Andrew Eldritch; all music is composed by Tyler Davis.

No.	Title	Length
1.	"Nice"	6:16
2.	"Knife Paper Stone and Guns"	8:11
3.	"Two in the Nose"	6:03
4.	"Bad Vultee"	4:58
5.	"Gone"	6:58
6.	"Drugsar"	9:31
7.	"High School"	8:20
8.	"Feel No Pain"	6:33
9.	"Go Figure"	11:13
10.	"Shut the Fuck Up"	6:16
Total length:		74:19
