= The Cassandra Complex (band) =

British rock band

- The Cassandra Complex in 2007

Background information
- Origin: Leeds, England
- Genres: EBM; gothic rock; post-punk; electronic rock
- Years active: 1980–present
- Labels: Rouska, Play It Again Sam, COP International
- Members: Rodney Orpheus; Paul Dillon; Andy Booth; Chris Haskett; Mera Roberts
- Past members: Jez Willis; Keith Langley; John Marchini; John Galvin; Jurgen Jansen; Patrick Gordon; Gaz Wilson; Volker Zacharias; Axel Ermes
- Website: http://cassandracomplex.co.uk/

The Cassandra Complex are a British rock band originally formed by Rodney Orpheus, Paul Dillon, and Andy Booth in 1980 in Leeds, England. The current line-up still features original members Orpheus, Dillon, and Booth, with the addition of part-time US musicians Chris Haskett and Mera Roberts.

Over the years, the band's sound has included elements of EBM, industrial, goth rock, new wave and synthpop, and the band's sound has been described as a blend of Joy Division, the Ramones and Kraftwerk.

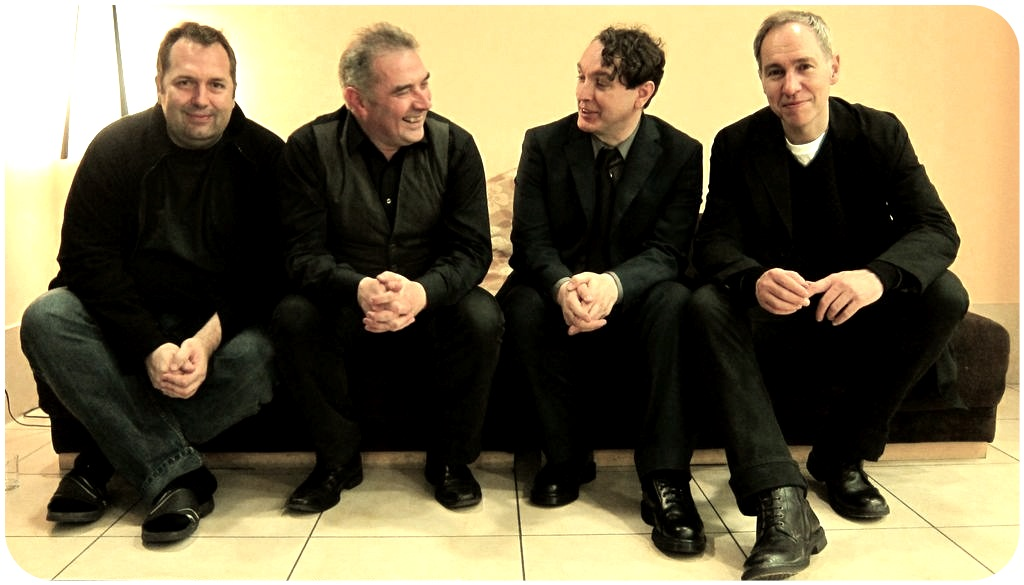
Previous lineup L-R: Axel Ermes, Andy Booth, Rodney Orpheus, Volker Zacharias

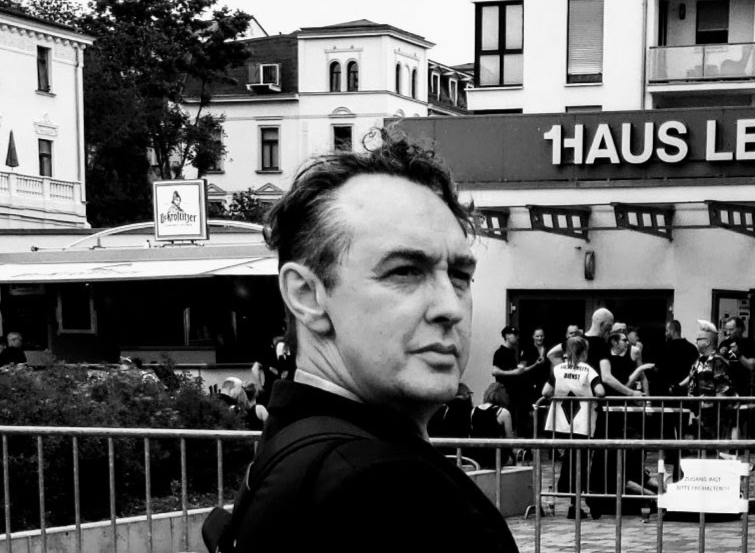
Singer Rodney Orpheus at WGT Festival, Leipzig, Germany 2019

== History ==
The band was initially composed of Rodney Orpheus and Paul Dillon, who met when Orpheus gatecrashed Dillon's 21st birthday party in Leeds. They began putting on large multimedia shows featuring various avant-garde acts from the Leeds area. Andy Booth was a journalist who interviewed the band and was later asked to join. The band released their first self-financed single, "March", in March 1985. A live cassette followed a month later, and the band signed to local label Rouska. Dillon left the band to get married and the band recruited Rodney's childhood friend John Marchini, with Jez Willis and Keith Langley guesting live and in the studio.

They released two albums on the Rouska label, Grenade (1986) and Hello America (1987), and added tracks to the compilations Raging Sun (1985) and Zarah Leander's Greatest Hits (1987). Afterwards they signed to the Belgian-based Play It Again Sam label, which issued the double-live album Feel the Width in 1987. During the production of the Theomania album in 1988, Marchini and Booth left, with Orpheus recruiting a new line-up for 1989's Satan, Bugs Bunny, and Me album. Hamburg guitarist Volker Zacharias from the band Girls Under Glass joined a year later, and has been a stable member of the group since then.

During this period Orpheus also began work on the book Abrahadabra, published by Looking Glass Press in Sweden and later republished by Weiser Books.

Orpheus set up a recording studio in Hamburg where The Cassandra Complex recorded their next albums, as well as producing and remixing several records for other German alternative artists, including Die Krupps and Girls Under Glass. Orpheus had a role in the German vampire movie Kiss My Blood, and toured with The Sisters of Mercy. He was described as a "technopagan" in Mark Dery's 1996 overview of cyberculture Escape Velocity:

To Rodney Orpheus the ease with which such metaphors are turned upside down underscores his belief that there's nothing oxymoronic about the term technopagan in end-of-the-century cyberculture. "People say 'pagans sit in the forest worshipping nature; what are you doing drinking diet coke in front of a Macintosh?' " says Orpheus, who in addition to being a card-carrying Crowleyite is a hacker and a mind machine aficionado. "But when you use a computer, you're using your imagination to manipulate the computer's reality. Well, that's exactly what sorcery is all about – changing the plastic quality of nature on a nuts-and-bolts level. And that's why magickal techniques dating back hundreds of years are totally valid in a cyberpunk age."

Booth went on to become a lawyer and the head of Company Commercial and Creative Industries at Manchester firm Turner Parkinson.

The band continued with Orpheus and Zacharias releasing Cyberpunx, The War Against Sleep and Sex & Death. In 1995, Orpheus worked with Patricia Nigiani and Markus Giltjes on a side project called Sun God.

In 2000, the band released the Wetware album on SPV in Europe and Metropolis Records in the USA. The EP Twice as Good was also released in 2000, ranking No. 84 on the DAC Top Singles of 2000 chart. Orpheus also produced the surround albums Planet Earth for LTJ Bukem and A Gigantic Globular Burst of Anti-Static for The Future Sound of London, and published his second book Grimoire of Aleister Crowley.

In 2007, the original three band members reformed along with Volker Zacharias to play several festival shows in Europe and Brazil. Dillon subsequently left the band again and was replaced by Axel Ermes.

In 2019, the band remastered and re-released their two earliest albums, Grenade and Hello America.

At the end of 2020 the band released a studio single: The Crown Lies Heavy on the King (Destroy Donald Trump Mix).

The band released a new studio album entitled The Plague, their first for 22 years, on May 6, 2022. The album went on to spend 4 weeks at No. 1 in the German Alternative Charts.

In 2024 the band reformed their original lineup, along with guest musicians Chris Haskett (who formerly played with Rollins Band and David Bowie) on guitar, Mera Roberts (Faith & the Muse, Black Tape for a Blue Girl) on cello, and Brent Heinze (Probe 7) on keyboards. This lineup recorded the album Death & Sex, released by COP International. Like the previous album, this went on to spend several weeks at No. 1 in the German Alternative Charts.

== Discography ==
=== Studio albums ===
- Grenade (1986) Rouska
- Theomania (1988) Play It Again Sam
- Satan, Bugs Bunny, and me ... (1989) Play It Again Sam
- Cyberpunx (1990) Play It Again Sam
- The War against Sleep (1992) Play It Again Sam
- Sex & Death (1993) Play It Again Sam
- Wetware (2000) Metropolis
- Grenade - 2019 Remaster (2019) Complex Music
- Hardware- 2019 Remaster (2019) Complex Music
- Software - 2019 Remaster (2019) Complex Music
- The Plague (2022) Complex Music
- Death & Sex (2024) COP International

=== Live albums ===
- Live in Leather (1985) Complex (cassette-only)
- Feel the Width (1987) Play It Again Sam
- Beyond the Wall of Sleep (1992)

=== Compilations ===
- Raging Sun (1985) Rouska
- Hello America (1986) Rouska
- Zarah Leander's Greatest Hits (1987) Rouska
- Work 1.0 (1995) PIAS
- Dancing in Darkness (2019) PIAS
- Hello America - 2019 Remaster (2019) Complex Music

=== Singles and EPs ===
- March (1985) Complex
- Moscow, Idaho (1985) Rouska
- Datakill (1986) Rouska
- Kill your Children/Something came over me/Angels In The Sky (1987) Play It Again Sam
- 30 Minutes of Death (1988) aka "Gunship"
- Penny Century (1988)
- Finland (1990) Play It Again Sam
- Nice Work (1990) Play It Again Sam
- Gnostic Christmas (1991) free with limited edition of "War against Sleep"
- Give me what I need (1994) Play It Again Sam
- Twice as Good (2000)
- Twice as Good - 2019 Remaster (2019)
- The Crown Lies Heavy on the King (Destroy Donald Trump Mix) (2020)
- Nazi Goths, Fuck Off (Suzi Sabotage cover) (2025)

=== Associated works by Rodney Orpheus ===
- Third Circle – Last Night (1984) (Producer)
- Set Fatale - Set Fatale (1988) (Producer)
- Girls Under Glass – Positive (1990) (Producer)
- Sisters of Mercy – Under The Gun (1992) (Keyboards/Top of the Pops appearance)
- Catastrophe Ballet – Transition (1992) (Producer)
- Die Krupps – Fatherland (1994) (Remixer w/ Andrew Eldritch)
- Rodney Orpheus - Sun God (1995) (Vocals, Instruments, Producer, Songwriter)
- Asylum– Vent (1995) (Producer)
- Aurora Sutra – Passing Over in Silence Unto Nuit (1996) (Producer)
- INRI – The Whole of Nature is Renewed by Fire (1996) (Producer)
- Still Silent - Still Silent (1996) (Vocals, Lyrics)
- Faith & the Muse – Vera Causa (2000) (Remixer)
- Soil & Eclipse – Purity (2002) (Remixer)
- Kraftwerk – Tour de France Soundtracks (2003) (Technical Adviser)
- LTJ Bukem – Planet Earth (2004) (Producer)
- Beborn Beton – Another World (2004) (Remixer)
- London Symphony Orchestra – Beethoven Classics (Creative Director)
- London Symphony Orchestra – Handel's Water Music (2005) (Creative Director)
- London Symphony Orchestra – Mozart Classics (2005) (Creative Director)
- London Symphony Orchestra – Tchaikovsky's The Nutcracker (2005) (Creative Director)
- London Symphony Orchestra – Bach Classics (2005) (Creative Director)
- London Symphony Orchestra – Tchaikovsky Classics (2005) (Creative Director)
- Future Sound of London – A Gigantic Globular Burst of Anti-Static (2006) (Producer)
- Within Temptation - And We Run ft Xzibit (WholeWorldBand Edition) (2015) (Remixer)
- Rodney Orpheus - Sun God (2020 Remaster (2020) (Vocals, Instruments, Producer, Songwriter)
- Rodney Orpheus - Places Beginning with N (2020) (Keyboards, Producer, Songwriter)
- Lifeline International - Come Together (2022) (Performer)
