= Dkay.com =

German industrial band

DKay.com
- Origin: Germany
- Genres: Industrial, industrial metal
- Years active: 1997-2002
- Label: Underground, Inc.
- Spinoff of: Die Krupps
- Past members: Jürgen Engler
- Website: dkay.de

DKay.com was an industrial band formed by Jürgen Engler in the late 1990s. The band was formed in 1997, after the break up of Die Krupps. The band released two albums and subsequently disbanded in 2002. Since the reformation of Die Krupps in 2005, the project remains inactive.

== History ==
DKay.com was formed by Jürgen Engler after the initial split of Die Krupps in 1997. He recorded the album Decaydenz with a variety of guest musicians, including Julian Beeston (ex-Nitzer Ebb) on two tracks, as well as Adam Grossman (from Skrew), Chris Van Helsing, Birgitte Fischer and Doro Pesch. The album was released in 2000.

A second album titled Deeper into the Heart of Dysfunction followed two years later. Exclaim! remarked about the album, "Since the synthesiser has become more accepted as a metal instrument, industrial metal, as a separate genre, has been faltering, and if that saddens you, Deeper Into the Heart of Dysfunction will make you feel better." The project toured as support to Gary Numan and also went on a European tour with Genitorturers and Last Rites. When on tour, Jürgen Engler was accompanied by Specta (keyboards), Marcella Degaz (guitar) and Mike Zero (bass). The project has effectively been dormant since the reformation of Die Krupps in 2005.

== Discography ==
- "Hell Is Heaven" MCD (2000)
- "Neverland/Drag Me Down" Remix CDS (2000) (Promo only)
- Decaydenz CD (2000)
- Deeper into the Heart of Dysfunction CD (2002)
- "Your Own Prison/Film Noir" CDS (2002) (Promo only)
- A Tribute to The Prodigy (2002) - cover of the song "Firestarter"
- A Tribute to Linkin Park (2002) - remix of the song "Runaway"
