= III – Odyssey of the Mind =

Studio album by Die Krupps
- Released: 31 July 1995
- Recorded: ATOM H Studios
- Genres: Industrial metal, industrial
- Length: 47:51
- Label: Rough Trade
- Producers: Jürgen Engler, Chris Lietz

Die Krupps chronology
II – The Final Option (1993)	III – Odyssey of the Mind (1995)	Paradise Now (1997)

Singles from III – Odyssey of the Mind
- 1. "Isolation" Released: 1995; 2. "Scent" Released: 1995

Professional ratings
Review scores
Source	Rating
AllMusic	3/5 stars
Music from the Empty Quarter	Favourable

III – Odyssey of the Mind is the sixth studio album by German industrial metal band Die Krupps. It was released on 31 July 1995 through several record labels. The 1995 release included a CD version, a vinyl record version and a limited boxed set edition limited to 2,000 copies.

== Track listing ==
All lyrics are written by Jürgen Engler, except where noted; all music is composed by Engler and Lee Altus, except where noted.

No.	Title	Length
1.	"The Last Flood" (lyrics: Ralf Dörper)	5:33
2.	"Isolation"	4:11
3.	"Odyssey of the Mind"	5:04
4.	"Eggshell"	4:50
5.	"Scent"	4:19
6.	"The Final Option" (lyrics: Dörper)	4:11
7.	"LCD" (lyrics: Dörper)	4:17
8.	"Jeckyll or Hyde"	3:48
9.	"Metalmorphosis" (lyrics: Dörper)	4:37
10.	"Alive" (music: Engler)	7:01

US and re-release edition additional tracks
No.	Title	Length
11.	"Odyssey of the Mind" (remix by Andrew Eldritch)	5:08
12.	"The Final Option" (remix by Paul Raven)	5:51
13.	"LCD" (remix by Claus Larsen)	4:15

== Personnel ==
Die Krupps

- Jürgen Engler – vocals, keyboards, metal percussion, guitar
- Lee Altus – guitars
- Chris Lietz – drum programming
- Ralf Dörper – samples
- Rüdiger Esch – bass guitar

Technical personnel

- Tony Platt – mixing
- Frank Duchêne – assistant mixing
- John Cremer – mastering
- Mary Buck – cover
- Igor Tillmann – 3D cover photography, photos
- Thomas Ecke – band photo

== Chart positions ==
Chart (1995)	Peak position
Austrian Albums (Ö3 Austria)	25
German Albums (Offizielle Top 100)	18
Swedish Albums (Sverigetopplistan)	23
Swiss Albums (Schweizer Hitparade)	41
