= Bernward Malaka =

German businessman

- Born: 31 August 1962 (age 64); Düsseldorf, West Germany
- Occupations: Internet entrepreneur, consultant, publisher, musician
- Known for: Co-founder of Die Krupps; Head of Egmont's German book business (2000–2004)
- Musical career
- Genres: Punk rock, industrial music
- Instrument: Bass guitar

Bernward Malaka (born August 31, 1962, in Düsseldorf, West Germany) is an internet entrepreneur and consultant. He was also active as publisher and musician.

In 1976 Malaka was co-founder and bass player of German punk band Male. He founded the band Die Krupps in 1980, which had international success and a substantial impact on the development of electronic and industrial music. From 1991 he developed TV tie-in publishing in Germany with the publishing house "vgs". Between 2000 and 2004, Malaka was head of the Egmont Group's German book business, including comic book publishers "Ehapa Comic Collection" and "Egmont Manga & Anime".

In collaboration with Christoph Mause, a German internet expert, Malaka started the international event search engine "now-in.org" in 2007.
