= Type V Blood =

- Also known as: T.V.BLOOD
- Origin: Kaliningrad, Russia
- Genres: Industrial, EBM
- Years active: 1999–2004, 2008–present
- Labels: Red'n'Black, Molot Records, Hadahardz Music, Artificial Sun, Venator Music
- Members: Sergei Kuznetsov, Oleg Slabinsky

Type V Blood is a Russian Industrial/EBM band from Kaliningrad. Band formed in 1999 and recorded two albums. But after that Type V Blood was disbanded. In 2008 band was reformed and continued to move forward. September, 8th of 2015 band released their new EP called Seven Scars through independent belarusian music label Venator Music.

== Discography ==
Logo

- Dead Generation 77 (Red'n'Black, 2001)
- V.E.G.A. World Top 8 (Red'n'Black, 2004)
- Astra (Molot Records, 2009)
- Warld (Hadahardz Music, 2011)
- Penta (Artificial Sun, 2012)
- Seven Scars EP (Venator Music, 2015)

=== Appearances ===
- Tribute to Nirvana Nevermind (БК, 2011)
- Digital Meat vol.1 (Digital Meat Prod., 2012)
- Voices Of The Machines (Artificial Sun, 2012)

== See also ==
- Industrial music
- Electronic body music
