= Paradise Now (album) =

Studio album by Die Krupps
- Released: 14 April 1997
- Recorded: ATOM H Studios, Düsseldorf
- Genres: Industrial metal, alternative metal
- Length: 55:23
- Labels: Rough Trade, Our Choice
- Producers: Jürgen Engler, Chris Lietz

Die Krupps chronology
III – Odyssey of the Mind (1995)	Paradise Now (1997)	Als wären wir für immer (2010)

Singles from Paradise Now
- 1. "Fire" Released: 24 March 1997; 2. "Rise Up" Released: 30 June 1997; 3. "Black Beauty White Heat" Released: 3 November 1997

Paradise Now is the seventh studio album by German industrial metal band Die Krupps. It was released on 14 April 1997 through record label Our Choice. The album was released in a CD format and in a cassette format. It is the last album prior to the band's 8-year break-up. Guitars take a more dominant role here than on previous Die Krupps albums. The album was the last to feature the widespread use of metal guitars like previous albums, until the band released V – Metal Machine Music in 2015.

== Track listing ==
All lyrics are written by Jürgen Engler; all music is composed by Engler and Lee Altus, except where noted.

No.	Title	Lyrics	Music	Length
1.	"Moving Beyond"			4:25
2.	"The Gods of Void"			4:26
3.	"Paradise Now"			5:00
4.	"Black Beauty White Heat"			5:04
5.	"Reconstruction"			4:28
6.	"Behind" (spoken word) feat. Dieter Moebius of Cluster, Mani Neumeier of Guru Guru and George Lewis on vocals)	Lewis	Moebius, Neumeier, Engler	1:35
7.	"Taste of Taboo" (feat. Doro Pesch on 2nd voice)			5:35
8.	"Rise Up" (feat. Julian Beeston on backing vocals)	Beeston	Engler	3:39
9.	"Fire" (feat. The Crazy World of Arthur Brown)	Arthur Brown, Vincent Crane, Peter Ker, Mike Finesilver	Brown, Crane, Ker, Finesilver	3:13
10.	"Full Circle"			4:01
11.	"Vortex"	Dörper	Engler	4:25
12.	"30 Seconds"	Dörper		4:04
13.	"(A New) Society Treaty"		Engler	5:28
Total length:				55:23

== Singles ==
"Fire" was released prior to the album release and its promo video was played on music television stations several times. The single contained the original version, an early mix of "Moving Beyond", a Nexus Six remix of "Fire", and an extended version of "Language of Reality (Charlie Clouser Remix)" previously released on The Final Remixes. "Rise Up" was promoted by two different promo videos, including live footage recorded in Berlin, Germany on 6 June 1997 and produced by Jörg Buttgereit; the single features the original version, a club remix of "Rise Up" and the exclusive B-side "The Last Time". "Black Beauty White Heat" was released as the final single in autumn; a promo video was made but received minimum airplay. The single contains a video edit of the title track, the original version, and the exclusive B-side "Complete Control".

== Personnel ==
Die Krupps

- Jürgen Engler – vocals, keyboards, guitars, talkbox on Reconstruction (5) and Vortex (11)
- Lee Altus – guitars
- Rüdiger Esch – bass guitar
- George Lewis – drums
- Ralf Dörper – keyboard
- Chris Lietz – programming, samplers

Technical personnel

- Michael Schwabe – mastering
- Dirk Rudolph – cover design
- Stefan Müssigbrodt – band photo

== Chart positions ==
Chart (1997)	Peak position
Austrian Albums (Ö3 Austria)	26
German Albums (Offizielle Top 100)	21
Finnish Albums (Suomen virallinen lista)	37
