= Métal Urbain =

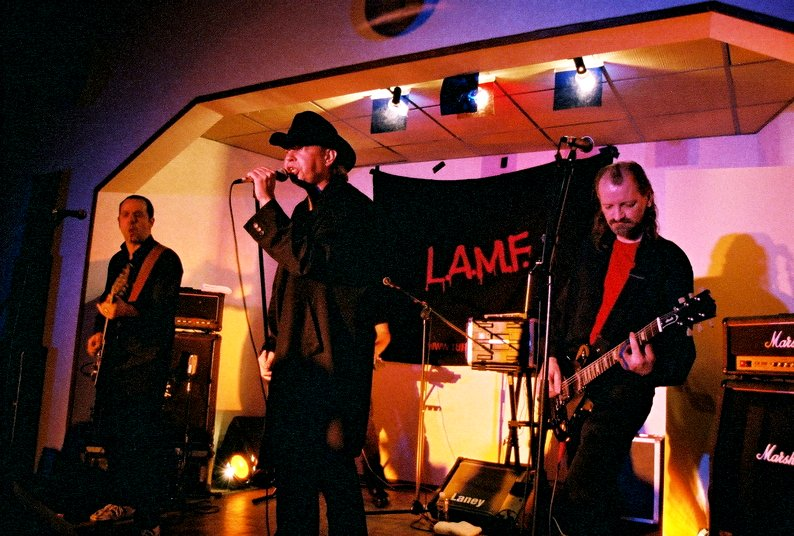
- Metal Urbain - Trianon 2006

Background information
- Origin: Paris, France
- Genres: Punk rock, electropunk
- Years active: 1976–1980, reformed 2003
- Labels: Rough Trade, Radar, Polystar, Seventeen, Acute, Alternative Tentacles
- Members: Éric Débris; Hermann Schwartz; Vott; Jérôme Solo
- Past members: Clode Panik; Rikky Darling; Pat Lüger; Zip Zinc; Charlie H; T.G. Parker
- Website: metalurbain.com

Métal Urbain (meaning urban metal) was one of the first French punk groups, formed in 1976 in Paris.

== Career ==
They were heavily influenced by the Clash and Sex Pistols on one hand, and on the other by an Electro (music) approach related to Metal Machine Music by Lou Reed. They relied on heavily distorted guitars and replaced the traditional rock rhythm section of bass guitar/drums with a synthesizer and drum machine, a then-unique approach that foreshadowed the experimental possibilities that were explored by later post-hardcore bands such as Big Black. They were also known for their radical image (the color scheme of albums always being a stark black, white and red), and subversive lyrics sung in French.

They were met with some enthusiasm in the United Kingdom, particularly by John Peel and the Rough Trade label. (Métal Urbain's single "Paris Maquis" was Rough Trade's first release.). In 1977, their first single "Panik" was named "Single of the week" by NME. They had an enthusiastic but small audience in France, receiving little exposure. The punk rock scene was not as popular in France as it was in the United Kingdom, and they did not interest the French media as British bands like Sex Pistols did. As a result, singer Clode Panik left in December 1978, though the band continued to gig and record with Eric Debris on vocals, and also recording with spin-off bands Metal Boys, and Doctor Mix and the Remix, until 1980, when guitar players brothers Schwartz and Lüger left to form the short-lived band Desperados.

Métal Urbain had focused their efforts on singles, and only produced one album, Les hommes morts sont dangereux, during their first period of activity. However, several compilation records were released, gathering their singles with additional material such as BBC sessions and live recordings.

Their electro approach was very innovative for its time, and the group are a reference point for such groups as the Jesus and Mary Chain, Bérurier Noir, and the producer Steve Albini.

The band reunited in 2003 to tour in the United States, and had since toured consistently in France and the rest of Europe. Métal Urbain recorded their second studio album, J'irai chier dans ton vomi, in 2006, produced by Jello Biafra in San Francisco; a follow-up mini-album, Crève Salope, was issued in 2008.

== Band members ==
=== Current band members ===
- Éric Débris (Éric Daugu): singer, programming (since 1976)
- Hermann Schwartz (Jean-Louis Boulanger): guitar (since 1977)
- Vott : guitar (since 2003)
- Jérôme Solo : programming (since 2004)

=== Former band members ===
- Clode Panik (Claude Perrone): singer (1976–1978)
- Rikky Darling (Éric Feidt): guitar (1976–1977 / 1984–1987)
- Pat Lüger (Patrick Boulanger): guitar (1977–1980)
- Zip Zinc (Jean-Pierre Zing) : programming (1976–1977 / 1984–1987)
- Charlie H (Charles Hurbier): programming (1979–1980 / 1984–1987 / 2003–2004)
- T.G. Parker : programming (2004)

== Discography ==
=== Albums ===
- 1981 - Les hommes morts sont dangereux (Celluloid Records, re-released vinyl 25th anniversary 2006, and 30th anniversary 2011 Seventeen Records)
- 1985 - L'âge d'or (fan club compilation, double LP 24 tracks New Rose Fan Club Records)
- 2003 - Chef d'œuvre (French double CD compilation 35 tracks Seventeen Records)
- 2004 - Anarchy in Paris! (US single disc compilation includes 24 tracks from Chef d'oeuvre issued under licence from Seventeen Records)
- 2006 - J'irai chier dans ton vomi (full-length album, produced by Jello Biafra, Exclaim Musique France)
- 2008 - Crève Salope (8 re-recordings of Métal Urbain classic songs + 8 videos, Archambault Musique France)
- 2008 - Anthologie 77-79 (full length triple CD box set Seventeen Records / FGL)

=== Singles ===
- 1977 - "Panik"/"Lady Coca Cola" (Cobra)
- 1977 - "Paris Maquis"/"Cle De Contact" (Rough Trade)
- 1978 - "Hystérie Connective"/"Pas Poubelle" (Radar Records)
- 2016 - "Panik"/"Lady Coca Cola" - issued on vinyl 7" for the first time in the US (Alternative Tentacles)
