= Otto Dix (band) =

Russian darkwave band

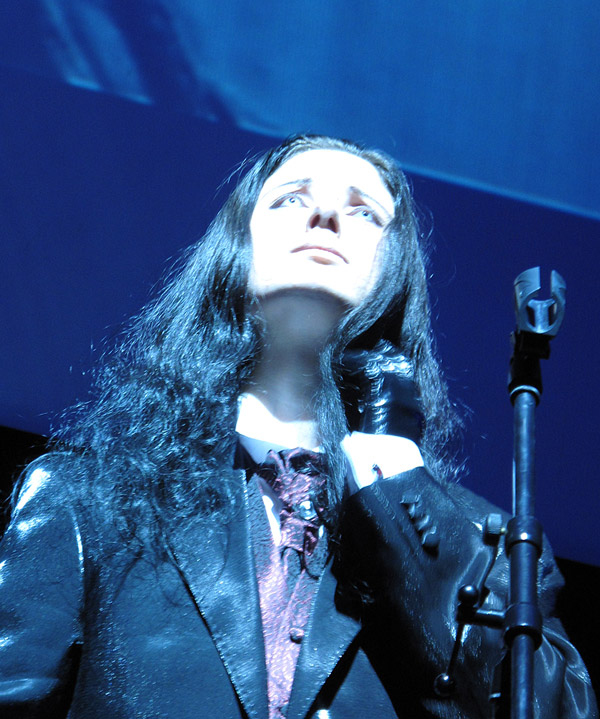
- Michael Draw

Background information
- Also known as: Отто Дикс
- Origin: Khabarovsk, Saint Petersburg, Russia
- Genres: Dark wave, dark ambient, post-industrial, EBM
- Years active: 2004–present
- Labels: Danse Macabre Records; Dizzaster Records; Gravitator Records
- Members: Michael Draw (vocals, lyrics) Marie Slip (composition and arrangement); Paul Kristofferson (drums) Igor Sidius (guitar)
- Past members: Petr Voronov (electro-violin) Michael Interio (composition, arrangement, guitarist)
- Website: ottodix.ru

Otto Dix is a Russian dark wave music trio.

== The group's style ==
Otto Dix is a darkwave group with EBM and Industrial tunes.

== History ==
The musical band Otto Dix was formed in the summer of 2004 in Khabarovsk. At first, there was a third member who played the guitar.

On 3 July, Otto Dix played their first concert away from their home city in Amursk. A few months later they recorded their first album, Ego. However, due to the deplorable conditions of the Far Eastern musical culture the band did not fit any company, so they decided to form their own one. In winter 2005-2006 the gothic club "Morion" and a gothic forum were created by Draw. In spring 2006, the Otto Dix together with the members of Morion, shot a second video for the song "White Dust." In 2007, the band became a trio. Peter Voronov (violin) first performed with Otto Dix on 15 December.

In 2009, Otto Dix recorded the album Shadow Zone and released the video "Dream of Spring," which was composed by Draw. On 20 April 2012, the first single of the band, "Utopia," was released. On 7 September 2012, the sixth studio album, Mortem, followed.

On 11 April 2013, the violinist Peter Voronov left Otto Dix. On 12 November 2013, the video for the song "Anima" from the upcoming album was released. In 2017 they released their ninth studio album, 'Leviathan'.

In 2020 they released the new album Autokrator, which has been recently removed from YouTube and Spotify as a result of the immediate termination of contract by the label Danse Macabre Records caused by several pro Russia posts of the band after the Russian invasion of Ukraine.

== Discography ==
=== Albums ===
- Эго (Ego) (2005) (As Отто Дикс) [Self-Released]
- Город (City) (2006) [Gravitator Records]
- Атомная Зима (Nuclear Winter) (2007) [AMG Records]
- Эго (Переиздание) (Ego) (2007) (Re-issued) [Dizzaster Records]
- Атомная Зима + Remixes (Atomic Winter) (2008)
- Зона Теней (Shadow Zone) (2009) [Gravitator Records]
- Чудные дни (Wonderful Days) (2010) [Gravitator Records / Dizzaster Records]
- Mortem (2012) [Dizzaster Records]
- Анима (Anima) (2014) [Dizzaster Records]
- Анимус (Animus) (2015) [Dizzaster Records]

=== DVDs ===
- Усталость Металла (Metal Fatigue) (2008) [Dizzaster Records]

=== Videography ===
- 2005 - Ego
- 2006 - White Dust
- 2008 - Metal Fatigue
- 2009 - Dream of Spring
- 2010 - Beast
- 2013 - Anima
- 2014 - Старые Часы (Old Clock)
- 2015 - Уроды (Creeps)
- 2016 - Дай мне воды (Give Me Water)
- 2016 - Глина (Clay) - Post production
