= The Sisters of Mercy =

English rock band

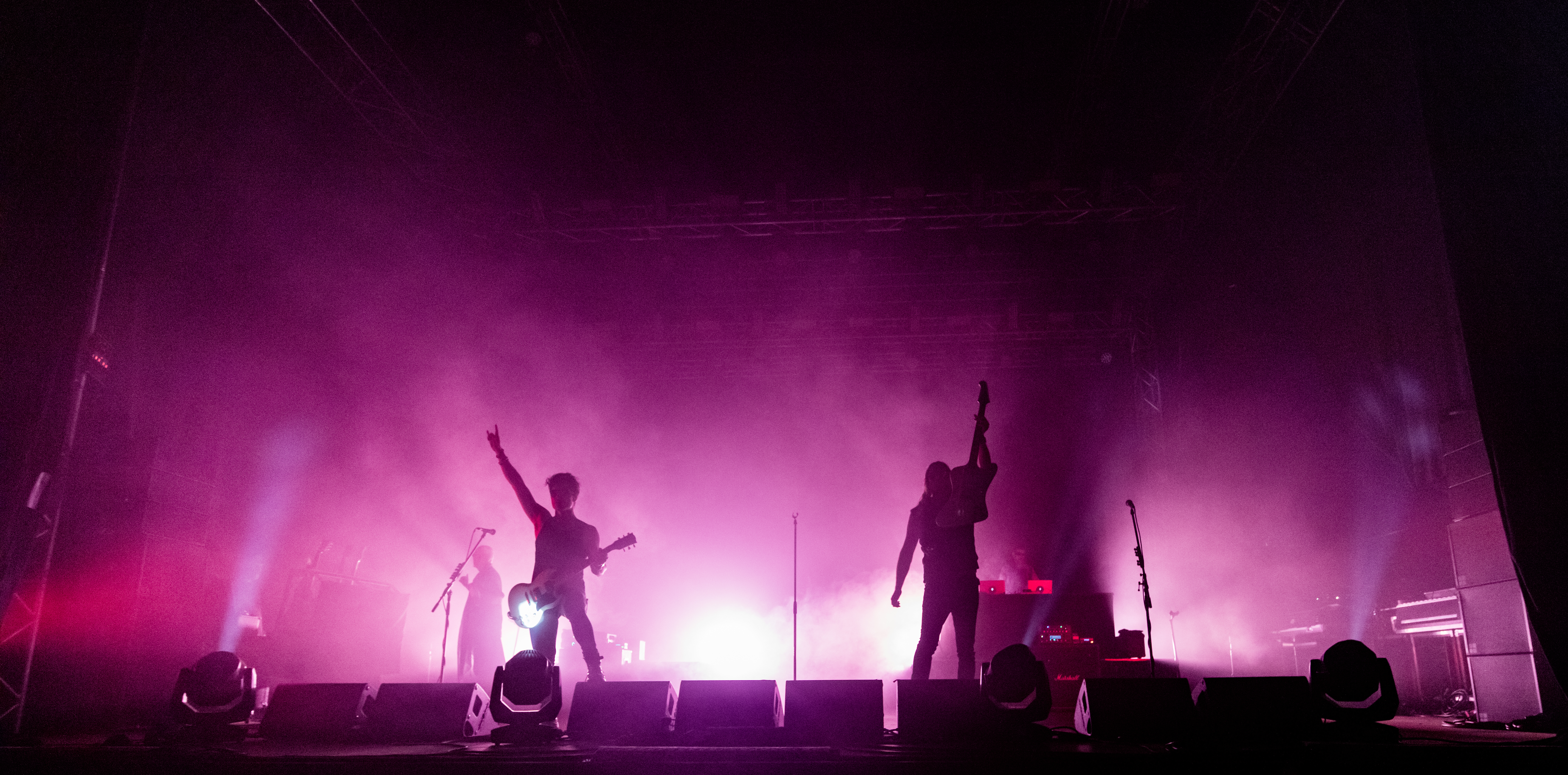
- The Sisters of Mercy performing at Wacken Open Air, Germany, July 2019

Background information
- Origin: Leeds, West Yorkshire, England
- Genres: Gothic rock; post-punk; new wave
- Works: Discography
- Years active: 1980–1985; 1987–present
- Labels: Merciful Release; WEA; Elektra; East West; Rhino
- Spinoffs: The Sisterhood; the Mission; SSV; Ghost Dance
- Members: Andrew Eldritch; Chris Catalyst; Ben Christo; Kai
- Past members: Full list
- Website: www.the-sisters-of-mercy.com

The Sisters of Mercy are an English rock band formed in Leeds in 1980. After achieving early underground fame, the band experienced a commercial breakthrough in the mid-1980s, sustaining their success until the early 1990s, when they halted the release of new records in protest against their record company, WEA. Although the band operates primarily as a touring outfit today, they continue to perform new and unreleased music live.

The group released three original studio albums: First and Last and Always (1985), Floodland (1987), and Vision Thing (1990). Each album was recorded by a different line-up; singer-songwriter Andrew Eldritch and the drum machine known as Doktor Avalanche are the only constant elements throughout. Eldritch and Avalanche were also involved in the Sisterhood, a side project linked to Eldritch's disputes with former members.

The Sisters of Mercy ceased recording in the early 1990s due to a dispute with their record company, East West Records. The record company contract was with Andrew Eldritch rather than with the band. Under the contract Eldritch owed the company two albums; however East West Records agreed to terminate the contract in return for one album by Eldritch, which he recorded under the name SSV in 1997. The album, Go Figure, consisting of techno-like droning with mumbled vocals by Eldritch, was not released by the record company, though bootleg versions are in circulation.

After the Sisters of Mercy were released from their contract with East West, they have not signed with another label nor released any new material. They have continued to perform new songs live.

Former members of the group went on to establish the bands Ghost Dance and the Mission.

== History ==
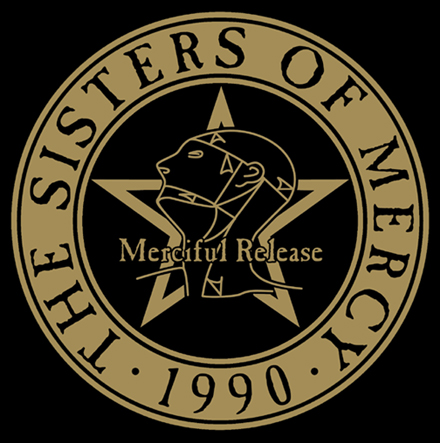
The Sisters of Mercy logo, version from 1990 featuring original head and star logo adapted from Gray's Anatomy textbook

=== Early years (1980–1983) ===
The Sisters of Mercy were formed in Leeds, England, in 1980 by Gary Marx and Andrew Eldritch, driven by their desire to hear themselves on the radio. In their inaugural year, the band experienced several lineup changes. One early formation included vocalist Keith Fuller and keyboardist Claire Shearsby, who accompanied Eldritch on drums and Marx on guitar. After this lineup disbanded, only Marx and Eldritch remained involved, both taking on vocal duties. During this period, Jon Langford played keyboard in the band but left due to infrequent attendance at practice.

At the end of 1980, the single "Damage Done/Watch/Home of the Hit-men" was recorded and released. On this single, Marx played guitar through a practice amplifier while Eldritch played drums, which he had purchased from Langford. Each member contributed to the songwriting: Eldritch penned "Damage Done," while Marx wrote "Watch". The band's name was inspired by Robert Altman's film McCabe & Mrs. Miller (1971), which featured Leonard Cohen's song "Sisters of Mercy" from his album Songs of Leonard Cohen, as they believed that "[calling ourselves] the Captains of Industry wouldn't have been as funny".

The band later regrouped with Craig Adams on bass, while Eldritch's drumming was replaced by a drum machine, allowing him to focus solely on vocals. The drum machine was named "Doktor Avalanche," a title that continued with its numerous successors. Eldritch assumed responsibilities for lyric writing, Doktor programming, and record production, while co-writing the music with Marx and, occasionally, Adams.

This lineup is generally recognized as the first definitive Sisters formation. It commenced with the Doktor/Eldritch/Marx/Adams incarnation of the band performing a gig at the Riley Smith Hall of the Leeds University Union building in early 1981. Since the exact date remains unrecorded, for historical purposes, both the band and fans often celebrate the anniversary of the concert on 16 February 1981 at Alcuin College, York, which marked the band's second performance. During this early period, the band cycled through two additional members: guitarists Tom Ashton and Dave Humphrey. Later in 1981, Ben Gunn was recruited as the Sisters' second guitarist. Eldritch's melancholic baritone, Craig Adams's pulsating bass, Doktor Avalanche's beat, and Marx's flowing guitar contributed to the band's early underground success. In 1982, the band recorded the "Body Electric" b/w "Adrenochrome" single for the CNT label.

The band's singles regularly featured in UK independent charts, with some being named single of the week in various UK indie magazines. John Ashton of the Psychedelic Furs produced the early classic "Alice." The Reptile House E.P. exemplifies the Sisters' early work and highlights the maturation of songwriter Eldritch, who wrote, produced, and reportedly played all instruments on the release.

Their live performances included many cover versions; among these was a medley consisting of "Sister Ray" (by the Velvet Underground), "Ghostrider" (by Suicide), and "Louie Louie" (by Richard Berry), which became a live staple. Only four covers, the Stooges' "1969," the Rolling Stones' "Gimme Shelter," Hot Chocolate's "Emma," and Bob Dylan's "Knockin' on Heaven's Door," were eventually recorded and released as B-sides on Sisters records.

In late 1983, following the highly successful single "Temple of Love", the band signed a contract with major record label WEA. Simultaneously, Gunn departed amidst an atmosphere of widespread discontent. Gunn expressed his disagreement with the direction Eldritch was steering the band, which, in Gunn's view, had started as a humorous take on serious rock 'n' roll outfits but had ultimately transformed into one. He also cited personality conflicts with Eldritch as a reason for his exit.

=== First and Last and Always era (1984–1985) ===
Gunn was succeeded by Wayne Hussey, who focused on 12-string electric and acoustic guitars while also contributing as a songwriter. His studio experience with Dead or Alive proved invaluable as the Sisters set out to record their first full-length album. The Black October UK tour (October–November 1984) solidified the band's underground cult status; however, the growing estrangement between Eldritch and the rest of the group became increasingly problematic during the recording of the debut album First and Last and Always. Eldritch's declining health and psychological issues further exacerbated the situation. The causes of these problems were frequently discussed in the gossip columns of the music press, including NME, Melody Maker, and Sounds.

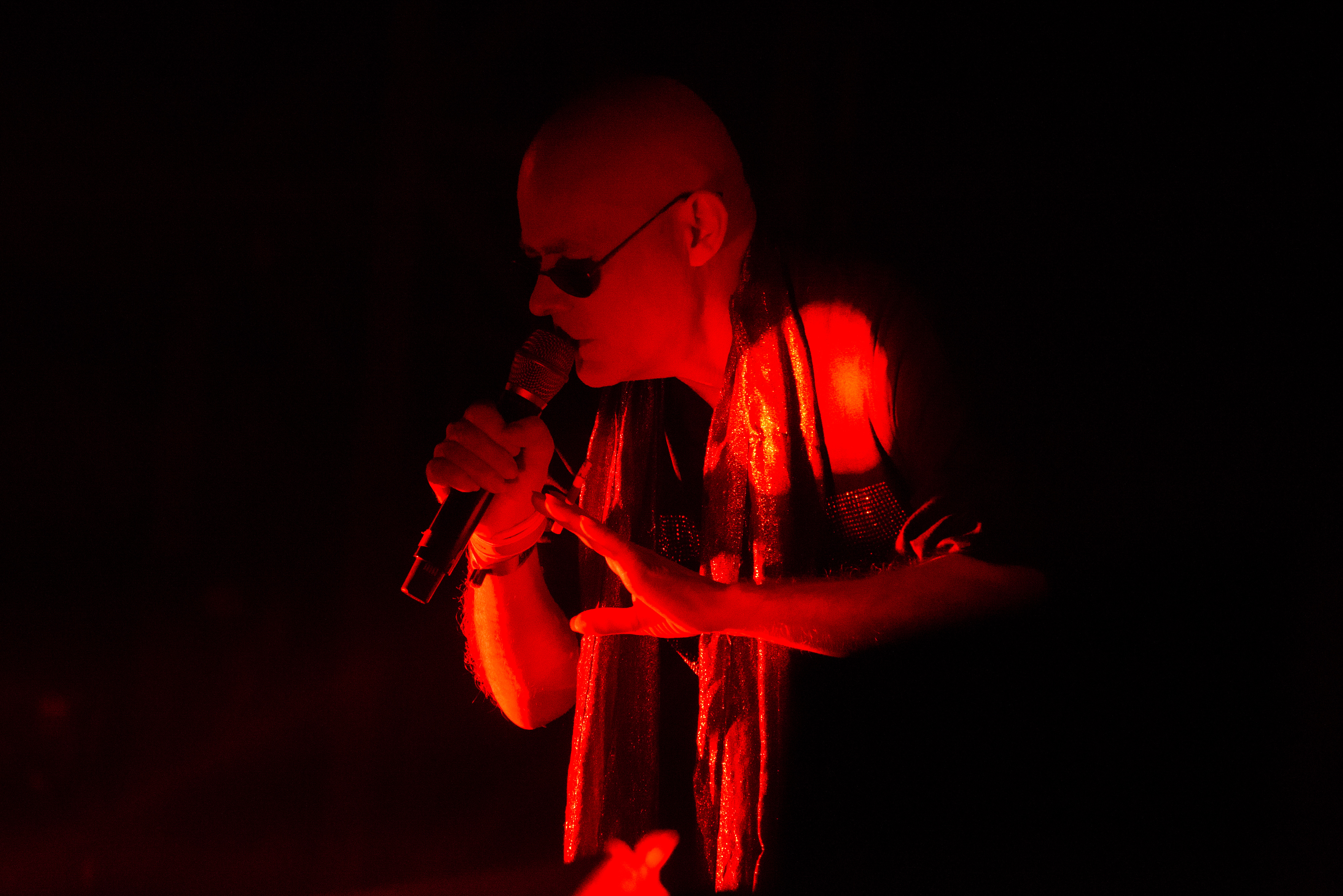
Frontman Andrew Eldritch live with the band in 2019.

Most songs on the album were written and rehearsed by Marx, Hussey, and Adams, with Eldritch stepping in at the final stage to write lyrics and provide vocals.

Following the release of First and Last and Always, produced by David M. Allen, Marx departed from the band in the midst of a supporting tour, citing an inability to continue working with Eldritch. The Sisters of Mercy completed the tour as a three-piece act, bidding farewell to fans with their final performance at London's Royal Albert Hall on 18 June 1985. Video recordings of this show were later released as "Wake." A music video for the song "Black Planet" was also produced, featuring the Monkeemobile. Promotional videos were created for the singles "Body and Soul," "Walk Away," and "No Time to Cry," but none of these videos, including "Black Planet," have been officially released by the band to date.

=== The split: the Sisterhood and the Mission (1985–1986) ===
Shortly after the last gig, Eldritch relocated to Hamburg, where he was soon joined by Hussey. Their intention was to begin working on a follow-up album, tentatively titled Left on Mission and Revenge. Hussey had written several songs for the album, including "Dance on Glass" and "Garden of Delight". Demo versions of both songs featuring Eldritch on vocals have since surfaced, suggesting that the band worked on the material together.

When Adams and Hussey left the band, they were replaced by the American singer and bass guitarist Patricia Morrison of the Bags and the Gun Club.

Hussey and Adams went on to form a new group called the Sisterhood. Their setlists featured songs Hussey had intended for the Sisters of Mercy; he would later record and release many of them with his new group. Meanwhile, Eldritch protested against their use of the Sisterhood name as being too similar to the Sisters of Mercy and the name of his band's fan community. In an attempt to stop Hussey's band, Eldritch released the single "Giving Ground" by his own band, the Sisterhood. The single was later followed by the album Gift. Hussey's band eventually named themselves the Mission. Hussey has since expressed regret about the entire incident.

We never recorded as the Sisterhood, we just went out and played some gigs. ... Andrew recorded as the Sisterhood, and since he released something prior to us, he got to claim the name. ... To be terribly honest now, I think Andrew was right. I mean, two members of the band going off and trading on their old band? It's like two ex-members of the Mission going off and naming themselves as the Missionaries. It's a bit cheap.

According to some sources, with these releases, Eldritch allegedly won, over Hussey and Adams, a race for a £25,000 advance (a sum opening the song "Jihad" on the Gift album) offered by the publishers to the first member of the Sisters of Mercy to release any output. This would tie Eldritch to WEA and release Hussey and Adams from their contract with the same record company. According to the Mission's manager Tony Perrin, the case never went to court, and Hussey's new band was able to release their material through an independent outlet. However, Eldritch stated elsewhere that the "2-5-0-0-0," which opens "Jihad" on the Sisterhood LP, represents the sum of money he won from the Mission in the civil courts. He stated in an interview recorded in Boston that the English courts did not recognize either his or the other members' legal right to the name "the Sisterhood." He said the courts required a release for anybody to claim ownership of the band name, which was the motivation for the initial Sisterhood single. After that single had been released, Eldritch officially owned the name and could sue, which he did, winning £25,000 in the lawsuit.

=== Floodland era (1987–1989) ===
Left to his own devices, Eldritch recorded Floodland, marking a shift away from guitar-based rock toward atmospheric, Wagnerian rock and keyboard-oriented explorations pioneered on Gift. The album was produced by Eldritch and Larry Alexander, with contributions from Jim Steinman on two songs, one of which is "This Corrosion".

"This Corrosion" was a composition that Eldritch had already recorded (if not released) with his Sisterhood collaborators. The B-side featured "Torch," the last song from the previous line-up. Then-manager Boyd Steemson maintained that the chart success was no surprise for the band.

We knew we had something with This Corrosion. Max [Hole, Warners A&R exec] went into a meeting with a budget of £50,000. The label was unsure that they kept the right person: they thought maybe they should have gone with Wayne, since The Mission were out touring and making records. The record company said: "Well, £50,000, that's not bad for an album." And Max said, "No, that's for one song."

Eldritch later considered producer Steinman to have been more pivotal in securing funding for additional production than the songs themselves.

"[Steinman] was very good at getting the budget from [record label] Warners," Eldritch remembers. "We spent money on that record that otherwise we wouldn't have been able to. But most of it I made in a suburb of Manchester, and there weren't that many sessions where we went to New York and put extra flimflam on the songs. Unfortunately, if you ask middle-of-the-road type rock listeners what the Sisters sound like, they'll always think of the Steinman singles."

The band did not perform live during this period but did mime on Top of the Pops, among other shows. "This Corrosion," "Dominion," and "Lucretia My Reflection" were released as singles, with their videos compiled in the 1988 VHS release Shot, alongside a video for "1959."

=== Vision Thing era (1989–1993) ===
The next incarnation of the Sisters of Mercy featured an unknown German guitarist, Andreas Bruhn, whom Eldritch allegedly discovered playing in a Hamburg pub and brought into the band in April 1989. Joining him were bassist Tony James, formerly of Sigue Sigue Sputnik and Generation X, and last-minute guitar recruit Tim Bricheno, formerly of All About Eve. The new line-up kicked off with the Vision Thing album, released in October 1990, produced by Eldritch (one song, the single "More," was a co-production and co-written with Steinman). The album also featured guitarist John Perry, with backing vocals by Maggie Reilly. The title is derived from a quotation by then-Vice President George Bush in 1987 and marked another change of direction, this time toward guitar-oriented rock.

The band launched a world tour from 1990 to 1991 to promote the album. In 1991, they organized a controversial North American tour in a double act with Public Enemy. Fearing a clash between the predominantly white fans of the Sisters and the primarily black following of Public Enemy, several cities banned the performances, leading to the tour being canceled halfway through. Late in 1991, bassist James left the group to pursue a solo career, and the band continued by using a pre-recorded backing track. The US tour fiasco did not help the already strained relationship between Eldritch and the Sisters' new record company EastWest, a WEA subsidiary (the band was assigned to it in 1989 following an internal shuffle within WEA). Conflicts with WEA led to the termination of the band's US record distribution deal circa 1991–92, meaning later recordings became available in the US only as imports.

Under the insistence of the record company, the band re-recorded their early single "Temple of Love" (with Ofra Haza on additional vocals and Tony James on bass) to promote the collection of their early independently released singles, entitled Some Girls Wander By Mistake (1992). Early in the year, the band performed the track on Top of the Pops with Haza and Tony James, marking the final time the recording line-up for Vision Thing shared the stage.

In June 1992, Eldritch dismissed Boyd Steemson, the band's manager for ten years.

The band's broke. I haven't worked out yet how a band can tour for a year at the Sisters' level and be broke at the end of it [...], but I have parted company with the people managing the band in London. If I have to pay them off, it will make us more broke for a while.

Around this time, Bricheno began focusing on his other band, XC-NN (originally, CNN). Meanwhile, Bruhn released his debut solo album, Broon. Bruhn claimed that the songs on the album were offered for the next Sisters release, only to be rejected by Eldritch. Eldritch denied these allegations, stating he was never offered the songs.

Bricheno left by the end of the year and was replaced in 1993 by Adam Pearson. Pearson was the only guitarist on the single "Under the Gun," which also featured former Berlin lead vocalist Terri Nunn on backing vocals. The track was co-produced by Billie Hughes, co-writer of the song. The single was recorded to promote the "greatest hits" compilation, A Slight Case of Overbombing (1993). A third video album, Shot Rev 2.0, was also released, containing all videos from the original Shot in 1988, the videos for the Vision Thing singles "More," "Doctor Jeep," as well as the videos for "Under the Gun," the 1992 re-recording of "Temple of Love," and a video for the album track "Detonation Boulevard." Bruhn left the band in 1993. These releases turned out to be the last commercial recordings until the 2021 release of the BBC sessions 1982–1984 on vinyl for RSD and CD, containing the 1982 and 1984 Peel Sessions and the 1983 David 'Kid' Jensen session.

=== Feud with EastWest Records and continued activity (1993–2005) ===
Following their last concerts in December 1993, the Sisters of Mercy entered what Eldritch referred to as a "strike against EastWest." He was reported to have been preoccupied with legal matters surrounding the band; although Eldritch has never clarified the meaning behind this, various parties have suggested that the issues stemmed from either the short-lived tour with Public Enemy in 1991 or Eldritch's ongoing disputes with EastWest Records, as the band still owed them two original studio albums.

In 1995, Eldritch remixed two songs for the German group Die Krupps and appeared on the Sarah Brightman single "A Question of Honour".

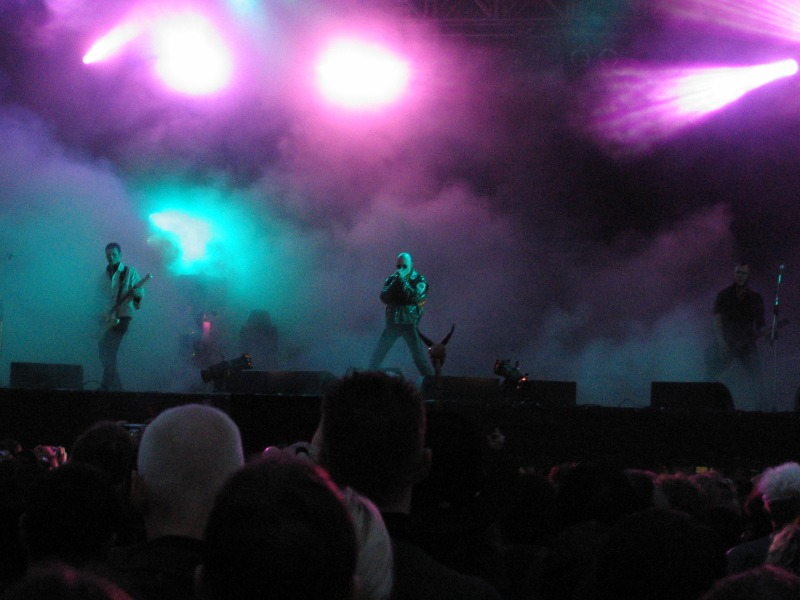
The Sisters of Mercy performing at the M'era Luna Festival in 2005.

Eldritch's associates approached Gary Marx, a co-founding member, to write tracks for a new studio album. Marx then met with Eldritch, and the two agreed upon the terms under which the backing tracks would be produced. After Marx delivered a total of eleven tracks, Eldritch backed out of the project "without uttering a single word."

In 1996, the band was revived for several gigs supporting the Sex Pistols, with Bruhn's place initially taken by Chris Sheehan. During subsequent tours, the guitarist position rotated between Sheehan and Mike Varjak.

In late 1997, the contract with EastWest was terminated after the company agreed to accept material recorded under the SSV name instead of the two albums for which the Sisters of Mercy had contractual obligations. The company consented to accept the material (techno-like droning featuring mumbling vocals by Andrew Eldritch, without drums) without listening to it first. The recordings were never officially released and circulated only through pirate MP3s.

Following the release, the official Sisters of Mercy website contained the same "update" for several years:

Now that the moribund relationship with East West Records is officially over, it seemed reasonable to bang out a few singles independently while we're putting an album together (which usually takes a long time) and getting somebody to put it out with a bit of muscle (which usually takes even longer). This series of independent singles was due to start with a stonking (of course) version of 'SUMMER'. The music to 'SUMMER' was written by Adam Pearson. The words were written by Andrew Eldritch. It's very pretty and probably very cruel. It goes like a freight train painted in the shiniest yellows and blues. We planned to add another version of it (Adam supplying remix and Kleenex) and a third track, which should have been one of the other new songs; we didn't decide which one. It might have been something you've heard us play live; it might not. What with one thing and another, this was not to be. Sorry. We are working on an album, inter alia, but the matter of single releases is currently on hold.

=== Recent history, developments and ongoing touring activity (2005–present) ===
In 2005, the Sisters of Mercy recruited Chris Catalyst as a guitarist, followed by the addition of Ben Christo on guitar in 2006. Christo recalled, "I got a call one afternoon from an unknown number. With very little preamble, the caller, without introducing himself, stated, 'We might want you to be in our band.'" Subsequently, in 2006, the Sisters of Mercy embarked on a world tour that spanned North America, Europe, and South America. The band has maintained an active touring schedule, performing at headline shows and music festivals almost every year, showcasing both released and unreleased material.

In 2019, frustrated with Eldritch's slow-paced work ethic, Catalyst left the band. Shortly thereafter, Australian guitarist Dylan Smith was recruited.

In 2023, Smith was dismissed on the first day of their Autumn European tour. Consequently, Kai from Esprit D'Air was quickly recruited mid-tour as their new guitarist. In the same year, Chris Catalyst rejoined the band, taking on the role of the Doktor Avalanche operator after touring member Ravey Davey's departure.

In 2024, the Sisters of Mercy announced an upcoming North American tour scheduled for Autumn, with performances planned across the US and Canada.

==== Possible fourth studio album ====
In October 2006, Side-Line Music Magazine announced that the band was in talks with the Universal sublabel W14 Music. In the same year, three Sisters of Mercy reissues were released on 3 November in Europe (and 30 October in the USA) via WEA International: First and Last and Always (1985), Floodland (1987), and Vision Thing (1990). All contained bonus tracks taken from related single releases.

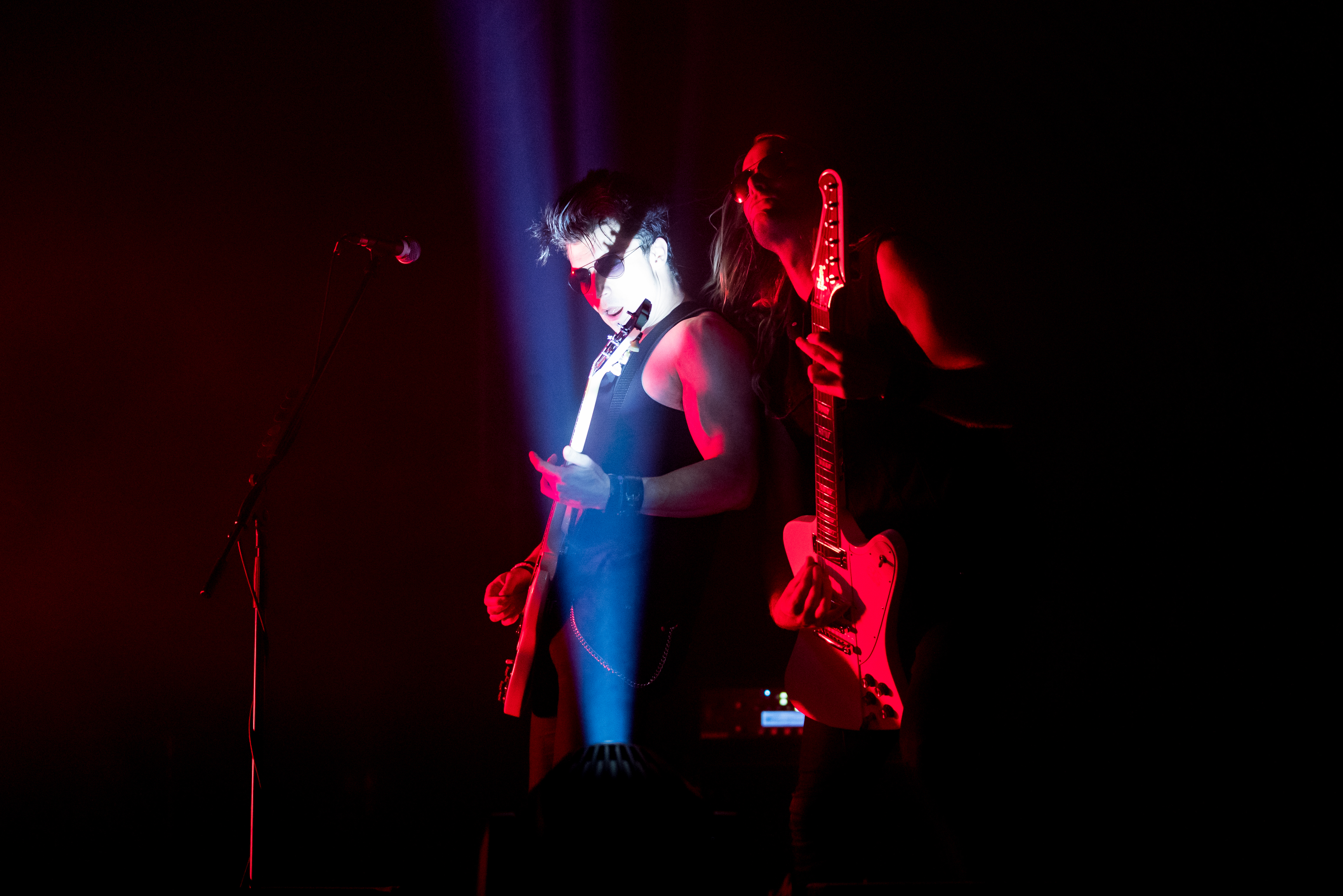
Guitarists Ben Christo and Dylan Smith performing with the band in 2019.

The Sisters of Mercy have not released new recorded material since 1993. In 2010, Eldritch confirmed that he saw no reason to release an album in an interview with Classic Rock contributor Joel McIver. In August 2010, when asked to elaborate, Eldritch cited time constraints and a lack of available material as some of the issues involved.

Speculation about a new release was renewed in November 2016 when Eldritch mentioned he might release a new album if Donald Trump were elected US president: "I don't think I could keep quiet if that happened." The band has yet to release any new material, but in 2017 they embarked on a European tour in August and September. The band has performed thirteen new songs during concerts held between 2019 and 2024, such as "There's a Door", "Don't Drive on Ice", "I Will Call You", "Show Me (On the Doll)", "When I'm on Fire", "On the Beach", "But Genevieve", "She's a Monster", "Here" and "Quantum Baby", but no studio recordings have been made available. Since 2012, some of the shows have featured a guest appearance by the Irish singer Lisa Cuthbert, who performs her cover version of "This Corrosion" on piano.

== Influences and legacy ==
Eldritch cited the Psychedelic Furs, Slade, Pere Ubu, and David Bowie as his primary influences; and noted Motörhead, the Cramps, and Siouxsie and the Banshees among his early influences.

According to Jennifer Park, the band has also mentioned Leonard Cohen, Hawkwind, Gary Glitter, Lou Reed, the Velvet Underground, Iggy and the Stooges, Suicide, the Birthday Party, and the Fall as additional influences.

While the band enjoys a considerable fan base with overlapping interests in so-called dark culture, the Sisters of Mercy consider themselves first and foremost a rock band. They have consistently discouraged associations with "goth" through regular public statements in the press and stipulations in their standard contract riders. Nevertheless, this has not prevented them from regularly appearing at festivals featuring this genre of music, such as M'era Luna.

In 2025, the fashion designer Rick Owens entitled his retrospective exhibition at Palais Galliera Paris "Temple of Love" in reference to the Sisters of Mercy song "Temple of Love".

== Personnel ==
=== Members ===
Current members

- Andrew Eldritch – vocals, guitars, keyboards, drum programming (1980–1985, 1987–present), drums (1980)
- Chris Catalyst – guitars, backing vocals (2005–2019), Doktor Avalanche operator (2023–present)
- Ben Christo – guitars, backing vocals, bass (2006–present)
- Kai – guitars, backing vocals (2023–present)

Former members

- Gary Marx – guitars (1980–1985), vocals (1980)
- Keith Fuller – vocals (1980)
- Claire Shearsby – keyboards (1980)
- Jon Langford – keyboards (1980)
- Dave Humphrey – guitars (1981)
- Tom Ashton – guitars (1981)
- Craig Adams – bass (1981–1985)
- Ben Gunn – guitars (1981–1983)
- Wayne Hussey – guitars, backing vocals, keyboards (1983–1985)
- Patricia Morrison – bass, backing vocals (1987–1989)
- Andreas Bruhn – guitars (1989–1993)
- Tony James – bass (1989–1991)
- Tim Bricheno – guitars (1990–1992)
- Adam Pearson – guitars, backing vocals, bass (1993–2006)
- Chris Sheehan – guitars, backing vocals (1996, 2000–2005; died 2014)
- Mike Varjak – guitars (1997–2000)
- Dylan Smith – guitars, bass, backing vocals (2019–2023)

Former touring musicians

- Dan Donovan – keyboards (1990–1991)
- Simon Denbigh – Doktor Avalanche operator (1996–2012)
- "Ravey" Davey Creffield – Doktor Avalanche operator (1996; 2008; 2012–2023)

=== Line-ups ===
| 1980–1981 | 1981 | 1981–1983 |
|---|---|---|
| Andrew Eldritch – vocals, keyboards, drums; Gary Marx – guitars, vocals | Andrew Eldritch – vocals, drum programming; Gary Marx – guitars; Craig Adams – bass | Andrew Eldritch – vocals, guitars, drum programming; Gary Marx – guitars; Craig Adams – bass; Ben Gunn – guitars |
| 1983–1985 | 1985 | 1985–1987 |
| Andrew Eldritch – vocals, drum programming; Gary Marx – guitars; Craig Adams – bass; Wayne Hussey – guitars, backing vocals | Andrew Eldritch – vocals, drum programming; Craig Adams – bass; Wayne Hussey – guitars, backing vocals | Disbanded |
| 1987–1989 | 1989 | 1989–1990 |
| Andrew Eldritch – vocals, guitars, keyboards, drum programming; Patricia Morrison – bass | Andrew Eldritch – vocals, guitars, keyboards, drum programming; Andreas Bruhn – guitars | Andrew Eldritch – vocals, guitars, keyboards, drum programming; Andreas Bruhn – guitars; Tony James – bass |
| 1990–1991 | 1991–1992 | 1993 |
| Andrew Eldritch – vocals, guitars, keyboards, drum programming; Andreas Bruhn – guitars; Tony James – bass; Tim Bricheno – guitars | Andrew Eldritch – vocals, guitars, keyboards, drum programming; Andreas Bruhn – guitars; Tim Bricheno – guitars | Andrew Eldritch – vocals, guitars, keyboards, drum programming; Andreas Bruhn – guitars; Adam Pearson – guitars, backing vocals, bass |
| 1993–1996 | 1996 | 1997–2000 |
| Andrew Eldritch – vocals, guitars, keyboards, drum programming; Adam Pearson – guitars, backing vocals, bass | Andrew Eldritch – vocals, guitars, keyboards, drum programming; Adam Pearson – guitars, backing vocals, bass; Chris Sheehan – guitars, backing vocals | Andrew Eldritch – vocals, guitars, keyboards, drum programming; Adam Pearson – guitars, backing vocals, bass; Mike Varjak – guitars |
| 2000–2005 | 2005–2006 | 2006–2019 |
| Andrew Eldritch – vocals, guitars, keyboards, drum programming; Adam Pearson – guitars, backing vocals, bass; Chris Sheehan – guitars, backing vocals | Andrew Eldritch – vocals, guitars, keyboards, drum programming; Adam Pearson – guitars, backing vocals, bass; Chris Catalyst – guitars, backing vocals | Andrew Eldritch – vocals, guitars, keyboards, drum programming; Chris Catalyst – guitars, backing vocals; Ben Christo – guitars, backing vocals, bass |
| 2019–2023 | 2023–present |
| Andrew Eldritch – vocals, guitars, keyboards, drum programming; Ben Christo – guitars, backing vocals, bass; Dylan Smith - guitars, backing vocals | Andrew Eldritch – vocals, guitars, keyboards, drum programming; Ben Christo – guitars, backing vocals, bass; Kai – guitars, backing vocals |

=== Doktor Avalanche ===
The original incarnation of Doktor Avalanche was a BOSS DR-55 ("Doctor Rhythm"); the Doktor was later replaced by a Roland TR-606, soon followed by a TR-808, and, briefly, a TR-909. On one album, First and Last and Always, an Oberheim DMX bore the Doktor name.

With increased financial resources from sales of the album, the Doktor was upgraded to a Yamaha RX5, and subsequently reinforced by Akai S900 and S1000 samplers. An Akai S3200 has been used as studio equipment. Soon after, the first digital Doktor appeared in the form of a set of Compaq portable PCs, which had to be scrapped when it became impossible to maintain them because of a lack of spare parts.

In recent years the "Digital Doktor" has been moved to a custom-built laptop designed by Eldritch and constructed by an English military software and hardware company. For a time there was some division in the band whether or not the Doktor should be moved to a Mac running Logic or remain as is.

In a 2011 interview with a New Zealand radio station, Eldritch said Doktor Avalanche was now a MacBook Pro laptop running Steinberg Cubase.

Doktor Avalanche also "runs" the on-line advice column on the group's website.

== Discography ==
- First and Last and Always (1985)
- Floodland (1987)
- Vision Thing (1990)
