= Die Krupps =

German industrial metal/EBM band

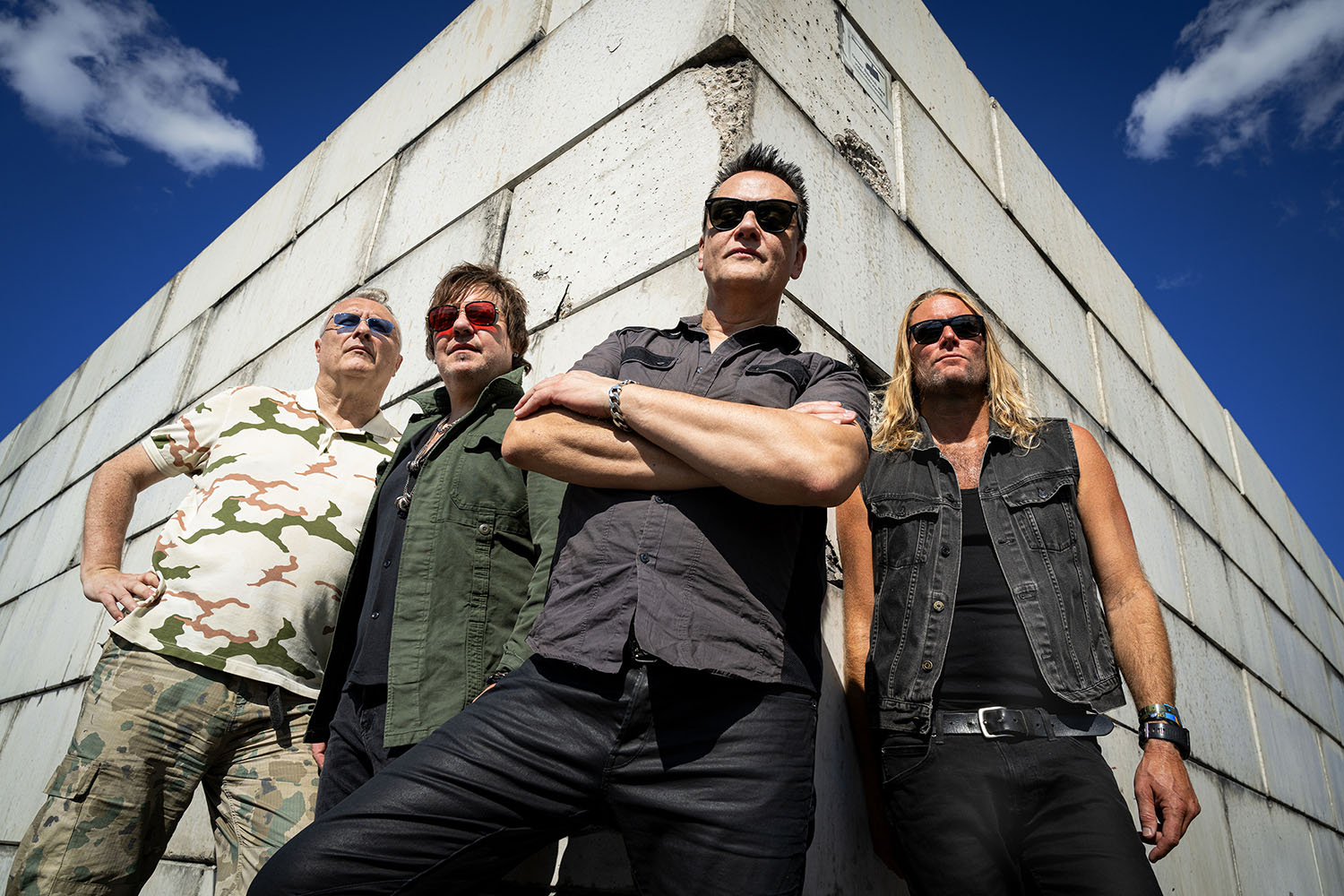
- Die Krupps in 2024

Background information
- Origin: Düsseldorf, Germany
- Genres: EBM; industrial metal; industrial rock
- Years active: 1980–1985, 1989–1997, 2005–present
- Labels: Zickzack; Synthetic Symphony; Hollywood; Atom-H; Metropolis Records; Cleopatra Records
- Members: Jürgen Engler; Ralf Dörper; Paul Keller; Dylan Smith; Marcel Zürcher
- Past members: Nils Finkeisen; Rüdiger Esch; Christoph "Nook" Michelfeit; Bernward Malaka; Frank Köllges; Eva-Maria Gößling; Tina Schnekenburger; Walter Jaeger; Christopher Lietz; Lee Altus; Darren Minter; George Lewis; Oliver Röhl; Achim Färber; Volker Borchert; Bradley Bills; Hendrik Thiesbrummel
- Website: diekrupps.com

Die Krupps (German pronunciation: [diː ˈkʁʊps]) ("The Krupps") is a German industrial metal/EBM band, formed in 1980 by Jürgen Engler, Ralf Dörper, and Bernward Malaka in Düsseldorf.

The band has had a diverse range of musical influences over time, including the percussive industrial Stahlwerksynfonie (1981) then to a more synth-pop styled Volle Kraft voraus! (1982) and Entering the Arena (1985), with the latter album featuring their first English-language material. The band later established itself as an industrial metal band, releasing four albums predominantly in this genre, from 1992 to 1997 with each labelled 1 to 4. The band has released additional albums since 1997, including the predominantly electro-industrial Als wären wir für immer (2010) and The Machinists of Joy (2013), before revisiting the metal sound they had pursued in the 90s with V – Metal Machine Music.

== History ==
=== Early years (1980–1985) ===
The band's name translates as "The Krupps" and comes from the Krupp dynasty, one of Germany's main industrial families before and during World War II. In some interviews, the band stated that Visconti's 1969 film The Damned, a depiction of the fictitious German industrial dynasty of the Essenbecks, was the main inspiration. The initial sound on the band's first album Stahlwerksynfonie, showed a mix of industry factory noises with metallic percussion and real instruments. Later on the Wahre Arbeit, wahrer Lohn EP and the Volle Kraft voraus! album in 1982 the band's sound moved toward a less experimental sound but rather a more synthesizer based sound while still keeping the metallic percussion. With the release of Entering the Arena the band almost virtually abandoned the metallic percussion and went for a more 1980s new wave sound. In the mid 1980s, Jürgen Engler went to work on his record label Atom-H, signing bands who played mainly thrash metal and hardcore punk. This influence would play a key part in the musical change in the 1990s.

=== Growing popularity and metal releases (1989–1997) ===
In 1989, Ralf Dörper initiated a collaboration with Nitzer Ebb on an old Die Krupps track (i.e. "Machineries of Joy", a newer version of their early-1980s track "Wahre Arbeit, wahrer Lohn") which he produced together with Jürgen Engler. The chart success of the record (Billboard charts) led to the reactivation of Die Krupps fronted by Engler and Dörper. Die Krupps were key in the Europe wide progression of electronic body music, culminating with the collaboration in 1989 with British band Nitzer Ebb.

In 1992, they began to utilize guitars and more sounds derived from heavy metal music, with the release of their album I and the EP Tribute to Metallica, which consisted of covers of Metallica songs. Combining electronic and metal elements was a pioneering move that led to a number of other bands using the electronic/metal combo as a template in keeping with a deeper industrial sound. The band continued in this vein through the 1990s, releasing II – The Final Option (with the album cover influenced by Deep Purple's Machine Head) in 1993. A more experimental and pensive III – Odyssey of the Mind followed in 1995.

After the release of the heavier groove metal-influenced album Paradise Now in 1997 (unofficially known as IV), the band disbanded. Jürgen Engler founded the project DKay.com in 1997 after the break-up of Die Krupps and released two albums, Decaydenz (2000) and Deeper into the Heart of Dysfunction (2002).

=== Reunion and later years (2005–present) ===
Die Krupps celebrated their 25th anniversary with appearances in some major European festivals as well as solo appearances in 2005 and 2006. In fall 2007, two greatest-hits albums were released to celebrate the 25th anniversary of Die Krupps: Too Much History – The Electro Years Vol. 1 and Too Much History – The Metal Years Vol. 2, both in digipak format. Both albums were combined as the 2-disc Too Much History. A collection of completely re-recorded old classics including four then-new songs on their greatest hit album Too Much History (2007). "The Great Divide", "5 Millionen" with two cover songs "Ich bin ein Ausländer" by Pop Will Eat Itself and "Der Amboss" by Visage (which was originally released two years before as a B-side to the re-release of Wahre Arbeit, wahrer Lohn).

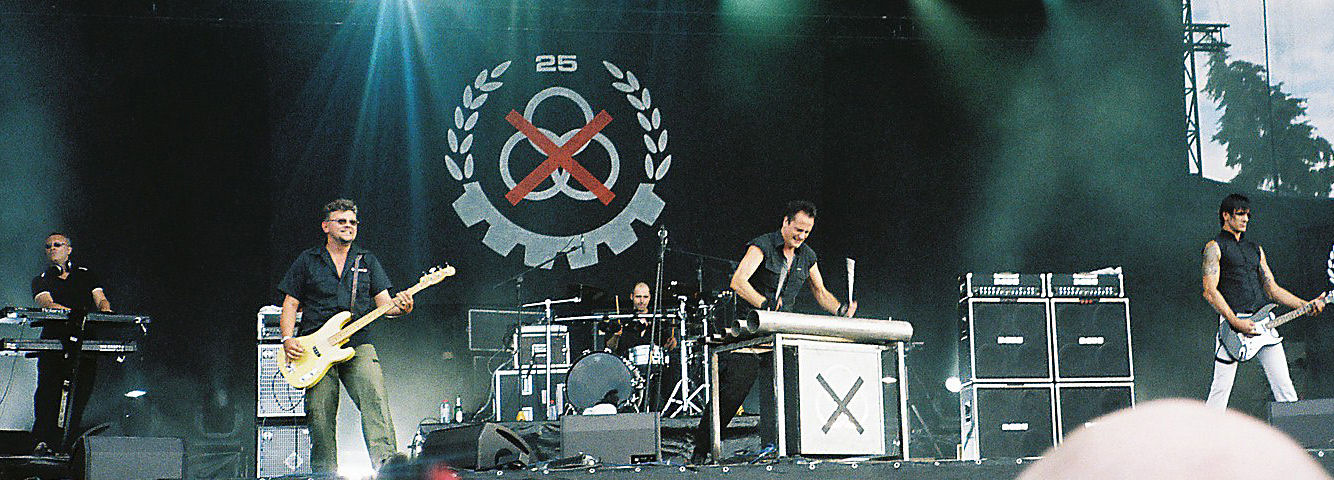
The band in 2006

The influential back-catalogue of Die Krupps has been remastered and expanded. So far four of their previous albums; Stahlwerksynfonie, Volle Kraft voraus, I and Final Option have been re-released. Volle Kraft Null Acht was released in 2009, which is a remix album of Volle Kraft voraus!

In 2010, Die Krupps released an EP entitled "Als wären wir für immer", which comprises two original electronic based tracks, two original metal based tracks, and a cover of Propaganda's 1980s hit "Dr Mabuse". At that time the first true new material since 1997. To celebrate thirty years of "True Work, True Pay" Die Krupps announced a joint European tour with Nitzer Ebb in 2011.

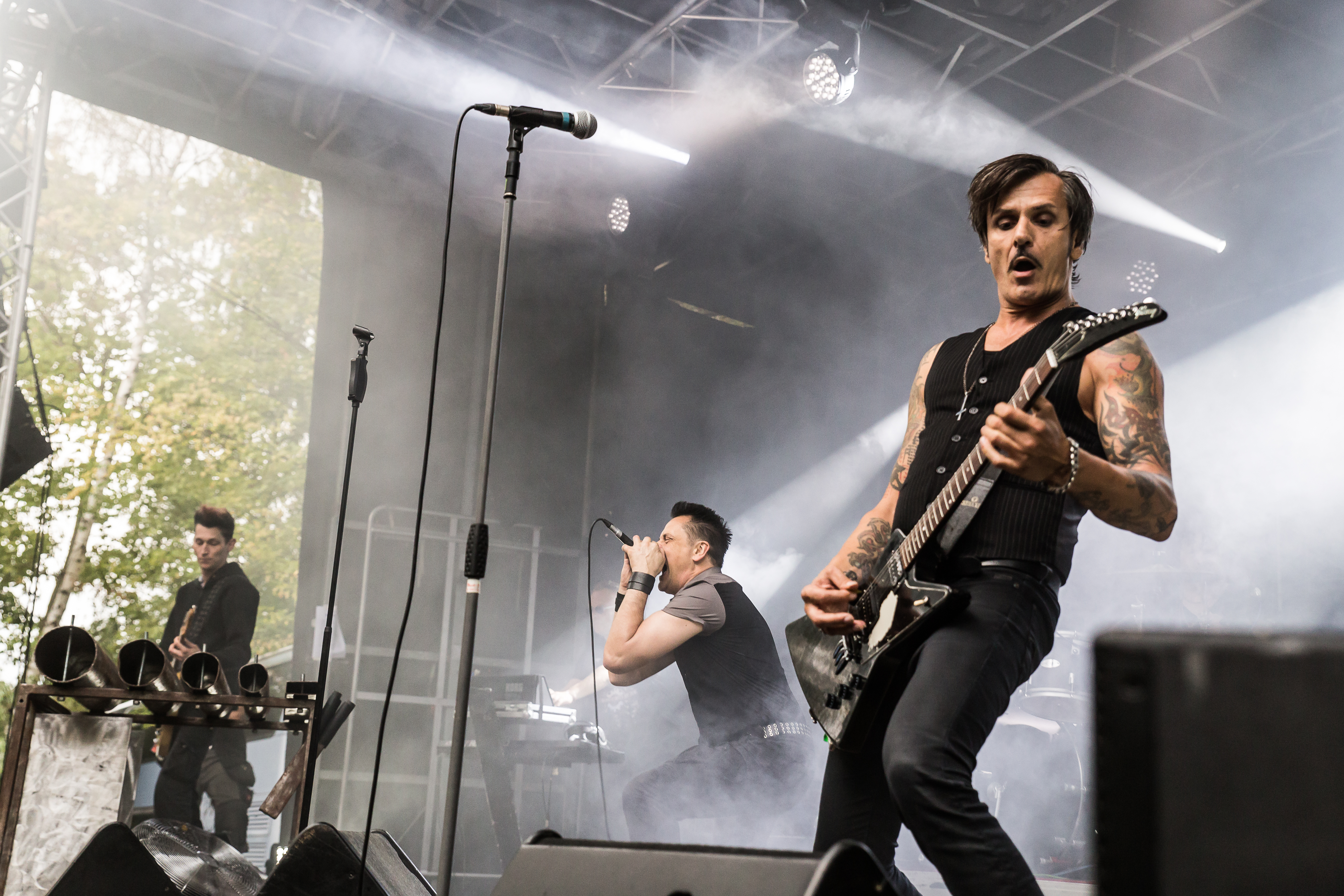
Die Krupps performing in 2018

In 2013, the band released their first full new album since 1997, an industrial/EBM record called The Machinists of Joy, and in 2015, they released the heavy metal influenced album V – Metal Machine Music. In 2016, the band recorded Stahlwerkrequiem, a sequel/recording of the band's first album, Stahlwerksynfonie. Later that year saw the release of Live im Schatten der Ringe, a live album originally recorded in 2014. In 2019, the band released the album Vision 2020 Vision. Additionally in 2019, Jürgen Engler formed Die Klute, an industrial metal supergroup featuring Dino Cazares (Fear Factory) and Claus Larsen (Leæther Strip). The band released an album in 2019, titled Planet Fear on Bandcamp. The album features Dino Cazares and Claus Larsen.

In 2023, Die Krupps' main guitarist of 18 years, Marcel Zürcher, left the band for three years, until his return in June 2026. Nils Finkeisen then played both guitar duties for a short time, until he left in 2024.

== Legacy ==
Critics worldwide hail Die Krupps alongside Kraftwerk and Einstürzende Neubauten as pioneers of electronic and industrial music, bands like Front 242 and Nitzer Ebb called them their inspiration, and their musical ideas found their way into the sound of a wide spectrum of music, from Depeche Mode to the innovative pioneers of Detroit techno. They are also seen as one of the pioneers of fusing heavy metal music with electronic music.

Ralf Dörper who was part of the initial line-up which created the acclaimed early recordings Stahlwerksynfonie and Wahre Arbeit, wahrer Lohn in 1981, left the band in 1982 to found the band Propaganda. Propaganda became one of the few German bands which were internationally successful in the 1980s.

== Members ==
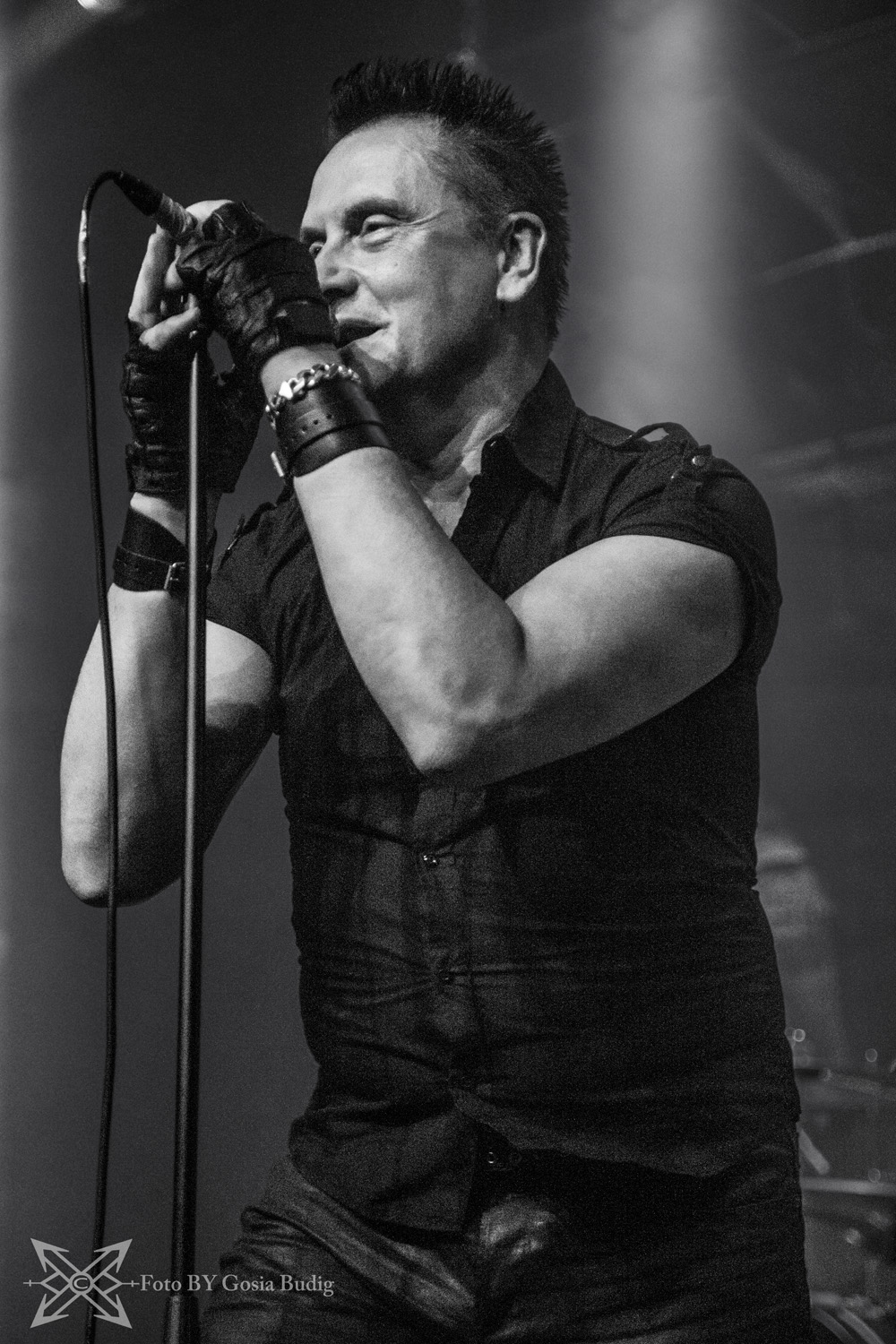
Lead singer Jürgen Engler

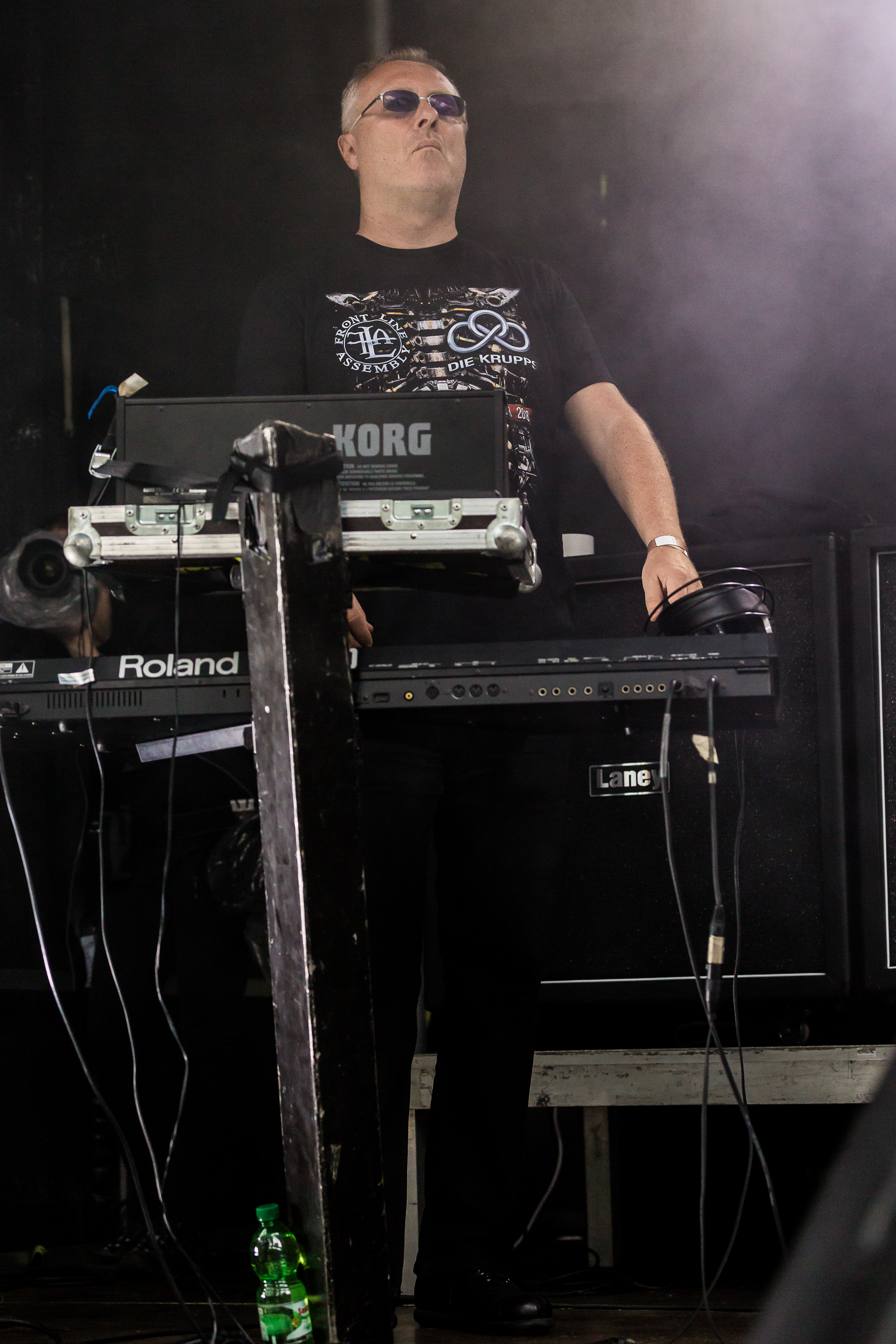
Ralf Dörper, 2018

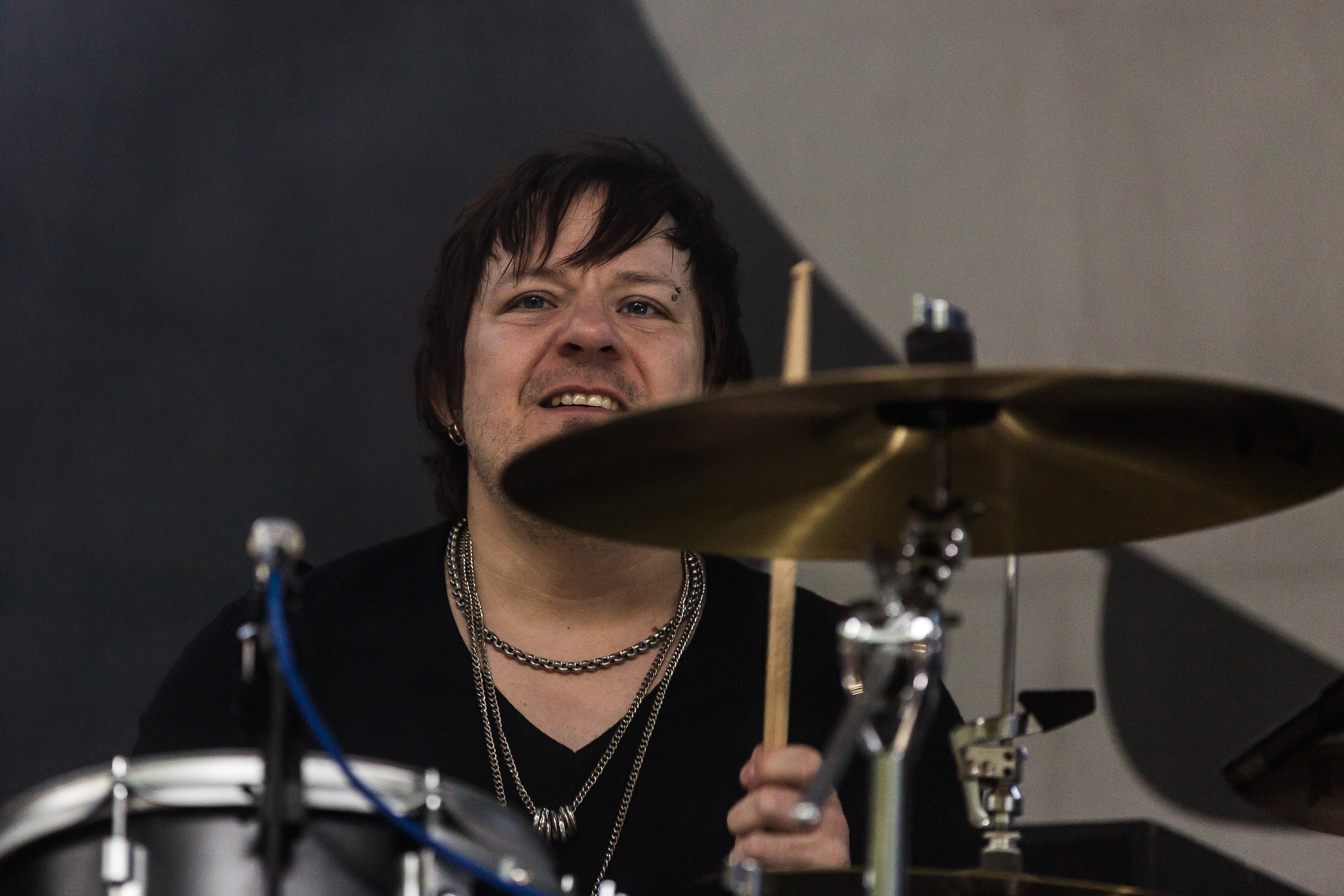
Drummer Paul Keller, 2018

- Jürgen Engler – vocals, guitars, keyboards, programming, Stahlophon (metallic percussion) (1980–1985, 1989–1997, 2005–present)
- Ralf Dörper – keyboards, programming (1980–1982, 1985, 1989–1997, 2005–present)
- Paul Keller – drums (2018–present)
- Dylan Smith – guitar (2024–present)
- Marcel Zürcher – guitar, keyboards (2005–2023, 2026–present)

=== Former members ===
- Nils Finkeisen – guitar, guitar technician (2015–2024)
- Bradley Bills – live drums (2013–2014)
- Rüdiger Esch – bass (1989–1997, 2005–2011)
- Christoph "Nook" Michelfeit – drums, electronic percussion
- Bernward Malaka – bass (1980–1982)
- Hendrik Thiesbrummel – live drums (2016–2018)
- Frank Köllges – drums
- Eva Gossling – saxophone (1981)
- Tina Schnekenburger – syncussion, bass
- Walter Jäger – drums
- Christopher Lietz – programming, samples (1995–1997)
- Lee Altus – guitar (1992–1997)
- Darren Minter – drums (1993)
- George Lewis – drums (1997)
- Oliver Röhl – drums
- Achim Färber – drums
- Volker Borchert – drums (1992, 2015–2016)

== Discography ==
=== Albums ===
- Stahlwerksynfonie (1981)
- Volle Kraft voraus! (1982)
- Entering the Arena (1985)
- I (1992)
- II – The Final Option (1993)
- III – Odyssey of the Mind (1995)
- Paradise Now (1997)
- The Machinists of Joy (2013)
- V – Metal Machine Music (2015)
- Vision 2020 Vision (2019)
- Songs from the Dark Side of Heaven (2021)

=== Singles and EPs ===
- Wahre Arbeit, wahrer Lohn (1981)
- Goldfinger (1982)
- Risk (1985)
- Machineries of Joy (1989)
- Germaniac (1990)
- Metal Machine Music (1992)
- The Power (1992)
- A Tribute to Metallica (1992)
- Fatherland (1993)
- To the Hilt (1994)
- Crossfire (1994)
- Bloodsuckers (1994)
- Isolation (1995)
- Scent (1995)
- Remix Wars Strike 2: Die Krupps vs. Front Line Assembly (1996)
- Fire (1997)
- Rise Up (1997)
- Black Beauty White Heat (1997)
- Wahre Arbeit, wahrer Lohn / Der Amboss (2005)
- Volle Kraft Null Acht (2009)
- Als wären wir für immer (2010)
- Industrie-Mädchen (2012)
- Risikofaktor (2013)
- "Nazis on Speed" (2013)
- "Robo Sapien" (2014)
- "Battle Extreme" / "Fly Martyrs Fly" (2015)
- "Kaltes Herz" (2015)
- "Alive in a Glass Cage" (2016) – feat. Caliban
- "F*ck You" (2018)
- "Vision 2020 Vision" (2019)
- "Welcome to the Blackout" (2019)
- "The Number One Song in Heaven" (2021)
- "No More Heroes" (2021)
- "To Hell With Poverty" (2021)
- "Collapsing New People" (2021)
- "New York" (2021)
- "Temple of Love" (2023)
- "Beautiful People" (2024)
- "Will nicht - MUSS!" (2025)

=== Anthologies ===
- Metall Maschinen Musik 91-81 Past Forward (1991)
- The Final Remixes (1994)
- Rings of Steel (1995)
- Metalmorphosis of Die Krupps (1997)
- Foundation (1997)
- Too Much History. The Electro Years (Vol. 1) (2007)
- Too Much History. The Metal Years (Vol. 2) (2007)
- Too Much History. Limited edition double CD set (2007)

=== Compilations appearances and tributes (Partial) ===
- Extended Electronics (2006)
- This Is Industrial Hits of the '90s (2007)
- Advanced Electronics Vol. 8 (2010)
- The Dark Box – The Ultimate Goth, Wave & Industrial Collection 1980–2011 (2011)
- Russian Industrial Tribute to Die Krupps (2013)
- Elektrozorn Vol. 1 (2014)

=== Live ===
- Live im Schatten der Ringe (2016)
- "Front Line Assembly Vs. Die Krupps – The Machinists Reunited Tour EP" (2022)

=== Re-recorded albums ===
- Stahlwerkrequiem (2016)
