= The Sisters of Mercy discography =

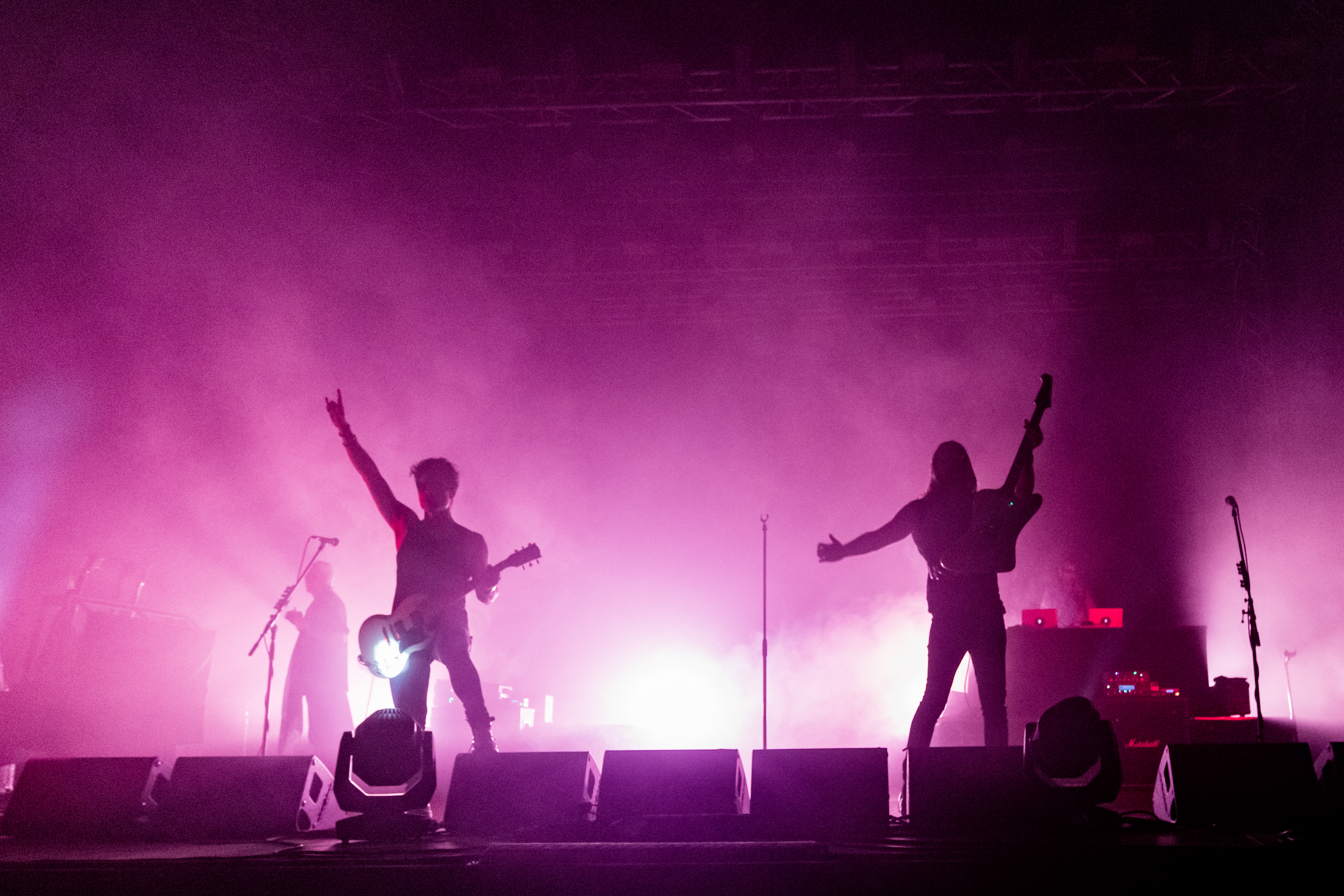
- The Sisters of Mercy performing live in 2019
- Studio albums: 3
- Extended plays: 2
- Compilation albums: 2
- Singles: 16
- Video albums: 3
- Music videos: 9

The discography of the English rock band the Sisters of Mercy consists of three studio albums, two compilation albums, two extended plays (EPs), and sixteen singles. The Sisters of Mercy were formed in Leeds in 1980 by Andrew Eldritch (vocals, drums) and Gary Marx (guitar) and released their debut single, "The Damage Done", the same year on their own independent record label, Merciful Release. In early 1981, Craig Adams (bass) joined the band and they started to use a drum machine, which was christened Doktor Avalanche. Ben Gunn joined the band as a second guitarist by the end of 1981 and this line-up recorded four more singles and two EPs during 1982 and 1983. Guitarist Wayne Hussey replaced Gunn in early 1984 and, after building up their live reputation, The Sisters signed with WEA, who distribute the band's releases on Merciful Release in the United Kingdom and on Elektra Records in the United States. The band's next single, 1984's "Body and Soul", became their first charting effort in the UK when it reached number 46. Three more singles were released before the band reached number 14 on the UK Albums Chart with their debut album, First and Last and Always, which was released in March 1985. Following the album's release, Marx left the band, before the rest of the group disbanded in mid-1985.

After releasing a single and album with the Sisterhood, and a legal dispute with Adams and Hussey over ownership of the band name the Sisters of Mercy, Eldritch reformed the Sisters of Mercy with himself as vocalist and Patricia Morrison on bass. The band continued to be supplemented by the drum machine known as Doktor Avalanche. This new line-up reached number seven in the UK with their first single, "This Corrosion", which was released in September 1987. Floodland, released in November 1987, also made the top ten when it reached number nine on the UK Albums Chart. Two further singles from Floodland – "Dominion" and "Lucretia My Reflection" – reached numbers 13 and 20 in the UK in early 1988.

Another line-up change in early 1990 saw Morrison being replaced on bass by Tony James; guitarists Tim Bricheno and Andreas Bruhn were also recruited. This line-up released the single "More" and the album Vision Thing in October 1990, which reached numbers 21 and 11 on the UK Singles Chart and UK Albums Chart respectively. A further single, "Doctor Jeep", was released from Vision Thing in December 1990 and reached number 37 in the UK. James left the band in 1991 before the single "Temple of Love (1992)", a re-recording of their 1983 single, was released in April 1992 and became the band's highest-charting single when it reached number three in the UK. Some Girls Wander by Mistake, a compilation of the band's early material was also released in April 1992 and reached number five in the UK. With Bricheno leaving the band by the end of 1992, a new guitarist, Adam Pearson, was recruited before the band recorded the single "Under the Gun", which was released in August 1993 and reached number 19 in the UK. A greatest-hits compilation album, A Slight Case of Overbombing, was also released in August 1993 and reached number 14 on the UK Albums Chart. The Sisters of Mercy have not made any more commercial releases, but continue to tour under various line-ups, with Eldritch as the only main stable member.

== Albums ==
=== Studio albums ===
List of studio albums, with selected chart positions and certifications
| Title | Details | Peak chart positions | | | | | | | | Certifications |
| Title | Details | UK | AUS | AUT | GER | NZ | SWE | SWI | US | Certifications |
|---|---|---|---|---|---|---|---|---|---|---|
| First and Last and Always | Released: 11 March 1985; Labels: Merciful Release; Formats: LP, CD, cassette | 14 | — | — | 40 | — | 23 | — | — | BPI: Gold; BVMI: Gold |
| Floodland | Released: 16 November 1987; Labels: Merciful Release; Formats: LP, CD, cassette | 9 | — | — | 32 | 28 | 28 | 24 | 101 | BPI: Gold; BVMI: Gold |
| Vision Thing | Released: 13 November 1990; Labels: Merciful Release, East West; Formats: LP, CD, cassette | 11 | 73 | 21 | 13 | 38 | 22 | 22 | 136 | BPI: Silver; BVMI: Gold |
"—" denotes a recording that did not chart or was not released in that territory.

=== Compilation albums ===
List of compilation albums, with selected chart positions and certifications
| Title | Details | Peak chart positions | | | | | | | | | Certifications |
| Title | Details | UK | AUS | AUT | BEL (WA) | GER | NZ | POR | SWE | SWI | Certifications |
|---|---|---|---|---|---|---|---|---|---|---|---|
| Some Girls Wander by Mistake | Released: 27 April 1992; Labels: Merciful Release, East West; Formats: 2×LP, CD, CS | 5 | 98 | 7 | — | 9 | 27 | — | 17 | 22 | BPI: Silver; BVMI: Gold |
| A Slight Case of Overbombing | Released: 23 August 1993; Labels: Merciful Release, East West; Formats: 2×LP, CD, CS | 14 | — | — | — | 11 | — | — | 11 | 21 | BPI: Gold; BVMI: Gold |
| BBC Sessions 1982–1984 | Released: 17 July 2021; Labels: BBC, Warner Music; Formats: 2×LP, CD | 55 | — | — | 151 | — | — | 49 | — | — | |
| Body and Soul/Walk Away | Released: 20 April 2024; Labels: Warner, Merciful Release; Formats: LP | — | — | — | — | — | — | — | — | — | |
"—" denotes a recording that did not chart or was not released in that territory.

=== Box sets ===
| Title | Details |
|---|---|
| Merciful Release | Released: 2007; Label: Merciful Release, Rhino; Format: 3×CD |

== Extended plays ==
| Title | Details |
|---|---|
| Alice | Released: March 1983; Label: Merciful Release; Format: 12-inch |
| The Reptile House | Released: 16 May 1983; Label: Merciful Release; Format: 12-inch |
| Body and Soul | Released: 4 June 1984; Label: Merciful Release, WEA; Format: 12-inch |

== Singles ==
List of singles, with selected chart positions, showing year released and album name
| Title | Year | Peak chart positions | | | | | | | | | Album |
| Title | Year | UK | AUS | AUT | GER | IRE | NZ | SWE | US Alt | US Dance | Album |
|---|---|---|---|---|---|---|---|---|---|---|---|
| "The Damage Done" | 1980 | — | — | — | — | — | — | — | — | — | Non-album singles |
| "Body Electric" | 1982 | — | — | — | — | — | — | — | — | — | Non-album singles |
| "Alice" | 1982 | — | — | — | — | — | — | — | — | — | Non-album singles |
| "Anaconda" | 1983 | — | — | — | — | — | — | — | — | — | Non-album singles |
| "Temple of Love" | 1983 | — | — | — | — | — | — | — | — | — | Non-album singles |
| "Body and Soul" | 1984 | 46 | — | — | — | — | — | — | — | — | Body and Soul |
| "Walk Away" | 1984 | 45 | — | — | — | — | — | — | — | — | First and Last and Always |
| "No Time to Cry" | 1985 | 63 | — | — | — | — | — | — | — | — | First and Last and Always |
| "This Corrosion" | 1987 | 7 | — | — | 17 | 6 | — | — | — | 38 | Floodland |
| "Dominion" | 1988 | 13 | — | — | — | 7 | — | — | — | 30 | Floodland |
| "Lucretia My Reflection" | 1988 | 20 | — | — | — | 22 | — | — | — | 30 | Floodland |
| "More" | 1990 | 14 | 74 | — | 14 | 10 | 41 | — | 1 | — | Vision Thing |
| "Doctor Jeep" | 1990 | 37 | 125 | — | 45 | — | — | — | — | — | Vision Thing |
| "When You Don't See Me" | 1991 | — | — | — | 74 | — | — | — | — | — | Vision Thing |
| "Temple of Love (1992)" | 1992 | 3 | — | 16 | 5 | 15 | — | 24 | — | — | Non-album single |
| "Under the Gun" | 1993 | 19 | — | — | 40 | — | — | 17 | — | — | A Slight Case of Overbombing |
"—" denotes a recording that did not chart or was not released in that territory.

=== Other charting singles ===
List of promotional singles, with selected chart positions, showing year released and album name
| Title | Year | Peak chart positions | Album |
| Title | Year | US Alt | Album |
|---|---|---|---|
| "Detonation Boulevard" | 1991 | 17 | Vision Thing |

== Videography ==
=== Video albums ===
| Title | Details |
|---|---|
| Wake | Released: 25 February 1986; Label: PolyGram Music Video; Formats: VHS, LD |
| Shot | Released: 31 October 1988; Label: Warner Music Vision; Format: VHS |
| Shot Rev 2.0 | Released: 1993; Label: Warner Music Vision; Format: VHS |

=== Music videos ===
List of music videos, showing year released and directors
| Title | Year | Director |
|---|---|---|
| "Body and Soul" | 1984 | |
| "Walk Away" | 1984 | Stevie Price |
| "No Time to Cry" | 1985 | Pete Cornish |
| "Black Planet" | 1985 | Steve Martin |
| "This Corrosion" | 1987 | Stuart Orme |
| "Dominion" | 1988 | David Hogan |
| "Lucretia My Reflection" | 1988 | Peter Sinclair |
| "1959" | 1988 | Peter Sinclair |
| "More" | 1990 | Dominic Sena |
| "Doctor Jeep" | 1990 | Jon Klein |
| "Detonation Boulevard" | 1991 | Matt Mahurin |
| "Temple of Love (1992)" | 1992 | John Mills |
| "Under the Gun" | 1993 | Jon Klein |
