= List of songs recorded by the Sisters of Mercy =

This list is an attempt to document every song recorded by English rock band The Sisters of Mercy. It does not include songs recorded only separately by the individual members.

== Sisters of Mercy songs ==
Song	Year	Album debut	Songwriter(s)	Lead vocal(s)
"1959"	1987	Floodland	Andrew Eldritch	Andrew Eldritch
"1969"	1982	Alice (EP)	Dave Alexander, Ron Asheton, Scott Asheton, James Osterberg	Andrew Eldritch
"Adrenochrome"	1982	Body Electric (EP)	Andrew Eldritch	Andrew Eldritch
"Afterhours"	1984	Body and Soul (EP)	Andrew Eldritch	Andrew Eldritch
"Alice"	1982	Alice (EP)	Andrew Eldritch	Andrew Eldritch
"Amphetamine Logic"	1984	First and Last and Always	Andrew Eldritch, Gary Marx	Andrew Eldritch
"Anaconda"	1983	Anaconda (EP)	Andrew Eldritch, Gary Marx	Andrew Eldritch
"Black Planet"	1984	First and Last and Always	Andrew Eldritch, Wayne Hussey	Andrew Eldritch
"Blood Money"	1984	"No Time to Cry" (single)	Andrew Eldritch, Wayne Hussey	Andrew Eldritch
"Body and Soul"	1984	Body and Soul (EP)	Andrew Eldritch	Andrew Eldritch
"Body Electric"	1982	Body Electric (EP)	Andrew Eldritch	Andrew Eldritch
"Body Electric" (1984)	1984	Body and Soul (EP)	Andrew Eldritch	Andrew Eldritch
"Burn"	1983	The Reptile House (EP)	Andrew Eldritch	Andrew Eldritch
"Bury Me Deep"	1984	"No Time to Cry" (single)	Andrew Eldritch	Andrew Eldritch
"Colours"	1987	"This Corrosion" (single)	Andrew Eldritch	Andrew Eldritch
"The Damage Done"	1980	The Damage Done (EP)	Andrew Eldritch, Gary Marx	Andrew Eldritch
"Detonation Boulevard"	1990	Vision Thing	Andrew Eldritch	Andrew Eldritch, with Maggie Reilly
"Doctor Jeep"	1990	Vision Thing	Andreas Bruhn, Andrew Eldritch	Andrew Eldritch, with Maggie Reilly
"Dominion/Mother Russia"	1987	Floodland	Andrew Eldritch	Andrew Eldritch
"Driven Like the Snow"	1987	Floodland	Andrew Eldritch	Andrew Eldritch
"Emma"	1988	"Dominion" (single)	Errol Brown, Tony Wilson	Andrew Eldritch
"Finland Red, Egypt White" (The Sisterhood)	1986	Gift (EP)	Andrew Eldritch	Lucas Fox
"First and Last and Always"	1984	First and Last and Always	Andrew Eldritch, Gary Marx	Andrew Eldritch
"Fix"	1983	The Reptile House (EP)	Andrew Eldritch	Andrew Eldritch
"Flood I"	1987	Floodland	Andrew Eldritch	Andrew Eldritch
"Flood II"	1987	Floodland	Andrew Eldritch	Andrew Eldritch
"Floorshow"	1982	Alice (EP)	Craig Adams, Andrew Eldritch, Gary Marx	Andrew Eldritch
"Gimme Shelter"	1983	Temple of Love (EP)	Mick Jagger, Keith Richards	Andrew Eldritch
"Giving Ground" (The Sisterhood)	1986	Gift (EP)	Andrew Eldritch	James Ray
"Heartland"	1983	Temple of Love (EP)	Andrew Eldritch, Gary Marx	Andrew Eldritch
"Home of the Hit-Men"	1980	The Damage Done (EP)	Gary Marx	Gary Marx
"I Was Wrong"	1990	Vision Thing	Andrew Eldritch	Andrew Eldritch
"Jihad" (The Sisterhood)	1986	Gift (EP)	Andrew Eldritch	Patricia Morrison
"Jolene"	1983	Entertainment or Death (Bootleg)	Dolly Parton	Andrew Eldritch
"Kiss the Carpet"	1983	The Reptile House (EP)	Andrew Eldritch	Andrew Eldritch
"Kiss the Carpet" (Reprise)	1983	The Reptile House (EP)	Andrew Eldritch	Andrew Eldritch
Knockin' on Heaven's Door	1985	–	Bob Dylan	Andrew Eldritch
"Lights"	1983	The Reptile House (EP)	Andrew Eldritch	Andrew Eldritch
"Long Train"	1984	"Walk Away" (single)	Andrew Eldritch	Andrew Eldritch
"Lucretia, My Reflection"	1987	Floodland	Andrew Eldritch	Andrew Eldritch
"Marian" (version)	1984	First and Last and Always	Andrew Eldritch, Wayne Hussey	Andrew Eldritch
"More"	1990	Vision Thing	Andrew Eldritch, Jim Steinman	Andrew Eldritch, with Maggie Reilly
"Never Land"	1987	Floodland	Andrew Eldritch	Andrew Eldritch
"Nine While Nine"	1984	First and Last and Always	Andrew Eldritch, Gary Marx	Andrew Eldritch
"No Time to Cry"	1984	First and Last and Always	Craig Adams, Andrew Eldritch, Wayne Hussey, Gary Marx	Andrew Eldritch
"On the Wire"	1984	"Walk Away" (single)	Andrew Eldritch	Andrew Eldritch
"Phantom" (instrumental)	1982	Alice (EP)	Craig Adams, Andrew Eldritch, Gary Marx	Instrumental
"Poison Door"	1984	"Walk Away" (single)	Gary Marx	Andrew Eldritch
"Possession"	1984	First and Last and Always	Craig Adams, Andrew Eldritch, Wayne Hussey	Andrew Eldritch
"Rain from Heaven" (The Sisterhood)	1986	Gift (EP)	Andrew Eldritch	Lucas Fox
"Ribbons"	1990	Vision Thing	Andrew Eldritch	Andrew Eldritch
"A Rock and a Hard Place"	1984	First and Last and Always	Andrew Eldritch, Wayne Hussey	Andrew Eldritch
"Some Kind of Stranger"	1984	First and Last and Always	Andrew Eldritch, Gary Marx	Andrew Eldritch
"Something Fast"	1990	Vision Thing	Andrew Eldritch	Andrew Eldritch, with Maggie Reilly
"Temple of Love"	1983	Temple of Love (EP)	Andrew Eldritch	Andrew Eldritch
"Temple of Love" (1992) (with Ofra Haza)	1992	A Slight Case of Overbombing	Andrew Eldritch	Andrew Eldritch, with Ofra Haza
"This Corrosion"	1987	Floodland	Andrew Eldritch	Andrew Eldritch
"Torch"	1987	Floodland	Andrew Eldritch	Andrew Eldritch
"Train"	1984	Body and Soul (EP)	Andrew Eldritch	Andrew Eldritch
"Under the Gun" (with Terri Nunn)	1993	A Slight Case of Overbombing	Andrew Eldritch, Billie Hughes, Roxanne Seeman	Andrew Eldritch, with Terri Nunn
"Valentine"	1983	The Reptile House (EP)	Andrew Eldritch	Andrew Eldritch
"Vision Thing"	1990	Vision Thing	Andrew Eldritch	Andrew Eldritch, with Maggie Reilly
"Walk Away"	1984	First and Last and Always	Andrew Eldritch, Wayne Hussey	Andrew Eldritch
"Watch"	1980	The Damage Done (EP)	Gary Marx	Gary Marx
"When You Don't See Me"	1990	Vision Thing	Andreas Bruhn, Andrew Eldritch	Andrew Eldritch
"You Could Be the One"	1990	"More" (single)	Andreas Bruhn, Andrew Eldritch	Andrew Eldritch
