= A Slight Case of Overbombing =

Greatest hits album by The Sisters of Mercy
- Released: 23 August 1993
- Recorded: 1984–1993
- Genres: Gothic rock; hard rock
- Length: 73:40
- Labels: Merciful Release; East West
- Producers: Larry Alexander; David M. Allen; Andrew Eldritch; Jim Steinman

The Sisters of Mercy chronology
Some Girls Wander by Mistake (1992)	A Slight Case of Overbombing (1993)	Merciful Release (2007)

Singles from A Slight Case of Overbombing
- 1. "Under the Gun" Released: 16 August 1993

Professional ratings
Review scores
Source	Rating
AllMusic	4/5 stars

A Slight Case of Overbombing is a greatest hits album by English gothic rock band the Sisters of Mercy. It was released on 23 August 1993 on the band's own label, Merciful Release, under distribution contract with East West Records. All the tracks featured on this compilation album are in reverse chronological order of release. A Slight Case of Overbombing contains mostly remixes and edited versions of songs that the Sisters of Mercy had released by 1993, as well as two never-before released tracks: a re-recorded version of "Temple of Love" from 1992, and one new track, "Under the Gun", which was released as a single to promote this compilation album and is also the band's most recent single as of 2026.

== Track listing ==
A Slight Case of Overbombing track listing
No.	Title	Lyrics	Music	Original album/EP	Length
1.	"Under the Gun"	Andrew Eldritch, Roxanne Seeman	Billie Hughes	None	5:42
2.	"Temple of Love" (1992 version)	Eldritch	Eldritch	None	8:07
3.	"Vision Thing" (Canadian club mix)	Eldritch	Eldritch	Vision Thing 1990	7:34
4.	"Detonation Boulevard" (radio edit)	Eldritch	Andreas Bruhn, Eldritch	Vision Thing	3:50
5.	"Doctor Jeep" (7" radio edit)	Eldritch	Bruhn, Eldritch	Vision Thing	3:02
6.	"More"	Eldritch, Jim Steinman	Eldritch, Steinman	Vision Thing	8:24
7.	"Lucretia My Reflection" (12" extended mix)	Eldritch	Eldritch	Floodland 1987	8:44
8.	"Dominion/Mother Russia"	Eldritch	Eldritch	Floodland	7:02
9.	"This Corrosion" (single edit)	Eldritch	Eldritch	Floodland	10:17
10.	"No Time to Cry" (British mix)	Eldritch	Craig Adams, Wayne Hussey, Gary Marx	First and Last and Always 1985	3:57
11.	"Walk Away"	Eldritch	Hussey	First and Last and Always	3:24
12.	"Body and Soul"	Eldritch	Eldritch	Body and Soul 1984	3:32
Total length:					73:40

== Personnel ==
Track 1

- Andrew Eldritch – vocals, keyboards
- Adam Pearson – guitar
- Doktor Avalanche (drum machine) – drums

Track 2

- Andrew Eldritch – vocals, keyboards
- Tim Bricheno – guitar
- Andreas Bruhn – guitar
- Doktor Avalanche (drum machine) – drums

Tracks 3–6

- Andrew Eldritch – vocals, keyboards
- Tim Bricheno – guitar
- Andreas Bruhn – guitar
- Tony James – bass guitar
- Doktor Avalanche (drum machine) – drums

Tracks 7–9

- Andrew Eldritch – vocals, guitars, keyboards
- Patricia Morrison – bass guitar
- Doktor Avalanche (drum machine) – drums, synth bass

Tracks 10–12

- Andrew Eldritch – vocals, keyboards
- Craig Adams – bass guitar
- Wayne Hussey – guitars
- Gary Marx – guitars
- Doktor Avalanche (drum machine) – drums

Additional personnel

- Terri Nunn – vocals (track 1)
- Ofra Haza – vocals (track 2)
- Tony James – bass guitar (track 2)
- Maggie Reilly – backing vocals (tracks 3-6)
- John Perry – guitar (track 4)

== Charts ==
=== Weekly charts ===
Weekly chart performance for A Slight Case of Overbombing
Chart (1993)	Peak position
European Albums (Music & Media)	28
German Albums (Offizielle Top 100)	11
Swedish Albums (Sverigetopplistan)	11
Swiss Albums (Schweizer Hitparade)	21
UK Albums (Official Charts)	14

Chart (2024–2025)	Peak position
Greek Albums (IFPI)	25
Hungarian Physical Albums (MAHASZ)	16

=== Year-end charts ===
Year-end chart performance for A Slight Case of Overbombing
Chart (1992)	Position
German Albums (Offizielle Top 100)	95

== Certifications ==
Certifications for A Slight Case of Overbombing
Region	Certification	Certified units/sales
Germany (BVMI)	Gold	250,000^{^}
United Kingdom (BPI)	Gold	100,000^{^}
^{^} Shipments figures based on certification alone.
