= Temple of Love (The Sisters of Mercy song) =

1983 and 1992 single

Single by the Sisters of Mercy
- B-side: "Heartland"; "Gimme Shelter"
- Released: 7 October 1983
- Genre: Gothic rock
- Length: 7:44 (12-inch); 3:52 (7-inch)
- Label: Merciful Release
- Songwriter: Andrew Eldritch
- Producer: Andrew Eldritch

The Sisters of Mercy singles chronology
"Anaconda" (1983)	"Temple of Love" (1983)	"Body and Soul" (1984)

"Temple of Love" is a song by the English rock band the Sisters of Mercy, released as a non-album single in October 1983 by Merciful Release. After being out of print for years, the song was re-recorded in 1992 as "Temple of Love (1992)" featuring Israeli singer Ofra Haza. This version became the band's biggest hit in its native United Kingdom, peaking at number three on the UK singles chart. It also reached the top five in Germany, the top 20 in Austria and Ireland, and the top 25 in Sweden.

== Background ==
"Temple of Love", written by the band's lead singer Andrew Eldritch, was the fifth single released by the Sisters of Mercy. It did not chart on the United Kingdom's main singles chart, but it reached number one for a week on the UK Indie Chart and stayed on the chart for 36 weeks.

"Temple of Love (1992)"

Single by the Sisters of Mercy
- B-side: "I Was Wrong"; "Vision Thing"; "When You Don't See Me"
- Released: 20 April 1992
- Genre: Hard rock
- Length: 8:05; 4:40 (7-inch)
- Label: Merciful Release
- Songwriter: Andrew Eldritch
- Producers: Andrew Eldritch; Ian Stanley

The Sisters of Mercy singles chronology
"When You Don't See Me" (1991)	"Temple of Love (1992)" (1992)	"Under the Gun" (1993)

=== "Temple of Love (1992)" ===
Following the release of the band's third album Vision Thing in 1990, there appeared to be no plans for a new record anytime soon, leading the band's record label Merciful Release to reissue the band's early non-album singles and B-sides, which had been out of print at this point, on the compilation Some Girls Wander by Mistake. This included the extended 12-inch version of the original "Temple of Love" recording. In conjunction with this release, the Sisters of Mercy also recorded a new version of "Temple of Love" featuring Israeli singer Ofra Haza, whom Eldritch was a longtime fan of.

"Temple of Love (1992)" did not appear on Some Girls Wander by Mistake, but it did appear on the Sisters of Mercy's greatest hits album A Slight Case of Overbombing, released a year later in 1993. It was produced by Eldritch, and additional production credits were given to Ian Stanley, the former Tears for Fears keyboardist.

The song does appear on the 2017 deluxe reissue of Some Girls Wander by Mistake.

In 2025, fashion designer Rick Owens named his "Temple of Love" retrospective exhibition at the Palais Galliera in Paris after the song.

== Track listing ==
CD: Merciful Release / MR53CD
No.	Title	Length
1.	"Temple of Love (1992)"	8:05
2.	"I Was Wrong (American Fade)"	3:12
3.	"Vision Thing (Canadian Club Remix)"	7:32
4.	"When You Don't See Me (German Release)"	4:45

== Charts ==
=== Weekly charts ===
==== "Temple of Love" ====
Chart (1983)	Peak position
UK Indie (OCC)	1

==== "Temple of Love (1992)" ====
Chart (1992)	Peak position
Austria (Ö3 Austria Top 40)	16
Germany (GfK)	5
Ireland (IRMA)	15
Sweden (Sverigetopplistan)	24
UK Singles (Official Charts)	3
UK Airplay (Music Week)	27

=== Year-end charts ===
==== "Temple of Love (1992)" ====
Chart (1992)	Peak position
Germany (Media Control)	20
Sweden (Topplistan)	86
