= Floodland (album) =

Studio album by the Sisters of Mercy
- Released: 16 November 1987
- Recorded: 1987
- Studios: Power Station (New York City); Strawberry (Stockport); The Wool Hall (Bath) (Note: The studios used for recording are uncredited in the album's liner notes. They are listed based on the band members' and producers' accounts of the sessions.)
- Genres: Gothic rock; dark wave
- Length: 45:27
- Label: Merciful Release
- Producers: Andrew Eldritch; Larry Alexander; Jim Steinman

The Sisters of Mercy chronology
First and Last and Always (1985)	Floodland (1987)	Vision Thing (1990)

Singles from Floodland
- 1. "This Corrosion" Released: September 1987; 2. "Dominion" Released: February 1988; 3. "Lucretia My Reflection" Released: June 1988

Floodland is the second studio album by the English gothic rock band the Sisters of Mercy. It was released on 16 November 1987, through Merciful Release, a subsidiary of WEA, internationally and through Elektra Records in the United States. After the release of the band's debut studio album, First and Last and Always (1985), members Craig Adams and Wayne Hussey left to form the Mission, causing the dissolution of the Sisters of Mercy. As a result, band frontman Andrew Eldritch formed a side project known as the Sisterhood. After the first Sisterhood album was received negatively overall, Eldritch restarted the Sisters of Mercy and hired the Sisterhood member Patricia Morrison for the recording of a new album.

Eldritch wrote the songs of Floodland in Hamburg; the city's large amount of water influenced its title as well as the recurring lyrical theme of water. He then called upon Larry Alexander to produce the album with him and Jim Steinman to produce the songs "Dominion" / "Mother Russia" and "This Corrosion". Recording sessions began at Power Station Studios in New York City during January 1987 and carried on throughout the first half of the year at Strawberry Studios in Stockport and The Wool Hall in Bath. Eldritch served as the vocalist, performed all instruments, and programmed the band's drum machine, "Doktor Avalanche".

The drum machine acted as the drum player; other than backing vocals, Morrison did not contribute to the album despite being a member of the Sisters of Mercy. In contrast to the conventional group-based recording sessions for First and Last and Always, Floodland was pieced together on computers using sequencers. The music incorporates the genres of gothic rock and dark wave, while the lyrical content sees Eldritch cast as the observer of a slowly deteriorating world. Some of the events that inspired certain songs include the Chernobyl disaster, the Cold War, and the band's previous break-up.

The singles "This Corrosion", "Dominion", and "Lucretia My Reflection" were released in promotion. "This Corrosion" peaked at number 7 on the UK Singles Chart, while "Dominion" and "Lucretia My Reflection" peaked at number 13 and 20, respectively. Floodland debuted on the UK Albums Chart at number 9, later being certified gold in UK by the BPI for selling 100,000 copies. It also reached the top 40 in other European countries, including Switzerland. Despite initially receiving mixed reviews from music critics, Floodland has retrospectively received praise and been considered a seminal gothic rock album by several critics.

== Background ==
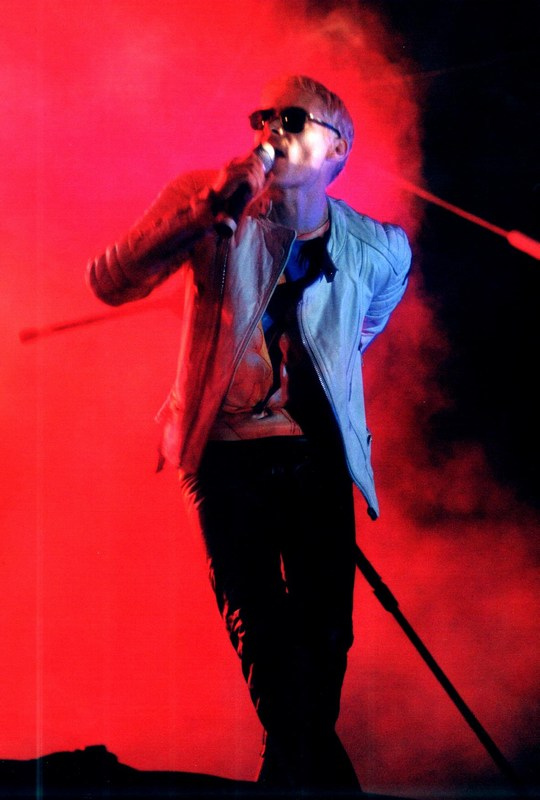
Band frontman Andrew Eldritch (pictured in 2000) had formed the Sisterhood following the break-up of the Sisters of Mercy.

After the release of the Sisters of Mercy debut studio album First and Last and Always in March 1985, frontman Andrew Eldritch intended for them to record an ABBA cover as a single, and tried to hire Jim Steinman as a producer. Eldritch originally contacted him when the ABBA song "Gimme! Gimme! Gimme!" (1979) was part of the band's setlist. Steinman was interested in producing the cover version, but was too busy at that time. Shortly afterward, the Sisters of Mercy disbanded. The break-up occurred while the band prepared their second studio album in October 1985, which was going to be titled Left on Mission and Revenge. Eldritch, who had still intended to record the album but as a solo artist, called bassist Patricia Morrison that same month, who was on a tour of the United Kingdom with her band Fur Bible in support of Siouxsie and the Banshees, asking Morrison to collaborate.

The music press reported the break-up of the band on 2 November 1985: "the Sisters of Mercy were down to singer Andrew Eldritch and his faithful drum machine [Doktor Avalanche] this week after guitarist Wayne Hussey and bassist Craig Adams left the band. Although this has scuppered recording plans for a new album this month, Andrew now intends to record the same album in the New Year and could well be using Wayne as a session guitarist. [...] Andrew has also approached former Gun Club bassist Patricia Morrison—now in Fur Bible—to play on the album, but it's not yet known whether Andrew will continue with the name Sisters of Mercy." Eldritch had no intention to carry on under the disformed band's name, as members who left to form the Mission had an agreement with him that the name the Sisters of Mercy would be used by no one after the break-up.

Eldritch released the single "Giving Ground" on 20 January 1986 as part of a project under the name the Sisterhood, which features vocals by his musician friend James Ray. At the end of February 1986, the record label Merciful Release announced that the "forthcoming Andrew Eldritch album which for some months has had the working title Left on Mission and Revenge." The album was eventually titled Gift, being released in July 1986, again by the Sisterhood. It was recorded at Fairview Studios in Willerby, Hull. Eldritch did not sing on the album for contractual reasons, though Morrison collaborated with him for the first time, contributing a spoken passage on the track "Jihad". Gift was negatively received overall and Eldritch lost his publishing deal with RCA Music Limited as a result of it. A 12-inch EP by the Sisterhood entitled This Corrosion was planned for release and set to feature an American vocalist, whose identity was meant to be kept secret until release. The EP had been recorded at Fairview Studios with Alan Vega but remained unreleased, with Eldritch instead keeping the idea for when he would reboot the Sisters of Mercy.

== Recording ==
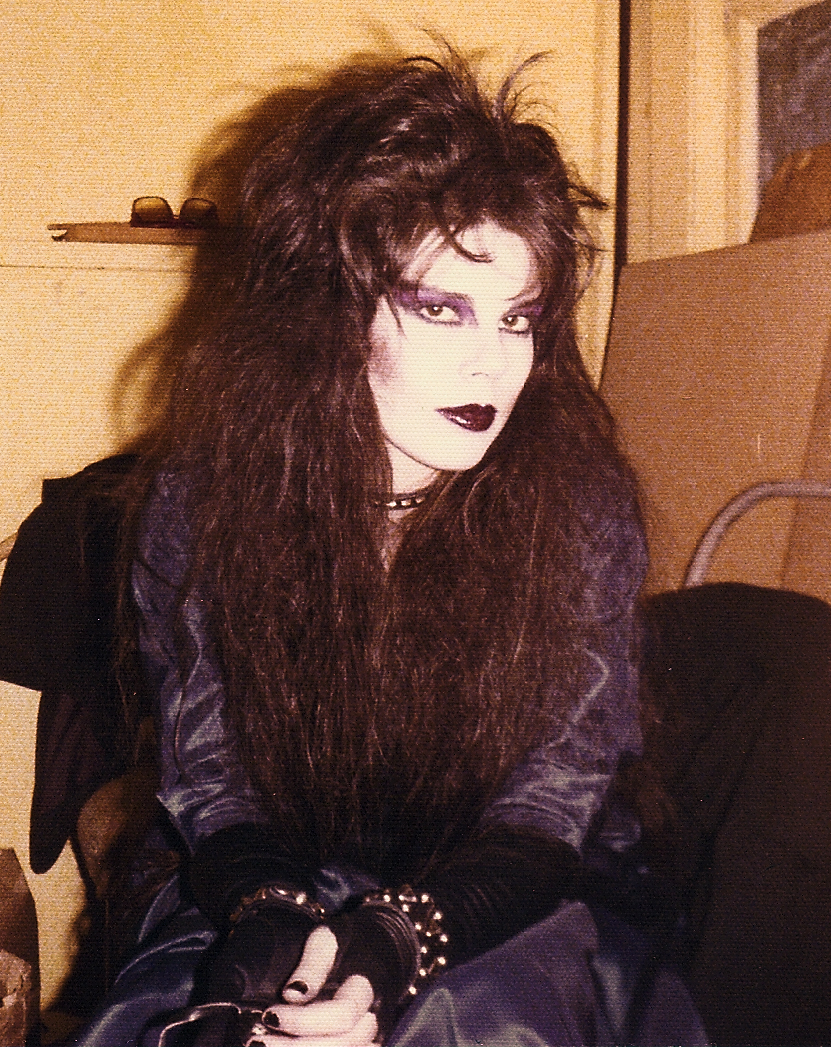
Eldritch hired Patricia Morrison (pictured, c. 1978) with the intention of having her play bass guitar on the album.

After what was dubbed the "Sisterhood fiasco" by Sounds, Eldritch decided to continue under the name the Sisters of Mercy, feeling as though doing so would improve the name's reputation after the previous fallout. He also thought that it would have been nonsensical to change the name, as he still wrote songs the same way as before. Eldritch, who in 1985 first moved to Bramfeld and then to St. Pauli, began to compose a new album while in Hamburg, under the Warner Elektra Atlantic (WEA) label. The demos for the album were mainly recorded with a Casio CZ-101 synthesiser, acoustic guitars and a new drum machine. At the time, Eldritch was attempting to find a MIDI drum machine of a modest price that featured a "tighter snare drum" sound.

Despite hiring her to play bass guitar on the album, Eldritch later claimed that Morrison did not contribute to the songwriting for it, with him saying that it was practically a solo record. Eldritch insinuated that she suffered from writer's block and was unable to come up with many musical ideas, also adding that he "couldn't even get her to pick up the bass in the first place." He reaffirmed this in a 2012 interview with Classic Rock, stating that she "didn't make the cut" and therefore did not appear on Floodland. Merciful Release office manager Boyd Steemson also gave confirmation that Morrison's contributions were minimal. Eldritch denied that his approach to songwriting had changed since the band split, saying "'This Corrosion' sounds like 'Temple of Love' II, '1959' sounds like 'Afterhours' part 2. I don't see any difference or any real change. I think I just carry on where I stopped." He licensed the publishing to SBK Songs Limited, which is now part of EMI Music Publishing.

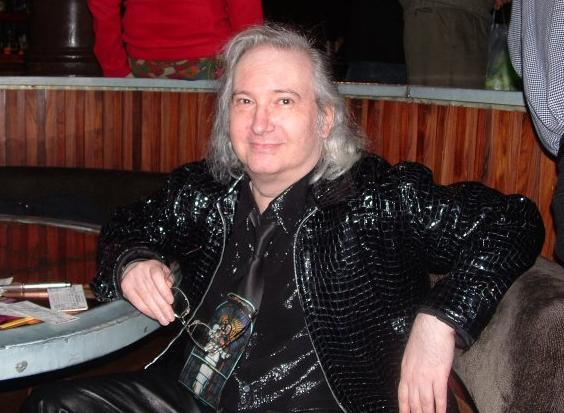
Jim Steinman (pictured in 2005) served as a producer for "Dominion" / "Mother Russia", and "This Corrosion".

The starting point for the album was the song "This Corrosion", which was set to be produced by Steinman. Eldritch had immediately thought of him when he came up with the idea for the song. He stated that "when we were trying to sell 'Corrosion' to Steinman, we told him it was like the high-point of a Borgia's disco evening and he went for it." Eldritch also used Steinman to get his record label to concede an appropriate recording budget. He figured that the label would not grant money to use on choirs, but that they would immediately do so if Steinman were to ask for it. According to Steemson, Max Hole, the head of WEA's A&R, managed to get the band a budget of £50,000 for "This Corrosion".

The recording of "This Corrosion" and "Dominion" / "Mother Russia" started during January 1987 in New York City. Steinman and Eldritch used Power Station Studios in the city's Manhattan borough, where they worked with engineer Larry Alexander. On both songs, Steinman used six background singers and 40 members of the New York Choral Society. Eldritch recalled that he was unsure as to why so many vocalists sung all at once, but noted that this "seemed like a good idea at the time" and worked out well in the end. Steinman mainly focused on the production of the choral singings and did not contribute much to the actual composition and arrangements. This caused him to receive only partial production credit on "Dominion / Mother Russia".

The remainder of Floodland was recorded in England. Initially, Eldritch worked with an unknown producer, whom he eventually fired. He called Alexander while in New York City and hired him as a co-producer. The two travelled to England, where they recorded at multiple studios. They spent time at Strawberry Studios in Stockport before transitioning to The Wool Hall in Bath to finish recording. The mixing for the album was then done at AIR Studios in London.

== Composition ==
=== Music ===
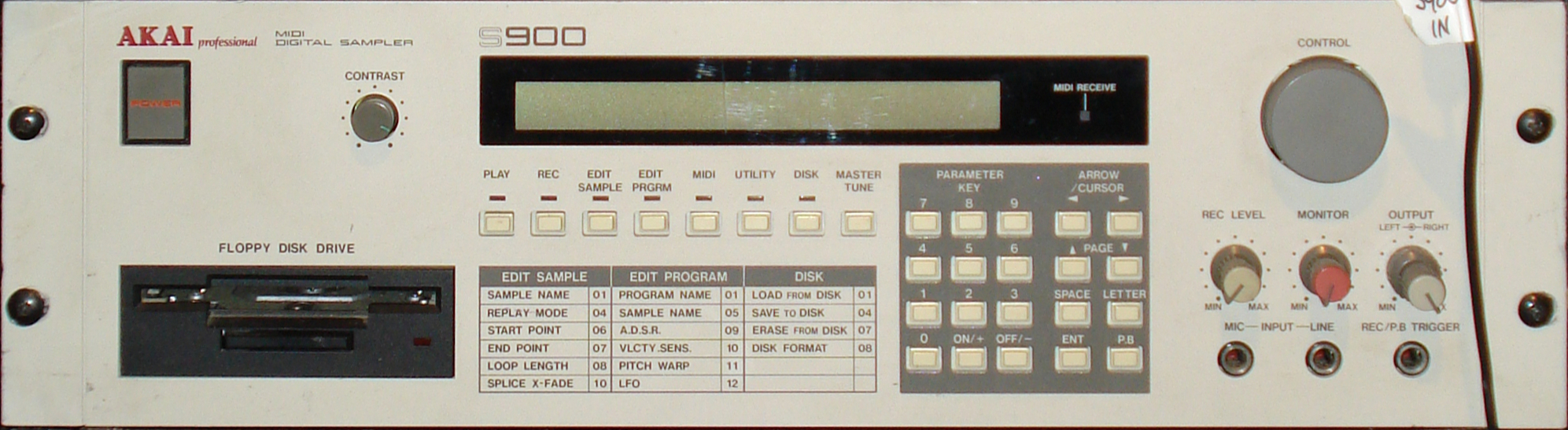
An Akai S900 sampler, the model Eldritch used to assemble the drum sounds on Floodland.

The music of Floodland was described as a mix of gothic rock and dark wave. In contrast to the Sisters of Mercy's previous album, First and Last and Always, which had been recorded in a conventional way, Floodland was pieced together on a computer that used sequencers to help. Eldritch worked on the recorded parts with a Voyetra Sequencer Plus, while a Yamaha SPX90 was used as an effects unit and the parts were saved on a Compaq Portable 286. The guitars were played by Eldritch himself, apart from the solo on "This Corrosion", which was played by Steinman's friend Eddie Martinez. The drum sounds on the album were sampled together from various drum machines with an Akai S900. The tom sound was from an Oberheim DMX, which had previously been used on First and Last and Always. The other drum sounds were from a Yamaha RX-5. The track "1959" features only the sound of a piano, but was pieced together with a sequencer by Eldritch and played without an actual piano.

=== Lyrics ===
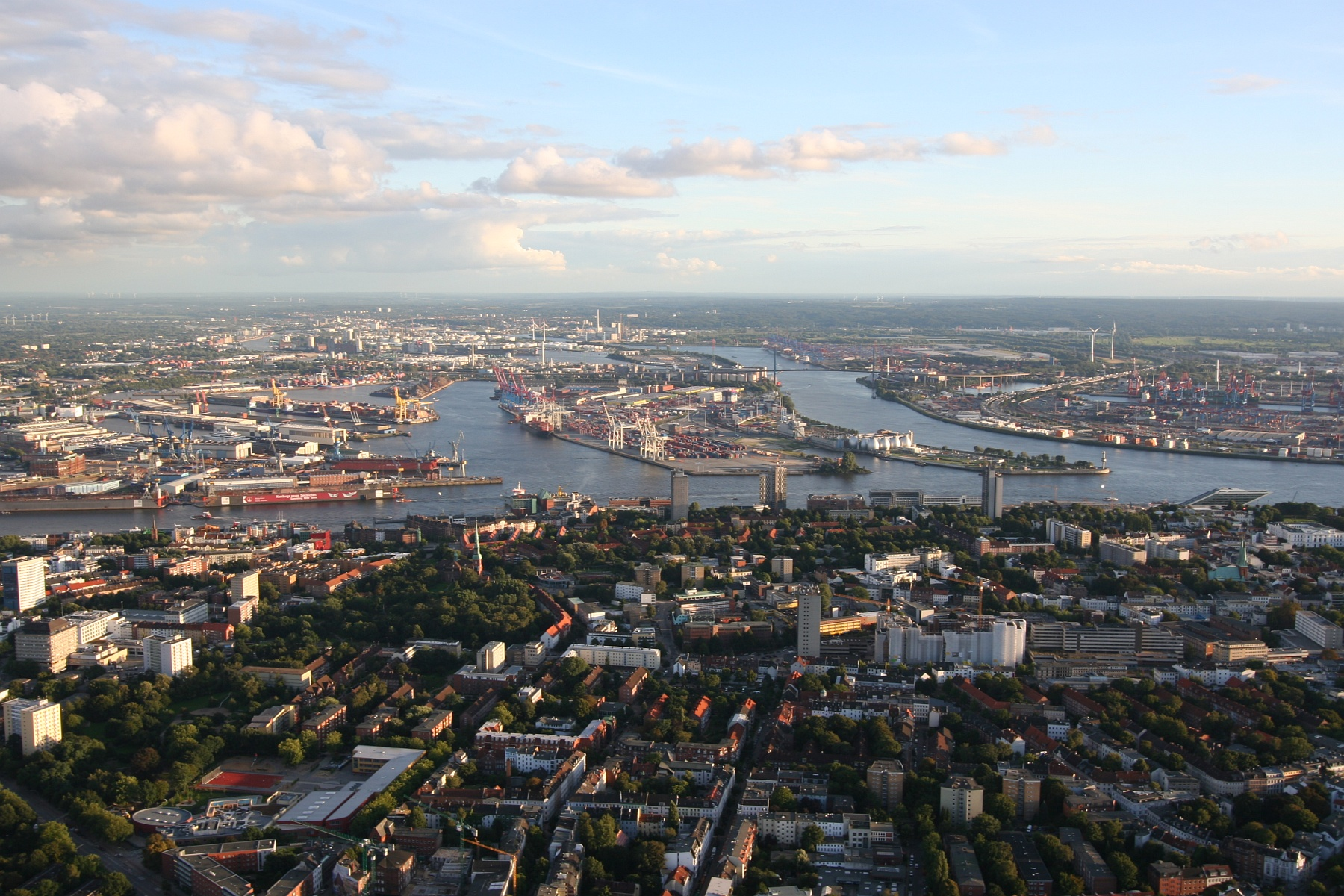
Hamburg, where Eldritch resided while writing the songs of Floodland, inspired the album's title and recurring theme of water.

Regarding the title Floodland, Eldritch realised that, after writing all the songs for the album, the theme of water came up repeatedly. He attributed the theme's recurrence to the amount of water within Hamburg, where he was writing these songs. Michael Bonner of Uncut viewed Eldritch as casting himself in a role where he is a "jaded observer, watching cynically as he and the world slouch towards Armageddon," adding that the songs are bonded together by "images of the apocalypse that straddle the gap between the personal and the political."

Floodland's two-part opening track, "Dominion" / "Mother Russia", was inspired by "Ozymandias" (1818), a Shelley sonnet about a tyrant whose legacy of conquest diminishes as time passes by, from which one line is lifted. Bonner noted that the song seemed to have been inspired by geopolitics of the Cold War as well. Eldritch additionally took inspiration from his time in Central Europe during the aftermath of the 1986 Chernobyl disaster. He considered the song to be about "the prostitution of Europe by the Americans," adding that this was a part of his "hate/hate relationship with America. I just had the idea of all them huddled in their mobile homes while Mother Russia rained down on them." "Flood I" and "Flood II" both use the word "flood" as a metaphor for sex. Eldritch felt that a flood could be something stimulating, adding: "most people [...] only get wet under certain circumstances." He called "Lucretia My Reflection" his "Welcome on board, Patricia" song, saying that he had always thought of her as a "Lucretia-type person." "1959" is a partially-autobiographical song, which takes its title from Eldritch's birth year. He thought that the song regards "innocence–inherited as opposed to environmental."

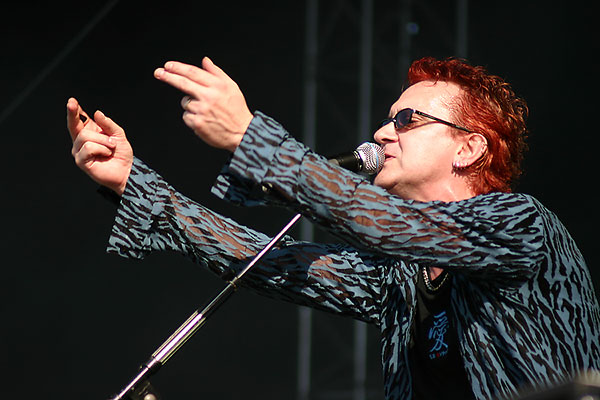
The departure of Wayne Hussey (pictured in 2004) from the band and his songwriting style served as inspirations for the lyrics of "This Corrosion".

The centrepiece of the album, "This Corrosion", goes back to the conflict between Eldritch and his former bandmates, who had formed the Mission. The lyrics of the track are a parody of lyrics in the manner that Hussey especially wrote them, which Eldritch considered to be typically "clichéd" and "meaningless". As a result, Eldritch felt that most of the lyrics "should be thought of in quotation marks. It would be too confusing to print them all." He also noted that "This Corrosion" on the lyrics sheet is capitalised in the style of a song title because "it's the title of somebody else's song," recalling a list of song titles that Hussey kept to himself. Eldritch claimed that Hussey would select the titles that he thought were the best and generate lyrics out of them, adding that "It didn't have to have any meaning, it just had to sound good."

"Driven Like the Snow", similarly to "Nine While Nine" from First and Last and Always, is about Eldritch's former girlfriend Claire Shearsby, even being noted as "Nine While Nine Part 2" by him. He thought of the song as a way to logically explain why their relationship had to fall apart. Speaking of "Never Land", Eldritch commented that it imagines "the entire population of the earth starting to travel from some indefinable point in space toward the earth at increasing speed. It would take an eternity to reach the earth—by which time you'd be reasonably spiritualised—and even when you reached the destination, you wouldn't actually hit the ground. You'd be going so fast you'd just go through and out the other side, where there is another eternity of nothingness. I just tried to write a song about these impressions." The lyrics Eldritch spoke of were found on the full 12-minute version of the song, which remained unreleased until it was included on the 2006 reissue of Floodland.

== Release and promotion ==
"This Corrosion" was selected as the lead single from Floodland, although Eldritch initially had pleaded for "Dominion" to be the lead single. The song was released on 21 September 1987 through Merciful Release, a subsidiary of WEA operated by Eldritch, being released as a 7-inch, 12-inch, CD and cassette; each version contained a different mix of the song. Eldritch originally wanted the long version on the single release, but the record label preferred an edited version. The mix of the LP version is similar to that of the 12-inch version, though the version lasts about 45 seconds longer. The cassette version was mixed by Steinman, and differs from other single versions. The B-side of the single was "Torch", which Eldritch produced and played every instrument for. It had been written in 1985 for the scrapped album Left on Mission and Revenge album. The 12-inch single added Eldritch's version of the Sisterhood song "Colours" (1985), while WEA conceded a budget of over £50,000 for the music video of "This Corrosion". The video was shot at a warehouse in Wapping and directed by Stuart Orme. The Sisters of Mercy wanted to film in Kazakhstan of the Soviet Union, but at the same time, Russian record label Melodiya were in negotiations with the West regarding video rights, and filming there would have botched the negotiations.

Floodland was released in the United Kingdom on 16 November 1987, later receiving a release in the United States on 11 January 1988 through Elektra Records. The album had simultaneous releases on vinyl, cassette, and CD. The cassette release included "Torch", the B-side to "This Corrosion", and the CD release included both "Torch" and "Colours", the latter being another B-side from the single releases for "This Corrosion", as bonus tracks. Morrison's name was not included in the credits for Floodland, although she was pictured on the sleeve and appeared under her real name of Anne Rainone in the "Thanks" section of the inner sleeve. She downplayed the lack of inclusion in interviews, saying: "if you look at Sisters' records, the names for what people play usually aren't there. Andrew writes the songs so there's no reason for anyone else to be featured. I was well aware of that when the album came out but what I didn't realise was that it would confuse other people. If people haven't seen the press we've done, they don't know I'm in the band." Eldritch still considered Morrison to be a vital part of the Sisters of Mercy, as she contributed greatly to the band's visual identity by appearing in music videos released for Floodland and on the album cover. Eldritch chose not to embark on a tour to promote the album, feeling that it was not made to be played live. He later recalled not having a band ready to accompany him on a tour, which was the real reason why he chose not to tour and instead opted to promote Floodland through singles, music videos, and television appearances only.

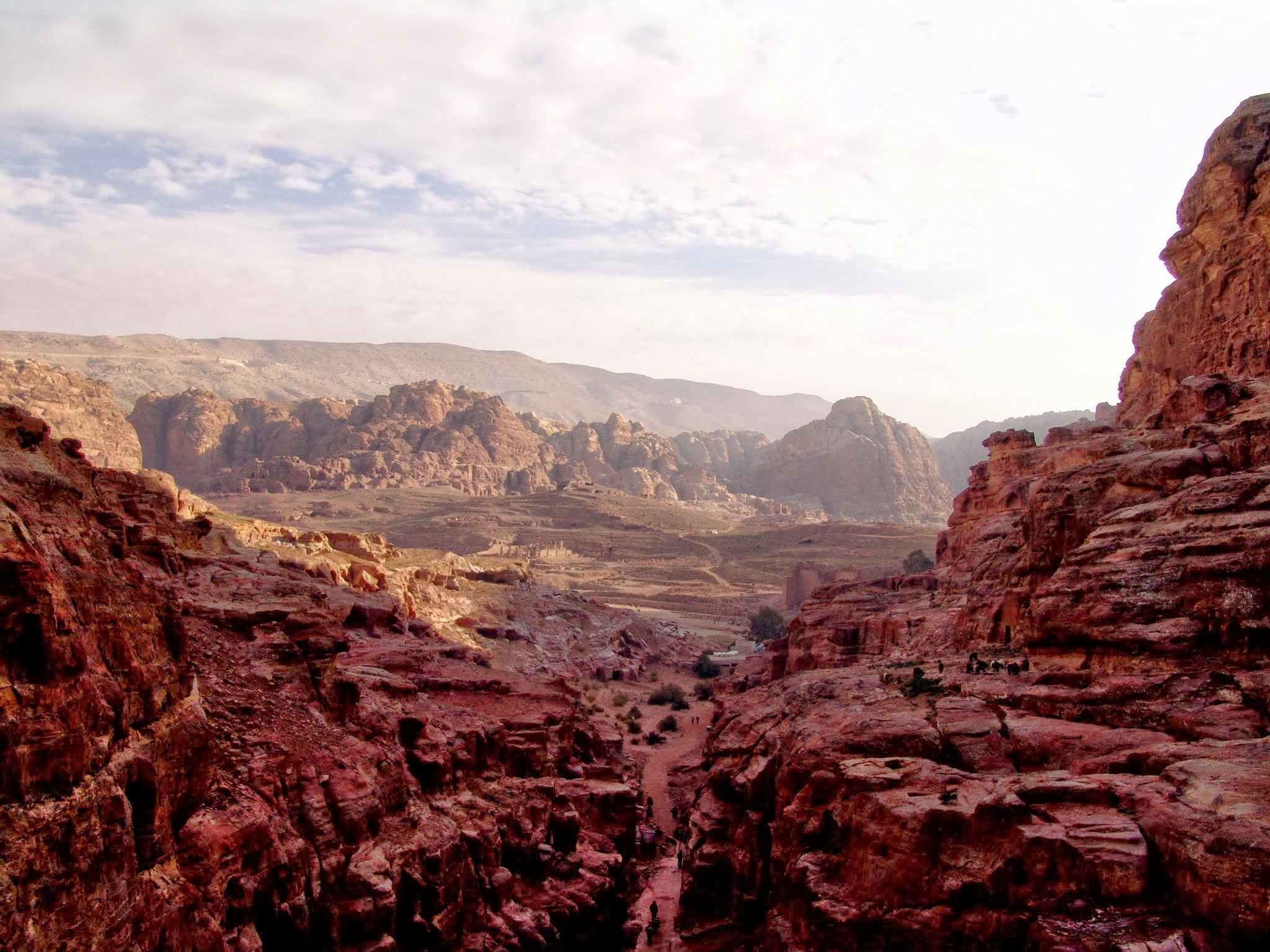
Petra, the city where the music video for "Dominion" was filmed.

Following the release of Floodland in November, a remix of "Dominion" was released as the second single in the last week of February 1988. A cover version of the Hot Chocolate song "Emma" (1974) was recorded to be released as part of the single. The single's other B-side tracks, made from various "Dominion" segments, were prepared shortly before the "Dominion" music video shoot. "Sandstorm" consists of various sampled saxophone and keyboard parts from "Dominion", mixed to a moody short instrumental track, which was used in the opening section of the video. "Untitled" is a slowed-down instrumental excerpt from "Dominion". The CD single for the song contained "Ozymandias", which is "Dominion" played backwards. The video for "Dominion" was filmed during February 1988 in the Jordanian city of Petra; it was the first ever music video to have been shot in Jordan. After the commercial success of "This Corrosion", WEA had again conceded a budget of £50,000 and they enlisted director David Hogan, who shot the video in two days after four-and-a-half months of preparation. Eldritch called the video "Lawrence of Arabia part two."

The third and final single from the album, a remix of "Lucretia My Reflection", was released on 27 May 1988. The B-side of the single was "Long Train"; the title references lyrics from "Lucretia My Reflection". An accompanying music video was filmed by director Peter Sinclair at locations in India, including a cotton mill in Bombay. Eldritch had also considered releasing "1959" as a single at some point; it was later released as a promotional single that aimed for radio play. The song also received a music video that was filmed in India.

== Reception ==
=== Critical ===
Professional ratings
Review scores
Source	Rating
AllMusic	4.5/5 stars
Classic Rock	7/10
MusicHound	4/5
Pitchfork	9.1/10
Q	4/5 stars
Record Mirror	4.5/5
Rolling Stone	3/5 stars
Sputnikmusic	4/5
Uncut	5/5 stars
The Village Voice	C+

Floodland was met with mixed reviews from music critics. Mark Coleman of Rolling Stone felt that the album was a step down from the Sisters of Mercy's previous material. He described it as "Meat Loaf joining the Cure for a remake of Lou [Reed]'s Berlin", adding that the album is "hilarious, sure, but always listenable at the very least". Coleman provided praise, however, for "This Corrosion", calling it a "bona fide toe-tapper of a single." In The Village Voice, Robert Christgau compared the band's "doldrums" negatively to fellow gothic rock band Fields of the Nephilim, albeit less dumb as well as compensated with "disco" and "proper nouns".

Floodland has since received retrospective praise from music critics, however. Writing for AllMusic, Chris True heralded the album as "a definite milestone", complimenting its "lush production" and "lyric imagery that is both scary and glorious." He added that the band create "a black soundscape that is majestic and vast" with "Dominion" / "Mother Russia" and that "slower tracks, like 'Flood' and '1959,' are some of the best ethereal sounds goth has to offer, and the downright regal 'This Corrosion' is one of the best songs of the genre." Sputnikmusic staff member ManosG wrote that "Floodland may not be as dark, influential or focused as the band’s debut but is still an excellent album with an amazing vocal performance by Andrew [Eldritch]". He also called "Lucretia My Reflection" one of the best songs in the Sisters of Mercy's discography, alongside giving praise to "Dominion / Mother Russia", "1959", "This Corrosion", and "Flood II". Pitchfork's Sam Sodomsky described it as a "goth rock masterpiece" and "a dramatic and winkingly macabre record". Floodland was later considered an essential gothic rock album by Classic Rock, Consequence, Spectrum Culture, LA Weekly, and Treble.

=== Commercial ===
Floodland reached number nine on the UK Albums Chart. Preorders alone assured the album silver certification on the day of its release, and on 11 March 1988 it was certified gold in the UK by the British Phonographic Industry (BPI) for selling 100,000 units. According to Eldritch, Floodland recouped the high production costs in 1989. In Germany, which Eldritch claimed was the band's second largest market behind the UK, the album entered the Top 100 albums chart on 14 December 1987 at number 32, remaining on the chart for 20 weeks. In 1993, Floodland was certified gold in Germany by the Bundesverband Musikindustrie (BVMI) for sales of 250,000 units. In the US, the album debuted at number 174 on the Billboard 200 during the week of 6 February 1988. It went on to peak at number 101, after spending six weeks on the chart, during the week of 12 March 1988.

== Track listing ==
Floodland vinyl track listing

All tracks are written by Andrew Eldritch

Side one
No.	Title	Producer(s)	Length
1.	"Dominion" / "Mother Russia"	Larry Alexander, Andrew Eldritch, Jim Steinman	7:00
2.	"Flood I"	Alexander, Eldritch	6:22
3.	"Lucretia My Reflection"	Alexander, Eldritch	4:57
4.	"1959"	Alexander, Eldritch	4:09

Side two
No.	Title	Producer(s)	Length
5.	"This Corrosion"	Steinman	9:16
6.	"Flood II"	Alexander, Eldritch	6:19
7.	"Driven Like the Snow"	Alexander, Eldritch	4:39
8.	"Never Land" (a fragment)	Alexander, Eldritch	2:46
Total length:			45:27

Cassette track listing

Side one
No.	Title	Producer(s)	Length
1.	"Dominion" / "Mother Russia"		7:00
2.	"Flood I"		6:22
3.	"Lucretia My Reflection"		4:57
4.	"1959"		4:09
5.	"Torch"	Eldritch	3:55

Side two
No.	Title	Length
6.	"This Corrosion"	10:55
7.	"Flood II"	6:47
8.	"Driven Like the Snow"	6:27
9.	"Never Land" (a fragment)	2:55
Total length:		53:28

CD track listing

No.	Title	Producer(s)	Length
1.	"Dominion" / "Mother Russia"		7:01
2.	"Flood I"		6:22
3.	"Lucretia My Reflection"		4:57
4.	"1959"		4:09
5.	"This Corrosion"		10:55
6.	"Flood II"		6:47
7.	"Driven Like the Snow"		6:27
8.	"Never Land" (a fragment)		2:55
9.	"Torch"		3:55
10.	"Colours"	Alexander, Eldritch	7:23
Total length:			60:51

2006 reissue bonus tracks

No.	Title	Writer(s)	Length
11.	"Never Land" (full length version)	Eldritch	12:00
12.	"Emma"	Errol Brown, Tony Wilson	6:21
Total length:			79:12

== Personnel ==
Personnel adapted from Floodland liner notes, except where noted otherwise.

The Sisters of Mercy (Note: The band members' instruments are not credited in the album's liner notes. Their primary instruments are listed based on the band members' accounts of the album's recording and their de facto primary roles in the band.)

- Andrew Eldritch – lead vocals and backing vocals, Sampler, synthesizers, sequencer, electric guitars, bass and drum machine programming
- Patricia Morrison – bass and backing vocals
- "Doktor Avalanche" – drum machine

Technical personnel

- Larry Alexander – production (tracks 1–4, 6–8)
- Andrew Eldritch – engineering, production (tracks 1–4, 6–8)
- Jim Steinman – production (tracks 1 and 5)

Additional musicians (Note: The additional members who took part in the recording sessions are not credited in the album's liner notes. They are listed based on the band members' and producers' accounts of the sessions.)

- Eddie Martinez – guitar (track 5)
- New York Choral Society – choral vocals (tracks 1 and 5)

== Charts ==
Chart performance for Floodland
Chart (1987–1988)	Peak position
Canada Top Albums/CDs (RPM)	78
European Albums (Music & Media)	33
German Albums (Offizielle Top 100)	32
New Zealand Albums (RMNZ)	28
Swedish Albums (Sverigetopplistan)	28
Swiss Albums (Schweizer Hitparade)	24
UK Albums (Official Charts)	9
US Billboard 200	101

== Certification ==
Certifications for Floodland
Region	Certification	Certified units/sales
Germany (BVMI)	Gold	250,000^{^}
United Kingdom (BPI)	Gold	100,000^{^}
^{^} Shipments figures based on certification alone.
