= The Sisterhood (gothic rock band) =

English musical project

- Genres: Dark wave; EBM; gothic rock; post-punk
- Years active: 1985–1986
- Label: Merciful Release
- Spinoff of: The Sisters of Mercy
- Past members: Andrew Eldritch; Patricia Morrison; Lucas Fox; James Ray; Alan Vega

The Sisterhood was a musical project led by the English singer, songwriter and musician Andrew Eldritch. With guest musicians, the Sisterhood recorded songs he had originally intended for a second studio album by the Sisters of Mercy.

== Background ==
After the March 1985 release of the first Sisters of Mercy album First and Last and Always the band prepared themselves for a follow-up. Eldritch: "The next Sisters album was going to be called 'Left On Mission and Revenge'."

Singer Andrew Eldritch saw the time ripe for a change of direction: "I always wanted to do something different, because whatever we did it all eventually sounded the same." "I wanted to find out how to record songs without any rock structures and especially without guitars."

Together with guitarist Wayne Hussey, Eldritch went to Hamburg-Bramfeld during August and September 1985 to compose new material. Wayne Hussey: "I went to Hamburg for a month with Andrew to try and write songs for the second Sisters album, and we came back with all my ideas rejected and Andrew's very skeletal." "Andrew rejected all my songs and let me work on one single chord all the time: 'Here's my song – E minor!"

Back in England the band came together for rehearsals in October 1985, but the musical differences had become irreconcilable. Wayne Hussey: "We got to doing the second album and Andrew said 'I'm not singing any of your songs.'" Eldritch: "Then they said 'Well, okay, what are we gonna do for new songs?' And I said 'How about this, this and this' and, unfortunately, the first 'this' I cited had too many chords per minute and Craig said 'If that's the guitar line, I'm not playing it' and walked out. That was really that." "The others didn't want to play my new songs, such as 'Torch' for instance. [...] The song has some unusual chord changes. Craig thought it was crap, he said 'I'm not playing it, I'm going home.' And there he stayed."

Hussey: "Craig walked out of rehearsal and a day later I did."

The music press reported the break-up of the band on Saturday, 2 November 1985: "The Sisters of Mercy were down to singer Andrew Eldritch and his faithful drum machine Doktor Avalanche this week after guitarist Wayne Hussey and bassist Craig Adams left the band. Although this has scuppered recording plans for a new album this month, Andrew now intends to record the same album in the New Year and could well be using Wayne as a session guitarist. The split was described as 'friendly' by a Merciful Release spokesperson. 'The cliché of musical differences would not be inappropriate. Wayne and Craig were unable to comprehend the direction the band was going.' Andrew has also approached former Gun Club bassist Patricia Morrison – now in Fur Bible – to play on the album, but it's not yet known whether Andrew will continue with the name Sisters of Mercy. Wayne and Craig are now reported to be getting their own band together."

Andrew Eldritch: "The people that are now the Mission and myself had an agreement, no one would use the name when the band went its separate ways." "The band was good and successful, each of us could continue. The split came at a time when it wouldn't do us any damage."

== "Giving Ground" single (January 1986) ==
"Giving Ground"

Single by The Sisterhood

from the album Gift
- Released: January 1986
- Genre: Gothic rock
- Label: Merciful Release
- Songwriters: Andrew Eldritch, Boyd Steemson
- Producers: Andrew Eldritch, Lucas Fox

On that very same day of the split, Eldritch made a phone call to bassist Patricia Morrison, whose band Fur Bible was on a UK tour with Siouxsie and the Banshees at the time, and asked her to play on his planned album. Morrison: "The day they fell apart he called me and said 'Will you do it?' and I said yes. [...] We had some tours set up, so I waited until that was cleared, then left."

Hussey and Adams, who like Eldritch remained under contract with WEA Records, booked studio time at Slaughterhouse Recording Studios in Driffield at the end of October 1985, recorded a four-song demo tape, and set up a new band. But the demo tape was rejected by the record company who were not convinced by Hussey's singing talents.

Eldritch went into the studio at the tail end of 1985 to produce the debut single of James Ray and the Performance for his Merciful Release label. James Ray: "The Sisterhood project arose during the recording of 'Mexico Sundown Blues'."

While Eldritch was in the studio, Hussey and Adams, who had taken over the Sisters' roadcrew and equipment, announced their debut concert for 20 January 1986, which they were going to play under the new name the Sisterhood.

Eldritch was alarmed: "They began to claim rights to [the Sisters name], which patently had to be stopped. And when they wanted to be called the Sisterhood, there was nothing I could do but be the Sisterhood before them – the only way to kill that name was to use it, then kill it." "Warners thought they could have two bands on the same label with pretty much the same name."

Eldritch decided to secure the rights to the Sisterhood name as quickly as possible. He registered a company under the name and prepared a record to be released on his own label.

In only five days Eldritch recorded a song called "Giving Ground," which he co-wrote with Merciful Release manager Boyd Steemson and co-produced with Lucas Fox. Fox and Eldritch had met in the spring of 1985, when Fox was the stand-in drummer for Australian support band the Scientists on the Sisters of Mercy's UK tour. Eldritch recorded all instruments himself (guitar, bass, synthesizers and drum programming), while Fox programmed some additional percussion tracks.

The single contained two different mixes of the song, Eldritch's original instrumental "Giving Ground (AV)" (5:45 min) on the b-side and the vocal remix "Giving Ground (RSV)" (4:50 min) on the a-side. 'AV' and 'RSV' are explained on the official Sisters of Mercy website this way: "The 'Authorised Version' of 'Giving Ground' is Andrew's original version, and the 'Revised Standard Version' is the version developed by colleagues at Merciful Release and subsequently adopted as the standard version. 'AV' and 'RSV' are well-known versions of the Bible."

Because Eldritch, as an artist, was under contract to WEA Records, he could not sing on the record, otherwise WEA would have had an option on the recording. James Ray: "He asked me and I did the vocals, as easy as that".

Merciful Release avertised the single's release with a press statement: "From among the forces allied to Merciful Release we bring you the Sisterhood, capturing (in this instance) the musical bile of Andrew Eldritch, and introducing James Ray and the Performance ... of whom more soon."

The single was released as planned on 20 January 1986, the same day that Hussey and Adams played their debut concert in London as the Sisterhood. The press hype about the two conflicting parties made the single enter the UK Indie Chart on 8 February, where it got to no. 1 on 15 February 1986. The reviews in the music press were unanimously negative, and even James Ray later declared: "It's a terrible track."

Hussey and Adams had to give up the Sisterhood name. A radio session for the Janice Long Evening Show on BBC Radio 1 on 10 February was broadcast under the provisional name of the Wayne Hussey and Craig Adams Band, and at the end of February 1986 they adopted the new name The Mission.

Another Eldritch press release commented: "We assume that their choice of name is entirely unconnected with the forthcoming Andrew Eldritch album that for some months has had the working title Left on Mission and Revenge."

On 2 March 1986 the Mission played in Birmingham. Wayne Hussey: "The majority of the songs we've been doing in the set so far are my songs that Andrew rejected for the Sisters' second album. It's ironic cos he saw us at Birmingham and told us how good he thought the songs were."

== "This Corrosion" 12 inch EP (spring 1986, unreleased) ==
Sounds reported on 20 February 1986 that "a new 12-inch EP called 'This Corrosion' will soon be in the shops, featuring the same line-up but with the addition of a mysterious and so far undisclosed American vocalist." This 12 inch single even appeared in German music paper adverts as "available soon".

James Ray: "So during the recording of ['Mexico Sundown Blues'] we made and released 'Giving Ground'. We then spent weeks on what was to be the Sisterhood's second single, 'This Corrosion', but Eldritch decided he was going to use it to kickstart the Sisters Mk II."

Recording took place at Fairview Studios near Hull with in-house engineer John Spence. American vocalist Alan Vega, who had made friends with the Sisters of Mercy in 1983, and undertook a solo tour through the UK and Europe during February and March 1986, recorded one version of the song, other vocal takes featuring James Ray and Andrew Eldritch are in existence as well.

The projected 12 inch EP remained unreleased, instead the song "This Corrosion" in 1987 became the Sisters of Mercy's comeback single.

== Gift album (July 1986) ==
Gift

Studio album by The Sisterhood
- Released: 1986
- Recorded: 1986
- Genres: Dark wave; EBM; proto-techno
- Length: 38:46
- Label: Merciful Release / RCA Music Ltd / Candelmaesse
- Producer: Andrew Eldritch

Singles from Gift
- 1. "Giving Ground" Released: 1986

In March 1986, the Mission began negotiations with Phonogram Ltd. as WEA Records refused to release any material. So the band released the October 1985 demo tape in slightly re-recorded form as an independent single on 9 May 1986. The single (its b-side was titled "Wake (RSV)" as a nod to "Giving Ground (RSV)") promptly entered the UK Indie Chart at no. 1. WEA Records had to release the Mission from their contract.

Both Andrew Eldritch and the Mission still had a publishing contract with RCA Records from their days in the Sisters of Mercy. A sum of £25,000 for one studio album was payable for the year of 1986 in an Advance against royalties deal, so RCA decided to split up the money to the two concerned parties.

Eldritch decided to claim the whole sum for himself by being first to compose, produce and release a studio album, much in the same way as he did with the "Giving Ground" single. Again he did not appear as a vocalist, so he could release the album on his own label without having to offer it to WEA Records: "They thought it was great that I called myself the Sisterhood while they still had the Sisters of Mercy, so they didn't have to back me at all. I had to put out the album on Merciful Release, but it gave me free rein."

Eldritch and Lucas Fox returned to Fairview Studios. Merciful Release office manager Boyd Steemson: "Basically, we had some extra tracks around, so Andrew quickly put some songs together."

James Ray: "I wasn't involved too much with the album, as it was taking ages for Eldritch to formulate any concrete ideas, and I wanted to be writing my own stuff. I personally think the album transpired to cash in on the sales of the single." "Giving Ground" was included as an extended remix on the album, the only track featuring James Ray. James Ray: "Lucas Fox done the spoken word stuff." "If I remember correctly I advised Andrew on how Lucas Fox should approach his vocals and that was quite enough for me."

Lucas Fox does the vocal parts on "Colours", "Finland Red, Egypt White" and "Rain from Heaven". The text of "Finland Red, Egypt White" comes from an arms dealer's catalogue for the AK-47 rifle, while the title cites the country code for blank cartridges. James Ray remembers Norman Cook (a.k.a. Fatboy Slim), then bassist of the Housemartins, having done a mix of the track that remains unreleased. "Rain from Heaven" with its choral singing seems to have been one of the tracks Eldritch intended for the Left on Mission and Revenge album, as he later mentioned how "Wayne and Craig had said those choral singings were insane."8

Patricia Morrison got her first opportunity to collaborate with Eldritch, but her only verified contribution to the album is the spoken passage on the opening track "Jihad". Eldritch: "So I asked Patricia to come to the studio and told her: 'Speak this – Two-Five-Zero-Zero-Zero'. It took the Mission two months to realise the meaning of those words. Two months!" i.e. £25,000.

Alan Vega gets a credit on the album cover but it remains unknown whether he made any contributions to the recording. He was possibly part of the "Chorus of Vengeance" on the track "Rain from Heaven".

In July 1986 Eldritch put the album out on his Merciful Release label to unanimously negative press reactions. The album did not accomplish its purpose, as RCA Records dissolved the publishing contract with Eldritch and decided to keep the Mission instead.

Tony Perrin, the Mission's manager: "I think Eldritch perpetuated it longer than anyone else bothered. We'd still get letters from his lawyers ages after but nothing would ever come of it. The whole thing cost us legal bills and that's all, the rumours about big losses by us were all rubbish, it was never going to court."

Andrew Eldritch later said about the album: "The Sisterhood album was a weapon in this corporate war. That's why I called it Gift. [in German: poison] [...] But I still like the record. It's weird but it's fine." "I see it as a techno record. Or what I thought to be techno at the time."

The official Sisters of Mercy website comments: "The Sisterhood album has become a classic; it parallelled the New Beat of the Continental avant-garde that eventually spawned Techno."

=== Album track list ===
All tracks are written by Andrew Eldritch.

No.	Title	Length
1.	"Jihad"	8:16
2.	"Colours"	8:02
3.	"Giving Ground"	7:30
4.	"Finland Red, Egypt White"	8:16
5.	"Rain From Heaven"	6:42
Total length:		38:46

=== Album CD & LP releases ===
- On 1 August 1989 Gift was released on CD for the first time.
- On 16 May 1994 the Gift CD was re-released in Germany.
- In 20 January 2023 Gift was released on CD, Clear vinyl LP and music cassette on Cadiz Music licensed from The Sisters Of Mercy/Merciful Release
- In 08 March 2024 Gift was released on Silver vinyl LP on Cadiz Music licensed from The Sisters Of Mercy/Merciful Release
- In 01 November 2024 Gift was released on Gold vinyl LP on Cadiz Music licensed from The Sisters Of Mercy/Merciful Release

=== Album trivia ===
The final episode of BBC drama Spooks' seventh series referenced this album. The Russian code broadcast on a Cold War number station is "2.5.0.0.2.5. Finland Red, Egypt White. It is twice blest. It is twice blest. Rain from Heaven". This code activates a Russian sleeper agent in Faversham (also a reference to the Sisters of Mercy as the Faversham is a pub in Leeds that "was where goth's dark lords, the Sisters of Mercy, would hold court"), Kent to collect a hidden portable nuclear weapon to be taken to Grosvenor Square in London and detonated at 15:00hrs. Also, while trying to get to London Bridge through an unused underground tube tunnel, Lucas North says the sentence "What is lost can never be found"; a line from the "Giving Ground" track.

The 2009 song "Soothsayer" by The Gray Kid samples the main riff from "Giving Ground" and was featured in the 2012 film The Brass Teapot.
