= Doctor Jeep =

Single by the Sisters of Mercy

from the album Vision Thing
- B-side: "Knockin' on Heaven's Door"
- Released: December 1990
- Genre: Hard rock, post-punk
- Label: Merciful Release/EastWest
- Songwriters: Andreas Bruhn, Andrew Eldritch
- Producer: Andrew Eldritch

The Sisters of Mercy singles chronology
"More" (1990)	"Doctor Jeep" (1990)	"When You Don't See Me" (1991)

"Doctor Jeep" is a song by the Sisters of Mercy, from their album Vision Thing. It was the second single from the album and was later included on their greatest hits compilation, A Slight Case of Overbombing. The single reached no. 37 on the UK Singles Chart in December 1990.

== Critical reception ==
In review of 5 January 1991 Paul Elliott of Sounds called this song "an inexorable, Olympian noise close to nine minutes of skeletal metal riffing, frosted with keys, Eldritch slurring about everything and nothing" and expressed an opinion that it "won't sound" on radio programmes of Dave Lee Travis.

== Track listing ==
- "Doctor Jeep" written by Andreas Bruhn and Andrew Eldritch, "Knockin' on Heaven's Door" written by Bob Dylan.

=== 7-inch: Merciful Release / MR51 ===
No.	Title	Length
1.	"Doctor Jeep"	4:15
2.	"Knockin' on Heaven's Door (live bootleg recording)"	6:53

=== 12-inch: Merciful Release / MR51T ===
No.	Title	Length
1.	"Doctor Jeep (extended version)"	8:54
2.	"Knockin' on Heaven's Door (live bootleg recording)"	6:52

=== 12-inch Limited: Merciful Release / MR51TX ===
No.	Title	Length
1.	"Doctor Jeep (extended version)"	8:54
2.	"Burn (Live Bootleg Recording)"	3:35
3.	"Amphetamine Logic" (Live Bootleg Recording)"	4:18

=== CD: Merciful Release / MR51CD ===
No.	Title	Length
1.	"Doctor Jeep (radio edit)"	3:03
2.	"Doctor Jeep (extended version)"	8:59
3.	"Knockin' on Heaven's Door (live bootleg recording)"	6:53

== Charts ==
Chart (1990–91)	Peak position
Australia (ARIA)	125
Germany (GfK)	45
UK Singles (OCC)	37
