= Merciful Release =

Record label

Merciful Release is a record label started by Andrew Eldritch, frontman with Leeds band the Sisters of Mercy. As Eldritch stated in an early interview, he wanted to hear himself on the radio. He and Gary Marx (Mark Pairman) played and recorded on the Sisters of Mercy's initial single "Damage Done" and pressed one thousand copies. This record was something of a collector's item.

Throughout the early 1980s, the band released several singles on Merciful Release, controlling the format and image of the records, typically in a black sleeve with artwork centrally mounted and a head and star logo on the rear of sleeves. A notable example of this being Henri Matisse's Blue Nude in gold on black for the single Alice.

By 1984, the band had signed a distribution deal with Warner Bros. Records (Elektra in the US) whilst still maintaining control of Merciful Release.

In the 1990s, a number of CDs were released on the Merciful Release label for the MK Ultra: their Beluga Pop and This Is This albums, and German band Scoda Blush.

== List of releases ==
Date:	Group:	Title:	Type:	Comments:
??/80	The Sisters of Mercy	The Damage Done	7-inch EP	1000x only, deleted
04/82	The Sisters of Mercy	Body Electric	7-inch single	deleted
08/82	The March Violets	Religious As Hell	7-inch single	
11/82	The Sisters of Mercy	Alice	7-inch single	
01/83	The March Violets	Grooving in Green	7-inch single	
03/83	The Sisters of Mercy	Anaconda	7-inch single	
03/83	The Sisters of Mercy	Alice re-release	12-inch single	
05/83	The Sisters of Mercy	The Reptile House EP	12-inch EP	
07/83	Salvation	Girlsoul	7-inch single	
07/83	Salvation	Girlsoul	12-inch single	
10/83	The Sisters of Mercy	Temple of Love	7-inch single	
10/83	The Sisters of Mercy	Temple of Love	12-inch single	
06/84	The Sisters of Mercy	Body And Soul	7-inch single	
06/84	The Sisters of Mercy	Body And Soul	12-inch single	
Unreleased	Salvation	Clash of Dreams	12-inch LP	Issued on CD in 2015 in expanded edition
10/84	The Sisters of Mercy	Walk Away	7-inch single	
10/84	The Sisters of Mercy	Walk Away	12-inch single	contains limited edition flexible 7-inch single
02/85	The Sisters of Mercy	No Time To Cry	7-inch single	
02/85	The Sisters of Mercy	No Time To Cry	12-inch single	
03/85	The Sisters of Mercy	First And Last And Always	12-inch LP	
03/85	The Sisters of Mercy	First And Last And Always	Cassette	
01/86	The Sisterhood	Giving Ground	7-inch single	
06/86	The Sisterhood	Gift	12-inch LP	
07/86	James Ray and the Performance	Mexico Sundown Blues	12-inch LP	
07/86	James Ray and the Performance	Mexico Sundown Blues	7-inch radio promo	
06/87	James Ray and the Performance	Texas	7-inch single	
06/87	James Ray and the Performance	Texas	12-inch single	
09/87	The Sisters of Mercy	This Corrosion	7-inch single	
09/87	The Sisters of Mercy	This Corrosion	12-inch single	
09/87	The Sisters of Mercy	This Corrosion	cassette	
09/87	The Sisters of Mercy	This Corrosion	CD-single	
09/87	The Sisters of Mercy	This Corrosion	7-inch boxed set	
11/87	The Sisters of Mercy	Floodland	12-inch LP	
11/87	The Sisters of Mercy	Floodland	Cassette	
11/87	The Sisters of Mercy	Floodland	CD	
02/88	The Sisters of Mercy	Dominion	7-inch single	
02/88	The Sisters of Mercy	Dominion	12-inch single	
02/88	The Sisters of Mercy	Dominion	CD-single	
02/88	The Sisters of Mercy	Dominion	Cassette box set	
02/88	The Sisters of Mercy	Dominion	12-inch box set	
06/88	The Sisters of Mercy	Lucretia My Reflection	7-inch single	
06/88	The Sisters of Mercy	Lucretia My Reflection	12-inch single	
06/88	The Sisters of Mercy	Lucretia My Reflection	CD-single	
??/88	The Sisters of Mercy	First And Last And Always	CD Album	
10/89	James Ray and the Performance	Dust Boat	7-inch single	
??/89	James Ray and the Performance	A New Kind of Assassin	CD Album	
??/90	James Ray's Gangwar	Another Million Dollars	12-inch single	
??/90	James Ray's Gangwar	Without Conscience	7-inch single	
??/90	James Ray's Gangwar	Without Conscience	12-inch single	
??/90	James Ray's Gangwar	Without Conscience	CD-single	
10/90	The Sisters of Mercy	More	7-inch single	
10/90	The Sisters of Mercy	More	12-inch single	
10/90	The Sisters of Mercy	More	CD-single	
10/90	The Sisters of Mercy	More	CD-single	12-inch gatefold cover 5000x
10/90	The Sisters of Mercy	Vision Thing	12-inch LP	
10/90	The Sisters of Mercy	Vision Thing	Cassette	
10/90	The Sisters of Mercy	Vision Thing	CD Album	
10/90	The Sisters of Mercy	Vision Thing	CD Album	lim. ed. 10000x
12/90	The Sisters of Mercy	Doctor Jeep	7-inch single	
12/90	The Sisters of Mercy	Doctor Jeep	12-inch single	
12/90	The Sisters of Mercy	Doctor Jeep	CD-single	
12/90	The Sisters of Mercy	Doctor Jeep	12-inch single	lim. ed. 5000x
02/91	The Sisters of Mercy	When You Don't See Me	7-inch single	
02/91	The Sisters of Mercy	When You Don't See Me	12-inch single	
02/91	The Sisters of Mercy	When You Don't See Me	CD-single	
02/91	The Sisters of Mercy	When You Don't See Me	12-inch single	lim. ed. 5000x
04/92	The Sisters of Mercy	Temple of Love (1992)	7-inch single	
04/92	The Sisters of Mercy	Temple of Love (1992)	12-inch single	
04/92	The Sisters of Mercy	Temple of Love (1992)	12-inch single	limited edition
04/92	The Sisters of Mercy	Temple of Love (1992)	CD-single	
04/92	The Sisters of Mercy	Temple of Love (1992)	CD-single	limited edition
04/92	The Sisters of Mercy	Some Girls Wander By Mistake	12-inch LP	
04/92	The Sisters of Mercy	Some Girls Wander By Mistake	Cassette	
04/92	The Sisters of Mercy	Some Girls Wander By Mistake	CD Album	
04/92	The Sisters of Mercy	Some Girls Wander By Mistake	CD Album	numbered lim. ed. of 500
/92	The Sisters of Mercy	First And Last And Always	CD	digitally remastered
??/92	James Ray's Gangwar	Dios Esta De Nuestro Lado	CD Album	(tr: God Is on Our Side)
??/93	The Sisters of Mercy	Under The Gun	7-inch single	
??/93	The Sisters of Mercy	Under The Gun	12-inch single	
??/93	The Sisters of Mercy	Under The Gun	CD-single	
??/93	The Sisters of Mercy	Under The Gun	CD-single lim. ed.	
??/93	The Sisters of Mercy	A Slight Case of Overbombing	12-inch double-LP	
??/93	The Sisters of Mercy	A Slight Case of Overbombing	Cassette	
??/93	The Sisters of Mercy	A Slight Case of Overbombing	CD Album	
16 May 1994	La Costa Rasa	Autopilot	CD	
??/94	The MK Ultra	This Is This	CD	The MK Ultra is another James Ray incarnation
??/95	The MK Ultra	Beluga Pop	CD	
01/98	Scoda Blush	Little Late	CD	

== See also ==
- Lists of record labels
