= Some Girls Wander by Mistake =

Compilation album by the Sisters of Mercy
- Released: 27 April 1992
- Recorded: 1980–1984
- Genres: Gothic rock; dark wave; synth punk
- Length: 79:31
- Labels: Merciful Release; East West
- Producers: Andrew Eldritch; John Ashton

The Sisters of Mercy chronology
Vision Thing (1990)	Some Girls Wander by Mistake (1992)	A Slight Case of Overbombing (1993)

Some Girls Wander by Mistake is a compilation album by English band the Sisters of Mercy, released on 27 April 1992 on their own label Merciful Release, distributed by East West/Warner Music UK.

The album collected the complete and unedited studio recording work of the band from 1980 to 1983: their first six singles and EPs, "The Damage Done", "Body Electric", "Anaconda", Alice, The Reptile House, and the 12-inch edition of "Temple of Love". The 2017 release includes two alternate mixes of "Under the Gun": Metropolis mix and Jutland mix, originally released in 1993 on the 12-inch vinyl of "Under the Gun".

== Background ==
"Temple of Love" is the only song from the 1980–1983 time period that was published with an "extended version". The album does not contain the 7-inch version of the song, which is the same as the extended version but faded out halfway. Although "Temple of Love" was re-recorded in 1992 to promote the compilation album's release, the new version was not initially included on the album. "Temple of Love (1992)" featured Israeli vocalist Ofra Haza.

The compilation includes cover versions of "1969", originally recorded by the Stooges, and "Gimme Shelter", originally recorded by the Rolling Stones, which appeared on the Alice and Temple of Love 12 inch EPs, respectively.

The album title derived from the Leonard Cohen song "Teachers", from the 1967 album Songs of Leonard Cohen, which was a staple live cover for the band throughout its career. The full line is: "Some girls wander by mistake / Into the mess that scalpels make". Songs of Leonard Cohen also included the Cohen song "Sisters of Mercy", which provided the band's name.

== Release and reception ==
The album was issued as a limited-edition CD with artwork "postcards" of the early vinyl singles, and as a regular CD without such cards.

Professional ratings
Review scores
Source	Rating
AllMusic	4.5/5 stars
Q	3/5 stars
Raw	2/5 stars

== Track listing ==
No.	Title	Writer(s)	Original EP/single	Length
1.	"Alice"	Eldritch	Alice 12″ EP (Mar '83)	3:34
2.	"Floorshow"	Eldritch, Craig Adams, Gary Marx	Alice 12″ EP (Mar '83)	3:40
3.	"Phantom"	Adams, Marx	Alice 12″ EP (Mar '83)	7:10
4.	"1969"	James Osterberg (Iggy Pop), Dave Alexander, Asheton, Asheton	Alice 12″ EP (Mar '83)	2:45
5.	"Kiss the Carpet"	Eldritch	The Reptile House E.P. (May '83)	5:55
6.	"Lights"	Eldritch	The Reptile House E.P. (May '83)	5:51
7.	"Valentine"	Eldritch	The Reptile House E.P. (May '83)	4:44
8.	"Fix"		The Reptile House E.P. (May '83)	3:41
9.	"Burn"	Eldritch	The Reptile House E.P. (May '83)	4:49
10.	"Kiss the Carpet (Reprise)"	Eldritch	The Reptile House E.P. (May '83)	0:36
11.	"Temple of Love (Extended Version)"	Eldritch	"Temple of Love" 12″ EP (Oct '83)	7:42
12.	"Heartland"	Eldritch, Marx	"Temple of Love" 12″ EP (Oct '83)	4:47
13.	"Gimme Shelter"	Mick Jagger, Keith Richards	"Temple of Love" 12″ EP (Oct '83)	5:57
14.	"The Damage Done"	Eldritch, Marx	"The Damage Done" 7″ (Nov '80)	3:03
15.	"Watch"	Marx	"The Damage Done" 7″ (Nov '80)	3:11
16.	"Home of the Hit-Men"	Marx	"The Damage Done" 7″ (Nov '80)	0:34
17.	"Body Electric"	Eldritch	"Body Electric" 7″ (Apr '82)	4:18
18.	"Adrenochrome"	Eldritch	"Body Electric" 7″ (Apr '82)	2:57
19.	"Anaconda"	Eldritch, Marx	"Anaconda" 7″ (Mar '83)	4:06
Total length:				79:31

The B-side to "Anaconda" was "Phantom", previously made available on the "Alice" EP. Digital versions of the album feature the extended version of "Temple of Love (1992)", in addition to or replacing the original extended version.

2017 bonus tracks

No.	Title	Original EP/single	Length
20.	"Temple of Love (1992)"	"Temple of Love" 12″ (1992)	8:08
21.	"Vision Thing (Canadian Club Remix)"	"Temple of Love" 12″ (1992)	7:34
22.	"Under the Gun (Metropolis Mix)"	"Under the Gun" 12″	6:18
23.	"Alice (1993)"	"Under the Gun" 12″	4:00
24.	"Under the Gun (Jutland Mix)"	"Under the Gun" 12″	6:19

== Personnel ==
Tracks 1–13, 17–19

- Andrew Eldritch – vocals
- Craig Adams – bass guitar
- Ben Gunn – guitar
- Gary Marx – guitar
- Doktor Avalanche (drum machine) – drums

Track 14–16

- Andrew Eldritch – vocals (lead on 14), guitar, drums
- Gary Marx – vocals (lead on 15 and 16), guitar

== Charts ==
=== Weekly charts ===
Weekly chart performance for Some Girls Wander by Mistake
Chart (1992)	Peak position
Australian Albums (ARIA)	98
Austrian Albums (Ö3 Austria)	7
Canada Top Albums/CDs (RPM)	75
European Albums (Music & Media)	25
German Albums (Offizielle Top 100)	9
New Zealand Albums (RMNZ)	27
Swedish Albums (Sverigetopplistan)	17
Swiss Albums (Schweizer Hitparade)	22
UK Albums (Official Charts)	5

=== Year-end charts ===
Year-end chart performance for Some Girls Wander by Mistake
Chart (1992)	Position
German Albums (Offizielle Top 100)	44

== Certifications ==
Certifications for Some Girls Wander by Mistake
Region	Certification	Certified units/sales
Germany (BVMI)	Gold	250,000^{^}
United Kingdom (BPI)	Silver	60,000^{^}
^{^} Shipments figures based on certification alone.
