= Publishing contract =

Legal contract between a publisher and a writer or author

A publishing contract is a legal contract between a publisher and a writer or author (or more than one), to publish original content by the writer(s) or author(s). This may involve a single written work, or a series of works.

In the case of music publishing, the emphasis is not on printed or recorded works. It usually refers to the promotion of a musical composition, or its referral to a suitable recording artist. A music publisher who does produce (or contract to issue) sheet music is known as a music print publisher. It can be used by authors, journalists, and others to promote their works.

== Book publishing agreements ==
Some of the most essential clauses of a standard (boilerplate) book publishing contract are: Grant of Rights, Subsidiary Rights, Delivery and Acceptance, Publication, Copyright, Advance (if there is any), Royalties, and Out of Print. All of them should be taken seriously by authors since trade publishing contracts are not covered in the United States by statutory requirements for fairness and may contain vague language, biased terms, and hidden future pitfalls. In the U.K., the Contracts Act of 1999, the Digital Economy Act 2010, and the Enterprise and Regulatory Reform Act of 2013 opened the door to revisions of the established practices in the area of publishing contracts which are currently underway.

The key to a good contract is clarity. Ambiguity and inconsistency are the two key ingredients in litigation soup. Formal agreements are essential. Under copyright law, without a written agreement signed by the author, the publisher does not control exclusive rights. If a dispute arises, a well-drafted contract will anticipate such a dispute and could save you thousands of dollars in legal fees later on. Keep in mind that you are negotiating a very long term relationship. If the book is successful, the publisher and author (or authors heirs) could be bound together for the life of the copyright. For works published after 1977, copyright lasts for life of the author plus another seventy years.

== Types of music publishing agreements ==
It is important for music authors, producers and publishers to understand the legal rights associated with publishing contracts. The common music publishing contracts are:

=== Single song agreement ===
A single song deal is an agreement between the writer and the music publisher in which the writer grants certain rights to a publisher for one or more songs. In single song deals, the writer is paid a one-time recoupable advance.

=== Exclusive song writer agreement ===
An exclusive song writer agreement ("ESWA," "publishing deal," or "staff writer" contract), the songwriter generally grants all of the songwriter's share of the income to the music publisher. The writer's services are exclusive to the music publishers for a specified period of time. Thus, any compositions written within that period belong to the music publisher. These deals are usually offered to writers with some degree of success. Because the writer has a track record of writing hits, the publisher feels confident that it will recoup its investment. In return for signing away exclusive rights to some or all the writer's songs, the writer gets paid by the publisher a negotiated advance against future royalties. The advance amount naturally depends on the writer's bargaining power and on the competition in the marketplace, if any. Under a staff writer deal, the writer is paid on a weekly or quarterly basis. An ESWA can be either tied to a record contract, or independent of a record contract.

=== Co-publishing agreement ===
The co-publishing ("co-pub") deal is perhaps the most common publishing agreement. Under this deal, the songwriter and the music publisher are "co-owners" of the copyrights in the musical compositions. The writer becomes the "co-publisher" (i.e. co-owner) with the music publisher based on an agreed split of the royalties. The songwriter assigns an agreed percentage to the publisher, usually (but not always), a 50/50 split. Thus, the writer conveys _ of the publisher's share to the publisher, but retains all of writer's share. In a typical "75/25 co-pub deal," the writer gets 100% of the songwriter's share, and 50% of the publisher's share, or 75% of the entire copyrights, with the remaining 25% going to the publisher. Thus, when royalties are due and payable, the writer/co-publisher will receive 75% of the income, while the publisher will retain 25%.

=== Administration agreement ===
An administrative agreement ("admin") takes place between a songwriter/publisher and an independent administrator, or between a writer/publisher and another music publisher. In an "admin deal," the songwriter self-publishes and merely licenses songs to the music publisher for a term of years and for an agreed royalty split. Under this agreement, the music publisher simply administers and exploits the copyrights for another publisher/copyright owner. Only the most popular songwriters can even consider asking for an admin deal. Under this arrangement, ownership of the copyright is usually not transferred to the administrator. Instead, the music publisher gets 10-20% of the gross royalties received from administering and exploiting the songs for a certain period of time and for a certain territory.

=== Collection agreement ===
A collection agreement is similar to an admin deal where the writer retains the copyrights, except that the publisher does not perform exploitation functions. Like an accountant or business manager, it merely collects and disburses available royalty income.

=== Sub-publishing agreement ===
These are music publishing deals in foreign territories between US and foreign publishers. They are like admin or collection deals (with no ownership of the copyrights being transferred to the sub publisher), but limited to one or more countries outside the US. Under this publishing deal, the publisher allows the sub publisher to act on its behalf in certain foreign territories. Often, they are limited to a group of countries, such as European Union (EU), DACH (Germany, Austria, Switzerland), Latin America, etc.

=== Purchase agreement ===
Under this agreement, one music publisher acquires in whole or in part the catalog of another music publisher, somewhat like a merger of companies. In this case, a "due diligence" investigation is done to determine the value of the catalogue.

=== Meetings ===
Meetings are then often arranged to discuss the book. The agreements can often be about the percentage of the money that the publishers get. Factual MOTs are sometimes set up to bind the LASDs.

== See also ==
- Publishing
- Music publisher (popular music)
