= Alice (The Sisters of Mercy song) =

Single by The Sisters of Mercy
- B-side: "Floorshow"
- Released: 21 November 1982
- Genre: Gothic rock; post-punk
- Length: 3:35
- Label: Merciful Release
- Songwriter: Andrew Eldritch
- Producer: John Ashton

The Sisters of Mercy singles chronology
"Body Electric" (1982)	"Alice" (1982)	"Anaconda" (1983)

"Alice" is a song by the British rock band the Sisters of Mercy, written by vocalist Andrew Eldritch. The song was released as a non-album single by the band's own label by Merciful Release, on 21 November 1982. It was re-released in March 1983 as a 12" EP.

== Recording ==
After one week of pre-production at Andrew Eldritch's flat in Leeds, four tracks were recorded over two weekends with producer John Ashton of the Psychedelic Furs at Kenny Giles's studio in Bridlington: "Alice", "Floorshow", Stooges cover "1969" and the unreleased "Good Things". The same four songs had been previously recorded for a BBC radio session in August 1982.

"Alice" and "Floorshow" were released as the band's third 7" single on 21 November 1982.

== Alice (EP) ==
Alice

EP by The Sisters of Mercy
- Released: March 1983
- Recorded: 1982
- Genres: Gothic rock; post-punk
- Length: 17:12
- Labels: Merciful Release; Brain Eater
- Producer: John Ashton

The Sisters of Mercy chronology
Alice (1983)	The Reptile House E.P. (1983)

Singles from Alice
- 1. "Alice/Floorshow" Released: November 1982

With two additional tracks, "1969" and the new recording "Phantom", the 12" EP Alice was released in March 1983.

Ashton financed a US release (the band's first) of the 12" EP on Island Park, New York label Brain Eater Records.

The EP was never released as a stand-alone CD, but was included on the Some Girls Wander by Mistake collection.

== Track listing ==
7" single (1982)

No.	Title	Lyrics	Music	Length
1.	"Alice"	Andrew Eldritch	Eldritch	3:35
2.	"Floorshow"	Eldritch	Craig Adams, Eldritch, Gary Marx	3:41

12" EP (1983)

No.	Title	Lyrics	Music	Length
1.	"Alice"	Eldritch	Eldritch	3:35
2.	"Floorshow"	Eldritch	Adams, Eldritch, Marx	3:41
3.	"Phantom"	Instrumental	Adams, Marx	7:11
4.	"1969" (Originally performed by the Stooges)	James Osterberg	Dave Alexander, Ron Asheton, Scott Asheton, Osterberg	2:45

== Personnel ==
- Andrew Eldritch – vocals
- Craig Adams – bass guitar
- Ben Gunn – guitar
- Gary Marx – guitar
- Doktor Avalanche (drum machine) – drums

== Artist commentary ==
- Andrew Eldritch (1990): “My attitude to 'Alice' has changed over the years. I wrote it in ten minutes about pills and tranks when I used to care about watching people I know get dragged down by that. Now I really don't care.”
- Gary Marx (1983/2003): “Ben joined us last year. The first single that we did with him was 'Alice', which was like our break in a very small way, as it got us into the indie charts [...] The Psychedelic Furs put up all the costs so it was no skin off our noses. What happened was, Andy went to see the Furs a long time ago and gave them our first tape, which they liked and gave to various people, including their manager. So we've had a lot of help and advice from them. John Ashton, the Furs' guitarist, produced 'Alice' which was the reason why it was so good. With a bit of luck he might help us with the next one.” “The guitar sound was my old £85 Shergold in the early days, something I’d borrowed off Jon Langford or other friends of the family, or one of Andrew’s guitars [...] We’d made ‘Alice’ with John Ashton producing who did a brilliant job, and rather than invite him to work with us again Andrew believed he’d learnt everything he could from John and took sole responsibility for [the band's follow-up single] ‘Anaconda’.”
- Les Mills (manager, 2004): “I arranged for them to record with John as I felt it would benefit both parties, as the Sisters' previous recorded work had been dire and John wanted to get into production.”
