= Body and Soul (EP) =

EP by The Sisters of Mercy
- Released: 4 June 1984
- Recorded: March 1984
- Genre: Gothic rock, post-punk
- Length: 17:47
- Label: Merciful Release / WEA
- Producer: Andrew Eldritch

The Sisters of Mercy chronology
The Reptile House E.P. (1983)	Body and Soul (1984)	First and Last and Always (1985)

Singles from Body and Soul (EP)
- 1. "Body and Soul" Released: 4 June 1984

Body and Soul is the third EP by the Sisters of Mercy, recorded in March 1984. It was the first release under a distribution contract with WEA, issued on 12" vinyl on 4 June 1984 by Merciful Release, the band's label. The EP was never released on CD, but the title track was included on the A Slight Case of Overbombing collection. All songs are credited to Andrew Eldritch, but according to Wayne Hussey's book Salad Daze, the music to the song Body and Soul was written by Hussey who for contractual reasons didn't get a credit.

== Track listing ==
All music is composed by Andrew Eldritch.

No.	Title	Length
1.	"Body and Soul"	3:28
2.	"Body Electric (1984)"	4:39
3.	"Train"	2:39
4.	"Afterhours"	7:26

== Personnel ==
- Andrew Eldritch - vocals
- Craig Adams - bass guitar
- Wayne Hussey - guitar
- Gary Marx - guitar
- Doktor Avalanche (drum machine) - drums
