= The Reptile House E.P. =

EP by The Sisters of Mercy
- Released: 16 May 1983
- Recorded: 1983
- Genre: Gothic rock; post-punk
- Length: 25:12
- Label: Merciful Release; Brain Eater
- Producer: Andrew Eldritch

The Sisters of Mercy chronology
Alice (1983)	The Reptile House E.P. (1983)	Body and Soul (1984)

The Reptile House E.P. is the second independent EP by the Sisters of Mercy, released on 12" vinyl in May 1983 on the band's own label, Merciful Release. The EP was never released as a stand-alone CD, but was included on the Some Girls Wander by Mistake collection.

The EP was the band's second release in the US, issued by Brain Eater Records (of Island Park, New York) on 10 July 1983. Brain Eater had previously issued the band's "Alice" EP earlier that year. The EP was rereleased on vinyl on April 22, 2023 (Record Store Day).

== Artist's commentary ==
- Andrew Eldritch (1983/92): "I thought 'The Reptile House' was our finest hour yet because it was the most serious record we ever made, but it was also the most perverse. Everything about that record is perverse. It's really slow, it's really long, and I just love the way all the lead lines are hidden in the mix, involved in all the effects, completely submerged, you really have to fight with that record. And the last track starts like it's gonna be a sort of pop number and the voice just slithers back into the mix and the tune distorts itself, and then that's finished you just get a reprise of the beginning which brings you right back full circle. It's a very perverse record. It's part of the concept of the thing, that there's no escape from The Reptile House. But a lot of this does go over people's heads, they just think,'Ah yeah, a long, slow record!'" “On records like 'Reptile House' or 'Temple of Love' they [Gary Marx and Craig Adams] didn't even play. They weren't into recording that much, they just wanted to play live. They were sleeping in some corner until I woke them up after I had played and recorded everything on my own. When they asked me how their guitar and bass parts had turned out, I used to say to them they performed very well. Gary didn't even listen to 'The Reptile House EP' until it had been released on vinyl and I handed it to him with the words, 'This is our new record, you'll like it!'"
- Gary Marx (1983): "The new EP is pretty slow, which is a deliberate move to prove what we're not just a rama-lama punk band."

== Track listing ==
All tracks are written by Andrew Eldritch

The Reptile House track listing
No.	Title	Length
1.	"Kiss the Carpet" (labeled as "Kiss" in the track listing)	5:55
2.	"Lights"	5:51
3.	"Valentine"	4:44
4.	"Fix"	3:41
5.	"Burn"	4:49
6.	"Kiss the Carpet (Reprise)" (omitted from track listing)	0:36

== Personnel ==
- Andrew Eldritch – vocals, guitar
- Craig Adams – bass guitar
- Ben Gunn – guitar
- Gary Marx – guitar
- Doktor Avalanche (drum machine) – drums

== Charts ==
Chart performance for The Reptile House E.P.
Chart (2023)	Peak position
Hungarian Albums (MAHASZ)	28
Scottish Albums (OCC)	87
UK Physical Albums (OCC)	91
