= First and Last and Always =

Studio album by the Sisters of Mercy
- Released: 11 March 1985
- Recorded: June – November 1984
- Studios: Strawberry (Stockport); Genetic (Reading)
- Genre: Gothic rock
- Length: 45:37
- Label: Merciful Release
- Producer: David M. Allen

The Sisters of Mercy chronology
Body and Soul (1984)	First and Last and Always (1985)	Floodland (1987)

Singles from First and Last and Always
- 1. "Walk Away" Released: October 1984; 2. "No Time to Cry" Released: March 1985; 3. "Black Planet" Released: 1985 (US radio single)

First and Last and Always is the debut studio album by English gothic rock band the Sisters of Mercy, first released on 11 March 1985 through the band's Merciful Release label. Prior to recording sessions for a debut album, the band started off by releasing multiple extended plays and singles from 1980 through 1984. Guitarist Ben Gunn departed the band in October 1983 and was subsequently replaced by Dead or Alive member Wayne Hussey. This created one of the band's most iconic line-ups, comprising Hussey with frontman Andrew Eldritch, guitarist Gary Marx, and bassist Craig Adams.

After touring for two months and releasing the single "Body and Soul", recording sessions with producer David M. Allen began at Strawberry Studios in Stockport during June 1984, with sessions also taking place at Genetic Studios in Reading. The sessions were prolonged due to Eldritch's drug use and extended time spent on writing lyrics, though recording was eventually completed in November 1984. As with the band's previous releases they used a drum machine referred to as "Doktor Avalanche", this time being an Oberheim DMX.

First and Last and Always was preceded by the singles "Walk Away" and "No Time to Cry", which peaked at number 45 and number 63, respectively, on the UK Singles Chart. The album peaked at number 14 on the UK Albums Chart, though the band had still been in debt afterward due to the production costs. The costs were recouped in 1988, and the album was certified gold by the British Phonographic Industry in 1989 for selling 100,000 copies in the United Kingdom. The album was later certified gold by the BVMI in 2011 for selling 250,000 copies in Germany.

Although Eldritch and Hussey began writing new material soon after the album's release, the Sisters of Mercy dissolved later in 1985 when Hussey, Marx, and Adams departed the band due to heightened tensions between them and Eldritch. Consequently, First and Last and Always was the only Sisters of Mercy album to feature Hussey, Marx, and Adams. In the aftermath of the disbandment, Hussey and Adams went on to form The Mission, while Eldritch created his side project The Sisterhood, though Eldritch would later restart the Sisters of Mercy with other members.

== Background ==
The band was founded in 1980 by Andrew Eldritch and Gary Marx in Leeds. Up to 1983, they had produced five singles and two EPs, which were released on the band's own indie label Merciful Release and were distributed independently as well. As the band became increasingly successful and featured regularly in the UK Indie Chart, a first studio album was announced in 1983 for the following year. Eldritch estimated the production costs at £40,000, a sum which exceeded the financial capabilities of an indie band. Around the same time talks with interested record labels began. Eldritch, who handled management and business affairs of the band, negotiated with several record companies early in the new year and finally signed a satisfactory contract with WEA Records. Merciful Release opened an office in London and founded its own publishing company Candelmaesse Limited, as well, which licensed the future song material to the publisher of RCA Records, RCA Music Limited.

In October 1983, guitarist Ben Gunn left. At the end of the year, through CBS Records, who were interested in signing the band, he was replaced by former Dead or Alive member Wayne Hussey. The new band line-up played its debut concert on 7 April 1984, which featured the newly written songs "Body and Soul", "Train" and "Walk Away". The gig was followed by a short American tour until 16 April. After returning to the UK, Eldritch wrote a new song called "Wide Receiver", which was inspired by a term in American football and which he recorded on his own at home as a demo. The rudimentary song wasn't used in the end, but Eldritch's solo demo recording appeared in early 1992 on a bootleg album.

At Strawberry Recording Studios in Stockport, the Sisters of Mercy recorded their first single in March 1984 for WEA ("Body and Soul"), which was composed and produced by Eldritch himself and which was released on 4 June 1984. "Body and Soul" peaked at No. 46 on the UK Singles Chart. From 2 May to 6 June, the band toured the UK and Europe and tried out a new Gary Marx composition which he later used in Ghost Dance. Recommended by WEA Records, Cure producer Dave Allen saw the band in Amsterdam (2 June 1984) and later received a telegram by Andrew Eldritch which said: "The Sisters say yes to Dave Allen". After the end of the tour, they began to prepare themselves for the album recordings, but first they entered Maida Vale Studios on 19 June to record a John Peel Session for BBC Radio 1. The session was broadcast on 13 July when the Sisters of Mercy were already in the recording studio.

== Recording ==
=== Demo sessions ===
After intense songwriting sessions, Gary Marx entered Parkside Studios, "a tiny studio in a rehearsal complex off Armley Road where I'd been with Wayne to record some new demos with him singing." The recordings were engineered by Steve Allen. Eldritch was enthusiastic about the new material, and played some instrumental demos to Melody Maker journalist Adam Sweeting: "I think this stuff's gonna be incredible, like nothing we've ever done before".

=== Strawberry sessions ===
At the end of June 1984, the Sisters of Mercy went with producer Dave Allen into the Strawberry Recording Studios in Stockport, near Manchester, for five weeks to record their first studio album. Studio costs were £500 a day and £3,250 a week. Eldritch spent the whole five weeks inside the studio and, according to Dave Allen, used large amounts of amphetamine on a daily basis. In Stockport, backing tracks and vocals were to be recorded. Additional vocals, overdubs and the final mix were planned for August at Genetic Studios. The finished album was to be released in the third week of October 1984. The band immediately started to record, with Hussey and Marx often providing guide vocals with their own lyrics which later showed up on bootlegs. Both Hussey and Marx later used some of these lyrics for their own bands, The Mission and Ghost Dance. An early recording of "First and Last and Always", which, according to Gary Marx, was "previously called 'The Scottish One'", was "completed pretty early on". Marx sang an early draft of the later Ghost Dance lyric of "When I Call", which mentioned the name of a friend of the band's from Hamburg; Marianne.

On "Nine While Nine", which, according to Marx, was "recorded at the same time" and "had the working title 'Child of Light", Gary Marx sang a guide vocal which he reused later for the Ghost Dance song "A Deeper Blue". The title of this song is derived from Yorkshire dialect where "while" is used to mean "until". "Black Planet" exists in the form of an early version with a Wayne Hussey lyric which he later used for the Mission songs "Dance on Glass" and "Naked and Savage". Additional songs which were left unused were the later Mission song "Garden of Delight" and later Ghost Dance song "Yesterday Again". Eldritch later sang his own version of "Garden of Delight" which remained unused as well: "There are a few bootlegs in existence of me trying to sing Wayne's words, and you can hear that I'm not convinced by them. I can't breathe any meaning into them." "The guy didn't have a clue – he'd just string buzz words together."

Recordings were delayed, to the frustration of the band as Eldritch was still working on lyrics. Gary Marx: "He'd got far too caught up in the business and had lost his edge as a writer. We wasted weeks at a time in the studio, waiting for him to come up with a handful of lyrics. It was very painful and very expensive." A notable exception was "Marian". Eldritch, inspired by Gary Marx's original lyrics to "First and Last and Always", wrote new words to a Wayne Hussey composition which contained a few passages sung in German. "'Marian' is a very special song; it's not like any of the other songs. I wrote it in ten minutes, usually the lyrics take me up to half a year." The vocal takes proved to be time-consumingly elaborate. Marx said, "After each session Andy would say, 'But is it epic?', and we'd go, 'Yeah Andy, it's great!' And he'd go back and do it again. Andy's a complete perfectionist." He added, "We could write and record a double album in the time it took him to get the headphone mix to his liking."

At the end of July 1984, recordings were finished and the band had completed raw mixes of 18 songs on ten analogue master reels:

- Reel 1: "Tones"/"No Time to Cry"
- Reel 2: "Emma"/"Walk Away"
- Reel 3: "Poison Door"/"A Rock and a Hard Place"
- Reel 4: "First and Last and Always" (album version)/"First and Last and Always" (Japan version) (Note: Listed under their working titles "Scottish One A" and "Scottish One B")
- Reel 5: "Possession"/"Spit on Your Grave"/"Evil Come Evil Go"
- Reel 6: "Marian" (Note: Listed under its working title "Marianne")/"Wide Receiver"
- Reel 7: "Nine While Nine"
- Reel 8: "Some Kind of Stranger" (Note: Listed under its working title "Little Wing")
- Reel 9: "Some Kind of Stranger" (early) (Note: Listed under its working title "Andy's Little Wing")
- Reel 10: "Down to E....."/"On the Wire"

According to Dave Allen "Tones", "Spit on Your Grave", "Evil Come Evil Go" and "Down to E....." are working titles for known songs. "Amphetamine Logic", according to Gary Marx, had the working title "Horned One Stabs", which indicates that this song was not recorded at Strawberry but at later sessions. In early August 1984, the band flew to the US to play two concerts in New York.

=== Genetic sessions ===
After the US gigs, the band went into Genetic Studios near Reading with producer Dave Allen as planned to complete the album with engineer Tim Baldwin. But the sessions at Genetic Studios dissolved, according to Gary Marx, into "madness of Eldritch walking into walls between vocal takes and us generally losing the plot. [Baldwin] seemed to remember it fondly enough." Weakened by continuous amphetamine use, insomnia, malnutrition and hypoglycaemia, Eldritch collapsed in the studio one night. Marx: "He was completely exhausted; hallucinating. Despite this, part of him still wanted to carry on, although the other part knew that he had to stop because he was so ill." Eldritch: "I enjoy it so much, being strung out for a very long time. I'm told you can't do it for that long." Eldritch was rushed to the nearest hospital where he had to stay for a while because of heart complications and reduced general and nutritional condition. In time for two festival appearances in Germany in early September 1984, Eldritch was released from hospital, but the band couldn't meet the scheduled release date of the album. During an interview in Ahlen on 8 September, Eldritch said the release had been postponed to the beginning of the next year.

The band then returned to Genetic Studios to put the finishing touches on the album. It was possibly at these sessions that the band recorded a studio version of the Bob Dylan song "Knockin' on Heaven's Door"; an indication of the band's black humour. Studio versions of the two later Mission songs, "Serpents Kiss" and "Wake", exist. Wayne Hussey: "Both of these songs were actually first recorded during the sessions for [First and Last and Always], but weren't completed at that time." It's not clear whether these two songs were recorded at Strawberry or at Genetic Studios. On 22 September 1984, the band made an appearance at a festival in York and then went on the Black October tour through the UK and Europe from 4 October till 18 November 1984, which was originally set up to coincide with the release of the album. To coincide with the tour, a first single off the album was released on 8 October 1984, "Walk Away", which included a limited edition flexidisc featuring an "Amphetamix" of the song "Train". With the release schedule disrupted and the album postponed to the next year, the record company unsuccessfully requested to postpone "Walk Away" too. "Walk Away", like its predecessor, failed to reach the UK top 40, reaching No. 45.

After the end of the tour, the band returned to Genetic Studios without bassist Craig Adams or producer Dave Allen to mix the album. On this occasion two new songs were recorded, "Blood Money" and "Bury Me Deep", which were produced by Eldritch and were intended as B-sides for the next single, "No Time to Cry". At the end of 1984, Eldritch also produced the mini-album Clash of Dreams by Salvation at Strawberry Recording Studios in Stockport, which was intended for a March 1985 release on his Merciful Release label. The album was shelved. After the Christmas break, the band spent January and February 1985 with preparations for the album release, which again had been postponed to March. The artwork was completed and delivered, and various tapes with different mixes to pick circulated at the WEA offices. Additionally, the band negotiated the release of a live video on PolyGram which was to be filmed on Gary Marx's birthday on 18 June 1985 at the Royal Albert Hall. Around that time, lead guitarist and band co-founder Gary Marx decided to leave the group. "My relationship to all three of them was completely shattered." "As a songwriter it was a frustrating time in The Sisters. I wrote a lot of songs but they weren't used." It had been presumed that Hussey should switch to keyboards, a step which Hussey would never have tolerated.

== Composition ==
For the album sessions the band had acquired a new drum machine, an Oberheim DMX. The album lyrics were all written by Andrew Eldritch, who said his writing "owes more to collage editing in film". Their content, with various references to drugs and separation, mirror Eldritch's condition at the time: "I was so shot when I wrote the lyrics on the album that there's no distancing of persona at all." Gary Marx: "When we were making [the album] Andrew was effectively splitting with his long-term girlfriend and I was close to leaving the band. [These] two things led to a number of references in the lyrics, which seemed to cover his farewells to us both." Eldritch later confirmed that the lyrics of "Walk Away" were directed to Gary Marx: "I thought one of them in particular might have found it a bit relevant." Gary Marx: "'Walk Away' may or may not be about me; I don't care because I don't particularly like the song. The one lyric which always bugs me is the line from 'Some Kind of Stranger' which says 'careful lingers undecided at the door', which I definitely took as a shot at me."

== Release and aftermath ==
On 8 March 1985, the single "No Time to Cry" was released, reached No. 63 on the UK chart. To coincide with the album release, a UK tour began on 9 March. On 11 March, WEA Records Ltd. released the album in the UK to positive press reactions. On 1 April, Marx played his last concert with The Sisters of Mercy, followed by a TV appearance the day after, during which the band played live in the studio versions of "First and Last and Always" and "Marian". The remaining trio, with Wayne Hussey shouldering all guitar parts, started another tour through Europe and the US on 12 April, which continued till 7 June. A second TV appearance for German TV show Formel Eins, during which the band mimed to "No Time to Cry", was broadcast on 15 April 1985. The Sisters of Mercy played their final concert as planned on 18 June 1985 at the Royal Albert Hall. Gary Marx, who was announced to take part, didn't show up. The video was released in 1986 by PolyGram.

In the summer of 1985, the music press reported that The Sisters of Mercy were planning an ABBA cover version as their next single. Eldritch later confirmed that he had indeed contacted producer Jim Steinman: "I called him up [in 1985] when the band had 'Gimme Gimme Gimme' in their set and told him about the song and that our version had to be absolutely stupid. He agreed with me but he was booked out. And then the band broke up." On 2 November, the music press reported the band's split. Andrew Eldritch: "The people that are now The Mission and myself had an agreement: no one would use the name when the band went its separate ways." "The band was good and successful, each of us could continue. The split came at a time when it wouldn't do us any damage."

=== Editions ===
The original vinyl album was released in March 1985 in the UK, the US and Europe. In July 1985 Warner-Pioneer Corporation in Japan released a version of the album that contained different mixes of some tracks ("Black Planet" features slightly different instrumentation and is 10 seconds longer, "No Time to Cry" features different opening and ending instrumentation and sound effects, "A Rock and a Hard Place" features additional guitar tracks and a slightly different drum track, while "First and Last and Always" features a totally different drum track as well as a totally different arrangement and has an intro which is 15 seconds longer; the remaining tracks are identical to the standard vinyl release). In March 1988 the album was released on CD for the first time, but it was the Japanese version that was used. In May 1992 a digitally remastered version of the CD was released, again using the Japanese version.

In October 2006 a remastered version of the original vinyl album was released for the first time on CD. This CD edition featured some bonus tracks such as an early demo version of "Some Kind of Stranger" with different lyrics, plus the b sides of the singles "Walk Away" ("Poison Door", "On the Wire" and "Long Train") and "No Time to Cry" ("Blood Money" and "Bury Me Deep"). On 24 July 2015, a 4-LP vinyl box set was released by Warner Music International that included the original version of the album with three EPs from the era, all with reproduced artwork in a slipcase. The set was also released digitally.

== Reception ==
Professional ratings
Review scores
Source	Rating
AllMusic	4/5 stars
Classic Rock	4/10 stars
Q	Favourable
Uncut	8/10

=== Critical ===
John Leland of Spin wrote, "Their songs are all dark, funereal—slow or fast, they all have the same relentlessly overcast timbre. They're a talented bunch trapped inside a clichéd strategy. First and Last and Always isn't bad, but it sure doesn't reward attentive listening."

Amy Hanson of AllMusic praised the album and its influence on the goth scene that was prominent in the mid 80s, praising the mood of the album, saying, "With static drumbeats and jangle-angled guitars backing Andrew Eldritch's atonic, graveyard vocals, the songs on First and Last and Always paid to play alongside the ghosts of myriad forgotten post-punkers as well as the band's own goth forebears." She praised the moods within the album, observing, "From the opening air-fire claustrophobia of "Black Planet" to the melancholy "No Time to Cry,"" and concluded "Copied to death, its brilliance has never been replicated. Indeed, the entire album remains unequalled in the genre, permanently granted top place on a pedestal from which it cannot be toppled."

In a retrospective review, Julian Marszalek of The Quietus observed the lyrics, on the opening track "Black Planet" to be very on the nose, with regards to the political climate of the mid 80s along with the Cold War, saying. "Lyrically, the track finds Eldtrich in a post-apocalyptic world polluted by radiation and acid rain."... "But while Eldritch is bang on the money capturing the zeitgeist, the music was something of a damp squib focusing as it does on Hussey's sound while paying scant regard to concepts such as memorable and powerful riffs." and praised the sound of the album saying "With First And Last And Always, The Sisters Of Mercy delivered a document that fulfilled the promise of those earlier releases, ten tracks marked by Armageddon, women, drugs, cowboy hats and Marlboro Reds." and concluded "Only The Sisters Of Mercy could've thought up the idea of rock music as an ironic vehicle for their bile. And only The Sisters Of Mercy could've been consumed by the very thing they were mocking. But regardless of what came next – and certainly the whip smart music that preceded it – The Sisters Of Mercy's debut album is a mighty full stop and crowning statement that's weathered the years well since its release. For some of us, at least, this really is first and last and always."

=== Commercial ===
The production of the album left the band in enormous debt. According to Eldritch, the album recouped the production costs in 1988. The album peaked at No. 14 on the UK Albums Chart, with strong regional sales in the north of England. It was certified silver (with 60,000 sold) on 30 October 1987 and gold (with 100,000 sold) on 8 May 1989 by the British Phonographic Industry (BPI). In Germany, the group's second largest market after the UK, the album peaked at No. 40 and was certified gold (with 250,000 sold) in 2011. In the US, the album did not enter the Billboard 200. Regarding the failure of the band's singles to crack the UK top 40, Eldritch later commented: "We came close. Our failure to crack it wasn't anything to do with us. I think the band did everything required, although we weren't prepared to package ourselves in the way other acts were".

== Legacy ==
Despite the album and the band's significant impact on the goth scene in the 1980s, with the band being regarded as a major influence on the second wave of the goth movement alongside other bands such as The Mission and Fields of the Nephilim, Andrew Eldritch did not consider The Sisters of Mercy as gothic rock band, and instead wanted them to be classified as a continuation of 1960s classic rock music:

We come from 1969; we are the children of Altamont. We don't know who the fuck Alien Sex Fiend are and we don't want to know. Throughout our career, we've had to fight against the preconception that most of the public has of us as being something that sprang out of post-punk. We regard ourselves as having sprung from pre-1970s rock music, as the inheritors of that tradition and the only people with any chance of propagating it further. I think the title track is gloomy but not the others. They may not be tremendously optimistic...gloomy and doomy suggest an air of apathetic resignation, which I don't think we're prone to.

In 2012, a retrospective by the Sonic Seducer magazine called the album a "pillar of the goth culture" and included it in a list of "10 Key Albums for the Gothic Scene". The band have also been credited as a goth band on various lists of this nature.

== Track listing ==
All lyrics are written by Andrew Eldritch.

Side one
No.	Title	Music	Length
1.	"Black Planet"	Wayne Hussey	4:26
2.	"Walk Away"	Hussey	3:24
3.	"No Time to Cry"	Hussey; Gary Marx; Craig Adams	4:03
4.	"A Rock and a Hard Place"	Hussey	3:34
5.	"Marian (Version)"	Hussey	5:44

Side two
No.	Title	Music	Length
6.	"First and Last and Always"	Marx	4:02
7.	"Possession"	Eldritch; Hussey; Adams	4:39
8.	"Nine While Nine"	Marx	4:12
9.	"Amphetamine Logic"	Marx	4:54
10.	"Some Kind of Stranger"	Marx	7:20
Total length:			46:20

2006 reissue bonus tracks
No.	Title	Lyrics	Music	Original single	Length
11.	"Poison Door"	Marx	Marx	"Walk Away"	3:40
12.	"On the Wire"	Eldritch	Eldritch	"Walk Away"	4:18
13.	"Blood Money"	Eldritch	Hussey	"No Time to Cry"	3:13
14.	"Bury Me Deep"	Eldritch	Eldritch	"No Time to Cry"	4:45
15.	"Long Train"	Eldritch	Eldritch	"Long Train (Flexi Disc)" and "Lucretia My Reflection"	7:28
16.	"Some Kind of Stranger" (previously unreleased early version)	Eldritch	Marx	None	8:43
Total length:					78:27

== Personnel ==
The Sisters of Mercy

- Andrew Eldritch – vocals, sleeve design, mixing
- Craig Adams – bass guitar
- Wayne Hussey – guitar, keyboards, backing vocals
- Gary Marx – guitar
- Doktor Avalanche (Oberheim DMX drum machine) – drums

Technical personnel

- David M. Allen – production, mixing
- Mick Lowe – sleeve layout
- Jill Furmanovsky – sleeve photography
- Ruth Polsky – sleeve photography

== Charts ==
1985 chart performance for First and Last and Always
Chart (1985)	Peak position
European Albums (Music & Media)	31
German Albums (Offizielle Top 100)	40
Swedish Albums (Sverigetopplistan)	23
UK Albums (Official Charts)	14

2025 chart performance for First and Last and Always
Chart (2025)	Peak position
Hungarian Albums (MAHASZ)	26

== Certifications ==
Certifications for First and Last and Always
Region	Certification	Certified units/sales
Germany (BVMI)	Gold	250,000^{^}
United Kingdom (BPI)	Gold	100,000^{^}
^{^} Shipments figures based on certification alone.
