= Under the Gun (The Sisters of Mercy song) =

Single by the Sisters of Mercy

from the album A Slight Case of Overbombing: Greatest Hits Vol. 1
- Released: 16 August 1993
- Genre: Alternative rock; gothic rock
- Length: 5:41 (album version); 6:16 (single); 4:02 (edit)
- Label: Merciful Release; EastWest
- Songwriters: Andrew Eldritch; Billie Hughes; Roxanne Seeman
- Producers: Andrew Eldritch; Billie Hughes

The Sisters of Mercy singles chronology
"Temple of Love" (1992)	"Under the Gun" (1993)

Music video
- "Under the Gun" on YouTube

"Under the Gun" is a power ballad by the English rock band the Sisters of Mercy released as the single from their album A Slight Case of Overbombing: Greatest Hits Vol. 1. It is a duet featuring Terri Nunn on vocals, and was accompanied by a music video with Andrew Eldritch and Nunn. It is the only new song on a greatest hits compilation released in 1993 by Merciful Release on EastWest Records, a UK Warner Music Group label. This is the band's most recent single as of 2026.

The single reached No. 19 on the UK singles chart. The song was written by Andrew Eldritch, Billie Hughes, and Roxanne Seeman. It was co-produced by Eldritch and Hughes. Additional production was credited to Ian Stanley. Two alternate mixes of "Under the Gun" were included in the 2017 bonus tracks of the Sisters of Mercy's compilation album Some Girls Wander by Mistake, released on their own label Merciful Release and distributed by EastWest Records and Warner Music UK.

== Song information ==
Chris Roberts in Melody Maker described the song as "a big Berlin ballad (of Heart, Roxette, etc)" with "several thousand epic heartbreaking refrains" of the chorus hook "Are you living for love?" noting Eldritch's "restrained guitar foreplay" and "fiendish subliminal rant", while comparing it to "the melodrama of Bowie's 'Sweet Thing/Candidate".

The song is mostly a cover of "Two Worlds Apart", a song written by Hughes and Seeman and released on Hughes' album Welcome to the Edge. It appeared earlier as a love theme for the characters of Michael & Julia in the television series Santa Barbara.

“Under The Gun” was originally planned for inclusion on The Crow: Original Motion Picture Soundtrack release. After the accidental death of Brandon Lee during production, the filmmakers dropped The Sisters of Mercy’s “Under The Gun”.

== Critical reception ==
Karen Holmes, The Network 40 praised the song: "Nunn rounds out Andrew's talent for finding incredible females voices to collaborate with. Andrew's contribution to the sexual passion is subliminal with taunting vocals that intensifies Nunn's pipes."

In a glowing review in Melody Maker, Chris Roberts wrote "This is a colossus of a record...ironic and yet thoroughly serious, the spoof vulture of youth culture chimes in belalugubriously [sic] ...Gothic only as in arch, this is as far from indie as it gets. A black (comedy) beauty".

Larry Flick for Single Reviews in Billboard lauded the "Pure gothic tune from this descendant act of Bauhaus et al" writing "Vocals blend beautifully in chorus" while opining "the emphasis on max atmosphere may make track obtuse for newcomers."

== Artists' commentary ==
- Terri Nunn (April 2002): "[Andrew Eldritch] asked if I was going to use it for my record, and since I couldn't get anybody excited about it... It was really strange and dark, and he said 'Well, I want to do it, why don't we sing it?' It was called 'Under the Gun', and we sang it for the Best of Sisters album." "My record company rejected this song for my own record."
- Andrew Eldritch (1993): "The tape I was working from already had her vocal on it. Although I met her once in the mid-80's I didn't meet her to make the record. I just fucked around with the tape that her vocal was already on. But that was one of the reasons for my wanting to cover that song and change it around, because I thought her vocal on it was great! So I used the original demo because I don't see the point in re-recording something that is already so great to start with. So I edited it, I changed the bass, the drums and keyboards around what was already there a little bit. I got a friend of mine from Leeds [Adam Pearson] to put some electric guitars on, and then sang my stuff. So the original version sounds kind of like, I don't know, a sort of Jennifer Rush song I suppose, and the new song sounds like Jennifer Rush from hell!"

== Televised performances and usage in other media ==
- Top of the Pops (1993)
- The ITV Chart Show

== Track listings ==
"Under the Gun" was written by Eldritch, Hughes, and Seeman. "Alice" was written by Eldritch.

7-inch: Merciful Release / MR59
No.	Title	Length
1.	"Under the Gun"	6:16
2.	"Alice" (1993)"	3:57

12-inch: Merciful Release / MR59T
No.	Title	Length
1.	"Under the Gun" (Metropolis mix)"	6:16
2.	"Alice (1993)"	3:56
3.	"Under the Gun (Jutland mix)"	6:20

CD: Merciful Release / MR59CD
No.	Title	Length
1.	"Under the Gun" (Metropolis mix)"	6:16
2.	"Alice (1993)"	3:57
3.	"Under the Gun (Jutland mix)"	6:20

== Personnel ==
Personnel are lifted from the album's liner notes.

- Andrew Eldritch – vocals
- Terri Nunn – vocals
- Adam Pearson – guitars
- Billie Hughes – keyboards, synthesizer
- Ian Stanley - additional production

== Charts ==
Chart (1993)	Peak position
Europe (Eurochart Hot 100 Singles)	51
Germany (GfK)	40
Sweden (Sverigetopplistan)	17
UK Singles (Official Charts)	19
