= Dominion (song) =

Single by the Sisters of Mercy

from the album Floodland
- B-side: "Untitled", "Sandstorm", "Emma", "Ozymandias"
- Released: 15 February 1988
- Recorded: 1987
- Studio: Power Station, New York City
- Genre: Gothic rock; new wave; dark wave
- Length: 7:00 (album version); 5:06 (single version); 3:43 (short edit)
- Label: Merciful Release
- Songwriter: Andrew Eldritch
- Producers: Larry Alexander; Andrew Eldritch; Jim Steinman

The Sisters of Mercy singles chronology
"This Corrosion" (1987)	"Dominion" (1988)	"Lucretia My Reflection" (1988)

"Dominion" is a song by the English rock band the Sisters of Mercy. It was released as the second single from their second studio album, Floodland, in February 1988. The version on Floodland features "Dominion" as well as a coda piece titled "Mother Russia". It was written by band frontman Andrew Eldritch and produced by Larry Alexander, Eldritch, and Jim Steinman.

The song peaked at number 7 on the Irish Singles Chart, number 13 on the UK Singles Chart, and number 30 on the Billboard Dance Club Songs chart.

== Background and composition ==
Eldritch has revealed the song disguises an anti-American diatribe flavoured by the Chernobyl nuclear disaster. At the time of release he also claimed that the second part of the song "Mother Russia" was a call for the West to give up Berlin to the Soviets, "because in reality they already control the city. It's only stupid to pretend otherwise".

Recording of the song took place in 1987 at Power Station Studios in Manhattan, New York. Like its Steinman-produced twin "This Corrosion", "Dominion/Mother Russia" features vocals from the New York Choral Society. The full version comprises two main parts, "Dominion" and "Mother Russia", with "Dominion" being released as a standalone single.

The B-side "Ozymandias" is simply an edit of "Dominion", with most layers of the track played backwards except for the drums. When "Ozymandias" is itself in full played backwards, it sounds simply like a remix of "Dominion" with backwards-echoed drums, in a similar fashion to the drum layer in "Peek-a-Boo" by Siouxsie and the Banshees. "Sandstorm" consists of various sampled saxophone and keyboard parts from "Dominion", mixed to a moody short instrumental track, which was used in the opening section of the video. "Untitled" is a slowed-down instrumental excerpt from "Dominion". A cover of the song "Emma" by Hot Chocolate is also included.

== Track listing ==
All songs written by Andrew Eldritch except "Emma", written by Errol Brown and Tony Wilson.

7-inch single — Merciful Release MR43
No.	Title	Length
1.	"Dominion"	3:43

No.	Title	Length
2.	"Untitled"	3:38
3.	"Sandstorm"	1:49

12-inch single — Merciful Release MR43T
No.	Title	Length
1.	"Dominion"	5:06
2.	"Untitled"	3:36

No.	Title	Length
3.	"Sandstorm"	1:46
4.	"Emma"	6:23

12-inch single — Merciful Release MR43TB
No.	Title	Length
1.	"Dominion"	5:06
2.	"Untitled (long version)" (contains "Untitled" and "Ozymandias")	7:35

No.	Title	Length
3.	"Sandstorm" (excerpt)	0:31
4.	"Emma"	6:23

CD single — Merciful Release MR43CD
No.	Title	Length
1.	"Dominion"	5:06
2.	"Untitled"	3:36
3.	"Sandstorm"	1:46
4.	"Ozymandias"	4:19

Cassette single — Merciful Release MR43C
No.	Title	Length
1.	"Dominion"	5:06

No.	Title	Length
2.	"Untitled"	3:36
3.	"Sandstorm"	1:46
4.	"Ozymandias"	4:19

== Charts ==
Chart (1988)	Peak position
Ireland (IRMA)	7
UK Singles (Official Charts)	13
US Dance Club Songs (Billboard)	30
