= This Corrosion =

Single by the Sisters of Mercy

from the album Floodland
- B-side: "Torch"; "Colours"
- Released: 21 September 1987
- Recorded: 1987
- Studio: Power Station (New York City)
- Genre: Gothic rock; industrial rock
- Length: 11:21 (CD); 9:31 (LP); 8:37 (12" single); 4:27 (7" single); 5:16 (cassette); 3:59 (cassette)
- Label: Merciful Release
- Songwriter: Andrew Eldritch
- Producer: Jim Steinman

The Sisters of Mercy singles chronology
"No Time to Cry" (1985)	"This Corrosion" (1987)	"Dominion" (1988)

"This Corrosion" is a song by the English rock band the Sisters of Mercy, released as the lead single from their second studio album, Floodland (1987), in September 1987. The song peaked at number 6 in Ireland, number 7 in the UK, and number 17 in Germany.

== Composition ==
"This Corrosion" was written by Andrew Eldritch and produced by Jim Steinman, and is one of the band's most well-known songs. It uses a 40-piece choir, and the LP version of the song lasts for nearly 11 minutes (with myriad single versions all substantially shorter.)

Eldritch's lyrics concern his previous band members leaving the Sisters of Mercy to form the gothic rock band the Mission. The latter's lead vocalist, Wayne Hussey, was once a guitarist for the Sisters of Mercy. The lyrics of "This Corrosion" are a parody of Hussey's style.

== Legacy ==
The track was featured in the 2013 science-fiction comedy film, The World's End, with star Simon Pegg playing a 40-something who had been a "goth"/alternative rock fan in the 1980s as a youth who still styled himself on Eldritch. The song is heard twice in the film and in the film's closing credits. The 7" version/single edit (4:27) appears on the soundtrack to the film.

== Track listing ==
All tracks are written by Andrew Eldritch.

7": Merciful Release / MR39
No.	Title	Length
1.	"This Corrosion"	4:27
2.	"Torch"	3:50

12": Merciful Release / MR39T
No.	Title	Length
1.	"This Corrosion"	8:37
2.	"Torch"	3:50
3.	"Colours"	7:13

CD: Merciful Release / MR39CD
No.	Title	Length
1.	"This Corrosion"	11:21
2.	"Torch"	3:55
3.	"Colours"	4:16

Cassette: Merciful Release / MR39C
No.	Title	Length
1.	"This Corrosion"	3:59
2.	"Colours"	4:16
3.	"This Corrosion"	5:16
4.	"Torch"	3:50

While none of the mixes have names, the 7", 12", CD and cassette versions of "This Corrosion" are all different. "Colours" is an edited version on the CD and cassette singles.

== Charts ==
Chart (1987)	Peak position
Germany (GfK)	17
Ireland (IRMA)	6
UK Singles (OCC)	7
US Dance Club Songs (Billboard)	38

== Cover versions ==
The song has been covered by several artists, including:

- In Extremo (1999)
- Gerhard Potuznik (2002)
- Lambchop on the bonus disc for their sixth studio album Is a Woman (2002)
- Godhead (2004)
- Unheilig (2004)
- Dkay.com (2004)
- Diane Birch (2010)
- Maryslim on their 2007 album A Perfect Mess with Jyrki 69 provided guest vocals.

Since 2012, some Sisters of Mercy shows feature a guest appearance by Irish singer Lisa Cuthbert who performs her cover version of "This Corrosion" on piano.

== Sampling ==
The 2001 Most Precious Blood song "Shark Ethic" samples the song's introductory choir section in its opening and final breakdown.
