= Vision Thing (album) =

Studio album by the Sisters of Mercy
- Released: 22 October 1990
- Recorded: 1990
- Studio: Puk Recording Studios (Gjerlev, Denmark)
- Genre: Gothic rock; hard rock; industrial metal
- Length: 42:35
- Label: Merciful Release; East West
- Producer: Andrew Eldritch; Jim Steinman

The Sisters of Mercy chronology
Floodland (1987)	Vision Thing (1990)	Some Girls Wander by Mistake (1992)

Singles from Vision Thing
- 1. "More" Released: 1 October 1990; 2. "Doctor Jeep" Released: December 1990; 3. "Detonation Boulevard" Released: 1990 (US radio single); 4. "When You Don't See Me (Remix)" Released: February 1991 (Germany only); 5. "Vision Thing (Canadian club remix)" Released: 1991 (club single); 6. "I Was Wrong (American fade)" Released: 1991 (US radio single)

Professional ratings
Review scores
Source	Rating
AllMusic	2/5 stars
Chicago Tribune	2.5/4 stars
Christgau's Consumer Guide	(choice cut)
Classic Rock	8/10
NME	10/10 (tracks 1–2); 4/10 (tracks 3–8)
Q	4/5 stars
Record Collector	3/5 stars
Select	4/5
Uncut	4/5 stars

Vision Thing is the third and final studio album by English gothic rock band the Sisters of Mercy. It was released on 22 October 1990 through Merciful Release and East West Records, with Elektra Records handling the US release.

== Recording ==
Soon after the release of the band's previous album, Floodland, Eldritch approached guitarist John Perry to join them on writing a new album. After Perry turned down the offer to become a full-time member, the band began to search for a new guitarist through their record label. Eventually, Eldritch was forwarded a demo tape by young and unknown Andreas Bruhn. Bruhn was called to audition a week after turning in his tape.

As the band—now composed of Eldritch, Bruhn and bassist Patricia Morrison—was about to enter the studio, Morrison was abruptly replaced by the former Sigue Sigue Sputnik member Tony James. As Perry recalls, "When I first heard the Vision Thing material, Patricia was there; when I did the album, she wasn't." While details on Morrison parting ways with the band have never been fully disclosed, she herself was allegedly hired by Eldritch on the day her predecessor, Craig Adams, resigned.

Morrison later confirmed to have worked with Eldritch up until December 1989. She would go on to say her resignation was linked to her monthly salary of £300, and that she had her doubts on the band's musical direction. "I wasn't too thrilled with the direction the record was going in. There were elements I didn't like that could have gone either way, and now that Tony James is in I want nothing to do with it. It seems obvious what's going on – it's scam time..."

While Morrison's recording input on Floodland has been contested, Perry raised doubts whether either she or James play on Vision Thing. "By the time of the recording, Tony James was in, but I'm not sure either [he or Patricia] actually played any bass on the record – sounds sequenced to me." James has later admitted his parts took some twenty minutes in total to record.

Ultimately, the band spent nine months in the Danish recording facilities, with guitarist Tim Bricheno recruited during the final two weeks. Then-manager Boyd Steemson followed suit at one point to observe the progress. "I remember flying out to the [Puk] studio when they were making Vision Thing, and Tony [James] spoke to me and said: 'Well, I guess it's going to be a five-song album.' And I said, 'No, it will not be a five-song album.' Two days later they had seven-and-a-half songs. It was a very painful process."

According to the official website of the band, the final mixes were not the ones worked on the most. "'Vision Thing' is a stripped-down affair. Half of the finished mixes for the album are shelved in favour of rough mixes from earlier stages of the recording session, 'monitor mixes' which retain the immediate feel of the songs."

== Content ==
The album was designed by songwriter and singer Andrew Eldritch as an attack on the policies of the George H. W. Bush administration (the title comes from an oft-cited quote by Bush). According to Eldritch, the album's artwork features a barely visible image of Detroit's inner-city. The area had been heavily economically impacted during this period.

== Legacy ==
Described by Andrew Eldritch as "a fine album", it was included by Q magazine on their "Fifty Best Albums of 1990" list. In 1999, Ned Raggett ranked the album at number 69 on his list of "The Top 136 or So Albums of the Nineties". The song "More" was later included in the movie, There's Something Wrong With The Children, in 2023.

== Track listing ==
All songs produced by Eldritch, except "More", produced by Eldritch and Jim Steinman, and "When You Don't See Me", produced by Chris Tsangarides.

No.	Title	Lyrics	Music	Length
1.	"Vision Thing"	Andrew Eldritch	Eldritch	4:35
2.	"Ribbons"	Eldritch	Eldritch	5:25
3.	"Detonation Boulevard"	Andreas Bruhn, Eldritch	Bruhn, Eldritch	3:52
4.	"Something Fast"	Eldritch	Eldritch	4:36
5.	"When You Don't See Me"	Eldritch	Bruhn, Eldritch	4:47
6.	"Doctor Jeep"	Eldritch	Bruhn, Eldritch	4:41
7.	"More"	Eldritch, Jim Steinman	Eldritch, Steinman	8:21
8.	"I Was Wrong"	Eldritch	Eldritch	6:03
Total length:				42:35

=== 2006 reissue ===
Along with the group's previous two releases, Vision Thing was reissued in November 2006 with bonus tracks.

No.	Title	Lyrics	Music	Original single	Length
9.	"You Could Be the One"	Eldritch	Bruhn	"More"	4:01
10.	"When You Don't See Me" (remix)	Eldritch	Bruhn, Eldritch	"When You Don't See Me (remix)"	4:43
11.	"Doctor Jeep" (extended mix)	Eldritch	Bruhn, Eldritch	"Doctor Jeep" 12″	8:59
12.	"Ribbons (live)"	Eldritch	Eldritch	"When You Don't See Me (remix)" 12″	4:25
13.	"Something Fast" (live)	Eldritch	Eldritch	"When You Don't See Me (remix)" 12″	3:02
Total length:					64:32

== Personnel ==
- Andrew Eldritch – vocals, guitars, keyboards
- Tim Bricheno – guitars
- Andreas Bruhn – guitars
- Tony James – bass
- Doktor Avalanche (drum machine) – drums

Guest musicians

- John Perry – guitars, slide guitar on "Detonation Boulevard"
- Maggie Reilly – backing vocals on "Vision Thing", "More", "Detonation Boulevard", "Something Fast" and "Doctor Jeep"

== Charts ==
=== Weekly charts ===
Weekly chart performance for Vision Thing
Chart (1990–1991)	Peak position
Australian Albums (ARIA)	73
Austrian Albums (Ö3 Austria)	21
European Albums (Music & Media)	34
German Albums (Offizielle Top 100)	13
New Zealand Albums (RMNZ)	38
Swedish Albums (Sverigetopplistan)	22
Swiss Albums (Schweizer Hitparade)	22
UK Albums (Official Charts)	11
US Billboard 200	136

=== Year-end charts ===
Year-end chart performance for Vision Thing
Chart (1991)	Position
German Albums (Offizielle Top 100)	52

== Certifications ==
Certifications for Vision Thing
Region	Certification	Certified units/sales
Germany (BVMI)	Gold	250,000^{^}
United Kingdom (BPI)	Silver	60,000^{^}
^{^} Shipments figures based on certification alone.
