= Lucretia My Reflection =

1988 single by the Sisters of Mercy

Single by The Sisters of Mercy

from the album Floodland
- B-side: "Long Train"
- Released: June 1988
- Recorded: 1987 in England
- Genre: Gothic rock; post-punk; dark wave; industrial rock
- Length: 4:57 (album version); 4:20 (single edit); 9:52 (extended version)
- Label: Merciful Release
- Songwriter: Andrew Eldritch
- Producers: Larry Alexander; Andrew Eldritch

The Sisters of Mercy singles chronology
"Dominion" (1988)	"Lucretia My Reflection" (1988)	"More" (1990)

"Lucretia My Reflection" is a song by the English rock band the Sisters of Mercy. Released as the third and final single from their second studio album, Floodland, in June 1988, it reached number 20 on the UK singles chart.

== Overview ==
The song was written by Andrew Eldritch as a "welcome" to the Sisters of Mercy bassist, Patricia Morrison, who, he said, "always strikes me as a Lucrezia [Borgia]-type person". Its lyrics concern the fall of an empire, war and the consequent destruction of other aspects of life.

== Track listing ==
- All songs written by Andrew Eldritch.

All tracks are written by 7": Merciful Release / MR45.

No.	Title	Length
1.	"Lucretia, My Reflection"	4:20
2.	"Long Train (1984)"	7:27

12": Merciful Release / MR45T
No.	Title	Length
1.	"Lucretia, My Reflection"	9:52
2.	"Long Train (1984)"	7:25

CD: Merciful Release / MR45CD
No.	Title	Length
1.	"Lucretia, My Reflection"	9:51
2.	"Long Train (1984)"	4:26

== Charts ==
Chart (1988)	Peak position
Ireland (IRMA)	22
UK Singles (OCC)	20
US Dance Club Songs (Billboard)	30
