= Death Party =

EP by The Gun Club
- Released: April 13, 1983
- Recorded: January–February 1983
- Studio: Blank Tapes Studios, New York
- Length: 19:43
- Label: Animal Records (original release); Sympathy for the Record Industry (2004 US reissue); Cooking Vinyl (2009 European reissue)
- Producer: Chris Stein, Jeffrey Lee Pierce

The Gun Club chronology
Miami (1982)	Death Party (1983)	The Las Vegas Story (1984)

Professional ratings
Review scores
Source	Rating
Allmusic	3/5 stars

Death Party is an EP by American rock band The Gun Club, released in 1983. It is the only official release of the Jim Duckworth and Dee Pop line up of the band which existed for about eight months.

A scheduled recording session for Tex & the Horseheads, the band Jeffrey Lee Pierce had put together around his girlfriend Linda/Texacala Jones was going to go unused. So the Gun Club filled the booking and recorded the Death Party EP with a bassist called Jimmy Joe Uliana who was a friend of Dee Pop's. Patricia Morrison was the Gun Club's bassist at the time, but didn't play on the EP because of the recording session's spur of the moment nature.

Death Party was produced by Chris Stein, although he came to the sessions after most of the recordings were completed.

== Reception ==
In a 1983 Trouser Press review, Jim Green speculates that "Pierce may be assessing new stylistic directions", but concludes "this ain't it." Green says that Death Party lacks the "singleminded intensity of Gun Club's [albums]." He also says that "[t]he songs...sound like leftovers" and that the "record treads water more than anything else."

== Track listing ==
All tracks are written by Jeffrey Lee Pierce.

Side one
No.	Title	Length
1.	"The House on Highland Avenue"	3:10
2.	"The Lie"	3:16
3.	"The Light of the World"	3:07

Side two
No.	Title	Length
1.	"Death Party"	5:53
2.	"Come Back Jim"	3:50

== Personnel ==
The Gun Club

- Jeffrey Lee Pierce - vocals, piano, guitar; bass on "The Lie"
- Jim Duckworth - lead guitar
- Dee Pop (Dimitri C. Papadopoulos) - drums, percussion

with:

- "Texas" Linda Jones (Texacala Jones) - backing vocals and "screams"
- Jimmy Joe Uliana - bass except on "The Lie"

Technical

- Joe Arlotta - session engineer
- Robin Young, Clayton Clark - cover artwork
