= Miami (The Gun Club album) =

Studio album by the Gun Club
- Released: September 20, 1982
- Recorded: June 1982
- Studios: Blank Tape, New York
- Genres: Punk blues, alternative country, post-punk
- Length: 39:45
- Label: Animal
- Producer: Chris Stein

The Gun Club chronology
Fire of Love (1981)	Miami (1982)	Death Party EP (1983)

Miami is the second studio album by American rock band the Gun Club, released in 1982. It was released on Animal Records, founded by guitarist Chris Stein of Blondie, who also produced the album.

Debbie Harry, also of Blondie, appears as a backing singer on various tracks on the album under the pseudonym "D.H. Laurence Jr." The album front cover photograph does not include bassist Rob Ritter who had already left the band. Before leaving, Ritter first taught all the bass-lines to Patricia Morrison, his replacement in the Gun Club and former bandmate in the Bags.

== Reception ==
Professional ratings
Review scores
Source	Rating
AllMusic	4.5/5 stars
American Songwriter	4.5/5 stars
Classic Rock	7/10
Mojo	4/5 stars
Q	3/5 stars
Record Collector	4/5 stars
Sounds	5/5 stars
Spin Alternative Record Guide	7/10
Uncut	4/5 stars

Miami was ranked among the top fifty "Albums of the Year" for 1982 by NME.

In a 1982 article about the band, Scott Isler described their approach as "nostalgic revivalism" which is "unique...in overhauling country blues for a bloodcurdling contemporary impact. Far from camping it up, Pierce respects the elemental power of his inspiration; his eerie semi-coherent imagery are in line of descent." Isler says that the band's "understated accompaniment is similarly effective with its less-is-more minimalism. A potent, unstable blend." According to Pierce, "[e]ven though we idolized an older style of music, none of us were good enough to play it! What we came up with is our own version. I find myself writing about the feeling of being lost."

== Track listing ==
All tracks are written by Jeffrey Lee Pierce, except where noted.

Side one
No.	Title	Writer(s)	Length
1.	"Carry Home"		3:14
2.	"Like Calling Up Thunder"		2:29
3.	"Brother and Sister"		2:57
4.	"Run Through the Jungle"	John Fogerty	4:07
5.	"A Devil in the Woods"		3:05
6.	"Texas Serenade"		4:40

Side two
No.	Title	Writer(s)	Length
1.	"Watermelon Man"	Ward Dotson, Jeffrey Lee Pierce	4:11
2.	"Bad Indian"		2:37
3.	"John Hardy"	Traditional; arranged by Jeffrey Lee Pierce	3:21
4.	"Fire of Love"	Jody Reynolds, Stordivant Sonya	2:14
5.	"Sleeping in Blood City"		3:29
6.	"Mother of Earth"		3:21
Total length:			39:45

== Personnel ==
The Gun Club

- Jeffrey Lee Pierce – vocals, guitar, piano, background vocals on "Watermelon Man", lead guitar on "Run Through the Jungle", "John Hardy" and "Mother of Earth"
- Ward Dotson – lead guitar, background vocals on "Watermelon Man"
- Rob Ritter – bass
- Terry Graham – drums

Additional musicians

- Debbie Harry (credited as D.H. Laurence, Jr.) – backing vocals
- Walter Steding – fiddle on "Watermelon Man"
- Chris Stein – producer, bongos on "Watermelon Man"
- Mark Tomeo – steel guitar on "Texas Serenade" and "Mother of Earth"

Production

- Joe Arlotta – session engineer
- Butch Jones – mixing engineer
- Chris D. – cover photographs, original design

"Special thanks to: Bob Singerman, Linda Cuckovich, Chris D., Robyn Weiss, Lois Graham, Lux Interior, Ivy Rorschach, Kid Congo, Linda Jones, Chris Stein and D.H. Laurence, Jr."
