= Jeterboy Records =

Defunct American record label

- Founded: 1980s
- Defunct: 1990s
- Status: Inactive
- Genre: Punk rock, hardcore punk
- Country of origin: United States
- Location: Broward County, Florida

Jeterboy Records was an American record label of the 1980s and 1990s, based in Broward County, Florida. It was part of the South Florida Punk and Hardcore scene, and released music by The Eat, Larry Joe Miller, D.T. Martyrs, Johnny Tonite, Stan Still Dance Band, Spanish Dogs, and other bands.

== Releases ==
In 1983, Jeterboy Records released its first album, a compilation cassette called Jukebox.

- "One Call to Cuba" - The Eat
- "X-Rated Go-Go Lunch" - Gay Cowboys In Bondage
- "In My Lifetime" - Radio Berlin
- "Breaking the Law" - Crank
- "Motorboat" - The Cichlids
- "Artist" - Stan Still Dance Band
- "Nixon's Binoculars" - The Eat
- "Knocked-Out Joint On Mars" - Larry Joe Miller
- "Lookin'" - Jimmy J And Joe (Jimmy Johnson and Joe Imperato)
- "Roosterin' With Intent (Live At The Button)" - Charlie Pickett And The Eggs
- "Shake Like a Hurricane" - Spinouts
- "Grizzly Bear" - Poster Children

Other releases include:

| Year | Band | Album | Type | Studio | Producer | Engineer | Notes | Ref |
|---|---|---|---|---|---|---|---|---|
| 1983 | The Eat | Scattered Wahoo Action | Cassette | Sync Studios (Miami), Music Labs, other | The Eat and Charlie Pickett; executive producer Kennedy | | Compiled and edited by Joe Harris. Original pressing was 300 copies. Re-released in 1996 (10" vinyl, 1000 copies) by Wicked Witch Records; in 2003 (CD) by Moss Music; and 2008 (CD) by Jeterboy/Lurch Records | |
| 1985 | D.T. Martyrs | Narcotics in the Carport | Cassette | T.A.M. Studios, L7 Studios (Deerfield Beach) | | Harmon, Bob Wlos | Recorded February 1985; re-released in 2003 (CD) by Moss Music | |
| 1985 | The Squalor Sound/Various Artists | Obscurities | Cassette | | | | | |
| 1985 | Stan Still Dance Band | Midnight | | | | | | |
| 1985 | Spanish Dogs | Strange Bedfellows | | | | | | |
| 1989 | Ian Hammond And Sins Of Soul | Last of the Martyrs | LP | L7 Studio (Deerfield Beach) | Ian Hammond, Tony Bazemore, Bob Wlos | | Released in 2003 (CD) by Moss Music. | |
| 1991 | Johnny Tonite | The Savage Ones | Cassette | L7 Studio (Deerfield Beach) | Pete Moss, Bob Wlos, Randy Ruffner | Bob Wlos, Mike "Bongo God" Hawn, Pete Moss | Re-released (CD) by Moss Records. | |
| 1993 | Johnny Tonite | Live Tonight | Cassette | Sync Studios (Miami) | Frank "Rat Bastard" Falestra, Johnny Tonite | Frank "Rat Bastard" Falestra, Pete Moss | Re-released (CD) by Moss Records. | |
| 1995 | Johnny Tonite | Time of Arson | | | | | | |
| 1995 | The Eat | Hialeah | 7" EP | Sync Studios (Miami) | The Eat | Hal Spector | Recorded 1988–1992; mixed by Hal Spector. Original pressing was 800 copies. | |
| ? | Larry Joe Miller | Rub A Bucket | Cassette | Sync Studios (Miami; tracks 1–7), Rick Shaw Radio Show (Tracks 11–12) | Joe Harris | | Compiled by Joe Harris. Recorded 1982–83. | |
