= Route 33 (disambiguation) =

Route 33 is a common name for roads and highways in many countries.

Route 33 may also refer to:

- Route 33 (group), an Australian country duo
- Route 33 (MTA Maryland), a bus route in Baltimore, Maryland and its suburbs
- London Buses route 33
- 33 Ashbury/18th Street, a bus route in San Francisco
- Route 33 (album), a 1986 album by Charlie Pickett
