= Lucky Jim (disambiguation) =

Lucky Jim is a novel by Kingsley Amis.

Lucky Jim may also refer to :

== Films ==
- Lucky Jim (1909 film), an unrelated film
- Lucky Jim (1957 film), an adaptation of the novel
- Lucky Jim (2003 film), an adaptation of the novel

== People ==
- Jim Pollock (rugby union) (born 1958), Scottish Rugby player
- James F. Gusella (born 1952), Canadian scientist
- James Barnor (born 1929), Ghanaian photographer
- Lucky Jim Elliott, drummer for Australian band, The Cruel Sea
- "Lucky Jim", a self-depicted cartoon racing tipster drawn by Clive Collins (1942–2022)

== Fictional characters ==
- James "Lucky Jim" Howlett, alter ego of Wolverine in the Marvel Universe
- Lucky Jim, a fictional character from the Simpsons episode "Sex, Pies and Idiot Scrapes"
- "Lucky Jim" Morrison, a fictional character from 1955 film The Fighting Chance played by Howard Wendell

== Other ==
- Lucky Jim (album), a 1993 album by the Gun Club
- Lucky Jim, a Breeders Crown-winning horse trained by Julie Miller

== See also ==
- Lucky Jim Camp
