= The Las Vegas Story =

The Las Vegas Story may refer to:

- The Las Vegas Story (film), a 1952 film starring Jane Russell and Victor Mature
- The Las Vegas Story (album), an album by The Gun Club
