= Johnny Salton =

American rock guitarist (d. 2010)

Johnny Salton was a rock guitarist for bands from Florida from the late 1970s until his death in 2010. He is best known for his work with Charlie Pickett. According to Salton's friend and fellow guitarist, Peter Buck of R.E.M., "when he played really well, he just floated above everyone else."

== Style and influences ==
Trouser Press described Salton as "a first-rate student of (Johnny) Thunders, (John) Fogerty and Sky Saxon (not to mention a dead-great slide player)."

Bandmate Charlie Pickett likened Salton's lead guitar playing to that of blues-based virtuosos such as Eric Clapton, Albert King, and Harvey Mandel. Pickett said, "John chose different notes, and he chose to phrase them differently, and he chose to shape them differently. John just had an ability to use the same colors that everyone else uses, but it comes out in a different way."

Peter Buck underscored Pickett, calling Salton "a great player. And he never played the same way twice."

== Career ==
The book Going Underground: American Punk 1979-1989 described Salton's presence on the South Florida scene, noting that he and "his formidable guitar skills...seemed to be in just about every band in town." That passage described a group called Crank. Another punk-oriented outfit that included Salton was The Reactions, whose singles became high-priced collector's items, notably in Japan. Salton also played bass for this group.

Attention to Salton broadened as part of the group Charlie Pickett and the Eggs. The group formed in the late 1970s and released its debut album, Live at the Button, in 1982 on Open Records, a local label in Miami associated with Open Books & Records. It was well reviewed by England's music weekly, Melody Maker. An EP, Cowboy Junkie Au-Go-Go (also on Open Records) followed in 1984. It won praise from respected rock writer Robert Christgau of The Village Voice, who called it "ace country-punk."

Salton was also featured on the 1988 album by Charlie Pickett and the MC3, The Wilderness (issued by Safety Net Records). Trouser Press noted, "Salton's blistering blues-based guitar excitement provides fiery encouragement."

Songwriting was another aspect of Salton's work. "Memories" was a cut on the 1987 album Cuba by The Silos, co-written with that group's Bob Rupe. It was described as one of the album's strongest songs and as a top-notch tune.

From 1984 onward, he also led a group called the Psycho Daisies. The South Florida Sun-Sentinel described the Daisies in 2003 as "'60s garage...in its purest form" and Salton as a survivor of the rock 'n' roll wars. The following year, the Miami New Times called them the "Best Local Rock Band," citing Salton's "heart, soul, and gift."

== Lifestyle and death ==
Salton "struggled with drugs and other demons" for many years. As a result, Peter Buck observed that his playing, while often brilliant, was inconsistent. (Buck produced The Wilderness and went to great lengths to coax out Salton's best performance.)

in October 2010, Salton died of lung cancer that had spread to his liver.

== In memoriam ==
Charlie Pickett issued a new album called See You in Miami in 2018. It featured a song called "So Long Johnny" — written by old friend Peter Buck. That song first appeared on Buck's self-titled solo album, which was dedicated "to Johnny Salton and all the other Johnnies."

== Discography ==
=== The Reactions ===
- Official Release 7-inch EP (Reaction, 1980)
- The Reactions Love You 7-inch EP (Reaction, 1981)
- Love You Live (Moss Music, unknown date)
- Official Release (Moss Music, unknown date)
- Saturday's Gone Wild compilation (Cheap Rewards, 2011)

=== Crank ===
- Breaking the Law - track A4 on Jukebox compilation (Jeterboy, 1982)

=== Charlie Pickett & The Eggs ===
- Live at the Button (Open, 1982)
- Cowboy Junkie Au Go-Go (Open, 1984)

=== Charlie Pickett & The MC3 ===
- The Wilderness (Safety Net, 1988)

=== Charlie Pickett ===
- Bar Band Americanus (Bloodshot, 2008)

=== Psycho Daisies ===
- Pushin' Up Daisies (Sublapse, 1985)
- Sonicly Speaking (Resonance, 1988)
- 30 Milligrams of Your Love (Resonance, 1990)
- It’s No Fun to Be Paranoid (self-issued, 2001)
- Snowflakes Falling on the International Dateline (self-issued, 2003)
- Welcome to Nowhere (Lurch, 2006)
- Return from Blood Island (self-issued, 2008)
