= (Won't You Come Home) Bill Bailey =

1902 popular song by Hughie Cannon

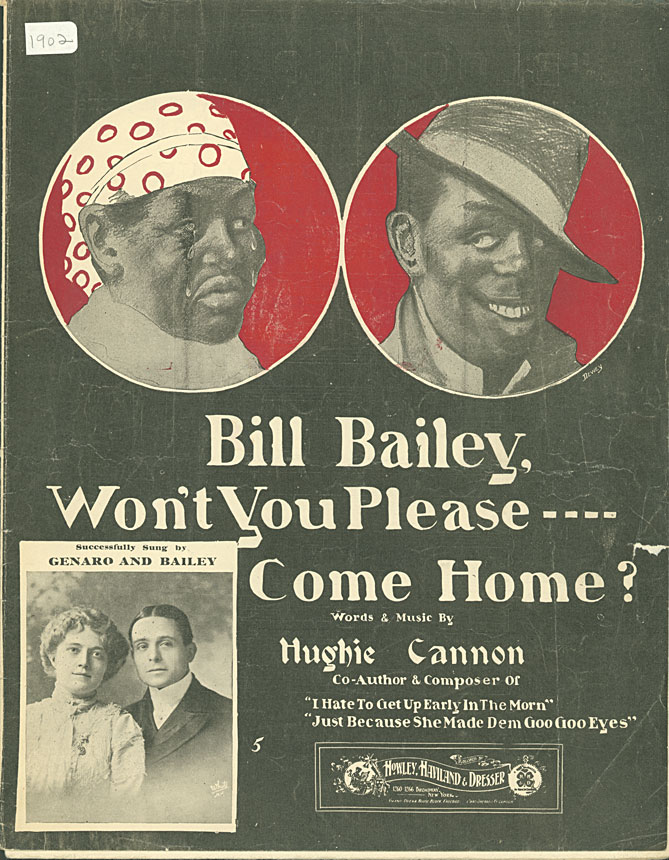
- 1902 sheet music cover, words and music written by Hughie Cannon published by Howley, Haviland and Dresser

Song by Al Hirt
- Written: 1902
- Published: Howley, Haviland and Dresser
- Genre: Dixieland jazz, jazz standard
- Composer: Hughie Cannon

"(Won't You Come Home) Bill Bailey", originally titled "Bill Bailey, Won't You Please.... Come Home?" is a popular song published in 1902. It is commonly referred to as simply "Bill Bailey".

The words and music were written by Hughie Cannon, an American songwriter and pianist, and it was published by Howley, Haviland and Dresser. It is still a standard with Dixieland and traditional jazz bands. The simple 32-bar chord sequence of its chorus also underpins many other tunes played mainly by jazz bands, such as "Over the Waves", "Washington and Lee Swing", "Bourbon Street Parade", "My Little Girl", and the final themes of "Tiger Rag" and "The Beer Barrel Polka".

== Origin ==
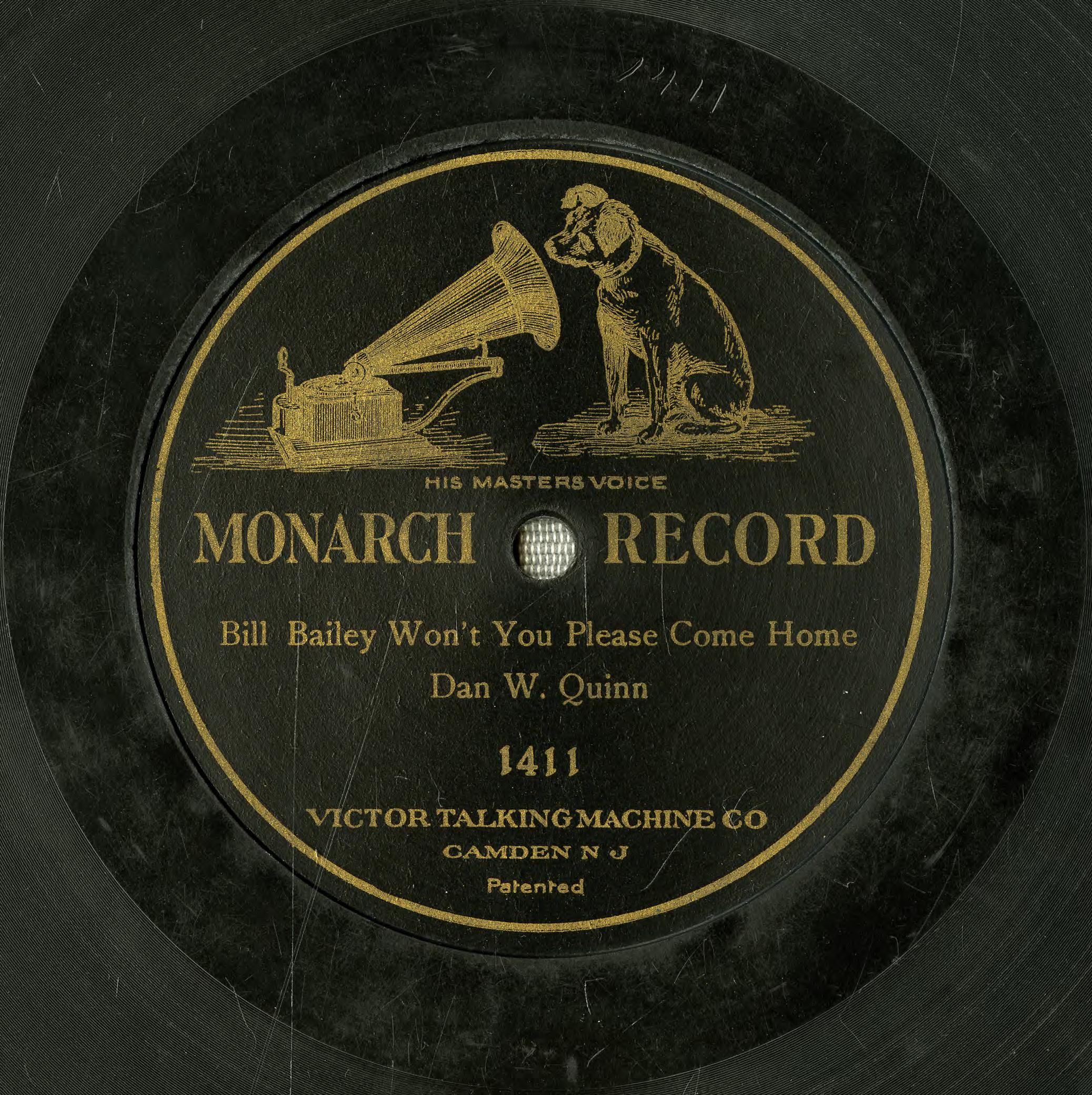
May 1902 Victor Monarch recording of Dan W. Quinn performing "Bill Bailey, Won't You Please Come Home?"

Cannon worked as a pianist in Jackson, Michigan, where he reportedly drew inspiration for the song from local musician Willard "Bill" Bailey and his wife Sarah (née Siegrist). According to accounts of the song's origins, Cannon was inspired from Bailey's habit of staying out late and his strained marriage to Sarah and reportedly intended the song as a joke, although Sarah did not appreciate the lyrics. Cannon sold the rights to the song outright and later died of cirrhosis in 1912, aged 35. Willard and Sarah Bailey divorced, and Willard later lived in Los Angeles with their daughter Frances. He died in April 1954, while Sarah died in 1978, aged 104.

== Popular recordings ==
- In 1902, the first recording; sung and played by Arthur Collins on piano.
- In December 1952, the song featured in the film Meet Me at the Fair, directed by Douglas Sirk.
- In 1960, Bobby Darin recorded the song, where it went to No. 19 on the Billboard Hot 100, No. 13 in Canada, and No. 34 on the UK singles chart.
- In 1966, the Tokyo Happy Coats performed the song live on the Ed Sullivan Show.
- In 1987, garage rock- punk blues band the Gun Club released a version of the song as the opening track on their album Mother Juno.

== Parodies ==
- Allan Sherman recorded a parody of the song titled "Won't You Come Home Disraeli?", included on his 1963 album My Son, the Celebrity.
- In the "Miss Solar System", an episode of The Jetsons, first broadcast on February 3, 1963, Jane Jetson performs "Won't You Fly Home Bill Spacely", a parody of the song.
- In The Simpsons episode "Whacking Day", Grampa Simpson recalls posing as a female carabret singer in Nazi Germany and performing a version of the song for Adolf Hitler, replacing "Bill Bailey" with "Franz Brauder".
- The 1980 Smurfs album Smurfing Sing Song includes a version of this song titled "Smurf Baby", in which the chorus is repeated with the name "Bill Bailey" replaced with "Smurf Baby".
- Sandler & Young recorded a "Bill Bailey Medley" for their 1968 album The In Person Album, featuring arrangements in various styles, including those associated with Nashville sound, Italian opera, Johann Sebastian Bach and Tel Aviv.
- The Capitol Steps recorded a parody titled "Won't You Go Home Bill Bradley", referring to Bill Bradley's campaign for the 2000 Democratic Presidential Primary. It appeared on their album It's Not Over 'Til the First Lady Sings! (2000).
- In P.G. Wodehouse's 1906 novel Love Among the Chickens, the narrator, Jeremy Garnet, refers to the song while lamenting his romantic troubles: "Why did Bill Bailey leave home? Once more, because of a woman".

== See also ==
- List of pre-1920 jazz standards
- Bill Bailey (British comedian nicknamed after the song)
