= Knoxville Girls =

Knoxville Girls was a short-lived American, New York City based, alternative rock supergroup that contained: Bob Bert (of Sonic Youth and Pussy Galore), on drums, Jerry Teel (of Boss Hog and Little Porkchop) on vocals, guitars; Kid Congo Powers (of The Gun Club and The Cramps) on guitar and vocals; Jack Martin (of Little Porkchop and Blackstrap Molasses Family) on guitar; and Barry London (of Stab City) on organ.

The group released two albums: Knoxville Girls in 1999, and In a Paper Suit in 2001, before disbanding.

== Discography ==
- Knoxville Girls (1999)
- In a Paper Suit (2001)
