= Cameo Theater =

Theater in Miami Beach, Florida, US

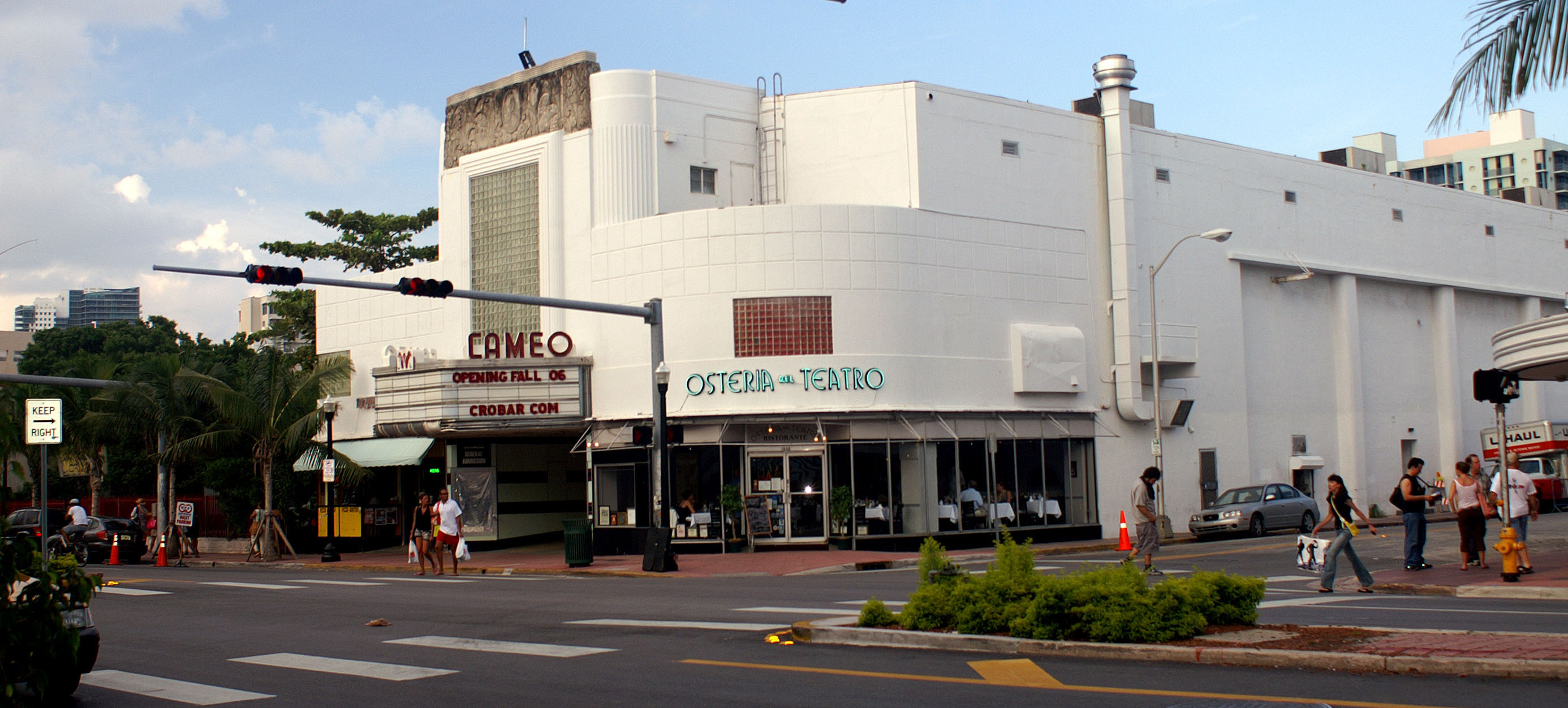
- Interactive map of Cameo Theater
- Address: 1445 Washington Avenue; Miami Beach, Florida; United States
- Coordinates: 25.7871°N 80.13144°W
- Owner: Zori Hayon
- Type: Theater
- Event: Music

Construction
- Built: 1936
- Renovated: 1989, 1999
- Years active: 1936–present

Website
- cameomiami.com

The Cameo Theater was built in 1936 and is located at 1445 Washington Avenue in Miami Beach, Florida. The theater has a long history and was a major venue for punk and hardcore acts beginning in 1985, when Richard Shelter struck a deal with owner Zori Hayon to book shows there. The first show was held in July 1985 and featured Canadian punk band D.O.A.

In an interview with Roger Deering, Kristy O'Brien describes the Cameo and the local scene in the 80s:

"Growing up in South Florida during the 1980s was a heady experience for anyone with alternative inklings. Against the backdrop of endless blue skies, genteel faded pastel jewel box buildings, midnight porch-sitting elderly, and relentless heat tempered with hope, beat the heart of the underground music world known as the Cameo Theater. And undeniably, the intense rhythm of that Miami Beach heartbeat was everyone's favorite local band, the Drills. Most of the great hardcore punk bands such as Black Flag, Ramones, and Dead Kennedys came to play in this tiny, decrepit hot pink and lime-green art deco throwback and as an opening band, the Drills were a huge part of the burgeoning all-ages movement".

== History ==
The Cameo began as a movie theater in 1936. In 1986, with the help of iconic Miami figure Richard Shelter, the building was transformed into a music venue, booking numerous punk acts big and small, both from the local scene and from overseas.

Zori Hayon closed the Cameo in late 1989 for renovations and reopened it in March 1990 with a concert by the Sugarcubes. Around this time, however, the theater began to host more electronic-themed music shows and eventually became a disco dance club. In 1999, it was closed again for renovations and later reopened, no longer as a music venue but newly rebranded as Cameo Nightclub.
