= Mother Juno =

Studio album by the Gun Club
- Released: October 17, 1987
- Recorded: Summer 1987
- Studios: Hansa Tonstudio, Berlin
- Genre: Alternative rock
- Length: 41:14
- Labels: Fundamental; Red Rhino
- Producer: Robin Guthrie

The Gun Club chronology
The Las Vegas Story (1984)	Mother Juno (1987)	Pastoral Hide and Seek (1990)

Mother Juno is the fourth studio album by American rock band the Gun Club, released in 1987. It was produced by Robin Guthrie of the Cocteau Twins.

"Yellow Eyes" was originally titled "Funky Junkie"; "Nobody's City" was originally "Sleepy Times Blues". The original recordings of Mother Juno were released as Mother Berlin in 2015 on Bang! Records, containing an additional track, "Country One".

In 2023, Mother Juno was re-released with remastered tracks, including 12” single versions of the songs “The Breaking Hands”, “Crabdance”, and “Nobody’s City”. Additional demos are included from the aforementioned Mother Berlin sessions.

== Production ==
The album was recorded in Berlin. The recording took 14 days. The cover used a painting by Claus Castenskiold, the Danish-born painter.

== Release ==
The album did well on the independent and college charts, peaking at No. 3 on the UK indie and No. 1 on the CMJ charts.

== Critical reception ==
Professional ratings
Review scores
Source	Rating
AllMusic	4.5/5 stars
The Encyclopedia of Popular Music	3/5 stars
The Guardian	4/5 stars
MusicHound Rock: The Essential Album Guide	4.5/5 stars
New Musical Express	10/10
The Rolling Stone Album Guide	3.5/5 stars
Spin Alternative Record Guide	7/10

Trouser Press wrote: "On songs like 'The Breaking Hands' ... producer Robin Guthrie of the Cocteau Twins spins a delicately layered web of sound; more straightforward numbers like the shimmying 'Thunderhead' recast the old energy in slightly more linear terms, although guest Blixa Bargeld does his best to tilt 'Yellow Eyes' on its axis." The Rolling Stone Album Guide called the album "swamp music for thinking people."

== Track listing ==
Original 1987 album

All tracks composed by Jeffrey Lee Pierce

1. "Bill Bailey" – 3:39
2. "Thunderhead" – 3:28
3. "Lupita Screams" – 3:12
4. "Yellow Eyes" – 6:30
5. "The Breaking Hands" – 4:12
6. "Araby" – 3:01
7. "Hearts" – 3:59
8. "My Cousin Kim" – 2:47
9. "Port of Souls" – 4:49

2005 remaster (SFTRI 765)

1. "Bill Bailey"
2. "Thunderhead"
3. "Lupita Screams"
4. "Yellow Eyes"
5. "The Breaking Hands"
6. "Araby"
7. "Hearts"
8. "My Cousin Kim"
9. "Port of Souls"
10. "Crabdance"
11. "Nobody's City"

2023 remaster (Extra Term Audio LLC)

1. "Bill Bailey" – 3:39
2. "Thunderhead" – 3:28
3. "Lupita Screams" – 3:12
4. "Yellow Eyes" – 6:30
5. "The Breaking Hands" – 4:12
6. "Araby" – 3:01
7. "Hearts" – 3:59
8. "My Cousin Kim" – 2:47
9. "Port of Souls" – 4:49
10. "The Breaking Hands" 12" version – 4:18
11. "Crabdance" 12" version – 2:59
12. "Nobody's City" 12" version – 4:09
13. "Port of Souls" (demo) – 5:27
14. "Araby" (demo) – 3:06
15. "Lupita Screams" (demo) – 3:21
16. "Funkie Junkie (Yellow Eyes)" (demo) – 6:42
17. "Hearts" (demo) – 4:13
18. "Bill Bailey" (demo) – 3:46
19. "Sleepy Time Blues (Nobody's City)" (demo) – 4:16
20. "My Cousin Kim" (demo) – 2:46
21. "Thunderhead" (demo) – 3:34
22. "The Breaking Hands" (demo) – 4:34
23. "Crab Dance" (demo) – 3:06
24. "Country One" (unreleased instrumental, demo) – 3:10

== Personnel ==
The Gun Club

- Jeffrey Lee Pierce - vocals, guitar, whistle
- Kid Congo Powers - guitar
- Romi Mori - bass; lead guitar on "The Breaking Hands"
- Nick Sanderson - drums

with:

- Blixa Bargeld - guitar on "Yellow Eyes"

Technical

- Lincoln Fong - engineer
- André Giere - assistant engineer
- Claus Castenskiold - sleeve painting
