= Cypress Grove (musician) =

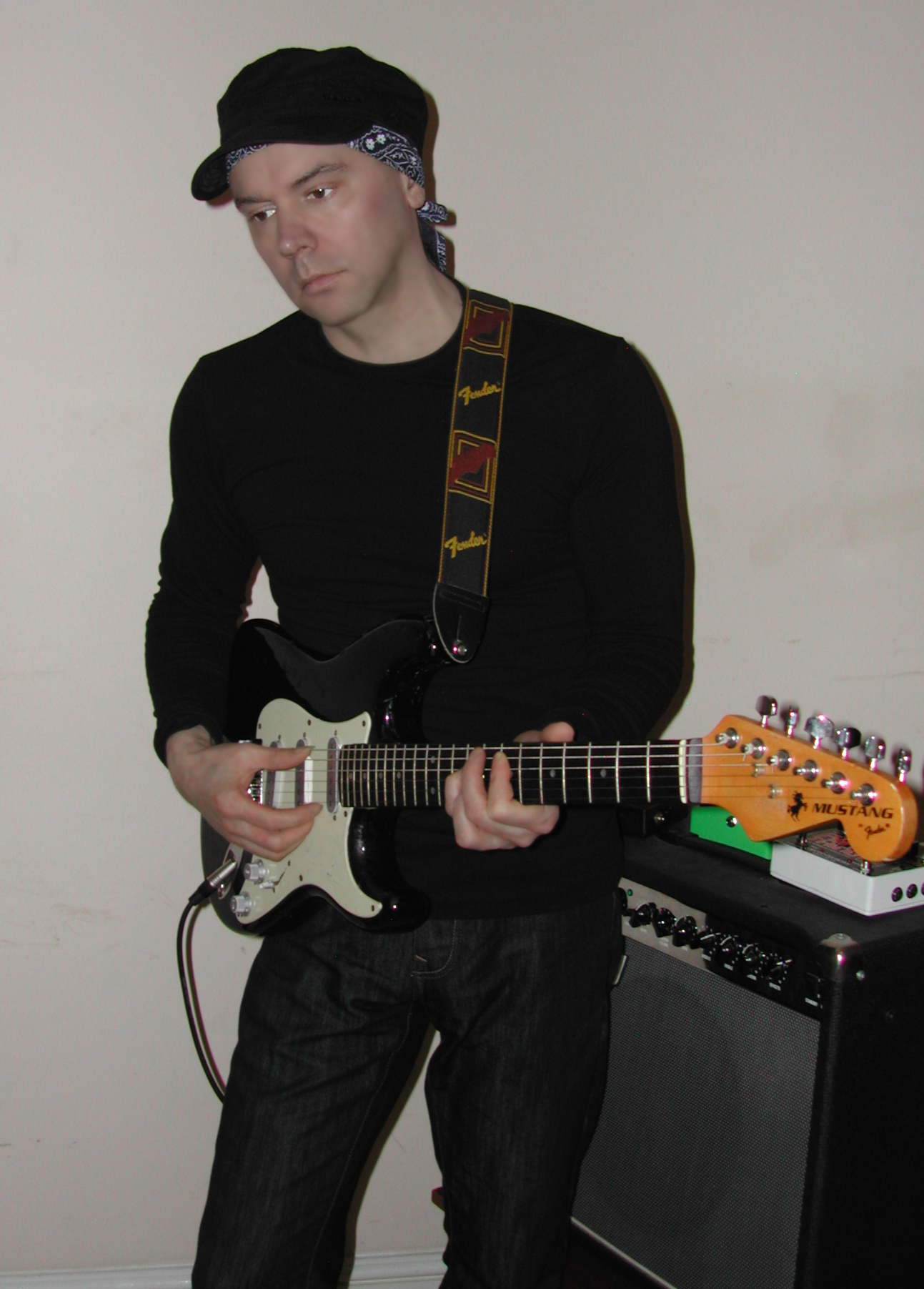

Background information
- Born: 1959 (age 66–67); London, England
- Genres: Alternative rock
- Occupations: Musician, singer, songwriter, composer, producer
- Instruments: Vocals, guitar, bass guitar, keyboards, drums
- Years active: 1979-present
- Labels: Glitterhouse, Rustblade

Cypress Grove (born 1959) is an English musician, singer, songwriter, composer and producer.

== Biography ==
Cypress Grove was born into a musical family in London. He was taught by his father, a professional jazz drummer, to play drums from a very early age, but by the time he turned 16, his passion became the guitar.

== Musical career ==
As his passion for the guitar developed he became infatuated with pre-war acoustic blues. This led to an encounter in 1988 with Jeffrey Lee Pierce from The Gun Club who shared similar interests and which grew into a collaboration on an album of roots material, Ramblin' Jeffrey Lee and Cypress Grove with Willie Love in 1992. Cypress and Jeffrey went on to tour the album both with a band and as an acoustic duo.

In October 1994, Pierce and Grove were filmed for Henri-Jean Debon's Hard Times Killin' Floor Blues The film was eventually released in 2008.

Ten years after Pierce died of a brain hemorrhage in 1996, Cypress discovered a tape of them rehearsing songs that Jeffrey had written. These were works in progress, and while the quality was deemed too poor for release, Cypress invited a number of musicians to record the songs properly and help him complete them. This series became known as The Jeffrey Lee Pierce Session Project, an endeavour that has currently produced four albums.

Grove has recorded with a number of musicians including Nick Cave, Debbie Harry, Chris Stein, Mark Lanegan, Iggy Pop, Isobel Campbell, Thurston Moore, Warren Ellis (musician), The Raveonettes, Crippled Black Phoenix, Mick Harvey, David Eugene Edwards, Hugo Race, Bertrand Cantat, Barry Adamson, Lydia Lunch, Jim Sclavunos, Mark Stewart and James Johnston.

In 2010, Cypress Grove and Lydia Lunch recorded A Fistful of Desert Blues.

In 2017 they get together once again to record a covers album called Under The Covers.

In 2019 he wrote and performed the song "The Singing Tree" for the feature film Lucania by Gigi Roccati.

== Discography ==
- Ramblin' Jeffrey Lee & Cypress Grove With Willie Love with Ramblin' Jeffrey Lee (Jeffrey Lee Pierce), 1992
- A Fistful of Desert Blues with Lydia Lunch, 2010
- Twin Horses with Lydia Lunch and Spiritual Front, 2015
- Under the Covers with Lydia Lunch, 2017

=== The Jeffrey Lee Pierce Sessions Project ===
- We Are Only Riders, 2009
- The Journey Is Long, 2012
- Axels & Sockets, 2014
- The Task Has Overwhelmed Us, 2023

== Bibliography ==
- Cave and the Seventh Art: The cinematic imagination in Kinchin-Smith S (eds) Read Write [Hand]: A Multi-Disciplinary Nick Cave Reader, Silkworms Ink, 2012, 36-38
- The Curtains Parting in Kinchin-Smith S (eds) Read Write [Hand]: A Multi-Disciplinary Nick Cave Reader, Silkworms Ink, 2012, 126-129
- Preface to Gun Club, 24 Histoires pour Jeffrey Lee Pierce
