= Congo Norvell =

American band

Congo Norvell was a band led by Kid Congo Powers (The Cramps, The Gun Club, Nick Cave and the Bad Seeds, Kid Congo Powers & the Pink Monkey Birds) and Sally Norvell (Prohibition & the Norvells). Congo Norvell formed in 1990 after Powers and Norvell met at the deathbed of a friend in Los Angeles. They embarked on a series of gigs meant to benefit friends dying of AIDS, and were noticed and signed to a record deal. They went on to record 3 studio albums (Music to Remember Him By, The Dope, the Lies, the Vaseline and Abnormals Anonymous) and multiple EPs and compilations. After having been based in LA for a few years, they relocated to New York City in 1994 and played the NYC & East Coast circuit frequently. They toured Europe and the North America, often opening for Nick Cave & the Bad Seeds.

Various incarnations of the band have included Jim Sclavunos (Nick Cave & the Bad Seeds & Grinderman), Paul Wallfisch (Little Annie, Botanica and Swans), Brian Emrich (Foetus), Kristian Hoffman (Mumps, Swinging Madisons), Mary Mullen, Joe Berardi, Keith Mitchell, Bill Bronson and Jack Martin. Singer Mark Eitzel from American Music Club was featured in duets with Norvell on 1998's Abnormals Anonymous.

== Discography ==
- Lullabies 10" (Fiasco) 1993
- Music to Remember Him By (Basura!/Priority) 1994
- Live in the Mission 7" (Triple X Records) 1995
- It Came From Beneath L.A. compilation (Triple X Records) 1995
- The Dope, the Lies, the Vaseline (Basura!/Priority) 1996
- Abnormals Anonymous (Jetset) 1998
