= Route 33 (album) =

Studio album by Charlie Pickett
- Released: 1986
- Recorded: 1985
- Genre: Roots rock
- Label: Twin/Tone
- Producer: Chris Osgood

Charlie Pickett chronology
Route 33 (1986)	Bar Band Americanus (2008)

Route 33 is an album by the American musician Charlie Pickett, released in 1986. He supported it with a North American tour.

== Production ==
The recording sessions began in early 1985, in Minneapolis, with Pickett and his former band, the Eggs, using three studios, two of which were under construction. The album was produced by Chris Osgood and engineered by Steve Fjelstad. It was initially slated for a fall 1985 release; Pickett wasn't happy with some of the tracks, and in summer 1985 rerecorded some vocals and songs, backed by Minneapolis musicians. Pickett was inspired by the Sex Pistols, Chuck Berry, Fred McDowell, Elmore James, and Son House, as well as his favorite writer, Mark Twain. Jim Duckworth played guitar on some of the tracks; Maureen Tucker contributed on drums. "Phantom Train" references the murder of Arthur McDuffie. 'Meigs County" is named for the county of Pickett's birth. "All Love All Gone" is about a man who comes to terms with the knowledge that he will never have a traditional family and home life. "Seka's Wedding" is a tribute to the pornographic actress Seka.

== Critical reception ==
Professional ratings
Review scores
Source	Rating
All Music Guide to Rock	3/5 stars
Lincoln Journal Star	3.5/5 stars
Omaha World-Herald	4.5/5 stars
The Philadelphia Inquirer	4/4 stars

The Philadelphia Inquirer called Pickett an "interesting, unpretentious music-maker" and likened him to "a younger version of Bob Seger." The Toronto Star said that "Pickett's rowdy slide guitar fairly leaps and crackles like a wicked fire, all but consuming the intelligence and wit of his lyrics and the unexcited voice with which he conveys them." The Los Angeles Times concluded, "It's easy to admire his rave-up tributes to bygone Americana, or the deadpan fatalism or, especially, the wounded romanticism. But most of his music fits somewhere between the Long Ryders and Dream Syndicate, without the urgency or spark to separate it from the pack." The Omaha World-Herald said that with "its garage-band rawness, slide guitar and howling feedback, [the album] is roots rock revisited." LA Weekly praised Route 33's "mix of blatant emotionalism, flat-out rock, and moody, gloom-laden atmosphere".

== Track listing ==
No.	Title	Length
1.	"A. on Horseback"
2.	"All Love All Gone"
3.	"Heads Up – Heels Down"
4.	"Tarwater"
5.	"Cowboy No.77"
6.	"Phantom Train"
7.	"Seka's Wedding"
8.	"Remember Every Moment"
9.	"Meigs County"
