= Fire of Love (album) =

Studio album by the Gun Club
- Released: August 31, 1981
- Studios: Studio America, Pasadena, California; Quad Teck, Los Angeles, California
- Genres: Post-punk; punk blues; gothic country; psychobilly
- Length: 40:03
- Label: Ruby
- Producers: Chris D., Tito Larriva

The Gun Club chronology
Fire of Love (1981)	Miami (1982)

Fire of Love is the debut album of the American rock band the Gun Club, released in 1981 on Ruby Records. Reviews have been highly positive, citing strong songwriting and performances which fused punk rock with blues music. Though he would later return to the band, the album does not feature founding guitarist Kid Congo Powers, who had been asked to join the Cramps in late 1980 shortly after starting the Gun Club with frontman and songwriter Jeffrey Lee Pierce.

== Production ==
Chris D., singer for the Flesh Eaters and Ruby label head, produced five tracks on the album ("Sex Beat", "Preaching the Blues", "Fire Spirit", "Ghost on the Highway" and "Jack on Fire") at Quad Teck with Pat Burnette engineering. Tito Larriva produced the album's other six tracks at Studio America with Noah Shark engineering. Chris D. was also credited with the cover design for the original release. Judith Bell was responsible for the bottle label illustrations on the rear of the cover.

== Reception ==
Professional ratings
Review scores
Source	Rating
AllMusic	5/5 stars
The Encyclopedia of Popular Music	4/5 stars
Pitchfork	9.1/10
PopMatters	8/10
The Rolling Stone Album Guide	2/5 stars
Spin Alternative Record Guide	8/10
Uncut	4/5 stars
The Village Voice	B

The album is considered groundbreaking in being the first of its kind to combine the hard, stripped-down sound of punk rock with American roots music. In turn, this innovation helped to create the punk blues style as well as inspiring countless garage rock musicians. Several musicians have cited Fire of Love as an influence, including Jack White, vocalist and guitarist of the White Stripes.

In a 1982 Trouser Press review, Jim Green argues that the band "have wrought nothing less than a mutation of the blues." He says the band "extracts from the blues those elements (anger, frustration, vivid imagery) most resonant with the disaffections of a modern young white [man]. Songwriter Pierce adds his own cynicism and wildness for a heady and often compelling combination." Green concludes, "[t]he Gun Club relies on no strict formulas yet it is undeniably the blues that is being transmuted into a medium for Pierce's dark visions and neuroses."

The album was also included in the book 1001 Albums You Must Hear Before You Die.

== Track listing ==
All songs composed by Jeffrey Lee Pierce; except where indicated

Side A

1. "Sex Beat" - 2:45
2. "Preaching the Blues" (Robert Johnson; arranged by Jeffrey Lee Pierce) - 3:58
3. "Promise Me" - 2:35
4. "She's Like Heroin to Me" - 2:33
5. "For the Love of Ivy" (Jeffrey Lee Pierce, Kid Congo Powers) - 5:31
6. "Fire Spirit" - 2:52

Side B

1. "Ghost on the Highway" - 2:43
2. "Jack on Fire" - 4:40
3. "Black Train" - 2:11
4. "Cool Drink of Water" (Tommy Johnson; traditional, arranged by Jeffrey Lee Pierce) - 6:10
5. "Goodbye Johnny" - 3:41

== Personnel ==
The Gun Club

- Jeffrey Lee Pierce - vocals, slide guitar, backing vocals on "Jack on Fire"
- Ward Dotson - guitar, slide guitar, backing vocals on "Jack on Fire"
- Rob Ritter - bass
- Terry Graham - drums

Additional musicians

- Tito Larriva - producer, violin on "Promise Me"
- Chris D. - producer, backing vocals on "Jack on Fire"
- Lois Graham - backing vocals on "Jack on Fire"

Technical

- Pat Burnette, Noah Shark - engineers
- Chris D. - cover design
- Judith Bell - bottle label drawings

== Covers ==
- In 1998, 16 Horsepower recorded a cover of "Fire Spirit" for their 1998 EP The Partisan.
- In 2003, Enon covered the song "Sex Beat".
- Juliana Hatfield's band Some Girls also covered "Sex Beat" for their 2003 album Feel It.
- Two Lone Swordsmen covered "Sex Beat" for their 2004 album From the Double Gone Chapel.
- Blanche covered "Jack on Fire" for their 2004 album If We Can't Trust the Doctors.
- Japandroids recorded a cover of "For the Love of Ivy" on their 2012 album Celebration Rock.
- In 2013, Kim Salmon and Spencer P. Jones recorded a cover of "Jack on Fire" for their album Runaways.
- In 2014, Mr. Airplane Man included a cover of "For the Love of Ivy" on their album The Lost Tapes, recorded in 1999.
- In 2021, L.A. Witch covered "Ghost on the Highway" for a split EP with the Coathangers.
