= Music to Remember Him By =

Studio album by Congo Norvell
- Released: 1994
- Genre: Alternative rock, cabaret
- Label: Basura!/Priority
- Producer: Congo Norvell, Mick Harvey

Congo Norvell chronology
Lullabies EP (1993)	Music to Remember Him By (1994)	The Dope, the Lies, the Vaseline (1996)

Music to Remember Him By is an album by the American band Congo Norvell. It was released in 1994. The band was led by Sally Norvell and Kid Congo Powers; the pair met via their involvement in Wim Wenders projects.

== Production ==
The album was produced by Congo Norvell and Mick Harvey; their intention was to integrate cabaret and exotica into a rock sound. Its songs are largely about friends lost to AIDS. Music to Remember Him By was recorded in Joshua Tree and Echo Park.

== Critical reception ==
Professional ratings
Review scores
Source	Rating
AllMusic	3/5 stars
MusicHound Rock: The Essential Album Guide	3/5 stars

Trouser Press wrote that "the postmodern coffee-house feel is, at times, an uncomfortably kitschy mix, but it's creepy and compelling just the same." Stereo Review thought that Norvell and Powers "conjure a darkly poetic atmosphere redolent of Kurt Weill, Leonard Cohen, Nico-era Velvets—you know, the real spooky-cool stuff." The Toronto Star praised "the David Lynchian dreamscape in the tunes."

The Washington Post called the album "skillfully atmospheric stuff, although the melodrama of tracks like 'Mercy Mine' just narrowly skirts silliness." The Philadelphia Inquirer noted "the gothic torch and twang of Powers and haunting vocals by chanteuse Sally Norvell." The Boston Globe deemed Congo Norvell's sound "seductive [and] alluring, with blues and gospel elements." The Boston Herald concluded that Congo Norvell's "quiet and seductive cabaret melancholia both soothes and chills, sending shivers up your spine while messing with your psyche."

AllMusic wrote that "Norvell's singing, a low, sassy croon, shows she knows her jazz/blues roots well, bringing the appropriately passionate intensity to the group that it needs."

== Track listing ==
No.	Title	Length
1.	"Golden Gates"
2.	"Drift Away"
3.	"The Chosen One"
4.	"Mercy Mine"
5.	"Rock My Child"
6.	"My Midnight"
7.	"Long Time Woman"
8.	"Shelter"
9.	"Lola"
10.	"Dried Flowers"
11.	"Love"
12.	"Lonesome Valley"
