= Lucky Jim (album) =

Studio album by the Gun Club
- Released: 1993
- Recorded: January 1992 – February 1993
- Studios: Bananas, Haarlem, Netherlands; "Blue Monsoons" Studio Zeezicht, Spaarnwoude, Netherlands
- Genres: Blues; alternative rock
- Labels: Triple X New Rose
- Producers: Jeffrey Lee Pierce, Peer Rave

The Gun Club chronology
Divinity (1991)	Lucky Jim (1993)	Live in Europe (1993)

Lucky Jim is the seventh and final studio album by the American rock band the Gun Club, released in 1993. The album is "dedicated to the cities of Saigon and London, Fall and Winter 1991".

== Production ==
The album was recorded in Holland, with the band made up of Jeffrey Lee Pierce, Romi Mori and Nick Sanderson. Bart Van Poppel played organ during the recording sessions.

== Critical reception ==
Professional ratings
Review scores
Source	Rating
AllMusic	4/5 stars
The Encyclopedia of Popular Music	3/5 stars
MusicHound Rock: The Essential Album Guide	3.5/5 stars
Spin Alternative Record Guide	7/10

Trouser Press called the album "an eerily austere record that displays the more spectral side of Pierce's voice, particularly on the dejected title track and 'Cry to Me' ... the manner in which he replaces post-adolescent rage with full-blown adult emptiness is mighty impressive." Billboard deemed it "a haunting record that reflected Pierce's experiences in Japan and Vietnam, countries to which he traveled several times in the early '90s." The Morning Call noted that "the tempos are slower, the song structures are more dynamic ... and there is an increased attention to melody and texture."

AllMusic wrote that Lucky Jim "didn't just signify the passage of a man, but the disappearance of the only real American rock band left in the world." The Spin Alternative Record Guide concluded that, "if the Gun Club's execution on the elegiac Lucky Jim directly recalls the Delta only once ('Anger Blues'), the album is permeated with a sadness and displacement fundamental to the deep blues." Record Collector deemed the songs "gutbucket blues and melancholy acoustic outings," writing that "Pierce found a new kind of intimate personal blues towards the end."

== Track listing ==
All tracks are written by Jeffrey Lee Pierce, except where noted.

No.	Title	Writer(s)	Length
1.	"Lucky Jim"		3:44
2.	"A House Is Not a Home"		4:04
3.	"Cry to Me"		5:56
4.	"Kamata Hollywood City"		5:09
5.	"Ride"		3:57
6.	"Idiot Waltz"		6:44
7.	"Up Above the World"		4:50
8.	"Day Turn the Night"		2:56
9.	"Blue Monsoons"	Romi Mori	2:53
10.	"Desire"		5:10
11.	"Anger Blues"		7:45

== Personnel ==
Gun Club

- Jeffrey Lee Pierce – vocals, lead guitar, arrangements
- Romi Mori – bass
- Nick Sanderson – drums

with:

- Bart Van Poppel – organ on "Cry to Me" and "Anger Blues"
- Simon Fish – drums on "Blue Monsoons"
