= Lucania (film) =

- Directed by: Gigi Roccati
- Screenplay by: Carlo Longo, Gigi Roccati, Gino Ventriglia
- Story by: Carlo Longo and Gigi Roccati
- Produced by: Fabrique Entertainment, Moliwood Films, Rai Cinema
- Starring: Giovanni Capalbo; Angela Fontana; Pippo Delbono; Maia Morgenstern; Marco Leonardi
- Music by: Gabriele Bonolis, Cypress Grove, Antonio Infantino
- Distributed by: 102 Distribution
- Release date: June 20, 2019
- Country: Italy
- Language: Italian

Lucania is a 2019 film directed by Gigi Roccati, produced by Fabrique Entertainment, Moliwood Films and Rai Cinema, with the contribution of MiBAC, and the support of the Lucana Film Commission. The film stars Giovanni Capalbo, Angela Fontana, Pippo Delbono, Maia Morgenstern, and guest star Marco Leonardi. Story and screenplay are by Carlo Longo and Gigi Roccati.

== Plot ==
In the Basilicata region of Italy, Rocco, is a severe farmer who fights incessantly for his land, lives with his daughter Lucia, a girl raised like a savage, with no education that has become mute after her mother, Argenzia's death. Lucia seems to be in contact with her mother but Rocco misunderstands her "dialogues with the wind" as a form of madness and turns to a peasant scorceress to cure Lucia.

The situation completely overturns when Rocco is offered the possibility to earn money in exchange for burying toxic waste in his land. Rocco refuses and is threatened. While escaping an aggression, he kills one of the thugs. Rocco and Lucia have to escape and they begin a long journey through a hard and dying land where Rocco will try to find redemption and Lucia, forced to abandon the memory of her mother, will find her voice again and become a woman. In the end she will help her father as well.
