= Open Books & Records =

Coordinates: 25.9278°N 80.2011°W

Open Books & Records was founded by Ted Gottfried and Leslie Wimmer. The original store opened its door in October 1979 in Deerfield Beach, Florida, United States. The store's location changed several times finally ending up in North Miami Beach, Florida.

Open Books & Records closed its doors in March, 1994.

== Core of the scene ==
Open Books and Records played an important role in the South Florida underground scene. The original store was located in Deerfield Beach, Florida. According to Walter CZ, "without Leslie, without Ted Gottfried putting together Open Records, we wouldn’t be sitting here right now, because everybody that’s here saw these little ads in the magazine for this weird little record store in Deerfield Beach that had the records we were looking for. Oh my god, ya know, and sure enough by going up there, you were immediately in touch with all these other people and it just became the hub. It was the core." According to Richard Shelter, "They promoted so many shows, I mean without Open Records…it was my channel to get everybody to know..."

Open Books and Records moved to Fort Lauderdale in 1981. In early 1982, Wimmer and Gottfried decided to start making record albums and Open Records came into being. According to Greg Baker, "On two nights in January 1982 they recorded Charlie Pickett and the Eggs Live at the Button on Fort Lauderdale Beach." At the same time "Open compiled an album featuring fifteen bands from Florida, including the Eat, the Bobs, the Essentials, Spanish Dogs, the Front, Larry Joe Miller, and Charlie Pickett and the Eggs. The result was a remarkable piece of vinyl that stands up to this day. It didn't sell diddley."

Open Books and Records was more than a record store. They had a record label, they put on shows, and they had a hotline called "Song and Dance."

== Open Records ==
Open Records was a label created by Ted Gottfried and Leslie Wimmer owners of Open Records & Books. Gottfried and Wimmer released several Charlie Pickett singles as well as a compilation album titled The Land That Time Forgot. According to Bob Suren, "This 1982 LP is truly a regional sampler, with bands of all styles from all over the state represented, including the Eat, the Bobs, the Essentials, the Front, the Spanish Dogs and many more."

- The Land That Time Forgot - 1982.
- Charlie Pickett & The Eggs - "Feelin'" / "White Light" 7" - 1981.
- Charlie Pickett & The Eggs - Live at The Button (LP)- 1982.
- Charlie Pickett & The Eggs - Cowboy Junkie Au-Go_Go (EP) - 1984.
