= Rob Graves (guitarist) =

- Born: 1955; Detroit, Michigan
- Died: June 28, 1990 New York City, New York
- Genres: Punk rock, post-punk, cowpunk, punk blues, horror punk, deathrock, gothic rock
- Instrument: Bass guitar
- Formerly of: The Exterminators, Bags, the Gun Club, 45 Grave, Thelonious Monster, the Loafin' Hyenas

Rob Graves (1955 – June 28, 1990), also known as Rob Ritter, was an American guitarist and bassist, born in Detroit, Michigan. Graves was known for his work in the 1970s and 1980s punk scene in Los Angeles, performing with Bags, the Gun Club, 45 Grave, Thelonious Monster and the Loafin' Hyenas. Prior to relocating to LA in February 1978, Graves had played in Phoenix punk band the Exterminators.

Graves died in 1990 from a heroin overdose. Graves' death had a profound impact on the punk rock community, prompting Courtney Love to dedicate Hole's Pretty on the Inside to him. A 1990 memorial concert was held for Graves at the Roxy in West Hollywood, featuring three of the bands he had performed in.

== Discography ==
=== Studio albums ===
- The Gun Club – Fire of Love (1981)
- The Gun Club – Miami (1982)
- 45 Grave – Sleep in Safety (1983)
- Thelonious Monster – Stormy Weather (1989)
- The Loafin' Hyenas – The Loafin' Hyenas (1991)

=== Compilation albums ===
- 45 Grave – Autopsy (1987)

=== Live albums ===
- 45 Grave – Only the Good Die Young (1989, Restless)
- Decline of Western Civilization soundtrack - with Alice Bag Band - Gluttony (1981, Slash)
