= The Las Vegas Story (album) =

1984 studio album by The Gun Club

Studio album LP by the Gun Club
- Released: June 1984
- Recorded: March–April 1984
- Studios: Ocean Way, Hollywood, California
- Genre: Post-punk
- Length: 35:16
- Label: Animal
- Producer: Jeff Eyrich

The Gun Club chronology
Death Party EP (1983)	The Las Vegas Story (1984)	Mother Juno (1987)

Professional ratings
Review scores
Source	Rating
AllMusic	4/5 stars
Classic Rock	8/10 stars
Mojo	4/5 stars

The Las Vegas Story is the third studio album by American rock band the Gun Club, released in 1984. This album saw the return of founding member and lead guitarist Kid Congo Powers, after a three-year stint with the Cramps. The album was dedicated to Debbie Harry "for her love, help and encouragement."

== Track listing ==
All songs composed by Jeffrey Lee Pierce, except where indicated

Side one
No.	Title	Length
1.	"The Las Vegas Story"	0:23
2.	"Walkin' with the Beast"	4:30
3.	"Eternally Is Here"	3:02
4.	"The Stranger in Our Town"	5:10
5.	"My Dreams"	4:01
Total length:		17:06

Side two
No.	Title	Music	Length
1.	"The Master Plan"	Leon Thomas, Pharoah Sanders	1:50
2.	"My Man's Gone Now"	DuBose Heyward, George Gershwin	3:14
3.	"Bad America"		4:56
4.	"Moonlight Motel"		3:08
5.	"Give Up the Sun"		6:02
Total length:			19:10

Cassette edition bonus track
No.	Title	Length
1.	"Secret Fires"	2:34
Total length:		2:34

== Personnel ==
The Gun Club

- Jeffrey Lee Pierce – vocals, guitars, bells, musical tube, montage and piano on "The Master Plan"
- Kid Congo Powers – excessive feedback, guitar and slide guitar, whirling whirlies, maracas and ancient mutterings
- Patricia Morrison – bass, backing vocals, maracas and Bacardi
- Terry Graham – drums

Additional musicians

- Mustang Dave Alvin – lead guitar on "Eternally Is Here" and "The Stranger in Our Town"
- The Synanon Reeds (Lois Graham and Phast Phreddie Patterson) – wooden recorders on "The Master Plan"
- uncredited (possibly Rafael Ferro) – piano on "My Man's Gone Now"
- uncredited (possibly Christian and Bobby Williams) – backing vocals on "My Man's Gone Now"

Production

- Jeff Eyrich – producer
- Mark Ettel – engineer
- Judy Clapp – assistant engineer
- Bernie Grundman – mastering
- Gillian Titus – art direction, design
- Tom Campbell – front cover photograph
