= Tex & the Horseheads =

- Origin: Los Angeles, California, United States
- Genres: Punk rock, punk blues, cowpunk, deathrock
- Years active: 1980–1986; 2007–present
- Label: Enigma Records

Tex & the Horseheads is an American punk rock band, which emerged in the Los Angeles punk subculture of the early-1980s. They were described as "passionately committed and intense in delivery" in a 1984 review by The Washington Post. During their original run from 1980 to 1986 they enjoyed a sizeable cult following. As of 2007, the band has reunited and tours the Los Angeles area sporadically.

== Biography ==
Tex & the Horseheads are often cited as among the first bands to play "cowpunk." The sound of Tex & the Horseheads, and correspondingly the sound of cowpunk, is characterized by a fusion of classic-styled country-and-Western music and street-tough LA punk bands.

Tex & the Horseheads set themselves apart by appropriating aesthetical and fashion elements from deathrock bands like Burning Image, 45 Grave, and Christian Death. Tex & the Horseheads' members include: Texacala Jones, Mike Martt, Gregory "Smog Boaz" and David "Rock Vodka” Thum. Jeffrey Lee Pierce, of The Gun Club, was an original member of the group and was highly influential in supporting its formation.

Tex and the Horseheads released two records, a self-titled record in 1984 and Life's So Cool, produced in 1985 by John Doe, member of X and of the Flesh Eaters. A live album, titled Tot Ziens; Live in Holland, was released by Enigma Records in 1986.

Their songs dealt with themes of heartbreak, love, drug and alcohol dependency, grief, loss, and financial difficulty—all a testament to their destitute roll-and-tumble lifestyle, as well as Texacala' s real-life struggles with alcohol and heroin in the latter half of the 1980s.

== Collaborations ==
Until disappearing from the Los Angeles music scene in the 1990s, Texacala performed with all-girl cowpunk group, the Screaming Sirens. In 1987 she formed Texorcist along w/ Dave Catching on Guitar, Billy Koepke on Bass & Louie Dufau on Drums, In the late 1980s, Texacala participated in an all women's performance troupe of LA scene-makers, The Ringling Sisters, whose members all fronted Los Angeles based bands. Members of the group included Pleasant Gehman (Screamin' Sirens), Iris Berry (Lame Flames), Debbie Dexter (Devil Squares), Debbie Patino (Raszebrae) and Johnette Napolitano (Concrete Blonde). Tex's role in The Ringling Sisters involved performing as a story teller and back-up singer.

Texacala recorded a solo record in 1998, and subsequently toured extensively with a backing band the TJ Hookers, as well as fronting Texorcist and working with Los Platos. In 1994 she formed Burnin' Bridges along with former Texorcist Bassist Billy Koepke. They recorded 10 songs for a planned record with Richie Ramone producing but the record was never released.

== Reunion and future plans ==
In 2007, Tex & the Horseheads reunited and played shows around the LA area. Texacala has since moved to Austin, Texas and has remained active in music there.

Texacala has stated that she plans to write a book detailing her experiences as a musician. She has also stated that she plans to "have some new songs coming out on itunes and plan on putting them all on cd soon for the website I'm working on. I want to make as many of my recordings available as possible, posters, flyers."
