= The Cichlids =

American band

Formed in early 1979, The Cichlids were composed of Debbie DeNeese on vocals and guitar, Bobby Tak on drums and vocals, Allan Portman on guitar and vocals, and Susan Robins on bass.

"The act was widely considered one of the first alternative Florida acts who could have (should have) made it, and 1980's Be True To Your School is the crowning achievement of its short tenure."

"As the story goes, The Cichlids made their debut in 1979 and became an overnight local sensation. Trying to cash in on the current trend in punk rock, disco label TK records signed The Cichlids, but sadly enough, internal conflicts caused the band to break up shortly after the album was released." The Cichlids were the first (and only) rock band signed to Miami's TK Records who were known as a Disco label.

== Members ==
- Debbie DeNeese (vocals and guitar)
- Bobby Tak (drums and vocals)
- Allan Portman (guitar and vocals)
- Susan Robins (bass)

== Releases ==
- Lifeguard Dan (EP)
- Be True to Your School
- Straight Outta Dania

== Reviews ==
- Be True to Your School: "the record is non-stop energy from the moment the needle drops into the groove on side A, until it picks up from the end of side B. comparisons may range from early blondie to the rezillos to x-ray spex to the runaways with a sneaky touch of beach boys added in there somewhere as well. fans of female-fronted punk will not be disappointed!"
