= Patricia Morrison =

American musician (born 1962)

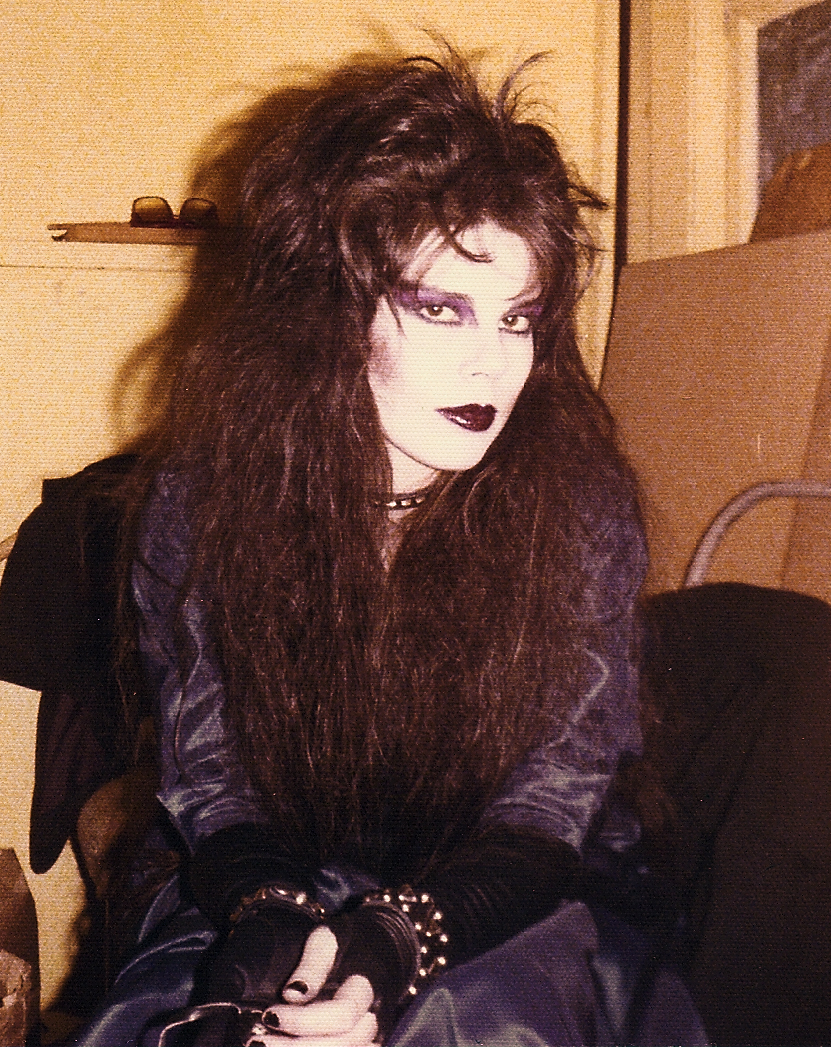
- Morrison circa 1978

Background information
- Also known as: Pat Bag
- Born: Patricia Anne Rainone; January 14, 1962 (age 64); Los Angeles, California, U.S.
- Genres: Punk rock, gothic rock, punk blues
- Instruments: Bass guitar, vocals
- Years active: 1976–2004, 2019
- Formerly of: Bags; Legal Weapon; The Gun Club; Fur Bible; The Sisters of Mercy; The Damned

Patricia Anne Rainone (born January 14, 1962), better known by her stage name Patricia Morrison, is an American bass guitarist, singer and songwriter. She has worked with Bags, the Gun Club, Fur Bible, the Sisters of Mercy, and the Damned.

== Biography ==
Patricia Anne Rainone was born January 14, 1962, and grew up in Los Angeles, California. She had an early interest in music, reporting that: "When I was 12 years old, I saved up every cent to buy a guitar. I went to the guitar shop and realized I could afford the guitar, but not the lessons.... So I walk out of the store empty handed, a decision I will always regret." She was a founding member of the Bags.

Rainone and Alicia Armendariz, a.k.a. Alice Bag, met at school and formed their first band, Femme Fatale, in '1975 /1976', later re-named Masque Era. Morrison said: "I started a band with two girlfriends in our late teens, then punk showed up and that decided my future. I had very little to do with it, I wanted to be a veterinarian, but couldn't afford it." Initially guided by glitter and glam, though enamoured by punk music, they played a few local gigs. A 1977 concert featuring the Germs inspired them to move toward a more punk sound, and to form the Bags, with Janet Koontz joining them on guitar. The band wore bags over their heads onstage. Morrison recalls: "The Bags were playing somewhere very early on and my mother came running out of the driveway yelling 'Patricia you forgot your bag!' My mother making sure I had a bag to put over my head is a special moment in time." They released a single, Survive, in 1978, but Morrison left the following year after a falling out with Alice Bag. She graduated from high school in 1979, and went on to co-found Legal Weapon with Kat Arthur in 1980, performing under the mononym "Patericia". The group released an EP called No Sorrow in 1981. In the same year she assumed the surname Morrison after marrying Rick Morrison of Catholic Discipline.

Morrison left Legal Weapon and joined the Gun Club in 1982, after persuasion from former Bags drummer Terry Graham. She played bass on their 1984 album The Las Vegas Story, and was one of the longer serving band members, before leaving after her second tour in late 1984. Morrison cites that although there were great times playing with the Gun Club and writing songs with singer Jeffrey Lee Pierce, ultimately she found it frustrating due to Pierce's uncooperative approach to business and his self-sabotaging tendencies; "realizing Jeffrey was his own worst enemy and despite loving the band it was going nowhere and I was finding it hard to watch".

At the start of 1985 and now living in London, Morrison formed the band Fur Bible with guitarist Kid Congo Powers, who had also exited the Gun Club after their 1984 UK tour. They also invited Tex Perkins, vocalist with Australian band Beasts of Bourbon, having met him on the Gun Club's 1983 tour. Tex duly travelled to the UK to join them but was denied entry as he had not secured the necessary visa prior to leaving Australia. Fur Bible then played a short tour in Holland as backing band, with Morrison wearing a blonde Dolly Parton wig onstage, to the Legendary Stardust Cowboy, in order to reimburse the Dutch promoter who had paid for Tex's travel. Congo Powers had work permit issues which kept him in Amsterdam until June, by which time Tex was finally able to join them in London. However, it proved unsuccessful and Tex returned to Australia. Fur Bible released one vinyl EP, Plunder the Tombs, and embarked on a two-month tour opening for Siouxsie and the Banshees' 'Cities In Dust' tour. Fur Bible's final concert was in Maastricht in March 1986; the band had a further sixty dates lined up, but during the Banshees tour Morrison had been invited by Andrew Eldritch to join the Sisters of Mercy (who had supported the Gun Club on their 1983 UK tour), and she left Fur Bible. Kid Congo Powers accepted an offer to join Nick Cave and the Bad Seeds.

Morrison played on the 1986 album Gift (released under the group name the Sisterhood) and appeared playing bass on promo videos for the Sisters of Mercy's 1987 album Floodland, though did not play on the album itself. According to Jennifer Park:

[T]he choice of Patricia Morrison as bassist - beginning with her work on Floodland (1987) - was not a decision made without weighing its aesthetic value. Music videos and promotional photographs showcased the perfect goth pin-up girl with her high arched eyebrows, black eyeliner, blood-red lips, teased-out hair, long black nails, and fetish-meets-renaissance wardrobe.

The Sisters of Mercy song "Lucretia My Reflection" was written by Eldritch about Morrison. The lyric compares her to the historical figure Lucrezia Borgia. Asked about her favourite memory from the Sisters of Mercy, Morrison recalled, "Petra, riding my little Arabian horse throughout the magnificent city"; this on location for the video shoot of Dominion. She left the band at the end of 1989, claiming money owed by Eldritch was not paid.

Due to an ongoing lawsuit with Eldritch, Morrison temporarily ceased working as a musician and instead became a motorcycle courier in London, later telling one interviewer; "I made more money than when I was with Sisters of Mercy, hahaha!". It ended when the bike was stolen, but by then Morrison was returning to music, and in 1994 released a solo album, Reflect on This. She put together a band and played a three month European tour, but found some of the musicians lacked the necessary commitment, and dissolved the group on return to the UK.

Morrison had been friends with, and a musical fan of, The Damned for "many years", and in 1996 Captain Sensible suggested she join them to replace bassist Paul Gray, who had been injured by a beer glass thrown from the audience during a concert. The same year Morrison married the Damned's lead singer Dave Vanian in Las Vegas. Morrison played on The Damned's first album release in fifteen years, 2001's Grave Disorder, stating in one interview; "It is the only recording I have ever played on that I am happy with and can listen to without wishing most of it were different." As well as extensive touring with the band, she also took responsibility for arranging appearances and concerts. In 2005, after giving birth to the couple's child the previous year, Morrison officially retired from The Damned.

In 2019, Morrison provided the voice of the character Annabelle on horror punk band Creeper's second album, Sex, Death & the Infinite Void. Morrison appeared on the opening and closing tracks ("A Shadow Stirs" and "Pavor Nocturnus") of Creeper's 2025 album Sanguivore II: Mistress of Death.

== See also ==
- List of bass guitarists
