= Richard Shelter =

American iconic figure

Richard Shelter is an American iconic figure, who changed South Florida's culture in the mid-1980s. Richard Shelter was an integral part of the South Florida punk rock scene. Shelter moved to Miami in 1978, and eventually started promoting punk and hardcore shows featuring local bands in clubs such as 27 Birds. According to the Miami New Times, "Shelter took over the club 27 Birds to offer great rock shows by local bands. He booked national acts such as the Ramones and Dead Kennedys at the then-forlorn, now-bustling Cameo Theatre. Later he fronted his own band, the Preachers, whose guitarist, Nick Kane, would later side for Iko-Iko and recently joined the Mavericks."

== Musician ==
Shelter was a musician as well as a promoter. When he first moved to Miami he was in a band called Sluggo.

Shelter was road manager for Charlie Pickett & the Eggs' cross-country US tour in 1984-1985. He also formed his own band, The Preachers, and served as frontman/lead singer. The Preachers released a self-titled album in 1986.

== Post Miami ==
Richard Shelter left Miami in 1987 and moved to California.
