= Route 33 (group) =

Australian county duo

- Origin: Queensland, Australia
- Genres: Country
- Years active: 2016–present
- Members: Jock Barnes; Trent McArdle
- Website: https://www.route33.au

Route 33 are an Australian country duo made up of Jock Barnes and Trent McArdle.

They released their debut single, "Last First Kiss" in November 2016. In October 2024, they released their third studio album Chapters.

== Discography ==
=== Albums ===
List of studio albums with selected details and peak chart positions
Title	Details	Peak chart positions
Title	Details	AUS
The Switch	Released: February 2017; Label: Route 33	59
Coro Drive.	Released: 9 August 2019; Label: Route 33, Social Family Records	26
Chapters	Released: 18 October 2024; Label: Route 33, RTC	62
