= Charlie Pickett (musician) =

American singer and guitarist (born 1953)

Charlie Pickett (born 1953) is an American singer and guitarist, known as frontman for rock bands from Florida, most notably in the 1980s. In Rolling Stone, David Fricke described Pickett's music as "a brawling-roots mix of Johnny Thunders, Sun Records and trailer park Lou Reed in Florida bars."

== Early life ==
Pickett was born in Athens, Ohio in 1953. He moved with his family to Hollywood, Florida at age two.

Pickett started playing guitar at age 18. He enrolled at the University of Florida to "study political science, but quit school in his senior year to get married. The marriage didn't last, and 'too depressed to go back to school,' Pickett took a job running a front-end loader at a construction site."

== Career ==
Pickett formed a band called Charlie Pickett and the Eggs in the late 1970s. The most prominent lineup included guitarist Johnny Salton, bassist/vocalist/co-writer Dave Froshnider, and drummer Johnny "Sticks" Galway. The local scene included bands such as the Eat, the Cichlids, Z-Cars, and the Kids. The latter featured future star actor Johnny Depp, then a teenager.

The Eggs started as a cover band but developed original songs. In 1981, Open Records released two singles by the band. In a 1982 Trouser Press review of the second single, Jim Green described "If This Is Love, Can I Get My Money Back" as "snidely humorous roots rock" and said the song "would be at home on a Dave Edmunds LP." Green called the cover of the Flamin' Groovies song "Slow Death" which appears on the B-side a "gem," stating that it is "[t]he best version since the Groovies own—maybe even comparable to theirs." Green credits the Eggs for creating "a stark sonic setting...highlighted by...[Pickett's] scorching slide guitar."

The Eggs' debut album, Live at the Button, was released in 1982 on Open Records, a local label in Miami associated with Open Books & Records. It was well reviewed by England's music weekly, Melody Maker. In his book about Jerry Lee Lewis, author Joe Bonomo called Live at the Button "a great record, well recorded and full of loose, shoddy bar-band rock & roll." Bonomo called the cover of "Shake Some Action" by the Flamin' Groovies the record's highlight — "sloppy, anthemic, authentic, and frightening."

An EP, Cowboy Junkie Au-Go-Go (also on Open Records), followed in 1984. It won praise from respected rock writer Robert Christgau of The Village Voice, who called it "ace country-punk." As a 2008 retrospective in the Miami New Times noted, "By the mid-Eighties, Pickett ruled the local rock scene."

Pickett signed with Twin/Tone Records, then known as home of Soul Asylum and the Replacements. In 1986, he issued his sole album for Twin/Tone, Route 33. It "was well received but never reached the wider audience that the label and band had hoped for." Jim Duckworth, who had previously played with the Gun Club, played guitar on the album, along with Froshnider and Chris Osgood.

Pickett and his band played together with R.E.M., which was breaking through to superstardom in the 1980s. R.E.M.'s guitarist, Peter Buck, formed a lasting friendship with Pickett. Buck was producer and guest guitarist on the 1988 album by Charlie Pickett and the MC3, The Wilderness (issued by Safety Net Records). Trouser Press observed, "Salton's blistering blues-based guitar excitement provides fiery encouragement for Pickett’s plain and emotional singing, which, at times, recalls Neil Young's mournful country wail."

The Wilderness also did not sell well. A discouraged Pickett quit music following a final tour in 1988 with Salton, Galway, and new bassist Marco Pettit. He then went to law school and became an attorney.

According to Johnny Salton, "Charlie just stopped too soon. We were on the cusp of making it. We were ahead of that whole alt-country thing."

Indeed, in 2008, the "insurgent country" label Bloodshot Records issued a compilation of Pickett's work with his various bands called Bar Band Americanus. Bloodshot's head, Rob Miller, had seen a 1985 show by Pickett in Michigan, and it made a deep impression on him. Miller said, "It's not a stretch to say that Charlie Pickett and the Eggs — and a few other bands like X, Knitters, and the Meat Puppets — made Bloodshot possible."

Following this release, Pickett continued to play occasional gigs in the Miami area. He issued a new album called See You in Miami in 2018. The "remarkable, rollicking comeback" had old friend Peter Buck as a featured guest.

== Discography ==
=== Charlie Pickett & The Eggs ===
- Feelin' b/w White Light/White Heat (Open, 1981). This seven-inch single was the first release by Open Records.
- If This Is Love, Can I Get My Money Back? b/w Slow Death (Open, 1981)
- Roosterin' with Intant - track B4 on Jukebox compilation (Jeterboy, 1982)
- Live at the Button (Open, 1982)
- Cowboy Junkie Au Go-Go (Open, 1984)

=== Charlie Pickett ===
- Route 33 (Twin/Tone, 1986)
- Bar Band Americanus (Bloodshot, 2008). The Route 33 material was remastered and the sound was vastly improved.
- See You in Miami (Y&T Music, 2018)

=== Charlie Pickett & The MC3 ===
- The Wilderness (Safety Net, 1988)
