= Kid Congo Powers =

American musician

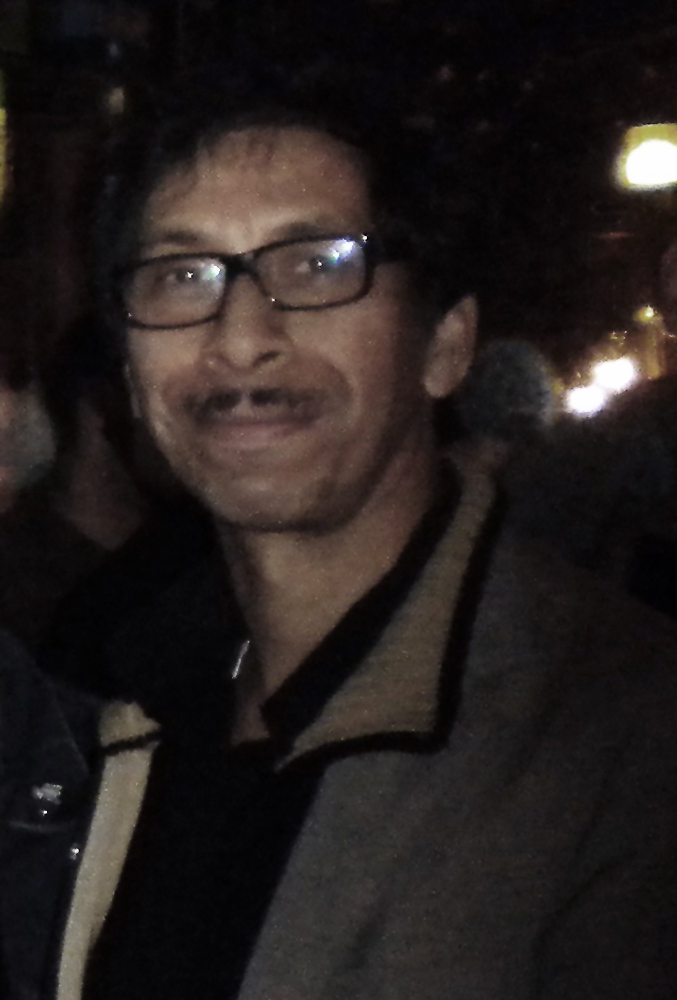
- Kid Congo Powers in 2009

Background information
- Born: Brian Tristan; March 27, 1959 (age 67); La Puente, California, U.S.
- Genres: Punk rock; post-punk; alternative rock; garage rock
- Occupation: Musician
- Instruments: Guitar; piano; keyboards; vocals
- Years active: 1979–present
- Label: Mute
- Website: kidcongopowers.blogspot.com

Brian Tristan (born March 27, 1959), better known by his stage name Kid Congo Powers, is an American rock guitarist, singer, and actor best known as a member of the Gun Club, the Cramps and Nick Cave and the Bad Seeds. He has also played with the Divine Horsemen, the Angels of Light, Die Haut, and Knoxville Girls.

As of January 2015, Powers' primary musical project is the band the Pink Monkey Birds.

== Early life ==
Born in La Puente, California, Powers is a second generation Mexican American. His earliest childhood influences were the Southern California Chicano rock band Thee Midniters. In 1976, he started an unofficial West Coast Ramones fan club, later starting another fan club and fanzine for the Screamers at the band's behest. After witnessing first-wave UK punk for himself on a class trip to Europe in August 1977, Powers moved from his family home to a series of West Hollywood crash pads in order to fully immerse himself in that city's own nascent punk scene. Initially having no inclination to make music himself, he contributed to a number of punk fanzines while working day jobs at a series of local record stores.

== Career ==
=== 1979–1987: The Gun Club and the Cramps ===
In August 1979 Powers became acquainted with Jeffrey Lee Pierce while waiting in line for a Pere Ubu show; during that initial meeting Pierce talked Powers into starting a new band with him. As Powers had no interest in singing, Pierce taught him to play guitar using open tuning, and they formed the Gun Club (settling on the name after one show as "Creeping Ritual"). In late 1980, not long after the new band had started gigging, Powers was asked to join the Cramps (then newly relocated to Los Angeles), resulting in his departure from the Gun Club prior to the recording of their debut album Fire of Love. It was upon joining the Cramps that the "Kid Congo Powers" moniker came into being, synthesized from the label copy of a Santería candle by frontman Lux Interior to give the new member his "Cramps name". Though Powers had wanted to incorporate his real first name Brian into the new stage name, the Cramps nixed the idea to avoid any associations with founding guitarist Bryan Gregory, who Powers was replacing.

After leaving the Cramps in 1983, Powers rejoined the Gun Club briefly, touring Australia with them the following year, and then rejoined on a longer-term basis from 1985 to 1988.

=== 1986–1996: Nick Cave and the Bad Seeds, the Gun Club reunion, Congo Norvell ===
Powers joined Nick Cave and the Bad Seeds in Berlin, Germany, September 1986 initially as a short-term replacement for Hugo Race. Powers ultimately recorded and toured with the Bad Seeds for four years. Powers recorded the albums Tender Prey (1988) and The Good Son (1990) with Cave and his band. Powers recalled in early 2015 that he "loved" the "primaeval element of rock'n'roll" expressed by the band.

During April 1990 Powers amicably left the Bad Seeds to rejoin The Gun Club, which he had reconvened with Jeffrey Lee Pierce in 1989. Powers was active with the Gun Club until their 1996 dissolution, and Pierce died in 1996.

Parallel to his final stint in the Gun Club, Powers formed Congo Norvell with vocalist Sally Norvell. The band explored a fusion of cabaret and rock styles from 1993 to 1998, and released three full-length albums.

=== 1997–2009: The Pink Monkey Birds and Dracula Boots ===
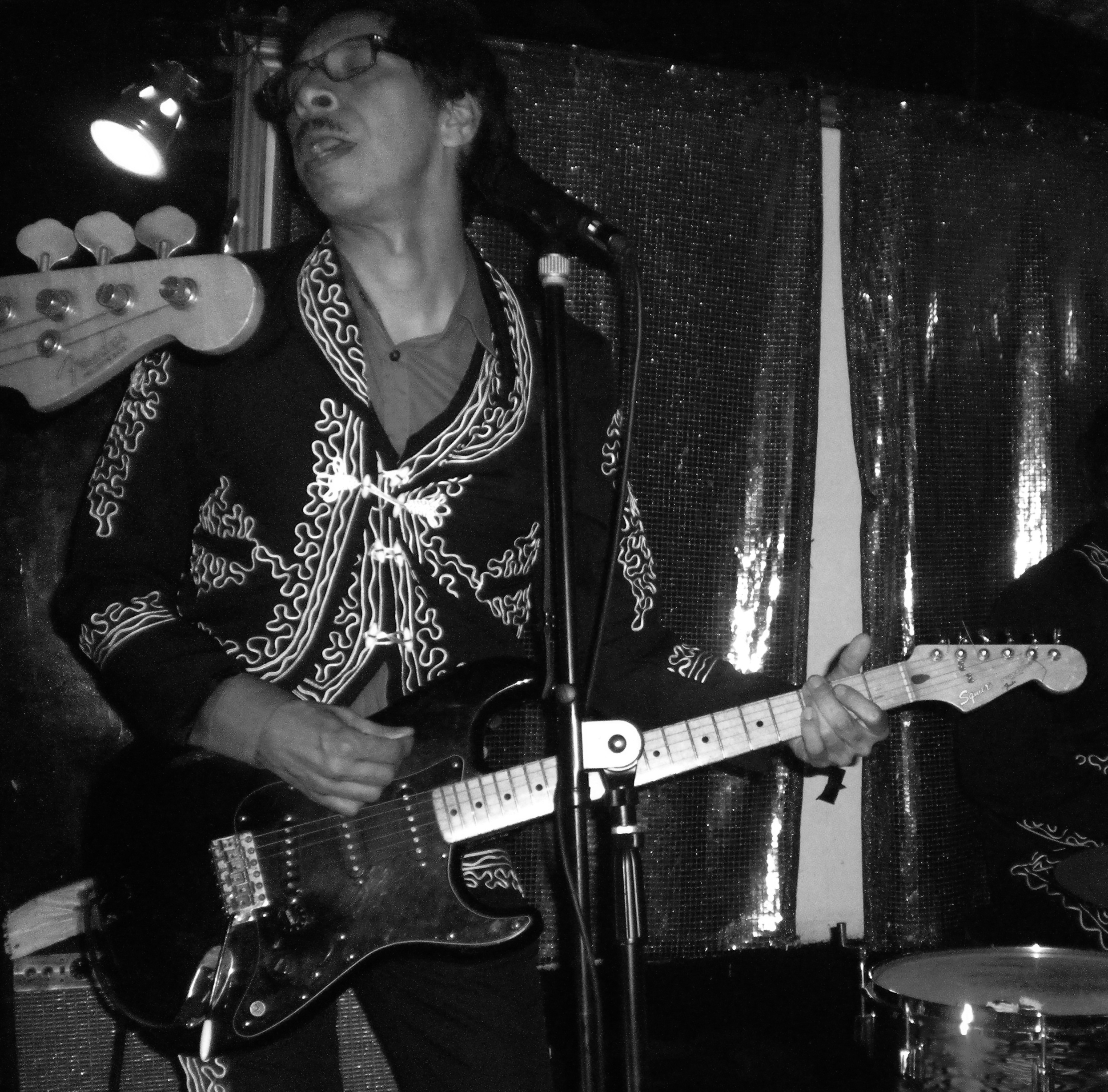
Kid Congo Powers performing in 2009

For his next project, The Pink Monkey Birds, Powers initially collaborated with New York City guitarist Jack Martin, who he has also collaborated with for the Congo Norvell and Knoxville Girls projects. Then, in 2009, Powers recruited Kiki Solis on bass, Ron Miller on drums, and Jesse Roberts on guitar and keyboards. The band moved to In The Red Records and released the much acclaimed debut studio album, Dracula Boots, which was called a "return to form."

Dracula Boots was coproduced by Jason Ward and recorded in a former high school gymnasium in Harveyville, Kansas, which is now an artists' retreat called "The Harveyville Project." Dracula Boots consists of numerous genres, including southern soul, 60s Chicano rock, and psychedelic imagery. British magazine N.M.E. wrote: "In short, on Dracula Boots Kid Congo Powers has once again found the juicy jugular of soul-fired, funked-up rock'n'roll. You'd be foolish not to take a bite."

=== 2010–present: Gorilla Rose ===
In 2011, Kid Congo and The Pink Monkey Birds released their second album, Gorilla Rose, which was also on the In The Red Records label. Eamon Carr of The Dublin Evening Herald said of Gorilla Rose, "Having a working band is paying off. Gorilla Rose elevates seedy go-go weirdness to the level of high art."

Powers returned to Australia for the first time in 25 years—when he toured with Cave's Bad Seeds project—at the end of January 2015. The band played at Melbourne's "Summersalt Festival" and the Sydney Festival. In a promotional interview for the Australian shows, Powers spoke in regard to his new band:

I think the Pink Monkey Birds conjures up all the best aspects of primal rock'n'roll ... Lyrically, I'm speaking in images, and from a very skewed viewpoint, whatever the subject may be. I still have the passion and the incentive to make music that's different, but still within the confines of a punk rock language people will know and understand.

The Pink Monkey Birds, whose name Kid credits to inspiration from David Bowie, has been an evolving unit since their earliest albums, and as of 2016 the touring members are bassist Kiki Solis, drummer Ron Miller, and guitarist Mark Cisneros (Des Demonas, Hammered Hulls, Make Up).

Kid Congo Powers was profiled by Vogue in late April 2016 while promoting his band's fourth album. In the interview, he was noted for his iconic sense of punk style and he mentions the aesthetic importance of tying the look of the band to match the music.

For me, the whole art of being a band—and I do think it's an art—is to create a whole world, a whole language, that is every aspect. The Gun Club, we kind of made it up as we went along, but what I learned from The Cramps and Nick Cave & the Bad Seeds is that they created a whole uncompromising world, and it's all kind of sprung out of that. You want to communicate with people, and I think through all aesthetics—artwork, the look, and music—you get to keep your world, and you get to let people enter your world and live in your world with you.

== Personal life ==
Kid Congo Powers is gay and is married. During the 1980s, he was involved with the ACT UP advocacy group.

== Selected discography ==
- 1981 The Cramps – Psychedelic Jungle
- 1983 The Cramps – Smell of Female
- 1984 The Gun Club – The Las Vegas Story
- 1987 The Gun Club – Mother Juno
- 1990 The Gun Club – Pastoral Hide and Seek
- 1991 The Gun Club – Divinity EP
- 1985 The Fur Bible EP
- 1988 Nick Cave and the Bad Seeds – Tender Prey
- 1990 Nick Cave and the Bad Seeds – The Good Son
- 1988 Barry Adamson – Moss Side Story
- 1994 Congo Norvell – Music to Remember Him By
- 1998 Mark Eitzel – Caught in a Trap and I Can't Back Out 'Cause I Love You Too Much, Baby
- 2004 Kid & Khan – Broken English
- 2005 Kid Congo Powers – Solo Cholo
- 2006 Kid Congo and the Pink Monkey Birds – Philosophy and Underwear
- 2006 Madrugada – Live at Oslo Spektrum [DVD]
- 2009 Kid Congo and The Pink Monkey Birds – Dracula Boots
- 2011 Kid Congo and The Pink Monkey Birds – Gorilla Rose
- 2013 Kid Congo and The Pink Monkey Birds – Haunted Head
- 2016 Kid Congo and The Pink Monkey Birds – La Araña Es La Vida
- 2021 Kid Congo and The Pink Monkey Birds – Swing from the Sean DeLear
- 2024 Kid Congo Powers and the Near Death Experience – Live in St. Kilda

== Selected filmography ==
- 1987 Wings of Desire
- 1999 Modern Young Man (film short)
- 2000 Once and Future Queen
- 2000 Hair Burners
- 2017 Scumbag
- 2022 The Resort (TV Series)
