= Jim Duckworth (musician) =

American musician

James Duckworth (born January 14, 1957) is an American blues guitarist. He was a member of Memphis group Tav Falco's Panther Burns alongside Alex Chilton in the early 1980s. He played on Charlie Pickett's 1986 album, Route 33, and was a member of the Los Angeles punkabilly blues band The Gun Club joining in January 1983. He formed the Wallendas in 2006 and is currently the lead guitarist for Buffalo Jack & The Parlor Snakes. In between bands, Duckworth did a lot of session work.
