= Jeffrey Lee Pierce =

American rock musician (1958–1996)

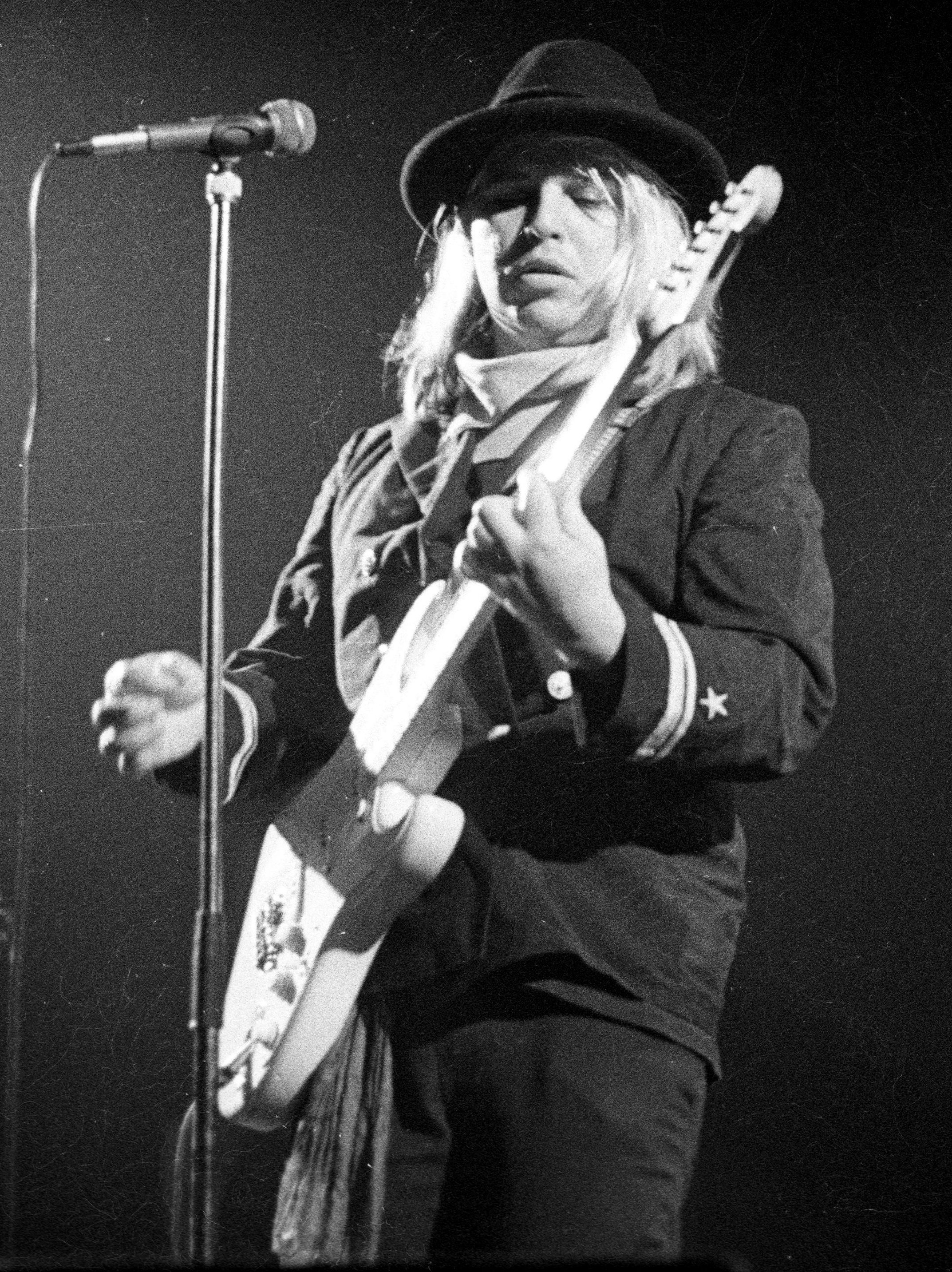
- Pierce performing with the Gun Club in 1985

Background information
- Born: June 27, 1958; Montebello, California, U.S.
- Origin: Los Angeles, California, U.S.
- Died: March 31, 1996 (aged 37) Salt Lake City, Utah, U.S.
- Instrument: Guitar
- Years active: 1977–1996
- Formerly of: The Gun Club

Jeffrey Lee Pierce (June 27, 1958 – March 31, 1996) was an American singer, songwriter, guitarist, and author. He was one of the founding members of the post-punk band the Gun Club, and released material as a solo artist.

== Early life ==
Pierce was born on June 27, 1958, in Montebello, California. He was the child of a multi-ethnic marriage. His Anglo father worked as a union organizer. His Mexican mother was a homemaker, taking care of Pierce and his sister, Jacqui. He started learning guitar at the age of 10. As a teenager, he moved from El Monte, a working-class industrial suburb east of Los Angeles, to Granada Hills, at the time a white working- and middle-class suburb in the San Fernando Valley. Pierce attended Granada Hills High School, where he participated in the drama program, acting in plays and writing several short experimental theater pieces.

== 1970s ==
Pierce's early musical interests were glam and progressive rock, including bands such as Sparks, Genesis, and Roxy Music. During the mid-1970s, after attending a concert by Bob Marley, Pierce became a fan of reggae, and subsequently traveled to Jamaica, where he met Winston Rodney and others, but also "got beat up there too", as he later recalled in an interview.

Pierce was also an admirer of Debbie Harry of Blondie, and became president of the band's West Coast fan club. He eventually became friends with Harry and Chris Stein. Blondie recorded the song "Hanging on the Telephone" in 1978 after Pierce gave Harry a cassette tape of the original 1976 version by obscure California band the Nerves.

His interest in reggae overlapped with the emergence of punk rock and he became involved in the Hollywood scene as a contributor to Slash magazine, writing on contemporary punk, 1930s blues, 1950s rockabilly, and on reggae under the name "Ranking Jeffrey Lea", including an interview with Bob Marley. By the late 1970s, Pierce was also performing as a musician.

Around this time Pierce met Los Angeles musician Phast Phreddie Patterson, who introduced Pierce to American roots music. Pierce was also a keen supporter of the no wave movement in New York City. Becoming disillusioned by the evolution of punk rock into what he saw as strict formality, and feeling that reggae was an import, Pierce developed a keen interest in and extensive knowledge of the Delta blues, taking influence and inspiration from his own culture's history.

Pierce encouraged his friend Brian Tristan, aka Kid Congo Powers, to play the guitar and develop his style, eventually recruiting him to form the band Creeping Ritual, which evolved into the Gun Club with the addition of drummer Terry Graham and bassist Rob Ritter.

== 1980s ==
The Gun Club's debut album, Fire of Love (1981), featured the songs "Sex Beat" and "She's Like Heroin to Me". The album also contains a version of Robert Johnson's "Preachin' Blues" and the love song "Promise Me". Australian musician Spencer P. Jones (a sometime collaborator with Pierce) suggested later (2014) that the blues influence in Pierce's music was largely the result of his access to the record collection of Canned Heat frontman Bob Hite, who allowed Pierce to come to his house and choose ten albums from Hite's vast blues record collection as he was dying.

The follow-up album, Miami (1982), was produced by Stein, and features renditions of "Devil in the Woods," "Sleeping in Blood City" and Creedence Clearwater Revival's "Run Through the Jungle." Pierce stated that he preferred Miami, and dismissed Fire of Love: "I can't even remember making it. What can you say about a record that you cut for 2500 bucks in 48 hours, on speed? It was just punk rock."

In September 1983, as the Gun Club prepared for an Australian tour, two band members quit due to financial concerns and ongoing frustration with Pierce's behavior. Nevertheless, Pierce and bass player Patricia Morrison traveled to Australia, where they enlisted two members of support act the Johnnys – Spencer Jones and Billy Pommer Jr – to fill in, as well as Kid Congo Powers, whom Pierce convinced to fly from the US to join them. Jones described the Gun Club's music as "way more brutal and full-on than any metal band I have ever heard."

The Las Vegas Story (1984) was the band's third album, seeing the return of Kid Congo Powers, drummer Terry Graham and a new bassist, Patricia Morrison. Dave Alvin also played lead guitar on two tracks. The album featured tribal beats ("Walking with the Beast") and slide-guitars ("Eternally is Here"), and other tracks included "My Dreams", "Bad America" and a cover of "My Man's Gone Now". The cassette tape version of the album also featured an extra track, "Secret Fires", missing from the vinyl L.P. but later available on the C.D. The album is dedicated to Debbie Harry, "for her love, help, and encouragement".

In December 1984, the Gun Club played two gigs in London, but by January 1985 had broken up, cancelling an upcoming Australian Tour. Morrison and Powers remained in London, forming Fur Bible, while Pierce visited Egypt with guitarist and new girlfriend Romi Mori, who he had met at a London show. Pierce relocated to England with Mori and concentrated on his solo career. He played a London gig on January 17, 1985, as 'Astro-Unicorn Experimental Jazz Ensemble', before recruiting Murray Mitchell, John McKenzie and Andy Anderson to record tracks which became the album Wildweed, the first on which Pierce played the majority of guitar parts, and material released later in the year as the "Flamingo" E.P. A different line-up including Romi Mori, Dean Dennis and Nick Sanderson also recorded with Pierce, completing the six-track "Flamingo" The EP featured a remix of Wildweed's opening track "Love and Desperation" and two cover tracks.

Wildweed's monochrome cover shot, of Pierce stood in a windswept barren landscape with a shotgun over his shoulder, was photographed on the south coast of England, as Pierce told a Swedish interviewer, but intended to "look like Texas. Or Kansas." Pierce toured Europe as The Jeffrey Lee Pierce Quartet, and from August 1985 he toured the United States and Canada. Pierce returned to Europe to play more shows, culminating in the Quartet's final gig on December 27 in London.

After six months in Japan, Pierce and Mori returned to London in August 1986, with Pierce intending to reform the Gun Club. Powers was by now living in Berlin and performing as guitarist with Nick Cave and the Bad Seeds, but accepted Pierce's offer and managed to combine working in both bands. With Mori now on bass, the band recorded 1987's Mother Juno, produced by the Cocteau Twins' Robin Guthrie, and featuring songs such as "Thunderhead", "Araby" and "The Breaking Hands".

== 1990s ==
Pierce's autobiography, Go Tell The Mountain, goes into detail about the personal turmoil he experienced during the late 1980s and early 1990s. His health had been poor for some time, having struggled with alcoholism and drug addiction. The final Gun Club album, 1993's Lucky Jim, includes the song "Idiot Waltz". Another album from that period is Ramblin' Jeffrey Lee and Cypress Grove with Willie Love, which consists mainly of cover versions of blues artists such as Howlin' Wolf, Lightnin' Hopkins, and Skip James.

In late 1993, Pierce spent time with Nick Cave and the Bad Seeds during the recording of their album Let Love In. Mick Harvey, a former Bad Seeds member, recalled, "He was sat on the couch during much of the recording ... He'd come almost every day and just sit on the couch and then he'd come out to dinner with us and just mumble away. He was very hard work. He was very unusual and a very unique guy." In May 1994, Pierce joined the band on-stage during the "Let Love In" European tour, culminating in a show at Shepherd's Bush Empire in London, where he sang a cover of the Johnny Cash/Bob Dylan song "Wanted Man". His last TV appearance was with the Bad Seeds on Later... with Jools Holland, recorded on May 14, 1994.

In November 1994, Pierce was arrested for brandishing a Samurai sword in his local pub in Kensington after an argument. He was due in court early in 1995, but flew instead to Japan, where he did some radio work and joined a Japanese band onstage, until he was hospitalized after a mugging. Pierce flew back to London in February to collect his belongings then returned to the United States, having been requested to leave England following his arrest and lack of visa. He returned to Los Angeles in 1995. Pierce continued working despite failing health, and reformed a Gun Club lineup for two shows in Los Angeles in August and September 1995, including guitarists Powers and Mike Martt, formerly of Tex & the Horseheads, and the Wayne Kramer rhythm section of bassist Randy Bradbury and drummer Brock Avery. The Gun Club's last ever gig, with bassist Elizabeth Montague replacing Bradbury, was at The Palace in Hollywood on December 18, 1995.

== Personal life ==
=== Relationships ===
Pierce had a relationship with singer Texacala Jones, and together they formed the band Tex and the Horseheads, with Pierce providing arrangements of traditional songs and playing the guitar in some of their initial performances. Guitarist, bass player and photographer Romi Mori was Pierce's longest romantic partner and a member of the second incarnation of The Gun Club. Pierce was also known for his strong admiration for Debbie Harry of Blondie, and was president of the Blondie fan club. Harry contributed backing vocals on the album Miami under the pseudonym D.H. Lawrence, and was a longtime mentor and supporter of Pierce. Texacala Jones noted that Pierce carried a handwritten note from Harry in his wallet with instructions on how she dyed her hair, including the types of products she used. According to Jones, the note was "written out in beautiful handwriting and 'with love, Debbie' at the bottom" and was Pierce's "most prized possession".

=== Character ===
In March 2012, Nick Cave gave an interview to Gun Club biographer Gene Temesy, researching for a book on the history of the Gun Club, which was published on the Australian web-based magazine Mess and Noise, noting Pierce's obsessions with the Vietnam War, dinosaurs, and Japanese horror movies. He went on: "with Jeffrey, you pretty much entered his world when you saw him. His obsessions crawled all over him. But in Jeffrey's world, sometimes it was very inspiring and illuminating and other times it was painful and depressing. But Jeffrey did make efforts to stay on top of all that sort of stuff. But I think it was very difficult for him ... Jeffrey very often didn’t make sense. That was part of his charm. Jeffrey was full of digressions. I think that was very much part of his character. Jeffrey digressed a lot. One minute he'd be talking about the fall of Saigon and the next minute he’d be talking about the size of a dinosaur's brain."

=== Death ===
Pierce contacted Powers in early 1996 to work together on a new iteration of the Gun Club, and they began making plans, with Powers looking to recruit musicians in New York. However, on March 25, 1996, Pierce was found unconscious at his father's home in Salt Lake City, Utah. He remained in a coma until his death from a cerebral hemorrhage on March 31 at the University of Utah Hospital.

== Legacy ==
=== Posthumous tributes ===
The French rock band Noir Désir paid tribute to Pierce in the song "Song for JLP", from its 1996 album 666667 Club. Blondie paid tribute to Pierce in its song "Under the Gun", from the 1999 album No Exit.

Pierce is honored by Thåström in a 2005 song recording. The World/Inferno Friendship Society also paid tribute to Pierce in their song by the same title.

Mark Lanegan recorded a cover version of the Gun Club's "Carry Home", from the album Miami, on his album I'll Take Care of You. Pierce and Lanegan cowrote the song "Kimiko's Dream House" that appears on Lanegan's album Field Songs.

In 2010, OFF!, a punk "supergroup" fronted by Keith Morris, formerly of Black Flag and the Circle Jerks, released a song dedicated to and named after Pierce. Morris, a friend and former housemate of Pierce, had suggested "The Gun Club" as a band name while they were living together. He described Pierce in 2010 as "not only one of my heroes, he's totally inspirational to me." At live performances, Morris has introduced "Jeffrey Lee Pierce" with a tribute to Pierce and their close friendship, describing the song as a "eulogy".

Pierce is mentioned in the Gallows song, "Everybody Loves You (When You're Dead)", from their 2012 self-titled album. The song ends with the lines:

Come back, Dee Dee Ramone. Come back, Jeffrey Lee Pierce. Come back, Frankie Venom. Come back, Lux Interior. Come back, Darby Crash. Come back, Johnny Thunders. Come back, Sid Vicious. Come back, Joe Strummer. We need you now.

Henry Rollins, another friend of Pierce, played the Gun Club song "Bill Bailey" during his first show for the "Artist in Residence" feature on Australian national radio station Double J. Rollins stated before playing the song: "Jeffrey Lee Pierce was a very good friend of mine and I miss him horribly. I play a lot of his music because I miss him and I want people to never forget the Gun Club."

Primal Scream's 2013 album More Light referenced Pierce and the Gun Club with a reworking of Pierce's "Goodbye Johnny" and use of the title "Walking with the Beast".

In 2014, Sergio Rotman of the Argentinian band Los Fabulosos Cadillacs edited a special edition of 500 CDs with versions of 14 Gun Club and Pierce songs. His 2002 tribute "El Fuego Del Amor" had previously featured eight Gun Club songs.

Dax Riggs, former front man of Acid Bath, Agents of Oblivion, and Deadboy & The Elephantmen, frequently performs a cover of the Gun Club's "Mother of Earth" at his live shows, always crediting Pierce and expressing admiration for his song-writing.

=== Jeffrey Lee Pierce Sessions Project ===
The Jeffrey Lee Pierce Sessions Project is a tribute initiative launched after Cypress Grove, one of Pierce's musical collaborators, cleaned out his loft following Pierce's death. Grove uncovered a recording of three songs on a cassette marked "JLP Songs", and realized they were from sessions he had worked on with Pierce for an album they were planning. The album was originally slated as a country-influenced album but eventually transformed into a blues recording. The sessions were recorded with acoustic guitars in Grove's bedroom using a "boombox" device. The three songs were "Ramblin' Mind", "Constant Waiting", and "Free To Walk", with further material uncovered over time to support the tribute project.

Grove contacted other artists via Myspace to contribute to the project, including Lanegan, and as the project grew, artists such as Isobel Campbell and Jim Sclavunos also agreed to contribute. The found recordings were too rough to release, and Glitterhouse Records, the label responsible for the project, used digital technology to allow artists to record their contributions from around the world. Other family and friends of Pierce provided additional material; Phast Phreddie Patterson submitted a copy of a homemade cassette recording of Pierce performing "My Cadillac" and "St. Mark's Place", which were pre-Gun Club recordings, and Cypress Grove obtained the two-inch master tapes of some song ideas they had recorded at the end of the Ramblin' Jeffrey Lee sessions.

In 2010, The Jeffrey Lee Pierce Sessions Project launched We Are Only Riders, the first of a series of four albums featuring Pierce's previously unreleased "works-in-progress". The album features interpretations of Pierce's work by friends and collaborators including Debbie Harry, Nick Cave, Lydia Lunch, Mick Harvey and Kid Congo Powers. In some cases, the contributing artists had to finish the songs themselves, with Pierce appearing posthumously on the recording via the inclusion of his original parts.

The Journey is Long, the second album from the project, was released in April 2012 and features The Jim Jones Revue, Barry Adamson, Warren Ellis of The Dirty Three, Steve Wynn of Dream Syndicate, as well as artists from the first album. Cave and Harry perform a duet of the song "The Breaking Hands", a song that is also performed by Lanegan and Isobel Campbell on the album, while Tex Perkins and Lunch perform together on "In My Room".

The third album from the project is Axels & Sockets, released by Glitterhouse Records on May 2, 2014, with contributors including Iggy Pop, Cave, Harry, Lanegan, Race, Thurston Moore and Primal Scream. Axels & Sockets opens with a rendition of "Nobody's City", for which Iggy Pop, Nick Cave and Thurston Moore used an original Gun Club demo recording from the Berlin demo tapes from the Mother Juno album in 1987. They took the original guitar parts played by Pierce and Powers and built a new song, with drums by Bad Seeds drummer Jim Sclavunos and guitar and vocals from Pop, Cave, and Moore.

Although the project's third and final album, The Task Has Overwhelmed Us, was due for release in late 2012, the schedule was changed after the release of the second installment. Glitterhouse Records instead released Axels & Sockets. The label clarified that the third album has become the "penultimate" full-length release of the Project. The Task Has Overwhelmed Us was released by Glitterhouse Records on September 29, 2023, more than nine years later. Contributors include Dave Gahan, Suzie Stapleton, The Coathangers and again Cave and Harry (in duet), Ellis, Lanegan and Lunch.

=== Documentaries ===
Jeffrey's Blues was a documentary filmed in 1989, directed by Bram van Splunteren for VPRO's Onrust and re-edited with unseen footage in 2016. It features interviews with Pierce, acoustic performances and clips of the Gun Club.

Pierce's life is the subject of the documentary, Ghost on The Highway: A Portrait of Jeffrey Lee Pierce and The Gun Club, directed by Kurt Voss, and produced by Voss and editor/composer Andrew R. Powell. In the documentary, Voss interviews Pierce's former collaborators, Kid Congo Powers, Ward Dotson, Terry Graham, Jim Duckworth, and Dee Pop, in addition to his high school friend Steven Tash, former publisher of Pierce's work, Henry Rollins, and Lemmy, lead singer of Motörhead. The documentary received mostly positive critical reception, but was criticized for not including any of Pierce's music or interview footage with him.

Hardtimes Killing Floor Blues, filmed in 1992 and released in 2008, documents Pierce's time living in Knightsbridge, London.

== Solo albums ==
- 1985 – Wildweed
- 1985 – Flamingo (EP)
- 1992 – Ramblin' Jeffrey Lee & Cypress Grove
