= The Gun Club =

American rock band

- The Gun Club in 1983. From left to right: Terry Graham, Jeffrey Lee Pierce, Kid Congo Powers and Patricia Morrison.

Background information
- Also known as: The Cyclones, the Creeping Ritual
- Origin: Los Angeles, California, U.S.
- Genres: Post-punk; punk rock; psychobilly; alternative rock; punk blues; cowpunk
- Years active: 1979–1996
- Labels: Ruby; Slash; Animal; Red Rhino; Fire; New Rose; Triple X
- Past members: Jeffrey Lee Pierce; Kid Congo Powers; Don Snowden; Brad Dunning; Terry Graham; Rob Ritter; Anna Statman; Ward Dotson; Billy Persons; Annie Ungar; Patricia Morrison; Jim Duckworth; Dee Pop; Jimmy Joe Uliana; Desi Desperate; Romi Mori; Nick Sanderson; Simon Fish; Rainer Lingk; Robert Marche; Efe; Mike Martt; Randy Bradbury; Brock Avery; Elizabeth Montague; Ian Shelton

The Gun Club were an American rock band from Los Angeles that existed from 1979 to 1996, formed and led by singer-songwriter and guitarist Jeffrey Lee Pierce. They were notable as one of the first bands in the punk rock subculture to incorporate influences from blues, rockabilly, and country music. The Gun Club has been called a "tribal psychobilly blues" band, as well as initiators of punk blues and cowpunk

== History ==
=== Early days (1976–1980) ===
By 1976, Jeffrey Lee Pierce was playing early rock n' roll tunes like Elvis Presley's "Fever" in L.A. garage bands, and by 1977 "discovers and becomes obsessed with reggae artist Bob Marley". Pierce was also the former head of the Blondie fan club in Los Angeles and previously a member of the Red Lights, the E-Types, the Individuals, Phast Phreddie & Thee Precisions, and the Cyclones. Some of Pierce’s compositions from this period of his career were later recorded by Tav Falco's Panther Burns for "The Journey Is Long : the Jeffrey Lee Pierce Sessions Project” album.

The Gun Club's precursor band, the Creeping Ritual, formed in late 1979. Along with Pierce (lead vocals and guitar), the first lineup consisted of Brian Tristan AKA Kid Congo Powers (lead guitar), Don Snowden (bass), who was at the time a music critic for the Los Angeles Times and Brad Dunning (drums), now a prominent designer and writer. In April 1980, they changed their name to "The Gun Club" on a suggestion by singer Keith Morris, then Pierce's roommate and also singer for Circle Jerks.

In his autobiography, Kid Congo Powers reflects on meeting Pierce for the first time, at a Pere Ubu show : "One balmy evening at the beginning of August 1979, I was standing in line outside the Whisky a Go Go to get into a Pere Ubu show...I spotted somebody moving toward me out of the corner of my eye. I looked up slowly, not really wanting to engage with anyone at all, and saw this truly eccentric-looking individual standing directly in front of me… “Hi, I’m Jeff,” he said... I’d seen him before, browsing through the racks of reggae imports at Bomp!, the record store…he said, “You should be in a band with me.”... We went into the club. Pere Ubu blew our minds to smithereens. My brain was whirling with all the possibilities open to me, having taken the decision to form a band with my new friend... the way it had been proposed, so matter-of-factly, and Jeffrey’s confidence in me, even though we were total strangers, made it seem entirely possible."("Some New Kind of Kick: A Memoir", Kid Congo Powers; 2022).

Kid Congo commented on the "influences (of) freeform jazz, literature, Lowry, Burroughs. We (were) intellectual, narcissistic," and that the early Gun Club incarnation were "too arty for rock people, far too rock for arty people, too cuckoo for the blues crowd and too American for punk".

Further commenting on the early days of the band, Congo Powers stated that it was his “first dealings with improvisation…(b)ecause it always was improvised songs with The Gun Club from the early days until the last days. We didn’t know when the parts (of the songs) were going to come or how long Jeffery (sic) might draw it out or if we were going to freak out or if we were going to stay cool. That was a huge turning point in sound and showed us what we could do. It shocked and surprised us…We were super irreverent, super nihilistic…We were out to destroy music as much as we were out to create it".

In July 1980 The Gun Club play Club 88 in central Los Angeles, a gig which is memorialised in Brendan Mullen’s book, "We Got the Neutron Bomb", when he describes “Jeffrey dressed in a black suit with a white shirt and a black string tie and a black hat, looking like something out of a Flannery O'Connor short story”, while Gun Club drummer Terry Graham, in his book “Punk Like Me,” reminisces, "(w)e land our first show…at Club 88 ( which ) earned us a lifetime ban…One thing is for sure: Gun Club doesn't sound like any other band in town…Our show at Club 88 confirms our status as the only blues band that plays punk and the only punk band that plays blues."

Their early concerts were remembered as wild affairs, with Screamin' Sirens chanteuse Pleasant Gehman writing in her column,On The Streets from LA Weekly in 1981 that "The Gun Club opened and literally tore the place apart. Jeff pulled down pieces of the decorations as he slammed around, muttering…"(p)eace and eternal love — just don't try to steal my drink…"

Snowden and Dunning departed in June 1980, replaced by two ex-members of the Bags, Rob Ritter and Terry Graham, respectively. Ritter was temporarily replaced on bass by Anna Statman for two months in the fall of 1980. Kid Congo Powers then left, on amicable terms, to join the Cramps in November 1980 and was replaced by lead and slide guitarist Ward Dotson (ex-Der Stab) who had initially hoped to join the Cramps. During this period, the Gun Club often opened for X, the Bags, Circle Jerks and the Blasters.

=== Fire of Love and Miami (1981–1982) ===
Securing a record deal with Ruby Records, a division of Slash, notable as one of the first and most successful independent record labels in alternative music,the group released their debut album, Fire of Love, on August 31, 1981. The album was produced by Tito Larriva (of the Plugz) and Chris D. (frontman of the Flesh Eaters). Critic Stevo Olende wrote that the "album's lyrical imagery is plundered from voodoo, '50s EC Comics and the blues", while Thom Jurek of AllMusic noted that "nobody has heard music like this before or since...The songs become rock & roll ciphers, erasing themselves as soon as they speak, heading off into the whirlwind of a storm that is so big, so black, and so awful one cannot meditate on anything but its power." Fire of Love sold well and received strong reviews upon release. Billy Persons of the Weirdos temporarily replaced Ritter for several shows in late 1981. Writing in the fanzine Perfect Sound Forever Stevo Olende notes that “(a)round this time, Pierce started saying in interviews that he harboured a dream of working in the Smithsonian Institute's music department ( the Smithsonian Institution) researching early American recordings both blues and country. Jim Duckworth, who would later frequently stay at Pierce's home, talks of his (Pierce's) room as almost a blues shrine”.

In April 1982, the Gun Club signed to Blondie guitarist Chris Stein's Animal Records, a subsidiary of Chrysalis Records. The band temporarily relocated to New York City to record their follow-up album, 1982's Miami. This album featured not only Stein as producer, but Blondie's Debbie Harry singing backup vocals on several tracks. Reflecting on the compositions on the Miami album, Pierce commented, "(e)ven though we idolized an older style of music, none of us were good enough to play it! What we came up with is our own version. I find myself writing about the feeling of being lost."

Upon the release of Miami on September 20, 1982, the album received good reviews but has been criticized for Stein's thin production.

Ritter left in June 1982 to concentrate on his other band, 45 Grave, and changed his name to Rob Graves. Before leaving, Ritter taught the bass parts to his former Bags bandmate Patricia Morrison (also ex-Legal Weapon) and trained her as his replacement. For their West Coast shows in August 1982, Annie Ungar was added as a second guitarist.Due to increasingly frequent arguments, Pierce dismissed Graham and Dotson in December 1982.

=== The Las Vegas Story and first breakup (1983–1985) ===
In January 1983, Graham and Dotson were replaced by guitarist Jim Duckworth (formerly of Tav Falco's Panther Burns) and drummer Dee Pop (formerly of the New York band Bush Tetras). A spare recording session, originally booked for another band, led to the impromptu recording of the Death Party EP with bassist Jimmy Joe Uliana quickly filling in for Morrison and Linda "Texacala" Jones on backing vocals. Released April 13, 1983, by Animal, it was the only recording of the short-lived lineup featuring Duckworth and Pop. During this time Pierce refrained from playing guitar, focusing solely on singing. After eight months Graham returned, replacing Pop, and on the eve of the October 1983 Australian tour, both Duckworth and Graham quit, refusing to board the plane. Arriving minus half the band, Pierce recruited drummer Billy Pommer Jr. and guitarist Spencer P. Jones from support act the Johnnys to fill in on the tour, while former member Powers also flew over to play guitar. When they returned to the US in November, Graham resumed his place on drums.

Pierce returned to guitar playing during this lineup, and both he and Powers are credited with guitar on their third album, The Las Vegas Story (the Blasters' Dave Alvin also played lead guitar on a handful of tracks). Released on June 25, 1984, this album marked a significant change for the band; it represented a shift away from the punk rock of Fire of Love and Miami and a step towards a more polished alternative rock sound. After US gigs supporting Siouxsie and the Banshees, in September the band embarked on a European tour in support of the album, but after five weeks Graham again departed after a gig in Paris. The band carried on and he was replaced with former roadie Peter Kablean, known as Desi Desperate, despite having no rehearsal. The Gun Club broke up in January 1985, Pierce remaining in London with then-girlfriend Romi Mori, who he had met during the final December 10–11 shows at Dingwalls, London.

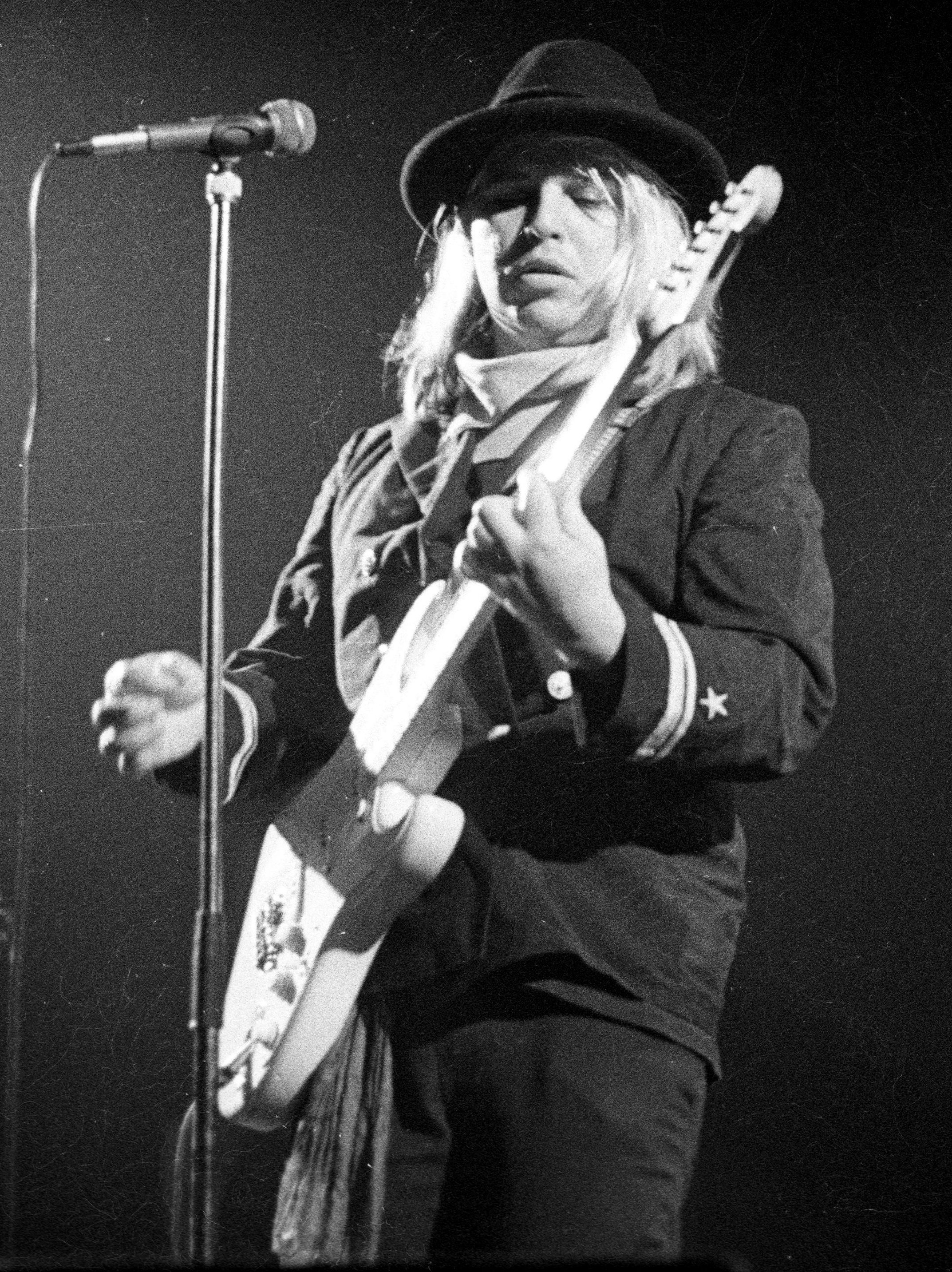
Jeffrey Lee Pierce performing with the band in 1985.

After the breakup, Powers, Morrison and Desperate formed a band called Fur Bible (Morrison later joined the Sisters of Mercy and the Damned), while Pierce embarked on a solo career. Pierce assembled a band, the Jeffrey Lee Pierce Quartet, consisting of former members of the Cure and Roxy Music, and released Wildweed in 1985. He organized a new band to tour in support of the album, including Mori on guitar and Nick Sanderson of Clock DVA on drums.

=== Reformation (1986–1994) ===
After a short stint doing spoken word performances, Pierce decided to reform a new version of the band in October 1986. Powers, who had also been recruited into Nick Cave and the Bad Seeds at this time, resumed his place at guitar, with Mori switching to bass and Sanderson retaining his spot on drums. This lineup of the Gun Club recorded a handful of albums, including Mother Juno, released October 19, 1987, on Red Rhino Records. This album, produced by Robin Guthrie of the Cocteau Twins, was a successful comeback, garnering a positive critical reception. After the release of Nick Cave's album The Good Son, Powers departed from the Bad Seeds in May 1990 to focus more on the Gun Club.

The band's fifth studio effort, Pastoral Hide and Seek, which Pierce produced himself, was released October 1, 1990, on the Fire label. Sanderson departed in December 1990 to focus on his other project, World of Twist. Desperate rejoined to record the Divinity album, released in August 1991 on New Rose Records, but the band were inactive during the remainder of that year as Pierce was hospitalized during his travels in India and Vietnam. Pierce also recorded with Cypress Grove.

Simon Fish, who had previously played with Pierce on one of his solo albums, joined the band in March 1992. At the conclusion of a European tour in May 1992, Powers left the band to focus on his other project, Congo Norvell. In February 1993, the band reconvened as a trio of Pierce, Mori and the returning Sanderson, to record the Lucky Jim album. For their spring 1993 European tour, they were joined by guitarist Rainer Lingk of Die Haut. Lucky Jim was released September 20, 1993, by Triple X Records, and Robert Marche (formerly of Subway Sect and JoBoxers) joined on guitar in October.

In May 1994, Mori and Pierce split up, and she and Sanderson left the Gun Club (Mori and Sanderson formed Freeheat in 1999 with Jim Reid and Ben Lurie of the Jesus and Mary Chain). Sanderson and Marche formed Earl Brutus. In the fall of 1994, Pierce put together a new lineup featuring Marche, bassist Efe and the returning Fish, lasting until November.

=== Final days (1995–1996) ===
An increasingly ill Pierce put together a penultimate Gun Club lineup for two shows in Los Angeles in August and September 1995, including guitarists Powers and Mike Martt (ex-Tex & the Horseheads), and the Wayne Kramer rhythm section of bassist Randy Bradbury and drummer Brock Avery. The final lineup of the Gun Club, with bassist Elizabeth Montague replacing Bradbury (who was touring with Pennywise), played only one show, the band's last, at The Palace in Hollywood on December 18, 1995.

On March 25, 1996, Pierce was found unconscious at his father's home in Salt Lake City, Utah. He was hospitalized and remained in a coma until his death from a brain hemorrhage on March 31, effectively ending the Gun Club.

== Musical style and influences ==
The Gun Club's music has been described as post-punk, punk rock, psychobilly, alternative rock, punk blues and cowpunk. They were influenced by punk rock and post-punk bands like Ramones, The Clash, Sex Pistols, The Damned, The Jam and Joy Division and blues musicians including Son House, Blind Willie McTell and Robert Johnson, garage rock bands such as the Kinks and the Sonics, the Detroit and England protopunk sound of bands like the MC5, Dr. Feelgood and the Stooges, in addition to groups like the Cramps, the Velvet Underground.

== Influence ==
The White Stripes played "For the Love of Ivy" and "Jack on Fire" (both from Fire of Love) at live shows. That band's vocalist and guitarist, Jack White, said, "'Sex Beat', 'She's Like Heroin to Me', and 'For the Love of Ivy'...why are these songs not taught in schools?"

Singer Mark Lanegan included Miami among his favorite recordings.

Canadian rock band Japandroids included "For The Love of Ivy" on their sophomore album Celebration Rock. Brian King (vocalist/guitarist) said "the magnitude of discovering The Gun Club cannot be understated."

== Band members ==
=== Former members ===
- Jeffrey Lee Pierce – vocals, guitar (1979–1996; his death)
- Kid Congo Powers – guitar (1979–1980, 1983–1996)
- Don Snowden – bass guitar
- Brad Dunning – drums (1979–1980)
- Terry Graham – drums
- Rob Ritter – bass guitar (1980–1982; died 1990)
- Anna Statman – bass guitar
- Ward Dotson – guitar (1980–1982)
- Billy Persons – drums
- Anny Unger – guitar
- Patricia Morrison – bass guitar (1982–1984)
- Jim Duckworth – guitar (1983)
- Dee Pop – drums (1983)
- Jimmy Joe Uliana – bass guitar (1983)
- Desi Desperate – drums
- Romi Mori – bass guitar (1987–1994)
- Derek Thompson – drums
- Nick Sanderson – drums (1987–1996; died 2008)
- Simon Fish – drums (1994)
- Rainer Lingk – guitar
- Robert Marche – guitar
- Efe – bass guitar (1994)
- Mike Martt – guitar; died 2023
- Randy Bradbury – bass guitar (1995)
- Brock Avery – drums (1995)
- Elizabeth Montague – bass guitar
- Nigel Preston – drums (1991; died 1992)

== Discography ==
=== Studio albums ===
- Fire of Love (1981, Ruby Records/Slash Records)
- Miami (1982, Animal Records)
- The Las Vegas Story (1984, Animal Records/Chrysalis Records)
- Mother Juno (1987, Red Rhino Records)
- Pastoral Hide and Seek (1990, Fire Records (UK), The Orchard Music (on behalf of Blixa Sounds); BMI – Broadcast Music Inc.)
- Divinity (1991, New Rose Records)
- Lucky Jim (1993, Triple X Records)

=== Singles and EPs ===
- "Ghost on the Highway"/"Sex Beat" 7-inch single (1982, Beggars Banquet Records)
- "Fire of Love" 7-inch single (1982, Animal Records)
- Death Party 12-inch EP (1983, Animal Records)
- Sex Beat 81 7-inch single (1986, Lolita)
- "Breaking Hands" 7-inch/12-inch single (1988, Red Rhino Records)
- "Sex Beat" CD single (1989, New Rose Records)
- "The Great Divide" 7-inch/12-inch single (1990, New Rose Records)
- "Pastoral, Hide & Seek (The Lost Song)" 7-inch/CD single (1991, New Rose Records)
- "Cry to Me" 7-inch single (1993, Sympathy for the Record Industry)
- "Walkin' With the Beast" 7-inch single (2004, Sympathy for the Record Industry)

=== Live albums ===
- The Birth the Death the Ghost (1983, ABC Records; recorded 1980)
- Sex Beat 81 (1984, Lolita; recorded 1981)
- Love Supreme (1985, Offense Records; recorded 1982)
- Danse Kalinda Boom – Live in Pandora's Box (1985, Megadisc; recorded 1984)
- Death Party (1987, Revenge Records; recorded 1981–1982)
- Ahmed's Wild Dream (1992, Solid Records; recorded 1992)
- Live in Europe (1993, Triple X Records; recorded 1992)
- Larger Than Live! (2008, Last Call Records; recorded 1990)
- Destroy the Country (2014, Cleopatra Records; recorded 1983)
- Moonlight Motel (2014, Cleopatra Records; recorded 1983–1984)

=== Compilation albums ===
- Two Sides of the Beast (1985, Dojo Records)
- In Exile (1992, Triple X Records)
- Early Warning (1997, Sympathy for the Record Industry)
- Pastoral Hide & Seek/Divinity (1997, 2.13.61 Records)
- Da Blood Done Signed My Name (2007, Castle Communications)
- The Life and Times of Jeffrey Lee Pierce and the Gun Club box set (2008, Retro Deluxe)
- Mother Berlin (2014, Bang! Records)
- In My Room (2017, Bang! Records)

=== Compilation appearances ===
- "Devil in the Woods" on Keats Rides a Harley (1981, Happy Squid Records)
- "Jack on Fire" on Rockabilly Psychosis and the Garage Disease (1984, Big Beat Records)
- "Sex Beat" on Slash: The Early Sessions (1984, Slash Records)

=== Live videos ===
- Live at the Hacienda VHS (1994, Visionary Communications/Jettisoundz; recorded 1983)
- Preaching the Blues VHS (1995, Visionary Communications/Jettisoundz; recorded 1984)
- Live at the Hacienda 1983/84 DVD (2006, Cherry Red Films; recorded 1983–1984)
- Fire of Love DVD (2007, Cherry Red Films; recorded 1983/1985)
