= XX – Two Decades of Love Metal =

Greatest hits album by HIM
- Released: 26 October 2012
- Length: 76:15
- Label: Sony; The End
- Producer: Various

HIM chronology
SWRMXS (2010)	XX – Two Decades of Love Metal (2012)	Tears on Tape (2013)

Professional ratings
Review scores
Source	Rating
About.com	3.5/5 stars
AllMusic	4/5 stars
examiner.com	4/5 stars

XX – Two Decades of Love Metal is a compilation album by Finnish rock band HIM, released 26 October 2012 in Europe and 6 November 2012 in the U.S. It features all of the band's singles spanning from 1997 to 2010, as well as a cover of the song "Strange World", originally by the artist Ké. It is the band's second singles compilation, the first being And Love Said No: The Greatest Hits 1997–2004, released in 2004.

== Track listing ==
All tracks are written by Ville Valo except where noted.

XX – Two Decades of Love Metal track listing
No.	Title	Original album	Length
1.	"Strange World" (Ké, M. Prendergast)	N/A	4:09
2.	"Join Me in Death"	Razorblade Romance	3:37
3.	"Heartkiller"	Screamworks: Love in Theory and Practice	3:29
4.	"Rip Out the Wings of a Butterfly"	Dark Light	3:30
5.	"The Kiss of Dawn" (radio edit)	Venus Doom	3:59
6.	"The Funeral of Hearts" (radio edit)	Love Metal	3:38
7.	"Right Here in My Arms" (radio edit)	Razorblade Romance	3:24
8.	"Pretending"	Deep Shadows and Brilliant Highlights	3:41
9.	"Buried Alive by Love" (radio edit)	Love Metal	4:00
10.	"Gone with the Sin"	Razorblade Romance	4:22
11.	"Your Sweet Six Six Six"	Greatest Love Songs Vol. 666	4:10
12.	"The Sacrament" (radio edit)	Love Metal	3:31
13.	"Wicked Game" (Chris Isaak)	Greatest Love Songs Vol. 666	3:53
14.	"Killing Loneliness"	Dark Light	4:29
15.	"Bleed Well" (radio edit)	Venus Doom	3:36
16.	"In Joy and Sorrow" (radio edit)	Deep Shadows and Brilliant Highlights	3:33
17.	"Poison Girl"	Razorblade Romance	3:51
18.	"Scared to Death"	Screamworks: Love in Theory and Practice	3:42
19.	"When Love and Death Embrace" (radio edit)	Greatest Love Songs Vol. 666	3:35
20.	"Heartache Every Moment"	Deep Shadows and Brilliant Highlights	3:57
Total length:			76:15

== Charts ==
Chart performance for XX – Two Decades of Love Metal
Chart (2012)	Peak position
Finnish Albums (Suomen virallinen lista)	4
German Albums (Offizielle Top 100)	98
