= Tears on Tape =

Studio album by HIM
- Released: 26 April 2013
- Recorded: September–November 2012
- Studio: Finnvox
- Genre: Gothic rock; hard rock
- Length: 40:56
- Label: DoubleCross (UK); Razor & Tie (US); Universal (EU)
- Producer: Hiili Hiilesmaa

HIM chronology
XX – Two Decades of Love Metal (2012)	Tears on Tape (2013)	Lashes to Ashes, Lust to Dust: A Vinyl Retrospective '96–'03 (2014)

Singles from Tears on Tape
- 1. "Into the Night" Released: 8 March 2013; 2. "Tears on Tape" Released: 4 April 2013; 3. "All Lips Go Blue" Released: 6 May 2013

Professional ratings
Review scores
Source	Rating
About.com	4/5 stars
AllMusic	2.5/5 stars
Alternative Press	4/5 stars
Artistdirect	5/5 stars
Classic Rock	8/10 stars
The Guardian	4/5 stars
Maximum Rock Magazine	10/10 stars
Metal Hammer	9/10
Revolver	3.5/5 stars
Stereoboard	4/5 stars

Tears on Tape is the eighth and final studio album by Finnish rock band HIM, released 26 April 2013 in Finland, 29 April 2013 in Europe, and on 30 April 2013 in the US and Canada. It is produced by Hiili Hiilesmaa, and was recorded at Finnvox, MD and Peacemakers, Helsinki. It is their first release containing instrumentals. A deluxe edition was released containing a DVD with a live in studio performance of some of their greatest hits.

== Background ==
At the beginning of 2011 HIM parted ways with Sire Records. In May the band began rehearsing songs for the full-length follow-up to 2010's Screamworks: Love in Theory and Practice. After a few months of rehearsals, the band's drummer, Mika Karppinen, began complaining of pain in his wrists. Medical examinations concluded that he had nerve damage in his hands and arms caused by repetitive stress. Karppinen was told by his doctors to stop drumming so that he would have time to heal. During this time the band's singer, Ville Valo, was said to have filled in on drums while working on new material. Subsequent treatments were successful and after about eight months the band was able to start rehearsing with Karppinen again.

Rehearsals began in northern summer of 2012 and in September the band entered Finnvox Studios in Helsinki, Finland to begin tracking for the new album with producer Hiili Hiilesmaa. This would be their fourth album recorded at the famed studio as well as their fourth with Hiilesmaa at the helm. During this time, live in-studio performances were recorded in both audio and video to be used as bonus tracks. This was the same session that produced the music video for their cover of the Ké song "Strange World", released on the compilation XX – Two Decades of Love Metal. In November 2012 Tim Palmer began mixing tracks in London and completed in early December.

Because the band had lacked a label the new album was paid for out of pocket, putting them in a unique position of owning all publishing rights to their music which allowed them to shop the album to various labels for distribution. In February 2013 it was announced that the new album would be licensed to three separate record companies, one for each market. Agreements were reached with Universal Records in Europe, Razor & Tie in the United States, and Cooking Vinyl's new rock imprint DoubleCross in the United Kingdom and Ireland. With this new strategy came the decision to release separate singles simultaneously to each market. The track "Into the Night" was chosen for the Finnish market, "All Lips Go Blue" for the UK and US, and "Tears on Tape" for the rest of Europe. Music videos were filmed for each single in late February to early March 2013.

Tears on Tape is the first and only HIM release to include instrumental interludes.

== Artwork and packaging ==
The album's artwork, created by Daniel P. Carter, consists of a snake, circling the heartagram which is encased in a heptagram, or more specifically the Seal of Babalon. There are markings on the snake's back, a code in Malachim which when decoded says, "Tears on tape, I will follow into your heart sketching rain from afar. Tears on tape, she surrenders needle in arm while we dance into the storm," the chorus lyrics from the album's title track.

The album has been offered in several special editions and bundles. On 15 February Metal Hammer Magazine announced that they would be offering a preorder fanpack that includes the full UK release album, two bonus tracks, a double-sided door poster, and a 132-page magazine edited by Ville Valo. The demand for this preorder was so high that the ordering website's server was overloaded and briefly orders could only be made by telephone. In the United States, MerchNow has offered several preorder bundles including various pieces of apparel, posters, CD/DVD combo, digital downloads, and four limited edition vinyl versions of the album in transparent green, transparent blue, clear, and cream.

== Commercial performance ==
On 8 May 2013, Razor & Tie announced that Tears on Tape had sold 20,200 copies in its first week in the United States alone, making it HIM's second-highest-charting album in the United States behind Venus Doom.

== Track listing ==
All tracks are written by Ville Valo.

Tears on Tape track listing
No.	Title	Length
1.	"Unleash the Red" (instrumental)	1:07
2.	"All Lips Go Blue"	3:49
3.	"Love Without Tears"	3:37
4.	"I Will Be the End of You"	3:33
5.	"Tears on Tape"	3:21
6.	"Into the Night"	3:36
7.	"Hearts at War"	3:46
8.	"Trapped in Autumn" (instrumental)	1:33
9.	"No Love"	3:30
10.	"Drawn & Quartered"	5:13
11.	"Lucifer's Chorale" (instrumental)	1:18
12.	"W.L.S.T.D."	4:12
13.	"Kiss the Void" (instrumental)	2:21
Total length:		40:56

Metal Hammer fanpack bonus tracks
No.	Title	Length
14.	"Buried Alive by Love" (live in studio)	4:48
15.	"The Kiss of Dawn" (live in studio)	4:33
16.	"Rip Out the Wings of a Butterfly" (live in studio)	3:25
17.	"The Funeral of Hearts" (live in studio)	4:47
18.	"Heartkiller" (live in studio)	3:39
19.	"Join Me in Death" (live in studio)	3:38
20.	"When Love and Death Embrace" (live in studio)	6:19

MerchNow pre-order
No.	Title	Length
14.	"When Love and Death Embrace" (live in studio)	6:19

Finnish CD/DVD limited edition
No.	Title	Length
14.	"Buried Alive by Love" (live in studio video)	4:49
15.	"The Kiss of Dawn" (live in studio video)	4:34
16.	"When Love and Death Embrace" (live in studio video)	6:20
17.	"Join Me" (live in studio video)	3:39
18.	"The Funeral of Hearts" (live in studio video)	4:55
19.	"Heartkiller" (live in studio video)	3:40
20.	"Wings of a Butterfly" (live in studio video)	3:32

iTunes pre-order
No.	Title	Length
14.	"Heartkiller" (live in studio video)	3:40
15.	"Wings of a Butterfly" (live in studio video)	3:32
16.	"Join Me" (live in studio video)	3:33
17.	"The Kiss of Dawn" (live in studio video)	4:32
18.	"The Funeral of Hearts" (live in studio video)	4:55

Limited edition CD/DVD
No.	Title	Length
14.	"Heartkiller" (live in studio video)	3:40
15.	"Wings of a Butterfly" (live in studio video)	3:32
16.	"Join Me" (live in studio video)	3:33
17.	"The Kiss of Dawn" (live in studio video)	4:32
18.	"The Funeral of Hearts" (live in studio video)	4:55

German limited edition CD/DVD
No.	Title	Length
14.	"Buried Alive by Love" (live in studio video)
15.	"Wings of a Butterfly" (live in studio video)
16.	"Heartkiller" (live in studio video)
17.	"Join Me" (live in studio video)
18.	"The Kiss of Dawn" (live in studio video)
19.	"The Funeral of Hearts" (live in studio video)
20.	"When Love and Death Embrace" (live in studio video)

== Personnel ==
- Ville Valo – lead vocals, acoustic guitar, drums and bass guitar on "Kiss the Void", piano on "Trapped in Autumn"
- Mikko Viljami "Linde" Lindström – lead guitar
- Mikko Henrik Julius "Migé" Paananen – bass guitar
- Janne Johannes "Emerson Burton" Puurtinen – keyboards, backing vocals
- Mika Kristian "Gas Lipstick" Karppinen – drums
- Produced and engineered by Hiili Hiilesmaa; recorded at Finnvox Studios, Helsinki
- Record engineering assisted by Jesse Valo and Sebastian Bisso
- Mixed by Tim Palmer at Assault & Battery Studios, London
- Mix assisted by John Catlin; additional mixing/recording at '62 Studios, Room 332 & T.O.S.
- Mastered by Ted Jensen at Sterling Sound, New York City
- Art by Daniel P. Carter
- Layout by Rami Mursula
- Music and lyrics by Ville Valo
- Published by Heartagram
- Licensed by Himsalabim Oy

== Charts ==
2013 chart performance for Tears on Tape
Chart (2013)	Peak position
Australian Albums Chart	65
Austrian Albums Chart	7
Finnish Albums Chart	2
German Albums Chart	2
Hungarian Albums Chart	32
Spanish Albums Chart	31
US Billboard 200	15
US Alternative Albums	3
US Hard Rock Albums	1
US Rock Albums	3

2024 chart performance for Tears on Tape
Chart (2024)	Peak position
Finnish Albums (Suomen virallinen lista)	12
Scottish Albums (OCC)	98
UK Independent Albums (OCC)	44
