= Michael Prendergast (songwriter) =

American songwriter and producer

Michael Prendergast is an American songwriter and producer. His songs have been recorded by such artists as Ké, Nina Z, Michael Popov, Tammy Infusino, Raúl Moreno, Richelle, Zhana, and many others.

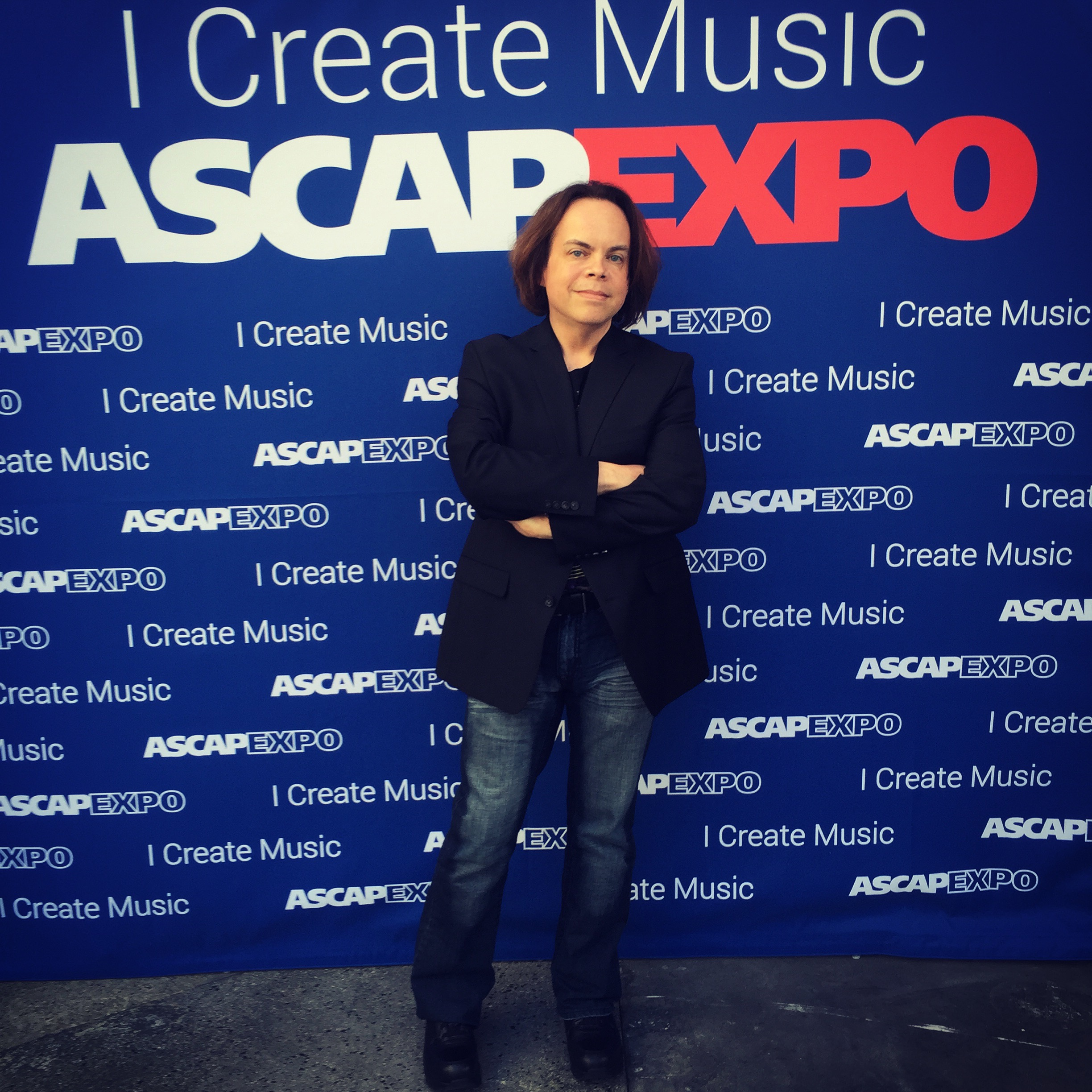
"ASCAP EXPO MAY 2015".

The majority of Michael Prendergast's songs are in the dance/pop and ballad genres, the most successful of which to date has been his collaboration with RCA Records' Ké. The single "Strange World," co-written by Michael, became a smash hit in Europe, topping the airplay charts in countries such as Italy France Spain Portugal and Germany. "Strange World" would eventually be used on the soundtracks of such television shows as Melrose Place and Party of Five and later became a #9 Billboard club hit with a remix by Junior Vasquez. The single sold approximately 3 million copies worldwide. In 2012, the Finnish multi-platinum group HIM released a cover of "Strange World" for their compilation album XX - Two Decades of Love Metal on Universal Records, and in 2016 the Italian group Matmata released a cover in Italian and English. Also, "Believer," which Michael co-wrote and co-produced with Ké, appeared on the compilation album "Earth Music" (Warner Brothers Records) by DJ Junior Vasquez.
