= HIM (Finnish band) =

Finnish rock band

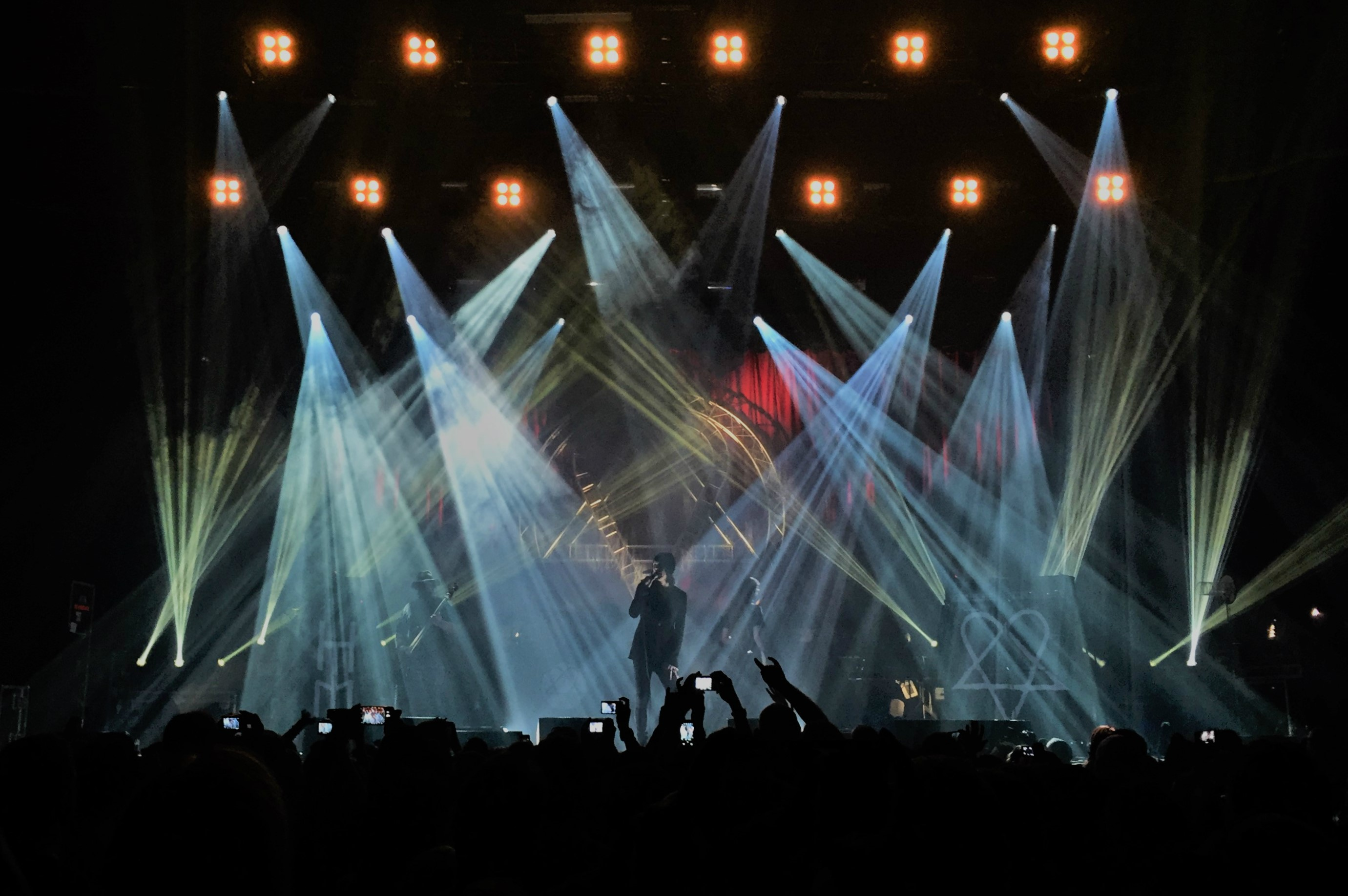
- HIM performing at the Helsinki Ice Hall in December 2017

Background information
- Also known as: His Infernal Majesty (1991–1993); H.I.M. (1995–2017); HER (2002, United States)
- Origin: Helsinki, Finland
- Genres: Gothic rock; gothic metal; alternative rock
- Years active: 1991–1993; 1995–2017
- Labels: BMG; Sire; Razor & Tie; Double Cross; Universal Music Group
- Spinoffs: Daniel Lioneye
- Past members: Ville Valo; Mikko "Mige" Paananen; Sami "Juippi" Jokilehto; Juha Tarvonen; Mikko "Linde" Lindström; Oskari "Oki" Kymäläinen; Antto Melasniemi; Juhana "Pätkä" Rantala; Mika "Gas Lipstick" Karppinen; Jussi-Mikko "Juska" Salminen; Janne "Burton" Puurtinen; Jukka "Kosmo" Kröger

HIM (sometimes stylized as H.I.M.) was a Finnish rock band formed as His Infernal Majesty in Helsinki in 1991 by vocalist Ville Valo and bassist Mikko "Mige" Paananen. The band broke up after a few years, then it was reformed in 1995 by Valo and guitarist Mikko "Linde" Lindström. After being rejoined by Mige, as well as keyboardist Antto Melasniemi and drummer Juhana "Pätkä" Rantala, the band, now called HIM, released its debut album Greatest Lovesongs Vol. 666 in 1997. In 2000, now with drummer Mika "Gas Lipstick" Karppinen and keyboardist Juska Salminen, the band released Razorblade Romance, which reached the number one spot in Finland, Austria and Germany. The first single "Join Me in Death" also charted at number one in Finland and Germany, eventually going Platinum and Gold, respectively. Following the addition of Janne "Burton" Puurtinen on keyboards, HIM released Deep Shadows and Brilliant Highlights (2001) and Love Metal (2003). Both cracked the top ten in several countries and allowed the band to tour in the United Kingdom and the United States for the first time.

In 2005, HIM released Dark Light, which became the group's most commercially successful album to date. HIM also became the first Finnish group to receive a Gold record in the US. In 2007, HIM released Venus Doom, the making of which was marred by problems in Valo's personal life. Nevertheless, the album gave the band its highest chart position in the US at number twelve. After 2010's Screamworks: Love in Theory and Practice, HIM went on a hiatus after Gas Lipstick was forced to take medical leave. Following several months of uncertainty, the band regrouped and released the album Tears on Tape in 2013. Gas Lipstick announced his departure from the band in 2015 and was subsequently replaced by Jukka "Kosmo" Kröger. On 5 March 2017, HIM announced that they would be disbanding following a farewell tour. The band played its final show on New Year's Eve 2017 as a part of its annual Helldone Festival.

HIM is one of the most commercially successful Finnish bands, with sales of over ten million records. HIM has also received numerous accolades, including eight Emma Awards. The band is known for its distinct sound, which combines more melodic and melancholic elements with heavier influences. This made it difficult for audiences to categorize HIM's music, which led to the band coining the term "love metal". HIM is also known for its logo, the heartagram, which has made numerous appearances in other media.

== History ==
=== 1991–1996: Early years ===
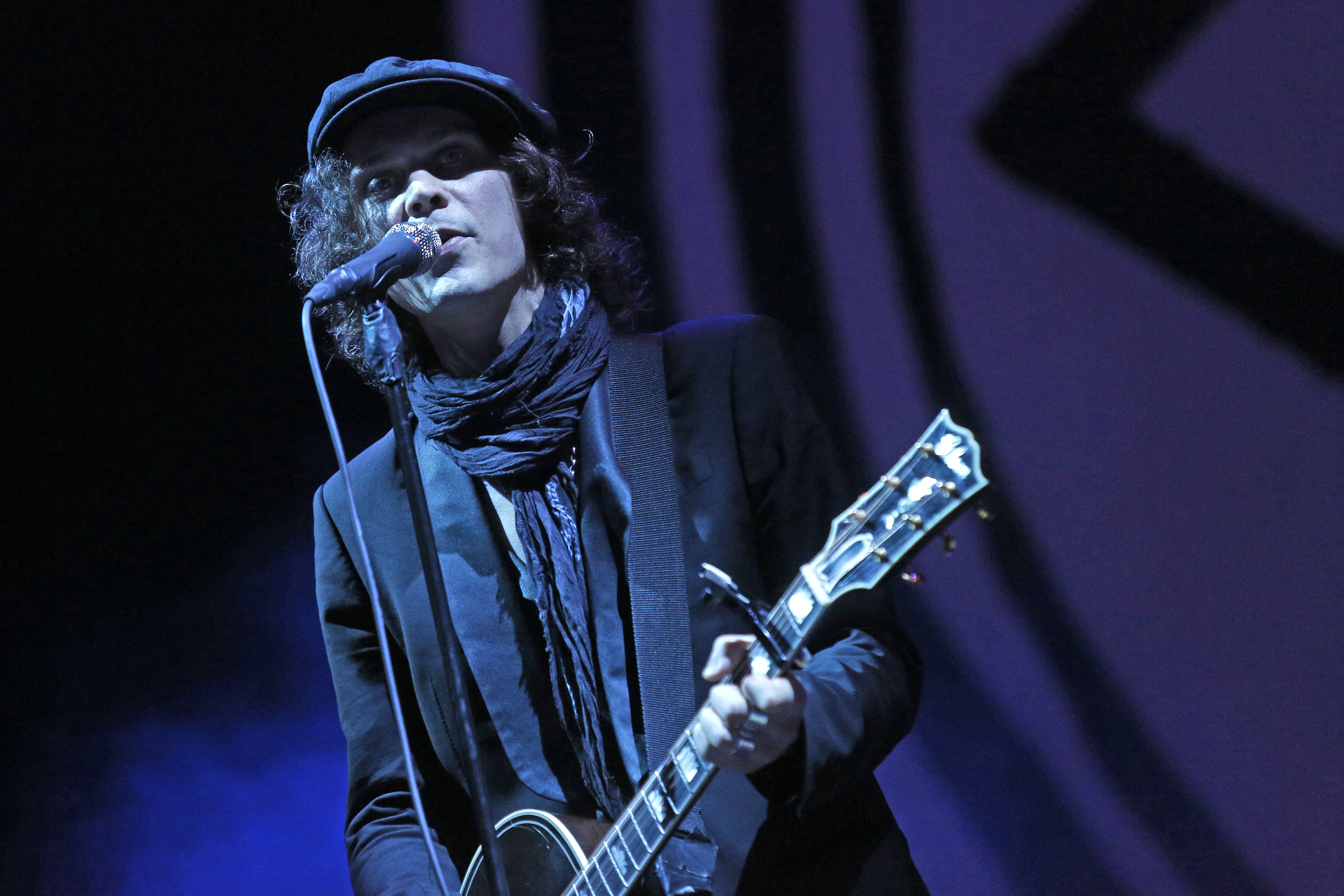
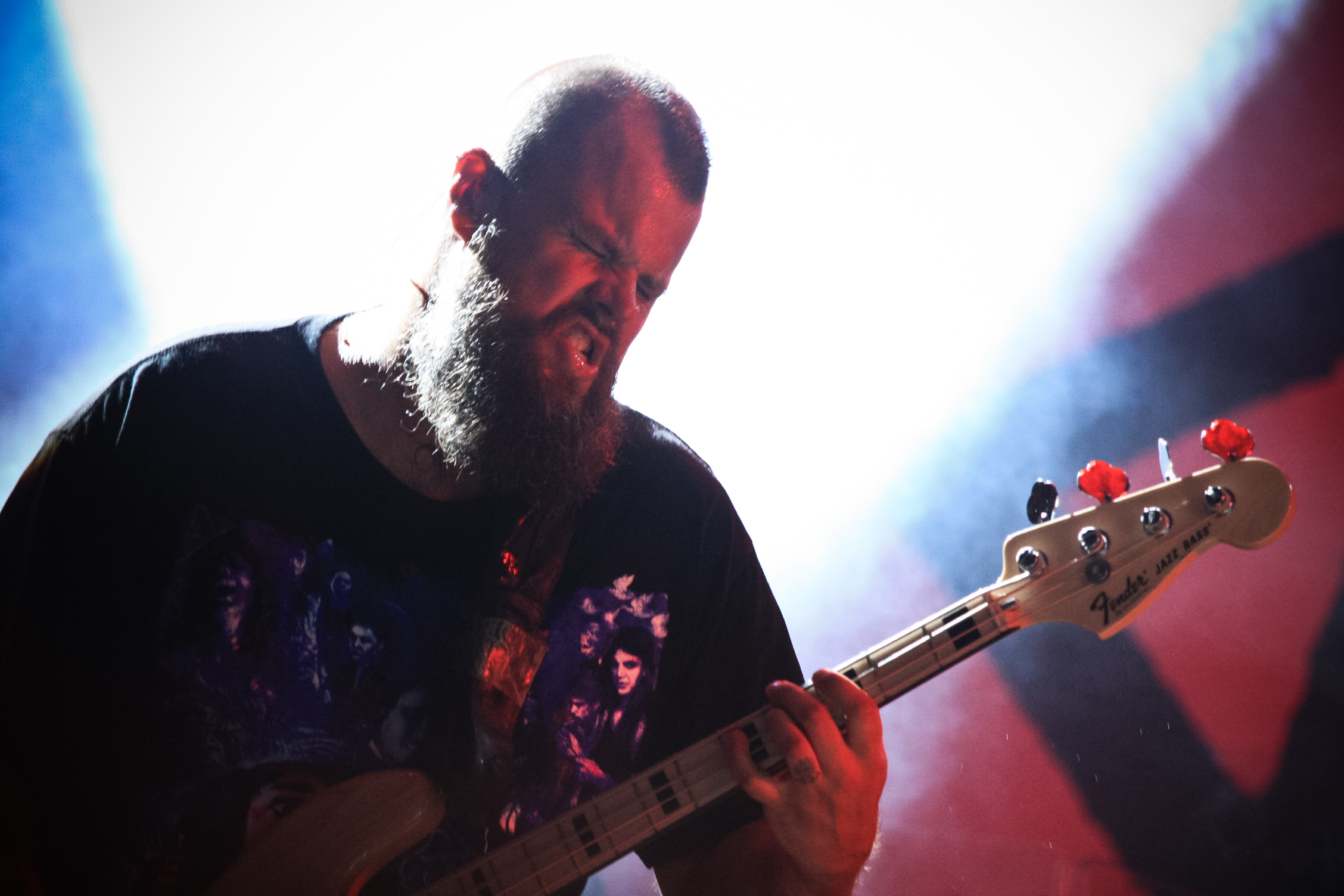
Ville Valo (left) and Mige (right) formed His Infernal Majesty in 1991 (pictured here in 2013)

The first incarnation of HIM was formed in 1991 by childhood friends Ville Valo and Mikko "Mige" Paananen in Helsinki, Finland. Valo played six-string bass, which substituted for guitar, while Mige also played bass. The band had two rotating drummers: Sami "Juippi" Jokilehto and Juha Tarvonen. Dubbed His Infernal Majesty, other names considered for the band included Black Earth, Black Salem and Kafferi. After recording its first demo Witches and Other Night Fears, His Infernal Majesty played its first show on New Year's Eve 1992 at the Semifinal in Helsinki. The band broke up shortly thereafter, when Mige began his national military service. In 1995, His Infernal Majesty was reformed by Valo and guitarist Mikko "Linde" Lindström. Together they recorded a four-track demo, which featured Valo on drums and vocals, and Linde on guitar and bass. Valo originally intended to remain as the bassist for the group, but took up the role of lead vocalist out of necessity, after they were unable to find another singer. Eventually the two were joined by returning bassist Mige and drummer Juhana "Pätkä" Rantala. The group played its first show on 19 December 1995 at the Teatro in Helsinki, opening for Kauko Röyhkä. The band's next show was also at the Teatro, this time performing Type O Negative covers, for which they recruited keyboardist Janne "Burton" Puurtinen.

His Infernal Majesty continued to record several more demos, sending them to Nuclear Blast, Roadrunner and Spinefarm Records, among others, all of whom passed on the band. Eventually they were signed to BMG by production manager Asko Kallonen, who was impressed by the band's cover of Chris Isaak's "Wicked Game". In October 1996, the band, now called HIM, released the EP 666 Ways to Love: Prologue. Recorded in only five days and produced by Hiili Hiilesmaa, the EP also featured Oskari "Oki" Kymäläinen on guitar, but he was fired from the group after allegedly having an affair with Pätkä's girlfriend. 666 Ways to Love: Prologue debuted at number sixteen on the Finnish Singles Chart and peaked at number nine five weeks later. The band played a special album release show at the Tavastia Club on 19 October 1996, before starting a full tour, for which they recruited keyboardist Antto Melasniemi.

=== 1997–2000: Greatest Lovesongs Vol. 666 and Razorblade Romance ===
HIM began recording its full-length debut album in 1997 with Hiili Hiilesmaa once again producing. Due to the band's minimal studio experience, Hiilesmaa played a critical role in helping "build HIM's sound", for which Valo dubbed him the honorary sixth member of the group. Greatest Lovesongs Vol. 666 was released in Finland on 3 November 1997 and internationally a year later. The album charted in Finland and Germany, peaking at number four in the former. The singles "When Love and Death Embrace" and "Your Sweet 666" also cracked the top ten in the band's home country. Greatest Lovesongs Vol. 666 received positive reviews from critics, with AllMusic describing the album as having "a very diverse sound" and ultimately succeeding "in pleasing everyone, whether they're into rock or pop." Greatest Lovesongs Vol. 666 would eventually go platinum in Finland. HIM also went on to win Newcomer of the Year and Debut Album of the Year at the 1997 Emma Gala. The supporting tour for Greatest Lovesongs Vol. 666 began in mid-December 1997 at the Maxim in Kuopio. Prior to HIM's first international tour, the band decided to fire keyboardist Antto Melasniemi, as they felt he was too disorganized and scatterbrained. He was replaced by Jussi-Mikko "Juska" Salminen. After returning to Finland, the band also parted ways with Pätkä. According to the band, Pätkä's girlfriend had become pregnant, which left him with limited time to rehearse. He was replaced by Mika "Gas Lipstick" Karppinen.

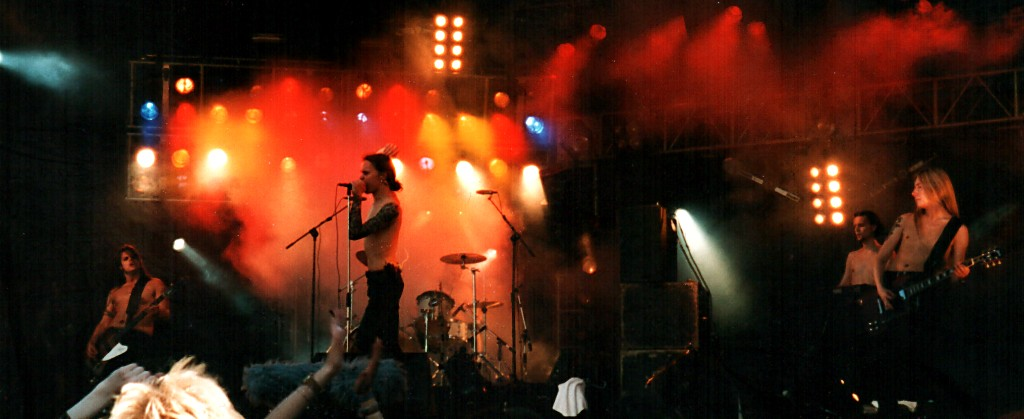
HIM performing at Provinssirock in June 1999

In January 1999, HIM began demoing material for its next album with Hiili Hiilesmaa. These sessions proved to be unsuccessful, however, and the band decided to relocate to Rockfield, Wales with producer John Fryer. In November 1999, HIM released the single "Join Me in Death", which charted at number one in Finland and Germany. The single would eventually go platinum in Finland, as well as gold in Germany and Austria. At the 1999 Emma Gala, HIM were named Export of the Year. On 31 December 1999, the band performed at the Tavastia Club in Helsinki, Finland, which turned into a New Year's tradition for the group. HIM's second album Razorblade Romance was released on 24 January 2000. It peaked at number one in Finland, Austria and Germany. The album would eventually be certified double platinum in Finland, triple gold in Germany, as well as gold in Austria. Four more singles were released, all of which reached the top five on the Finnish Singles Chart. Razorblade Romance was mostly well received by critics. Soundi gave the album four out of five stars, while Blabbermouth.net called it "yet another amazingly crafted album from Europe's best-kept secret." At the 2000 Emma Gala, HIM was named Band of the Year and Razorblade Romance Album of the Year. The group also received the Viewers' Choice Award and the Video of the Year award for "Join Me in Death" at the 2000 VIVA Comet Awards. During the supporting tour for Razorblade Romance, HIM played its first shows in the United Kingdom. As the tour progressed, however, the band began to feel exhausted. They were also hit with several near-fatal accidents, where Valo nearly fell off a balcony and Salminen ended up in the emergency room after a prank gone wrong. By the band's own account, HIM nearly broke up, though they eventually regrouped and began rehearsing for another album.

=== 2001–2004: Deep Shadows and Brilliant Highlights and Love Metal ===
In late 2000, HIM began demoing material for its third album with producer T. T. Oksala. Satisfied with the results, the band initially wanted to release these demos as its next album. However, BMG resisted and brought producer Kevin Shirley on board to work on the record. Around this time, keyboardist Juska Salminen was also fired from the group after missing several rehearsals. Salminen would later attribute his departure to burnout. He was replaced by Janne "Burton" Puurtinen. The recording process for HIM's third album lasted approximately eleven months, which greatly affected the material. Valo later explained: "When we started recording the third album, we were into stoner rock and Black Sabbath [...] At the end we were into Neil Young and it shows on the record." According to Valo, outside influences within the music industry also contributed to the extended recording process. HIM's third album Deep Shadows and Brilliant Highlights was eventually released on 24 August 2001. The record peaked at number one in Finland and Austria, and at number two in Germany and Switzerland. The album would eventually go platinum in Finland and gold in Austria. Three singles were released, all of which reached the top five in Finland. Deep Shadows and Brilliant Highlights received mixed reviews, with AllMusic calling it "way too clean" and "utterly boring". This was echoed by Soundi, who called the album "ideal music for girls, who don't dig the music, but Ville Valo's looks and his lyrics' decadent imagery." Blabbermouth.net, meanwhile, was more positive, stating that "in purely artistic and commercial terms [...] HIM have made the logical follow-up album to one of last year's highlights, and they continue to cement their reputation as one of the most unique and consistent rock acts around." HIM was once again named Export of the Year at the 2001 Emma Gala. The band also received the Viewers' Choice Award at the VIVA Comet Awards.

In 2002, HIM was involved in a rights dispute over its name in the United States. As "HIM" was already owned by the drummer of a Chicago jazz fusion band of the same name, the Finnish HIM was renamed HER in the US, until a settlement was reached between the two parties, which allowed both to use the moniker. On 7 October 2002, the band released The Single Collection, a set containing all the group's singles, along with a previously unreleased single of "It's All Tears". That same month, HIM's official biography Synnin viemää, written by J. K. Juntunen, was released. The supporting tour for Deep Shadows and Brilliant Highlights once again exhausted the band nearly to the point of breaking up, but it also brought the group closer together. HIM also played its first concert in the United States at a one-off show organized by professional skateboarder and television personality Bam Margera. He would go on to work with the band extensively, promoting them and directing several of their music videos.

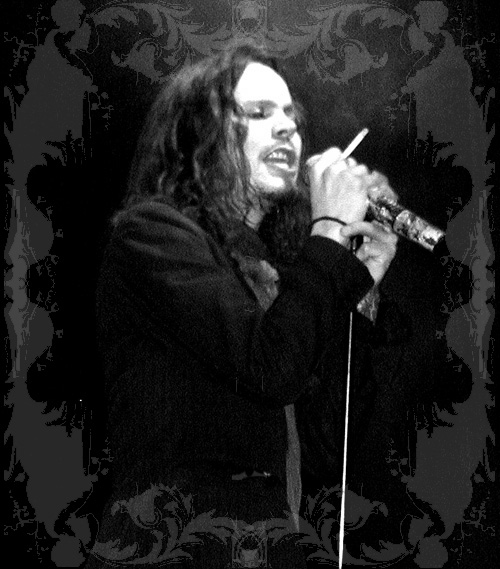
Ville Valo performing with HIM in Norfolk, Virginia, 2004

Following a two month break in early 2002, HIM regrouped and began rehearsing for its next album, which saw the band working with Hiili Hiilesmaa again. The band viewed the record as a reaction to the difficulties they faced during Deep Shadows and Brilliant Highlights. According to Valo: "After what we considered a disappointment with Deep Shadows and Brilliant Highlights, because there were so many chefs in the kitchen, we wanted to be a band [...] that we control what we do, and everybody else can fuck off." This new determination was underlined by the decision to include the band's logo, the heartagram, prominently on the front cover. Valo called this "a statement of intent [...] musically, visually and ideologically". HIM's fourth studio album Love Metal was released on 11 April 2003, and it reached the top five in four countries, peaking at number one in Finland and Germany. It also became the group's first album to chart in the UK at number 55. Love Metal would be certified platinum in Finland and gold in Germany. Three singles were released, with "The Funeral of Hearts" peaking at number one in Finland. The music video was later named Best Video at the 2004 Kerrang! Awards. Love Metal was well received by critics, with Soundi giving it three out of five stars, while AllMusic noted how "the songwriting is as strong as it has been in quite some time and a newly found sense of urgency keeps the record going at a well-tempered pace".

Following Love Metal's release, HIM embarked on its first US tour, which was entirely sold-out. In August 2003, HIM parted ways with BMG, having fulfilled its contractual obligations to the label. The band were also set on releasing a live album, tentatively titled Live Metal, in November 2003, but the record was ultimately scrapped in favor of new material. In March 2004, HIM released And Love Said No: The Greatest Hits 1997–2004, which peaked at number two in Finland and number five in Germany. It also went gold in the band's home country. Aside from previously released material, the collection also included two new songs, "And Love Said No" and a cover of Neil Diamond's "Solitary Man". The singles peaked at number one and two, respectively, in Finland, while "Solitary Man" reached number nine on the UK Singles Chart. In September 2004, HIM signed a new recording contract with Sire Records, who would handle all the band's future releases in Europe, North America, Japan and Australia. In Finland, HIM's future releases would be handled through the band's own label Heartagram. On 7 December 2004, HIM released The Video Collection: 1997–2003, a DVD featuring all the band's music videos. HIM was also voted 2004's Band of the Year by the readers of Metal Hammer magazine.

=== 2005–2008: Dark Light and Venus Doom ===
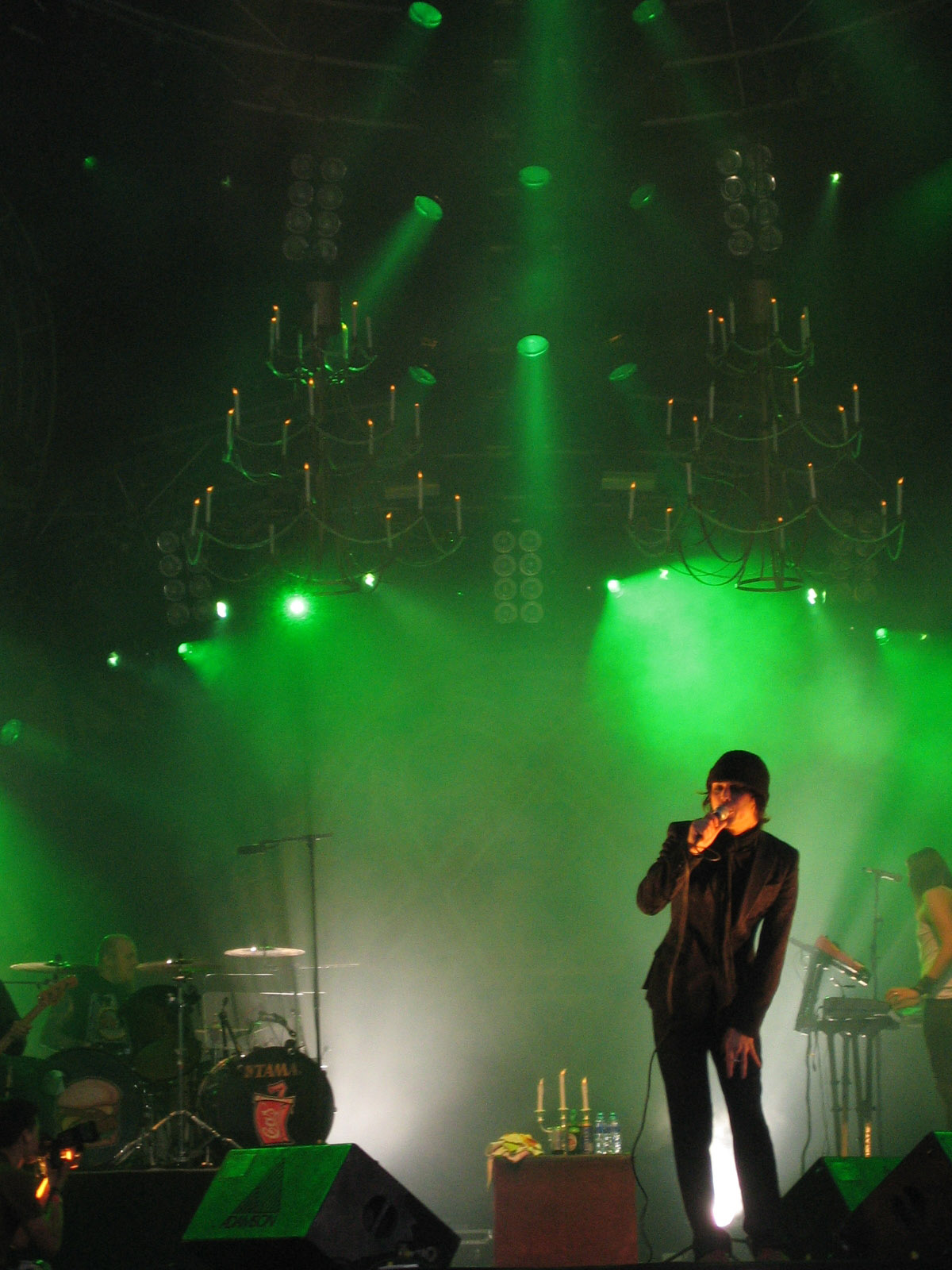
HIM performing at Provinssirock in June 2006

On 17 January 2005, HIM performed at the Yhteinen ASIA benefit concert for victims of the 2004 Indian Ocean earthquake and tsunami, along with The Rasmus, The 69 Eyes, Apocalyptica and Negative. In March, the band relocated to Los Angeles to begin work on its fifth studio album with producer Tim Palmer. That same month, Himmeetä valoa, a documentary about the group, premiered on Yle TV2. The following May, HIM released Love Metal Archives Vol. I, a collection of music videos, live performances and other bonus material. It debuted at number one in Finland and at number two in Germany. Within a few weeks, the collection had gone gold in Finland. On 26 September 2005, HIM released its fifth studio album Dark Light, which became the group's most successful album to date. It charted in sixteen countries, being certified platinum in Finland, as well as gold in Germany, the UK, and the US. Four singles were released, with "Wings of a Butterfly" and "Killing Loneliness" reaching number one and two, respectively, on the Finnish Singles Chart. The former also cracked the top ten in the UK. Dark Light received mixed reviews from critics. The New York Times described the material as "sturdier than ever", while Q Magazine called the album "a collection of irresistible pop-rock anthems". NME, meanwhile, described the record as "wimpy", while AllMusic branded it as "glossy and user-friendly". At the 2005 Emma Gala, Dark Light was named Rock Album of the Year, while "Wings of a Butterfly" received the award for Song of the Year.

In September 2005, HIM embarked on European club tour to promote Dark Light. This was followed by a North American leg in October. In December, HIM expanded its annual New Year's Eve show into a three day festival called Helldone, named so after the group's booking agent Tiina Welldone and the city of Helsinki. Following the shows, Linde Lindström fractured his wrist bone which forced HIM to postpone a tour of the UK and Ireland. In March 2006, HIM embarked on its first Australian tour, which was followed by the band's first shows in New Zealand and Japan. In September, HIM cancelled its forthcoming North American tour in order to begin work on a new album. Later that year, HIM released Uneasy Listening Vol. 1, a collection of rarities and alternate takes of previously released material. The album peaked at number seven in Finland, while the double single "In Joy and Sorrow / Pretending" reached number one.

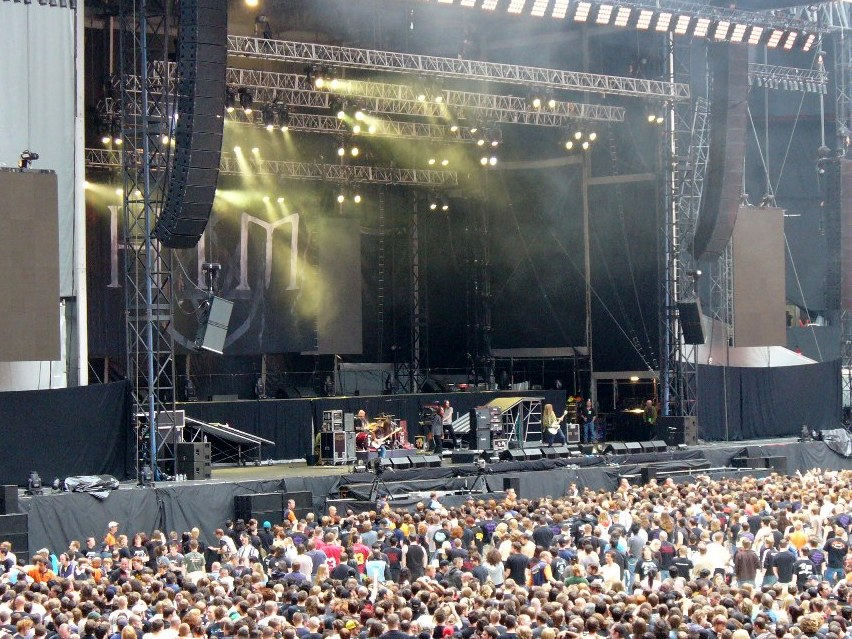
HIM performing at Wembley Stadium in July 2007

In February 2007, HIM began recording its sixth album at Finnvox Studios with producers Hiili Hiilesmaa and Tim Palmer. The making-of the album was plagued with problems in Ville Valo's personal life. His alcohol abuse had worsened, which resulted in him vomiting and defecating blood at one point. Things came to a head when Valo suffered a nervous breakdown during the recording process. While he did manage to recover momentarily, he began drinking again during the mixing process. Eventually Valo was admitted to the Promises Rehabilitation Clinic in Malibu by the band's manager Seppo Vesterinen. The album's release date was also pushed back from July to September 2007. In April, HIM released Uneasy Listening Vol. 2, which peaked at number twelve in Finland. From 25 July to 3 September 2007, HIM toured the US with Linkin Park on the Projekt Revolution Tour, which also included My Chemical Romance, Taking Back Sunday and Placebo. Prior to the tour, HIM held a contest for fans to win a trip to meet them at the trek's opening date in Seattle. The winners of the contest would also be featured on a forthcoming live DVD. In July, HIM played a number of concerts opening for Metallica, including a show at Wembley Stadium in London, England.

On 14 September 2007, HIM released its sixth studio album Venus Doom, which charted in the top ten in Finland, Germany, Switzerland and Austria. It also gave the band its highest US chart position to date at number twelve. The album would eventually go gold in Finland and Greece. "The Kiss of Dawn" and "Bleed Well" were released as singles, with the former peaking at number two in Finland. Venus Doom was well received by critics, with Spin calling the album "[maybe] the year's heaviest, creepiest, and sexiest hard-rock group effort", while NME declared it "an extremely well-executed pop-metal album." AllMusic gave the album three-and-a-half stars out of five and found the band "back on track and sounding more metal than ever." Venus Doom later garnered the band its first and only Grammy nomination for Best Boxed or Special Limited Edition Package. During the supporting tour, HIM recorded the live album Digital Versatile Doom at the Orpheum Theater in Los Angeles, California. Released on 29 April 2008, the album peaked at number ten in Finland. The 2008 edition of Helldone was expanded into a tour, which took the festival around Finland, before returning to the Tavastia Club on New Year's Eve.

=== 2009–2014: Screamworks: Love in Theory and Practice and Tears on Tape ===
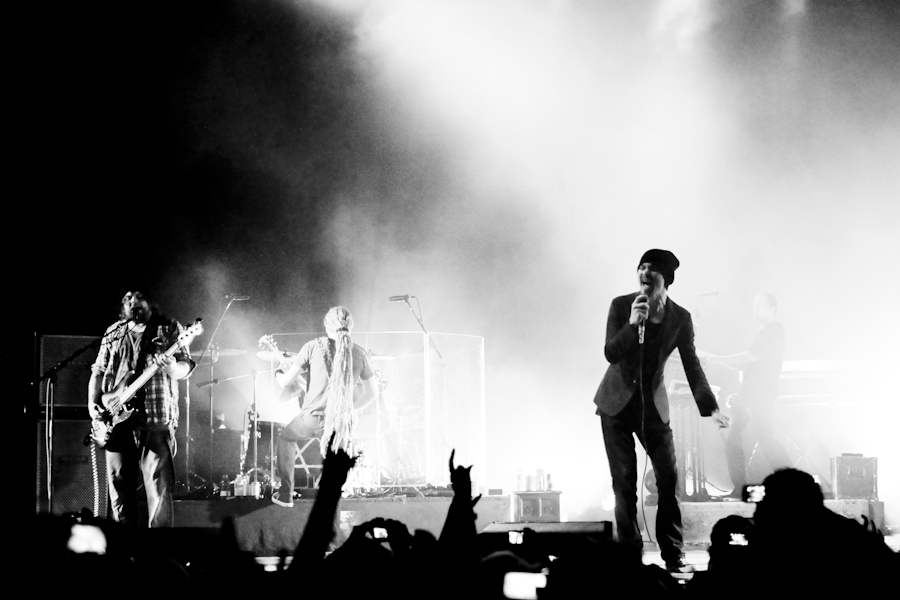
HIM performing in Los Angeles, California in April 2010

In August 2009, HIM entered the studio with producer Matt Squire to begin work on its seventh studio album. For the first time in the band's career, Valo worked completely sober, which resulted in the group rehearsing more than ever before. Titled Screamworks: Love in Theory and Practice, the album was released on 8 February 2010. It charted in ten countries, cracking the top ten in Finland, Germany, Switzerland and Austria. The album also reached number one on the UK Rock & Metal Albums Charts and the US Hard Rock Albums Chart. Screamworks was certified gold in Finland. "Heartkiller" and "Scared to Death" were released as singles, with the former peaking at number five in Finland. Screamworks was mostly well received by critics, with Alternative Press describing it as "ultimately successful in its blending of melody and muscle", while Billboard felt it was "a mixed bag, but an appealingly bold one." A supporting tour began in February 2010 with several showcase dates in Europe, followed by an Australian leg as a part of the Soundwave Festival. Beginning in March, the band toured the UK and the US. On 7 December 2010, HIM released SWRMXS, a remix album done in collaboration with various other artists, including as Tiësto, Morgan Page and Salem. The 2010 edition of Helldone was cancelled, as the band opted to take a break instead.

In March 2011, HIM announced it had parted ways with Sire Records, leaving the band without a label. Later that year, HIM began work on its eight studio album, but rehearsals were cut short when Gas Lipstick was diagnosed with a repetitive stress injury and nerve damage in his hands. Gas' injury required extensive rest, which left the band in limbo, unsure whether to break up or find a replacement. The band opted to wait and see if Gas' condition improved, and after eight months, they regrouped and resumed work on HIM's next album. Valo later credited Gas' recovery for helping revitalize the band. In October 2012, HIM released the compilation album XX – Two Decades of Love Metal. The collection was preceded by a cover of Ké's "Strange World", which was originally scheduled for release on 21 September 2012. However, due to an online leak, the release was pushed up to 7 September. XX – Two Decades of Love Metal peaked at number four in Finland. Following a two year hiatus, HIM also brought back the Helldone Festival in December 2012.

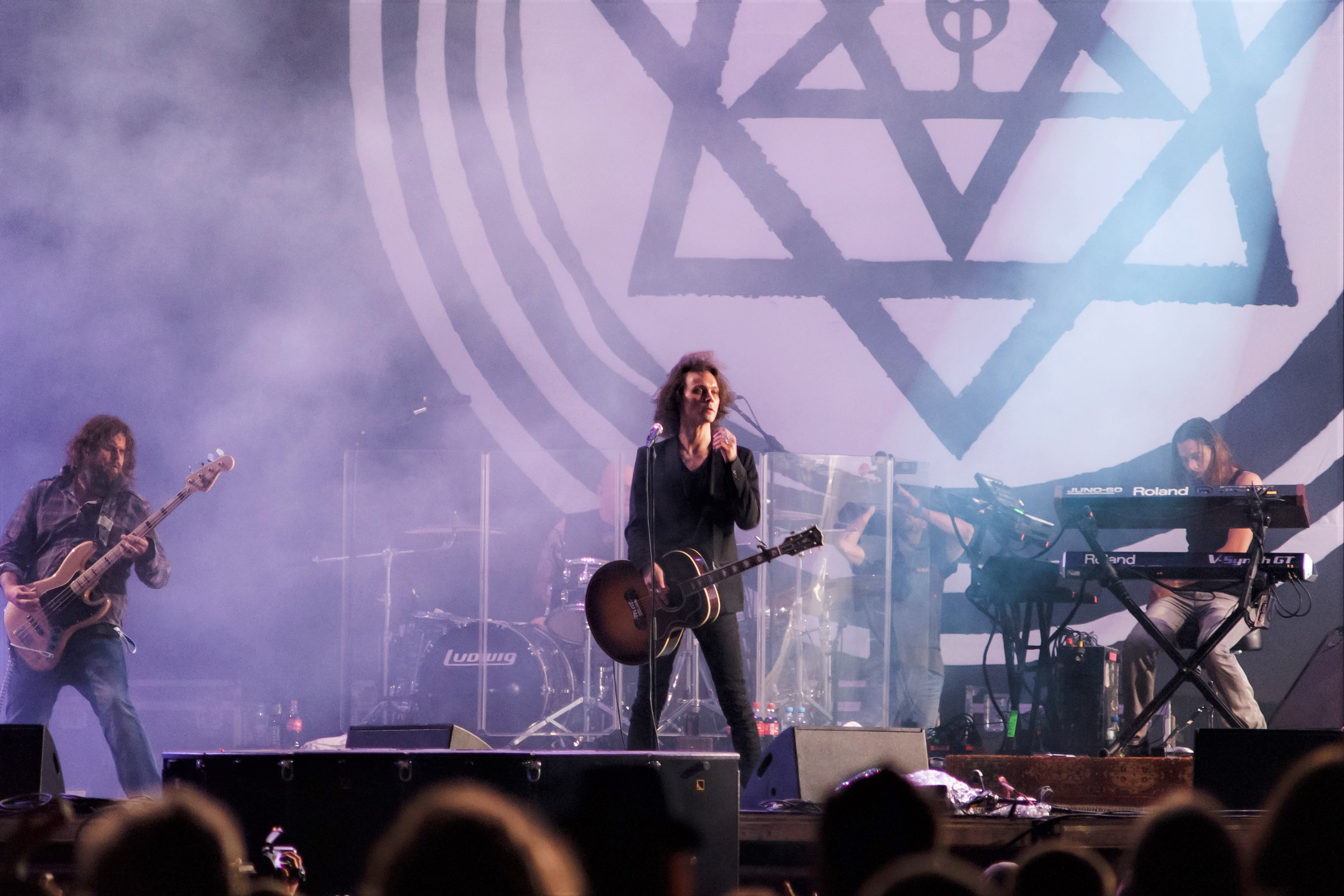
HIM performing at Ursynalia in June 2013

In February 2013, HIM announced that its forthcoming album would be released through Razor & Tie in North America, Double Cross in the UK and Ireland, and Universal Music in Europe. On 26 April 2013, the band released its eight studio album Tears on Tape, which was once again produced by Hiili Hiilesmaa and mixed by Tim Palmer. The record charted in nine countries, peaking at number two in Finland and Germany. In the US, the album reached number fifteen on the Billboard 200. Three singles were released, with "Into the Night" winning the Video of the Year award at the inaugural Noisecreep Creepies Awards. Tears on Tape received mostly positive reviews, with Classic Rock calling it "a glorious return to form for one of the world's most peculiarly successful bands". This was echoed by Alternative Press, who stated that "within HIM's impressive canon, it's among their best." Kerrang! gave a less-favorable review, stating: "Tears On Tape isn't bad [...] it's just not as seductive as HIM can be."

HIM was scheduled to begin its North American tour in support of Tears on Tape on 3 May 2013, but the tour was cancelled after Ville Valo suffered a severe asthma attack and was diagnosed with presumptive pneumonia. After Valo recuperated, HIM took part in the Rock Allegiance Tour, along with Volbeat, All That Remains and Airbourne. At the 2013 Revolver Golden Gods Awards, HIM received the award for Most Dedicated Fans. In March 2014, the band embarked on its first South American tour. That same month, HIM's first four albums were digitally reissued in the US by The End Records. In May 2014, the band was scheduled to perform in China for the first time, but the first show in Shanghai was cut short by local authorities, while the second in Beijing was cancelled altogether, due to bad weather conditions. In November 2014, HIM released Lashes to Ashes, Lust to Dust: A Vinyl Retrospective '96-'03, a box set containing the band's first four albums, along with 666 Ways To Love: Prologue, on 180-gram vinyl. In support, HIM embarked on the Love Metal Archives Tour in December 2014. The band also performed at Fields of the Nephilim's 30th anniversary shows in London, England.

=== 2015–2017: Final years and disbandment ===
On 27 January 2015, Gas Lipstick announced his departure from HIM, after 16 years with the band. In his announcement, Gas stated: "There is no drama, bad blood or any negativity involved in my departure. I simply feel that it's time for me to move on as a musician." HIM made its live debut following Gas's departure in July 2015, with a surprise show at the Qstock festival in Oulu, Finland. The show featured the debut of Gas' replacement, drummer Jukka "Kosmo" Kröger. Valo later stated that the band would begin work on a new album eventually, but no release date had been set. On 5 December 2015, HIM performed at Knotfest in Toluca, Mexico, with Slipknot, Megadeth, and Lamb of God, among others. In 2016, HIM took another hiatus, during which the band members focused on their various side projects. Because of this, the 2016 edition of Helldone was cancelled.

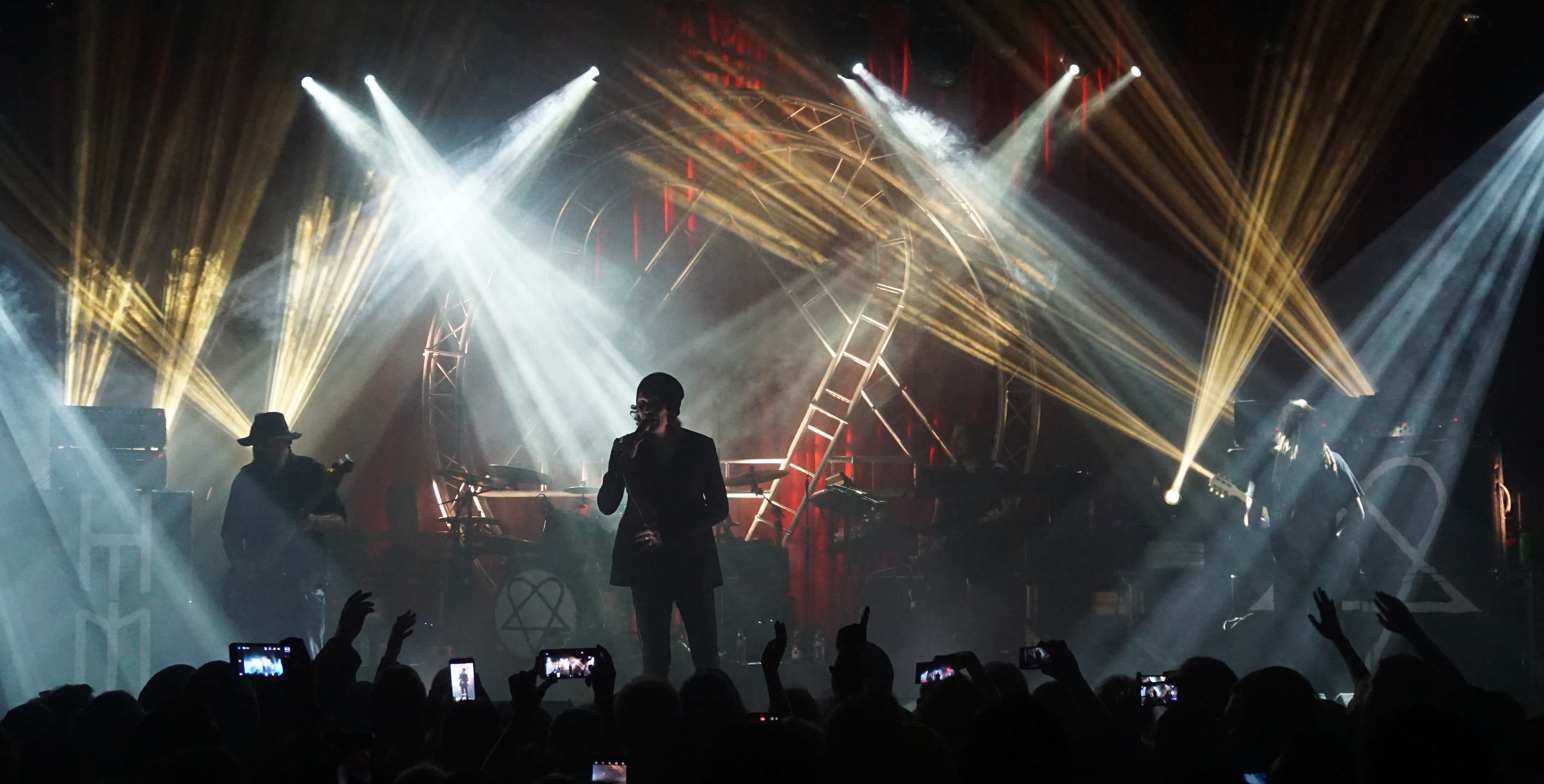
HIM performing in Manchester, England in December 2017

In October 2016, it was announced that HIM would be headlining the Tuska Open Air Metal Festival in 2017. In January 2017, HIM was also named the headliner of Miljoona Rock. On 5 March 2017, HIM announced that the band would be disbanding following a farewell tour later that year. In the announcement, Valo stated: "After quarter of a century [sic] of love and metal intertwined we sincerely feel HIM has run its unnatural course and adieus must be said in order to make way for sights, scents and sounds yet unexplored. We completed the pattern, solved the puzzle and turned the key. Thank you." Valo later elaborated on the band's decision to call it quits, stating: "We got together and started playing some songs and thinking whats next [...] We felt like the new material wasn't taking flight. We got along well together, but something was lacking. The stars weren't in alignment." He also went on to say that: "We felt like there was nothing left to give collectively. It was fun playing the old songs, everybody got along well together, but that spark was missing." Valo didn't rule out the possibility of the band reuniting in the future, stating: "The good thing about this is that there's no drama [...] So it doesn't hurt the chances."

A photo exhibition by Ville Juurikkala, titled HIM: Right Here in My Eyes, was held at the Helsinki Art Museum from 15 June to 3 July, featuring previously unseen photographs of the band preparing for its farewell tour. In November 2017, the exhibition was also held at the Morrison Hotel Gallery in New York City. HIM began its Bang and Whimper 2017 – The Farewell Tour on 14 June 2017 in Barcelona, Spain. The tour was generally well received, with the Nottingham Post stating that HIM "truly went out with a 'bang'". The band played its final show on New Year's Eve 2017 as a part of the Helldone Festival.

== Artistry ==
=== Musical style and lyrical themes ===
"When Love and Death Embrace" (1997)
"When Love and Death Embrace" has been described by Ville Valo as a good representation of HIM as a whole, featuring many of the band's key musical elements.

"Join Me in Death" (1999)
The lyrics to "Join Me in Death" caused some controversy upon release. It was accused of encouraging suicide, which Ville Valo denied, stating that the song was an interpretation of William Shakespeare's Romeo and Juliet.

Music critics have referred to the music of HIM as gothic rock, gothic metal, alternative rock, alternative metal, and dark rock. Kerrang! magazine's Sam Law described HIM's music as "blurring the lines between alt rock, goth and doom unlike anything that'd come before". The band has referred to its music as "love metal", the title of the group's fourth studio album. According to Ville Valo, the term "love metal" was coined as a response to people having difficulties categorizing HIM's music. Regarding HIM's reputation as a "goth band", Valo stated: "We can't do anything about that [label], but I think we are a special shade of goth, more tender than others. In Finnish tradition, our music is very melancholic." Valo has also described HIM's sound as "sentimental, hard-hitting rock music". The band's intent has always been to combine more melodic and melancholic elements, with its heavier influences. Valo has often cited Black Sabbath and Type O Negative as HIM's biggest sources of inspiration. Some of the band's other influences include Paradise Lost, Anathema, My Dying Bride, Cathedral, Electric Wizard, Monster Magnet and Norwegian black metal. Regarding HIM's sound, Valo has also stated that: "We never tried to claim that we have reinvented the wheel of rock 'n' roll. We've always been proud to be the torchbearers for Sabbath, Type O, Paradise Lost and Anathema, and a lot of those bands." Helsingin Sanomat felt HIM achieved "major crossover appeal" by combining "traditional Finnish melancholia" with "gothic lyrics, walls of metal guitars, and keyboard riffs."

On its debut album Greatest Lovesongs Vol. 666, HIM's sound was viewed by music critics as a combination of heavy metal, and 1980s rock and goth music. These influences were further explored on Razorblade Romance, which featured less focus on guitar, in favor of a sleeker production and a more melodic sound. HIM continued to explore what critics perceived as a more commercial sound on its third album Deep Shadows and Brilliant Highlights, which was met with mixed reactions. HIM's fourth album Love Metal is widely viewed by the band as the record where the group found its own sound, taking inspiration from bands such as Black Sabbath, Led Zeppelin and Iggy Pop. Dark Light was HIM's breakthrough album in the United States, and once again featured a glossier production. According to Valo, 2007's Venus Doom was written with the intent of creating a much heavier and darker follow-up, influenced by the likes of My Dying Bride, Anathema and Paradise Lost. Screamworks: Love in Theory and Practice took influences from bands of the 1980s, such as a-ha, Depeche Mode and the Cult, while Tears on Tape saw HIM returning to its roots, combining elements of the band's sound on every song, as opposed to having "a fast song followed by a slow song". Valo described Tears on Tape as a combination of Black Sabbath, the Smashing Pumpkins and Roy Orbison.

Lyrically the songs of HIM largely deal with themes of love. According to Valo: "I feel like there is no subject more important for a song than relationships. It's the only thing that moves me." Valo also takes inspiration from literature, but only certain aspects of it, explaining: "As a guy who writes songs, I get excited about an idea, or a book, or a sentence. I don't necessarily get excited about the whole of Tolkien, I just get excited about Uruk-hai. Just a little detail that just makes my mind work overdrive." Valo's lyrics have been described as "oozing with blood-dripping hearts and gothic melodrama".

=== Image ===
The heartagram is the trademarked symbol of HIM, created by Ville Valo

A central part of HIM's image has been the heartagram, which is the trademarked symbol of the band, created by vocalist Ville Valo on his twentieth birthday in 1996. A combination of a heart and a pentagram, the heartagram is meant to represent the juxtaposition of "the soft and the hard, the male and the female, the yin and the yang". Musically, the heart is also meant to represent the softer side of the band, while the pentagram symbolizes its heavier influences. This juxtaposition can also be seen in the band's album titles. On HIM's first album, the band used a heart with the number "666" written on it as the logo, which Valo later described as "a bit boring". The heartagram was first predominantly used on the cover of HIM's 2003 album Love Metal. It has since appeared on nearly all releases from the band. Valo has later stated that the heartagram "is probably the best thing I've ever come-up with", and that it's "worth a lot more than money" and "bigger than our band". The heartagram has made several appearances on television as well, including on Charmed, LA Ink, Viva La Bam and Criminal Minds.

In the band's early days, HIM's image was heavily characterized by occult and satanic imagery. The use of the number "666" was prominent in lyrics, as well as song and album titles. The band's original name "His Infernal Majesty" was also inspired by The Satanic Bible by Anton LaVey, the song "Oblivious to Evil" by Deicide, and Haile Selassie, who was known as "his imperial majesty". This flirtation with the occult was seen by the band as purely "symbolic" and "traditionally rock 'n' roll". Ville Valo first became interested in the occult while in school and soon began reading books on the subject. All of the band were also big fans of black metal. However, the group have maintained that none of them were seriously interested in satanism. Instead their interest was about mere "fascination", as well as a tongue in cheek hats off to their favorite bands. His Infernal Majesty eventually shortened its name to HIM in 1996, reportedly because Finnish people had difficulty remembering and pronouncing "His Infernal Majesty". In the years since, HIM toned down the use of satanic imagery even further. When asked about the band's image in 2013, Valo responded: "I think we're pretty much the same [offstage]. The only difference is I'm not necessarily wearing eyeliner every day."

On the band's first three albums, vocalist Ville Valo was featured solely on the cover. According to Valo, Greatest Lovesongs Vol. 666 was meant as combination of goth and eroticism, while Razorblade Romance was influenced by the 1980s, glam rock and pop music. Deep Shadows and Brilliant Highlights, meanwhile, took inspiration from Lou Reed, Patti Smith and late 1970s New York City art circles. Love Metal was the first album to prominently feature the heartagram on its cover, which was repeated on the follow-up Dark Light. For Venus Doom's cover, the band used a painting by David Harouni, which Valo had purchased while on tour in New Orleans. Screamworks: Love in Theory and Practice featured a photo of a late 19th century nun sculpture that Valo had purchased in Bavaria. On Tears on Tape, HIM used several paintings by Daniel P. Carter, along with a variation of the heartagram on the front cover.

=== Legacy ===
HIM is one of the most commercially successful Finnish bands of all time, with sales of over ten million albums worldwide. They are also the first Finnish group in history to receive a gold record in the United States. As one of the first Finnish bands to achieve major international success, HIM has been credited for paving the way for other Finnish groups, such as Children of Bodom and Sonata Arctica. HIM's manager Seppo Vesterinen recalled how before HIM "the success of Finnish bands [..] was confined to pretty small circles, it wasn't a global phenomenon". In 2015, HIM were one of six Finnish bands honored by the Finnish postal service by being featured on a new line of postage stamps designed by Klaus Welp. Publications such as Metal Hammer and Loudwire have ranked HIM among the best Finnish metal bands of all time.

"We've had the pleasure and honor to generate songs that have resonated with peoples' hearts. That's the magic of rock 'n' roll. I don't have the slightest clue as to why the band has generated such interest. You can't get that with money. It's miraculous."

— Ville Valo on HIM's connection with its audience.

Much of HIM's success has been attributed to Ville Valo. Along with his songwriting, a key component in HIM's success was Valo's image, which Helsingin Sanomat described as utilizing "the tried and true James Dean formula, wherein sensitivity and edginess combined." Metal Hammer described Valo as one of the few new "rockstars" of the early 2000s, stating: "HIM were like no other band. They had a special something, but more importantly they had a special someone. Ville shone like a star with his blend of Mick Jagger posturing and Brandon Lee's dark charms in The Crow". Loudwire ranked Valo as the fourteenth greatest metal frontman of the 21st century, stating: "His baritone voice is undeniably gorgeous, his vampiric charisma is almost hypnotic, male fans desperately attempt to emulate him and female fans scream ballistically as if he was the second coming of Elvis." Unlike other rock and metal bands, HIM also had a wide appeal, with BMG's Asko Kallonen recalling: "For example in England it was hard to grasp. There the split was usually clear: hard rock was for guys, pop was for girls. HIM was listened to by both." Tavastia Club owner Juhani Merimaa noted how the band's credibility in both the underground and mainstream, along with "melodic, catchy and good songs", paved the way for HIM to achieve major success. PopMatters, meanwhile, noted how HIM is "not the sort of act that conjures up a lukewarm response [as] people either like them or discredit them outright". Some of the major criticism directed towards the band have centered around the "formulaic" nature of its music and perceived "pandering" toward teenage goth fans. HIM's association with Bam Margera has also received some negative feedback.

The heartagram has also been a key factor in HIM's success, with Valo noting how the symbol has transcended the band, stating: "There are a lot of people who have them [tattooed] who don't actually know what it was, don't relate it to the band, and in that sense, I consider that to be my greatest achievement." Valo has also credited Bam Margera and Kat Von D for helping the band gain exposure through their work. HIM's music and the heartagram have been prominently featured in Margera's films and TV shows, as well as Von D's LA Ink. Margera was first introduced to HIM in May 2000, when he flew to Finland for a skateboarding competition and saw the band's music video on TV. He subsequently went out to a record store and bought the album Razorblade Romance. Regarding Margera's involvement in HIM's success, Valo stated: "It wasn't about secret handshakes between managers, he was just a random fella who came a-knocking on our door [...] and that's how the friendship started." Kat Von D, meanwhile, was introduced to HIM when the band was recording Dark Light in Los Angeles. She later appeared in the music video for "Killing Loneliness" and has gone on to do several tattoos for members of the band.

== Members ==
Final line-up

- Ville Valo – lead vocals, occasional keyboards and guitar (1995–2017), six-string bass (1991–1993), drums (1995)
- Mikko "Mige" Paananen – bass (1991–1993, 1995–2017), backing vocals (1995–2017)
- Mikko "Linde" Lindström – guitars (1995–2017), bass (1995)
- Janne "Burton" Puurtinen – keyboards, backing vocals (2001–2017)
- Jukka "Kosmo" Kröger – drums (2015–2017)

Former members

- Sami "Juippi" Jokilehto – drums (1991–1993)
- Juha Tarvonen – drums (1991–1993)
- Oskari "Oki" Kymäläinen – guitars (1996)
- Antto Melasniemi – keyboards (1996–1998)
- Juhana "Pätkä" Rantala – drums (1995–1999)
- Jussi-Mikko "Juska" Salminen – keyboards, backing vocals (1998–2000)
- Mika "Gas Lipstick" Karppinen – drums (1999–2015)

== Discography ==
- Greatest Lovesongs Vol. 666 (1997)
- Razorblade Romance (2000)
- Deep Shadows and Brilliant Highlights (2001)
- Love Metal (2003)
- Dark Light (2005)
- Venus Doom (2007)
- Screamworks: Love in Theory and Practice (2010)
- Tears on Tape (2013)

== Awards ==
Emma Gala

Year	Nominee / work	Award	Result	Ref.
1997	HIM	Newcomer of the Year	Won	
1997	Greatest Lovesongs Vol. 666	Debut Album of the Year	Won	
1999	HIM	Export of the Year	Won	
2000	HIM	Band of the Year	Won	
2000	Razorblade Romance	Album of the Year	Won	
2001	HIM	Export of the Year	Won	
2003	Love Metal	Hard Rock / Metal Album of the Year	Nominated	
2003	HIM	Band of the Year	Nominated	
2005	Dark Light	Rock Album of the Year	Won	
2005	"Wings of a Butterfly"	Song of the Year	Won	
2005	Dark Light	Album of the Year	Nominated	
2005	Love Metal Archives Vol. I	DVD of the Year	Nominated	
2005	HIM	Domestic Artist of the Year (Public Vote)	Nominated	
2007	Venus Doom	Rock Album of the Year	Nominated	
2010	HIM	Band of the Year	Nominated	
2010	Screamworks: Love in Theory and Practice	Metal Album of the Year	Nominated	
2010	"Heartkiller"	Video of the Year	Nominated	
2013	HIM	Artist of the Year (Public Vote)	Nominated	

VIVA Comet Awards

Year	Nominee / work	Award	Result	Ref.
2000	HIM	Viewers' Choice Award	Won	
2000	"Join Me in Death"	Video of the Year	Won	
2001	HIM	Viewers' Choice Award	Won	

Kerrang! Awards

Year	Nominee / work	Award	Result	Ref.
2003	Love Metal	Best Album	Nominated	
2004	"The Funeral of Hearts"	Best Video	Won	
2004	"The Funeral of Hearts"	Best Single	Nominated	
2004	HIM	Best Band on the Planet	Nominated	
2005	HIM	Best Band on the Planet	Nominated	
2006	HIM	Best Band on the Planet	Nominated	

Hungarian Music Awards

Year	Nominee / work	Award	Result	Ref.
2001	Razorblade Romance	Best Foreign Rock Album	Nominated	
2006	Dark Light	Best Foreign Rock Album	Nominated	

IFPI Platinum Europe Awards

Year	Nominee / work	Award	Result	Ref.
2004	Razorblade Romance	IFPI Platinum Europe Award	Won	

Echo Music Prize

Year	Nominee / work	Award	Result	Ref.
2001	HIM	Best International Group	Nominated	
2002	HIM	Best International Alternative	Nominated	

Grammy Awards

Year	Nominee / work	Award	Result	Ref.
2007	Venus Doom	Best Boxed or Special Limited Edition Package	Nominated	

Revolver Golden Gods Awards

Year	Nominee / work	Award	Result	Ref.
2013	HIM	Most Dedicated Fans	Won	

Noisecreep Creepies Awards

Year	Nominee / work	Award	Result	Ref.
2014	"Into the Night"	Video of the Year	Won	

MTV Europe Music Awards

Year	Nominee / work	Award	Result	Ref.
2005	HIM	Best Finnish Act	Nominated	
2007	HIM	Best Finnish Act	Nominated	
2008	HIM	Best Finnish Act	Nominated	

== See also ==
- List of best-selling music artists in Finland
- Music of Finland
- Rock music in Finland
