= Heartkiller =

Single by HIM

from the album Screamworks: Love in Theory and Practice
- Released: December 7, 2009 (download); February 5, 2010 (CD)
- Recorded: 2008–2009
- Genre: Alternative rock
- Length: 3:29
- Songwriter: Ville Valo
- Producer: Matt Squire

HIM singles chronology
"The Kiss of Dawn" (2007)	"Heartkiller" (2009)	"Strange World" (2012)

"Heartkiller" is a song by Finnish rock band HIM. It is the third track on their seventh studio album Screamworks: Love in Theory and Practice (2010), and was released in December 2009 as the second single from the album.

== Music video ==
The music video for "Heartkiller" premiered on the band's MySpace page on January 7, 2010, and appeared on their official website and YouTube page a day later.

== Track listing ==
U.S./Finland iTunes single

1. "Heartkiller" – 3:29

Finnish CD and UK iTunes store

1. "Heartkiller" – 3:29
2. "Shatter Me with Hope (The Sword of Democles)" – 4:13
3. "Heartkiller (Moordeb VRS)" – 3:24

Sweden and Germany CD single

1. "Heartkiller"
2. "Shatter Me With Hope (The Sword of Democles)"

== Charts ==
Chart (2009/2010)	Peak position
Finnish Singles Chart	5
German Singles Chart	34
Hot Mainstream Rock Tracks	30
