= Strange World (song) =

Single by Ké

Single by Ké

from the album I am [ ]
- Released: 1995
- Genre: Alternative rock (original); Dance-pop (remix)
- Length: 4:32 (album version)
- Label: RCA
- Songwriters: Ké, M. Prendergast
- Producers: Rick Neigher, Ké

Ké singles chronology
"Strange World" (1995)	"Someday" (1996)

"Strange World" is a song by American singer Ké and the lead single from the debut album I am [ ]. It was produced by Rick Neigher and Ké and written by Ké and Michael Prendergast. The song was released in 1995 by RCA Records and became a smash hit in Europe that year, topping the airplay charts in countries such as Italy and Germany. A dance remix of the track by Junior Vasquez topped the Billboard Dance/Club Play chart in 1996. The single sold around 3 million copies worldwide. Finnish band HIM released a cover of the song for their 2012 compilation album XX - Two Decades of Love Metal. In 2016, Ké appeared on a version of "Strange World" by Italian band Matmata.

== Music video ==
The video clip of Strange World, directed by Sophie Muller, was produced by the Oil Factory. In the video the singer Kè enters the toilet of a public bathroom where, after undressing, he begins to sing the song. In the other toilets you can see several people, including two little boys throwing toilet paper at each other, a lady carefully cleaning the door handle, a girl eating a sandwich, a young lesbian couple, and finally a boy taking refuge in a toilet, chased by a group of people. In some sequences Kè is shown hanging upside down and painted completely white.

== Track listings and formats ==
- 12" Vinyl single (RCA 74321 34941 1)
1. A1 – "Strange World (album version)" – 4:32
2. A2 – "Strange World (Junior's Sound Factory mix)" – 9:45
3. B1 – "Strange World (Tribalistic dub)" – 8:09
4. B2 – "Strange World (Junior's Strange mix edit)" – 11:27
- 12" Vinyl single (RCA RDAB-64371-1)
1. A1 – "Strange World (Junior's Sound Factory mix)" – 9:45
2. A2 – "Strange World (LP version)" – 4:32
3. B1 – "Strange World (Tribalistic mix)" – 8:10
4. B2 – "Strange World (Padapella)" – 6:07
- 12" Vinyl single (RCA KE 96)
1. A1 – "Strange World (LP version)" – 9:45
2. A2 – "Strange World (Junior's Sound Factory mix)" – 4:32
3. B1 – "Someday (LP version)" – 8:10
4. B2 – "Someday (alternate radio mix)" – 6:07
5. B3 – "Someday (Harder Dance mix)" – 6:07
- U.S. 12" Vinyl promo single (RCA RDJ 64494–2)
1. "Strange World (edit)" – 4:01
2. "Strange World (Chris Shaw edited mix)" – 3:53
3. "Strange World (album version)" – 4:32
- U.K. CD single (RCA 7863 64371 2)
1. "Strange World (Junior's Sound Factory Mix)" – 9:45
2. "Strange World (LP version)" – 4:32
3. "Strange World (Tribalistic mix)" – 8:10
4. "Strange World (Padapella)" – 6:07
- U.K. CD single (RCA 74321 34941 2)
1. "Strange World (radio edit)" – 3:53
2. "Strange World (Padapella)" – 6:07
3. "Strange World (Junior's Sound Factory mix)" – 9:45
4. "All You Ever Wanted" – 4:27
- Germany CD maxi-single (74321335582)
1. "Strange World (short)" – 3:53
2. "Strange World (long)" – 4:32
3. "All You Ever Wanted" – 4:27

== Charts ==
=== Weekly charts ===
Chart (1996)	Peak position
Germany	89
Italy	7
Italy Airplay (Music & Media)	5
UK	73
US Dance club songs	9

== HIM version ==
"Strange World"

Single by HIM

from the album XX - Two Decades of Love Metal
- Released: September 2012
- Recorded: 2012
- Genre: Rock
- Length: 4:10
- Songwriters: Ké, M. Prendergast
- Producer: HIM

HIM singles chronology
"Scared to Death" (2010)	"Strange World" (2012)	"Into the Night" (2013)

In 2012, the Finnish rock band HIM covered "Strange World" for their second compilation album, XX - Two Decades of Love Metal. It is the only previously unreleased track on the album. It was released as a single and has a music video.
