= The Kiss of Dawn =

Single by HIM

from the album Venus Doom
- Released: 28 July 2007
- Recorded: 2007
- Songwriter(s): Ville Valo
- Producer(s): HIM

HIM singles chronology
"Killing Loneliness" (2006)	"The Kiss of Dawn" (2007)	"Heartkiller" (2009)

"The Kiss of Dawn" is a song by Finnish band HIM. It is the fourth track from the band's sixth studio album Venus Doom (2007), and was released on 28 July 2007 as the album's lead single.

== Content ==
Ville Valo has stated that the song was written for a close friend who committed suicide soon after the band wrapped the recording sessions for Dark Light. Sheet music for the song was posted on their official website prior to the release of either the single or the album, giving fans from the US the chance to submit a video of themselves playing the song from their own perspective. The 3 winning videos were featured on HIM's then-upcoming live DVD and the winners received a signed copy of the said DVD.

== Music video ==
The music video was directed by Meiert Avis, who previously directed "Wings of a Butterfly" for the group. HIM started recording the music video on 21 June in the Los Angeles area. The production team put out a casting call for a "beautiful girl" to perform the lead role in the video. Auditions were held on 19 June. The music video was released 24 July 2007. Clues leading to a secret code, "Ten Point Six", was included in the video. "Ten Point Six" is a quote from the book The Third Policeman by Brian O'Nolan.

== Track listing ==
These are the formats and track listings of major single releases of "The Kiss of Dawn".

- Finnish CD single
1. "The Kiss of Dawn" (Radio edit)
2. "Venus Doom" (Radio edit)
- UK 7" picture disc #1, UK 2 track CD single & International 2 track CD single:
1. "The Kiss of Dawn" – 5:55
2. "Passion's Killing Floor" (Herpé remix) – 3:45
- UK 7" picture disc #2:
1. "The Kiss of Dawn" – 5:55
2. "Love in Cold Blood" (acoustic) – 2:44
- International maxi CD single & International maxi digital single:
1. "The Kiss of Dawn" – 5:55
2. "Passion's Killing Floor" (Herpé remix) – 3:45
3. "Love in Cold Blood" (acoustic) – 2:44
- U.S. Hot Topic exclusive single
1. "The Kiss of Dawn" - 5:55
2. "The Kiss of Dawn" (Demo) - 4:57
- EU DVD Promo
1. "The Kiss of Dawn" (Video)

== Charts ==
Chart	Peak position
Czech Republic (Rádio – Top 100)	62
Finnish Singles Chart	2
German Singles Chart	44
Swedish Singles Chart	30
UK Singles Chart	59
UK Rock Chart	1
