= Screamworks: Love in Theory and Practice =

Screamworks: Love in Theory and Practice, Chapters 1–13

Studio album by HIM
- Released: 8 February 2010
- Recorded: 2009
- Studios: The Lair Studio in Los Angeles, California; NRG Studios in North Hollywood, California
- Genres: Alternative rock; hard rock
- Length: 46:55
- Label: Sire
- Producer: Matt Squire

HIM chronology
Digital Versatile Doom (2008)	Screamworks: Love in Theory and Practice, Chapters 1–13 (2010)	SWRMXS (2010)

Singles from Screamworks: Love in Theory and Practice, Chapters 1–13
- 1. "Heartkiller" Released: 8 December 2009; 2. "Scared to Death" Released: 29 March 2010

Screamworks: Love in Theory and Practice, Chapters 1–13 is the seventh studio album by Finnish rock band HIM. Released on 8 February 2010, the album was recorded at The Lair Studios and NRG Studios in Los Angeles with producer Matt Squire. Following his time in rehab, Screamworks was the first HIM album vocalist Ville Valo worked on completely sober. This resulted in the band rehearsing the material more than ever before, as Valo had set out to prove himself and the band following his new-found sobriety. Musically Screamworks featured a more accessible and straightforward sound than many of its predecessor, reminiscent of the music of the 1980s. Much of the album's material was inspired by Valo's relationship with an undisclosed partner, whom he referred to as his muse for the record.

Screamworks received generally positive reviews from critics. Valo's vocals and songwriting received praise, although the "lighter" tone of the album received mixed opinions. Screamworks charted in eleven countries, including the top ten in Finland, Germany, Austria and Switzerland, eventually being certified gold in the band's home country. Two singles were also released, with "Heartkiller" peaking at number five in Finland. The release of Screamworks was followed by a world tour, starting with several European dates and a tour of Australia as a part of the Soundwave Festival. This was then followed-up by several dates throughout the UK and the US in 2010. In December 2010, HIM released a companion album to Screamworks, titled SWRMXS, featuring remixes done by various different artists, such as Tiësto and Morgan Page.

== Composition ==
HIM began rehearsing material for a new album in February 2009. The band soon teamed up with producer Matt Squire, who had previously worked with The Used, Taking Back Sunday and Panic! at the Disco among others. Over the course of three months, Squire and the band rearranged much of the material and rehearsed more, before entering The Lair Studio in Los Angeles in August 2009. Screamworks was also the band's first album that vocalist Ville Valo worked on completely sober following his time in rehab, which also played a part in the group rehearsing more than ever before. According to Valo, he set out to prove all he could do with Screamworks, but he later remarked that in hindsight the excessive rehearsing wore much of the band out, particularly drummer Mika "Gas Lipstick" Karppinen, who had recently become a father.

Additional recording for the album was also done at NRG Studios in North Hollywood, while the album was mixed at Paramount Studios by Neal Avron. Screamworks was then mastered by Ted Jensen at Sterling Sound in New York, with Valo receiving the album's first master on Halloween. The album's title was partly inspired by the book Magick in Theory and Practice by Aleister Crowley, DreamWorks, and The Scream by Edvard Munch. Another title considered for the album was Pick Up Lines from Hell, which was taken from the lyrics of the song "Scared to Death". Ultimately the title was deemed to be too "joky". The cover art of Screamworks is a picture taken of a late 19th-century nun sculpture, that Valo had purchased in Bavaria. The picture was edited in Photoshop to include another set of eyes and a mouth, after which it was silkscreened in the style of Andy Warhol. The cover art was also influenced by 1980s British new wave acts, such as Siouxsie and the Banshees and Ultravox.

== Music and lyrics ==
Musically Valo has described Screamworks as a "lighter shade of black", being more "direct" and "straightforward" than some of HIM's previous albums. The album was heavily influenced by music of the 1980s, including such acts as a-ha, Depeche Mode and The Cult, and also featured a bigger focus on keyboards to counterbalance the guitar-centric sound of the band's previous album Venus Doom. Screamworks has thus been described as one of the band's most accessible albums to date, sounding more "hopeful" and "poppy". Thematically the album was largely inspired by a relationship of Valo's with an undisclosed partner, who served as his muse while writing the material.

"Scared to Death" (2010)
"Scared to Death" has been described as "joyful and vulnerable", and displays the more straightforward and accessible sound of Screamworks.

"In Verene Veritas" makes use of a Casio SK-1 sampling keyboard, which was included on the insistence of Valo. "Scared to Death" was described by Valo as lyrically being a simplified version of the album's theme about "trying to get back to life, have a bit of hope in yourself". The song also makes mention of the novel Sense and Sensibility by Jane Austen, and was also described by Valo as being the album's most straightforward "pop song", containing elements of Hüsker Dü, Foo Fighters and "The NeverEnding Story" by Limahl. "Heartkiller" was originally titled "The Biblical Sense", and makes mention of the biblical figure Lazarus and Frankenstein by Mary Shelley. Lyrically the song talks about "opening the door for new possibilities, and not trying to be afraid of new things and things that might hurt you". "Dying Song" had already been partially written in 1996, and lyrically talks about having to "go to the depths of Hell, to appreciate the glimpse of Heaven". "Disarm Me (With Your Loneliness)" is performed in 3/4 tempo, and was described by Valo as being HIM's "first attempt in the realm of classic rock ballad[s]". The song had originally been demoed in 2003 with producer Hiili Hiilesmaa, and considered for the band's 2005 album Dark Light. Valo singled the song out as one of his favorites from Screamworks, and lyrically talks about "teasing people into believing that you still have that much hope for something life-changing, and at the very last minute the carpet's being taken from underneath you".

Valo described "Love, the Hardest Way" as being "retro HIM", with a "Billy Idol -vibe", while the song's chorus also mentions French poet Charles Baudelaire and lyrically deals with "the illogical in relationships in general". "Katherine Wheel" was partly inspired by the Christian saint Catherine of Alexandria, and lyrically deals with "the submissive nature of a relationship". "In the Arms of Rain" was inspired by a childhood memory of Valo's, of him and his younger brother running in the rain, while "Ode to Solitude" was described as a "celebration of the painful aspects of relationships". "Shatter Me with Hope" makes mention of the mythical figures Damocles and Cassandra, and King Solomon, while the line "turn to page 43, and you'll know how I feel" was meant as a direct message to Valo's "muse" for the album. "Acoustic Funeral (For Love in Limbo)" was described by Valo as the "lullaby from hell", with elements of This Mortal Coil, while the title was a tribute to Black Sabbath and their song "Electric Funeral". Lyrically the song is partly an interpretation of the Latin proverb Memento mori. "Like St. Valentine" was the first song the band worked on for the album, and was described by Valo as "punky" and a "rough, rocking, fast track". Valo described "The Foreboding Sense of Impending Happiness" as the most experimental song on the album and took influence from Giorgio Moroder and "Take My Breath Away" by Berlin, which Moroder co-wrote.

== Release and promotion ==
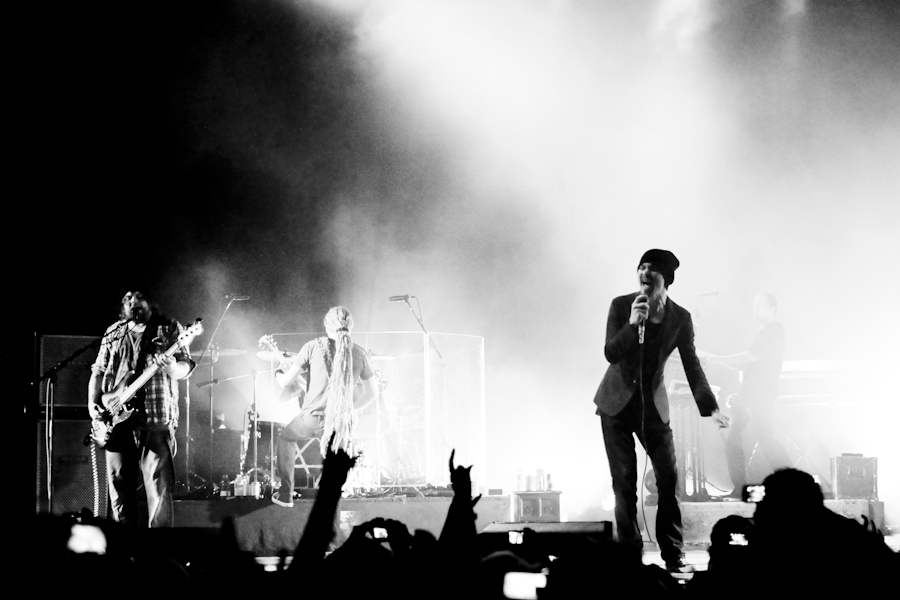
HIM performing in Los Angeles in April 2010

"Heartkiller" was released as the first single from Screamworks in December 2009, and charted in five countries, including at number five in Finland. A music video was also produced, which was released on 8 January 2010. The band originally approached Italian film director Dario Argento to helm the music video, but he reportedly got "stuck in traffic" and was unable to meet with the band. At the 2009 edition of HIM's New Year's Eve festival Helldone, the band debuted three song live from Screamworks; "Heartkiller", "Scared to Death" and "Love, the Hardest Way". Screamwork: Love in Theory and Practice was released on 8 February 2010, and charted in eleven countries, including at number two in Finland, number four in Germany, number seven in Austria and Switzerland, and at number 25 in the United States. The album was eventually certified gold in Finland. A special two-disc edition of the album was also released, which included an acoustic bonus CD of the album, titled Baudelaire in Braille. HIM was later nominated for "Band of the Year" at the 2010 Emma Awards, while Screamworks and "Heartkiller" received nominations for "Metal Album of the Year" and "Video of the Year" respectively.

HIM began the supporting tour for Screamworks in February 2010 with several showcase dates in Europe, before starting an Australian tour as a part of the Soundwave Festival. From March to May 2010, the band embarked on a tour of the UK and the US, with We Are the Fallen, Dommin and Drive A acting as support in the latter. On 23 February 2010, HIM teamed up with Harmonix and MTV Games to release a downloadable song pack for the video game Rock Band, which included two tracks from Screamworks; "Heartkiller" and "Ode to Solitude", along with "Wings of a Butterfly". "Scared to Death" was released as the second single from Screamworks, with a music video also premiering on 22 March 2010. In November 2010, HIM announced the release of a remix album of Screamworks, titled SWRMXS, on 7 December. The album was done in collaboration with several different artists, including Tiësto, Salem and Morgan Page, and was physically released in the US exclusively through Hot Topic. The Huoratron remix of "In Venere Veritas" was also released as a promotional single from the album.

== Reception ==
Professional ratings
Aggregate scores
Source	Rating
Metacritic	61/100
Review scores
Source	Rating
AllMusic	3/5 stars
Classic Rock	5/10 stars
Imperiumi.net	10/10
Rock Sound	7/10
Rumba	5/5 stars
Soundi	3/5 stars
Spin	6/10

Screamworks: Love in Theory and Practice received generally positive reviews from critics, with a score of 61 out of 100 on Metacritic. Mape Ollila of Imperiumi.net gave the album ten out of ten, and called it HIM's best album to date. He praised Valo's performance, and described the album as containing "at least six or seven radio singles". Rumba's Jean Ramsay felt similarly, awarding the album five stars out of five, and hailing it as "possibly" HIM's best record. He described Screamworks as "unashamedly romantic, poppy and hedonistic" and praised it for redefining the band's sound. He did criticize the album as "too long", but concluded his review stating: "If this record doesn't elevate HIM into superstars, I don't understand anything in this world." Alternative Press described Screamworks as "ultimately successful in its blending of melody and muscle", while Billboard called it "a mixed bag, but an appealingly bold one". Marko Säynekoski of Soundi gave Screamworks three stars out of five, and stated that the album "brings forth plenty of memorable moments and the whole is skillfully constructed". He singled out "Heartkiller" and "Ode to Solitude" as particular highlights and commended Valo's ability to write so many potential "hits".

Rock Sound gave the album seven out of ten, and described it as "a solid album, rife with brooding love metal and big choruses". The magazine also stated that Screamworks "still channels the HIM spirit, allowing melancholy and compassion to creep in and out of the 13 tracks", but criticized it as being the band's most "unpalatable" album, stating: "Ville takes one step too many towards self-satire". James Christopher Monger of AllMusic felt similarly, criticizing some of the lyrics as "embarrassing", and calling the album "predictable". He did however award the album three stars out of five and described the material as sitting "within the band’s canon well enough to please longtime fans". John Dolan of Spin gave Screamworks six out of ten and described the album as sounding like "a pro forma emo-fed hard rock band with some likably silly Euro-doom flourishes." He still concluded his review by calling the album "more interesting than it’s designed to be." Dom Lawson of Classic Rock was even less positive and described the album as "too fey for the metal crowd, too knowingly accessible for hardcore goths and just a little bit too far from the mainstream radar to reach the pop fans [Ville Valo's] melodies seem to pursue".

Ville Valo later considered the album a "failure" in terms of commercial success, but in 2017 revisited Screamworks, and described it as "maybe the album that's mine the most", stating: "My influences came through the most on that one. We might have mixed it too much like American rock." Loudwire later ranked Screamworks lowest in the band's discography, describing it as "saturated in daisychained, pop-friendly moods that have more in common with nasal-toned emo groups than anything else in the band's catalog." On the other hand, Kaaoszine ranked the album as HIM's best record, stating that "Screamworks is irresistibly catchy pop metal, that still hides a strong dose of HIM's trademark dark melancholy beneath the surface".

== Track listing ==
All tracks written by Ville Valo.

No.	Title	Length
1.	"In Venere Veritas"	3:36
2.	"Scared to Death"	3:41
3.	"Heartkiller"	3:29
4.	"Dying Song"	3:32
5.	"Disarm Me (With Your Loneliness)"	3:59
6.	"Love, the Hardest Way"	3:19
7.	"Katherine Wheel"	3:26
8.	"In the Arms of Rain"	3:47
9.	"Ode to Solitude"	3:58
10.	"Shatter Me with Hope"	3:52
11.	"Acoustic Funeral (For Love in Limbo)"	3:58
12.	"Like St. Valentine"	3:15
13.	"The Foreboding Sense of Impending Happiness"	3:03
Total length:		46:55

iTunes bonus tracks
No.	Title	Length
14.	"Heartkiller" (live at Helldone)	3:35
15.	"Love, the Hardest Way" (live at Helldone)	3:25
Total length:		51:30

iTunes pre-order bonus tracks
No.	Title	Length
14.	"Heartkiller" (live at Helldone)	3:35
15.	"Love, the Hardest Way" (live at Helldone)	3:25
16.	"Scared to Death" (live at Helldone)	3:48
Total length:		54:38

Baudelaire in Braille bonus disc
No.	Title	Length
1.	"In Venere Veritas" (acoustic)	2:30
2.	"Scared to Death" (acoustic)	2:59
3.	"Heartkiller" (acoustic)	3:10
4.	"Dying Song" (acoustic)	2:44
5.	"Disarm Me (with Your Loneliness)" (acoustic)	3:34
6.	"Love, the Hardest Way" (acoustic)	2:34
7.	"Katherine Wheel" (acoustic)	3:31
8.	"In the Arms of Rain" (acoustic)	3:02
9.	"Ode to Solitude" (acoustic)	3:08
10.	"Shatter Me with Hope" (acoustic)	2:42
11.	"Acoustic Funeral (For Love in Limbo)" (acoustic)	3:19
12.	"Like St. Valentine" (acoustic)	3:04
13.	"The Foreboding Sense of Impending Happiness" (acoustic)	2:11
Total length:		38:28

== Personnel ==
HIM

- Ville Valo − lead vocals, artwork, art direction
- Mikko "Linde" Lindström − guitar
- Mikko "Mige" Paananen − bass
- Janne "Burton" Puurtinen − keyboards
- Mika "Gas Lipstick" Karppinen − drums

Production

- Matt Squire − producer
- Travis Huff − engineer
- Steve Tippeconnic − recording assistant
- Tate Hall − recording assistant
- Dave Colvin – recording assistant
- Neal Avron − mixer
- Nicholas Fournier – mixing assistant
- Ted Jensen – mastering
- Craig Aaronson – A&R
- Larry Goetz – programming
- David Roemer – photography
- Matt Taylor – artwork
- Varnish Studio Inc – art direction
- 2Rabbits Studios – screen prints

== Charts ==
Chart (2010)	Peak position
Australian Albums Chart	36
Austrian Albums Chart	7
Dutch Albums Chart	44
Finnish Albums Chart	2
German Albums Chart	4
Hungarian Albums Chart	21
Italian Albums Chart	68
Spanish Albums Chart	27
Swedish Albums Chart	21
Swiss Albums Chart	7
UK Albums Chart	50
US Alternative Albums	2
US Billboard 200	25
US Hard Rock Albums	1
US Top Rock Albums	2

== Certifications ==
Region	Certification	Certified units/sales
Finland (Musiikkituottajat)	Gold	15,101
