= Ville Valo =

Finnish singer

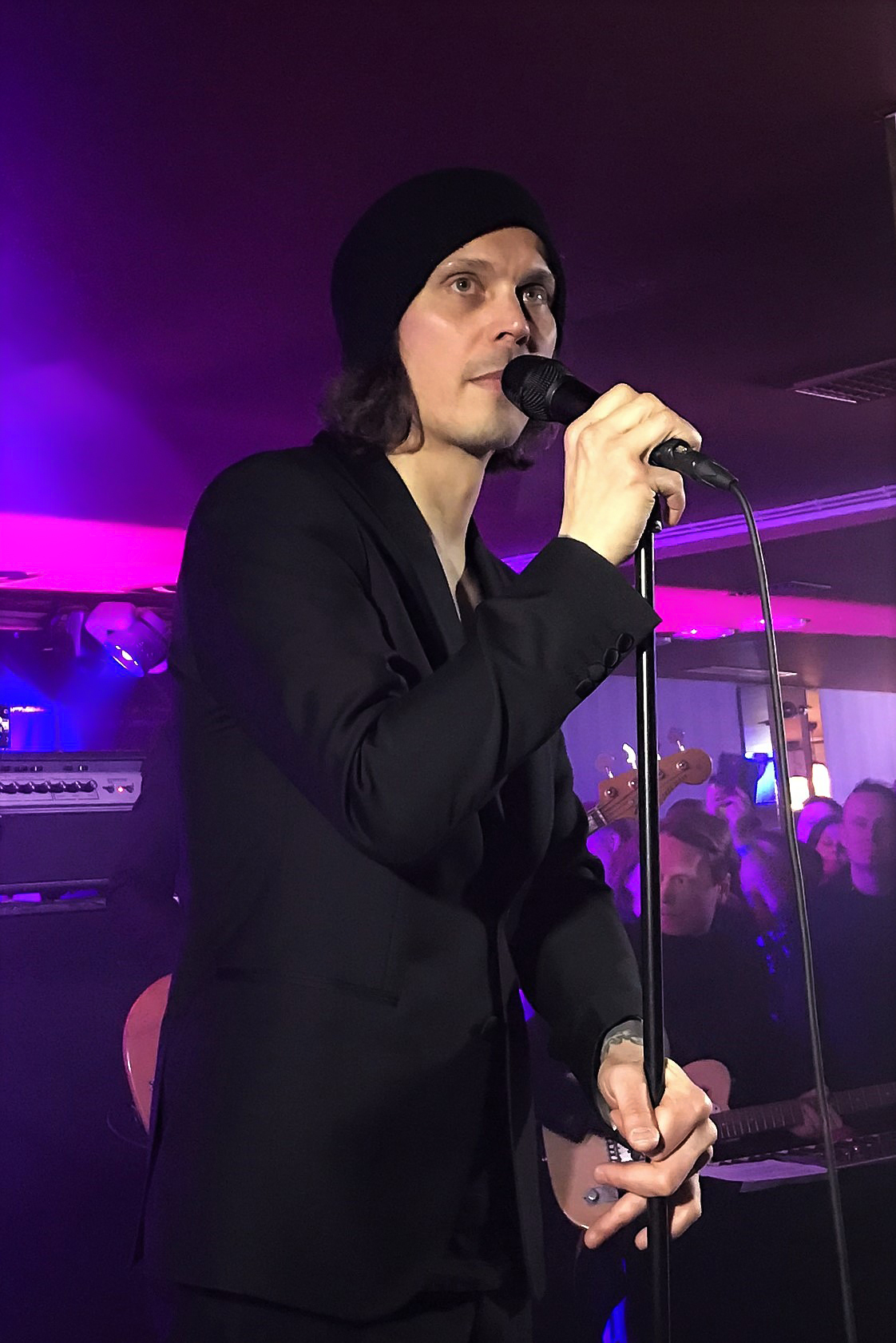
- Valo performing with Agents in 2019
- Born: 22 November 1976 (age 50); Helsinki, Finland
- Other names: Balo the Singing Janitor; Bil Bao; Lux Airam; Rambo Rimbaud; VV
- Occupations: Singer; songwriter; musician; producer
- Relatives: Jesse Valo (brother)
- Musical career
- Instruments: Vocals; keyboards; guitar; bass; drums
- Years active: 1991–present
- Labels: BMG; Sire; Razor & Tie; Double Cross; Universal Music Group; Spinefarm
- Formerly of: HIM; Daniel Lioneye; Agents

Signature
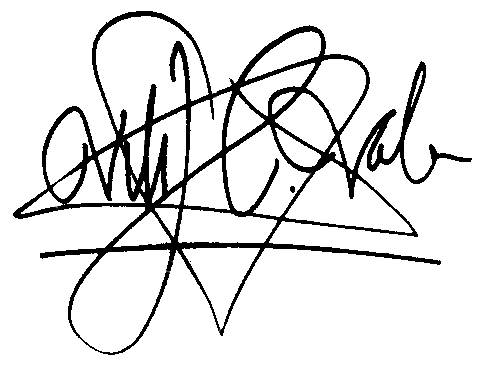

Ville Hermanni Valo (pronounced [ˈʋilːe ˈʋɑlo]; born 22 November 1976) is a Finnish singer, songwriter and musician. He is best known as the vocalist of the gothic rock band HIM.

Valo began his career playing bass and drums in various bands around the city. In 1991, he co-founded and became the singer and main songwriter of HIM, which would go on to become one of the most successful Finnish bands of all time and the first to receive a gold record in the United States. Outside of HIM, Valo has collaborated with various other bands and artists during his career, including Agents, The 69 Eyes, and Apocalyptica. In 2020, Valo embarked on a solo career under the moniker VV. His debut album Neon Noir was released in 2023.

He is also the creator of the heartagram emblem, HIM's trademarked symbol, which has achieved great popularity outside of the band's fanbase. Valo has received several accolades in the music industry and has been regarded as a sex symbol by several publications.

== Early life ==
Ville Hermanni Valo was born in Helsinki, Finland, on 22 November 1976, the son of a Hungarian mother and a Finnish father. His mother Anita worked as a shoe saleswoman and later for the city of Helsinki. His father Kari worked as a taxi driver, before opening a sex shop, where Valo would later work as a teenager. Valo also has a younger brother Jesse, who, like his older brother, embarked on a music career, before turning to professional kickboxing. A few months after Valo was born, the family moved from Vallila to Oulunkylä, where later Valo attended comprehensive school. Valo's earliest musical memories pertain to his father, who would often listen to Finnish folk artists such as Tuomari Nurmio and Tapio Rautavaara while driving his taxi. Valo's mother also recounted how Rauli "Badding" Somerjoki's "Paratiisi" was the only thing that would soothe Valo as an infant. At age eight, Valo bought the album Animalize by Kiss, which sparked his interest in music.

After second grade, Valo was accepted into music-oriented class, where he took up bass guitar, inspired by Gene Simmons of Kiss. During third grade, Valo befriended Mikko "Mige" Paananen, who played bass as well. Around fourth or fifth grade, Valo joined his first band B.L.O.O.D., which played its first and only show in front of Valo's class. Afterwards, Valo joined the Eloveena Boys, who performed a variety of U2 and Dire Straits covers at school dances. Valo also wrote his first song while in the band. During seventh grade, Valo met guitarist Mikko "Linde" Lindström, with whom he joined Aurora, which featured Valo on drums. During lower secondary school, Valo attended the Helsinki Pop & Jazz Conservatory, whilst playing bass and drums in various other bands as well. Afterwards he applied to the music-oriented Sibelius Upper Secondary School, but was rejected. Valo eventually dropped out of school altogether to concentrate on his music career. He was also allowed to skip Finland's national military service due to his asthma.

== Career ==
=== HIM ===
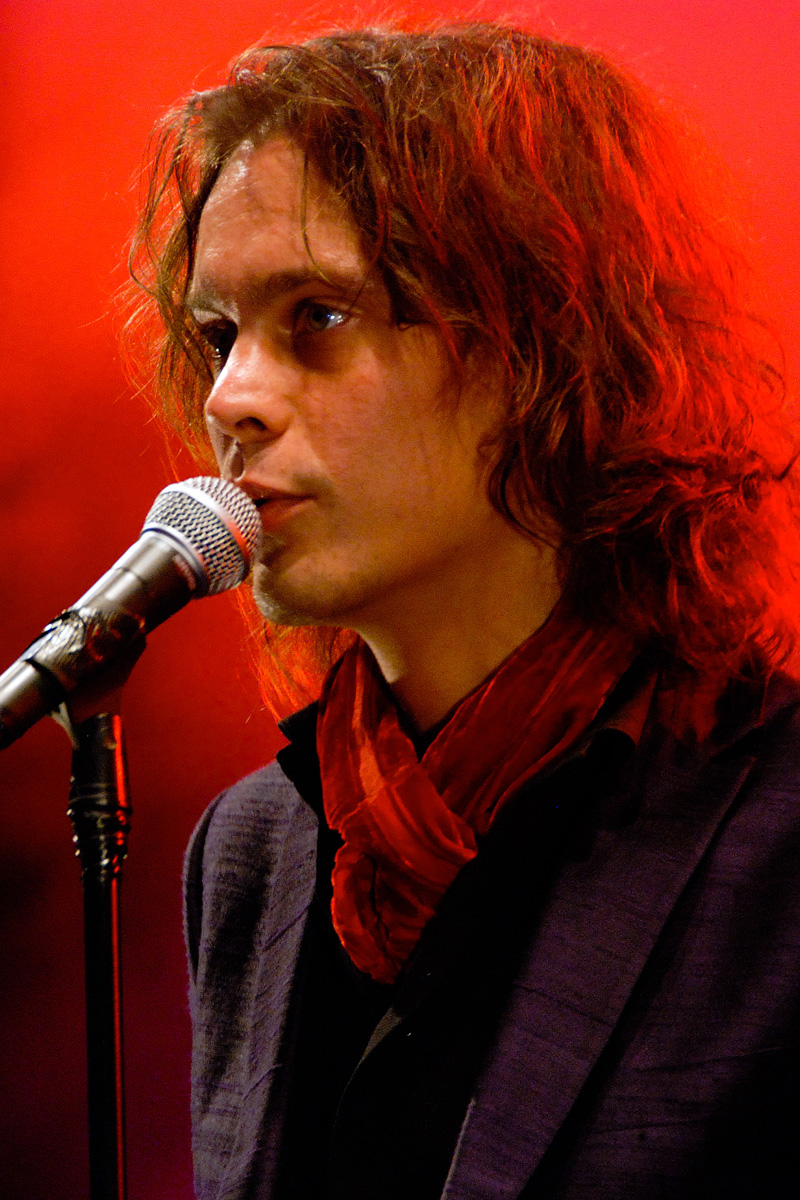
Valo at Ilosaarirock 2007

In 1991, Valo and Mikko "Mige" Paananen formed His Infernal Majesty. However, the band broke up in 1993 when Mige began his national military service. His Infernal Majesty was reformed in 1995 by Valo and Mikko "Linde" Lindstöm. After being rejoined by Mige, as well as adding keyboardist Antto Melasniemi and drummer Juhana "Pätkä" Rantala, His Infernal Majesty, now simply called HIM, released its debut album Greatest Lovesongs Vol. 666 in 1997. In 2000, now with drummer Mika "Gas Lipstick" Karppinen and keyboardist Juska Salminen, HIM released Razorblade Romance, which reached the number one in Finland, Austria and Germany. After replacing Salminen with Janne "Burton" Puurtinen, the band released Deep Shadows and Brilliant Highlights (2001) and Love Metal (2003), which continued to further HIM's success across Europe. The albums also paved the way for HIM's first tours in the United Kingdom and the United States.

In 2005, HIM released Dark Light, which became the group's most commercially successful album to date. It also gave HIM the distinction of being the first Finnish group in history to receive a gold record in the United States. Dark Light was followed up by 2007's Venus Doom. While not as successful as its predecessor, it gave HIM its highest chart position in the United States and garnered the band its first and only Grammy nomination. After 2010's Screamworks: Love in Theory and Practice, HIM entered an extended hiatus after Gas Lipstick was forced to take medical leave. Following several months of uncertainty, the band regrouped and released Tears on Tape in 2013. Gas Lipstick later announced his departure from the band in 2015. He was replaced by Jukka "Kosmo" Kröger. Preliminary work on another album was started, but the band ultimately felt like "there was nothing left to give collectively". On 5 March 2017, HIM announced that the band would be disbanding following a farewell tour. HIM played its final show on New Year's Eve 2017 as a part of its annual Helldone Festival.

=== Collaborations and solo career ===
Over the course of his career, Valo has contributed to numerous releases by other artists, including The 69 Eyes, Anathema, Andy McCoy, Bloodhound Gang, Cradle of Filth, Jeff Walker, Lullacry, MGT, The Mission and Tehosekoitin. Valo was also a member of Daniel Lioneye, a side project formed by Valo and fellow HIM members Linde Lindström and Mige. Valo played drums on the group's 2001 album The King of Rock 'n Roll, and its accompanying tour. In 2014, the band's original line-up reunited at the Helldone Festival.

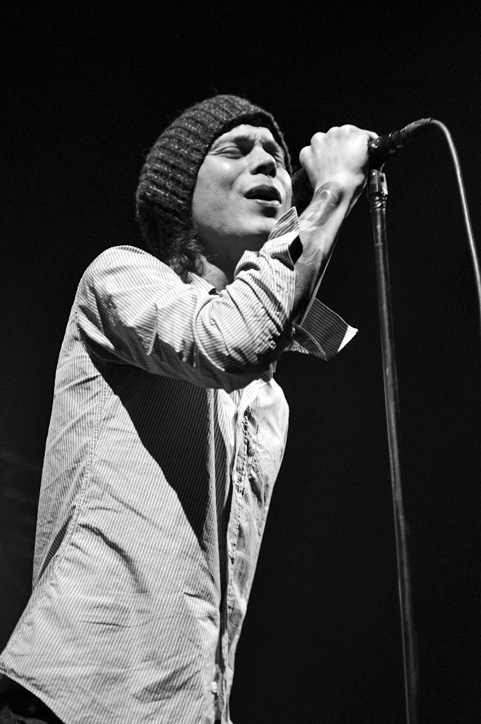
Valo at the 2010 Soundwave Festival

In 1999, Valo appeared as guest vocalist on the television show Laulava sydän, where he performed three songs with Finnish schlager group Agents. In 2004, Apocalyptica released "Bittersweet", which featured guest vocals by Valo and Lauri Ylönen of The Rasmus. The song reached number one in Finland, while also cracking the top ten in Germany and Switzerland. Valo and Ylönen performed the song with Apocalyptica live for the first and only time in January 2005 at the Yhteinen ASIA benefit concert for victims of the 2004 Indian Ocean earthquake and tsunami. In 2006, Valo contributed vocals to the compilation album Synkkien laulujen maa. He performed the tracks "Kun minä kotoani läksin" and "Täällä Pohjantähden alla", the latter of which was a duet with famed Finnish singer Kari Tapio. Valo later described recording the song with Tapio as one of the greatest experiences of his musical career. In 2007, Valo and German actress-singer Natalia Avelon recorded a cover version of Lee Hazlewood's "Summer Wine" for the film Eight Miles High. The song charted at number one in Finland and Greece, as well as number two in Germany and Switzerland. It would later be certified platinum in Finland and Germany.

At 2014 edition of Helldone, Valo made his solo live debut, when he performed a set of songs under the pseudonym Rambo Rimbaud. In 2016, Valo released a cover version of "Olet mun kaikuluotain" (a Finnish version of John Denver's "Annie's Song") to celebrate the 50th anniversary of Love Records. The single reached number one on the Finnish Digital Song Sales Chart. A music video, directed by Ykä Järvinen, was also produced. It would later receive the award for Video of the Year at the 2016 Emma Gala. In 2017, Valo provided the soundtrack for the virtual reality video game Downward Spiral: Prologue by 3rd Eye Studios. He would go on to score the 2018 sequel Downward Spiral: Horus Station as well.

In August 2018, it was announced that Valo would be reuniting with Agents to record songs (including previously unreleased ones) by late Finnish singer-songwriter Rauli "Badding" Somerjoki. Valo described the project as a huge honour, having been a fan of Somerjoki and Agents since childhood. Ville Valo & Agents made their live debut at the 2018 Emma Gala. Their self-titled album was released on 15 February 2019, and it debuted at number one on the Finnish Albums Chart, going gold in less than a week. The group then began a tour of Finland, which concluded in August 2019, a year after the project's initial announcement. According to Valo, the partnership was always intended to remain "short but sweet", thus he and Agents parted ways after the tour. Their collaboration would go on to receive three Emma Award nominations.

On 20 March 2020, Valo released the surprise EP Gothica Fennica Vol. 1, under the moniker VV. Two of its three tracks charted in Finland. In April 2022, Valo released "Loveletting", the first single from his debut solo album Neon Noir, which was released on 13 January 2023. It charted in six countries, debuting at number one in Finland and number four in Germany. It would also go on to win in the rock category at the Emma Awards. In support of the album, Valo embarked on a world tour beginning in January 2023. His backing band consists of lead guitarist Mikko Virta, rhythm guitarist Sampo Sundström, bassist Juho Vehmanen and drummer Risto Rikala. In September, Valo embarked on a North American co-headlining tour with Black Veil Brides. They also collaborated on a cover of "Temple of Love" by The Sisters of Mercy, which was released in June. The Neon Noir supporting tour concluded at London's Royal Albert Hall on 10 May 2024.

=== Other work ===
Valo has made various appearances on television and film. In 1998, he had a small role in the Ilppo Pohjola directed short film Asphalto. In 2008, Valo voiced Moto Moto in the Finnish dub of Madagascar: Escape 2 Africa. Valo has also appeared in several projects by Bam Margera, including Jackass Number Two and Viva La Bam. While he has received offers for several small acting roles, Valo has maintained that he is not an actor, jokingly stating in 2013: "I've always felt that [HIM needs] to sell about 80 million copies more for me to become an actor, a painter, an opera singer or a TV personality."

In 2005, Valo designed a limited line of Coca-Cola Light cans with the proceeds going to the Red Cross. In 2020, Valo was named the new face of Presidentti coffee by Paulig.

== Personal life ==
Valo resides in Helsinki, Finland. In 2006, Valo purchased a 19th-century tower house in Munkkiniemi, where he lived until 2015, when it was put up for sale.

Valo dated Finnish television host and model Jonna Nygrén in the early 2000s. They became engaged in 2005, but separated the following year. They briefly reunited in mid-2006, before breaking up again in 2007. Valo was then involved in a relationship with an undisclosed partner, who served as his main source of inspiration for HIM's 2010 album Screamworks: Love in Theory and Practice. In 2012, Valo was linked to French model Sandra Mittica. They reportedly ended their relationship in 2015. Since 2016, Valo has been in a relationship with Finnish model Christel Karhu. The two made their first public appearance together in February 2017.

Valo has been a vegetarian since he was a teenager. In 2017, he described his diet as "almost vegan".

In 2004, Valo was invited to the Presidential Independence Day reception at Finland's presidential palace, but was unable to attend due to a fever. He attended later in 2006.

=== Substance abuse and legal issues ===
Valo has asserted his disinterest in narcotics, citing cigarettes and alcohol as his only two vices. In 2000, while intoxicated, Valo nearly jumped off the thirteenth floor of a hotel in Germany, before being pulled back by friends. In November 2004, the New York Post ran an article where Valo was accused of performing drunk at HIM's Irving Plaza concert. Valo reportedly threw half empty beer cans across the stage in addition to slurring his words and forgetting the lyrics to songs. In 2005, Valo's drink was spiked in Minneapolis. He suffered minor injuries and was robbed of his jacket, asthma medicine, cigarettes, credit cards, and cell phone. In February 2006, Valo was arrested at his home in Helsinki after allegedly threatening to kill his neighbor and resisting arrest. He later elaborated on the incident, stating: "It was a guy just talking a lot of bull about me and my fiancée. And I got pissed off, I went to his door, I kicked the door, he opened the door and I told him that if he was ever gonna talk badly about me and my girl, he was gonna end up being dead, and I punched him in the face, and that's the whole thing."

During the making of HIM's 2007 album Venus Doom, Valo's alcohol abuse worsened to the point where he was vomiting and defecating blood. He eventually suffered a nervous breakdown. Despite a momentary recovery, Valo began drinking again during the mixing process. Eventually he was admitted to the Promises Rehabilitation Clinic in Malibu by HIM's manager Seppo Vesterinen. Valo later cited depression and stress as contributing factors to his alcohol abuse at the time. On HIM's 2010 album Screamworks: Love in Theory and Practice, Valo worked completely sober for the first time in the band's history. He has since relapsed though he has maintained an effort to balance his drinking. In 2013, Valo stated: "I'm an on and off guy. If I drink, I drink properly for long stretches of time. And if I don't drink, I don't drink at all." In 2017, Valo stated that he consumes alcohol only once a month. By 2023, Valo had quit drinking and smoking. However, he has refrained from calling himself a teetotaler, stating: "I never say never. I have a habit if I forbid something, I want it twice as bad."

== Artistry and influences ==
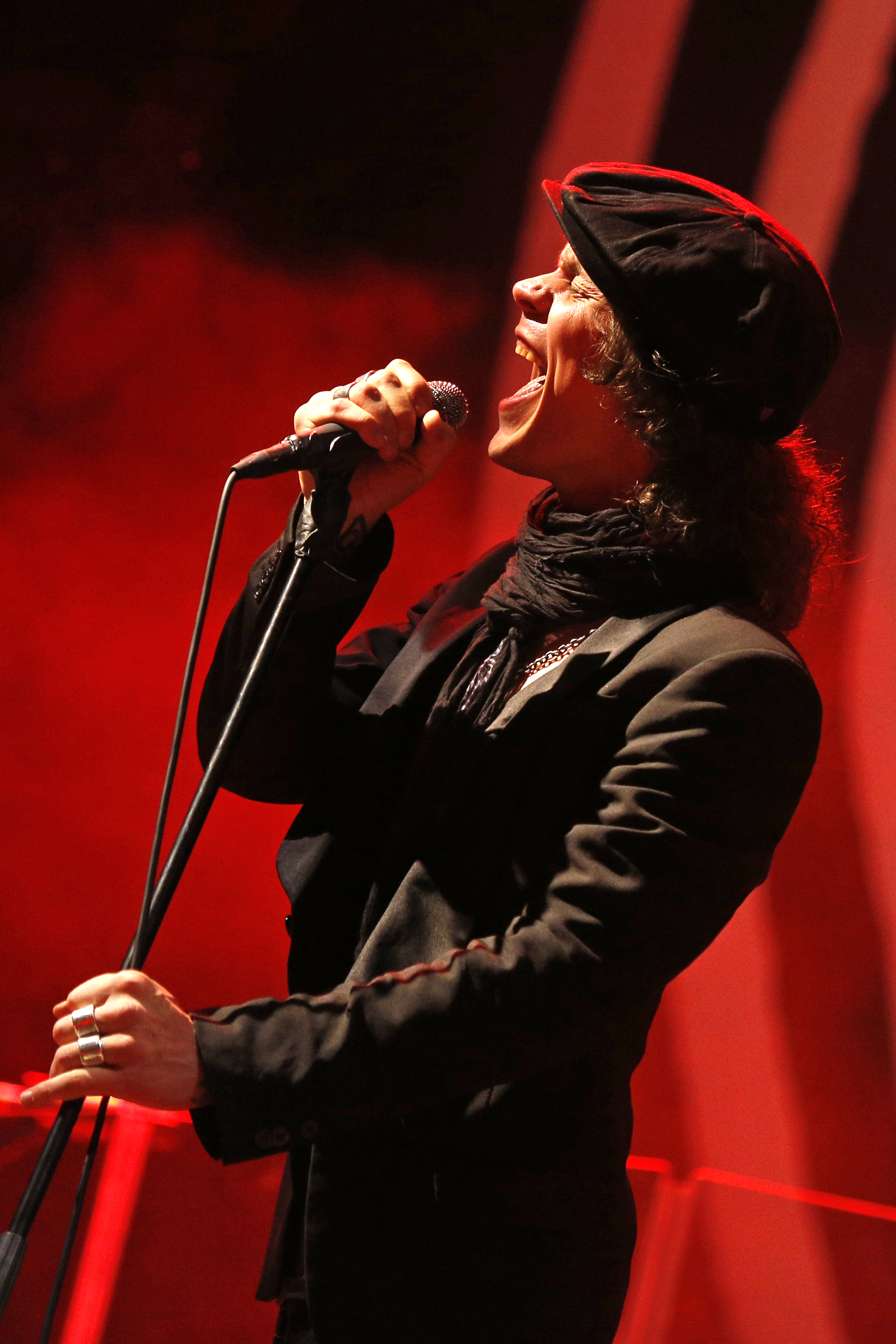
Valo is known for his "slow-paced seductive presence onstage"

As a songwriter, many of Valo's songs tackle themes of love. He has stated: "I feel like there is no subject more important for a song than relationships. It's the only thing that moves me." Valo also takes inspiration from literature, but only certain aspects of it, explaining: "As a guy who writes songs, I get excited about an idea, or a book, or a sentence. I don't necessarily get excited about the whole of Tolkien, I just get excited about Uruk-hai. Just a little detail that just makes my mind work overdrive." Valo's lyrics have been described as "oozing with blood-dripping hearts and gothic melodrama". Valo and the rest of HIM referred to the band's music as "love metal", the idea of which was to combine more melodic and melancholic elements with heavier influences. He has described HIM's music as "sentimental, hard-hitting rock". Valo's musical influences include Black Sabbath, Type O Negative, Neil Young, The Sisters of Mercy, Fields of the Nephilim, Johnny Cash, Depeche Mode, Elvis Presley, Rauli "Badding" Somerjoki, and Tapio Rautavaara. Some of his non-musical influences include Edgar Allan Poe, H.P. Lovecraft, Timo K. Mukka, Charles Baudelaire, Charles Bukowski, Austin Osman Spare, Maya Deren, and Shigeo Fukuda.

Much of HIM's success has been attributed to Valo's songwriting ability, public image, and charisma. In 2006, he was ranked number 80 in Hit Parader's Top 100 Metal Vocalists of All Time. Loudwire ranked Valo as the 14th greatest metal frontman of the 21st century, stating: "His baritone voice is undeniably gorgeous, his vampiric charisma is almost hypnotic, male fans desperately attempt to emulate him and female fans scream ballistically as if he was the second coming of Elvis." Metal Hammer described Valo as one of the early 2000s few new rockstars, stating: "HIM were like no other band. They had a special something, but more importantly they had a special someone. Ville shone like a star with his blend of Mick Jagger posturing and Brandon Lee's dark charms in The Crow." Valo has been voted a sex symbol in polls conducted by Kerrang!, Revolver and MTV3. Regarding these accolades, Valo said: "To be honest, I don't know what a sex symbol is. Compliments are nice, but I've always liked compliments on the music more." When asked if it frustrates him as a songwriter and a musician, Valo stated that ultimately "it doesn't matter". He compared the situation to Kiss, noting how the visuals and music are part of one whole.

On his twentieth birthday, Valo created the heartagram, which would eventually become the symbol for HIM. A combination of a heart and a pentagram, it is meant to represent the juxtaposition of "the soft and the hard, the male and the female, the yin and the yang". Musically, the heart represents the softer side of HIM, while the pentagram conveys the heavier elements of its sound. Valo has called the heartagram his greatest creation. He noted in 2013: "There are a lot of people who have heartagram tattoos now. Kat Von D has one, Steve-O has a dickagram, which is like a heartagram but ends with a dick. It's started to have a life of its own: there are a lot of people who have them who don't actually know what it was, don't relate it to the band, and in that sense, I consider that to be my greatest achievement. So it'll be nice to have it on my tombstone. And it'll be nice to see where it's going to go next." During his solo career, Valo has used a variation of the heartagram with two extra lines forming the moniker VV. Regarding the symbol, Valo jokingly stated: "Artistically speaking the main difference between HIM and VV is the extra line in the heartagram, but what an exquisite line it is!"

== Discography ==
=== HIM ===
- Greatest Lovesongs Vol. 666 (1997)
- Razorblade Romance (2000)
- Deep Shadows and Brilliant Highlights (2001)
- Love Metal (2003)
- Dark Light (2005)
- Venus Doom (2007)
- Screamworks: Love in Theory and Practice (2010)
- Tears on Tape (2013)

=== Daniel Lioneye ===
- The King of Rock 'n Roll (2001)

=== Ville Valo & Agents ===
- Ville Valo & Agents (2019)

=== VV ===
- Neon Noir (2023)

== Awards ==
Metal Hammer Golden Gods Awards

Year	Nominee / work	Award	Result	Ref.
2004	Ville Valo	Golden God Award	Won	
2005	Ville Valo	Icon Award	Won	

BMI Awards

Year	Nominee / work	Award	Result	Ref.
2007	"Wings of a Butterfly"	BMI Pop Award	Won	

Emma Gala

Year	Nominee / work	Award	Result	Ref.
2017	"Olet mun kaikuluotain"	Video of the Year	Won	
2020	Ville Valo & Agents	Band of the Year	Nominated	
2020	Ville Valo & Agents	Iskelmä of the Year	Nominated	
2020	Ville Valo & Agents	Artist / Band of the Year	Nominated	
2024	Neon Noir	Rock of the Year	Won	

Eläköön SuomiRock! Gala

Year	Nominee / work	Award	Result	Ref.
2019	Ville Valo & Agents	Rock Achievement of the Year	Won	
2019	"Ikkunaprinsessa"	Song of the Year	Won	
2020	VV	Artist of the Year	Won	
2020	"Run Away from the Sun"	Song of the Year	Won	
