= Venus Doom =

Studio album by HIM
- Released: 14 September 2007
- Recorded: 2007
- Studio: Finnvox Studios in Helsinki
- Genres: Gothic metal; doom metal; pop metal; hard rock
- Length: 48:12
- Label: Sire
- Producers: HIM; Hiili Hiilesmaa; Tim Palmer

HIM chronology
Uneasy Listening Vol. 2 (2007)	Venus Doom (2007)	Digital Versatile Doom (2008)

Singles from Venus Doom
- 1. "The Kiss of Dawn" Released: 28 July 2007; 2. "Bleed Well" Released: 9 December 2007

Venus Doom is the sixth studio album by Finnish rock band HIM. The album was recorded at Finnvox Studios in Helsinki with producers Hiili Hiilesmaa and Tim Palmer, both whom had collaborated with the band on various occasions, and released on 14 September 2007. During the making of Venus Doom, HIM was struggling with the personal problems of vocalist Ville Valo. In particular, his alcohol abuse had worsened to the point that he suffered health problems and a nervous breakdown during the recording process, after which he entered rehab. Musically the album has been described as HIM's heaviest and darkest album to date, with influences from bands such as My Dying Bride, Anathema and Paradise Lost. Much of the album's lyrical themes and heaviness were inspired by Valo's personal difficulties, including his break-up with fiancé Jonna Nygrén.

Venus Doom received positive reviews from critics, with many commending the album's heaviness and experimentation. The album charted in thirteen countries, including the top ten in four. Venus Doom was eventually certified gold in Finland and gave the band their highest US chart position to date at number twelve, selling over 38,000 copies in the first week. The album also gave the band their first Grammy nomination for "Best Boxed or Special Limited Edition Package". Two singles were released, with "The Kiss of Dawn" reaching number two in Finland. During the summer of 2007, HIM toured across the United States as a part of Linkin Park's Projekt Revolution Tour, as well as opening for Metallica in Europe. HIM began the supporting tour for Venus Doom in the fall of 2007 in North America, followed by the UK, before returning to Europe in early 2008.

== Production ==
In September 2006, HIM cancelled a forthcoming North American tour in support of their previous album Dark Light to begin work on new material. In February 2007, the band entered Finnvox Studios in Helsinki to record their sixth studio album, with producers Hiili Hiilesmaa and Tim Palmer, both of whom had previously worked on the band's 2003 album Love Metal. After three months of recording, the album was mixed at Paramount Studios in Los Angeles by Tim Palmer, and mastered by Ted Jensen at Sterling Sound in New York. For the album's front cover the band used a David Harouni painting that vocalist Ville Valo had purchased while on tour in New Orleans. The painting had been hanging on Valo's living room wall while he was writing material for the album, so he felt it was only natural to use it as the cover art. The title Venus Doom continues the band's tradition of contrasts in album titles, with Venus being the Roman goddess of love, and doom representing Judgement Day and doom metal.

The making of the album was plagued with problems Valo was facing in his personal life. Exhaustion and his break-up with fiancée Jonna Nygrén had severely affected Valo's worsening alcohol abuse, resulting in him reportedly vomiting and defecating blood at one point. All these issues came to a head when Valo suffered a nervous breakdown during the recording process. Valo did manage to recuperate, until the mixing stage, when he began drinking again. Eventually he was admitted to the Promises Rehabilitation Clinic in Malibu by the band's manager Seppo Vesterinen.

== Music and lyrics ==
"Sleepwalking Past Hope" (2007)
"Sleepwalking Past Hope" is HIM's longest song at over 10 minutes in length, and demonstrates the doom metal influenced sound of Venus Doom.

Venus Doom has been described as HIM's heaviest and darkest album to date, and was written with the intent of creating a much heavier and darker follow-up to Dark Light. Valo stated that the band's idea was to combine Loveless by My Bloody Valentine and Master of Puppets by Metallica, and that the album drew on some of the band's early influences, including My Dying Bride, Anathema and Paradise Lost. Valo also described Venus Doom as a more personal album than previous efforts, as well as more "organic" and "violent". Valo also wrote some of the album while in Sirkka, Lapland. Speaking on the sound of the album, BBC described it as a "grand, gothic metal [record] combined with cod-mysticism, crunchy guitars, thrashy drums and a breathy vocal delivery tinged with effects."

Talking about the themes explored on Venus Doom, Valo stated: "Lyrically, it's about me losing a relationship and then actually regaining it, and losing my sanity and regaining it [...] It's like me getting rid of my demons and putting the pain in the music." The title track talks about "how much love has to suffer for our humankind's insanity and our stupidity to get through to our jaded, cold hearts". "Passion's Killing Floor" was included on the soundtrack album of the 2007 film Transformers, while "The Kiss of Dawn" was partly inspired by a friend of Valo's who committed suicide. In "Song or Suicide", Valo used lines from the poems of Finnish author Timo K. Mukka, while the title was inspired by American singer-songwriter Judee Sill. Valo also described the song as being very "positive", and talks about the "feeling that you have enough to do and say, at least for yourself, not to end your days, and not to want to leave this world." The track was also recorded at the Chateau Marmont in Los Angeles. "Sleepwalking Past Hope" is the longest song in HIM's catalogue and was partly inspired by Valo's relationship with Jonna Nygrén. Valo explained, stating: "It's about 'When do you really want to let go?' 'When is the time?', because nobody can tell you the time to let go of a relationship or let go of yourself."

== Release and promotion ==
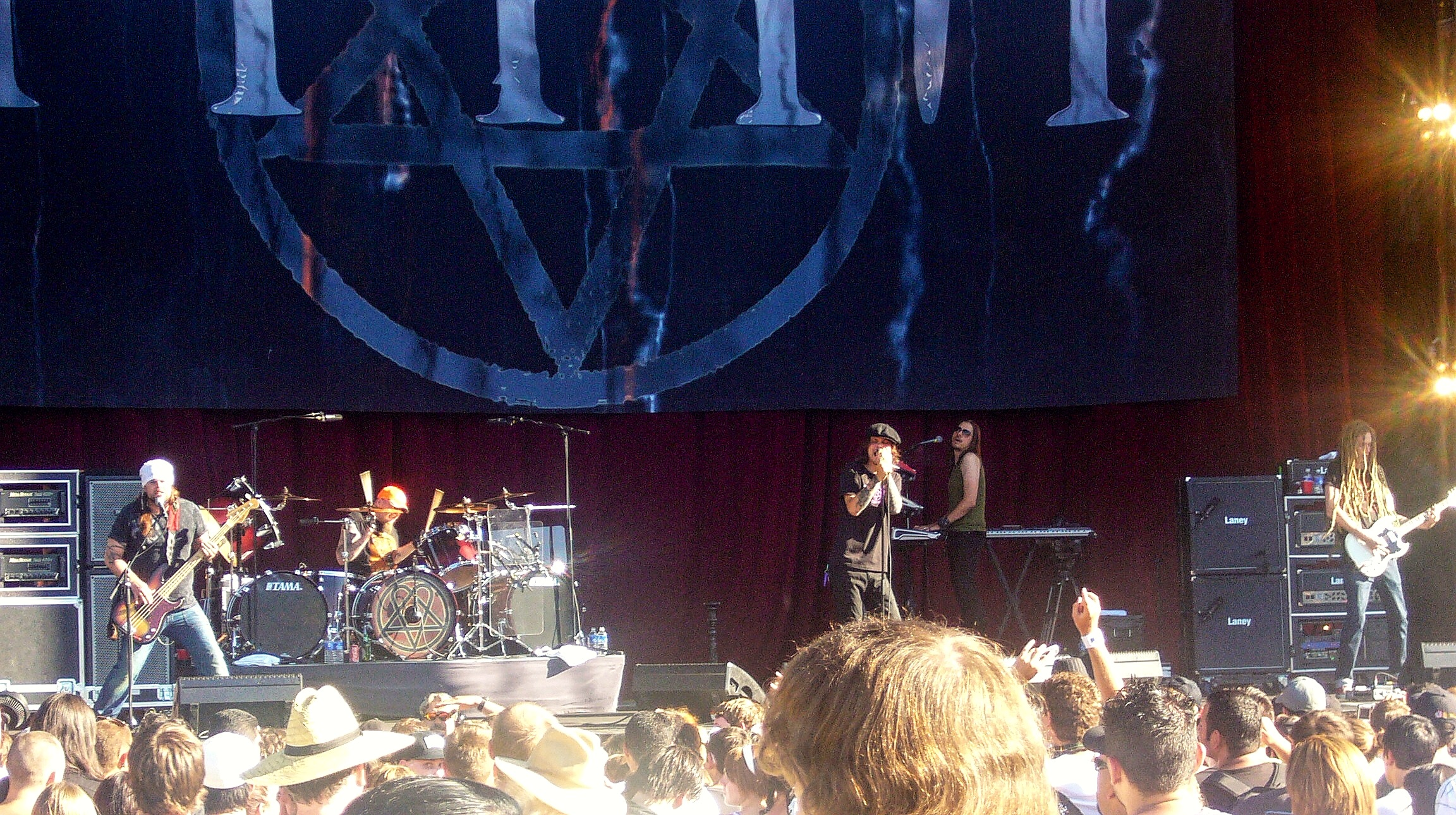
HIM performing in Marysville, California, in August 2007

Venus Doom was originally scheduled to be released on 10 July 2007, but was pushed back to September in May 2007. From 25 July to 3 September 2007, HIM toured the US with Linkin Park on their Projekt Revolution Tour, which also included My Chemical Romance, Taking Back Sunday and Placebo. Prior to the beginning of the tour, HIM also held a contest for fans to win a trip to meet the band at tour's opening date in Seattle. The winners of the contest would also be featured on a forthcoming live DVD. HIM also played a number of concerts in the summer of 2007 opening for Metallica on their Sick of the Studio '07 Tour, including a show at Wembley Stadium in London. "The Kiss of Dawn" was released as the first single from Venus Doom on 28 July 2007, and reached number two in Finland, number 30 in Sweden, number 44 in Germany, and number 59 in the UK. "Bleed Well" followed later that year as the second single from the album. Both also received music videos.

Venus Doom was released on 14 September 2007, and charted in thirteen countries, including at number two in Finland, number three in Germany, number five in Switzerland, and number nine in Austria. The album also gave HIM their highest US chart position to date at number twelve. Venus Doom was eventually certified gold in Finland, and was also nominated for the "Grammy Award for Best Boxed or Special Limited Edition Package", as well as "Rock Album of the Year" at the 2007 Emma Awards. HIM began the North American leg of the supporting tour for Venus Doom on 18 October 2007 in Sayreville, New Jersey, with Bleeding Through serving as support. The band's shows at the Orpheum Theatre in Los Angeles on 14 and 15 November 2007 were also filmed and recorded, and later released as the live album Digital Versatile Doom on 29 April 2008. In December 2007 HIM toured across the UK, before starting a European tour in early 2008.

== Reception ==
Professional ratings
Aggregate scores
Source	Rating
Metacritic	67/100
Review scores
Source	Rating
NOW	5/5 stars
Soundi	4/5 stars
Rumba	4/5 stars
Imperiumi.net	8+/10
Allmusic	3.5/5 stars
NME	Positive
Spin	Positive
BBC	Positive
Helsingin Sanomat	Mixed

Venus Doom received positive reviews from critics, with an average score of 67 out of 100 on Metacritic. NME described it as "an extremely well-executed pop-metal album", while Aaron Burgess of Spin called the album "may be the year's heaviest, creepiest, and sexiest hard-rock group effort". He also commended the rest of the band for being able to stretch out alongside Valo. Sauli Vuoti of Soundi awarded Venus Doom four stars out five and described as "dark, depressing and extremely twisted". He also gave praise to guitarist Mikko "Linde" Lindström's performance, and called "Sleepwalking Past Hope" "melancholic HIM at their best". Vuoti did compare Venus Doom as being less "hit-focused" and "straightforward" than Dark Light, describing the album as more "experimental". Rumba's Janne Flinkkilä also gave the album four out five stars, and while he did comment on the band's intent on repeating themselves, he still touted Venus Doom as HIM's best album, with special praise being given to Valo's vocal performance. Mape Ollila of Imperiumi.net also called Venus Doom the band's heaviest and darkest album yet, awarding the album eight-plus out of ten. He also commended the band's decision not to repeat the formula of Dark Light to gain more success.

NOW also commended the band's choice to experiment, while Rolling Stone stated: "The melodies tend toward the lush, while underneath, Valo's bandmates rock with fury and efficiency, ensuring that all the heartbroken laments are badass enough for hardcore metalheads." AllMusic's Jason Lymangrover gave the album three-and-a-half stars out of five, and described the album as finding the band "back on track and sounding more metal than ever." He did criticize the lyrics, but also stated that "most fans of the band don't want to philosophize, they want to hear the group rock out, and this release shows them doing precisely that, even harder than before." Eamonn Stack of the BBC was also positive in his review of Venus Doom, describing the album as "instantly catchy, heavy and melodramatic, and produced with polish and with some great choruses", but did feel that the material lacked variety. Jarkko Jokelainen of Helsingin Sanomat was more mixed in his review, giving kudos to the Lindström's guitar playing and the arrangements, but overall felt that the album lacked the hit-potential of Dark Light.

Valo later ranked Venus Doom as one of his favorite albums by the band, and in 2017 described it as a "tribute album to the artists, because of whom we formed the band", and as a "look at personal limits through the lenses of Melleri and Mukka. The search for the core of Slavic melancholy." Loudwire later ranked Venus Doom fifth in the band's discography, describing it as "focusing more on chunky, heaving riffs" and displaying "HIM's dynamic interplay between unchained love and heartbreak". Kaaoszine ranked the album as HIM's fourth-best album, calling it "one of the band's strongest albums as a whole". "Sleepwalking Past Hope" was also voted the band's best song by the readers of Metal Hammer in 2017.

== Track listing ==
All Lyrics written by Ville Valo.

No.	Title	Length
1.	"Venus Doom"	5:08
2.	"Love in Cold Blood"	5:55
3.	"Passion's Killing Floor"	5:10
4.	"The Kiss of Dawn"	5:54
5.	"Sleepwalking Past Hope"	10:03
6.	"Dead Lovers' Lane"	4:29
7.	"Song or Suicide"	1:10
8.	"Bleed Well"	4:24
9.	"Cyanide Sun"	5:57
Total length:		48:12

Special edition bonus disc
No.	Title	Length
1.	"Love In Cold Blood" (Special K RMX)	4:25
2.	"Dead Lover's Lane" (Special C^{616} RMX)	4:29
Total length:		57:15

Special limited edition bonus disc
No.	Title	Length
1.	"Love in Cold Blood" (Special K RMX)	4:25
2.	"Dead Lovers' Lane" (Special C^{616} RMX)	4:29
3.	"Bleed Well" (acoustic VRS)	3:53
Total length:		61:08

iTunes bonus tracks
No.	Title	Length
10.	"Killing Loneliness" (live)	4:21
11.	"Wings of a Butterfly" (live)	3:19
Total length:		55:52

Japanese bonus track
No.	Title	Length
1.	"The Kiss of Dawn" (video)	3:55

== Personnel ==
HIM

- Ville Valo − lead vocals, photography, art direction
- Mikko "Linde" Lindström − guitar
- Mikko "Mige" Paananen − bass
- Janne "Burton" Puurtinen − keyboards
- Mika "Gas Lipstick" Karppinen − drums

Production

- Hiili Hiilesmaa – producer, engineer
- Tim Palmer – producer, engineer, mixer, photography
- Arto Tuunela – assistant engineer
- Jamie Seyberth – mixing assistant
- Ted Jensen – mastering
- Michael Goldstone – A&R
- Matt Taylor – art direction, design, photography
- Ville Juurikkala – photography
- David Harouni – artwork

== Charts ==
Chart	Peak position
Australian Albums Chart	32
Austrian Albums Chart	9
Belgium Albums Chart	69
Finnish Albums Chart	2
German Albums Chart	3
Hungarian Albums Chart	21
Italian Albums Chart	20
Dutch Albums Chart	36
Norwegian Albums Chart	22
Spanish Albums Chart	22
Swedish Albums Chart	12
Swiss Albums Chart	5
UK Albums Chart	31
US Alternative Albums	3
US Billboard 200	12
US Hard Rock Albums	1
US Top Rock Albums	3

== Certifications ==
Region	Certification	Certified units/sales
Finland (Musiikkituottajat)	Gold	23,318
Greece (IFPI Greece)	Gold	10,000^{^}
^{^} Shipments figures based on certification alone.
