= Ké =

American singer

- Born: Kevin Grivois; December 5, 1971 (age 54)
- Origin: United States
- Genres: Alternative rock
- Occupation: Singer
- Years active: 1990s
- Labels: RCA; Schizo Music

Kevin Grivois (born December 5, 1971), known professionally as Ké ( /ˈkeɪ/ KAY), is an American singer. He gained recognition with his 1995 debut album, I Am [ ], which spawned the single "Strange World", the biggest pop radio hit in Italy and Germany that year. The following single, "Someday" (1996), and the albums Shiny (1998) and Better Way of Living (2001) were less successful and were followed by a hiatus of Ké's musical career.

== Career ==
Ké's music often reflect his cross-cultural background. Drawing on his distinct falsetto voice, Ké can sometimes leave an androgynous vocal impression. Discovered performing in a North London tube station by Eurythmics founder, Dave Stewart, who asked Ké to perform the closing credits song "Broken Circles" for the movie The Ref starring Kevin Spacey. He is probably best known for his 1995 hit song, anti-war anthem "Strange World". His popularity in Europe as a cult icon was cemented in part by the fact "Strange World", his debut single, topped radio charts in the UK, Italy, and Germany as one of the most requested songs of 1996. Although most of his music was never released in the U.S., a dance remix of the song, by Junior Vasquez, hit No. 1 on the Billboard dance chart. Other singles released by Ké include "Someday" (1996), "You Don't Know Me" (1998), "Sounds of Silence" (1998), and "Believer" (1999). Rebounding on his own with a self-released "Better Way of Living", which featured a duet with Macy Gray. Ké soon thereafter decided to renounce the hollow pursuit of celebrity to devote his time to more substantial animal welfare issues.

== Album discography ==
- I Am [ ] (RCA, 1995)
- Shiny (RCA, 1998)
- Better Way of Living (Schizo Music, 2001)

== Singles discography ==
- "Strange World" (RCA 1995)
- "Someday" (RCA, 1996)
- "You Don't Know Me" (1998)
- "Sounds of Silence" (1998)
- "Believer" (1999)
