= Bang and Whimper 2017 – The Farewell Tour =

2017 concert tour by HIM

- Tour by HIM
- Promotional poster for the North American leg
- Location: Europe; North America
- Start date: 14 June 2017
- End date: 31 December 2017
- Legs: 3
- No. of shows: 51

HIM concert chronology
- Tour of the Middle Aged (2015); Bang and Whimper 2017 – The Farewell Tour (2017)

Bang and Whimper 2017 – The Farewell Tour was a concert tour by the Finnish gothic rock band HIM. Originally formed in 1991, the band announced on 5 March 2017 their plans to disband following a farewell tour that same year. HIM had taken a break during 2016 but began work on new material at the end of the year. According to vocalist Ville Valo, the band felt their new material was lacking, and the band members eventually decided to disband while they were all still on good terms.

The tour began on 14 June 2017 in Barcelona, Spain, and concluded on 31 December 2017 in Helsinki, Finland, as a part of the band's annual Helldone Festival. The tour spanned three legs across Europe and North America. Most shows were sold out and the tour gathered over 110,000 attendees in total. It also attracted mostly positive reviews, with the Nottingham Post noting that HIM "truly went out with a 'bang' ".

For the tour, the band performed material from all of their studio albums. They played their first-ever outdoor show in Helsinki at the Tuska Open Air Metal Festival, breaking the festival's record for highest attendance on a single date. In conjunction with the tour, a special photo exhibition by Ville Juurikkala was held at the Helsinki Art Museum and the Morrison Hotel Gallery in New York. The exhibition, titled HIM: Right Here in My Eyes, featured photos of the band preparing for the tour.

== Background ==
HIM had been on hiatus in 2016, during which time the bandmembers worked on different side projects. They regrouped at the end of the year to start work on new material with drummer Jukka "Kosmo" Kröger, who had replaced Mika "Gas Lipstick" Karppinen in 2015. According to vocalist Ville Valo, "We felt like the new material wasn't taking flight. We got along well together, but something was lacking. The stars weren't in alignment." Valo also said, "We felt like there was nothing left to give collectively. It was fun playing the old songs, everybody got along well together, but that spark was missing."

In February 2017, HIM held a band meeting at a pub near their rehearsal place, where they discussed the future of the group. The band announced their plans to disband on 5 March 2017 via their Facebook page. In the announcement, Valo said:

After quarter of a century [sic] of love and metal intertwined we sincerely feel HIM has run its unnatural course and adieus must be said in order to make way for sights, scents and sounds yet unexplored. We completed the pattern, solved the puzzle and turned the key. Thank you.

In the same post, bassist Mikko "Mige" Paananen added, "At the end of 2017 we will be released into the wild. Before this event of great transformation we would love to offer you one last chance to experience our live performances in His Majesty's service. It shall not be a weepfest but a celebration of love metal in all its lovecraftian glory! See you there!"

Along with the announcement, the band revealed European dates for their farewell tour, with a North American leg being announced later in June. Aside from two festival appearances, no other Finnish dates were revealed. Valo later said "My deep personal wish is, that HIM's last note would be heard on the stage of the Tavastia Club on the first day of next year, but we'll see." In August 2017, it was announced that the band's final show would take place on New Year's Eve at the Tavastia Club as a part of the band's annual Helldone Festival. The show was quickly sold out, so four additional Finnish dates for December were announced, all of which sold out as well. Despite announcing the end of the band, Valo didn't rule out the possibility of reuniting in the future and said, "The good thing about this is that there's no drama [...] So it doesn't hurt the chances."

== Production ==
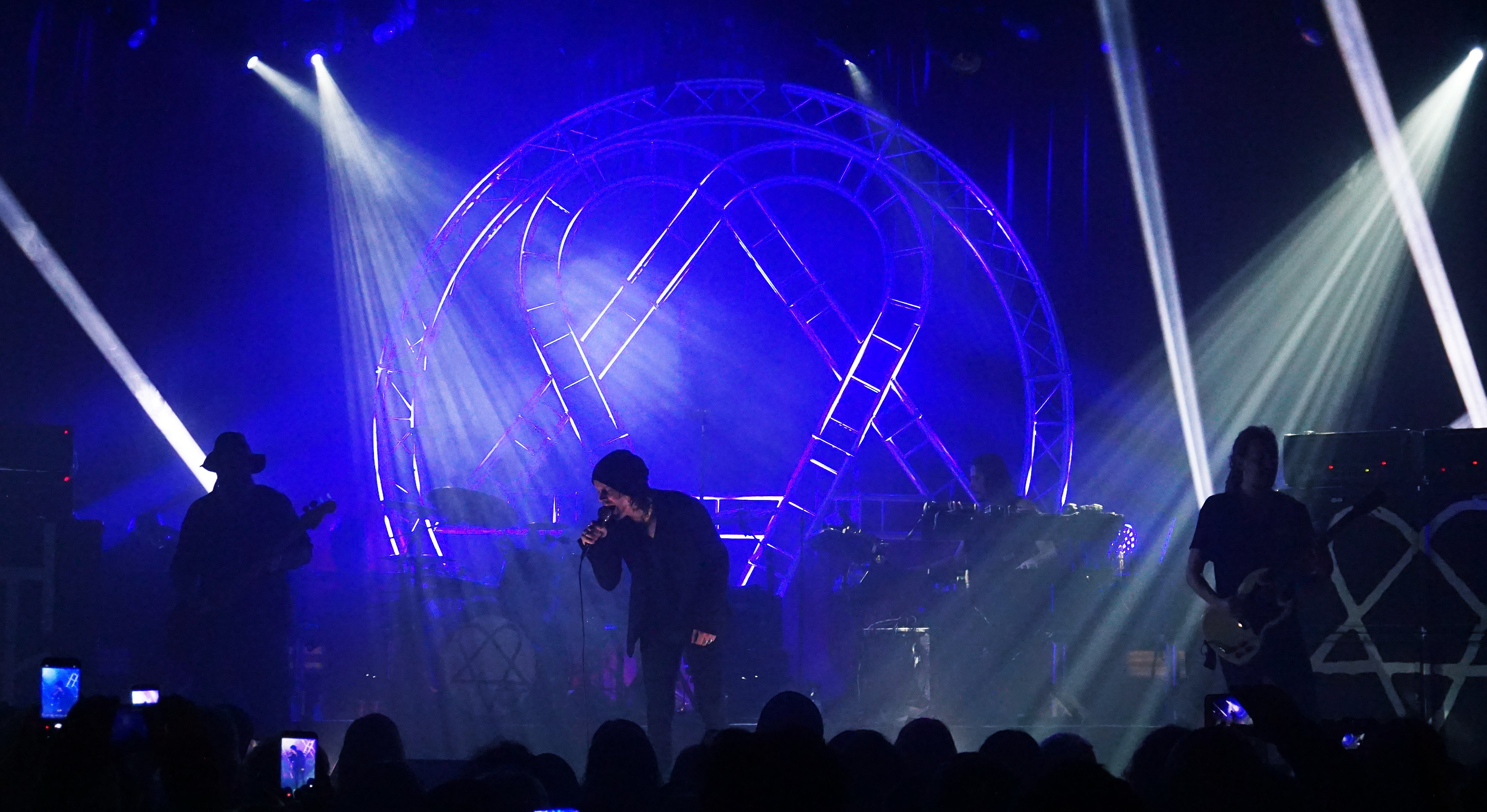
HIM performing in Manchester on 16 December 2017

The tour kicked off on 14 June 2017 in Barcelona, Spain, and continued until 31 December 2017. The tour ran through Europe and North America, including two festival appearances in Finland, where HIM headlined the Tuska Open Air Metal Festival in Helsinki and Miljoona Rock in Tuuri. HIM's appearance at Tuska marked the band's first outdoor show in their hometown of Helsinki, and also broke Tuska's record for highest attendance on a single date, with 14,500 people. Tuska also had its highest attendance ever that year, with 37,000 people. The band's appearance at Miljoona Rock coincided with the 50th birthday of its organizer Vesa Keskinen, with whom the band had made a deal to perform ten years prior.

HIM were joined by opening acts 3Teeth and CKY for the North American leg. The bands Biters and Daxx and Roxane joined HIM on select dates of the second European leg. Jimsonweed performed for the Helldone shows, and The 69 Eyes and Delta Enigma accompanied HIM on select dates.

In conjunction with the band's announcement to retire, a photo exhibition by Ville Juurikkala, titled HIM: Right Here in My Eyes, was held at the Helsinki Art Museum in June 2017, featuring new photographs of the band rehearsing for the farewell tour. In November 2017, the exhibition was held at the Morrison Hotel Gallery in New York City. The same month, HIM appeared on the cover of Metal Hammer and gave an interview about their decision to retire.

=== Set list ===
For the set list, HIM performed songs from all eight of their studio albums as well as their 1996 EP 666 Ways to Love: Prologue. The main set stayed largely the same throughout the tour; "Resurrection" was featured early on, but was eventually dropped from the set. "When Love and Death Embrace" and a cover of Billy Idol's "Rebel Yell" were the major mainstays of the encore, with "Pretending", "Razorblade Kiss" and "Sleepwalking Past Hope" occasionally appearing as well.

Set list from 1 July 2017 at Tuska Open Air Metal Festival in Helsinki, Finland
1. "Buried Alive by Love"
2. "Heartache Every Moment"
3. "Your Sweet Six Six Six"
4. "Resurrection"
5. "The Kiss of Dawn"
6. "The Sacrament"
7. "Tears on Tape"
8. "Wings of a Butterfly"
9. "Stigmata Diaboli"
10. "Gone With the Sin"
11. "Bleed Well"
12. "It’s All Tears (Drown in This Love)"
13. "Wicked Game"
14. "Killing Loneliness"
15. "Poison Girl"
16. "Heartkiller"
17. "Join Me in Death"
18. "In Joy and Sorrow"
19. "Right Here in My Arms"
20. "The Funeral of Hearts"

Encore

21. "Rebel Yell"
22. "When Love and Death Embrace"
Set list from 31 December 2017 at Helldone in Helsinki, Finland
1. "Buried Alive by Love"
2. "Heartache Every Moment"
3. "Your Sweet Six Six Six"
4. "The Kiss of Dawn"
5. "The Sacrament"
6. "Tears on Tape"
7. "Wings of a Butterfly"
8. "Gone With the Sin"
9. "Soul on Fire"
10. "Wicked Game"
11. "Killing Loneliness"
12. "Bleed Well"
13. "Poison Girl"
14. "Heartkiller"
15. "Join Me in Death"
16. "Stigmata Diaboli"
17. "In Joy and Sorrow"
18. "Right Here in My Arms"
19. "The Funeral of Hearts"

Encore

20. "Rebel Yell"
21. "When Love and Death Embrace"

== Reception ==
Most shows on HIM's farewell tour were sold-out, and the tour dates drew a total audience of more than 110,000 people.

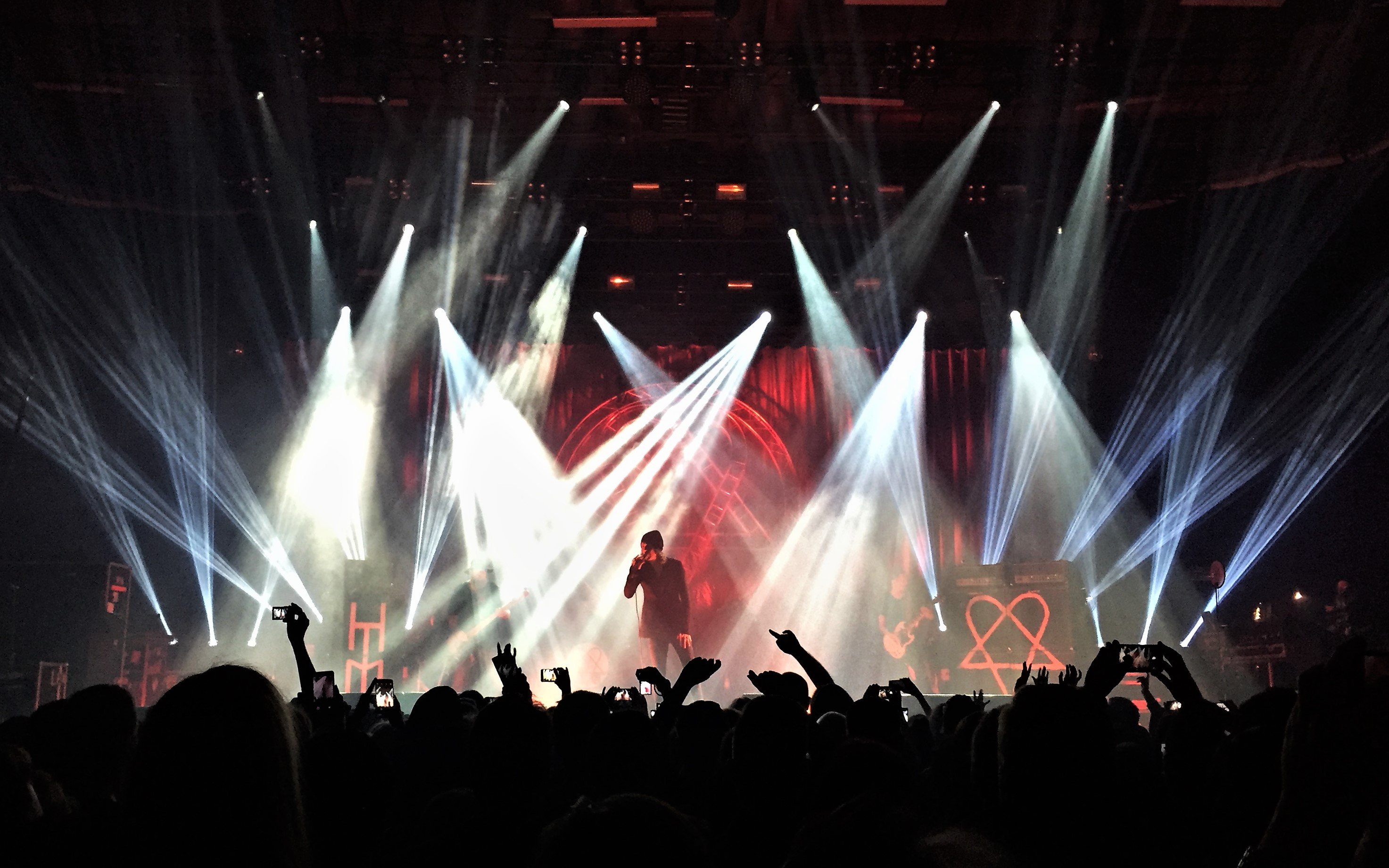
HIM performing at the Helsinki Ice Hall on 27 December 2017

The tour was generally well received by critics. Eve Smallman of the Nottingham Post said that HIM "truly went out with a 'bang'". The overall atmosphere of the shows was described as "celebratory", "exciting", yet "solemn" by Billboard's Katy Kroll. The Guardian's Graeme Virtue concluded his review by stating that "in an era saturated with cash-in reunions it is refreshing to see a band devil-sign off on their own eccentric terms". Pasi Kostiainen of Ilta-Sanomat commented how HIM "never became journeymen, whose only fuel for touring was just nostalgia", noting how their show at the Helsinki Ice Hall featured a band with "more fury and character than most performers ever". Jussi Ahlroth of Helsingin Sanomat touted the band's show at Tuska "meeting all expectations".

Soundi's Henri Eerola praised the band's stage-presence and overall performance at Tuska. He described Valo's performance as "possibly the best the man has ever sounded". Loudwire's Graham Hartmann touted Valo as sounding "perfect the entire night" at the band's show in New York. The rest of the band also received praise, with Millamari Uotila of Etelä-Suomen Sanomat noting how all members got their respective moments to shine, singling out Linde Lindström's solo in "Wicked Game" as a particular highlight.

While the tour was mostly well received, Billboard's Katy Kroll noted technical difficulties hindering the band's show in New York and Nita Makkonen of Ilta-Sanomat gave a less-favorable review for the band's appearance at Miljoona Rock, describing the band's performance as lacking "atmosphere" and Valo as "looking bored". Visa Högmander of MTV Uutiset felt similarly, likening Valo's performance at the Helsinki Ice Hall to a "karaoke night", and stating that "at the Ice Hall we saw a HIM that won't be missed in the slightest". Zach Redrup of Dead Press! gave the band's show in Manchester a mixed review, noting how the band seemed to be "going through the motions", and ultimately called the show "mostly a yawn orgy, and unfortunately a bittersweet farewell."

Ticket sales for the tour's final five dates caused some controversy. Tickets for the Helldone shows were named specific to the buyer, and attendees were required to show matching identification upon entry to the venue. This caused some controversy among concertgoers, because if several tickets had been purchased to a large party and the buyer was unable to attend, the other ticket holders were not allowed entrance to the venue. Ticket offices did not provide the option of changing the name, only allowing resale of the tickets back to the seller. This policy was taken in order to reduce scalping, with organizer Tiina Vuorinen commenting: "HIM has always been surrounded by a ticket-scam-mentality, and that's why this policy has been in effect for years at previous Helldone shows."

== Tour dates ==
List of 2017 concerts, showing date, city, country and venue
Date	City	Country	Venue
14 June 2017	Barcelona	Spain	Razzmatazz
15 June 2017	Madrid	Spain	La Riviera
16 June 2017	Santander	Spain	Sala Escenario
17 June 2017	Porto	Portugal	Hard Club
1 July 2017	Helsinki	Finland	Tuska Open Air Metal Festival
13 July 2017	Tuuri	Finland	Miljoona Rock
23 October 2017	Phoenix	United States	The Van Buren
24 October 2017	Los Angeles	United States	The Wiltern
25 October 2017	Los Angeles	United States	The Wiltern
26 October 2017	Anaheim	United States	House of Blues
28 October 2017	Salt Lake City	United States	The Depot
29 October 2017	Denver	United States	Summit Music Hall
31 October 2017	Mexico City	Mexico	Pepsi Center WTC
2 November 2017	Houston	United States	House of Blues
3 November 2017	Dallas	United States	South Side Ballroom
5 November 2017	Orlando	United States	House of Blues
6 November 2017	Atlanta	United States	Buckhead Theater
7 November 2017	Charlotte	United States	The Fillmore
9 November 2017	Silver Spring	United States	The Fillmore
10 November 2017	Chicago	United States	House of Blues
11 November 2017	Detroit	United States	The Fillmore Detroit
13 November 2017	Toronto	Canada	Rebel
15 November 2017	Philadelphia	United States	The Fillmore
16 November 2017	Worcester	United States	Worcester Palladium
17 November 2017	New York City	United States	Hammerstein Ballroom
24 November 2017	Saint Petersburg	Russia	DK Lensoveta
25 November 2017	Saint Petersburg	Russia	DK Lensoveta
26 November 2017	Moscow	Russia	Club Stadium Live
28 November 2017	Warsaw	Poland	Stodola
29 November 2017	Hamburg	Germany	Docks
30 November 2017	Hamburg	Germany	Docks
1 December 2017	Berlin	Germany	Columbiahalle
2 December 2017	Prague	Czech Republic	Forum Karlin
4 December 2017	Leipzig	Germany	Haus Auensee
5 December 2017	Munich	Germany	Tonhalle
6 December 2017	Zürich	Switzerland	X-TRA
7 December 2017	Milan	Italy	Alcatraz
8 December 2017	Cologne	Germany	Palladium
10 December 2017	Esch-sur-Alzette	Luxembourg	Rockhal
11 December 2017	Amsterdam	Netherlands	Paradiso
12 December 2017	Tilburg	Netherlands	013
14 December 2017	Glasgow	Scotland	Barrowland Ballroom
15 December 2017	Nottingham	England	Rock City
16 December 2017	Manchester	England	Manchester Academy
17 December 2017	London	England	Roundhouse
19 December 2017	London	England	Roundhouse
27 December 2017	Helsinki	Finland	Helldone (Helsinki Ice Hall)^{[a]}
28 December 2017	Oulu	Finland	Helldone (Terminaali Arena)
29 December 2017	Seinäjoki	Finland	Helldone (Rytmikorjaamo)
30 December 2017	Tampere	Finland	Helldone (Pakkahuone and Klubi)
31 December 2017	Helsinki	Finland	Helldone (Tavastia Club)

Notes

^{^{^[a]}} In a smaller "Black Box" capacity

== Personnel ==
HIM

- Ville Valo – lead vocals
- Mikko "Linde" Lindström – guitar
- Mikko "Mige" Paananen – bass
- Janne "Burton" Puurtinen – keyboards
- Jukka "Kosmo" Kröger – drums
