= Mige (musician) =

Finnish bassist

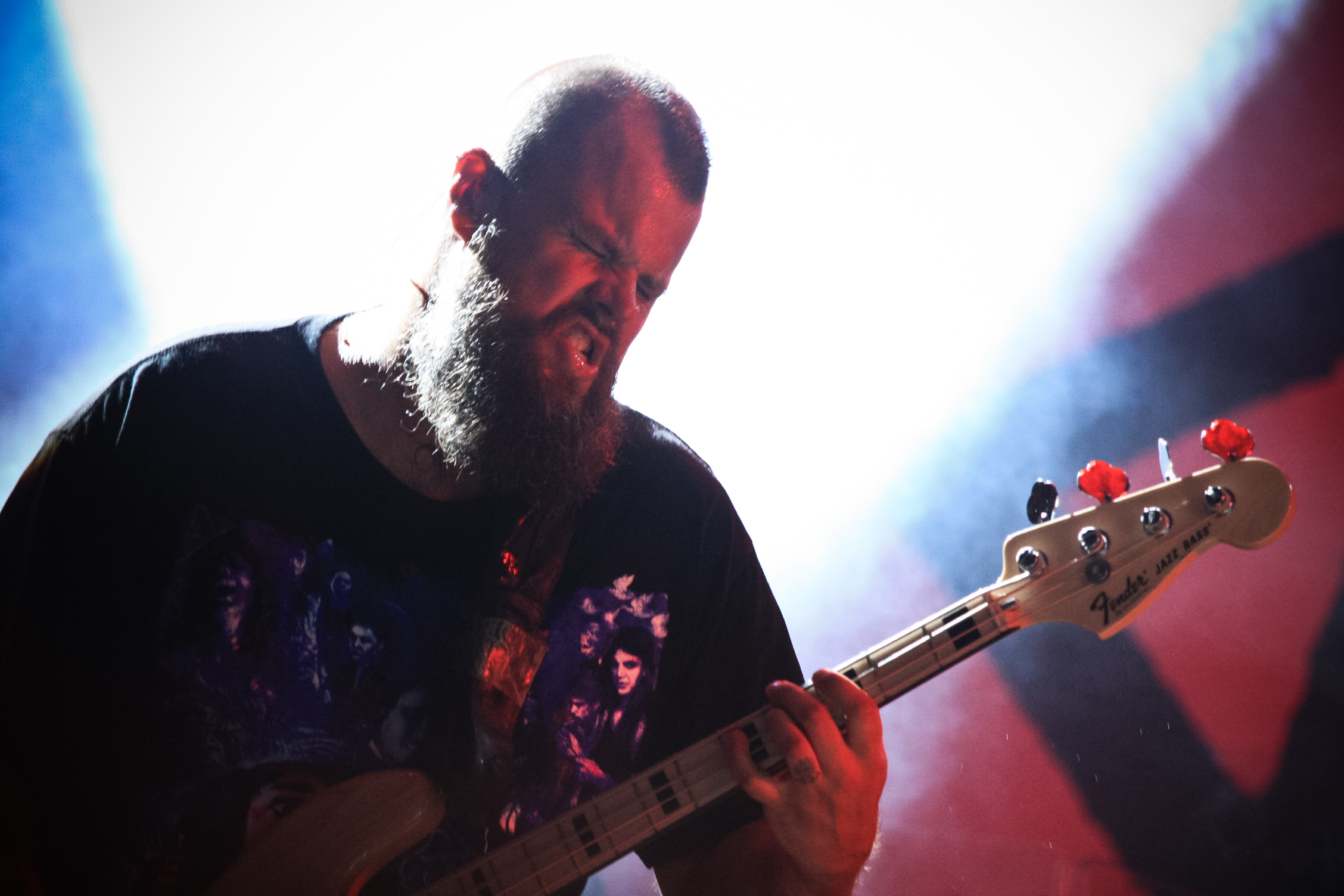
- Mige performing at Qstock 2013

Background information
- Birth name: Mikko Henrik Julius Paananen
- Also known as: Migé Amour, Michael Eros, MZ
- Born: 19 December 1974 (age 50); Helsinki, Finland
- Occupation: Musician
- Instrument: Bass guitar
- Website: heartagram.com

Mikko Henrik Julius Paananen (born 19 December 1974), better known as Mige, is a Finnish musician, best known as the bassist and founding member of the gothic rock band HIM. Born to an artistic family, Mige attended the Sibelius Upper Secondary School of music and dance, when he first formed HIM with Ville Valo. The band broke up after Mige began his national military service, but they reformed in 1995. HIM would go on to release eight studio albums and become one of the most commercially successful Finnish bands of all time. The band announced their retirement in March 2017, and played their final show on New Year's Eve 2017.

Aside from HIM, Mige has performed several times with Daniel Lioneye, the side-project of HIM guitarist Linde Lindström. In 2010, Mige released a solo album, titled Cimmerica, under the pseudonym MZ.

== Early life ==
Mikko "Mige" Paananen was born on 19 December 1974 in Helsinki. His father was an oboist for the Helsinki Philharmonic Orchestra, while his mother worked as a freelance actor. Mige also has an older brother, nicknamed "Helmut". The Paananen family lived in Oulunkylä, where Mige went to school and met future bandmate Ville Valo. Mige's parents divorced when he was thirteen, and he moved to Tuusula with his mother. While attending the Sibelius Upper Secondary School, Mige moved to Kallio for a year to live with a friend. He then moved to Vallila, where he lived alone for some time, before moving back to live with his mother in Tuusula.

Mige began playing drums at age ten, before switching to guitar and eventually bass. He eventually graduated from the Sibelius Upper Secondary School of music and dance. Mige's parents initially discouraged their son's interest to pursue a musical career, but eventually warmed-up to the idea. Mige also attend gardening school and for a while worked as a gardener for the city of Helsinki.

== Career ==
=== HIM ===
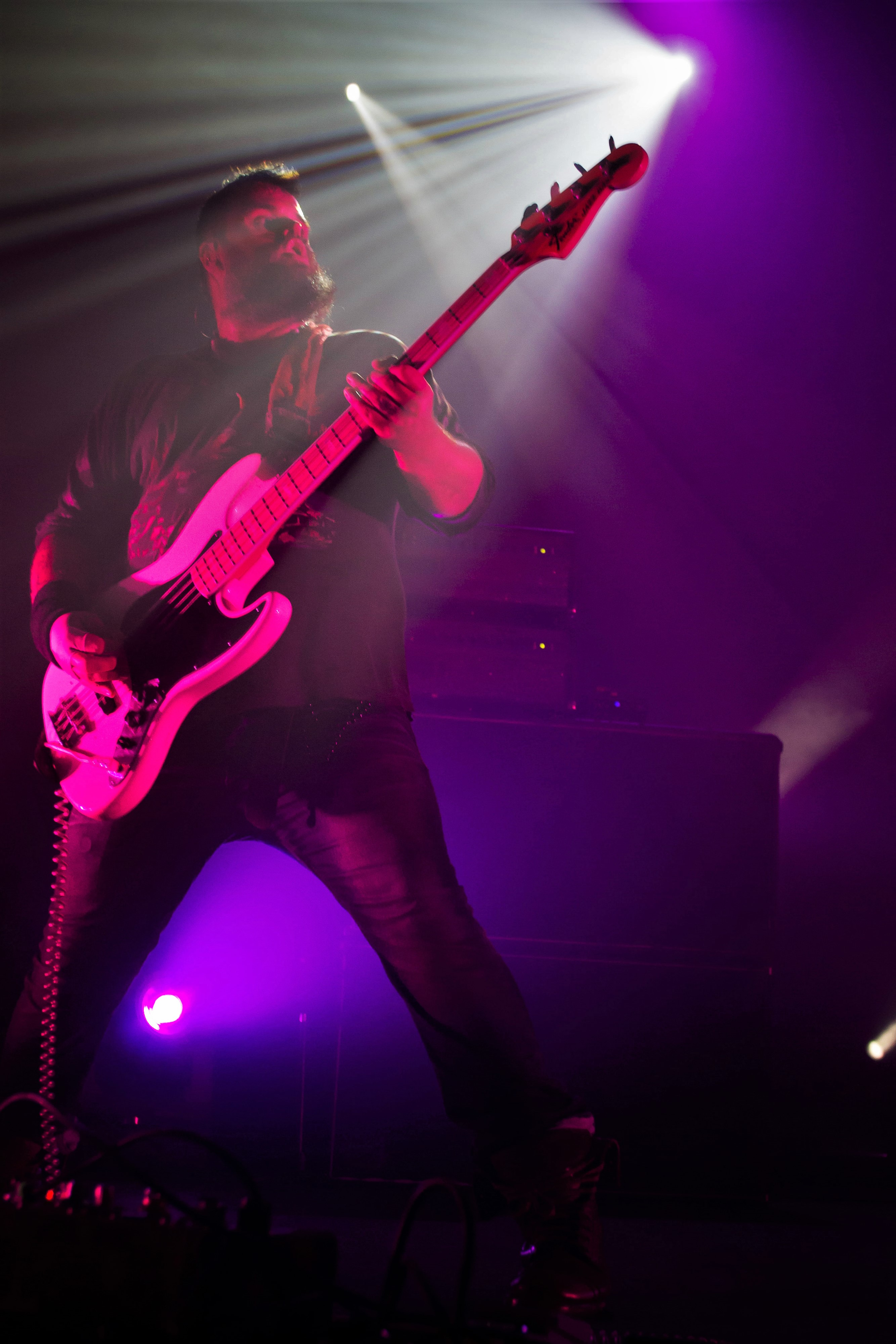
Mige performing with HIM in São Paulo, Brazil, in March 2014

In 1991, Ville Valo and Mige formed His Infernal Majesty. The band broke-up however, when Mige began his national military service in 1993. His Infernal Majesty was later reformed in 1995, by Valo and guitarist Mikko "Linde" Lindström, who were soon rejoined by Mige. After the additions of keyboardist Antto Melasniemi and drummer Juhana "Pätkä" Rantala, the band, now called HIM, released their debut album Greatest Love Songs Vol. 666 in 1997. In 2000, now with drummer Gas Lipstick and keyboardist Juska Salminen, HIM released Razorblade Romance, which reached number 1 in Finland, Austria and Germany. Its first single, "Join Me in Death", also charted at number 1 in Finland and Germany, eventually going platinum in the former. Following the addition of Janne "Burton" Puurtinen on keyboards, the band released Deep Shadows and Brilliant Highlights and Love Metal in 2001 and 2003, respectively. Both cracked the top ten in several countries, and became the band's first albums to chart in the United Kingdom and the United States.

After relocating to the US, HIM released Dark Light in 2005, which became the group's most successful album to date, going gold in Germany, the UK, the US, and platinum in Finland. In 2007, HIM released Venus Doom, which went gold in Finland and Germany, and gave the band their highest US-chart position at number 12. After 2010's Screamworks: Love in Theory and Practice, the band went on hiatus after drummer Gas Lipstick was diagnosed with a repetitive stress injury and nerve damage in his hands. After eight months of uncertainty, the band regrouped and eventually released the album Tears on Tape in 2013. In 2015, Gas Lipstick announced his departure from HIM after 16 years, to pursue other musical projects. He was subsequently replaced by Jukka "Kosmo" Kröger. On 5 March 2017, HIM announced the end of the band following a farewell tour in 2017. The band played their final show on New Year's Eve 2017 as a part of their annual Helldone Festival.

=== Other musical work ===
In 2001, Mige played bass on the album The King of Rock 'n Roll by Daniel Lioneye, which also included Linde Lindström on guitar and vocals, and Ville Valo on drums. The band had played a handful of shows prior, and embarked on a three-date festival tour across Finland after the album's release. In 2010, Mige, under the pseudonym MZ, released the album Cimmerica, which was mixed by Ville Valo. In February 2011, Daniel Lioneye toured the US in support of Cradle of Filth, with the line-up of Mige, Lindström, Burton on keyboards, Seppo Tarvainen on drums, and Manu Patel on backing vocals.

On 30 December 2014, the original line-up of Daniel Lioneye reunited for a performance at HIM's annual New Year's Eve festival Helldone. On 29 June 2016, it was announced that Daniel Lioneye would release its third album Vol. III on 19 August 2016, with Lindström on guitar and vocals, Mige on bass, Burton on keyboards and Seppo Tarvainen on drums. The band also announced five tour dates across Finland for September 2016. Daniel Lioneye was also scheduled to perform several European shows later in the fall, but the dates were cancelled after Tarvainen suffered a broken arm.

== Equipment ==
Mige currently uses Fender Jazz Basses. He previously used a Fender Precision Bass, as well as a Gibson Thunderbird, as seen in the music video for "Join Me in Death" among others. Mige uses a Fender Super Bassman amp head, as well as a Dunlop 105Q Bass Wah and a Death by Audio Soundwave Breakdown fuzz pedal. He previously used a Mesa Boogie Bass 400+ amplifier.

== Discography ==
=== HIM ===
- Greatest Lovesongs Vol. 666 (1997)
- Razorblade Romance (2000)
- Deep Shadows and Brilliant Highlights (2001)
- Love Metal (2003)
- Dark Light (2005)
- Venus Doom (2007)
- Screamworks: Love in Theory and Practice (2010)
- Tears on Tape (2013)

=== Daniel Lioneye ===
- The King of Rock 'n Roll (2001)
- Vol. III (2016)

=== MZ ===
- Cimmerica (2010)
