= Linde Lindström =

Finnish musician (born 1976)

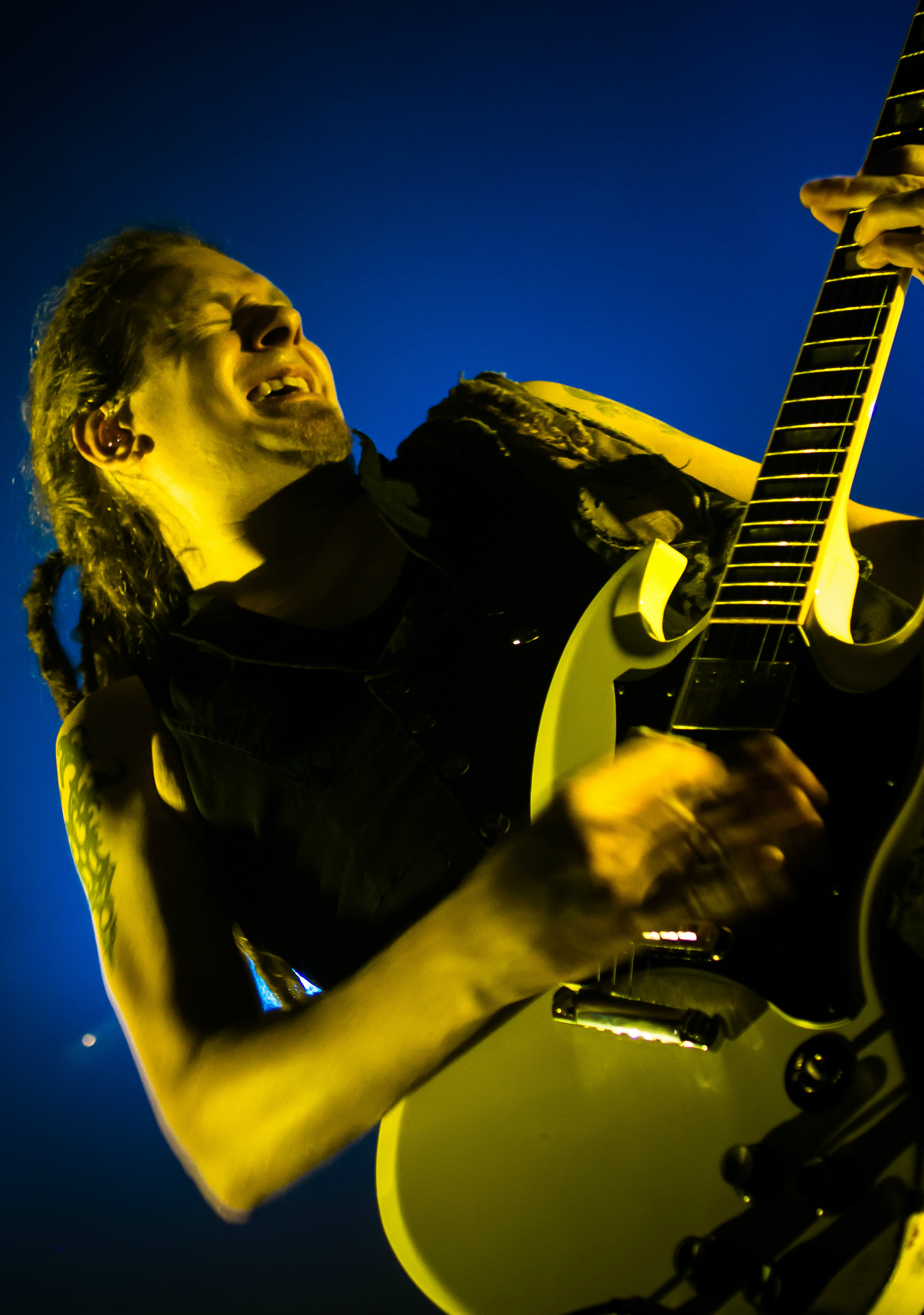
- Lindström performing in 2014

Background information
- Also known as: Daniel Lioneye, Linde, Lily Lazer
- Born: Mikko Viljami Lindström; 12 August 1976 (age 50); Klaukkala, Finland
- Occupations: Musician; songwriter
- Instruments: Guitar; bass
- Years active: 1995–present
- Member of: Flat Earth; Daniel Lioneye
- Formerly of: HIM

Mikko Viljami "Linde" Lindström (born 12 August 1976) is a Finnish musician, best known as the guitarist for the gothic rock band HIM. Influenced by the likes of Black Sabbath and Steve Vai, Lindström began playing guitar at age ten, joining the band Aurora in his teenage years, where he met Ville Valo. In 1995, the two reformed Valo's previous band HIM, which would go on to release eight studio albums and become one of the most commercially successful Finnish bands of all time, and the first to receive a gold record in the United States. In 2017, the band announced their plans to retire following a farewell tour, and played their final show on New Year's Eve 2017.

Aside from HIM, Lindström has released three albums with his own band Daniel Lioneye, which he formed in 2001 with Valo and bassist Mikko "Mige" Paananen. In 2018, Lindström reunited with HIM's former drummer Gas Lipstick to form the band Flat Earth, along with Anthony Pikkarainen and Niclas Etelävuori. Lindström has also collaborated with various other artists during his career, including Jeffrey Walker and the supergroup WhoCares.

== Early life ==
Mikko Viljami Lindström was born on 12 August 1976 in Klaukkala. His father was an engineer while his mother worked for Finnair. Lindström also has a younger brother who was born in 1980. Lindström first became interested in music as a child from hearing cassettes of Elvis Presley in his father's car. At age 10, Lindström received a Landola acoustic guitar for Christmas, and immediately began taking lessons. The first thing he learned was the opening riff of "Heaven's on Fire" by Kiss. Some of Lindström's early influences also included Steve Vai, Jimi Hendrix, Black Sabbath and Led Zeppelin.

Lindström met future HIM-bandmate Ville Valo in seventh grade at the Oulunkylä comprehensive school. The two later began playing together in a band called Aurora. At age 15, Lindström also attended the Berklee College of Music in Boston for two months. As a teenager, Lindström was also arrested twice. The first arrest came when Lindström and a group of friends were charged with theft and breaking-and-entering for breaking the windows of a rehabilitation center for war veterans, and sneaking in to swim in the establishment's pool. The second arrest came, when, at age 15, Lindström was caught driving under the influence. Lindström applied to the Sibelius Upper Secondary School of music and dance, but was rejected, and began attending Käpylä night school, from where he eventually graduated. Lindström was permitted not to perform Finland's national military service, as he was deemed "insane, incapable for warfare."

== Career ==
=== HIM ===
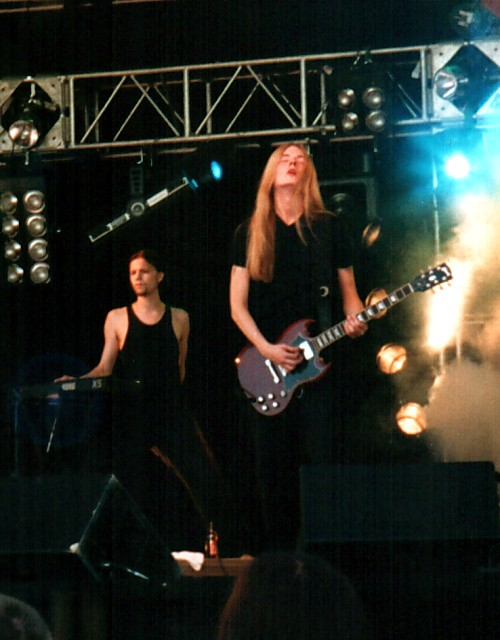
Linde Lindström (right) performing with HIM at Provinssirock 1999

HIM was first formed in 1991 by Ville Valo and bassist Mikko "Mige" Paananen, under the name His Infernal Majesty. The band broke-up in 1993, but was reformed in 1995, by Valo and Lindström. Later rejoined by Mige, as well as keyboardist Antto Melasniemi and drummer Juhana "Pätkä" Rantala, the band, now called HIM, released their debut album Greatest Lovesongs Vol. 666 in 1997. In 2000, now with drummer Gas Lipstick and keyboardist Juska Salminen, HIM released Razorblade Romance, which reached number 1 in Finland, Austria and Germany. Its first single, "Join Me in Death", also charted at number one in Finland and Germany, eventually going platinum in their home country, and gold in Germany and Austria. Following the addition of Janne "Burton" Puurtinen on keyboards, HIM released Deep Shadows and Brilliant Highlights and Love Metal in 2001 and 2003, respectively. Both cracked the top ten in several countries, and became the band's first albums to chart in the United Kingdom and the United States.

After relocating to the US, HIM released Dark Light in 2005, which became the group's most successful album to date, going gold in Germany, the UK, the US, and platinum in Finland. In 2007, HIM released Venus Doom, which went gold in Finland and Germany, and gave the band their highest US chart position at number 12. After 2010's Screamworks: Love in Theory and Practice, HIM went on hiatus after drummer Gas Lipstick was diagnosed with a repetitive stress injury and nerve damage in his hands. After eight months of uncertainty, the band regrouped and eventually released the album Tears on Tape in 2013. In 2015, Gas Lipstick announced his departure from HIM after 16 years, to pursue other musical projects. He was subsequently replaced by Jukka "Kosmo" Kröger. On 5 March 2017, HIM announced the end of the band following a farewell tour in 2017. The band played their final show on New Year's Eve 2017 as a part of their annual Helldone Festival.

=== Daniel Lioneye ===
In 2001, Lindström, along with Mige and Ville Valo, released the album The King of Rock 'n Roll, under the name Daniel Lioneye, which featured Lindström on guitar and vocals, Valo on drums and Mige on bass. Prior to the album's release, the group had only played a handful of shows at various parties around Finland. In 2010, Daniel Lioneye reformed and released the album Vol. II, with Lindström on guitar, bass and vocals, Burton on keyboards, and Black Vomit Bolton on drums. In 2011, the band toured the US for the first time, in support of Cradle of Filth. The band's touring line-up consisted of Lindström, Mige, Burton, Seppo Tarvainen on drums, and Manu Patel on backing vocals.

On 30 December 2014, the original line-up of Daniel Lioneye reunited for a performance at HIM's annual New Year's Eve festival Helldone. On 29 June 2016, it was announced that Daniel Lioneye would release its third album Vol. III on 19 August 2016, with Lindström on guitar and vocals, Mige on bass, Burton on keyboards and Seppo Tarvainen on drums. The band also announced five Finnish tour dates for September 2016. On 30 June 2016, Daniel Lioneye released the official track-listing for Vol. III, as well as its first single "Ravensong". Daniel Lioneye was also scheduled to perform several European shows later in the fall of 2016, but the dates were cancelled, after drummer Seppo Tarvainen suffered a broken arm.

=== Other work ===
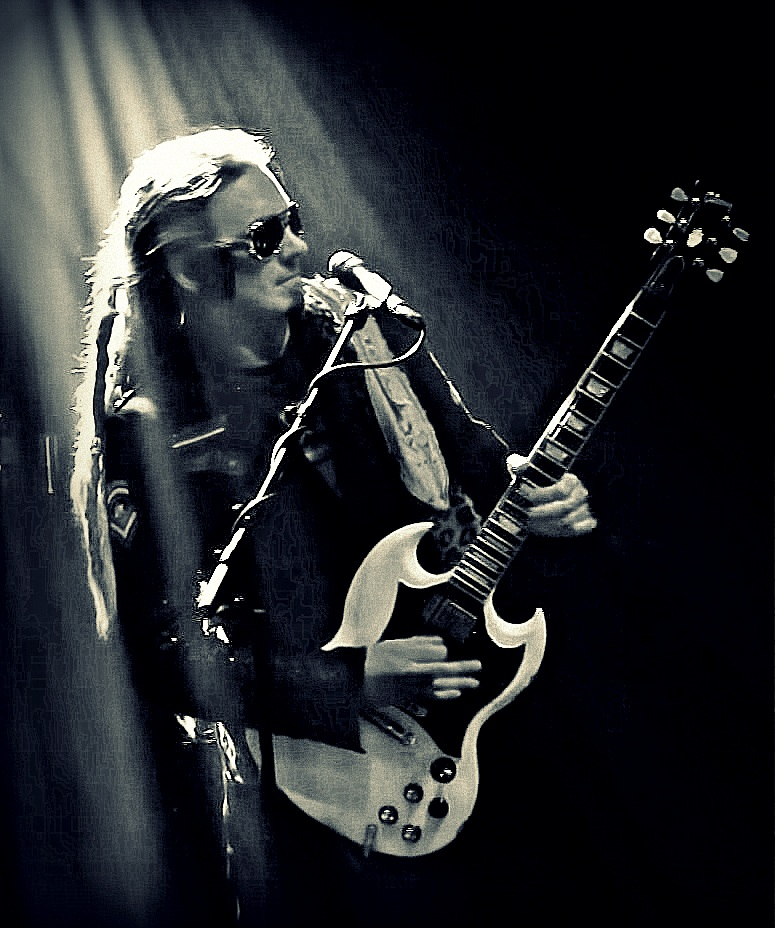
Lindström in 2014

In 2004, Lindström played guitar on the track "Loiste" on Ihmepoika's self-titled debut album, and in 2006, he played on Welcome to Carcass Cuntry by Jeff Walker und Die Fluffers. In 2007, Lindström wrote and recorded several songs on Manna's debut album Sister. In 2011, Lindström took part in the WhoCares supergroup, with Ian Gillan, Tony Iommi, Jason Newsted, Jon Lord and Nicko McBrain. The group recorded the double single "Out of My Mind / Holy Water", with the intent to support the rebuilding of a music school in Gyumri, Armenia, which was destroyed in a 1988 earthquake.

In February 2018, it was announced that Lindström had reunited with former HIM drummer Gas Lipstick to form Flat Earth, along with Polanski vocalist Anttoni "Anthony" Pikkarainen and bassist Niclas Etelävuori, formerly of Amorphis. It was also announced that the band were in the process of recording their debut album with producer Hiili Hiilesmaa, which would be partly financed through an online crowdfunding campaign. The group's first single "Blame" was released on 30 April 2018, with the official music video premiering the following May. The band's second single "Cyanide" was released on 21 September. The band also opened two shows for Kamelot that same month in Finland. On 26 October, the band released their third single "Given Time". Flat Earth released their debut album None for One on 9 November 2018, through Drakkar Entertainment in Europe and the band's own label Suur Etikett in Finland. The band then embarked on a tour across Finland. In September 2019, the band announced they were working on their second album.

In 2020 and 2021, Lindström played several shows across Finland with Michael Monroe and Sami Yaffa, both formerly of Hanoi Rocks. He also made an appearance in the music video for Sami Yaffa's solo single "The Last Time".

== Personal life ==
Lindström currently resides in the countryside outside of Helsinki, with his dog and three cats. In the 1990s, Lindström dated Finnish-English singer Sanna-June Hyde, who sang on HIM's cover of "(Don't Fear) The Reaper" by Blue Öyster Cult. On 12 March 2003, Lindström's then-girlfriend, Finnish-Algerian singer Mariam "Manna" Jäntti, gave birth to their first child, a daughter named Olivia. Lindström and Manna later married, but divorced, and in 2010 Lindström became engaged to Toni-Marie Iommi, the daughter of Black Sabbath guitarist Tony Iommi. In 2013, the couple were reported to have broken-up.

== Equipment ==
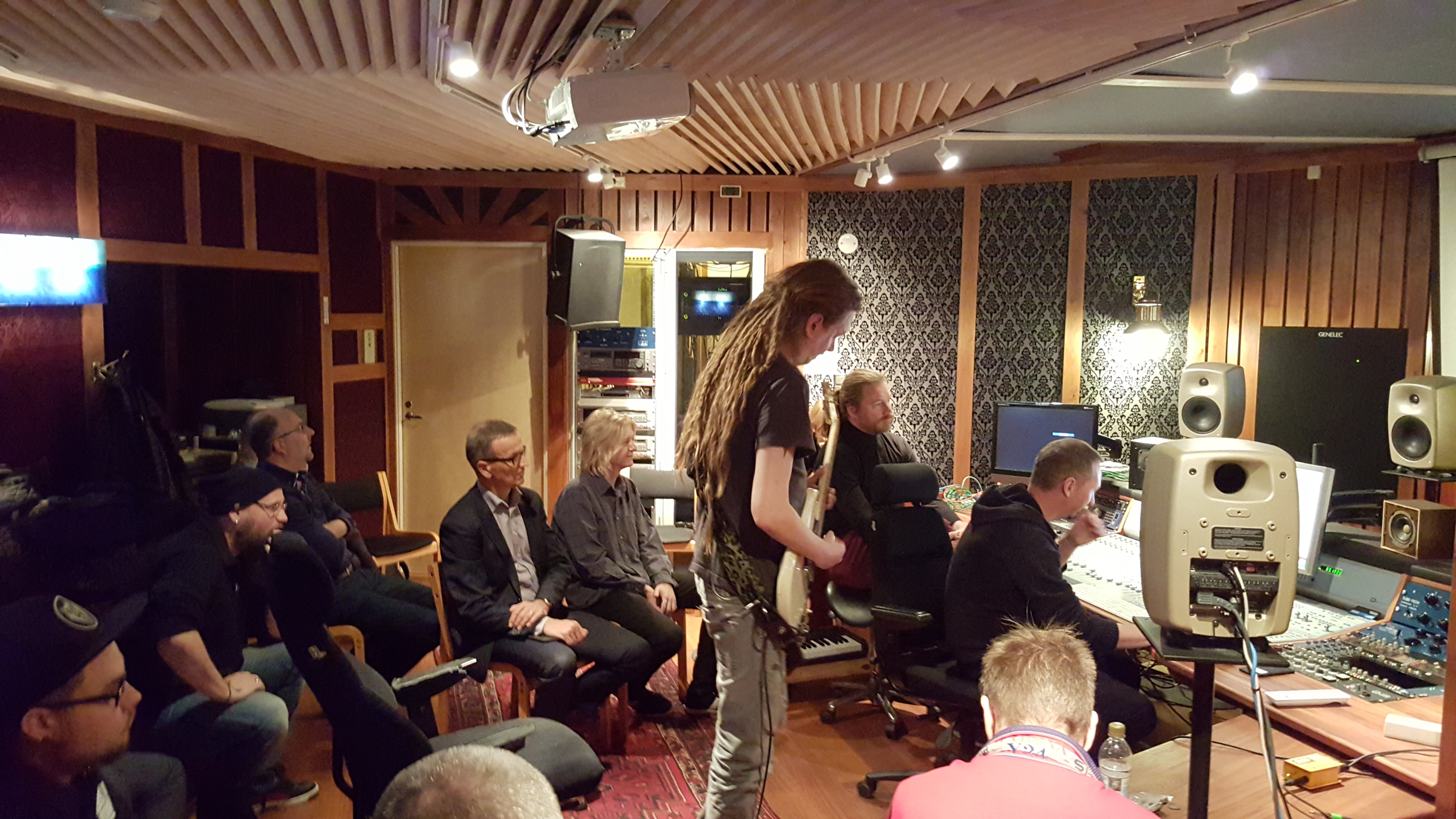
Lindström giving a guitar recording master class in October 2015

Lindström has used Gibson SGs most of his career. He currently uses only one SG live. His SG was first fitted with Gibson 490T pickups,, but these were replaced with a more powerful 500T (bridge position) and a Seymour Duncan '59 Model (neck position). In the beginning of his career (during the recording of HIM's first EP) Lindström briefly used a Charvel and then a Jackson Soloist. He then started playing a Gibson Flying V before changing to the SG.

Lindström also used Fender Telecasters, an ESP Baritone, and a Gretsch Country Gentleman in the studio, as well as a Gibson EDS-1275, as seen in the music videos for HIM's "Right Here in My Arms" and "In Joy and Sorrow" respectively.

For the first HIM album, Lindström used a Marshall Valvestate amplifier during the Greatest Lovesongs era. It then got changed to a Laney VH100R during the razorblade romance era. During the Love Metal tour, Lindström started using two amplifiers simultaneously: one "overdriven but clear" without effects, and the other one with heavy effects and "so heavily distorted it sounded like the speaker cone was broken" (a wet-dry-setup). This produced the signature HIM guitar tone and the band sounded like it had two guitarists, like it did in the studio. For the Screamworks album, Lindström used a Laney Lionheart LH20. During the Tears On Tape tour, the other VH100R was changed to a Peavey 5150.

Lindström's live effects included Fulltone Octafuzz, Dunlop 105Q Bass Wah (which he finds "more aggressive than the guitar version"), and a Z.Vex Fuzz Factory. During HIM's farewell tour, the effects included Mad Professor Underdrive, Black Arts Toneworks Pharaoh Fuzz, Electro-Harmonix Octave Multiplexer, Voodoo Labs Amp Selector, and an MXR Booster.

== Discography ==
=== HIM ===
- Greatest Lovesongs Vol. 666 (1997)
- Razorblade Romance (2000)
- Deep Shadows and Brilliant Highlights (2001)
- Love Metal (2003)
- Dark Light (2005)
- Venus Doom (2007)
- Screamworks: Love in Theory and Practice (2010)
- Tears on Tape (2013)

=== Daniel Lioneye ===
- The King of Rock 'n Roll (2001)
- Vol. II (2010)
- Vol. III (2016)

=== Flat Earth ===
- None for One (2018)
- High on Lies (2022)

=== Other appearances ===
- Ihmepoika – Ihmepoika (2004)
- Jeff Walker und Die Fluffers – Welcome to Carcass Cuntry (2006)
- Manna – Sister (2007)
- WhoCares – "Out of My Mind / Holy Water" (2011)
- Michael Monroe and Sami Yaffa – Live member (2020, 2021)
