= Uneasy Listening =

Uneasy Listening may refer to:

- Uneasy Listening (Chumbawamba album)
- Uneasy Listening (Eerie Von album)

== See also ==
- Uneasy Listening Vol. 1, an album by HIM
- Uneasy Listening Vol. 2, an album by HIM
- Uneasy Listening Vol. 1 & 2, an album by HIM
