= Uneasy Listening Vol. 1 & 2 =

HIM compilation album series

The two volumes of Uneasy Listening are compilation albums by Finnish band HIM, initially issued separately, and then together.

== Vol. 1 ==
Uneasy Listening Vol. 1

Compilation album by HIM
- Released: 27 October 2006 (Germany and Ireland); 30 October 2006 (UK); 14 November 2006 (North America)
- Length: 74:54
- Labels: Sony BMG, Universal Republic, Jimmy Franks Recording Company
- Producers: Kevin Shirley, T.T. Oksala, John Fryer, Otto Donner

HIM chronology
Dark Light (2005)	Uneasy Listening Vol. 1 (2006)	Uneasy Listening Vol. 2 (2007)

Re-Release Cover

Professional ratings
Review scores
Source	Rating
Allmusic	3.5/5 stars

Uneasy Listening Vol. 1 contains special versions of various songs from their first four studio albums, most of which have already been released on various editions of their singles and released in October 2006. The album was re-released with a different cover due to legal issues with the original. The album's artwork is by Finnish artist Natas Pop, in emulation of the Art Nouveau style of Alphonse Mucha.

=== Sounds and themes ===
The album has been described as "In addition to a handful of remixes (see the ominous Thulsa Doom reworking of "Salt in Our Wounds"), the album presents acoustic renditions of the romance-obsessed songs[...] lushly orchestral takes that vaguely recalls the moody late-1960s work of avant-pop crooner Scott Walker. While not the best introduction to the revered goth/rock band, Uneasy Listening is an excellent HIM rarities collection that is sure to please the group's international legion of diehard fans".

=== Track listing ===
1. "The Sacrament" (Disrhythm Remix) – 4:47
2. "The Funeral of Hearts" (Acoustic Version) – 4:03
3. "Join Me in Death" (Strongroom Mix) – 3:40
4. "Close to the Flame" (The Rappula Tapes)* – 4:31
5. "In Joy and Sorrow" (String Version) – 5:04
6. "It's All Tears" (Unplugged Radio Live) – 3:49
7. "When Love and Death Embrace" (AOR Radio Mix) – 3:39
8. "Buried Alive by Love" (Deliverance Version) – 6:07
9. "Gone with the Sin" (O.D. Version) – 4:59
10. "Salt in Our Wounds" (Thulsa Doom Version) – 7:02
11. "Please Don't Let it Go" (Acoustic Version) – 4:37
12. "One Last Time" (Rockfield Madness Version)* – 5:08
13. "For You" (Unplugged Radio Live) – 4:09
14. "The Path" (P.S. Version)* – 5:04
15. "Lose You Tonight" (Thulsa Doom Extended Dub)* – 8:15
16. "Pretending" (Acoustic Version)** – 4:02
  - - Previously unreleased tracks
    - - Best Buy exclusive track

== Vol. 2 ==
Uneasy Listening Vol. 2

Compilation album by HIM
- Released: 20 April 2007 (Germany and Ireland); 24 April / 25, 2007 (Europe, Canada); 22 May 2007 (United States)
- Length: 62:26
- Labels: Sony BMG, Universal Republic, Jimmy Franks Recording Company

HIM chronology
Uneasy Listening Vol. 1 (2006)	Uneasy Listening Vol. 2 (2007)	Venus Doom (2007)

Professional ratings
Review scores
Source	Rating
Kerrang!	1/5 stars

Uneasy Listening Vol. 2 released on 20 April 2007 in Germany and Ireland, the 24th/25th in Finland and the rest of Europe, and on 22 May in the United States. As with Uneasy Listening Vol. 1, the album contains rare tracks and alternate versions of previously released tracks. The album's artwork is by Finnish artist Natas Pop.

=== Track listing ===
1. "Buried Alive by Love" (616 version)"* – 4:51
2. "Rendezvous with Anus" (Dein Arsch Ist Meiner, El Presidente version; Turbonegro cover)* – 3:10
3. "Sigillum Diaboli" (Studio Live Evil) – 3:53
4. "I Love You (Prelude to Tragedy)" (White House Version)* – 4:51
5. "The Beginning of the End" (Sad Damn Version)* – 3:53
6. "Again" (Hollovlad Tepes)* – 3:17
7. "Wicked Game" (live in Turku; Chris Isaak cover)* – 5:24
8. "Soul on Fire" (Erich Zann's Supernatural Remix)* – 3:55
9. "Beautiful" (Hollovlad Tepes)* – 3:32
10. "Endless Dark" (616 Version)* – 4:10
11. "Hand of Doom" (live in Turku; Black Sabbath cover) – 7:26
12. "Right Here in My Arms" (live in Turku)* – 4:02
13. "Sailin' On" (live in Turku; Bad Brains cover) – 1:57
14. "Pretending" (Cosmic Pope Jam version) – 8:00
- * previously unreleased tracks
