= Deep Shadows and Brilliant Highlights =

Studio album by HIM
- Released: 27 August 2001
- Recorded: 2000–2001
- Studio: Finnvox Studios in Helsinki; Petrax Studios in Hollola; Crystal Sound Studios in Helsinki
- Genre: Gothic rock; gothic metal
- Length: 40:52
- Label: BMG
- Producer: HIM; T. T. Oksala; Kevin Shirley

HIM chronology
Razorblade Romance (2000)	Deep Shadows and Brilliant Highlights (2001)	Love Metal (2003)

Singles from Deep Shadows and Brilliant Highlights
- 1. "Pretending" Released: 2001; 2. "In Joy and Sorrow" Released: 2001; 3. "Heartache Every Moment & Close to the Flame" Released: 2002

Deep Shadows and Brilliant Highlights is the third studio album by Finnish rock band HIM, released 27 August 2001. The album was produced by Kevin Shirley, T. T. Oksala and HIM. The record had a troubled production, which lasted approximately eleven months. The prolonged recording process was partially due outside influences within the music industry hoping to repeat the success of HIM's previous album. As a result, Deep Shadows and Brilliant Highlights features a sleeker and more pop-oriented sound. It is the first HIM album to feature keyboardist Janne "Burton" Puurtinen.

Deep Shadows and Brilliant Highlights received mixed reviews from music critics. While some gave praise to the songwriting and Ville Valo's vocal performance, most were highly critical of the production and overall commercial sound. Despite this, Deep Shadows and Brilliant Highlights charted in seven countries, peaking at number one in Finland and Austria. It would later go platinum and gold, respectively. Deep Shadows and Brilliant Highlights was also the band's first album to chart on the Billboard 200. Three singles were released, all of which reached the top two spots on the Finnish Singles Chart. The supporting tour for Deep Shadows and Brilliant Highlights saw HIM playing in the US for the first time, but overall strained the band to the point of nearly breaking up.

== Production ==
HIM began demoing songs for its third album in the northern fall of 2000 at Petrax Studios in Hollola, with producer T. T. Oksala. Satisfied with the initial recordings, the band hoped to use them on the album, with additional overdubs being done at a later date. However, BMG, HIM's record label, disagreed, with Valo believing they wanted a more well-known producer working on the album instead of Oksala. BMG's Asko Kallonen refuted these claims, stating that he and the label were worried by the band's plan to release "essentially demos" so soon after an exhausting touring cycle for Razorblade Romance. Under pressure from BMG's international branches to repeat the success of Razorblade Romance, HIM was paired with producer Kevin Shirley, who had previously worked with Bon Jovi, Aerosmith, and The Black Crowes, among others. While Shirley was excited to be working with the band, they were not entirely on board with his style of producing, in addition to the amount of money BMG had spent hiring him. However, Valo later admitted that some of Shirley's ideas did improve the songs.

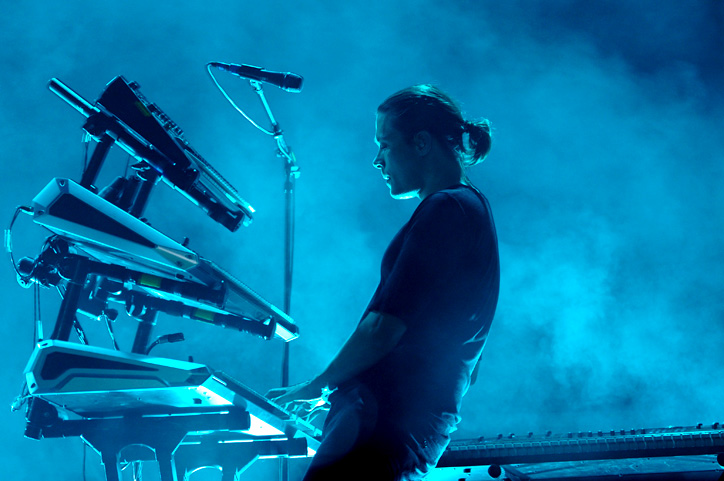
With the addition of keyboardist Burton, the band's line-up would remain unchanged until 2015

The recording process for HIM's third album lasted approximately eleven months. This had a profound effect on the songs, with Valo later noting: "When we started recording the third album, we were into stoner rock and Black Sabbath [...] At the end we were into Neil Young and it shows on the record." In addition, several outside forces within the music industry contributed to the album's troubled production. According to Valo: "The industry wasn't expecting [Razorblade Romance] to be such a hit that it was, so it meant that now there was like seventeen thousand different A&R people from the record companies and whatnots in the studio, and everybody had an opinion." During the album's recording process, keyboardist Janne "Burton" Puurtinen replaced Jussi-Mikko "Juska" Salminen, who played his final show with HIM on 31 December 2000.

After recording finished, the album was sent to Randy Staub and Chris Lord-Alge to mix. Additional mixing was done by John Fryer, who had produced the band's previous album. The record was then mastered by George Marino at Sterling Sound in New York. The title Deep Shadows and Brilliant Highlights is a photography term, which Valo chose because of its yin and yang symbolism, that had been prominent in the band's previous album titles as well. The original proposed album cover was rejected by BMG's UK branch. Thus, Valo was flown out to London for a photoshoot with Rankin. The resulting album cover for Deep Shadows and Brilliant Highlights took inspiration from Lou Reed, Patti Smith, and late 1970s New York City art circles.

== Music and lyrics ==
"Heartache Every Moment" (2001)
"Heartache Every Moment" was described by Ville Valo as HIM's "best calling card yet" at Ruisrock in July 2001.

The overall sound of Deep Shadows and Brilliant Highlights has been described by music critics as more commercial and "poppy" than HIM's previous albums. "Salt in Our Wounds" was deliberately chosen as the first track on the album to mess with the listeners' expectations, due to its use of looping and other effects. Despite the track's experimental nature, Valo referred to it as "the record's Neil Young song". "Heartache Every Moment" features many of HIM's signature sonic elements, including "tongue-in-cheek" gothic lyrics, piano, rough guitars and a "howling melody". Valo also noted a distinct Bon Jovi influence in the song. "Lose You Tonight" changed the most throughout the recording process. It began in the style of Cathedral, before ending up like "Bon Jovi on mushrooms" as Valo described it. "In Joy and Sorrow" features guest performances by Apocalyptica's Eino "Eicca" Toppinen and composer Tuomas Kantelinen. Valo compared the song to "Sweet Child o' Mine" by Guns N' Roses, singling out the lyrics' "no frills, self-ironic directness" as one of the song's best qualities.

"Pretending" was chosen by BMG to be the first single from the album. While Valo has admitted to being indifferent towards the song, he still singled out its relaxed nature and lyrics as particular highlights. Valo described "Close to the Flame" as "sincere and direct", very similar in tone to "Gone with the Sin" from the band's previous album. "Please Don't Let It Go" began in the style of The Stooges, but after Valo recorded an acoustic version, the band chose to combine the two arrangements. "Beautiful" also began life as a more uptempo song, but the band felt the arrangement didn't fit, so it was reworked in the style of John Frusciante's first solo album. "Don't Close Your Heart" was described by Valo as "Jefferson Airplane meets Bon Jovi". Lyrically it tackles with similar themes as "Join Me in Death", but from a different perspective. According to Valo, the song talks about how "if things go to shit, you don't have to sink into the swamp. You can ask for help and not close your heart". "Love You Like I Do" was described as "Elvis on acid" and makes use of church bells, which was done in tribute to Black Sabbath.

== Release and promotion ==
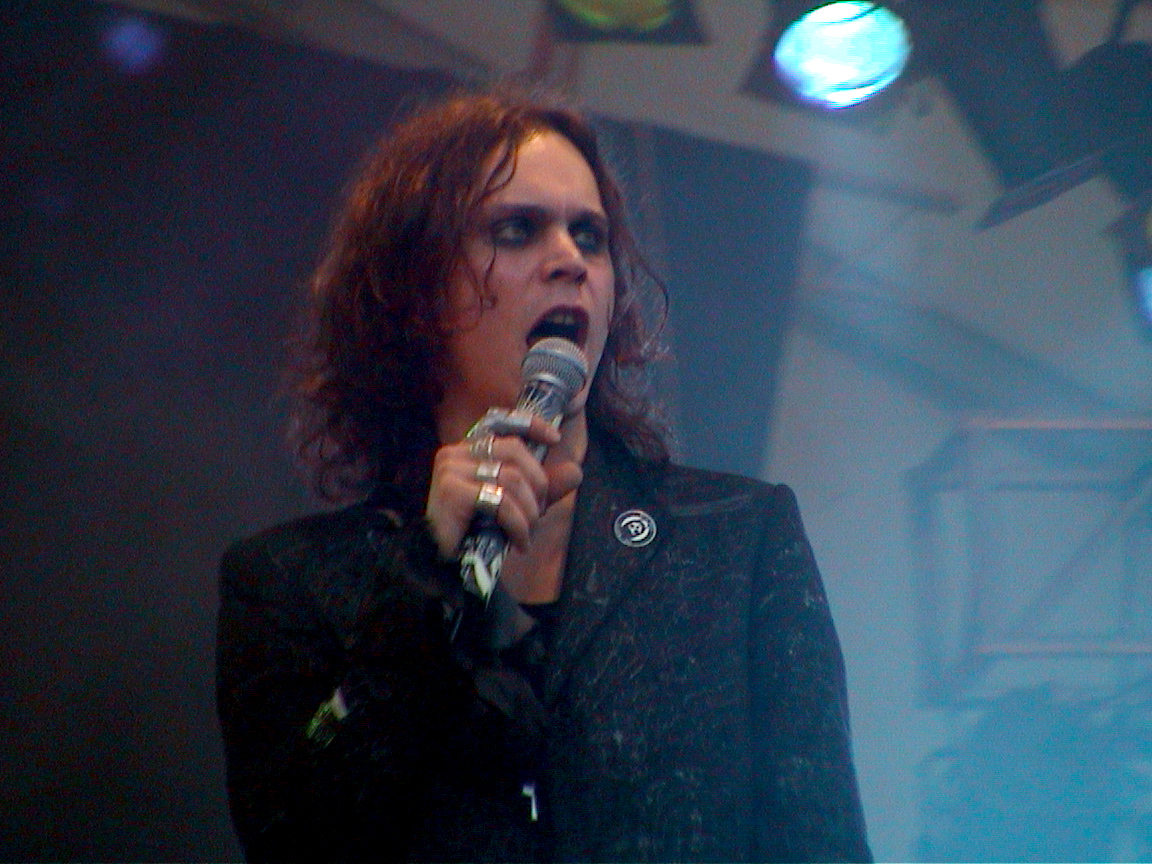
Ville Valo performing with HIM at Ruisrock in July 2001

The album was originally slated for released in May 2001, but was pushed back to August to accommodate a supporting tour. Deep Shadows and Brilliant Highlights was released on 27 August 2001, and it charted in six countries, peaking at number one in Finland and Austria, as well as number two in Germany and Switzerland. The album would later be certified platinum in Finland and gold in Austria. Deep Shadows and Brilliant Highlights also charted in the United States in 2004 at number 190, making it the band's first album to hit the Billboard 200. "Pretending" was released as the album's first single, and it peaked at number one in Finland and number ten in Germany. The band initially wanted Miikka Lommi to helm the music video, but BMG and its UK marketing department refused, wanting Kevin Godley instead. "In Joy and Sorrow" was released as the second single, hitting number two in Finland. The accompanying music video was later described by Valo as the group's "shittiest" video. "Heartache Every Moment" and "Close to the Flame" were released as a double single, with the former peaking at number two in Finland. Both tracks also received music videos.

In August 2001, HIM were invited to play their first show in the US at a party organized by professional skateboarder Bam Margera, whom the band had met while on tour for Razorblade Romance. The official supporting tour for Deep Shadows and Brilliant Highlights began on 17 September 2001 in Hamburg, with Timo Rautiainen & Trio Niskalaukaus and The Mission serving as opening acts for the German leg. The European tour for Deep Shadows and Brilliant Highlights lasted four months and 44 shows, which nearly resulted in the band breaking up. Valo later explained: "The stress was at a level where I [was pissed off] the entire run – I had done this for three years straight without a vacation. No wonder the dams broke at some point." As a result, HIM took a two-month hiatus in early 2002. Guitarist Mikko "Linde" Lindström and bassist Mikko "Mige" Paananen headed to Nepal, drummer Mika "Gas Lipstick" Karppinen flew to New York, keyboardist Janne "Burton" Puurtinen vacationed in Turkey, while Ville Valo stayed in Helsinki. HIM regrouped at the turn of February and March 2002, when Deep Shadows and Brilliant Highlights was officially released in the UK. In support, the band played two shows in Birmingham and London, respectively, with the first being sold-out and the second supporting The Mission. HIM was also named Export of the Year at the Emma Awards. The band also received the Viewers' Choice Award at the VIVA Comet Awards. In March 2002, HIM began another Finnish tour, with The Skreppers serving as support. Afterwards, HIM returned to the UK for a full tour.

== Reception ==
Professional ratings
Review scores
Source	Rating
AllMusic	2.5/5 stars
Blabbermouth.net	9/10
Rock Hard	6.5/10
Rumba	6/10
Soundi	2/5 stars

Deep Shadows and Brilliant Highlights received mixed reviews from critics. Borivoj Krgin, writing for Blabbermouth.net, gave the album a score of nine out of ten. He described the record as "the group's most accessible offering so far", giving praise to the songwriting and Valo's vocal delivery, which he called the "most potently effective weapon in the group's musical arsenal". While disappointed by the album's softer sound, Krgin concluded his review by stating that "in purely artistic and commercial terms – HIM have made the logical follow-up album to one of last year's highlights, and they continue to cement their reputation as one of the most unique and consistent rock acts around." Rock Hard's Thomas Kupfer, meanwhile, criticized the album's production and mellower sound, but did give cudos to some of the songwriting. Ultimately though, he deemed Deep Shadows and Brilliant Highlights "no more than a good pop album". This was echoed by Jani Mikkonen of Helsingin Sanomat, who described the album's best moments as "straight-up pop songs".

Rumba's Janne Flinkkilä rated the record a six out of ten, stating: "Every song has been squeezed into a tight hit format, where the song structures move as predictably as the seasons change." He also noted how Shirley and Oksala's production brings "Valo's asthmatic breathing sounds to an almost comical scope". Ultimately, Flinkkilä stated that "HIM hasn't made a bad album", but "compared to the gothic gloominess of past albums, Deep Shadows and Brilliant Highlights sounds very light". Antti J. Ravelin of AllMusic awarded the album two-and-a-half stars out of five, describing it as "utterly boring" and the songs as "lacking hooks". In general, he described Deep Shadows and Brilliant Highlights as a "horrible failure" musically. Tero Alanko of Soundi felt similarly, deeming the record "ideal music for girls, who don't dig the music, but Ville Valo's looks and his lyrics' decadent imagery". He also described the record as "anemic" and "devoid of moments, where the best parts of the band come together to form something more that the sum of their parts."

In 2017, Valo revisited Deep Shadows and Brilliant Highlights and described it as a "fragmented, unnatural record", stating: "We were recovering from the cannon that was the last album and the way back to ground was through a lot of fumbling. There were too many chefs on the record than there should have been, so the end result was incoherent." Loudwire ranked Deep Shadows and Brilliant Highlights sixth in HIM's discography, describing it as not "the follow-up to Razorblade Romance that fans had hoped for", but still commending the "hooks" and Valo's vocal performance. Kaaoszine ranked the record fifth in HIM's discography, commending many of the song, while noting that the album is not "as strong of an ensemble" as some of the band's other work.

== Track listing ==
=== Original release ===
All tracks are written by Ville Valo.

No.	Title	Length
1.	"Salt in Our Wounds"	3:58
2.	"Heartache Every Moment"	3:56
3.	"Lose You Tonight"	3:42
4.	"In Joy and Sorrow"	4:00
5.	"Pretending"	3:55
6.	"Close to the Flame"	3:46
7.	"Please Don't Let It Go"	4:29
8.	"Beautiful"	4:33
9.	"Don't Close Your Heart"	4:39
10.	"Love You Like I Do"	5:14
Total length:		40:52

Special limited edition
No.	Title	Length
11.	"Again"	3:32
12.	"In Joy and Sorrow" (string version)	5:04
13.	"Pretending" (The Cosmic Pope Jam version)	8:00

=== Digipak / Remastered edition ===
No.	Title	Length
1.	"Salt in Our Wounds"	3:58
2.	"Heartache Every Moment"	3:56
3.	"Lose You Tonight"	3:42
4.	"In Joy and Sorrow"	4:00
5.	"Pretending"	3:55
6.	"Close to the Flame"	3:46
7.	"You Are the One"	3:25
8.	"Please Don't Let It Go"	4:29
9.	"Beautiful"	4:33
10.	"In Love and Lonely"	3:46
11.	"Don't Close Your Heart"	4:39
12.	"Love You Like I Do"	5:14
Total length:		51:47

=== Remastered edition bonus disc ===
No.	Title	Length
1.	"Again" (Hollola Tapes)	3:21
2.	"Pretending" (TRNSFRMTN Version)	3:54
3.	"Lose You Tonight" (Hollola Tapes)	4:17
4.	"Salt in Our Wounds" (John Fryer Mix)	4:05
5.	"Close to the Flame" (Hollola Tapes)	4:31
6.	"Please Don't Let It Go" (Hollola Tapes)	3:40
7.	"Pretending" (Kevin Shirley Mix)	4:04
8.	"Love You Like I Do" (Hollola Tapes)	5:29
Total length:		33:21

== Personnel ==
HIM

- Ville Valo − lead vocals, keyboards, artwork
- Mikko "Linde" Lindström − guitar
- Mikko "Mige" Paananen − bass
- Janne "Burton" Puurtinen − keyboards
- Mika "Gas Lipstick" Karppinen − drums

Guest musicians

- Eicca Toppinen – cello on "In Joy and Sorrow"
- Tuomas Kantelinen – strings on "In Joy and Sorrow"

Production

- HIM - production (tracks: 1, 2, 3, 4, 6, 8, 9, 10)
- T.T. Oksala - production (tracks: 1, 2, 3, 4, 6, 8, 9, 10), engineering, mixing (tracks: 8)
- Kevin Shirley - production (tracks: 1, 2, 4, 5, 7), engineering
- John Fryer - mixing (tracks: 3, 6, 9), additional production (tracks: 1)
- Chris Lord-Alge - mixing (tracks: 1, 2, 4, 7)
- Randy Staub - mixing (tracks: 5)
- George Marino - mastering
- Rankin - photography
- Janne Uotila - artwork

== Charts ==
=== Weekly charts ===
Chart (2001–2004)	Peak position
Austrian Albums (Ö3 Austria)	1
Finnish Albums (Suomen virallinen lista)	1
German Albums (Offizielle Top 100)	2
Hungarian Albums (MAHASZ)	6
Italian Albums (FIMI)	37
Swedish Albums (Sverigetopplistan)	44
Swiss Albums (Schweizer Hitparade)	2
US Billboard 200	190
US Heatseekers Albums (Billboard)	10
Chart (2014)	Peak position
US Vinyl Albums (Billboard)	11

=== Year-end charts ===
Chart (2001)	Position
Austrian Albums (Ö3 Austria)	71
German Albums (Offizielle Top 100)	29
Swiss Albums (Schweizer Hitparade)	80

== Certifications ==
Region	Certification	Certified units/sales
Austria (IFPI Austria)	Gold	20,000^{*}
Finland (Musiikkituottajat)	Platinum	58,009
Germany (BVMI)	Gold	100,000^{‡}
Switzerland (IFPI Switzerland)	Gold	20,000^{^}
^{*} Sales figures based on certification alone.^{^} Shipments figures based on certification alone.^{‡} Sales+streaming figures based on certification alone.

== Book sources ==
- Juntunen, J. K. (2002). Synnin viemää. WSOY. ISBN 951027304X.
