= Burton (musician) =

Finnish keyboardist (born 1974)

Janne Puurtinen
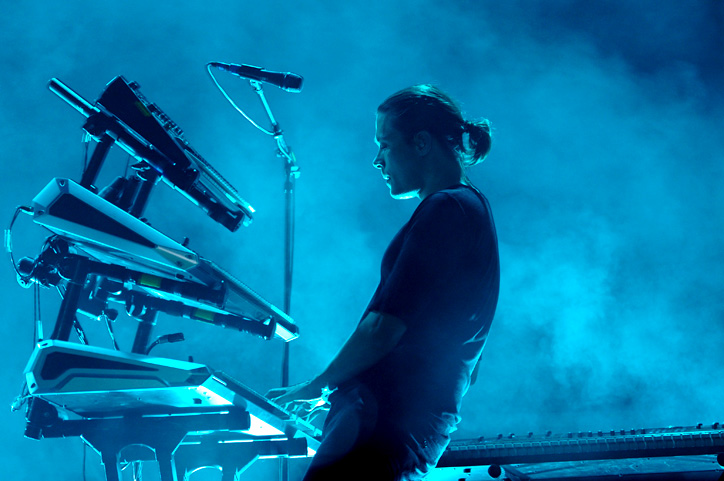
- Puurtinen performing in 2010

Background information
- Also known as: Emerson Burton, King Tut
- Born: Janne Johannes Puurtinen; 17 October 1974 (age 51); Helsinki, Finland
- Genres: Gothic rock; alternative metal; alternative rock
- Occupation: Musician
- Instruments: Keyboards; piano
- Years active: 2001–present
- Website: heartagram.com

Janne Johannes Puurtinen (born 17 October 1974), better known as Burton or Emerson Burton, is a Finnish musician. He is best known as the keyboardist of the Finnish gothic rock band HIM, with whom he has released six studio albums, and has gone on to become one of the most commercially successful Finnish bands of all time. Outside of HIM, Burton has performed and recorded with various bands, including Daniel Lioneye, Suburban Tribe and Torpedo.

== Early life ==
Janne "Burton" Puurtinen was born on 17 October 1974 in Helsinki. Born to an artistic family, both Burton's parents were ballet dancers, as was his sister. Burton himself took up ballet for a few years but quit due to a lack of interest, after which he began taking classical piano lessons at the age of five, which he continued well into his twenties. During his civilian service, Puurtinen worked as a lighting engineer at the Alexander Theatre in Helsinki. He later worked as a stage manager at the Helsinki Opera House, a concert janitor at the Sibelius Academy, as well as a cook.

== Career ==
=== HIM ===
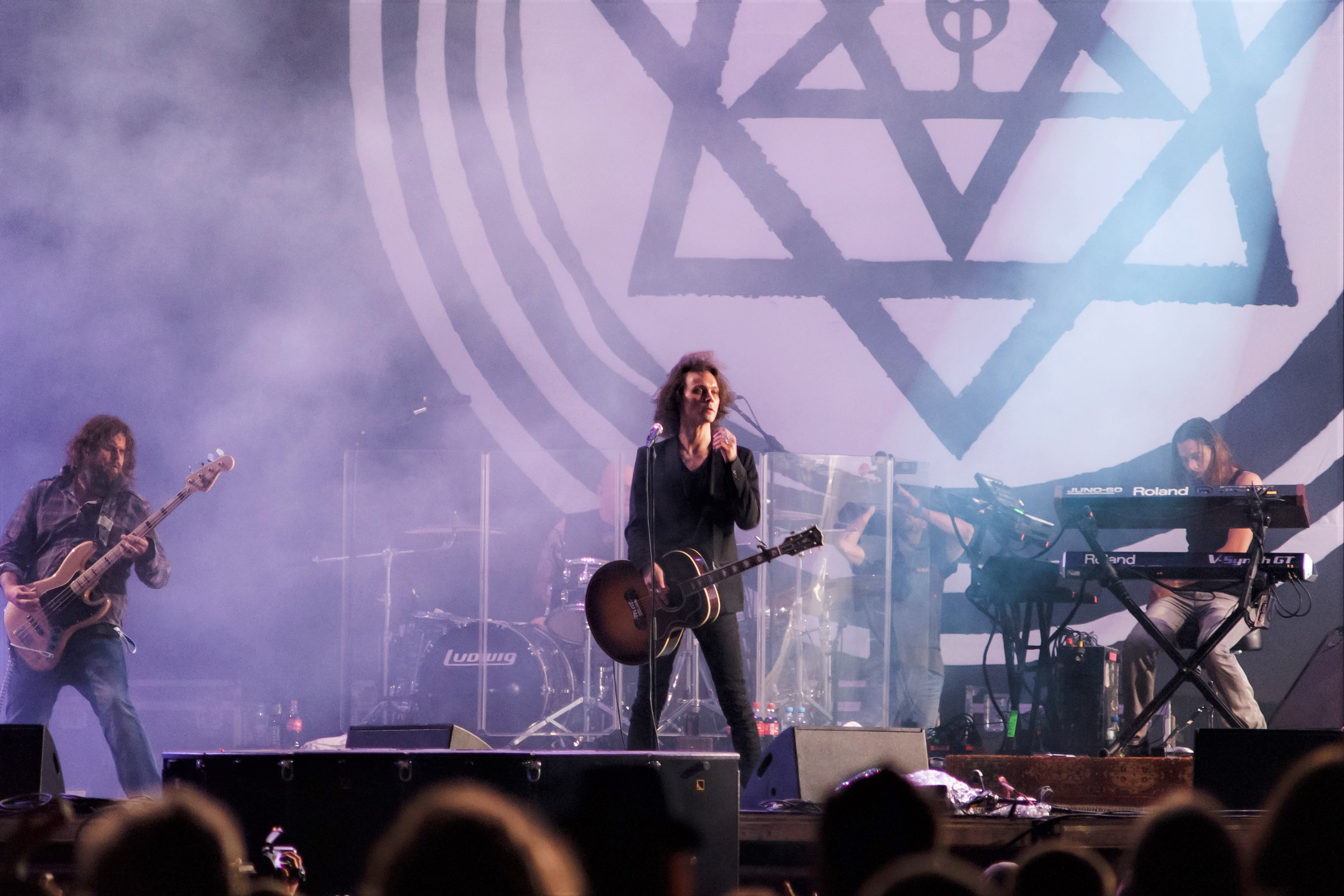
Burton (right) performing live with HIM in June 2013

In 2001, Puurtinen joined the band HIM, with whom he had already played one show in the mid-nineties performing Type O Negative covers. After the addition of Puurtinen, HIM released the albums Deep Shadows and Brilliant Highlights and Love Metal in 2001 and 2003, respectively. Both cracked the top ten in several countries, and became the band's first albums to chart in the United Kingdom and the United States. In 2005, HIM released Dark Light, which became the group's most successful album to date, going gold in Germany, the UK, the US, and platinum in Finland.

In 2007, HIM released Venus Doom, which went gold in Finland and Germany, and gave the band their highest US-chart position at number 12. After 2010's Screamworks: Love in Theory and Practice, the band went on hiatus after drummer Gas Lipstick was diagnosed with a repetitive stress injury and nerve damage in his hands. After eight months of uncertainty, the band regrouped and eventually released the album Tears on Tape in 2013. In 2015, Gas Lipstick announced his departure from HIM after 16 years, to pursue other musical projects. He was subsequently replaced by Jukka "Kosmo" Kröger. On 5 March 2017, HIM announced the end of the band following a farewell tour in 2017. The band played their final show on New Year's Eve 2017 as a part of their annual Helldone Festival.

=== Other work ===
While in school, Burton played in a variety of different bands, but the first "real" group he played with was Cosmos Tango, who won the Finnish Rock Championship in 1997. Cosmos Tango released one album in 1999, by which point Burton had already joined Suburban Tribe, with whom he recorded the album Elektro 57, which was released in 1998. Around the same time, Puurtinen also played one show with Amorphis in Istanbul. In 1999, Puurtinen joined Torpedo, who released a self-titled EP in 2000, as well as the album Polttonestettä in 2001.

In 2010, Puurtinen joined Daniel Lioneye, the side-project of HIM's Linde Lindström. The band released the album Vol. II the same year, and in 2011 toured the US, supporting Cradle of Filth. In June 2016, it was announced that Daniel Lioneye would release its third album Vol. III on 19 August 2016. The band also announced five tour dates across Finland for September 2016. Daniel Lioneye was also scheduled to perform several European shows later in the fall, but the dates were cancelled after drummer Seppo Tarvainen broke his arm.

Following HIM's retirement, Burton joined the Finnish world music duo Solju, who released their debut album Ođđa Áigodat on 27 April 2018.

== Personal life ==
Burton has two children with his wife. The nicknames "Burton" and "Emerson Burton" were coined by two friends, with "Emerson" being taken from Puurtinen's refrigerator.

== Discography ==
=== HIM ===
- Deep Shadows and Brilliant Highlights (2001)
- Love Metal (2003)
- Dark Light (2005)
- Venus Doom (2007)
- Screamworks: Love in Theory and Practice (2010)
- Tears on Tape (2013)

=== Daniel Lioneye ===
- Vol. II (2010)
- Vol. III (2016)

=== Other appearances ===
- Suburban Tribe – Elektro 57 (1998)
- Cosmos Tango – Helmi (1999)
- Torpedo – Torpedo (2000)
- Torpedo – Polttonestettä (2001)
