= Daniel Lioneye =

Finnish rock band

- Left to right: Burton, Seppo Tarvainen, Linde Lindström, Mige (2016)

Background information
- Also known as: Daniel Lioneye and The Joint Rollers, Daniel Lioneye and The Rollers
- Origin: Helsinki, Finland
- Genres: Stoner rock, alternative metal
- Years active: 2001, 2010–2011, 2014, 2016
- Labels: BMG; The End
- Spinoff of: HIM
- Members: Mikko "Linde" Lindström; Mikko "Mige" Paananen; Janne "Burton" Puurtinen; Seppo Tarvainen
- Past members: Ville Valo; Hiili Hiilesmaa; Ike Vil; Black Vomit Bolton; Manu Patel

Daniel Lioneye is a Finnish rock band formed by members of the band HIM. Originally consisting of guitarist and vocalist Mikko "Linde" Lindström, bassist Mikko "Mige" Paananen and drummer Ville Valo, the group released their debut album The King of Rock 'n Roll in 2001, the title track of which was later used as the theme to Bam Margera's Viva La Bam TV series.

In 2010, the newly reformed Daniel Lioneye, now with Black Vomit Bolton on drums and HIM's Janne "Burton" Puurtinen on keyboards, recorded and released the album Vol. II. In 2011, the band toured the United States, with Mige once again on bass, Seppo Tarvainen on drums and Manu Patel on backing vocals. In 2014, the original line-up of Daniel Lioneye reunited at HIM's annual Helldone Festival. In 2016, Daniel Lioneye, with Lindström, Mige, Burton and Tarvainen, released their third album Vol. III.

== History ==
=== The King of Rock 'n Roll (2001) ===
Daniel Lioneye was formed by members of the Finnish rock band HIM in 2001. Composed of vocalist-guitarist Mikko "Linde" Lindström, drummer Ville Valo and bassist Mikko "Mige" Paananen, the band was born as a way to relieve stress brought on by the amount of success HIM was achieving at the time, according to Valo. Prior to their debut album, Daniel Lioneye had played only a few shows at various parties around Finland.

When the group entered the studio to record their debut album with producer Hiili Hiilesmaa, they only had three songs ready, while the rest were written while recording. According to Lindström, none of the material was initially intended to be released, as the group had already collaborated with Hiilesmaa for many years on unreleased experimental music. Daniel Lioneye eventually decided to release their debut album The King of Rock 'n Roll "as a joke" in the spring of 2001 in Finland and Germany Described as "psychedelic stoner rock", with lyrics largely dealing with themes of "sex, drugs and rock 'n' roll", The King of Rock 'n Roll received negative reviews from critics, with Pertti Ojala of Soundi calling the album "dirty, loud and diversely unpleasant". Despite this, the album's title-track was later used by professional skateboarder and television personality Bam Margera as the opening theme to his TV series Viva La Bam. The song later became the second-most-played Finnish song in the world in 2006. The album's release was followed by a three-date festival tour across Finland. For these shows the band recruited Hiilesmaa on keyboards, while Ike Vil provided sound effects.

=== Vol. II (2010–2011) ===
In February 2010, Daniel Lioneye announced they would release their sophomore album Vol. II in April 2010, via The End Records. Now with fellow HIM-member Janne "Burton" Puurtinen on keyboards, as well Black Vomit Bolton replacing Ville Valo on drums, Daniel Lioneye's second album featured a much heavier sound than their debut, being described by Lindström as "extreme rock n' roll", with influences from black metal. Vol. II received mixed reviews, with Antti Mattila of Soundi awarding it three out of five stars, while Eduardo Rivadavia of AllMusic called it "clearly a hit-and-miss affair". In 2011, Daniel Lioneye embarked on their first tour of the United States, supporting Cradle of Filth, with Seppo Tarvainen on drums, as well as Manu Patel on backing vocals.

=== Vol. III (2014–2016) ===
On 30 December 2014, the original line-up of Daniel Lioneye reunited for a performance at HIM's annual New Year's Eve festival Helldone. When asked about the possibility of new music, Lindström responded: "Let's see if something could happen already next year." Nothing surfaced in 2015; however, on 29 June 2016, Daniel Lioneye announced that they would release their third album Vol. III on 19 August 2016, with Lindström on guitar and vocals, Mige on bass, Burton on keyboards and Tarvainen on drums. The band also announced a five date tour across Finland for September 2016. On 30 June 2016, Daniel Lioneye released the official track-listing for Vol. III, as well as its first single "Ravensong". According to Lindström, musically the album would be a combination of its two predecessors, with "more fuzz-guitar, more singing, and less growling".

On 4 August 2016, Daniel Lioneye released the official music video for the song "Aetherside", directed by Matti Penttila. Vol. III received positive reviews from critics, with Neil Z. Yeung of Allmusic stating "Vol. III is [Daniel Lioneye's] most accomplished effort, balanced by equal measures of ferocity and harmony, professionally on par with anything the guys have done with HIM", which was echoed by Jarkko Jokelainen of Helsingin Sanomat, who gave the album four out of five stars. The band were scheduled to perform several European shows in the fall of 2016, but the dates were cancelled after drummer Seppo Tarvainen broke his arm.

== Discography ==
- The King of Rock 'n Roll (2001)
- Vol. II (2010)
- Vol. III (2016)

== Members ==
Current members

- Mikko "Linde" Lindström – guitar, vocals (2001, 2010–2011, 2014, 2016)
- Mikko "Mige" Paananen – bass guitar (2001, 2010–2011, 2014, 2016)
- Janne "Burton" Puurtinen – keyboards (2010–2011, 2016)
- Seppo Tarvainen – drums (2010–2011, 2016)

Former members

- Ville Valo – drums (2001, 2014)
- Hiili Hiilesmaa – keyboards (2001)
- Ike Vil – sound effects (2001)
- Black Vomit Bolton – drums (2010)
- Manu Patel – backing vocals (2011)
