= Razorblade Romance =

Studio album by HIM
- Released: 24 January 2000
- Recorded: 1999
- Studios: Rockfield (Rockfield, Wales)
- Genres: Gothic rock; gothic metal
- Length: 42:40
- Label: BMG
- Producer: John Fryer

HIM chronology
Greatest Lovesongs Vol. 666 (1997)	Razorblade Romance (2000)	Deep Shadows and Brilliant Highlights (2001)

Singles from Razorblade Romance
- 1. "Join Me in Death" Released: November 1999; 2. "Right Here in My Arms" Released: March 2000; 3. "Your Sweet Six Six Six" Released: June 2000; 4. "Poison Girl" Released: July 2000; 5. "Gone with the Sin" Released: October 2000; 6. "Wicked Game" Released: November 2000

Razorblade Romance is the second studio album by Finnish rock band HIM, recorded with producer John Fryer. HIM initially began recording the album with producer Hiili Hiilesmaa, who had helmed the group's 1997 debut album, however these sessions proved unsuccessful, and HIM parted ways with Hiilesmaa, and recruited Fryer. The band, along with Fryer, relocated to Rockfield Studios in Wales to begin recording, and released the album on 24 January 2000. Musically, the album featured a sleeker production and a more melodic sound compared to their debut. The album's lead single "Join Me in Death" would prove to be HIM's breakthrough single, reaching number one in Finland and Germany. The song also featured on the soundtrack of the 1999 science fiction film The Thirteenth Floor.

Razorblade Romance received mostly positive reviews from critics, with particular praise being given to the songwriting, while the more polished production received some criticism. The album also charted in six countries, peaking at number one in Finland, Germany and Austria, later going double platinum, triple gold, and gold respectively. Razorblade Romance would also go on to chart in the United States in January 2004, making it the band's first album to chart in the US. HIM also won "Album of the Year" at the 2000 Emma Awards, as well as were awarded at the 2004 IFPI Platinum Europe Awards. Three further singles were released from the album, two of which reached number one in Finland. Razorblade Romance was followed by an intensive supporting tour, which nearly resulted in the band breaking up. The album was also HIM's first to feature drummer Mika "Gas Lipstick" Karppinen, and the only to feature keyboardist Jussi-Mikko "Juska" Salminen.

== Production ==
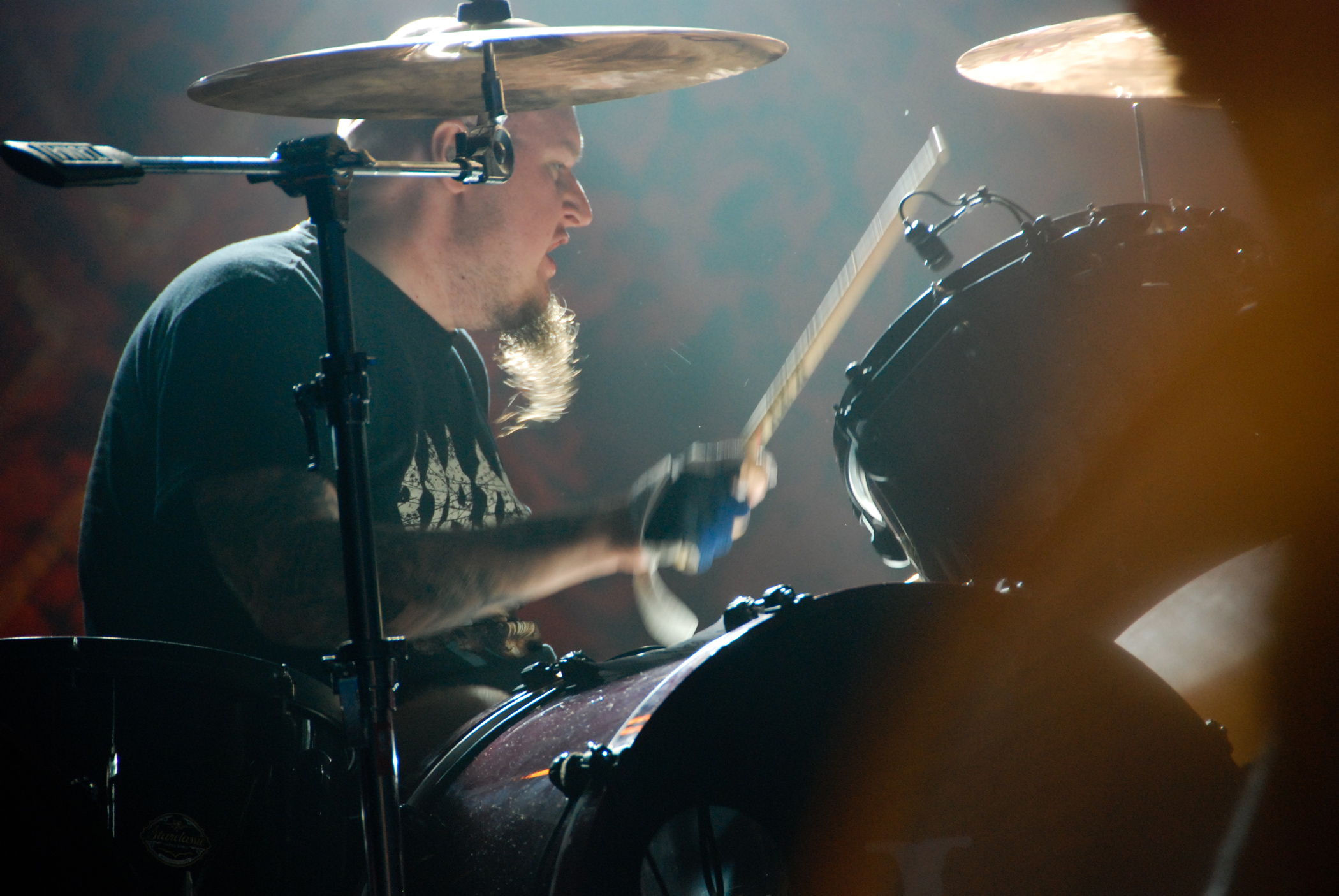
Razorblade Romance saw the addition of drummer Gas Lipstick, who would stay with the band until 2015

HIM began work on their second album at MD-Studios in Munkkiniemi, with producer Hiili Hiilesmaa, who had produced their debut album. These sessions proved to be unsuccessful however, with Hiilesmaa suffering from exhaustion and relationships within the band going sour. Bassist Mikko "Mige" Paananen later remarked: "Ville [Valo] would be raving in the studio, and we'd just play so we could quickly go home. You just didn't bother saying 'this sucks' anymore." HIM eventually parted ways with Hiilesmaa in January 1999, by which point they had demoed four songs. The band's record label BMG soon decided that HIM's next album should be recorded abroad with a name producer. The band eventually decided on John Fryer, who had previously worked with Nine Inch Nails and Cradle of Filth among others, and flew to Rockfield Studios in Wales to commence recording their album.

The first two songs to be recorded were "I Love You (Prelude to Tragedy)" and "Poison Girl", which Fryer began mixing early on while the band left to go on tour. When they returned, the band found the initial mixes to be horrible, which they later discovered to be the doing of Per Kviman, who had been instructing Fryer on how to mix the songs. After letting go of Kviman, HIM continued recording, with Valo later remarking that the studio sessions were "all in all incredibly fun" . He stated: "It was damn fun getting out of those familiar circles and just focus on the album, and not worry about anything else. It also felt great that the band was together all the time".

After recording finished, Fryer and Valo began mixing the album in London, and were once again horrified to find that "everything sounded like shit". After spending 15 000 euros trying to properly mix the album in London, Fryer and Valo flew to Finland where, with the help of Risto Hemmi from Finnvox, they were finally able to mix the record. The initial mixes were later released on the Uneasy Listening albums as well as the 2014 remastered edition of Razorblade Romance as the "Rockfield Madness" versions and "Strongroom Sessions" respectively. After finishing the mixing, the tapes were flown to Sterling Sound in New York, where they were mastered by George Marino. Valo initially wanted the album to be called Goth 'n' Roll, but BMG refused, preferring the previously suggested title Razorblade Romance. The cover art was designed by Janne Uotila with photographs by Jouko Lehtola, and was influenced by the style of 1980s glam rock and pop acts. The budget of the album eventually grew to nearly 150 000 euros.

== Music and lyrics ==
"Join Me in Death" (1999)
"Join Me in Death" was HIM's breakthrough single, reaching number one in Finland and Germany, eventually going platinum in their home country, and gold in Germany and Austria.

The overall sound of Razorblade Romance features less focus on guitar than the band's debut, in favor of a sleeker and more melodic sound, influenced by the music of the 1980s. "I Love You (Prelude to Tragedy)" was first considered for Greatest Lovesongs Vol. 666, and was thus demoed several times. Valo described the song as an "apt intro for the record. Short, tight, and smacks you right in the face". "Poison Girl" was written about a specific girl in Valo's life and about "how you can destroy something so beautiful". "Join Me in Death" was the first single chosen from the album, and was written around the time of Greatest Lovesongs Vol. 666's release. Valo continued to work on the song for approximately two years, and took influence from '80s music and the album Isola by Kent. Lyrically, the song was inspired by Romeo and Juliet, as well as Blue Öyster Cult's "(Don't Fear) The Reaper", and talks about "how far are you willing to go for somebody you care for". According to Valo, "Join Me in Death" was also the first song to feature "that corniness and tongue-in-cheek nature, that was missing from the first album". The UK division of BMG initially refused to release the album, as they felt that "Join Me in Death" was too much of a "schlager", fearing it would ruin the rest of the album.

"Right Here in My Arms" and "Resurrection" were written around the same time Valo was working on "Join Me in Death", thus both retain the same '80s influence. Valo described "Right Here in My Arms" as a "Billy Idol ripoff" and "Resurrection" as what "Bon Jovi putting on goth masks" would sound like. "Gone with the Sin" was singled out by Valo as one of his favorites from the album, calling it "a simple love song, but where the cliches have been turned on their heads". Lyrically, the song was inspired by a relationship of Valo's, in which "both participants weren't doing that well". Valo described "Razorblade Kiss" as HIM's "tribute to Kiss and rock 'n' roll" and "Bury Me Deep Inside Your Heart" as "Depeche Mode meets Roxette". The bass line of "Heaven Tonight" makes use of a wah-wah pedal, which was operated by Valo, while Mige played the part. According to Valo, the "heaven" in the lyrics symbolizes "something happy happening or some sort of fulfillment". "Death Is in Love with Us" was described by Valo as a "goth anthem" and was considered for the opening of the album. "One Last Time" was written with the idea of having a happier end to the record, and was described by Valo as the "apology" at the end of the "romance" that begins with "I Love You (Prelude to Tragedy)", and serves as the final plea to "try one last time". While recording vocals for the song, Valo was surrounded by the rest of the band (sans drummer Mika "Gas Lipstick" Karppinen) sitting naked in a lotus position. The band also forced keyboardist Juska Salminen to record the song naked, which took two hours of convincing. For the international editions of the album, HIM also re-recorded the tracks "Your Sweet 666" and "Wicked Game" from their debut album, as well as "Stigmata Diaboli" from the EP 666 Ways to Love: Prologue, which was retitled "Sigillum Diaboli".

== Release and promotion ==
Cover art for Razorblade Romance under the moniker HER

HIM initially wanted to release Razorblade Romance in the fall of 1999 in Finland, in order to start a supporting tour, but BMG Germany refused, fearing the album would be bought there through importing. Thus it was decided that Razorblade Romance would be released simultaneously in Finland and internationally. "Join Me in Death" was released as the first single from the album in November 1999, and charted in seven countries, reaching number one in Finland and Germany. "Join Me in Death" would eventually be certified platinum in Finland, and gold in Germany and Austria. BMG had been reluctant to release the song as a single, but eventually complied, after the song was chosen to appear on the soundtrack of the 1999 science fiction film The Thirteenth Floor. The version included in the film and released as a single was an early mix, not included on the finished album. Two music videos were produced for the song; the first featured the single mix as well as scenes from The Thirteenth Floor, while the second was shot in England and directed by Billy Yukich. HIM was later invited to perform on Germany's Top of the Pops to promote the song. Razorblade Romance was released on 24 January 2000 and charted in six countries, peaking at number one in Finland, Germany and Austria. The album would eventually go double platinum in Finland, triple gold in Germany, and gold in Austria. Razorblade Romance also charted at number eight on the US Heatseekers Chart in January 2004, making it the band's first album to chart in the United States.

After the album's release, HIM began the supporting tour for Razorblade Romance with a seventeen date Finnish leg, which was entirely sold-out. This was followed by a European tour, which lasted nine months and 88 shows. In May 2000, HIM also embarked on their first tour of England, which lasted six dates, starting at The Garage in London. The intense touring cycle and promotional work exhausted the band, to the point where Valo nearly fell off the balcony of a hotel, before being pulled back by friends, and Salminen ended up in the emergency room after a prank gone wrong. HIM nearly disbanded during this time, but things eventually settled down and the band continued touring. "Right Here in My Arms", "Gone with the Sin" and "Poison Girl" were released as the follow-up singles from the album, with the former two peaking at number one in Finland, and the latter at number three. All three singles also made the German Singles Chart and received music videos. The re-recorded "Your Sweet 666" and "Wicked Game" were also released as singles in the UK, with the latter receiving a new music video.

HIM were awarded "Band of the Year", and "Album of the Year" for Razorblade Romance, at the 2000 Emma Awards, as well as the "Viewers' Choice Award", and "Video of the Year" for "Join Me in Death", at the 2000 VIVA Comet Awards. Razorblade Romance would also be awarded at the 2004 IFPI Platinum Europe Awards. In 2001, HIM were involved in a dispute over the rights to their name in the United States, as the moniker "HIM" was already owned by a drummer from a Chicago jazz fusion band of the same name. This meant that HIM were renamed HER in the US, and released Razorblade Romance under that moniker. A settlement was eventually reached between the two parties, which allowed both to retain the name HIM.

== Reception ==
Professional ratings
Review scores
Source	Rating
AllMusic	2.5/5 stars
Blabbermouth.net	10/10
Helsingin Sanomat	Positive
Imperiumi.net	9+/10
Kerrang!	3/5 stars
Metal Hammer	8/10
Rock Hard	9/10
Rumba	8/10
Soundi	4/5 stars

Razorblade Romance received mostly positive reviews from critics. Borivoj Krgin of Blabbermouth.net gave the album ten out of ten, and called it "yet another amazingly crafted album from Europe's best-kept secret". He described the material as being the strongest he'd heard in years, singling out Valo's songwriting ability to blend "goth metal influences with mindlessly catchy pop melodies" as a "virtually unbeatable combination". Krgin also felt that the album's appeal would extend to a "much wider cross-section of the rock world" than many of the band's peers. Taavi Lindfors of Imperiumi.net called Razorblade Romance one of the milestones of Finnish heavy music, and awarded it a nine-plus out of ten. He singled out the songwriting and Valo's vocal delivery as particular highlights, and felt that nearly every song on the album had "the potential to be a hit".

Holger Stratmann of Rock Hard, who rated the album nine out of ten, praised HIM's ability to surpass their debut and their skill to write "simple, compact earworms". Particular praise was also given to Valo's vocals and Gas Lipstick's drumming, which were echoed by Antti Mattila of Soundi, who awarded the album four stars out of five. Mattila compared the material as being lighter and more accessible than the band's debut, and commended the album's production, remarking: "a sound this strong isn't created out of nothing". Rumba's Tero Valkonen gave Razorblade Romance eight out of ten, praising both the performances of the band and Valo, but noted the production as "playing it safe". Jarkko Jokelainen of Helsingin Sanomat was generally positive in his review of Razorblade Romance, giving praise to Valo's performance, but criticized some of the material backing him as sounding "flat". Antti J. Ravelin of AllMusic was mixed in his review, calling the album "over-produced" and awarding it two-and-a-half stars out of five. He did still commend the material and stated that "horrendous cliches in lyrics and playing don't really matter, because HIM recycles them well". He concluded by stating: "the songs as a whole are organized well, and it's easy to listen the album the whole way through."

In 2017, Valo revisited Razorblade Romance and called it the band's "success", stating: "With this record we created a gilded cage for ourselves. Something wonderful, that you're the captive of". Loudwire later ranked Razorblade Romance as HIM's best record and described it as "the definitive love metal album". KaaosZine felt similarly, ranking Razorblade Romance third in the band's discography, describing it as an album "full of vigorous pop songs, equipped catchy choruses".

In 2021, it was named one of the 20 best metal albums of 1999 by Metal Hammer magazine.

== Track listing ==
=== Original release ===
All tracks written by Ville Valo, except where noted.

No.	Title	Length
1.	"I Love You (Prelude to Tragedy)"	3:09
2.	"Poison Girl"	3:51
3.	"Join Me in Death"	3:36
4.	"Right Here in My Arms"	4:03
5.	"Gone with the Sin"	4:22
6.	"Razorblade Kiss"	4:18
7.	"Bury Me Deep Inside Your Heart"	4:16
8.	"Heaven Tonight"	3:18
9.	"Death Is in Love with Us"	2:58
10.	"Resurrection"	3:39
11.	"One Last Time"	5:10
Total length:		42:40

=== UK release ===
No.	Title	Writer(s)	Length
1.	"Your Sweet 666"		3:58
2.	"Poison Girl"		3:51
3.	"Join Me in Death"		3:37
4.	"Right Here in My Arms"		4:02
5.	"Bury Me Deep Inside Your Heart"		4:16
6.	"Wicked Game"	Chris Isaak	4:06
7.	"I Love You"		3:10
8.	"Gone with the Sin"		4:22
9.	"Razorblade Kiss"		4:20
10.	"Resurrection"		3:39
11.	"Death Is in Love with Us"		2:59
12.	"Heaven Tonight"		3:19
Total length:			45:39

=== US release ===
No.	Title	Writer(s)	Length
1.	"Your Sweet Six Six Six"		3:56
2.	"Poison Girl"		3:51
3.	"Join Me in Death"		3:36
4.	"Right Here in My Arms"		4:00
5.	"Bury Me Deep Inside Your Heart"		4:15
6.	"Wicked Game"	Chris Isaak	4:04
7.	"I Love You (Prelude to Tragedy)"		3:09
8.	"Gone with the Sin"		4:21
9.	"Razorblade Kiss"		4:18
10.	"Resurrection"		3:39
11.	"Death Is in Love with Us"		2:57
12.	"Heaven Tonight"		3:18
13.	"Sigillum Diaboli"		3:53
14.	"One Last Time"		5:08
Total length:			54:38

=== Limited edition bonus disc ===
No.	Title	Writer(s)	Length
1.	"Right Here in My Arms" (live)		5:39
2.	"Your Sweet 666" (live)		4:15
3.	"Poison Girl" (live)		3:45
4.	"Death Is in Love with Us" (live)		3:01
5.	"Wicked Game" (live)	Chris Isaak	6:24
6.	"Join Me in Death" (live)		6:25
Total length:			71:73

=== HER track listing ===
No.	Title	Writer(s)	Length
1.	"Your Sweet 666"		3:56
2.	"Poison Girl"		3:51
3.	"Join Me in Death"		3:36
4.	"Right Here in My Arms"		4:00
5.	"Bury Me Deep Inside Your Heart"		4:15
6.	"Wicked Game"	Chris Isaak	4:04
7.	"I Love You"		3:09
8.	"Gone with the Sin"		4:21
9.	"Razorblade Kiss"		4:18
10.	"Resurrection"		3:39
11.	"Death Is in Love with Us"		2:57
12.	"Heaven Tonight"		3:18
13.	"Sigillum Diaboli"		3:53
14.	"The 9th Circle (OLT)*"		5:09
15.	"One Last Time"		5:08
Total length:			60:98

- Only at the HER release (or the limited edition)

=== Remastered edition bonus disc (2014) ===
No.	Title	Length
1.	"I Love You" (TRNSFRMTN version)	4:20
2.	"Resurrection" (PRCX version)	3:45
3.	"Right Here in My Arms" (live at El Teatro Flores BS.AS.MMXIV)	4:10
4.	"Poison Girl" (Strongroom Sessions)	4:06
5.	"Bury Me Deep Inside Your Heart" (Strongroom Sessions)	4:14
6.	"Death Is in Love with Us" (live at Helldone SJK MMXIII)	3:19
7.	"Join Me in Death" (PRCX Version)	3:35
8.	"Gone with the Sin" (Strongroom Sessions)	4:23
Total length:		31:52

== Personnel ==
HIM

- Ville Valo − vocals
- Mikko "Linde" Lindström − guitars
- Mikko "Mige" Paananen − bass
- Jussi-Mikko "Juska" Salminen − keyboards
- Mika "Gas Lipstick" Karppinen − drums

Production

- John Fryer − production, engineering, mixing
- George Marino − mastering
- Jouko Lehtola − photography
- Tanja Savolainen − make-up
- Janne Uotila - artwork

== Charts ==
=== Weekly charts ===
Chart (2000–2015)	Peak position
Austrian Albums (Ö3 Austria)	1
Belgian Albums (Ultratop Flanders)	47
Dutch Albums (Album Top 100)	78
Finnish Albums (Suomen virallinen lista)	1
German Albums (Offizielle Top 100)	1
Hungarian Albums (MAHASZ)	25
Swiss Albums (Schweizer Hitparade)	8
US Heatseekers Albums (Billboard)	8
US Vinyl Albums (Billboard)	9

Chart (2026)	Peak position
Greek Albums (IFPI)	79
Scottish Albums (Official Charts)	50
UK Albums Sales (Official Charts)	65
UK Rock & Metal Albums (Official Charts)	10

=== Year-end charts ===
Chart (2000)	Position
Austrian Albums (Ö3 Austria)	15
European Albums (Music & Media)	36
German Albums (Offizielle Top 100)	7
Swiss Albums (Schweizer Hitparade)	41

== Certifications ==
Region	Certification	Certified units/sales
Austria (IFPI Austria)	Gold	25,000^{*}
Finland (Musiikkituottajat)	2× Platinum	101,036
Germany (BVMI)	3× Gold	450,000^{^}
Poland (ZPAV)	Gold	50,000^{*}
Switzerland (IFPI Switzerland)	Gold	25,000^{^}
United Kingdom (BPI)	Silver	60,000^{*}
^{*} Sales figures based on certification alone.^{^} Shipments figures based on certification alone.
