= Pretending (HIM song) =

Single by HIM

from the album Deep Shadows and Brilliant Highlights
- Released: July 2001
- Recorded: 2001
- Length: 3:54
- Label: BMG
- Songwriter: Ville Valo
- Producer: HIM

HIM singles chronology
| "Gone With the Sin" (2001) | "Pretending" (2001) | "In Joy and Sorrow" (2001) |

"Pretending" is a song by the Finnish band HIM, released in 2001 as the fifth track from their album Deep Shadows and Brilliant Highlights. It sold 7,641 copies in Finland.

In 2006, an acoustic version of "Pretending" was released as a double-A-side single along with the string version of "In Joy and Sorrow" on the album Uneasy Listening Vol. 1. The orchestral "In Joy and Sorrow" is the fifth track on the compilation, while the acoustic "Pretending" was an exclusive sixteenth track only available by buying the album from Best Buy. "In Joy and Sorrow"/"Pretending" reached No. 1 in Finland.

The first track on the international release is a shorter version than the official album version. The original version is 3:55 while the single version is 3:44.

== Track listing ==
International release and German and Finnish maxi-single release

1. "Pretending"
2. "Pretending" (alternative mix)
3. "Pretending" (The Cosmic Pope Jam version)
4. "Please Don't Let It Go" (acoustic version) *
5. "Lose You Tonight" (Caravan version) *

* – Only on the limited edition

Alternative release

1. "Lose You Tonight" (Caravan version)
2. "Please Don't Let It Go" (acoustic version)
3. "Pretending" (acoustic version)
4. "Pretending" (Cosmic Pope Jam version)

=== "In Joy and Sorrow"/"Pretending" double single ===
1. "In Joy and Sorrow" (string version)
2. "Pretending" (acoustic version)

== Charts ==
Chart performance for "Pretending"
| Chart (2001) | Peak position |
|---|---|
| Austria (Ö3 Austria Top 40) | 36 |
| Finland (Suomen virallinen lista) | 1 |
| Germany (GfK) | 10 |
| Spain (PROMUSICAE) | 4 |
| Switzerland (Schweizer Hitparade) | 32 |
