= Miljoona Rock =

Miljoona Rock was a rock festival in Tuuri held annually since 2004.

Tuuri is a village in Töysä, a municipality of Finland.

== Artists by year ==
2004

Scorpions, Leningrad Cowboys, Anssi Kela, Popeda, Miljoonasade, Jani Wickholm, Maija Vilkkumaa, Pizza Enrico

2005

Deep Purple, Jani Wickholm, Pelle Miljoona & Rockers, Kirka, Aino

2006

Lordi, Dio, Billy Idol, Normaali Homma!

2007

HIM, Scorpions, Eppu Normaali, Popeda, Neljä Ruusua, Jani Wickholm, Apulanta, Lauri Tähkä & Elonkerjuu, Normaali Homma!, Fakta Beat

2008

Nightwish, Twisted Sister, Jani Wickholm, Dingo, Movetron

2009

Viilto, Mustat Enkelit, Europe, Yö, Danny, Popeda, Paula Koivuniemi, Jani Wickholm, Scorpions, Eppu Normaali

2010

Lauri Tähkä & Elonkerjuu, The Rasmus, Herra Ylppö & Ihmiset, Kim Wilde, Alexander Rybak, Kivimetsän Druidi, D’Black, Dinturist, Mustat Enkelit, Hevisaurus

2011

Scorpions, Jenni Vartiainen, Negative, Flinch, Moottörin Jyrinä, Hevisaurus
