= Sara (band) =

Finnish music band

- Origin: Finland
- Genres: Rock, Metal
- Years active: 1995 – present
- Labels: Kråklund Records; Universal Records Finland (starting 2005)
- Members: Joa Korhonen; Tommi Koivikko; Antti Tuomivirta; Andreas Bäcklund; Kristian Udd
- Past members: Eetu Uusitalo; Martti Lindholm; Antti Pitkäjärvi; Niko Leminen
- Website: saranhuone.net

Sara is a Finnish alternative rock/metal band from Kaskinen established in the mid-1990s by Jorma Korhonen, Antti Tuomivirta, Tommi Koivikko and Kristian Udd. Drummer Eetu Uusitalo was added in 1997. The vocalist Joa Korhonen joined in after winning a talent contest and soon the band was signed to Kråklund Records. In 2005, and after Andreas Bäcklund joined the band in 2005, they were signed to Universal Records Finland

== Career ==
Their debut album Narupatsaat was released in 2000. Soon Eetu Uusitalo resigned and was replaced by Niko Leminen. The follow-up album Kromi successfully reached No. 9 on the Finnish Album Charts, followed by Saattue in 2003 after which the band went into a hiatus. After signing with Universal Finland in 2005, they released their album He kutsuivat luokseen 2006 and Veden äärelle in 2008. Their latest album Se keinuttaa meitä ajassa has proved their most successful making it to No. 4.

== Members ==
The band is made up of:

- Joa Korhonen (vocals and guitar)
- Tommi Koivikko (guitar)
- Antti Tuomivirta (guitar)
- Andreas Bäcklund (drums)
- Kristian Udd (bass)

Previous members

- Eetu Uusitalo (drums, 1997–2001)
- Martti Lindholm (keyboards 2000–2001)
- Antti Pitkäjärvi (keyboards, backing vocals 2001–2003)
- Niko Leminen (drums 2001–2005)

== Discography ==
=== Albums ===
Year	Album	Charts	Certification
Year	Album	FIN	Certification
2000	Narupatsaat	—	
2002	Kromi	9	
2003	Saattue	27	
2006	He kutsuivat luokseen	12	
2008	Veden äärelle	–	
2012	Se keinuttaa meitä ajassa	4	
2016	Solus	—	
2018	Summa	—	
2022	Pimeys	—	

=== Singles ===
Year	Single	Charts	Certification	Album
Year	Single	FIN	Certification	Album
2006	"Momentum"	4		
2002	Instrumental (EP)	17		

Other songs and videos

- 1999: "Silmiin & sydämiin"
- 2000: "Seuraa"
- 2001: "Tanssiin"
- 2002: "KSK"
- 2003: "Ylimäärä"
- 2006: "Momentum"
- 2006: "Vielä muodostan varjoni"
- 2006: "Huokaus"
- 2006: "Pyyhit vuodet kasvoiltasi"
- 2008: "Laine kerrallaan"
- 2008: "Rauhan aika"
- 2008: "Pitelet taivasta"
- 2008: "Kartta rinnassa"
- 2011: "Yhtenä iltana"
- 2012: "Se keinuttaa meitä ajassa"
