= Helldone =

Music festival

- Genre: Rock, heavy metal
- Locations: Tavastia Club; Helsinki, Finland
- Years active: 2005–2009, 2012–2015, 2017
- Founders: HIM

Helldone was an annual music festival organized by Finnish gothic rock band HIM. Typically held on 31 December at the Tavastia Club, and its companion club the Semifinal, in Helsinki, Finland, Helldone began in 1999 as an annual New Year's Eve show for HIM, which grew out of vocalist Ville Valo's "hatred for music parties" and need to "do something more than just get fucked up at midnight". The shows were expanded into a festival in 2005 and renamed Helldone after the band's booking agent Tiina Vuorinen, née Welldone, and their hometown of Helsinki. Helldone also took up a policy of named tickets, where attendees were required to provide identification matching their ticket upon entry to the venue.

In 2008, Helldone was expanded into a tour, which took the festival across Finland, before returning to Helsinki on New Year's Eve. Helldone took breaks in 2010 and 2011, partly due to HIM drummer Gas Lipstick's health issues, before returning in 2012. The festival took another break in 2016, due to the band members' other commitments. On 7 August 2017, HIM announced the return of Helldone for 31 December 2017, which would also serve as the band's final show before disbanding. Additional dates were later released going through 27 December to 30 December 2017 across Finland, including a show at the Helsinki Ice Hall.

Annually sold out and attended by people from around the world, Helldone hosted many bands over its tenure, including local artists such as The 69 Eyes, Swallow the Sun and Children of Bodom, as well as international acts like Cathedral, Anathema and Paradise Lost.

== Performers ==
=== 2005 ===
| 29 December | 30 December | 31 December |
| The 69 Eyes; Charon | Negative; Deep Insight; Bloodpit | HIM; Bleak; Underdøgs |

=== 2006 ===
| 29 December | 30 December | 31 December |
| Cathedral; Diablo; Blake | Amorphis; Anathema; 45 Degree Woman | HIM; Katatonia; Sara |

=== 2007 ===
| 29 December | 30 December | 31 December |
| Von Hertzen Brothers; Mokoma; Swallow the Sun; The Black League; Semifinal; Mannhai; Snipe Drive; Kings of Fools; Barbe-Q-Barbies | Fields of the Nephilim; Ajattara; Blake | HIM; The Skreppers |

=== 2008 ===
| 29 December | 30 December | 31 December |
| Stam1na; Diablo; Godsplague | The 69 Eyes; Negative; Sara | HIM; KYPCK; 45 Degree Woman |

| 29 December; Teatria, Oulu | 30 December; Pakkahuone and Klubi, Tampere |
| HIM; KYPCK; 45 Degree Woman | HIM; KYPCK; 45 Degree Woman |

=== 2009 ===
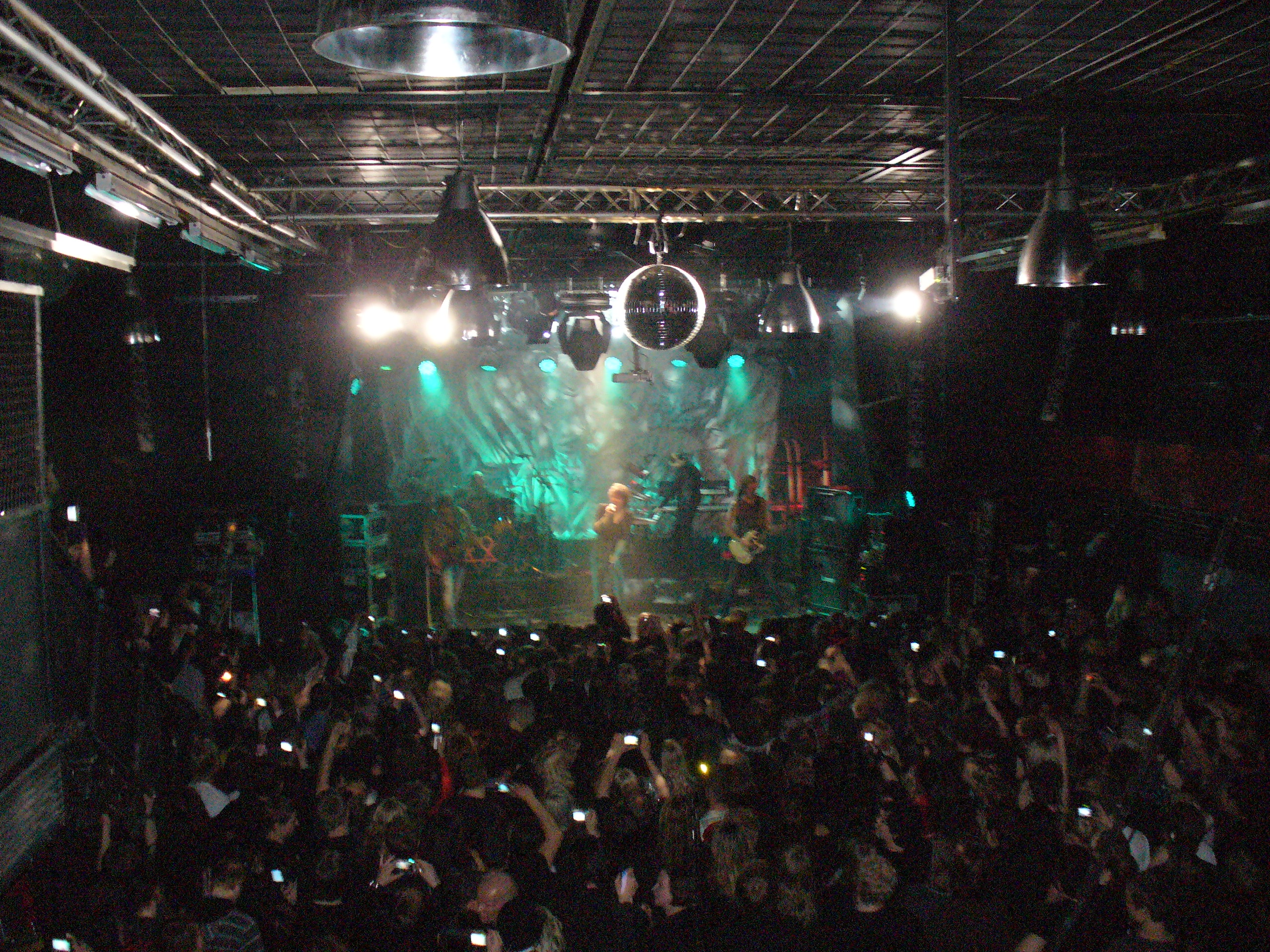
HIM performing at the Tavastia Club on 28 December 2009

| 28 December | 29 December | 30 December | 31 December |
| HIM; Fireal; Semifinal; The 69 Eyes | HIM; Ghost Brigade; Semifinal; The 69 Eyes | HIM; Vanity Beach; Semifinal; The 69 Eyes | HIM; Major Label; Semifinal; Anathema |

=== 2012 ===
| 28 December | 29 December | 30 December | 31 December |
| HIM; The Skreppers; Face of God; Semifinal; DJ Jyrki 69 | HIM; The Skreppers; Final Assault; Semifinal; DJ Jyrki 69 | HIM; The Skreppers; Semifinal; DJ Jyrki 69 | HIM; The Skreppers |

=== 2013 ===
| 28 December; Teatria, Oulu | 29 December; Rytmikorjaamo, Seinäjoki | 30 December; Pakkahuone, Tampere | 31 December; Tavastia, Helsinki |
| HIM; Pertti Kurikan Nimipäivät; Beastmilk; Odalisque | HIM; Pertti Kurikan Nimipäivät; Beastmilk; Odalisque | HIM; Pertti Kurikan Nimipäivät; Beastmilk; Odalisque | HIM; Pertti Kurikan Nimipäivät; Beastmilk; Odalisque |

=== 2014 ===
| 29 December | 30 December | 31 December |
| Paradise Lost; The 69 Eyes; Rambo Rimbaud | Children of Bodom; Reckless Love; Daniel Lioneye | HIM; Daniel Cavanagh; Kuolemanlaakso |

=== 2015 ===
| 29 December | 30 December | 31 December |
| HIM; At the Hollow; Semifinal; DJ Jussi 69 | HIM; At the Hollow; Semifinal; DJ Jussi 69 | HIM; At the Hollow; Semifinal; DJ Jussi 69 |

=== 2017 ===
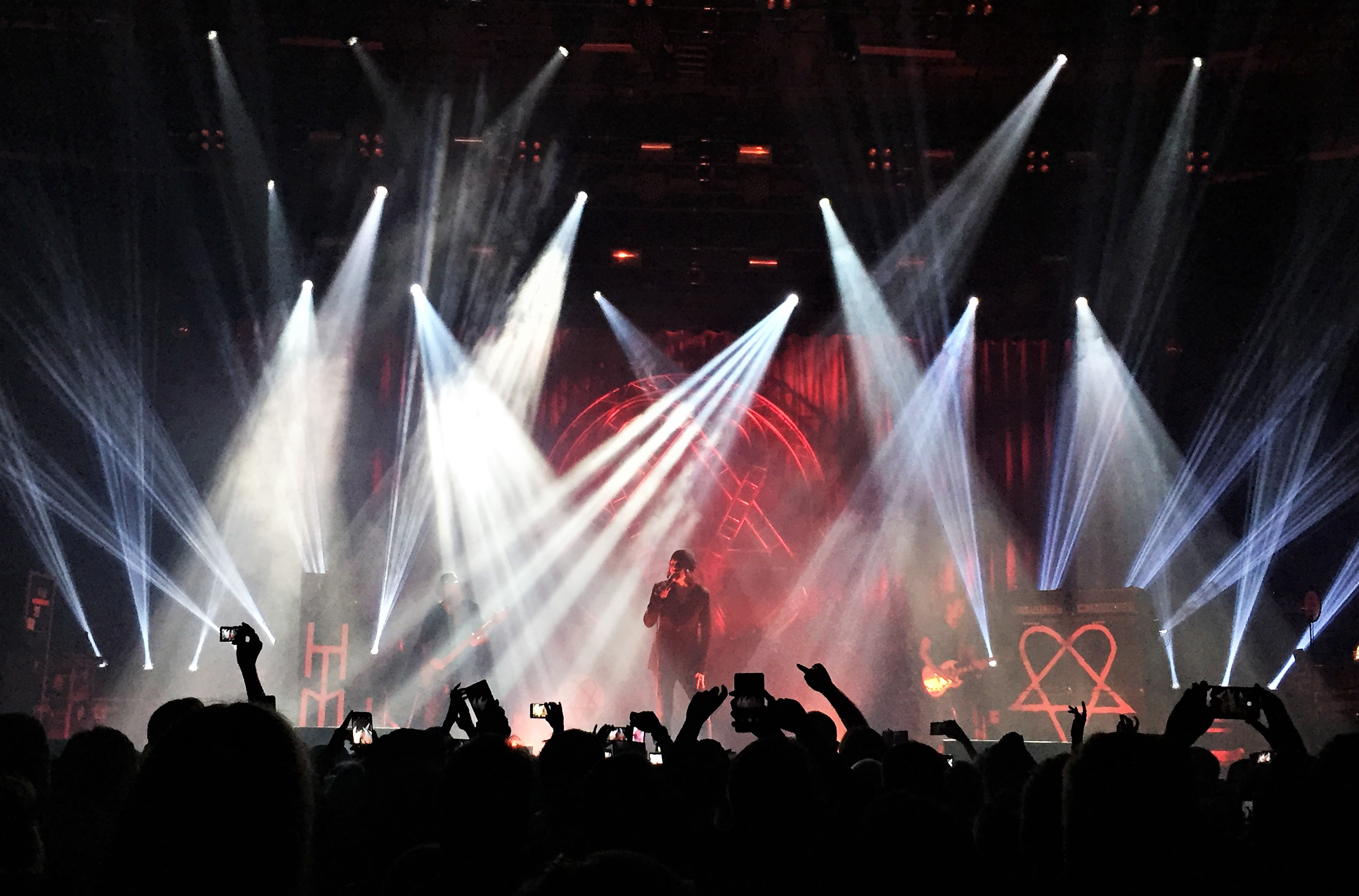
HIM performing at the Helsinki Ice Hall on 27 December 2017

| 27 December; Helsinki Ice Hall, Helsinki^{[a]} | 28 December; Terminaali Arena, Oulu | 29 December; Rytmikorjaamo, Seinäjoki | 30 December; Pakkahuone and Klubi, Tampere | 31 December; Tavastia, Helsinki |
| HIM; The 69 Eyes; Jimsonweed | HIM; Jimsonweed | HIM; Jimsonweed | HIM; Jimsonweed; Klubi; Delta Enigma | HIM; Jimsonweed |

• ^{^{^[a]}} In a smaller "Black Box" capacity
