= Suburban Tribe =

Finnish rock band

Promotional photo of the band

Suburban Tribe was a Finnish alternative rock/metal band. The band is notable for containing the members of two of Finland's best known thrash metal bands, Stone and Airdash. Bassist Janne Joutsenniemi played in the band Stone and guitarist Roope Siren played in Airdash.

In the beginning, the band's name was typed Sub-Urban Tribe, but it was changed to its present shape after a short break in 2001. The band got some publicity from TV series Big Brother. Their song "While the World Awaits" was played as theme song in season 2006. It was announced in March 2011 that the band has decided to disband.

== Band members ==
=== Final lineup ===
- Janne Joutsenniemi – bass (1994–2011), keyboards (1994–1997, 2001–2011)
- Roope Sirén – guitar (1994–2011)
- Alec Hirst-Gee – drums (1994–2011)
- Ville Tuomi – lead vocals (2000–2011)
- Euge Valovirta – guitar (2006–2011)

=== Former members ===
- Jouni Markkanen – lead vocals (1994–2000)
- Emerson Burton – keyboards (1997–2001), also ex-HIM

== Discography ==
=== Albums ===
- 1994 Primitive
- 1995 Purity
- 1997 Panorama
- 1998 Prime Time Collection
- 1998 Elektro 57
- 2001 Suburban Tribe
- 2004 Manimal
- 2006 Revolt Now!
- 2007 Recollection
- 2010 Now and Ever After
- 2011 Suburban Tribe (remaster/reissue)

=== Singles ===
- "Silence" (1994)
- "To and Fro" (1994)
- "One of My Little Memories" (1995)
- "Impossible" (1997)
- "First Spring Day" (1997)
- "Frequency" (1997)
- "Watching You" (2001)
- "Frozen Ashes" (2001)
- "Oil and Water" (2001)
- "Perfect Dark" (2002)
- "Untameable" (2003)
- "Silent Rain" (2004)
- "Nothingness" (2006)
- "Complications" (2006)
- "Nevermore" (2006)
- "While the World Awaits (2006)
- "Shock the Monkey" (2007)
- "Now and Ever After" (2010)
