= Join Me in Death =

1999 single by HIM

Single by HIM

from the album Razorblade Romance
- Released: 2 November 1999
- Length: 3:39
- Label: BMG Finland, Terrier
- Songwriter: Ville Valo
- Producer: John Fryer

HIM singles chronology
"Wicked Game" (1998)	"Join Me in Death" (1999)	"Right Here in My Arms" (2000)

Alternative cover
- The Thirteenth Floor single cover

"Join Me in Death" is a single by Finnish gothic rock band HIM, taken from their second studio album, Razorblade Romance (2000). It was also released under the condensed title of "Join Me". The song is the fifteenth-best-selling single of all time in Finland.

== Overview ==
HIM performed this song for the first time in Ilosaarirock, Finland, on 11 July 1998, which featured an extra verse not included in the studio versions.

The song has been met with controversy regarding its subject matter. "A couple of people blamed me for a suicide someone committed over here saying that 'Join Me' is an invitation to kill yourself," HIM frontman Ville Valo told the European magazine Metal Hammer in 2003. "What I was trying to do was sort of rip-off 'Don't Fear the Reaper' by Blue Öyster Cult, making a rock track of Romeo And Juliet." Lyrics such as "Would you die tonight for love?" have contributed to the misconception that the song is about suicide, which Valo denies, claiming the lyrics refer to giving things up for the sake of love. "It's not about suicide, that song. It's about giving it all away," Valo told the magazine Modern Fix.

Four versions of the song's video exist: three "lazer versions", two of which include different scenes from the movie The Thirteenth Floor, and the fourth being an "ice version", with a vague Romeo and Juliet theme also attributed to the song.

"Join Me In Death" was included in the film The Thirteenth Floor (though not on its soundtrack), on the Resident Evil: Apocalypse soundtrack in 2004. As well as the song included on Bam Margera’s skater recruitment video in Tony Hawk’s Underground video game. The band Gregorian covered "Join Me" with Sarah Brightman on their album Masters of Chant: Chapter III and on Brightman's Limited Edition The Harem Tour album. Another Gregorian version exists with vocals performed by Amelia Brightman.

== Track listings ==
Finnish and Australasian CD single

1. "Join Me" – 3:39
2. "Join Me" (13th Floor mix) – 3:39
3. "It's All Tears" (unplugged radio live) – 3:48
4. "Rebel Yell" (live version) – 5:12

European CD single

1. "Join Me in Death" – 3:39
2. "Rebel Yell" (live) – 5:12

German CD single

1. "Join Me" – 3:39
2. "It's All Tears" – 3:48
3. "Rebel Yell" – 5:12
4. "Dark Sekret Love" – 5:17
- Some versions of this format omit "Dark Sekret Love"

== Charts ==
=== Weekly charts ===
Chart (1999–2000)	Peak position
Austria (Ö3 Austria Top 40)	2
Belgium (Ultratop 50 Flanders)	37
Europe (Eurochart Hot 100)	11
Finland (Suomen virallinen lista)	1
Germany (GfK)	1
Italy (FIMI)	30
Netherlands (Dutch Top 40)	18
Netherlands (Single Top 100)	33
Romania (Romanian Top 100)	15
Spain (Promusicae)	15
Sweden (Sverigetopplistan)	52
Switzerland (Schweizer Hitparade)	8

=== Year-end charts ===
Chart (2000)	Position
Austria (Ö3 Austria Top 40)	40
Europe (Eurochart Hot 100)	80
Germany (Media Control)	19
Romania (Romanian Top 100)	99
Switzerland (Schweizer Hitparade)	79

== Certifications and sales ==
Region	Certification	Certified units/sales
Austria (IFPI Austria)	Gold	25,000^{*}
Finland (Musiikkituottajat)	Platinum	30,628
Germany (BVMI)	Gold	250,000^{^}
^{*} Sales figures based on certification alone.^{^} Shipments figures based on certification alone.

== Release history ==
Region	Date	Format(s)	Label(s)	Ref.
Germany	2 November 1999	CD	Supersonic; Terrier; BMG	
Finland	22 November 1999	CD	BMG Finland; Terrier	
Sweden	22 November 1999	CD	Supersonic; Terrier; BMG	

== See also ==
- List of best-selling singles in Finland
