= Gas Lipstick =

Swedish-Finnish drummer

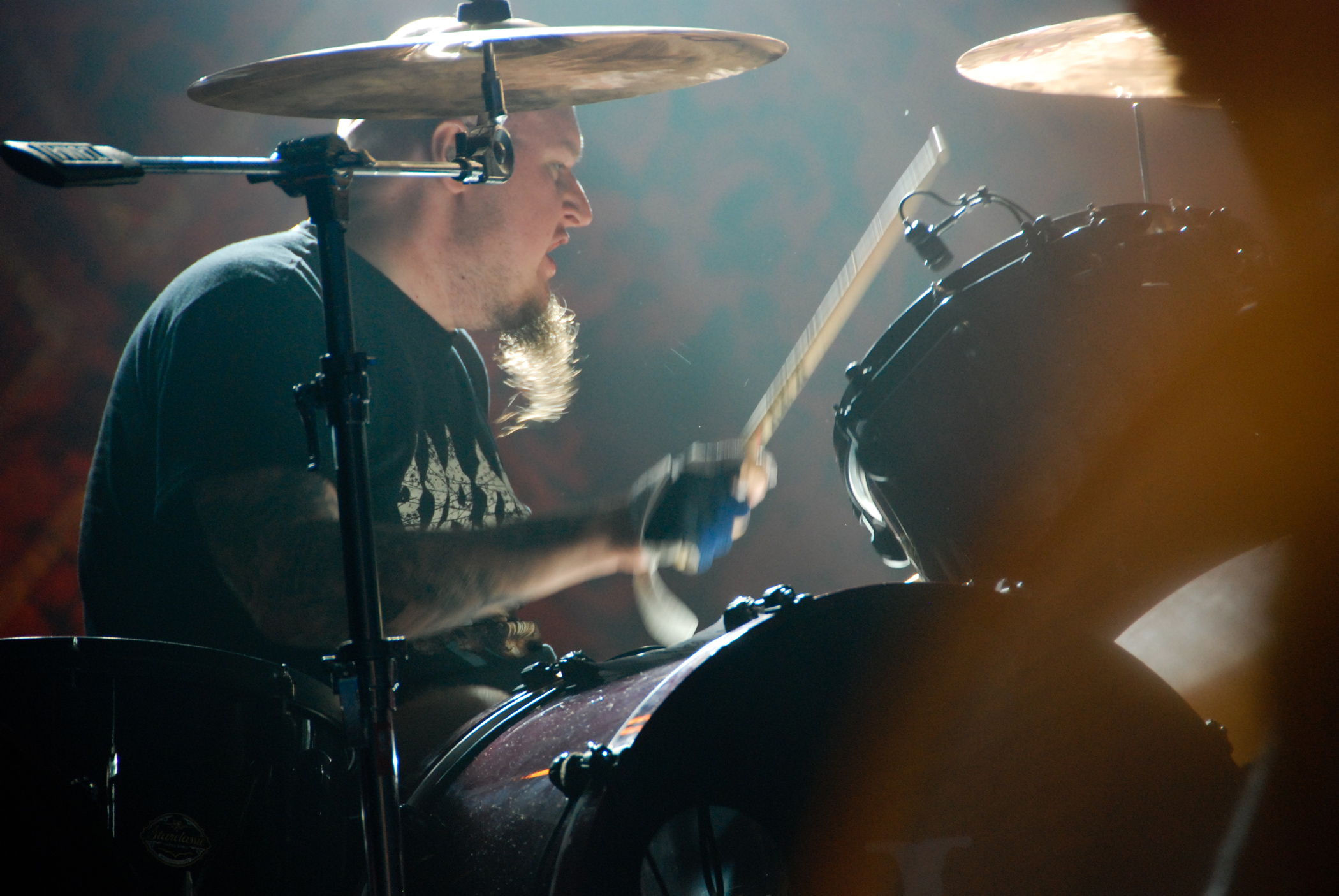
- Karppinen performing in 2007

Background information
- Also known as: Kaasu
- Born: Mika Kristian Karppinen; 8 February 1971 (age 54); Eskilstuna, Sweden
- Genres: Gothic rock; deathgrind; hardcore punk; heavy metal
- Occupation: Musician
- Instrument(s): Drums, vocals, guitar
- Years active: 1983–present

Mika Kristian Karppinen (born 8 February 1971), better known as Gas Lipstick, is a Swedish-Finnish musician, best known as the previous drummer of the Finnish gothic rock band HIM. He is also a drummer for other bands currently on hiatus, such as deathgrind group To Separate the Flesh from the Bones, heavy metal group Bendover, punk group Valvontakomissio, and punk group Ääritila.

== Biography ==
Born in Eskilstuna, Sweden to Finnish parents, Karppinen moved to Finland with his family at age 13. He was a session drummer for one tour with the Finnish band Tarot. Before joining HIM, he was also a member of Kyyria, which included Santeri Kallio and Niclas Etelävuori from the Finnish band Amorphis and singer Ville Tuomi of Suburban Tribe. He sang and played guitar in a thrash metal band called Dementia which featured guitarist Roope Latvala of Children of Bodom. He also was a drum tech for Stratovarius at one point and played on the Stratovarius DVD. He quit Flat Earth and started a Doom Metal band called Solitude together with Janne Parviainen of Ensiferum, Ville Pelkonen of Jimson Weed and singer Aleksi Parviainen. He plays guitar in a band for the first time since Dementia disbanded 1996. He recorded drums for pop/rock artists Leo Stillman's 3rd record that will be released in Spring 2023. Ääritila is currently working on a mini-LP and they are working on new songs.

In March 2011, the game company SongHi released an internet music game with Karppinen's drum loops.

In January 2015, Karppinen announced his departure from HIM, feeling that he needed to move on as a musician.

Karppinen married Croatian photographer and influencer Natali at Temppeliaukio church in Helsinki on 30 August 2008. It appears that the couple are no longer together.

== List of bands ==
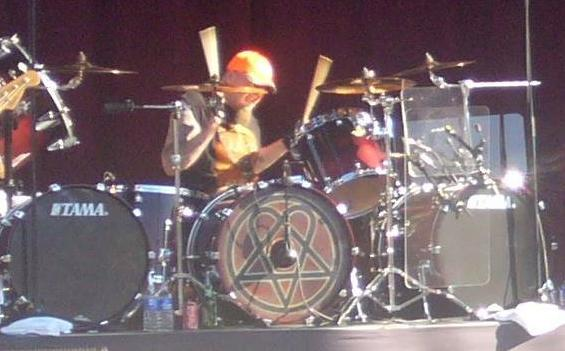
Gas Lipstick in 2007

- Valvontakomissio – vocals, composition, lyrics, drums (1984–present)
- Dischange – drums (1991)
- Kyyria – lyrics, composition, drums (1992–1998)
- Dementia – vocals, lyrics, composition, guitar (1986–1996)
- HIM – drums (1999–2015)
- Hallatar – drums (2016–present)
- We Sell the Dead – drums (2017–2018)
- Flat Earth – drums (2018–2022)
- Solitude – guitars (2022–present)

== Drum set ==
Gas is an endorser of Ludwig drums, Paiste cymbals, Aquarian drum heads and Vic Firth drum sticks. He is an open-handed drummer, meaning he plays the hi-hat with his left hand and the snare with his right, opposite to many rock drummers.

=== Drums ===
LUDWIG Legacy Classic (color: Black sparkle)

SHELL SIZES:

- 16" x 22" Bass Drum
- 6.5" x 14" Black Beauty Snare
- 12"x9" Rack Tom
- 14"x12" Rack Tom
- 16"x16" Floor Tom
- 16"x18" Floor Tom

HARDWARE: LUDWIG Atlas Pro

- 1 x Hi-Hat stand PRO LAP16HH
- 1 x Snare stand PRO LAP22SS
- 3 x Boom Cymbal Stand LAP37BCS
- 1 x Straight Cymbal Stand LAP27CS
- 1 x Drum Throne SADDLE LAP50TH
- 1 x Bass Drum Pedal LAP15FP
- 1 x Tom Holder Stand

CYMBALS: PAISTE

- 1 x 15" Big Beat Hi-hatt
- 1 x 18" Formula 602 Crash
- 1 x 19" Formula 602 Crash
- 1 x 20" Formula 602 Crash
- 1 x 22" Formula 602 Crash
- 1 x 22" Dark Crisp ride

Vic Firh American Classic Metal drum sticks

DRUM HEADS:

- Aquarian 12" Reflector black top head
- Aquarian 12" Classic clear bottom head
- Aquarian 14" Reflector black top head
- Aquarian 14" Classic Clear bottom head
- Aquarian 16" Reflector black top head
- Aquarian 16" Classic clear bottom head
- Aquarian 18" Reflector black top head
- Aquarian 18" Classic clear bottom head
- Aquarian 14" Hi-Energy top snare head
- Aquarian 14" Hi-Performance bottom snare head
- Aquarian 22" Force II bass drum eater head
