= The 69 Eyes discography =

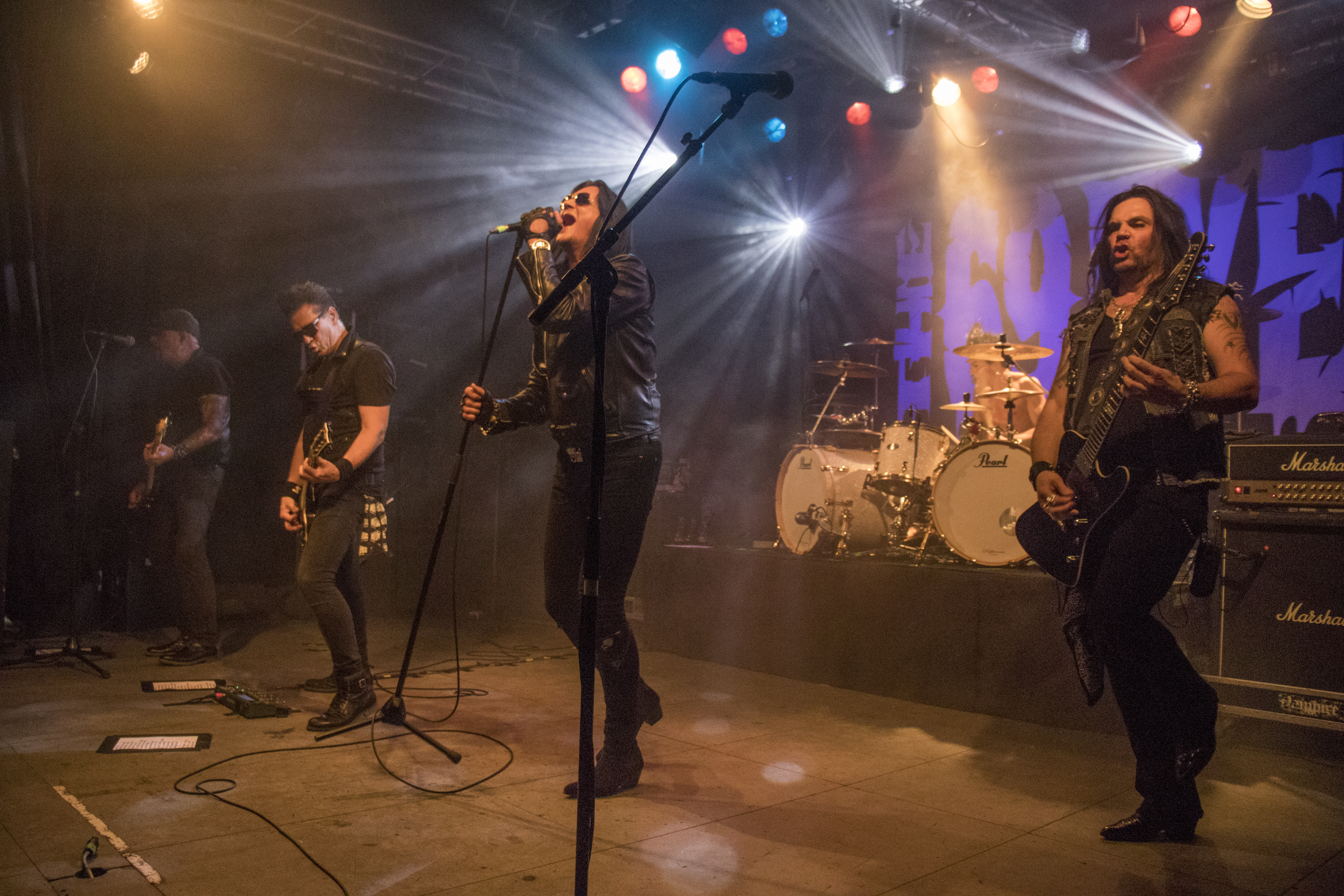
- The 69 Eyes in 2019
- Studio albums: 13
- Extended plays: 5
- Live albums: 2
- Compilation albums: 4
- Singles: 40
- Video albums: 2

This is the official discography and videography for the Finnish rock band The 69 Eyes. This page includes all studio albums as well as compilation and live albums. It also features the singles the band has released and the compilation albums they have been included in.

== Albums ==
=== Studio albums ===
List of studio albums, with selected details, chart positions and certifications
Title	Details	Peak chart positions				Certifications
Title	Details	FIN	AUT	GER	SWI	Certifications
Bump 'n' Grind	Released: 18 March 1992; Label: Gaga Goodies	—	—	—	—	
Savage Garden	Released: 10 April 1995; Label: Gaga Goodies	—	—	—	—	
Wrap Your Troubles in Dreams	Released: 10 February 1997; Label: Gaga Goodies	—	—	—	—	
Wasting the Dawn	Released: 22 February 1999; Label: Gaga Goodies	24	—	—	—	
Blessed Be	Released: 22 September 2000; Label: Gaga Goodies	4	—	—	—	FIN: Gold
Paris Kills	Released: 23 April 2002; Label: Woimasointu	1	—	35	—	FIN: Platinum
Devils	Released: 25 October 2004; Label: EMI Music Finland	1	—	91	—	
Angels	Released: 28 February 2007; Label: Virgin	1	66	46	—	
Back in Blood	Released: 26 August 2009; Label: Nuclear Blast	3	—	32	87	
X	Released: 28 September 2012; Label: Nuclear Blast	4	—	47	89	
Universal Monsters	Released: 22 April 2016; Label: Nuclear Blast	2	—	46	58	
West End	Released: 13 September 2019; Label: Nuclear Blast	2	—	38	—	
Death of Darkness	Released: 21 April 2023; Label: Nuclear Blast	3	—	26	29	
"—" denotes a recording that did not chart or was not released in that territory.

=== Compilation albums ===
List of compilation albums, with selected details, chart positions and certifications
Title	Details	Peak chart positions	Certifications
Title	Details	FIN	Certifications
Motor City Resurrection	Released: 1994; Label: Gaga Goodies	—	
Framed in Blood – The Very Blessed of	Released: 2003; Label: Gaga Goodies	6	FIN: Gold
Angels/Devils	Released: 2007; Label: Virgin	—	
Goth N' Roll	Released: 2008; Label: Gaga Goodies	18	
The Best of Helsinki Vampires	Released: 2013; Label: Nuclear Blast	13	
"—" denotes a recording that did not chart or was not released in that territory.

=== Live albums ===
List of live albums, with selected details and chart positions
Title	Details	Peak chart positions
Title	Details	FIN
The 69 Eyes: Hollywood Kills Live at the Whiskey a Go Go	Released: 2008; Label: Virgin	19

=== Video albums ===
- Helsinki Vampires (2003)

== Extended plays ==
- High Times, Low Life (1992)
- Music for Tattooed Ladies & Motorcycle Mamas Vol. 1 (1993)
- Never Too Loud! (1994)
- Velvet Touch (1995)
- Supershow (split with Backyard Babies) (1996)
- Drive (2022)

== Singles ==
List of singles, with selected chart positions, showing year released and album name
Title	Year	Peak chart positions	Album
Title	Year	FIN	Album
"Sugarman"	1990	—	Bump 'n' Grind
"Barbarella"	1991	—	Bump 'n' Grind
"Juicy Lucy"	1992	—	Bump 'n' Grind
"Deuce"	1994	—	Motor City Resurrection
"Wasting the Dawn"	1999	5	Wasting the Dawn
"Gothic Girl"	1999	10	Blessed Be
"Brandon Lee"	2001	2	Blessed Be
"The Chair"	2001	2	Blessed Be
"Stolen Season"	2001	6	Blessed Be
"Dance D'amour"	2001	1	Paris Kills
"Betty Blue"	2002	5	Paris Kills
"Crashing High"	2003	5	Paris Kills
"Lost Boys"	2004	1	Devils
"Devils"	2004	2	Devils
"Feel Berlin"	2005	5	Devils
"Sister of Charity"	2005	7	Devils
"Perfect Skin"	2007	1	Angels
"Never Say Die"	2007	11	Angels
"Rocker"	2007	—	Angels
"Ghost"	2007	—	Angels
"Dead Girls Are Easy"	2009	—	Back in Blood
"Red"	2012	—	X
"Borderline"	2012	—	X
"Love Runs Away"	2012	—	X
"Lost Without Love"	2013	—	The Best of Helsinki Vampires
"Jet Fighter Plane" / "Dolce Vita"	2016	—	Universal Monsters
"Jerusalem"	2016	—	Universal Monsters
"Christmas in New York City"	2017	—	Non-album single
"27 & Done"	2019	—	West End
"Cheyenna"	2019	—	West End
"Black Orchid"	2019	—	West End
"Two Horns Up"	2019	—	West End
"Drive"	2022	—	Death of Darkness
"Call Me Snake"	2022	—	Death of Darkness
"California"	2022	—	Death of Darkness
"Gotta Rock"	2022	—	Death of Darkness
"Aloha from Hell"	2023	—	Non-album singles
"Feuer Frei!"	2023	—	Non-album singles
"Fade to Gray"	2024	—	Non-album singles
"—" denotes a recording that did not chart or was not released in that territory.

=== Promotional singles ===
List of promotional singles, showing year released and album name
Title	Year	Album
"Call Me"	1997	Wrap Your Troubles in Dreams
"Dead N' Gone"	2009	Back in Blood
"Kiss Me Undead"	2010	Back in Blood
"Tonight"	2013	X
"Rosary Blue" (ft. Kat Von D)	2013	Non-album single

== Other appearances ==
List of songs, showing year released and album name
Title	Year	Album
"Science Gone to Far!"	1996	Dictators Forever, Forever Dictators
"Gimme Some Skin"	1996	I Wanna Be a Stooges
"Return of the Fly"	1996	Hell on Earth
"Vietnamese Baby"	1997	Stranded in the Doll's House
"Wasting the Dawn"	1999	Orkus Presents the Best of 1999
"Wasting the Dawn"	1999	Sonic Seducer – Like a Taste of Sin!
"Gothic Girl"	2000	Orkus Presents the Best of 2000
"Lost Boys"	2005	Viva La Bands
