= Jyrki 69 =

Finnish singer

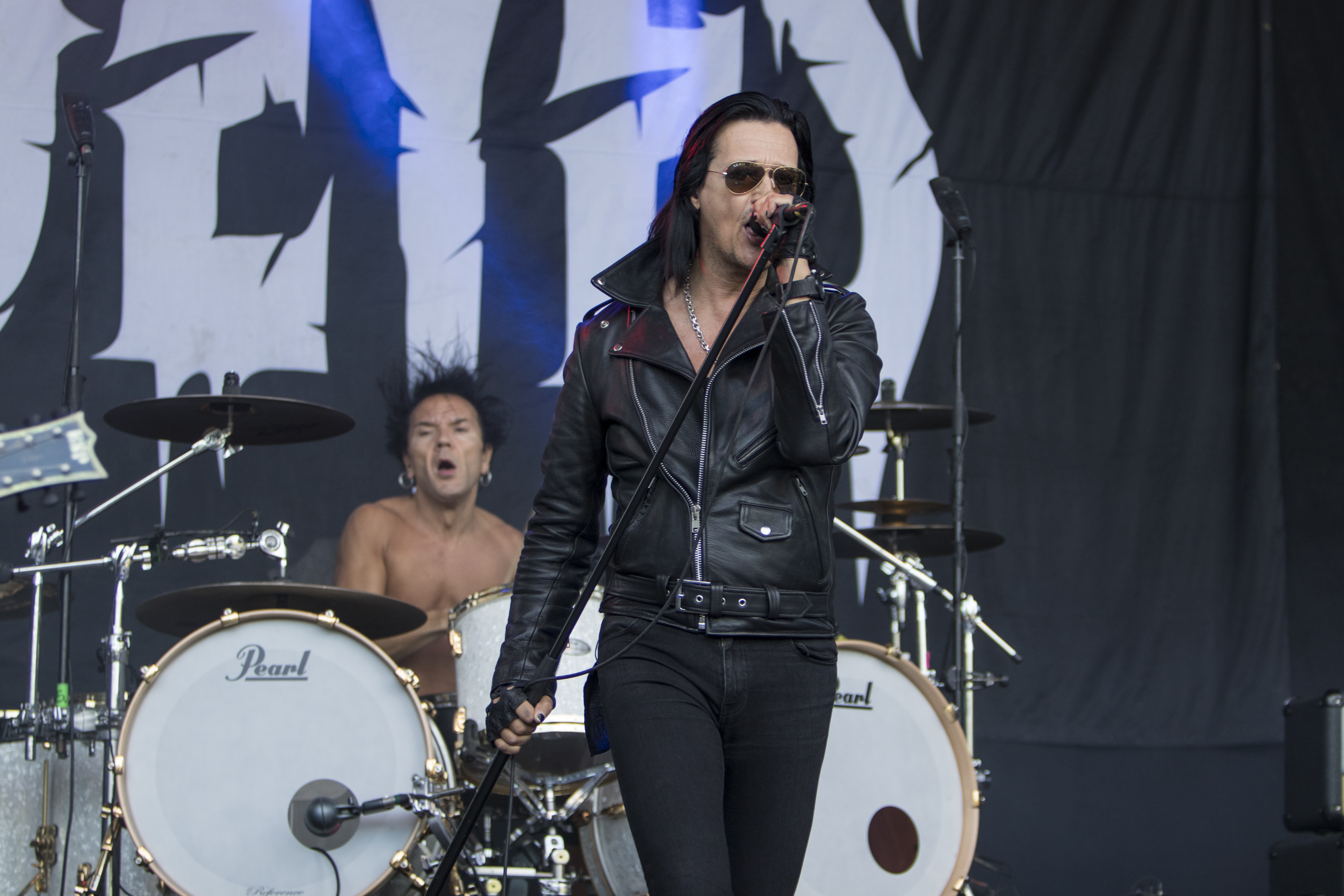

Background information
- Also known as: J. Darling
- Born: Jyrki Pekka Emil Linnankivi; 15 October 1968; Helsinki, Finland
- Genres: Gothic rock; glam metal (early)
- Occupations: Singer; songwriter
- Years active: 1989–present
- Member of: The 69 Eyes; The 69 Cats

Jyrki Pekka Emil Linnankivi (born 15 October 1968), known professionally as Jyrki 69, is a Finnish singer who is the lead vocalist of the rock band The 69 Eyes. In their early years, the band's sound was closer to glam metal, but since the album Blessed Be they have shifted into gothic rock. The 69 Eyes prefer to label their sound as "goth'n'roll".

Jyrki's low and operatic bass-baritone vocal tone is reminiscent of fellow musicians Peter Steele of the gothic metal band Type O Negative and Andrew Eldritch of the gothic rock band The Sisters of Mercy (he covered their 1987 hit "This Corrosion" with Maryslim in 2007). His voice has been influenced by Elvis Presley, Jim Morrison, Iggy Pop, David Bowie and Glenn Danzig. He has written most of the lyrics of their songs.

== Music career ==
In 1996, Jyrki joined forces with Claude, the lead singer of the legendary Finnish rock band Smack to form a side project The Fellow Reptiles. They released an EP "Yours Truly" and had plans for an album of duets, but the Fellow Reptiles broke up, when Claude died suddenly on September 22, 1996.

In 2002, Jyrki appeared on Kwan's album The Die Is Cast, performing vocals on the track "Lyrics of Poison".

On Maryslim's 2007 album A Perfect Mess, Jyrki provided guest vocals on their cover of The Sisters of Mercy's "This Corrosion" and also appeared in the music video for the track.

In October 2013, Jyrki joined forces with Danny B. Harvey and Chopper Franklin to form the rock band The 69 Cats. The group released their debut album Transylvanian Tapes in August 2014.

In 2015, Jyrki collaborated with Los Angeles based Heathen Apostles on the gothic country 4 track Evil Spirits EP.

== Other activities ==
Jyrki was UNICEF Goodwill Ambassador for Finland from 2005 to 2026. In 2005 and 2006, he spent time in Kenya and helped campaign against HIV-AIDS situation in the country and against child trafficking and sexual exploitation in parts of West Africa.

In 2006, he was honoured with a TOYP award by Junior Chamber International (JCI) in Seoul, South Korea.

He draws and reads comics specializing in Marvel Comics. A comic book called Zombie Love, featuring only Jyrki's comics, was published in Finland in 2006. It was a limited hard cover edition of 1,000 and all the copies were numbered by Jyrki. Number 666 was given to Glenn Danzig. A paperback edition is still available from the publisher Deggael Communications.

He has been vegan since 2014.

In 2024, he was awarded a Tapaseura ry award which is given to adult role models who encourage their fellow people to be considerate of others and behave in a positive way.

Jyrki Linnankivi is currently enrolled at the University of Helsinki studying theology.

In April 2026, he was featured in the Finnish Documentary Jyrki 69: pimeydestä valoon (English translation: Jyrki 69: from darkness to light) which documents his work as a priest-in-training at a church within the Finnish municipality of Utsjoki.

== Recording history ==
- Bump 'n' Grind (1992)
- Motor City Resurrection (1994)
- Savage Garden (1995)
- Wrap Your Troubles in Dreams (1997)
- Wasting the Dawn (1999)
- Blessed Be (2000)
- Paris Kills (2002)
- Framed in Blood – The Very Blessed of the 69 Eyes (2003)
- Devils (2004)
- Angels (2007)
- Angels/Devils (2008)
- The 69 Eyes: Hollywood Kills (2008)
- Goth'N'Roll box set (2008)
- Back in Blood (2009)
- X (2012)
- The Best of Helsinki Vampires (2013)
- Transylvanian Tapes (2014) (with The 69 Cats)
- Universal Monsters (2016)
- Helsinki Vampire (2017) (solo album)
- Black Parade (2018) (with Musta Paraati)
- West End (2019) (The 69 Eyes)
- Seven Year Itch (2021) (with The 69 Cats)
- American Vampire (2021) (solo album)
- Death of Darkness (2023)
