= Jussi 69 =

Finnish drummer

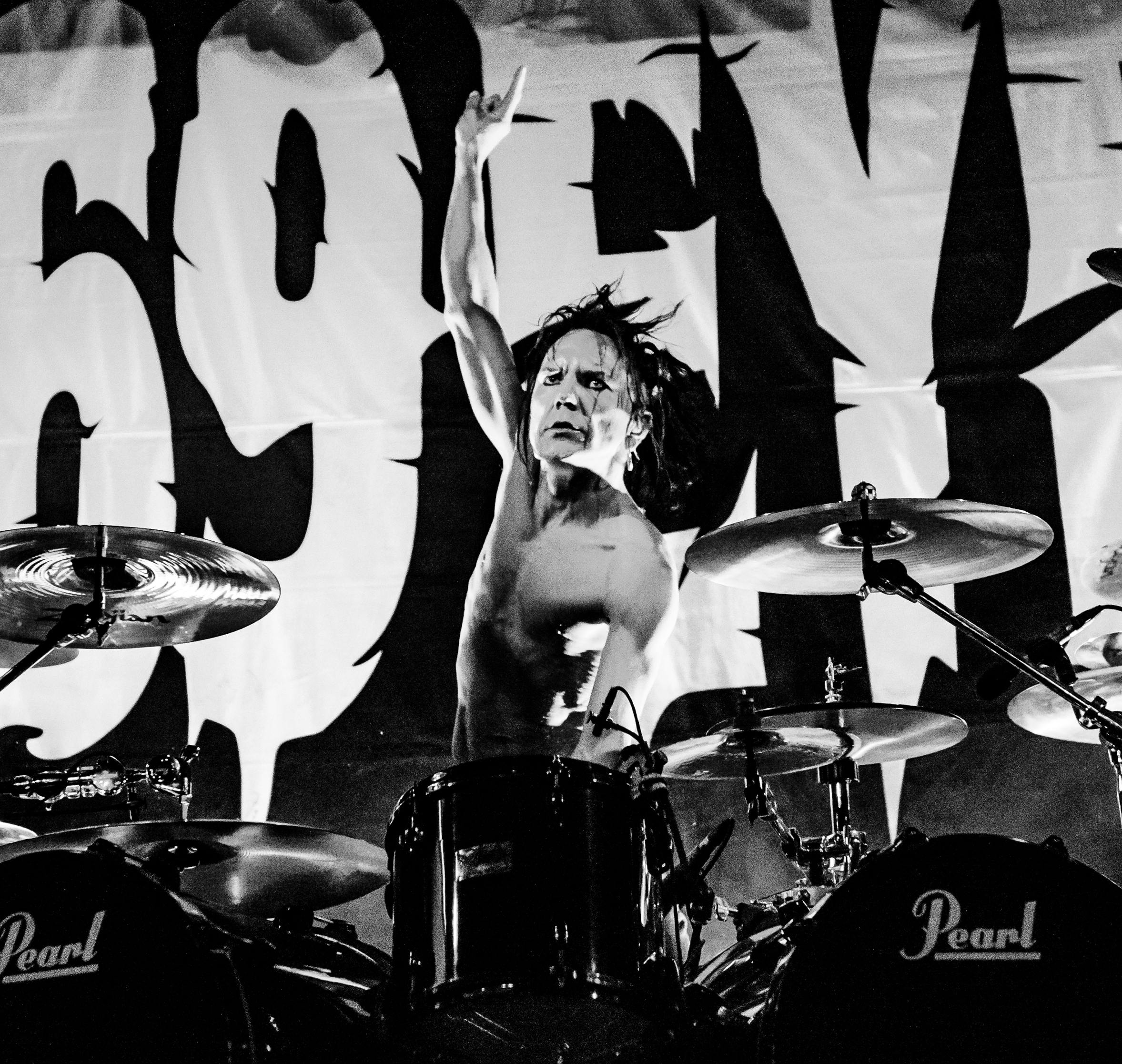
- Jussi 69 with The 69 Eyes in 2016

Background information
- Born: 11 July 1972 (age 52); Helsinki, Finland
- Genres: Gothic rock, glam metal, hard rock
- Occupation: Drummer
- Years active: 1989–present
- Member of: The 69 Eyes, The Local Band
- Website: 69eyes.com

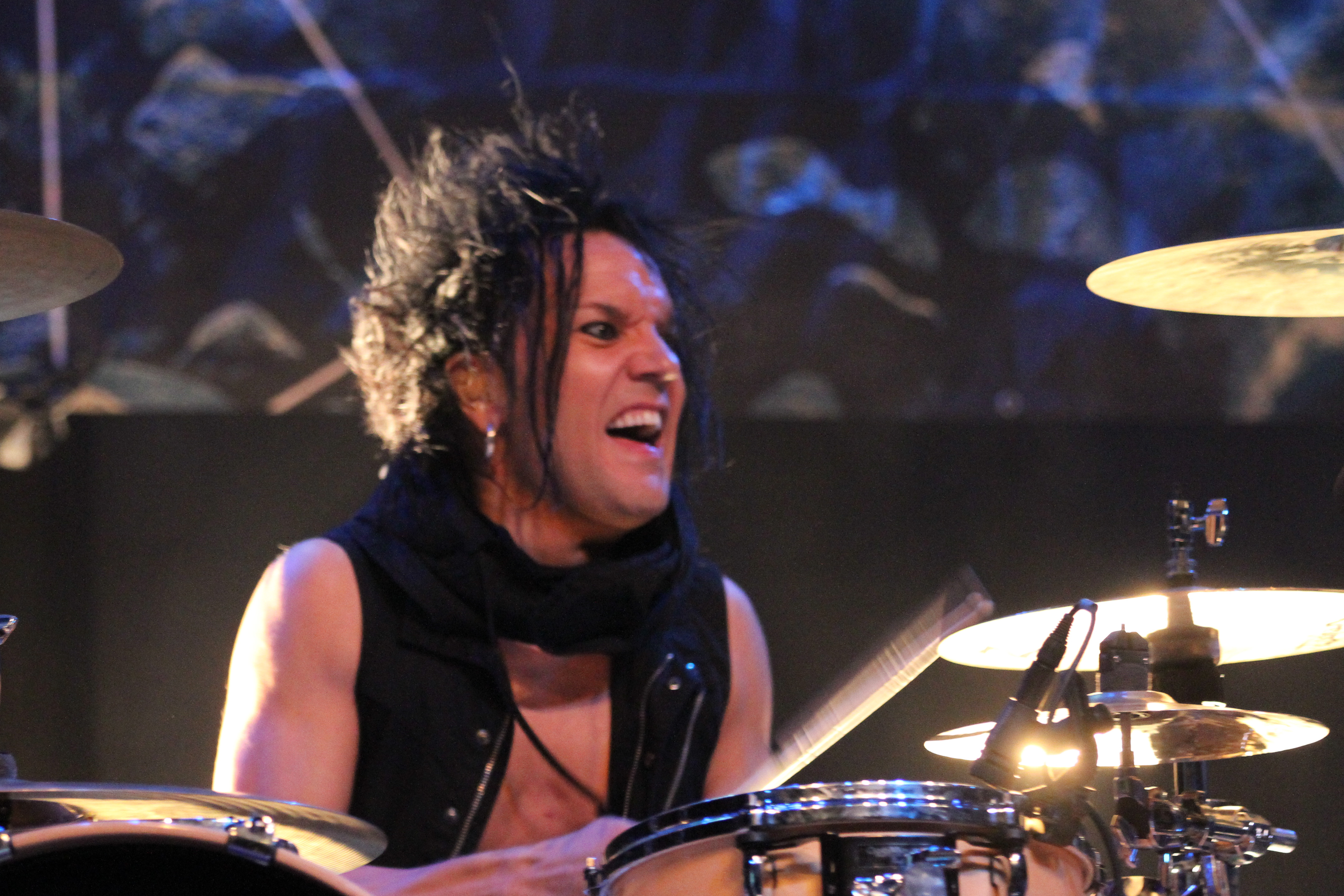
Jussi 69 (Wave-Gotik-Treffen 2013)

Jussi Heikki Tapio Vuori (born 11 July 1972), better known as Jussi 69, is the drummer for the Finnish rock band The 69 Eyes. He is best known for his flamboyant playing style; his kit is set up low to allow for the maximum exposure of his on-stage antics. His drumming relies primarily on cymbal flourishes rather than pure drum fills to transition between sections of a song. He appeared in an episode of Viva La Bam and in the film Bam Margera Presents: Where the ♯$&% Is Santa?.

== Recording history ==
=== The 69 Eyes ===
- Bump 'n' Grind (1992)
- Motor City Resurrection (1994)
- Savage Garden (1995)
- Wrap Your Troubles in Dreams (1997)
- Wasting the Dawn (1999)
- Blessed Be (2000)
- Paris Kills (2002)
- Framed in Blood – The Very Blessed of the 69 Eyes (2003)
- Devils (2004)
- Angels (2007)
- The 69 Eyes: Hollywood Kills (2008)
- Back in Blood (2009)
- Х (2012)
- Universal Monsters (2016)
- West End (2019)
- Death of Darkness (2023)

=== Briard ===
- Briard (Revisited) (1996) session drums
