= Ville Valo discography =

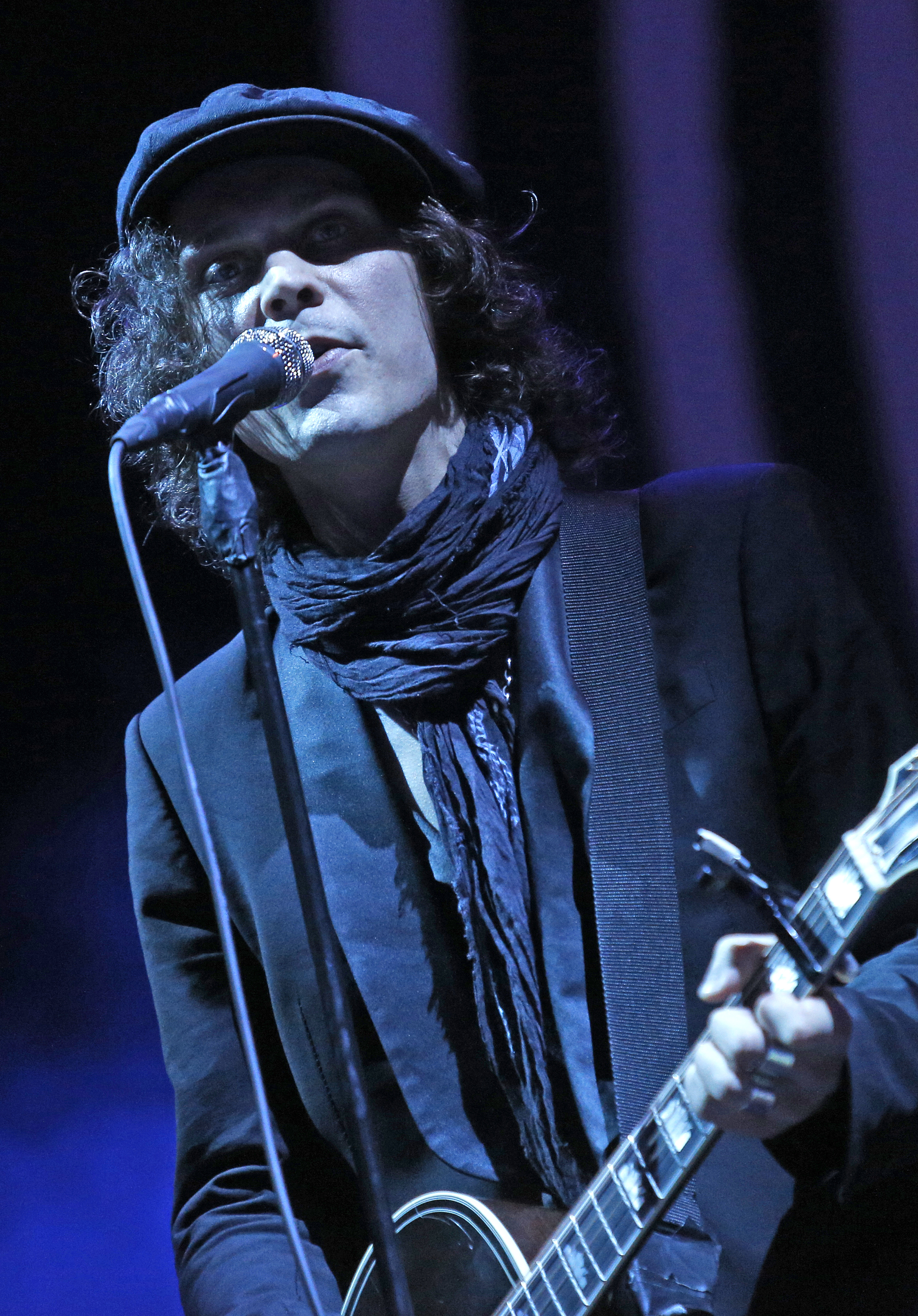
- Ville Valo performing in 2013
- Studio albums: 1
- EPs: 1
- Singles: 10
- Music videos: 5
- Collaboration albums: 1

The solo discography of Finnish singer, songwriter and musician Ville Valo consists of one studio album, one collaboration album, one extended play, ten singles and four music videos. He has also made several guest appearances on other artists' releases.

Valo began his career in the early 1990s playing in several local bands around Helsinki, Finland. In 1991, he formed HIM, which would go on to become one of the most successful Finnish bands of all time. HIM released eight studio albums over the course of its career, before disbanding in 2017. Valo was also a member of Daniel Lioneye, a side project formed by Valo along with fellow HIM members Linde Lindström and Mige.

Concurrent to his career in HIM, Valo made several guest appearances on releases by other artists, including The 69 Eyes, Anathema, Andy McCoy, Apocalyptica, Bloodhound Gang, Cradle of Filth, Jeff Walker, Lullacry, MGT, The Mission and Tehosekoitin. In 2007, Valo and German actress-singer Natalia Avelon released a cover version of Lee Hazlewood's "Summer Wine", which charted at number one in Finland and Greece, as well as number two in Germany and Switzerland. The single was later certified platinum in Finland and Germany. In 2016, Valo released a cover version of "Olet mun kaikuluotain" (a Finnish version of John Denver's "Annie's Song") to celebrate the 50th anniversary of Love Records. The single reached number one on the Finnish Digital Song Sales Chart.

In 2018, Valo teamed up with Finnish schlager group Agents to record songs by late Finnish singer-songwriter Rauli "Badding" Somerjoki. Valo had previously worked with the group in 1999, when he appeared as guest vocalist on the television show Laulava sydän. Ville Valo & Agents released their self-titled album on 15 February 2019. It debuted at number one on the Finnish Albums Chart and was certified gold in less than a week. In 2020, Valo embarked on a solo career with the release of the EP Gothica Fennica Vol. 1, which was released under the moniker VV. Two of its three tracks charted on the Finnish Radio Airplay Chart. In April 2022, Valo released "Loveletting", the first single from his debut solo album. Neon Noir was released on 13 January 2023 and it charted in six countries, debuting at number one in Finland and number four in Germany.

== Albums ==
=== Studio albums ===
Title	Album details	Peak chart						Certifications
Title	Album details	FIN	AUT	BEL	GER	SPA	SWI	Certifications
Neon Noir	Released: 13 January 2023; Label: Heartagram / Spinefarm / Universal Music	1	13	187	4	34	19	

=== Collaboration albums ===
Title	Album details	Peak chart	Certifications
Title	Album details	FIN	Certifications
Ville Valo & Agents (with Agents)	Released: 15 February 2019; Label: Vallila Music House	1	FIN: Gold

== EPs ==
Title	EP details	Peak chart
Title	EP details	FIN
Gothica Fennica Vol. 1	Released: 20 March 2020; Label: Heartagram	—
"—" denotes a release that did not chart.

== Singles ==
=== As lead artist ===
Year	Song	Peak chart positions						Certifications	Album
Year	Song	FIN	AUT	DNK	GER	GRE	SWI	Certifications	Album
2007	"Summer Wine" (with Natalia Avelon)	1	4	11	2	1	2	FIN: Platinum; GER: Platinum	
2016	"Olet mun kaikuluotain"	1^{[a]}	—	—	—	—	—		
2018	"Orpolapsi kiurun" (with Agents)	3^{[a]}	—	—	—	—	—		Ville Valo & Agents
2019	"Ikkunaprinsessa" (with Agents)	42^{[b]}	—	—	—	—	—		Ville Valo & Agents
2020	"Run Away from the Sun"	24^{[b]}	—	—	—	—	—		Gothica Fennica Vol. 1
2020	"Salute the Sanguine"	57^{[b]}	—	—	—	—	—		Gothica Fennica Vol. 1
2022	"Loveletting"	20^{[b]}	—	—	—	—	—		Neon Noir
2022	"Echolocate Your Love"	32^{[b]}	—	—	—	—	—		Neon Noir
2022	"The Foreverlost"	—	—	—	—	—	—		Neon Noir
2023	"Neon Noir"	47^{[b]}	—	—	—	—	—		Neon Noir
"—" denotes releases that did not chart

=== As a featured artist ===
Year	Song	Peak chart positions					Album
Year	Song	FIN	AUT	GER	SWE	SWI	Album
2004	"Bittersweet" (Apocalyptica, featuring Ville Valo and Lauri Ylönen)	1	11	6	53	8	Apocalyptica
2007	"Just for Tonight" (Manna, featuring Ville Valo)	—	—	—	—	—	Sister
2016	"Lusifer" (Teho Majamäki, featuring Ville Valo)	—	—	—	—	—	Travelogue
2016	"Knowing Me, Knowing You" (MGT, featuring Ville Valo)	10^{[a]}	—	—	—	—	Volumes
2016	"Xmas Song" (Andy McCoy, featuring Ville Valo)	—	—	—	—	—	
2023	"Temple of Love" (Black Veil Brides, featuring VV)	—	—	—	—	—	
"—" denotes releases that did not chart

Notes

- ^{^{^[a]}} Peaked on the Finnish Digital Song Sales Chart
- ^{^{^[b]}} Peaked on the Finnish Radio Airplay Chart

== Music videos ==
=== As lead artist ===
Year	Song	Director	Ref.
2007	"Summer Wine" (Ville Valo and Natalia Avelon)	Sven Sindt	
2016	"Olet mun kaikuluotain"	Ykä Järvinen	
2022	"Loveletting"	Kim Koponen	
2022	"Echolocate Your Love"	Kim Koponen	
2023	"Neon Noir"	Kim Koponen	

=== As a featured artist ===
Year	Song	Director	Ref.
2004	"Bittersweet" (Apocalyptica, featuring Ville Valo and Lauri Ylönen)	Antti J. Jokinen	
2016	"Knowing Me, Knowing You" (MGT, featuring Ville Valo)	Ville Juurikkala	
2016	"Xmas Song" (Andy McCoy, featuring Ville Valo)	Pete Veijalainen	

== Other appearances ==
=== Release contributions ===
Year	Song	Album	Ref.
2000	"Valo yössä"	Tuomarin todistajat	
2006	"Kun minä kotoani läksin"	Synkkien laulujen maa	
2006	"Täällä Pohjantähden alla" (with Kari Tapio)	Synkkien laulujen maa	

=== Guest appearances ===
Year	Song	Artist	Album	Credits	Ref.
1993	"Abdullah"	Donits-Osmo Experience	Monk Rock	Bass	
1993	"Cypress Creek"	Donits-Osmo Experience	Captain Demo	Bass	
1993	"Kill Fuck"	Donits-Osmo Experience	Captain Demo	Bass	
1997	—N/a	The 69 Eyes	Wrap Your Troubles in Dreams	Backing vocals	
1999	"Lay Down Your Arms"	The 69 Eyes	Wasting the Dawn	Backing vocals	
1999	"Wasting the Dawn"	The 69 Eyes	Wasting the Dawn	Backing vocals	
1999	"Lazarus Heart"	The 69 Eyes	Wasting the Dawn	Backing vocals	
1999	"All-American Dream"	The 69 Eyes	Wasting the Dawn	Backing vocals	
1999	"Hand of God"	The 69 Eyes	Wasting the Dawn	Backing vocals	
1999	"Paratiisi"	Agents	Laulava sydän	Lead vocals	
1999	"Jykevää on rakkaus"	Agents	Laulava sydän	Lead vocals	
1999	"Ikkunaprinsessa"	Agents	Laulava sydän	Lead vocals	
1999	—N/a	Tehosekoitin	Freak Out	Backing vocals	
2000	—N/a	The 69 Eyes	Blessed Be	Backing vocals	
2001	"The Prostitute"	Five Fifteen	Death of a Clown	Backing vocals	
2001	"Season of the Witch"	Five Fifteen	Death of a Clown	Backing vocals	
2001	"Sweet Little Dreamer"	Five Fifteen	Death of a Clown	Backing vocals	
2002	"TV Ass"	The Skreppers	Hedonist Hellcats	Backing vocals	
2002	"She's Not Mine"	The Skreppers	Hedonist Hellcats	Backing vocals	
2002	—N/a	The 69 Eyes	Paris Kills	Backing vocals	
2003	"Love Me"	Lowemotor Corporation	Saturnalia	Backing vocals	
2004	—N/a	The 69 Eyes	Devils	Backing vocals	
2004	"Doktor Goodfeel"	The Skreppers	Call of the Trash	Backing vocals	
2004	"Let's Die Together Sheena"	The Skreppers	Call of the Trash	Backing vocals	
2004	"Jesus Saved My Sexlife"	The Skreppers	Call of the Trash	Backing vocals	
2004	"Shake It Baby"	The Skreppers	Call of the Trash	Backing vocals	
2005	"Something Diabolical"	Bloodhound Gang	Hefty Fine	Co-lead vocals	
2006	"The End of the World"	Jeff Walker und Die Fluffers	Welcome to Carcass Cuntry	Bass, backing vocals	
2006	"Keep on Rocking in the Free World"	Jeff Walker und Die Fluffers	Welcome to Carcass Cuntry	Bass, backing vocals	
2006	"The Byronic Man"	Cradle of Filth	Thornography	Co-lead vocals	
2006	"If I Die Tonight"	Isabelle's Gift	American Idle	Backing vocals	
2008	"Rock 'n' Roll High School"	Save Nuta		Backing vocals	
2008	"Black No. 1"	Roadrunner United	Roadrunner United: The Concert	Lead vocals	
2010	"Angels Walk Among Us"	Anathema	We're Here Because We're Here	Backing vocals	
2014	"Whisper in the Chaos '97"	Lullacry	Legacy 1998–2014	Lead vocals	
2016	"Met-amor-phosis"	The Mission	Another Fall from Grace	Backing vocals	
2018	"Wild Talk"	Andy McCoy	Soul Satisfaction	Backing vocals	
