= Framed in Blood – The Very Blessed of the 69 Eyes =

Greatest hits album by The 69 Eyes
- Released: 2003
- Genre: Gothic rock
- Length: 70:23
- Label: Gaga Goodies, Poko, Cleopatra

The 69 Eyes chronology
Paris Kills (2002)	Framed in Blood – The Very Blessed of the 69 Eyes (2003)	Devils (2004)

Framed in Blood – The Very Blessed of the 69 Eyes is a compilation album released by the Finnish rock band The 69 Eyes in 2003 through Gaga Goodies / Poko Rekords. It was released in the US on 29 August 2006 by Cleopatra Records. The album contains tracks from across the band's career, including both their glam metal- and gothic rock-styled works. Albums represented on the compilation run from "Savage Garden" to "Paris Kills".

== Track listing ==
1. "Brandon Lee" (Blessed Be)
2. "Dance d'Amour" (Paris Kills)
3. "Gothic Girl" (Blessed Be)
4. "Wasting the Dawn" (Wasting the Dawn)
5. "Crashing High" (Paris Kills)
6. "The Chair" (Blessed Be)
7. "Velvet Touch" (original version) (Savage Garden)
8. "Call Me" (Wrap Your Troubles in Dreams)
9. "Stolen Season" (Blessed Be)
10. "Betty Blue" (Paris Kills)
11. "Wrap Your Troubles in Dreams" (Wrap Your Troubles in Dreams)
12. "Framed in Blood" (Blessed Be)
13. "Tang" (Savage Garden)
14. "Too Much to Lose" (Wrap Your Troubles in Dreams)
15. "Still Waters Run Deep" (Paris Kills)
16. "Ghettoway Car" (Savage Garden)
17. "Lay Down Your Arms, Girl" (Wasting the Dawn)
18. "Babysitter" (Music for Tattooed Ladies & Motorcycle Mamas Vol 1)
