= Back in Blood =

Back in Blood may refer to:

- Back in Blood (album), an album by The 69 Eyes
- Back in Blood, an album by Debauchery
- "Back in Blood" (song), by Pooh Shiesty from the mixtape Shiesty Season
