= Perfect Skin (The 69 Eyes song) =

Single by The 69 Eyes

from the album Angels (The 69 Eyes album)
- Released: 2007
- Genre: Gothic rock
- Label: Virgin Finland
- Songwriter(s): Bazie, Patric Jonsson, Jyrki 69, Johnny Michaels, Jimmy Wahlsteen

The 69 Eyes singles chronology
"Sister of Charity" (2005)	"Perfect Skin" (2007)	"Never Say Die" (2007)

Music video
- "Perfect Skin" on YouTube

"Perfect Skin" is the first single from the eighth studio album Angels of Finnish rock band The 69 Eyes, released in 2007 through Virgin Finland.

The video for "Perfect Skin" was filmed in Hollywood in October 2006 and was directed by Ralf Strathmann.

The live tracks on the single were recorded at a sold out Whisky A Go-Go show in Hollywood in March 2006. The venue was also the place they recorded their very first live album The 69 Eyes: Hollywood Kills.

== Track listing ==
1. "Perfect Skin" – 3:45
2. "Devils (live)" – 4:27
3. "Christina Death (live)" – 4:33
4. "I Just Want to Have Something to Do (live)" (Ramones cover) – 3:14
5. Website extras included as Enhanced CD content
