= Christine Dolce =

Mid-2000s Internet celebrity (1981–2017)

- Born: August 31, 1981; Long Beach, California, U.S.
- Died: February 5, 2017 (aged 35); Huntington Beach, California, U.S.
- Other name: ForBiddeN
- Height: 1.68 m (5 ft 6 in)

Christine Dolce (August 31, 1981 – February 5, 2017), also known as "ForBiddeN", was an American MySpace Internet celebrity in the mid-2000s.

Proclaimed "The Queen of MySpace" by Vanity Fair and The Tyra Banks Show, Dolce created her profile shortly after its inception. With over a million "friends", Dolce was one of its most popular members.

Dolce parlayed her MySpace celebrity into other projects including a website and fashion brand. She also appeared in a celebrity pictorial in Playboys October 2006 issue and in the video game Def Jam: Icon. She modeled for Axe Deodorant's "Gamekillers" MySpace campaign and appears on the cover of gothic rock band The 69 Eyes' album Angels. She also posed for one of PeTA's anti-fur ads.

Dolce was named the Naughtiest "Cybervixen" on the Spike TV Guys' Choice Awards on June 13, 2007.

Dolce died on February 5, 2017, from liver failure. She had been hospitalized since December 2016 after struggling throughout her life with alcoholism.
