= Musta Paraati =

Finnish post-punk/gothic rock band

- Origin: Finland
- Genres: Gothic rock; post-punk
- Years active: 1981–1985; 1987; 2014–present
- Labels: Johanna; Svart Records; Cleopatra
- Members: Herra Ylppö Saku Paasiniemi Karo Broman Ykä Knuuttila Karppa Tornack
- Past members: Jore Vastelin; General Njassa; Epe Kronholm; Sande Vettenranta; Jesu Hämäläinen; Gabi Hakanen; Panda Nikander; Jari Kääriäinen; Herra Ylppö; Puka Oinonen; Jyrki 69; Archzie

Musta Paraati (Black Parade in English) are a Finnish post-punk/gothic rock band, comparable to Killing Joke and Theatre of Hate. The original band was active for only a few years in the early 1980s, but their lineup changed many times before they dissolved circa 1985. The band made one comeback gig in 1987. Original vocalist Jore Vastelin (succeeded by Njassa and Epe Kronholm) died of a cardiac arrest in 1993 at the age of 30. The early 2000s post-punk revival led to renewed appreciation for the band, resulting in a CD release of their 1983 debut album Peilitalossa with several singles appended as bonus tracks.

Musta Paraati reunited in 2015 to play several concerts in Finland, including the Provinssirock festival in Seinäjoki on June 27. This edition of the band featured the Peilitalossa-era lineup with Herra Ylppö of Maj Karma replacing the late Vastelin. The reformed band also announced that they were planning to record new material.

Their third studio album and first in 36 years, Black Parade, featuring new vocalist Jyrki 69, was released in 2018 by Cleopatra Records. First Musta Paraati live-album TAVASTIA from 2015 Tavastia gig was released by DEGGAEL in 2023.

== Members ==
Current reunion lineup:

- Herra Ylppö – vocals (present)
- Saku Paasiniemi – guitars, backing vocals (1982–1985, 2014–present)
- Karo Broman – bass, backing vocals (present)
- Ykä Knuuttila – drums, backing vocals (1982–1983, 1987, 2014–present)
- Kari Tornack – keyboards (2018–present)

Former members:

- Jyrki 69 - vocals (2018-2019)
- Archzie - bass (2018-2019)
- Jore Vastelin – vocals, guitars (1981–1983, 1987; died 1993)
- Panda Nikander – bass (1981–1985, 1987, 2014–2015)
- Jari Kääriäinen – keyboards (1981–1985, 1987, 2014–2015)
- General Njassa – vocals (1981, 1983–1984)
- Epe Kronholm – vocals (1984–1985)
- Sande Vettenranta – drums (1984–1985)
- Jesu Hämäläinen – synths, keyboards (1984–1985)
- Gabi Hakanen – drums (1983), production (2015)
- Herra Ylppö – vocals (2014–2015)
- Puka Oinonen – bass (2014)
- Erno Laitinen – production (2015)
- Karo Broman – keyboards, bass, mixing, production (2018)

== Discography ==
=== Studio albums ===
- Peilitalossa (English: In the House of Mirrors) (1983, Johanna; 2012, Svart Records)
- Käärmeet (English: Snakes) (1984, Johanna)
- Black Parade (2018, Cleopatra Records)

=== Live albums ===
- TAVASTIA from 2015 Tavastia gig (2023, DEGGAEL)

=== Singles and EPs ===
- "Romanssi" b/w "Kädet" (English: "Romance"/"Hands") (7") (1982, Johanna)
- "Johtaja" b/w "Jää" (English: "Leader"/"Stay") (7") (1983, Johanna)
- "Myrsky Nousee" b/w "Punainen Salama" (English: "Storm Arising"/"Red Lightning") 7" (1984, Johanna)
- "Uusi Musta" b/w "Uudet Juhlat" (English: "New Black"/"New Party") (digital) (Sony Music Entertainment Finland, 2015)
