= Topi Sorsakoski =

Finnish singer (1952–2011)

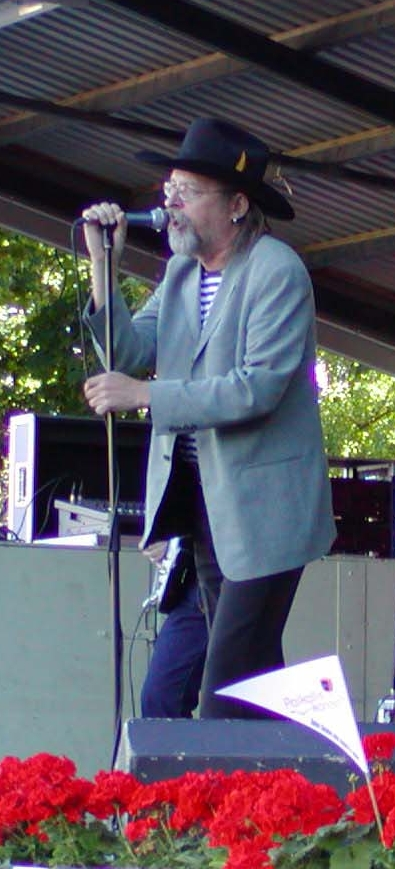
Topi Sorsakoski on 2 August 2001.

Pekka Erkki Juhani Tammilehto (27 October 1952 – 13 August 2011), better known by his stage name Topi Sorsakoski, was a Finnish singer. His father was Finnish tango singer Yrjö Johannes "Tapio" Tammilehto.

== Career ==
Sorsakoski started his career in the Kalle Kiwes Blues Band together with his brother, Antti, who later played in various bands together with Juice Leskinen. Some of Sorsakoski's cousins are also musicians: Seppo Tammilehto, who played in Alwari Tuohitorvi and later had a solo career; and Juhani Tammela, who has played old dancehall music in his quintet in the 1960s. Next Sorsakoski worked as the guitarist in the band The Boys.

In the 1980s, he started performing together with the band Agents, also singing songs earlier performed by Olavi Virta. Sorsakoski later had a solo career and also worked with the band Kulkukoirat. He returned for a time to the Agents beginning in May 2007.

== Death ==
Sorsakoski died on Saturday, 13 August 2011 at Seinäjoki Central Hospital. He was 58 years old and had suffered from lung cancer.

== Discography ==
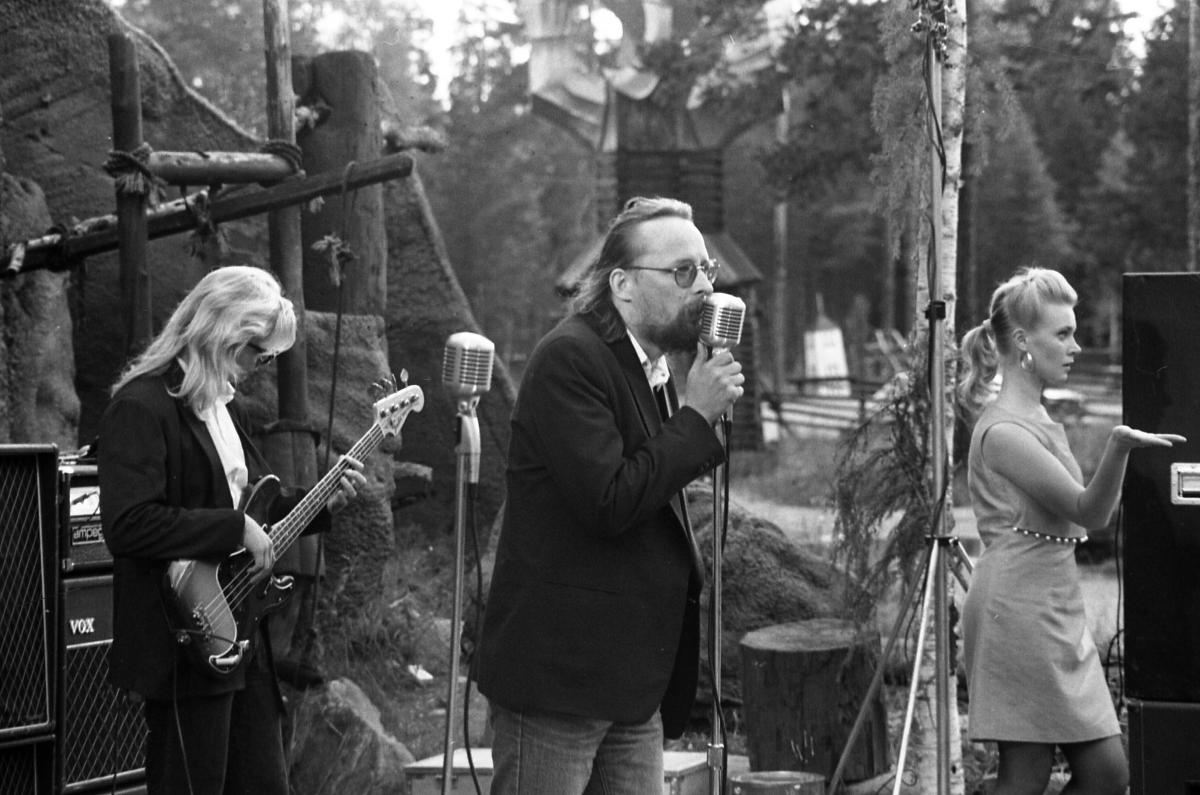
Topi Sorsakoski and Agents in 9.8.1988

=== Albums ===
- Hurmio (albumi) (1985)
- In Beat (1986) – by Topi Sorsakoski & Agents
- Besame Mucho (albumi) (1987) – by Topi Sorsakoski & Agents
- Pop (Topi Sorsakosken ja Agentsin albumi) (1988) – by Topi Sorsakoski & Agents
- Half and Half (1990) – by Topi Sorsakoski & Agents
- Yksinäisyys (albumi) (1991)
- Kulkukoirat (1992) – by Topi Sorsakoski & Reijo Taipale:
- Iltarusko (albumi) (1993)
- Yksinäisyys osa 2 (1995)
- Kalliovuorten kuu (1997)
- Evergreens (1999)
- Muukalainen (albumi) (2000)
- Luotu lähtemään (2002) – by Topi Sorsakoski & Kulkukoirat
- Jossakin... Suomessa (2005) – by Topi Sorsakoski & Kulkukoirat
- Renegades (Agentsin albumi) (2007) – by Topi Sorsakoski & Agents
- Itse asiassa (2009)
- Tummansininen sävel (2011)

=== Compilations ===
- Topi Sorsakoski & Agents:
  - Greatest Hits (Topi Sorsakoski & Agents) (1988)
  - In memoriam (1992)
  - Muistojen peili (2000)
  - Muistojen peili 2 (2002)
  - Surujen kitara – 32 Greatest Hits (2002)
  - Muistojeni laulut – 30 hienointa levytystä (2008)
  - Kultaa ja timantteja – Laulajan juhlakokoelma 1976–2011 (2012)
  - Complete – Kaikki levytykset 1984–1992 (2023)
