= Motor City Resurrection =

Compilation album by The 69 Eyes
- Released: 1994; 2007(re-issue)
- Genre: Proto-punk; glam rock; glam metal
- Length: 46:02; 70:54 (re-issue)
- Label: Gaga Goodies, Poko Rekords

The 69 Eyes chronology
Bump 'n' Grind (1992)	Motor City Resurrection (1994)	Savage Garden (1995)

Professional ratings
Review scores
Source	Rating
AllMusic	2.5/5 stars

Motor City Resurrection is an album by Finnish rock band The 69 Eyes, released in 1994. Although often listed as a studio album, it is a compilation of the band's early 7" singles and EPs. It even features a cover of Gimme Some Head, originally by the cult shock rocker GG Allin and MC5's Wayne Kramer. In 2007, the album was re-released on Cleopatra Records for distribution within the US. The re-released version includes additional cover songs and two original songs from previous singles, EPs, and tribute albums.

== Track listing ==
1. "Discipline" – 3:17
2. "Deuce" (KISS cover) – 2:57
3. "Mrs. Sleazy" – 3:45
4. "Hot Butterfly" – 5:01
5. "Sugarman" – 2:29
6. "Stop Bitching!" – 2:54
7. "Barbarella" – 3:07
8. "Gimme Some Skin" (The Stooges cover) – 3:02
9. "Juicy Lucy" – 3:41
10. "The Hills Have Eyes" – 3:09
11. "Too Itching for Action" – 3:06
12. "No Hesitation" – 3:43
13. "Alive!" – 2:39
14. "Gimme Some Head" (GG Allin cover) – 3:06

Bonus tracks

1. "One-Shot Woman" – 3:18
2. "TV Eye" (The Stooges cover) – 3:51
3. "Motormouth" – 3:04
4. "Return of the Fly" (Misfits cover) – 2:03
5. "Is It My Body" (Alice Cooper cover) – 2:52
6. "Call Me Animal" (MC5 cover) – 2:10
7. "Vietnamese Baby" (With Andy McCoy) (New York Dolls cover) – 3:36
8. "Science Gone Too Far" (The Dictators cover) 4:04

== EPs ==
High Times-Low Life

1. "Mrs. Sleazy"
2. "Discipline"
3. "Stop Bitching!"

Never Too Loud!!!

1. "Too Iching for Action"
2. "Call Me Animal"

Deuce AKA Suck My Mick!

1. "Deuce"
2. "Is It My Body"

The 69 Eyes & Backyard Babies: Supershow Split

1. Backyard Babies: "Mommy's Little Monster" (Social Distortion cover)
2. The 69 Eyes: "One-Shot Woman"

== Tributes ==
Dictators Forever, Forever Dictators (tribute to The Dictators)

1. "The 69 Eyes: "Science Gone Too Far!""

I Wanna Be a Stooges (tribute to The Stooges)

1. "The 69 Eyes: "Gimme Some Skin""

Hell on Earth: A Tribute to the Misfits

1. "The 69 Eyes: "Return of the Fly""

Stranded in the Doll's House (tribute to the New York Dolls)

1. "The 69 Eyes & Andy McCoy: "Vietnamese Baby""

== Personnel ==
- J. Darling – vocals
- Bazie – lead guitar
- Timo-Timo – rhythm guitar
- Archzie – bass
- Jussi – drums
