= Neon Noir =

2023 studio album by VV

Studio album by VV
- Released: 13 January 2023
- Recorded: 2019–2022
- Length: 56:33
- Label: Heartagram; Universal; Spinefarm
- Producer: Ville Valo; Tim Palmer

VV chronology
Gothica Fennica, Vol. 1 (2020)	Neon Noir (2023)

Singles from Neon Noir
- 1. "Run Away from the Sun" Released: 19 March 2020; 2. "Loveletting" Released: 8 April 2022; 3. "Echolocate Your Love" Released: 2 September 2022; 4. "The Foreverlost" Released: 4 November 2022; 5. "Neon Noir" Released: 13 January 2023

Neon Noir is the debut studio album by former HIM frontman Ville Valo, released on 13 January 2023. The album debuted at number one on the Finnish albums chart and in the top five of the German albums chart.

== Background ==
Upon the conclusion of his previous project Ville Valo & Agents in August 2019, Valo began experimenting with recording new music in his home studio. With the onset of widespread lockdown measures in response to the COVID-19 pandemic in March 2020, Valo self-released a three-track EP entitled Gothica Fennica, Vol. 1 under the moniker VV to gauge interest. The EP was fully produced, engineered, and performed by Valo with mixing by longtime HIM collaborator Tim Palmer. Through 2021, Valo continued recording material and negotiating distribution deals for the impending release of a full-length album, ultimately settling on his own Heartagram Records imprint publishing while distribution is handled by Universal and its subsidiary, the established Finnish heavy metal record label Spinefarm.

The album title, Neon Noir, carries over HIM's convention of combining two contradictory ideas in album titles. Neon referring to bright lighting and "noir" being the French word for black. The title is also a pun nodding to neo-noir films, exemplified by melodramatic storytelling and visually contrasting darkness and light.

On 14 September 2022, Valo confirmed the tracklist and release date of Neon Noir. Pre-orders with limited edition bundles were made available the same date.

== Artwork and packaging ==
The cover photograph for the album was shot by Joonas Brandt using a Mamiya RZ67 black and white camera on Kodak Tri-X 400 film. The album will be released in limited edition vinyl, and CD formats, with packaging designed by Ville Valo and graphic designer Rami Mursula, with whom Valo has been working since HIM's 2013 release Tears on Tape.

== Reception ==
Professional ratings
Review scores
Source	Rating
Metal Injection	7/10
Wall of Sound	9/10

Reviewing the album for Tone Deaf, Conor Lochrie wrote that "Instrumentally the album sounds most like the latter of HIM's discography, taking from albums like Screamworks: Love in Theory and Practice and Tears on Tape", and concluding that "Neon Noir is a glowing hope in a murky world".

It was ranked as one of the best debut albums of 2023 by Classic Rock.

== Track listing ==
All tracks are written by Ville Valo.

Neon Noir track listing
No.	Title	Length
1.	"Echolocate Your Love"	3:24
2.	"Run Away from the Sun"	4:12
3.	"Neon Noir"	4:56
4.	"Loveletting"	4:49
5.	"The Foreverlost"	3:30
6.	"Baby Lacrimarium"	3:50
7.	"Salute the Sanguine"	5:06
8.	"In Trenodia"	5:04
9.	"Heartful of Ghosts"	4:52
10.	"Saturnine Saturnalia"	6:37
11.	"Zener Solitaire"	2:31
12.	"Vertigo Eyes"	7:42
Total length:		56:33

== Personnel ==
- Written, produced, engineered, and performed by Ville Valo (Helsinki)
- Co-produced and Mixed by Tim Palmer at Studio 62 (Austin, Texas)
- Mastered by Justin Shturtz at Sterling Sound (New York City)
- Art by Ville Valo with Rami Mursula
- Published by Heartagram

== Charts ==
Chart performance for Neon Noir
Chart (2023)	Peak position
Austrian Albums (Ö3 Austria)	13
Belgian Albums (Ultratop Flanders)	187
Finnish Albums (Suomen virallinen lista)	1
German Albums (Offizielle Top 100)	4
Spanish Albums (Promusicae)	34
Swiss Albums (Schweizer Hitparade)	19
