= Metallisydän =

Studio album by Maj Karman Kauniit Kuvat
- Released: March 14, 2001
- Genre: Rock
- Length: 39:20
- Label: Megamania
- Producer: Ahti Impola; Häiriö

Maj Karman Kauniit Kuvat chronology
Rautaneito (2001)	Metallisydän (2003)	Musta Paraati (2004)

Metallisydän (Finnish pronunciation: [ˈmetɑlːiˌsydæn]; "Metal Heart") is a 2003 album by the Finnish rock group Maj Karman Kauniit Kuvat.

== Track listing ==
1. "Iso mies pohjoisesta" - 2:51
2. "Metallisydän" - 3:18
3. "Ritarisydän" - 3:13
4. "Liskokuninkaan poika" - 2:54
5. "Rocktähti muistelee" - 2:45
6. "Elena Leeve" - 4:02
7. "Lady Day on kuollut" - 4:22
8. "Arpi" - 2:54
9. "Raskaat linnut" - 3:29
10. "Jonnat tulevat" - 2:17
11. "Katutyttöjen laulu" - 3:15
12. "Satulaulu" - 4:00
