= Orkus Presents the Best of 2000 =

Orkus Presents the best of 2000

Compilation album by Various artists
- Released: 2000
- Genre: Metal, Electronic music, Alternative, Medieval metal
- Label: EFA (Germany)

Various artists chronology
| Orkus Presents the best of 1999 (1999) | Orkus Presents the best of 2000 (2000) |

Orkus Presents the best of 2000 is a German 2-CD compilation album released in 2000, through EFA records Germany and is the follow-up to Orkus Presents the best of 1999. The album is a mixture of Heavy Metal, Electronic and Rock music.

== Track listing ==
=== Disc 1 ===
1. HIM - Poison Girl
2. In Extremo - Vollmond
3. Phillip Boa & The Voodooclub - Rome in the Rain
4. Theatre of Tragedy - Commute
5. The Cassandra Complex - Twice as Good (Apoptygma Berzerk Remix)
6. L'Ame Immortelle - Epitaph
7. Die Form - Deep Inside
8. Janus - Rorschach
9. Atrocity - Wilder Schmetterling
10. Covenant - One World One Sky
11. Zeromancer - Clone Your Lover
12. Love Like Blood - 7 Seconds
13. Umbra et Imago - Mea Culpa
14. Tanzwut - Bitte bitte (cover version)
15. And One - Wasted
16. Diary of Dreams - Butterfly: Dance!

=== Disc 2 ===
1. VNV Nation - Standing
2. Suicide Commando - Comatose Delusion (Overdose Shot One)
3. ASP - Schwarze Schmetterling
4. Corvus Corax - Estuans Intrisecus
5. Illuminate - Dunkellicht
6. Sanguis Et Cinis - Secret and Sin
7. Cinema Strange - Lindsay's Trachea
8. The 69 Eyes - Gothic Girl
9. Crematory - Act Seven
10. Samsas Traum - Für Immer
11. Fields of the Nephilim - One More Nightmare (Trees Come Down A.D.)
12. Clan of Xymox - Number 1
13. The Second Sight - Tomorrow
14. In Strict Confidence - Kiss Your Shadow
15. Terminal Choice - No Chance
16. Hocico - Poltergeist
