= X (The 69 Eyes album) =

Studio album by The 69 Eyes
- Released: 28 September 2012 (Europe); 9 October 2012 (US)
- Studio: Sonic Pump Studios, Helsinki; Softwall Studio, Stockholm; Hydra Studio, Stockholm
- Genre: Hard rock; gothic rock; alternative rock
- Length: 41:11
- Label: Nuclear Blast (Europe, US); RCA/Sony (Finland)
- Producer: Patric Jonsson; Joakim Övrenius

The 69 Eyes chronology
Back in Blood (2009)	X (2012)	Universal Monsters (2016)

X (as in the Roman numeral for 10) is the tenth studio album by Finnish rock band The 69 Eyes. The band chose "Red" as their first single. Days before the release of X, they released "Borderline" as their second single.

"Rosary Blue", a bonus track, features vocals by American tattoo artist Kat Von D.

== Reception ==
Professional ratings
Review scores
Source	Rating
Blistering	7.5/10
Metal Hammer (Germany)	6/7; 3/7
Orkus	8.5/10

The Blistering magazine marked a "versatile" mix of styles with notes of Billy Idol, Johnny Cash and Danzig. The reviewer wrote also that the marketing of the album and the band in general would benefit from their change to the Nuclear Blast label.

X received mixed reviews from the German music press. In a very positive review, the Orkus magazine noted a change from guitar-dominated hymns to melodic rock tunes and praised singer Jyrki69's "passionate" singing. Metal Hammer Germany released two different staff reviews, noting that the board of editors was at odds with rating the album. While Enrico Ahlig praised a return to melodic ballads and a "Finnish melancholy", and rated "Borderline" the best track by The 69 Eyes for the last ten years, Jakob Kranz wrote a negative review. He called the songs "sticky" (German: klebrig) and noted that the album sounded too commercial.

== Track listing ==
Regular edition
No.	Title	Length
1.	"Love Runs Away (Bazie, Joakim Övrenius, Jyrki 69)"	4:23
2.	"Tonight (Bazie, Jimmy Wahlsteen, Joakim Övrenius, Jyrki 69)"	3:44
3.	"Black (Bazie, Joakim Övrenius, Jyrki 69)"	4:38
4.	"If You Love Me the Morning After (Bazie, Joakim Övrenius, Jyrki 69)"	4:21
5.	"Red (Bazie, Jimmy Wahlsteen, Joakim Övrenius, Jyrki 69)"	3:47
6.	"I Love the Darkness in You (Bazie, Jyrki 69)"	3:19
7.	"Borderline (Bazie, Jyrki 69)"	3:54
8.	"I'm Ready (Bazie, Jyrki 69)"	4:10
9.	"I Know What You Did Last Summer (Bazie, Joakim Övrenius, Jyrki 69)"	5:05
10.	"When a Love Comes to an End (Bazie, Joakim Övrenius, Jyrki 69)"	3:50

iTunes bonus track
No.	Title	Length
11.	"Rosary Blue" (featuring Kat Von D)	5:15
12.	"Red (Bazie, Jimmy Wahlsteen, Joakim Övrenius, Jyrki 69)" (video)	3:18

== Singles ==
Red
No.	Title	Length
1.	"Red (Radio Edit)"	3:13
2.	"Red"	3:46

Borderline
No.	Title	Length
1.	"Borderline"	3:54

Love Runs Away
No.	Title	Length
1.	"Love Runs Away"	4:23
2.	"Dracula's Castle" (featuring Rudi Protrudi)	4:11
3.	"Rosary Blue (Edit)" (featuring Kat Von D)	4:20

Tonight
No.	Title	Length
1.	"Tonight"	3:44
2.	"Dracula's Castle" (featuring Rudi Protrudi)	4:11
3.	"Rosary Blue (Edit)" (featuring Kat Von D)	4:20

Rosary Blue (feat. Kat Von D)
No.	Title	Length
1.	"Rosary Blue (feat. Kat Von D) (Edit)"	4:20

== Notes ==
- The singles "Love Runs Away" and "Tonight" were released simultaneously via iTunes. "Tonight" was released exclusively in Finland, whereas "Love Runs Away" was released everywhere else.

== Credits ==
- Jyrki 69 – vocals
- Bazie – lead guitar
- Timo-Timo – rhythm guitar
- Archzie – bass
- Jussi 69 – drums
- Kat Von D – female vocals on "Rosary Blue"
