= Maj Karma =

Finnish rock/metal band

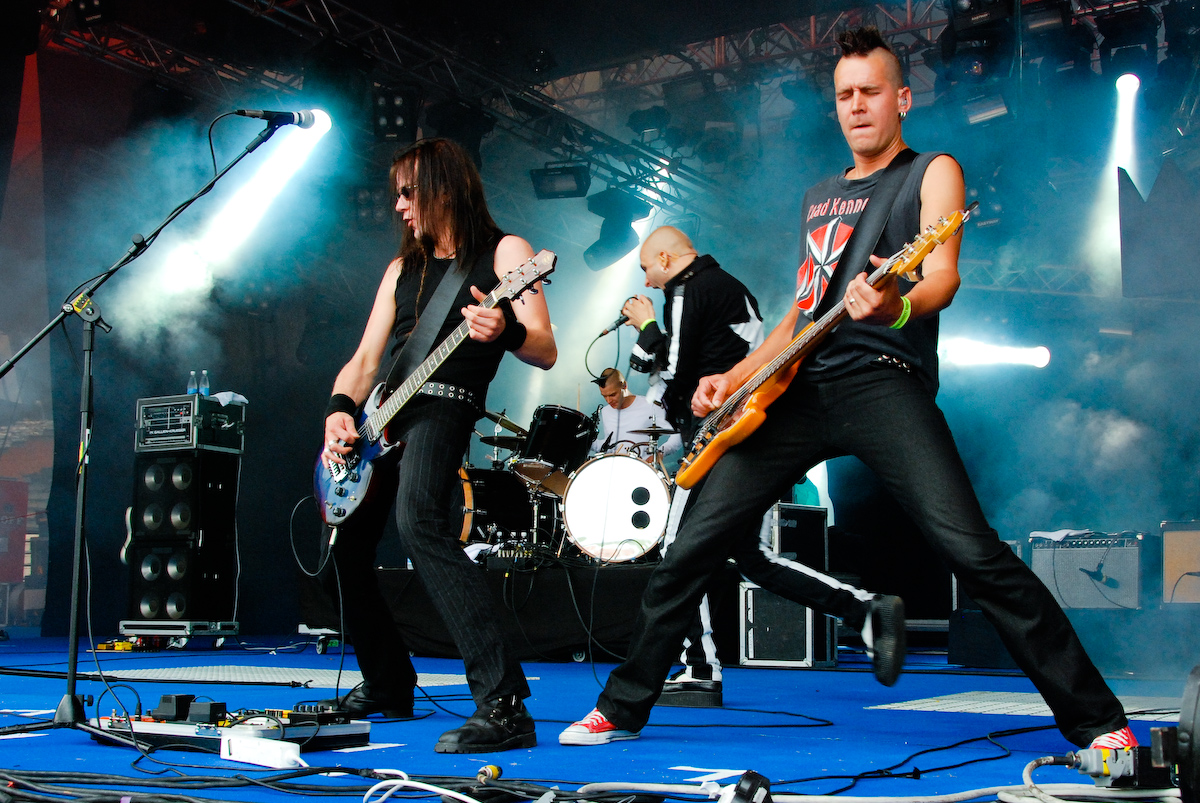

Background information
- Origin: Harjavalta, Finland
- Genres: Rock
- Years active: 1992–present
- Members: Häiriö Piirinen; Herra Ylppö; J. Savolainen; K. Kurittu
- Website: majkarma.fi

Maj Karma (formerly Maij' Karman kauniit kuvat and Maj Karman kauniit kuvat) is a Finnish rock / metal band formed in 1992.

== Members ==
=== Current line-up ===
- Herra Ylppö – vocals and lyrics
- Häiriö Piirinen – guitar
- Kimmo Kurittu – bass guitar (2005-)
- Janne Savolainen – drums

=== Ex-members ===
- V.V.V. – bass guitar (1992–2004)
- Junnu ja kummitusjuna – bass guitar (1992)
- Kanttori Väyrynen a.k.a. Paska Väyrynen – lights (1996–2002)

== Discography ==
=== Albums ===
- Kaukana puhelimista (1996)
- Kaakao (1998)
- Ääri (2000)
- Rautaneito (2001)
- Metallisydän (2003)
- Sodankylä (2004)
- Ukkonen (2006)
- Salama (2009)
- Peltisydän (2016)
- 101 tapaa olla vapaa (2018)

=== EPs ===
- Iskelmä (1997)
- Musta paraati (2004, a cover EP in tribute to the Finnish gothic rock band Musta paraati)
- Attentaatti (2007)

=== Singles ===
- Ovisilmä (1998)
- Buster Keaton (1998)
- Homma (1999)
- Rinta (2000)
- Valaiden laulu (2000)
- Rocktähti (2001)
- Romanssi (2001)
- Arpi (2003)
- Katutyttöjen laulu (2003)
- Kyynel (2004)
- Sodankylä (2005)
- Sarvia ja hampaita (2005)
- Rukous (2006)
- Luovuttanut enkeli (2006)
- Ukkonen (2006)
- Kokki, varas, vaimo ja rakastaja (2006)
- Salama (2009)
