= The 69 Eyes: Hollywood Kills =

Live album by The 69 Eyes
- Released: 2008
- Length: 71:29
- Label: Virgin Finland

The 69 Eyes chronology
Angels (2007)	The 69 Eyes: Hollywood Kills (2008)	Back in Blood (2009)

The 69 Eyes: Hollywood Kills – Live at the Whisky a Go Go is a live album by Finnish rock band the 69 Eyes. It was released 16 January 2008 through Virgin Finland. This is the first live album the band has made. A slightly altered version is included on the bonus disc of the 69 Eye's 2009 album, Back in Blood.

It was recorded March 2006 on the last show of their first North American tour.

== Track listing ==
1. "Introduction by Bam Margera" – 0:37
2. "Devils" – 4:01
3. "Don't Turn Your Back on Fear" – 3:49
4. "Betty Blue" – 3:55
5. "Christina Death" – 4:27
6. "Crashing High" – 3:42
7. "The Chair" – 2:27
8. "Hevioso" – 4:31
9. "Feel Berlin" – 5:08
10. "Gothic Girl" – 5:16
11. "Wrap Your Troubles in Dreams" – 4:35
12. "Sister of Charity" – 5:06
13. "Dance d'Amour" – 4:00
14. "Framed in Blood" – 4:15
15. "Lost Boys" – 5:20
16. "I Just Wanna Have Something to Do" (Ramones cover) – 3:01
17. "Brandon Lee" – 5:11

At the end of "Lost Boys", the band plays the outro of the Metallica song "For Whom the Bell Tolls".
