= Angels (The 69 Eyes album) =

Studio album by The 69 Eyes
- Released: 5 March 2007
- Genre: Hard rock
- Length: 44:15
- Label: Virgin Records

The 69 Eyes chronology
Devils (2004)	Angels (2007)	Back in Blood (2009)

Professional ratings
Review scores
Source	Rating
AllMusic	4/5 stars
Gaffa	2/6 stars
PopMatters	7/10 stars

Angels is the eighth album by Finnish rock band The 69 Eyes. It is the sequel to the band's 2004 album Devils. The official release date was 5 March 2007. In Finland, though, it was released on 28 February 2007 as a limited edition CD/DVD set.

The first single from the album is called "Perfect Skin", and a video was released in 2006. Also, another single, titled "Never Say Die", was released and a video was also created for it.

== Track listing ==
1. "Angels" – 3:59
2. "Never Say Die" – 3:29
3. "Rocker" – 3:39
4. "Ghost" – 4:17
5. "Perfect Skin" – 3:45
6. "Wings & Hearts" – 5:05
7. "Star of Fate" – 4:50
8. "Los Angeles" – 3:48
9. "In My Name" – 3:36
10. "Shadow of Your Love" – 3:43
11. "Frankenhooker" – 4:03
12. "Only Fools Don't Fall Once More (Japan edition bonus track)- 4:18
13. "Wrap Your Troubles in Dreams" (US/Japan edition bonus track) – 4:32

=== Limited edition enhanced content ===
- Opendisc: Create your own link with The 69 Eyes

=== Reissue enhanced content ===
- Perfect Skin (video)
- Never Say Die (video)

== Angels/Devils + DVD ==
Angels

1. "Angels" – 3:59
2. "Never Say Die" – 3:29
3. "Rocker" – 3:39
4. "Ghost" – 4:17
5. "Perfect Skin" – 3:45
6. "Wings & Hearts" – 5:05
7. "Star of Fate" – 4:50
8. "Los Angeles" – 3:48
9. "In My Name" – 3:36
10. "Shadow of Your Love" – 3:43
11. "Frankenhooker" – 4:03
12. "Multimedia Track"

Devils

1. "Devils"
2. "Feel Berlin"
3. "Nothing on You"
4. "Sister of Charity"
5. "Lost Boys"
6. "Jimmy"
7. "August Moon"
8. "Beneath the Blue" (feat. Ville Valo)
9. "Christina Death"
10. "Hevioso"
11. "Only You Can Save Me"
12. "From Dusk 'Til Dawn" (bonus track)
13. "Pitchblack" (bonus track)

DVD

1. "Perfect Skin" (video)
2. "Devils" (video)
3. "Lost Boys" (video)
4. "Never Say Die" (video)
5. "Devils (live)"
6. "Christina Death" (live)
7. "Feel Berlin" (live)
8. "Lost Boys" (live)
9. "I Just Want to Have Something to Do" (live)
10. "On the Route 69 Presentation – Documentary"

== Limited edition bonus DVD ==
1. Perfect Skin (video)
2. Live at Whisky a Go-Go 2006:
  - Devils
  - Christina Death
  - Feel Berlin
  - Lost Boys
  - I Just Want to Have Something to Do
3. On the Route 69 Presentation

== Singles ==
Perfect Skin

1. "Perfect Skin" – 3:47
2. "Devils" (live) – 4:28
3. "Christina Death" (live) – 4:34
4. "I Just Want To Have Something to Do" (Ramones cover) (Live) – 3:17

Never Say Die

1. "Never Say Die" (Single Mix) – 3:32
2. "Never Say Die" (Album Mix) – 3:30
3. "Only Fools Don't Fall Once More" – 4:18

Rocker

1. "Rocker" – 3:39

Ghost

1. "Ghost" – 4:17
2. "Wrap Your Troubles in Dreams" (2007) – 4:31
3. "Never Say Die" (video)

== Notes ==
- The U.S. edition of the album contains a re-recorded version of the song "Wrap Your Troubles in Dreams" from the 1997 album of the same name.
- The model on the cover is MySpace celebrity and model Christine Dolce.

== Credits ==
- Jyrki 69 – lead vocals
- Bazie – lead guitar
- Timo-Timo – rhythm guitar
- Archzie – bass, backing vocals
- Jussi 69 – drums
