= Agents (Finnish band) =

Finnish band

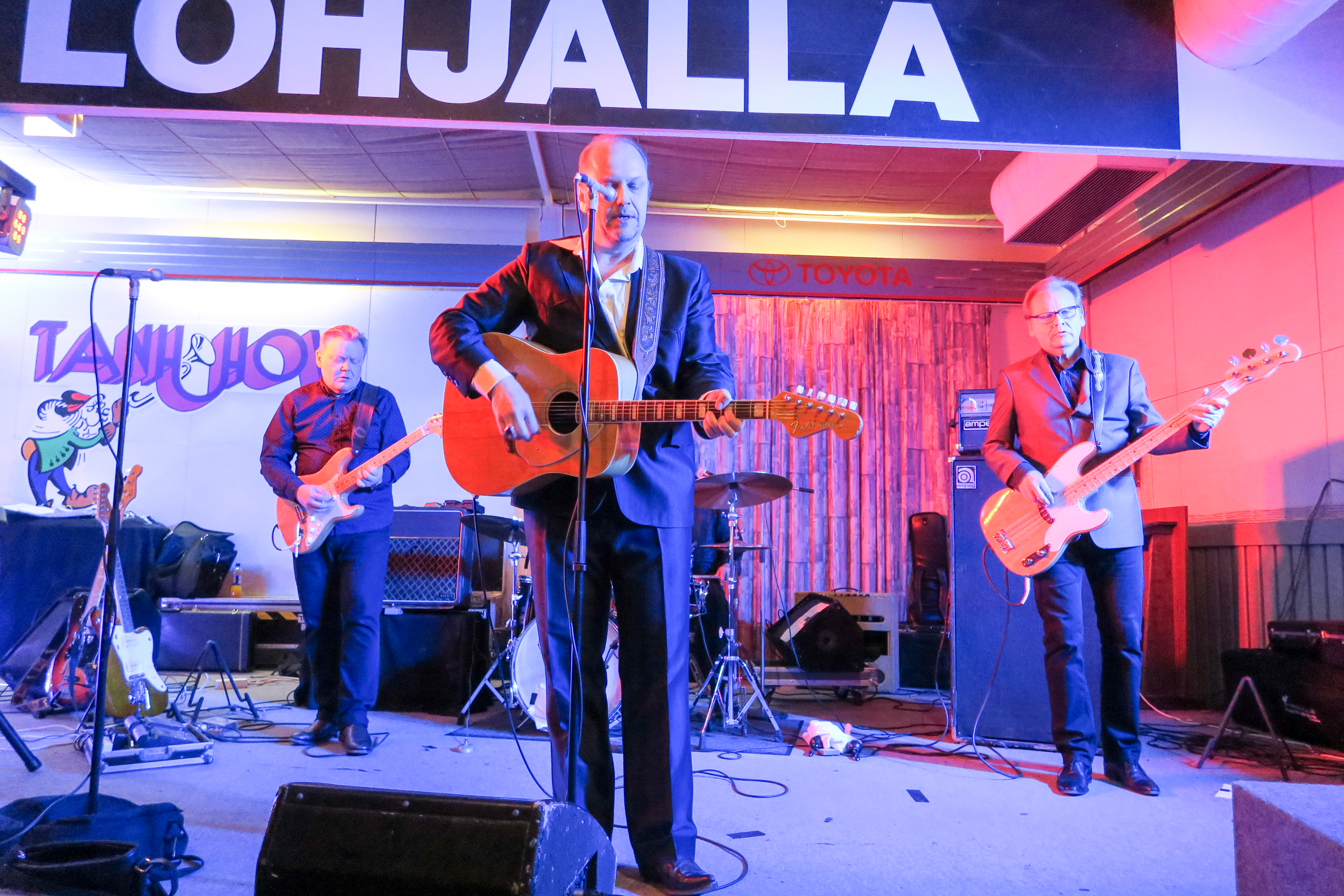

Background information
- Origin: Helsinki, Finland
- Genres: Schlager, rautalanka, rock'n'roll
- Years active: 1979–present
- Labels: Ratas Music Group
- Members: Esa Pulliainen; Kai Pulliainen; Jari "Kepa" Kettunen
- Past members: Ville Valo; Vesa Haaja; Jorma Kääriäinen; Topi Sorsakoski; Rauli Somerjoki; Pekka Rytkönen; Juha Takanen; Petri Rantala; Eero Ojanen; Jukka Ollila; Hans Etholén; Heikki Sandrén
- Website: agents.fi

Agents is a Finnish band formed in 1979, playing rautalanka, schlager and rock'n'roll music. The head figure and musical director of the band is solo guitarist Esa Pulliainen.

== History ==
=== Founding of Agents ===
Agents was founded in 1979 on the ruins of Tuomari Nurmio's band Köyhien ystävät. All former members of Köyhien ystävät, with the exception of Tuomari Nurmio, played in the original Agents. The band also recruited Esa's brother Kai Pulliainen and keyboard player Jukka Ollila. The lead singer was Pekka Rytkönen, nicknamed Beat-Pete.

=== Co-operating with Badding ===
Agents started co-operation with Rauli "Badding" Somerjoki in autumn 1981, which also meant the end of Beat-Pete's career in Agents. Jukka Ollila was also replaced by Petri Rantala.

The band's first album, Ikkunaprinsessa, was published in 1982. The album included the hits "Ikkunaprinsessa", "Kuihtuu kesäinen maa" and "Muista hyviä aikoja". Agents participated in the lyrics and music of the album.

The next album, Tähdet, tähdet, was published in 1983. The title song of the album became one of Badding's best known hits. Other hits from the album include "Nukkuja kaunein", "Yön hiljaisuudessa" and "Kun aika rientää". Esa Pulliainen arranged almost all music in the album.

The last album made in co-operation with Somerjoki, Laivat, was published in 1985. On the album, Agents plays under the alias The Young Beats. Hits from the last Badding album include "Laivat", "Illan varjoon himmeään", "Lähdön hetkellä" and "Tahdon".

Co-operation with Badding ended in 1985. During his last years, Badding performed with various bands, but Laivat was his last album. Agents had already been performing on and off with Topi Sorsakoski, who now became the official lead singer of the band. The keyboard player also resigned from the band alongside Badding.

=== Topi Sorsakoski & Agents ===
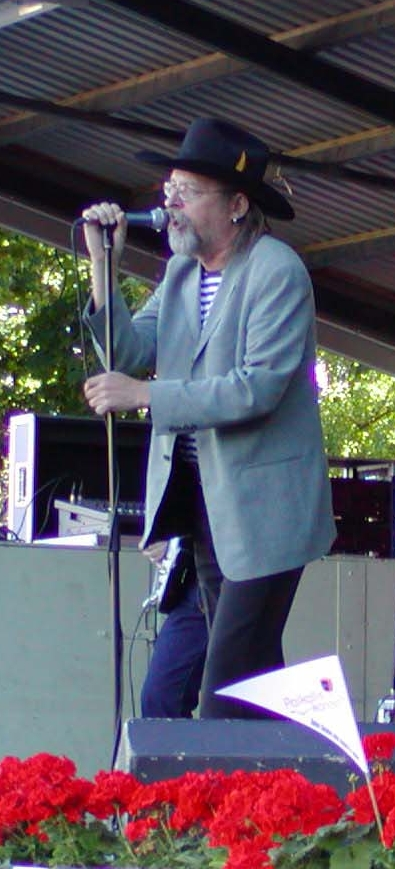
Topi Sorsakoski contributed vocals to four studio albums during his first tenure with Agents.

With Topi Sorsakoski as their primary lead singer, Agents went on to record their next studio album In Beat in 1985. The album, produced by Pedro Hietanen, was released in 1986 and it topped the Finnish album charts. In Beat was a commercial success and it was certified double platinum in Finland. The album provided hit songs "Surujen kitara", "Salattu Suru", "Eeva" and "Olen yksin".

In the next year, the band published another hit album, Besame Mucho. To the surprise of many, Besame Mucho doesn't feature on the album, instead the name is a trick played on purpose by Agents and Topi Sorsakoski. Hits from the album include "Kaksi kitaraa", "Kauan" and "Valot" (Badding's song as an instrumental version).

In 1988, the band published their third album, Pop. The third album also sold well. Hits from the album include "Tyhjää", "Varjojen yö", "On kesäyö", "Jo riittää" and "Nyt kaikki muuttunut on".

In 1989, Agents did not publish a new album. The EMI record company decided to publish a collection album called Greatest Hits, which the band did not like. The collection album sold well and reached a gold record.

In 1990, Agents' and Topi Sorsakoski's last album, Half and Half, was published. Half of the album contains sung material and the other half contains Agents' rautalanka music.

Topi Sorsakoski & Agents split up in 1992 because of internal arguments. Topi had published his solo album Yksinäisyys in 1991, which anticipated the end of the co-operation. One of the reasons was Topi Sorsakoski's financial troubles in the early 1990s, and he would have wanted higher commissions from their performances and records. In common with Topi Sorsakoski, the assisting guitarist Hans Etholén and the drummer Juha Takanen, both of which had been playing in the band since the Köyhien ystävät days, also quit the band.

=== Agents & Jorma Kääriäinen ===
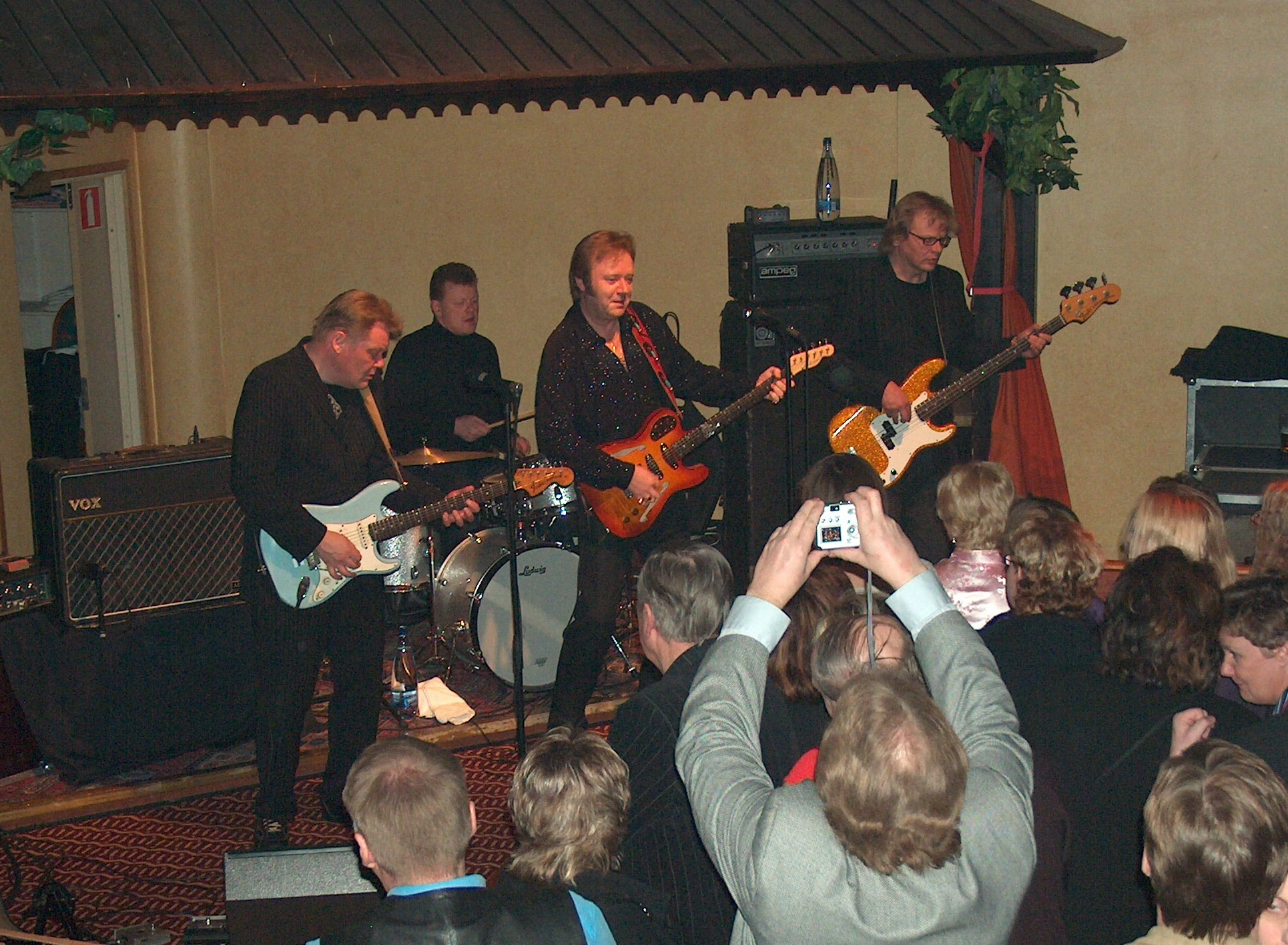
Agents & J Kääriäinen in 2006

In 1992, Esa Pulliainen invited Jorma Kääriäinen as the lead singer of Agents. The band also got a new drummer, Heikki Sandrén. The keyboard player on the albums was J-P Virtanen.

The first album, Agents Forever, was published in 1995. Hits included "Antaudun", "Tähti kaukainen" and "Pikku Mona".

The next album, Agents Is Back!, was published in 1996. Hits included "Moskovan valot", "Salainen rakkaus" and "Salaperäinen".

The third album, Agents Is More!, was published in 1997. The album also contained Agents' rautalanka music. Hits included "Päivin öin", "Sinä vain", "Valot" (Badding's song as a new version), "My babe", "King Creole" and "Minä kuljen".

The fourth album, Agents Is Best!, was published in 1998. Hits included "Illan varjoon himmeään", "Muistan kesän" and "Olen syytön".

Agents started a TV show called Laulava sydän on YLE TV2. In 1999, a double album with the same name was published, featuring many other artists, such as Ville Valo, Pate Mustajärvi, Marko Haavisto, Topi Sorsakoski and Reijo Taipale. The album reached a gold record.

In 2001, the album Agents is... here! was published. The album also contained Agents' rautalanka music.

In 2001, the rock album Agents is... rock! was published. Hits included "Hound dog", "Move it" and "Teenage Dolly".

In 2003, a new album, Agents is... tonight was published. Hits included "Jos näin ei koskaan", "Fever" and "Peliä vain".

In 2004, a co-operation album with The Boys, called Pop Show, was published. The album was accompanied with common concerts in the next summer all over Finland. Hits from the common album included "Tahdon saaren", "Yyterin twist", "Takaa ajatusten virran" and "Leningrad".

In November 2004, the second collection album from Jorma Kääriäinen and Agents was published. The album contains five new releases from Agents. ...Is best vol. 2 reached a platinum record, 30 thousand sold records, in June 2005.

On 13 September 2006, the seventh and currently the latest studio album from Jorma Kääriäinen and Agents, ...Is Allright, was published.

In October 2006, Agents announced they were withdrawing from playing and recording for a long while. The lead singer Jorma Kääriäinen currently performs as a solo artist and published his new solo record, Yhden tähden hotelli, in spring 2007.

=== Topi Sorsakoski's comeback as lead singer of Agents ===
Topi Sorsakoski returned as lead singer of Agents for one album and one tour. In autumn 2007, a new Agents album, based on material released by the 1960s British rock band The Renegades, was published. Topi Sorsakoski & Agents also performed a small tour accompanying the album.

=== Instrumental album ===
On 13 August 2008, a new studio album, Agents... Is Beat! - Instrumental 2008 Recordings was published. The album consists solely of instrumental music.

=== Agents & Vesa Haaja ===
On 26 August 2008, the band announced they had hired a new lead singer, Vesa Haaja. Born in 1968, Vesa "Vesku" Haaja is a Finnish musician and vocalist who had previously sung in the band Whistle Bait as well as in The Barnshakers and in Hi-Fly Rangers.

The band was also joined by the saxophone player Juho Hurskainen.

The most recent album releases of Agents have been credited to Agents & Vesa Haaja, the first being On Stage / In Studio in 2012 followed by Sound on Sound in 2014.

== Music ==
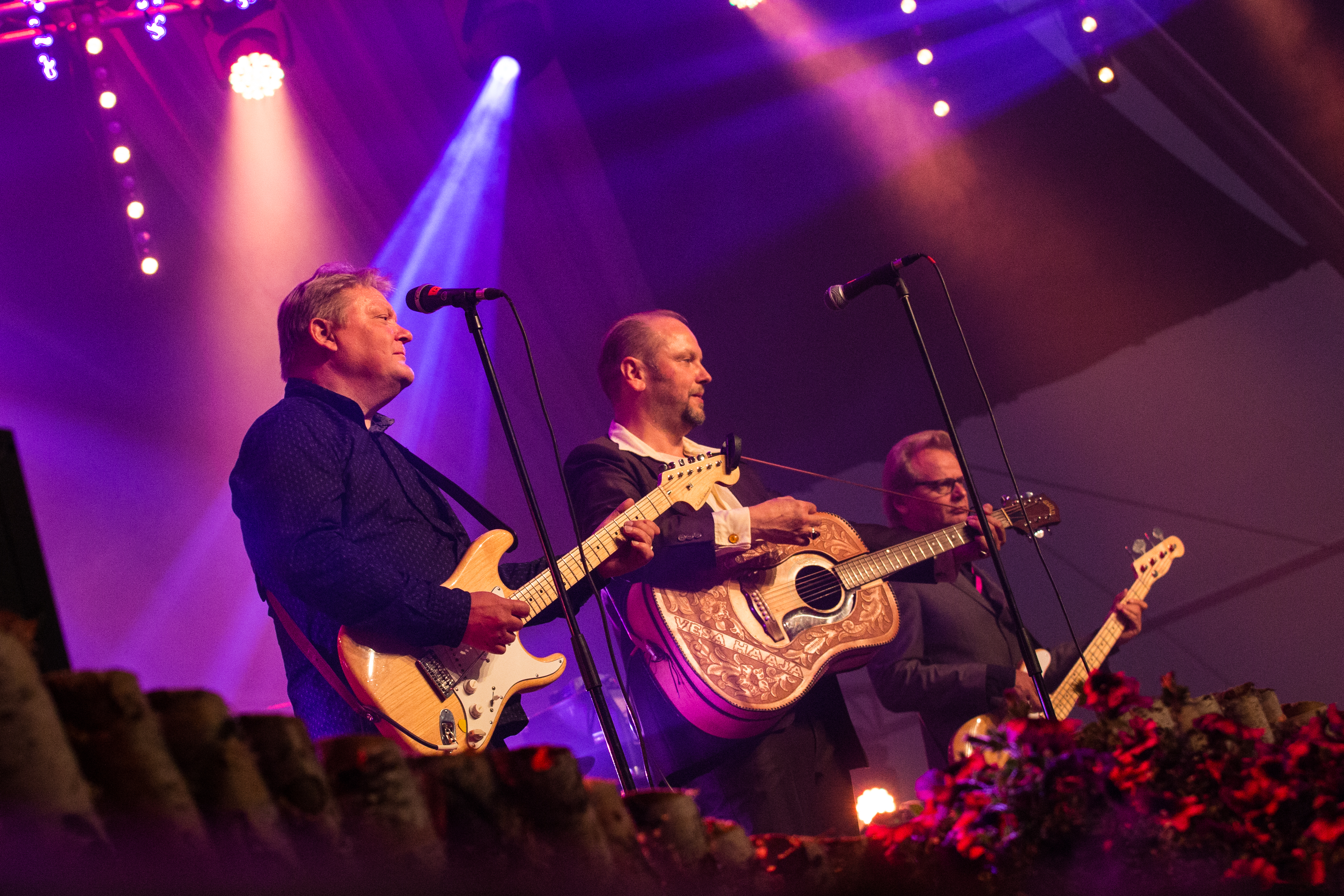
Agents performing in 2015

Agents' repertoire consists practically completely of songs originally written and performed by others. There are many reasons for Agents' popularity, but the most important ones are well chosen songs, Slavic melancholy, the lyrical guitar sound of the band's leading figure Esa Pulliainen, and the well-executed compositions he has made.

After recruiting Kääriäinen, the band has shifted its repertoire to focus more on rock'n'roll, which does not appeal to everyone. The melancholy longing feel has not been completely forgotten though, and the band is still popular at dance venues.

== Members ==
=== Original members (1979–1981) ===
- Pekka Rytkönen (vocals)
- Esa Pulliainen (lead guitar)
- Hans Etholén (rhythm guitar)
- Kai Pulliainen (bass)
- Juha Takanen (drums)
- Jukka Ollila (keyboards)

=== Members (1981–1984) ===
- Rauli Somerjoki (vocals)
- Esa Pulliainen (lead guitar)
- Hans Etholén (rhythm guitar)
- Kai Pulliainen (bass)
- Juha Takanen (drums)
- Petri Rantala (keyboards)

=== Members (1984–1985) ===
- Rauli Somerjoki (vocals)
- Esa Pulliainen (lead guitar)
- Hans Etholén (rhythm guitar)
- Kai Pulliainen (bass)
- Juha Takanen (drums)
- Eero Ojanen (keyboards)

=== Members (1985–1992) ===
- Topi Sorsakoski (vocals)
- Esa Pulliainen (lead guitar)
- Hans Etholén (rhythm guitar)
- Kai Pulliainen (bass)
- Juha Takanen (drums)

=== Members (1992–2006) ===
- Jorma Kääriäinen (vocals, rhythm guitar)
- Esa Pulliainen (solo guitar)
- Kai Pulliainen (bass)
- Heikki Sandrén (drums)
- J-P Virtanen (keyboards, on albums)

=== Members (2007) ===
- Topi Sorsakoski (vocals)
- Esa Pulliainen (solo guitar)
- Kai Pulliainen (bass)
- Heikki Sandrén (drums)
- Juho Hurskainen (saxophone)

=== Members (2008–2014) ===
- Vesa Haaja (vocals, rhythm guitar)
- Esa Pulliainen (solo guitar)
- Kai Pulliainen (bass)
- Heikki Sandrén (drums)
- Juho Hurskainen (saxophone)

=== Members (2014–2018) ===
- Vesa Haaja (vocals, rhythm guitar)
- Esa Pulliainen (solo guitar)
- Kai Pulliainen (bass)
- Jari "Kepa" Kettunen (drums)

=== Current members (2019–present) ===
- Ville Valo (vocals)
- Esa Pulliainen (solo guitar)
- Kai Pulliainen (bass)
- Jari "Kepa" Kettunen (drums)

== Discography ==
Albums

- 1980: Agents
- 1982: Ikkunaprinsessa
- 1983: Tähdet, tähdet
- 1985: Laivat
- 1986: In Beat
- 1987: Besame Mucho
- 1988: Pop
- 1990: Half and Half
- 1995: Agents Forever
- 1996: Agents Is Back!
- 1997: Agents Is More!
- 1998: Agents Is Best!
- 1999: Laulava Sydän
- 2001: Agents Is... Here!
- 2001: Agents Is... Rock! Vol 1
- 2003: Agents Is... Tonight
- 2004: Pop Show (The Boysin kanssa)
- 2006: Agents Is Allright
- 2007: Renegades
- 2008: Agents... Is Beat! – Instrumental 2008 Recordings
- 2011: Agents Go Go
- 2012: On Stage / In Studio (credited to Agents & Vesa Haaja)
- 2014: Sound on Sound (credited to Agents & Vesa Haaja)
- 2016: Blue (credited to Agents & Vesa Haaja)
- 2019: Ville Valo & Agents

Compilation albums

- 1989: Greatest Hits
- 1992: In memoriam
- 2002: Surujen kitara – 32 Greatest Hits
- 2003: In the Beginning – Johanna Years 1979–1984
- 2004: Agents & Jorma Kääriäinen... Is Best Vol. 2
- 2005: Kevyesti vaan (2005)

DVDs

- 2005: Laulava sydän
- 2008: Reunion – Live DVD

== See also ==
- List of best-selling music artists in Finland
