= Savage Garden (The 69 Eyes album) =

1995 studio album by the 69 Eyes

Studio album by The 69 Eyes
- Released: 1995
- Recorded: 1994 at Freakhouse Studios
- Genre: Proto-punk; glam rock
- Length: 42:15
- Label: Gaga Goodies, Poko Rekords

The 69 Eyes chronology
Motor City Resurrection (1994)	Savage Garden (1995)	Wrap Your Troubles in Dreams (1997)

Professional ratings
Review scores
Source	Rating
AllMusic	3/5 stars

Savage Garden is the second studio album by the Finnish rock band The 69 Eyes. It also features Andy McCoy from Hanoi Rocks on "Wild Talk". The album has traces of what would be known as their "goth n' roll" sound, as seen in their song "Velvet Touch".

== Track listing ==
1. "1-800-SLEAZORAMA" – 0:49
2. "Tang" – 3:27
3. "Smashed 'n' Trashed" – 2:55
4. "Velvet Touch" – 4:18
5. "Mr. Pain" – 2:25
6. "Lady Luck" – 3:27
7. "Motor City Resurrection" – 3:56
8. "Ghettoway Car" – 2:58
9. "Wild Talk" – feat. Andy McCoy 4:04
10. "Get It Off" – 3:16
11. "Always" – 2:47
12. "Demolition Derby" – 4:13
13. "Savage Garden" – 2:50
14. "1-800-SLEAZORAMA (reprise)" – 0:50

Bonus tracks

1. "TV Eye" (The Stooges cover) – 3:50
2. "Motormouth" – 3:03
3. "One-Shot Woman" – 3:16

== Singles ==
"Velvet Touch"

1. "Tang"
2. "Velvet Touch"
3. "TV Eye"
4. "Motormouth"

== Personnel ==
- J. Darling – vocals
- Bazie – lead guitar
- Timo-Timo – rhythm guitar
- Archzie – bass
- Jussi – drums
