= The 69 Eyes =

Finnish rock band

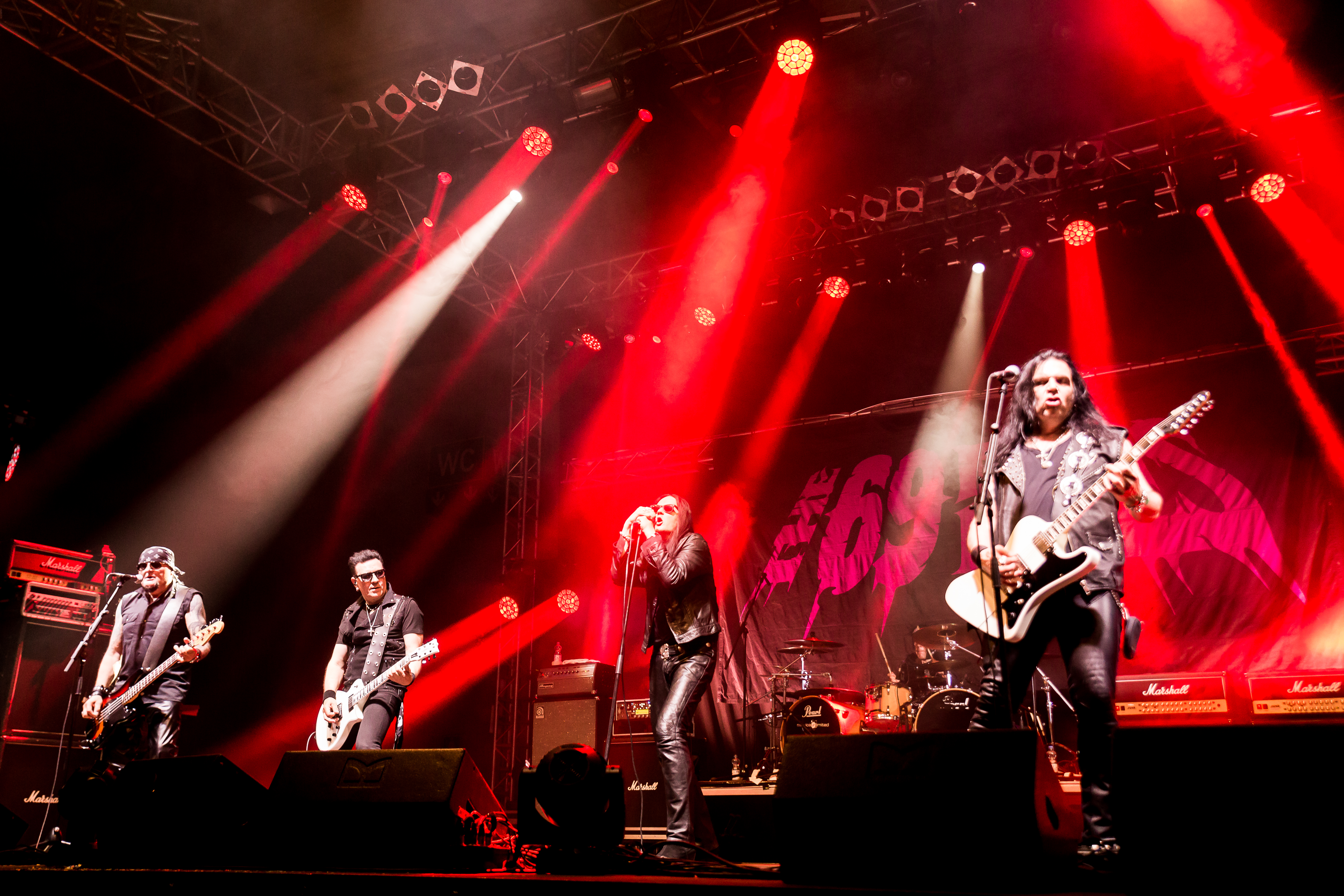
- The 69 Eyes at Wave-Gotik-Treffen 2022

Background information
- Origin: Helsinki, Finland
- Genres: Gothic rock; sleaze rock; hard rock; glam metal
- Years active: 1989–present
- Labels: Nuclear Blast; The End; Caroline/Virgin/EMI
- Members: Jyrki 69; Bazie; Timo-Timo; Archzie; Jussi 69
- Past members: Lotto
- Website: 69eyes.com

The 69 Eyes is a Finnish rock band. It was founded in 1989 in Helsinki by vocalist Jyrki 69 (who also writes the band's lyrics), guitarists Bazie, Timo-Timo and bassist Archzie, joined in 1992 by drummer Jussi 69; the lineup never changed since then. The 69 Eyes music blends gothic rock with glam metal and rock 'n roll in a style that has been dubbed "goth 'n roll".

The 69 Eyes is currently signed to EMI Finland. The band's albums are now distributed worldwide; The End Records acts as the band's official North American distributor, as Nuclear Blast Records provides distribution in Europe. Australia will be handled by AmpHead Music. All Asian and Latin American releases are handled by EMI affiliates.

== History ==
Formed in the bars of Helsinki in the summer of 1989 by Jyrki 69, Archzie (formerly of Syyskuu), Timo-Timo, Lotto and Bazie, The 69 Eyes originally had a glam metal style and were compared to other Finnish glam metal acts such as Smack and Hanoi Rocks. The band's lineup has stayed the same since 1992 when drummer Jussi 69 replaced original drummer Lotto who had played on the band's first two 7-inch vinyl singles.

The band released their first 7-inch EP, Sugarman, in 1990, followed by another 7-inch, Barbarella, in 1991. These are the only two releases that do not feature Jussi. These releases paved the way for the band's first album, Bump 'n' Grind, released in 1992, which contained some re-recorded versions of songs from the first two EPs. This same year, the band released their final two 7-inch EPs, Juicy Lucy and High Times Low Lives.

The band's second CD, Motor City Resurrection, was released in 1994 via Japanese label 1+2 Records. It has since been re-released with eight bonus tracks worldwide. Though a compilation and not a full-length release (much like Hanoi Rocks' Self Destruction Blues), it collected the majority of the band's early material and contributions to other compilations. It was followed in 1995 by Savage Garden which featured Hanoi Rocks guitarist Andy McCoy on the track "Wild Talk". Also released during this time were two VHS tapes Motor City Resurrection and Savage Tales, available only through the band's self-run fan club (the aptly titled "Get Down to 69").

1997 saw the release of Wrap Your Troubles in Dreams, which fans generally mark as the last 69 Eyes "glam-era" album. The title track of this album was re-recorded for the Angels album 10 years later. The goth rock-infused Wasting the Dawn was released in 1999 and was considered a milestone success for the band. It was released internationally on Roadrunner Records and marked the band's major label debut. The album's hit single, the title track "Wasting the Dawn", lyrically paid tribute to The Doors' Jim Morrison and was released as a digipak CD single. Jyrki 69 developed a concept video for this track which featured longtime friend and collaborator Ville Valo posing at a snowy cemetery as the ghost of Jim Morrison. This video was released on DVD in Finland with a bonus behind-the-scenes feature and marked the band's first music DVD released in the country. Both the video and feature were later added as extras on 2003's Helsinki Vampires DVD.

In early 2000, the band began working with producer Johnny Lee Michaels in Helsinki who would helm the band's next four albums and contribute to the fifth. Spring brought the single "Gothic Girl" which spent months on the Singles Top 10 and on Finnish nation radio playlists. It became the band's first gold record. This single was a precursor to the sixth album, released in September 2000, Blessed Be, which rose to number 4 on the Finnish Album Charts and stayed in the top 10 for over a month. The album spawned four singles, the aforementioned "Gothic Girl", "Brandon Lee", "The Chair" and "Stolen Season". Videos were filmed for the first three singles. After the release of Blessed Be, the band did their first short tour in Germany which included a show at the M'era Luna Festival. Support for the tour was Norwegian rock band Zeromancer.

In 2002, the band released Paris Kills, which would be known as their breakthrough album. It stayed for weeks as number 1 in Finland and went gold in a month of its release. It has since gone platinum. In Germany, it rose to number 35 in the first week. After touring Europe and Finland for months, a sold-out show at Helsinki's famous Tavastia Club was filmed and documented in November 2002 for use in the Helsinki Vampires DVD.

At the end of 2003, The 69 Eyes signed to EMI Finland as they geared up to record Devils. The "Lost Boys" single was released in Finland at this time, paying homage to the film of the same name as anticipation for the full-length album grew. 2004 saw the release of Devils, their eighth album, to which they toured the UK in support of Wednesday 13. Once again the album was a success in their native Finland. It became the band's fourth album to reach gold status and the second to reach number one position on the Finnish Top 40 album charts. It was released in Finland in October 2004 and in October 2005 in the U.S. through 456 Entertainment.

In 2005, The 69 Eyes played nearly a hundred shows around the world in fifteen countries, from Mexico to Japan. Devils was also released in the U.S. with an alternate cover from the international release. The band filmed their video "Lost Boys" in Hollywood and the Philadelphia area, directed by MTV star Bam Margera.

In March 2006, The 69 Eyes briefly toured the U.S. for the first time with Program the Dead and Damone, performing live on Last Call with Carson Daly (episode dated 31 March 2006). This marked the band's first ever U.S. television appearance.

Angels, the sequel to the 2004 album Devils, was released in Europe in March 2007. It debuted at number 1 in Finland and has since gone gold. Shortly after their tour with Cradle of Filth and 3 Inches of Blood, Angels was released on 25 June 2007 in the UK. The first single from the album was "Perfect Skin" which went straight to number 1 on the Finnish singles chart. The second single was "Never Say Die". Videos were filmed for both singles and received international airplay.

The band did a summer 2007 US tour with Wednesday 13, Night Kills the Day and Fair to Midland, and supported Within Temptation on tour in the UK in November. They played 125 shows worldwide in 2007.

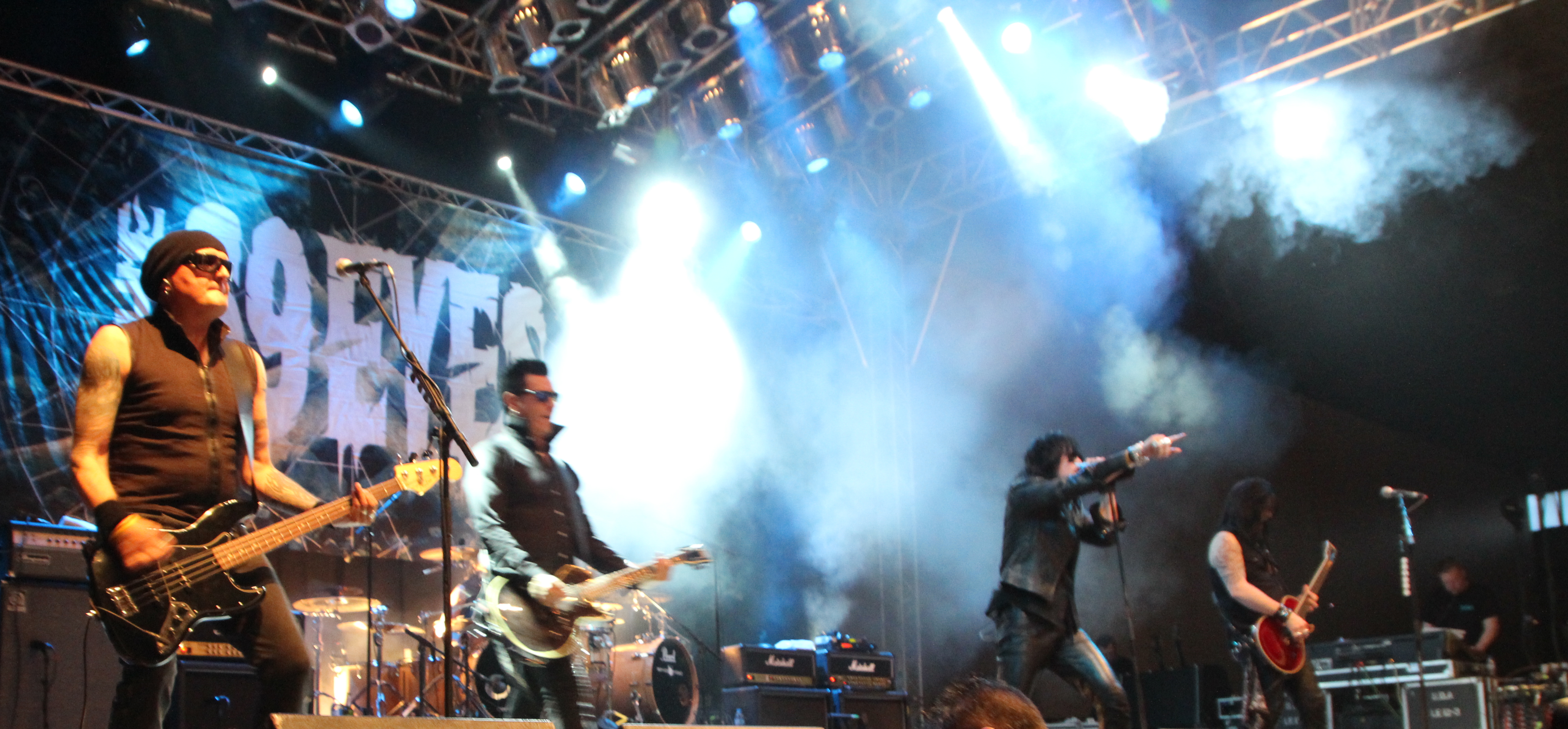
Wave-Gotik-Treffen 2013

In 2008, the band released their first live album, titled The 69 Eyes: Hollywood Kills. It featured a complete live show recorded at the Whisky a Go Go in Hollywood in March 2006. The performance featured hits spanning the six latest albums an introduction by Bam Margera and a live cover of the Ramones' "I Just Wanna Have Something to Do". The concert was also filmed in its entirety. Five tracks from the performance were released on DVD as bonus content on the Angels/Devils box set and the entire concert was released on the Back in Blood bonus DVD.

The band began 2009 by touring in Europe as a part of Hellhounds Festival with Tiamat and Ava Inferi. In early 2009, The 69 Eyes started initial recording for their ninth studio album with producer Matt Hyde. The recording process took place in Los Angeles. It was also revealed that Johnny Lee Michaels provided post-production work in Helsinki.

The new album Back in Blood was released 28 August in Europe and 15 September in the USA. In early June 2009, Bam Margera directed the music video for the first single from the album, "Dead Girls Are Easy". The video premiered on playboy.com on 17 July 2009. The 69 Eyes also toured Australia for the first time in mid-June, playing in Brisbane, Melbourne, and Sydney. A tour of the United States followed in October 2009, and Jyrki 69 was featured on both Fox News' Red Eye program as well as on CNN International. In December 2009, the band debuted their newest video for the song, "Dead & Gone", via Myspace. This new video marked the band's third collaboration with Bam Margera. On 10 August, the band revealed a contest for fans to create a video for the next single, "Kiss Me Undead", and on 30 September the band posted their 14 favorite videos on their YouTube page.

In April 2010, during an interview with Sean Twisted of Renegaderadio.net, Rudi Protrudi (frontman and founder of The Fuzztones) reported he had completed work on a new song with The 69 Eyes, although further details were unavailable during that time.

On the official The 69 Eyes webpage the band's reported a European tour with Hardcore Superstar and Crashdïet in March and April 2011.

Early in 2012, The 69 Eyes began recording their next studio album X, which was released on 28 September 2012 across Europe and on 9 October 2012 in the United States. The first single from the album was "Red" and featured a music video. The second single was "Borderline". Both singles were available before the album was released in Europe. In February 2013, the band released the singles "Love Runs Away" and "Tonight" simultaneously via iTunes. "Tonight" was released exclusively in Finland while "Love Runs Away" was released everywhere else. Both singles included two previously unreleased tracks, "Rosary Blue" and "Dracula's Castle", the latter being the song Rudi Protrudi reported he had co-written with The 69 Eyes back in 2010.

The 69 Eyes released a double-CD compilation of their radio hit singles called The Best of Helsinki Vampires in November 2013. The compilation also included a new single, "Lost Without Love".

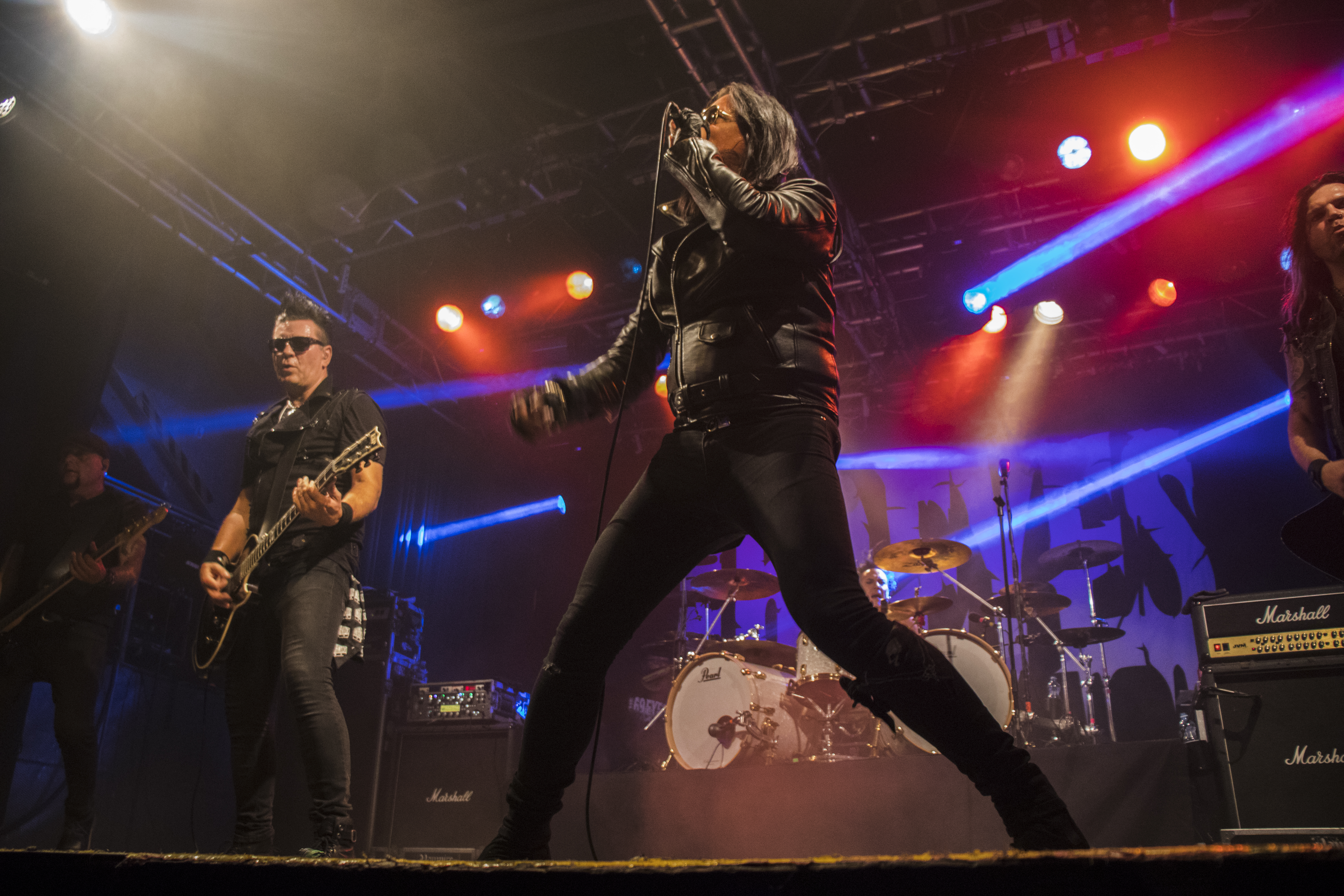
The 69 Eyes perform at their hometown Helsinki in 2019

On 29 July 2015, the band announced that they were working on a new album with producer Johnny Lee Michaels in Helsinki. Michaels previously worked with the band on four consecutive albums (Blessed Be, Paris Kills, Devils, Angels). The new album was set to be released in early 2016. They also announced the first single "Jet Fighter Plane" to be released on 15 January 2016. The second single "Dolce Vita" was released on 8 April 2016. Both singles had music videos directed by Ville Juurikkala.

The album titled Universal Monsters was released on 22 April 2016. The third single was announced to be "Jerusalem" and was released with a music video on 13 May 2016.

On 17 April 2019, the band began their first tour in the United States since 2009, ahead of the release of their upcoming album. The tour ended on 18 May in Philadelphia, making them the last national act scheduled to play at The Trocadero prior to its closure.

On 25 May 2019, The 69 Eyes announced they were to release their twelfth studio album, West End, on Friday the 13th of September 2019 via Nuclear Blast. Jyrki 69 gave a few details about the new record, saying "I feel like this planet is on some turning point. The end of the western world is near and the question is: What is happening when the west ends..? The title has multiple meanings for us… but be assured it has definitely nothing to do with The Pet Shop Boys or London." "The track deals with the idea of Hollywood and everyone coming there to make their dreams come true, but it's very seldom that they succeed and this is something you can see there everywhere", Jyrki 69 contemplates. "It's a place that makes you desperate and I wanted to get these dark vibes into the song. But on the other hand the track is also a celebration of life – we should be excited to be here and everybody's a legend and they should realise that we should enjoy what we do instead of worry what other people think." The 69 Eyes also released a behind-the-scenes video showing the recording of the record.

In February 2022, The 69 Eyes announced that they had signed to Atomic Fire Records, and two months later, they released their first song in three years, "Drive". Later that year, the band released two more songs: "Call Me Snake" and "California", the former being inspired by John Carpenter's Escape from New York and the latter having a music video accompanying its release. Both songs were included in the Drive EP that same year.

In March 2023, the music video for the single "Death of Darkness" was released. Jyrki 69 commented, "'Death Of Darkness' is a song about love. Love leads us to the light. Very simple. It sounds like it was written some twenty-five years ago. It's melancholic goth rock like we knew it in 2001." The studio album Death of Darkness was released April 21, 2023.

Eleven months later, The 69 Eyes collaborated with American songwriter Diane Warren and released the power balled "Fade To Grey" on March 22, 2024.

== Musical style ==
Initially, the 69 Eyes' music style was of glam metal influenced by acts such as Mötley Crüe and Hanoi Rocks. However, they began to incorporate more influence from gothic rock bands such as the Mission, the Cult, the Sisters of Mercy and the Lords of the New Church. Their sound was described as a mix of the gloominess of gothic rock with guitar-powered rock 'n' roll. Their music continued to show further influence from other rock artists such as the Doors, Elvis Presley and Billy Idol as well as vampire films and literature. The term "goth 'n roll" is used by fans to describe their style. They are often described as a dark rock band, a term which the band has embraced. In recent times, with the release of Back in Blood, they have moved back to a more guitar-based sound, although gothic imagery and lyrical themes remain forefront in their style.

The 69 Eyes lyrics are often inspired by movies, especially gothic, horror, western and mystery films such as The Lost Boys, The Crow, Only Lovers Left Alive, The Last House on the Left and The Outsiders, among many others. According to Jyrki, "half of The 69 Eyes songs are wannabe movie songs".

== Members ==
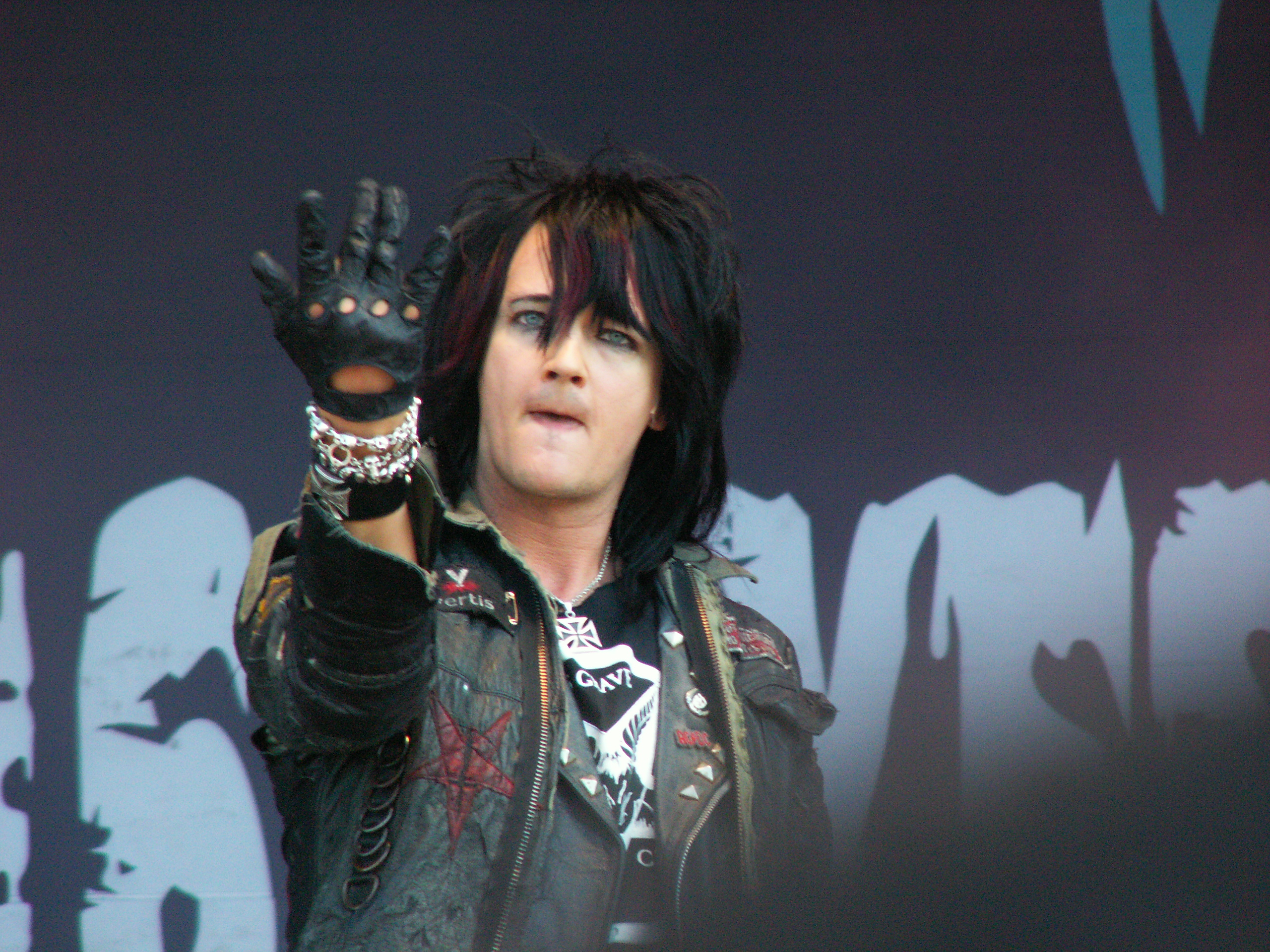
Lead vocalist Jyrki 69, who also writes the band's lyrics

- Jyrki 69 (Jyrki Pekka Emil Linnankivi) – lead vocals (1989–present)
- Bazie (Pasi Moilanen) – lead guitar, backing vocals (1989–present)
- Timo-Timo (Timo Tapio Pitkänen) – rhythm guitar (1989–present)
- Archzie (Arto Väinö Ensio Ojajärvi) – bass, backing vocals (1989–present)
- Jussi 69 (Jussi Heikki Tapio Vuori) – drums (1992–present)

=== Former members ===
- Lotto – drums (1989–1992)

== Discography ==
- Bump 'n' Grind (1992)
- Motor City Resurrection (1994) (compilation)
- Savage Garden (1995)
- Wrap Your Troubles in Dreams (1997)
- Wasting the Dawn (1999)
- Blessed Be (2000)
- Paris Kills (2002)
- Devils (2004)
- Angels (2007)
- Back in Blood (2009)
- X (2012)
- Universal Monsters (2016)
- West End (2019)
- Death of Darkness (2023)
