= Paris Kills =

Studio album by The 69 Eyes
- Released: 2002
- Genre: Gothic rock
- Length: 42:00
- Labels: Gaga Goodies, Poko Rekords

The 69 Eyes chronology
Blessed Be (2000)	Paris Kills (2002)	Framed in Blood - The Very Blessed of the 69 Eyes (2003)

Paris Kills is the 2002 studio album by Finnish gothic rock band The 69 Eyes. A No. 1 best seller in Finland, the album achieved Gold Record status within a month of its release. It was their sixth studio album and was released in 2002 on Gaga Goodies / Poko Rekords and re-released in 2007 on Cleopatra Records.

The first single from Paris Kills was "Dance d'amour", which was pre-released and received radio airplay prior to the album's release.

== Track listing ==
1. "Crashing High" – 3:54
2. "Dance d'Amour" – 3:56
3. "Betty Blue" (feat. Ville Valo) – 3:37
4. "Grey" – 4:16
5. "Radical" – 3:52
6. "Don't Turn Your Back on Fear" – 3:45
7. "Stigmata" (feat. Ville Valo) – 4:23
8. "Forever More" – 4:10
9. "Still Waters Run Deep" (feat. Ville Valo) – 4:10
10. "Dawn's Highway" – 6:08

Bonus tracks

1. "You're Lost Little Girl" – 4:42
2. "Crashing High" (Remix) – 3:55
3. "Stigmata" (Gothic Mix) – 6:14

Enhanced part – Russian edition

1. "Betty Blue" (video)
2. "Dance d'Amour" (video)

== Singles ==
Dance d'Amour

1. "Dance d'Amour"
2. "You're Lost Little Girl"

Betty Blue

1. "Betty Blue"
2. "Grey" (Radio Live)
3. "Don't Turn Your Black on Fear" (Radio Live)

Crashing High

1. "Crashing High"
2. "Stigmata (Gothic) Remix"
3. "Stigmata (Demonic) Remix"
4. "Stigmata (Prophecy) Remix"

== Reception ==
A 2002 review in Soundi said (in Finnish) that Paris Kills would "likely fill one of its most important tasks in exemplary fashion – turning as many new fans as possible towards the world of The 69 Eyes." In search of potential hit material from the album, the review identified the first three tracks – "Dance d'amour", "Betty Blue", and "Crashing High" – as among the strongest, calling the "Crashing High" "irresisible" and "Billy Idol-inspired".
