= Blessed Be =

Studio album by the 69 Eyes
- Released: 2000
- Genre: Gothic rock
- Length: 44:45
- Labels: Gaga Goodies, Poko Rekords

The 69 Eyes chronology
Wasting the Dawn (1999)	Blessed Be (2000)	Paris Kills (2002)

Professional ratings
Review scores
Source	Rating
AllMusic	1.5/5 stars
Metal Storm	8.5/10 stars

Blessed Be is the fifth studio album by Finnish rock band the 69 Eyes, released in 2000 by Gaga Goodies/Poko Rekords. The first single was "Gothic Girl", followed by "Brandon Lee".

There are many references throughout the album to the 1990s cult film and comic book The Crow. For example, Brandon Lee, the lead actor who was shot and killed by accident while on the set, is also the name of the fourth track on the album. The song is a tribute to his memory.

The song "Velvet Touch" is a re-recording of a song from the band's second studio album Savage Garden.

== Track listing ==
1. "Framed in Blood" – 3:45
2. "Gothic Girl" – 4:22
3. "The Chair" (feat. Ville Valo) – 4:09
4. "Brandon Lee" – 3:28
5. "Velvet Touch" – 4:38
6. "Sleeping with Lions" – 3:44
7. "Angel on My Shoulder" (feat. Ville Valo) – 3:55
8. "Stolen Season" – 4:33
9. "Wages of Sin" – 4:08
10. "Graveland" – 5:06
11. "30" – 2:59

Bonus tracks

1. "Heaven/Hell"
2. "Brandon Lee" (Radio Mix)

Bonus CD limited collectors edition

1. "Heaven/Hell" – 3:42
2. "Brandon Lee" (Radio Mix) – 3:11
3. "The Chair" (Club Mix) – 8:20
4. "Gothic Girl" (Video) – 3:45
5. "Brandon Lee" (Video) – 3:30
6. "The Chair" (Video) – 4:10

== Singles ==
"Gothic Girl"

1. "Gothic Girl"
2. "Velvet Touch"

"Brandon Lee"

1. "Brandon Lee" (Radio Mix)
2. "Brandon Lee"
3. "Brandon Lee" (Video)

"The Chair"

1. "The Chair" (Edit)
2. "Heaven/Hell"
3. "The Chair" (Club Mix)

"Stolen Season"

1. "Stolen Season" (Radio Edit)
2. "The Chair" (Video)

== Soundtracks ==
Orkus Presents the Best of 2000

1. "The 69 Eyes: 'Gothic Girl'"
