= Devils (The 69 Eyes album) =

Studio album by The 69 Eyes
- Released: 22 October 2004
- Studio: Helsinki Underground Studios; Hip Studios
- Genre: Gothic rock; hard rock
- Length: 42:25
- Label: Virgin Records / EMI

The 69 Eyes chronology
Framed in Blood – The Very Blessed of the 69 Eyes (2003)	Devils (2004)	Angels (2007)

Professional ratings
Review scores
Source	Rating
AllMusic	3.5/5 stars

Devils is the seventh studio album by the Finnish rock band The 69 Eyes released on 22 October 2004 on Virgin / EMI. It is their first CD to be released in North America.

== Track listing ==
1. "Devils" – 3:52
2. "Feel Berlin" – 4:09
3. "Nothing on You" – 4:10
4. "Sister of Charity" – 5:04
5. "Lost Boys" – 3:23
6. "Jimmy" – 3:10
7. "August Moon" – 3:37
8. "Beneath the Blue" (feat. Ville Valo) – 3:13
9. "Christina Death" – 4:02
10. "Hevioso" – 4:12
11. "Only You Can Save Me" – 3:33

Bonus tracks

1. "From Dusk 'Til Dawn"
2. "Pitchblack"

== Singles ==
Lost Boys

1. "Lost Boys" – 3:25

Devils

1. "Devils" – 4:00
2. "From Dusk 'Til Dawn" – 3:22

Feel Berlin

1. "Feel Berlin" (Edit) – 3:58
2. "Pitchblack" – 4:49
3. "Devils" (Video)

Feel Berlin – Maxi Single

1. "Feel Berlin" (Radio Edit) – 3:58
2. "Feel Berlin" (Original Version) – 4:07
3. "From Dusk Till Dawn" – 3:22
4. "Feel Berlin"(Live) – 4:42
5. "Lost Boys"(Live) – 4:43

Sister of Charity

1. "Sister of Charity" – 5:04
2. "Lost Boys" (Video)
