= Wasting the Dawn =

Studio album by The 69 Eyes
- Released: 1999; 2 March 2007 (US)
- Recorded: November–December 1998
- Genre: Hard rock; gothic rock; glam metal
- Length: 50:40
- Label: Gaga Goodies, Poko Rekords

The 69 Eyes chronology
Wrap Your Troubles in Dreams (1997)	Wasting the Dawn (1999)	Blessed Be (2000)

Professional ratings
Review scores
Source	Rating
Kerrang!	2/5 stars

Wasting the Dawn is the fourth studio album by The 69 Eyes, released in 1999, produced by Gaga Goodies / Poko Rekords.

It was released internationally on Roadrunner Records.

The album's hit single, "Wasting the Dawn", paid tribute to The Doors' Jim Morrison. The video featured HIM member Ville Valo posing at a snowy cemetery as the ghost of Morrison. The title song is based on a line from "The WASP (Texas Radio and the Big Beat)", a song from The Doors' 1971 album L.A. Woman. Valo also contributed backup singing. The album continues the 69 Eyes' development from glam metal to gothic rock, at first notable on their previous album, Wrap Your Troubles in Dreams.

== Track listing ==
1. "Truck On" – 3:13
2. "Lay Down Your Arms" (feat. Ville Valo) – 3:41
3. "Wasting the Dawn" (feat. Ville Valo) – 5:21
4. "You Ain't the Reason" – 4:11
5. "Lazarus Heart" (feat. Ville Valo) – 4:25
6. "Who's Gonna Pay the Bail?" (feat. Alex Hellid & Lars-Göran Petrov of Entombed) – 5:05
7. "All-American Dream" (feat. Ville Valo) – 4:22
8. "Be My Speed" – 4:38
9. "Hand of God" (feat. Lars-Göran Petrov) – 4:26
10. "Next Stop Paradise" – 4:26
11. "Starshine" – 6:52

=== Bonus tracks ===
1. "Lay Down Your Arms" (Remix) – 3:43
2. "Wasting the Dawn" (Remix) – 5:26
3. "Next Stop Paradise" (Remix) – 4:28

== Singles ==
"Wasting the Dawn"

1. "Wasting the Dawn" (Radio Edit)
2. "Wasting the Dawn"
3. "You Ain't the Reason"

== Soundtracks ==
Orkus Presents the Best of 1999

1. "The 69 Eyes: "Wasting the Dawn"

Sonic Seducer - Like a Taste of Sin!

1. "The 69 Eyes: "Wasting the Dawn"
