= Back in Blood (album) =

Studio album by The 69 Eyes
- Released: 28 August 2009 (Europe); 31 August 2009 (Australia); 15 September 2009 (US)
- Genre: Hard rock; gothic rock; glam rock
- Length: 48:38
- Label: Nuclear Blast (Europe); The End Records (USA); AmpHead Music (Australia); EMI (Finland)
- Producer: Matt Hyde

The 69 Eyes chronology
Angels (2007)	Back in Blood (2009)	X (2012)

Professional ratings
Review scores
Source	Rating
Type 3 Media	7.5/10 stars
Metal Hammer	8/10 stars
Allmusic	3/5 stars

Back in Blood is the ninth studio album from Finnish rock band The 69 Eyes and their first to be released via Nuclear Blast in Europe and The End Records in North America. The album was recorded in both Helsinki and Los Angeles and produced by Matt Hyde. The cover art was designed by Estevan Oriol. Lyrically, the whole album deals with themes of vampires and blood.

== Track listing ==
1. "Back in Blood" – 4:30
2. "We Own the Night" – 4:03
3. "Dead N' Gone" (feat. Benji Madden) – 3:40
4. "The Good, the Bad & the Undead" – 3:28
5. "Kiss Me Undead" – 3:58
6. "Lips of Blood" – 4:21
7. "Dead Girls Are Easy" – 3:55
8. "Night Watch" – 4:33
9. "Some Kind of Magick" – 3:43
10. "Hunger" – 4:34
11. "Suspiria Snow White" – 3:34
12. "Eternal" – 4:19

=== Bonus DVD Vampire Edition ===
1. "Dead Girls Are Easy" (Music Video)
2. "Devils" (Live)
3. "Don't Turn Your Back on Fear" (Live)
4. "Betty Blue" (Live)
5. "Christina Death" (Live)
6. "Crashing High" (Live)
7. "The Chair" (Live)
8. "Feel Berlin" (Live)
9. "Gothic Girl" (Live)
10. "Sister of Charity" (Live)
11. "Framed in Blood" (Live)
12. "Lost Boys" (Live)
13. "I Just Want to Have Something to Do" (Live)
14. "Brandon Lee" (Live)
15. "Back In Blood" (Electronic Press Kit)
16. "Extra Video Material And Web Links"

== Charts ==
Chart (2009)	Peak position
Finnish Albums Chart	3

== Singles ==
Dead Girls Are Easy

1. "Dead Girls Are Easy" – 3:51

Dead N' Gone

1. "Dead N' Gone" – 3:36

We Own the Night

1. "We Own the Night" – 3:59

Kiss Me Undead

1. "Kiss Me Undead" – 3:54

== Miscellaneous ==
- The song "Dead Girls Are Easy" world-premiered at the Sirius radioshow Radio Bam on 8 June 2009, where the 69 Eyes appeared. The song was later uploaded to the band's Myspace on 17 June.
- The music video for first single for the album, "Dead Girls Are Easy", was directed by Bam Margera, and was filmed in June 2009. The video features an appearance by Missy Margera and premiered on playboy.com on 17 July 2009.
- The second single from the new 69 Eyes album will be "Dead N' Gone". The band shot a video for it with Bam Margera directing in San Francisco on the weekend before the tour. "This is the coolest video we're ever done, San Francisco is such an amazing background for it!" says Jyrki. The video also features Benji Madden who also contributed backing vocals on the song.
- The third single "We Own the Night" was released March 2010. It was featured as a bonus track on the digital version of the soundtrack for Saw VI.
- For the fourth single, "Kiss Me Undead," the band held a contest for their fans to create original music videos for the single and vote for their favorite video. The contest began May 2010 and ended a few months later in October. The winner received a merchandise package and got to chat with Jyrki69 via Skype.
