= HIM discography =

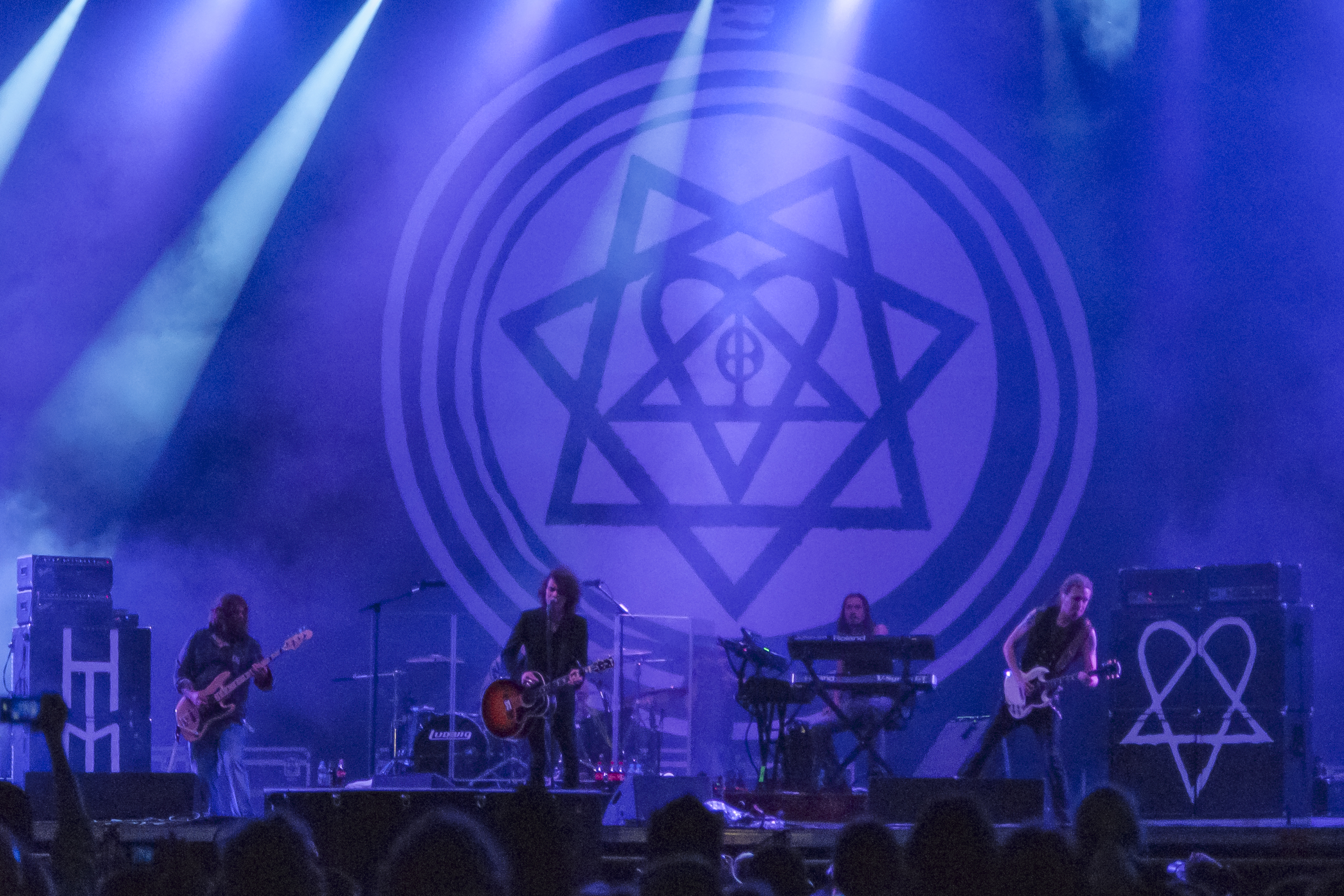
- HIM performing at Ursynalia in 2013
- Studio albums: 8
- Extended plays: 1
- Live albums: 1
- Compilation albums: 8
- Singles: 28
- Video albums: 3
- Music videos: 29

Finnish gothic rock band HIM has released eight studio albums, one live album, eight compilation albums, one EP, twenty-eight singles, three video albums, and twenty-nine music videos. Formed in 1991 by vocalist Ville Valo and bassist Mikko "Mige" Paananen under the name His Infernal Majesty, the band broke up in 1993, but was reformed in 1995 by Valo and guitarist Mikko "Linde" Lindström. After being rejoined by Mige, as well new additions keyboardist Antto Melasniemi, rhythm guitarist Oki and drummer Juhana "Pätkä" Rantala, the band, now called HIM, signed to BMG, and released the EP 666 Ways to Love: Prologue in 1996. The EP charted at number nine on the Finnish Singles Chart, and in 1997, the band, sans Oki, released their debut album Greatest Lovesongs Vol. 666, which was certified gold and later platinum in Finland. In 2000, now with drummer Mika "Gas Lipstick" Karppinen and keyboardist Juska Salminen, the band released the album Razorblade Romance, which was certified double platinum in Finland, triple gold in Germany and gold in Austria. Its first single, "Join Me in Death", also charted at number-one in Finland and Germany, eventually going platinum in their home country and gold in Germany and Austria. Following the addition of Janne "Burton" Puurtinen on keyboards, HIM released Deep Shadows and Brilliant Highlights and Love Metal in 2001 and 2003 respectively. Both were certified platinum in Finland, as well as gold in Austria and Germany respectively.

After relocating to Los Angeles, HIM released Dark Light in 2005, which became the group's most successful album to date, charting in sixteen countries. With Dark Light, HIM also became the first Finnish group to receive a gold album in the United States. Dark Light was followed by Venus Doom in 2007, the making of which was marred by problems in Valo's personal life. Despite this, the album was certified gold in Finland and gave the band their highest chart position in the US at number twelve. After 2010's Screamworks: Love in Theory and Practice, which was once again certified gold in Finland, HIM went on hiatus as drummer Gas Lipstick took medical leave. Following several months of uncertainty, the band regrouped and eventually released the album Tears on Tape in 2013, which charted in nine countries. In 2015, Gas Lipstick announced his departure from the band to pursue other musical projects, and was subsequently replaced by Jukka "Kosmo" Kröger. On 5 March 2017, HIM announced that the band would be disbanding following a farewell tour in 2017.

HIM is internationally one of the most commercially successful Finnish bands of all time, with sales of over ten million records. HIM's music and their logo, the heartagram, have also appeared in several films and TV series, such as The Thirteenth Floor, Transformers, Jackass, CKY, Viva La Bam, LA Ink, Haggard, and Charmed.

== Albums ==
=== Studio albums ===
Title	Album details	Chart positions										Sales	Certifications
Title	Album details	FIN	AUS	AUT	GER	NED	SPA	SWE	SWI	UK	US	Sales	Certifications
Greatest Lovesongs Vol. 666	Released: 3 November 1997; Label: BMG	2	—	—	50	—	—	—	—	—	—		IFPI FIN: Platinum
Razorblade Romance	Released: 24 January 2000; Label: BMG	1	—	1	1	78	—	—	8	—	—		IFPI FIN: 2× Platinum; BPI: Silver; BVMI: 3× Gold; IFPI AUT: Gold
Deep Shadows and Brilliant Highlights	Released: 27 August 2001; Label: BMG	1	—	1	2	—	—	44	2	—	190		IFPI FIN: Platinum; BVMI: Gold; IFPI AUT: Gold
Love Metal	Released: 11 April 2003; Label: BMG	1	—	5	1	—	—	11	4	55	117		IFPI FIN: Platinum; BVMI: Gold; BPI: Gold
Dark Light	Released: 26 September 2005; Label: Sire	1	40	4	4	25	10	7	8	18	18		IFPI FIN: Platinum; BPI: Gold; BVMI: Gold; RIAA: Gold
Venus Doom	Released: 14 September 2007; Label: Sire	2	32	9	3	36	22	12	5	31	12	US: 90,000	IFPI FIN: Gold
Screamworks: Love in Theory and Practice	Released: 8 February 2010; Label: Sire	2	36	7	4	44	27	21	7	50	25		IFPI FIN: Gold
Tears on Tape	Released: 26 April 2013; Label: DoubleCross, Razor & Tie, Universal Finland	2	65	7	2	89	31	48	22	—	15	US: 39,000	
"—" denotes a release that did not chart or a value that is not applicable.

=== Live albums ===
Title	Album details	Chart positions					
Title	Album details	FIN	AUS	AUT	GER	SWE	US
Digital Versatile Doom	Released: 1 April 2008; Label: Sire	10	48	35	37	59	168

=== Remix albums ===
Title	Album details
SWRMXS	Released: 7 December 2010; Label: Sire

=== Compilation albums ===
Title	Album details	Chart positions												Certifications
Title	Album details	FIN	AUT	BEL	GER	ITA	NED	NOR	POR	SWE	SWI	UK	US	Certifications
And Love Said No: The Greatest Hits 1997–2004	Released: 15 March 2004; Label: BMG	2	9	98	5	55	71	32	11	20	18	30	—	IFPI FIN: Platinum; BPI: Gold; BVMI: Gold
Uneasy Listening Vol. 1	Released: 27 October 2006; Label: Sony BMG	7	—	—	37	—	—	—	—	55	40	—	162	
Uneasy Listening Vol. 2	Released: 20 April 2007; Label: Sony BMG	12	—	—	38	—	—	—	—	33	61	—	—	
Uneasy Listening Vol. 1 & 2	Released: 9 November 2007; Label: Sony BMG	—	—	—	—	—	—	—	—	—	—	—	—	
XX – Two Decades of Love Metal	Released: 29 October 2012; Label: Sony Music, The End	4	—	—	98	—	—	—	—	—	—	—	—	
"—" denotes a release that did not chart or a value that is not applicable.

== Box sets ==
Title	Album	Chart positions
Title	Album	FIN
The Single Collection	Released: 7 October 2002; Label: BMG	12
Lashes to Ashes, Lust to Dust: A Vinyl Retrospective '96-'03	Released: 23 December 2014; Label: The End	—
"—" denotes a release that did not chart or a value that is not applicable.

== Extended plays ==
Title	EP details	Chart positions
Title	EP details	FIN
666 Ways to Love: Prologue	Released: 16 October 1996; Label: BMG	9

== Singles ==
Year	Title	Chart positions										Certifications	Album
Year	Title	FIN	AUT	GER	IRE	ITA	SPA	SWE	SWI	UK	US	Certifications	Album
1997	"When Love and Death Embrace"	9	—	—	—	—	—	—	—	—	—		Greatest Lovesongs Vol. 666
1998	"Your Sweet Six Six Six"	7	—	—	—	—	—	—	—	—	—		Greatest Lovesongs Vol. 666
1998	"Wicked Game"	—	—	—	—	—	—	—	—	—	—		Greatest Lovesongs Vol. 666
1999	"Join Me in Death"	1	2	1	—	30	15	52	8	—	—	IFPI FIN: Platinum; BVMI: Gold; IFPI AUT: Gold	Razorblade Romance
2000	"Right Here in My Arms"	1	—	22	—	—	—	—	45	—	—	IFPI FIN: Gold	Razorblade Romance
2000	"Poison Girl"	3	—	34	—	—	—	—	—	—	—		Razorblade Romance
2000	"Gone with the Sin"	1	—	19	—	—	—	—	89	—	—		Razorblade Romance
2001	"Pretending"	1	36	10	—	—	4	—	32	—	—	IFPI FIN: Gold	Deep Shadows and Brilliant Highlights
2001	"In Joy and Sorrow"	2	—	17	—	—	—	—	98	—	—		Deep Shadows and Brilliant Highlights
2002	"Heartache Every Moment & Close to the Flame"	2	—	20	—	—	—	—	88	—	—		Deep Shadows and Brilliant Highlights
2003	"The Funeral of Hearts"	1	26	3	45	—	—	—	24	15	—		Love Metal
2003	"Buried Alive by Love"	—	66	27	—	—	—	—	98	30	—		Love Metal
2003	"The Sacrament"	4	47	22	—	—	—	—	71	23	—		Love Metal
2004	"Solitary Man"	2	45	17	44	—	—	37	40	9	—		And Love Said No: The Greatest Hits 1997–2004
2004	"And Love Said No"	2	—	—	—	—	—	—	—	—	—		And Love Said No: The Greatest Hits 1997–2004
2005	"Wings of a Butterfly"	1	12	10	35	20	3	12	28	10	87		Dark Light
2006	"Killing Loneliness"	2	56	32	45	—	—	—	44	26	—		Dark Light
2006	"In Joy and Sorrow / Pretending"	1	—	—	—	—	—	—	—	—	—		Uneasy Listening Vol. 1
2007	"The Kiss of Dawn"	2	—	44	—	—	—	30	—	59	—		Venus Doom
2007	"Bleed Well"	—	—	—	—	—	—	—	—	—	—		Venus Doom
2009	"Heartkiller"	5	56	34	—	—	—	—	—	—	—		Screamworks: Love in Theory and Practice
2010	"Scared to Death"	—	—	—	—	—	—	—	—	—	—		Screamworks: Love in Theory and Practice
2012	"Strange World"	—	—	—	—	—	—	—	—	—	—		XX – Two Decades of Love Metal
2013	"Tears on Tape"	—	—	—	—	—	—	—	—	—	—		Tears on Tape
2013	"Into the Night"	—	—	—	—	—	—	—	—	—	—		Tears on Tape
"—" denotes a release that did not chart or a value that is not applicable.

== Videos ==
=== Video albums ===
Title	Album details	Chart positions						Certifications
Title	Album details	FIN	AUS	AUT	GER	SWE	US	Certifications
The Video Collection: 1997–2003	Released: 7 December 2004; Label: Universal Records, Jimmy Franks Recording Company	—	—	—	—	—	—	
Love Metal Archives Vol. I	Released: 25 April 2005; Label: Sony BMG	1	—	—	15	—	—	IFPI FIN: Platinum; BPI: Gold
Digital Versatile Doom	Released: 1 April 2008; Label: Sire	10	48	35	37	59	168	
"—" denotes a release that did not chart or a value that is not applicable.

=== Music videos ===
Year	Title	Director(s)
1996	"Wicked Game" (version 1)	Antto Melasniemi
1998	"When Love and Death Embrace"	Mikko Pitkänen
1998	"Wicked Game" (version 2)	Markus Walter
1999	"Join Me in Death" (version 1)	Robert Wilde
2000	"Right Here in My Arms"	Pasi Pauni
2000	"Poison Girl"	—^{[A]}
2000	"Join Me in Death" (version 2)	John Hillcoat
2000	"Wicked Game" (version 3)	Bill Yükich
2000	"Gone with the Sin"	Ercin Filizli
2000	"Gone with the Sin" (version 2)	—
2001	"Pretending"	Kevin Godley
2001	"In Joy and Sorrow"	John Hillcoat
2001	"Heartache Every Moment"	—^{[A]}
2002	"Close to the Flame"	—^{[A]}
2003	"The Funeral of Hearts"	Stefan Lindfors
2003	"Buried Alive by Love"	Bam Margera
2004	"The Sacrament"	Bam Margera
2004	"Solitary Man"	Bam Margera
2004	"And Love Said No"	Bam Margera
2005	"Wings of a Butterfly"	Meiert Avis
2005	"Killing Loneliness" (version 1)	Noble Jones
2006	"Killing Loneliness" (version 2)	Nathan Cox
2007	"The Kiss of Dawn"	Meiert Avis
2007	"Bleed Well"	Meiert Avis
2010	"Heartkiller"	James Copeman
2010	"Scared to Death"	Eugene Riecansky
2012	"Strange World"	Eugene Riecansky
2013	"Tears on Tape"	Stefan Lindfors
2013	"All Lips Go Blue"	Eugene Riecansky
2013	"Into the Night"	Stefan Lindfors

Notes A No set video director; video consisted of tour footage.

== Other appearances ==
Year	Song	Album
1999	"Join Me in Death"	The Thirteenth Floor (soundtrack)
2000	"Razorblade Kiss"	Restless (soundtrack)
2001	"Rendezvous with Anus"	Alpha Motherfuckers
2001	"Bury Me Deep Inside Your Heart"	Salatut elämät (soundtrack)
2001	"Close to the Flame"	Me and Morrison (soundtrack)
2003	"Lose You Tonight", "Pretending", "Beautiful", "Again"	Haggard: The Movie (soundtrack)
2004	"Join Me in Death"	Resident Evil: Apocalypse (soundtrack)
2004	"The Path"	Honey Baby (soundtrack)
2005	"Wicked Game"	Smallville, Vol. 2: Metropolis Mix (soundtrack)
2005	"Soul on Fire"	Ozzfest: 10th Anniversary
2005	"Soul on Fire"	Viva la Bands
2007	"Wings of a Butterfly"	In the Name of the King (soundtrack)
2007	"Passion's Killing Floor"	Transformers: The Album (soundtrack)
2007	"The Sacrament"	Highlander: The Search for Vengeance (soundtrack)
