= Love Metal Archives Vol. I =

Love Metal Archives Vol.1

Video by HIM
- Released: 2005
- Recorded: 1996–2005
- Genre: Rock (see HIM's genre)
- Label: BMG
- Director: Teemu Järvinen
- Producer: Teemu Järvinen

HIM chronology
And Love Said No: The Greatest Hits 1997-2004 - Live at the Semifinal (2004)	Love Metal Archives Vol.1 (2005)	Digital Versatile Doom (2008)

Professional ratings
Review scores
Source	Rating
AllMusic	link

Love Metal Archives Vol. 1 is a DVD compilation by Finnish band HIM, released in 2005 and featuring all the videos up until the And Love Said No: The Greatest Hits 1997-2004 compilation. This is the second DVD compilation released by HIM. The DVD is titled Love Metal as the last studio album before this was Love Metal.

== Track listing ==
1. Main Menu
2. "When Love and Death Embrace"
3. "Wicked Game" (1996 Park Version)
4. "Wicked Game" (German Version)
5. "Wicked Game" (Razorblade Romance Version)
6. "Join Me in Death" (Ice version)
7. "Right Here in My Arms"
8. "Poison Girl" (Live 2001 Video)
9. "Gone with the Sin"
10. "Pretending"
11. "In Joy and Sorrow"
12. "Heartache Every Moment"
13. "Buried Alive by Love"
14. "The Funeral of Hearts"
15. "The Sacrament"
16. "Solitary Man"
17. "And Love Said No"
18. "Close to the Flame"
19. "Wicked Game" (Live, Viva Overdrive show '98)
20. "Your Sweet Six Six Six" (Live, Viva Overdrive show '98)
21. "When Love and Death Embrace" (Live, Viva Overdrive show '98)
22. "Rebel Yell" (Live, Provinssi Rock '99) (Billy Idol cover)
23. "Right Here in My Arms" (Live, Arena Berlin 2000)
24. "Bury Me Deep Inside Your Heart" (Live, Arena Berlin 2000)
25. "Razorblade Kiss" (Live, Arena Berlin 2000)
26. "Join Me in Death" (Live, Arena Berlin 2000)
27. "Join Me in Death" (Live, no date/venue [13th floor])
28. Razorblade Romance Album Review
29. "Pretending" (Live, Rock AM Ring, '01)
30. "In Joy and Sorrow" (Live, Rock AM Ring, '01)
31. "Heartache Every Moment" (Live, Rock AM Ring, '01)
32. "Lose You Tonight (Live, Caribia Hotel-Turku '02)
33. "Close to the Flame (Live, Caribia Hotel-Turku '02)
34. "Heartache Every Moment" (Haggard cut Video)
35. "Buried Alive by Love" (Live, Semifinal '03)
36. "The Funeral of Hearts" (Live, Semifinal '03)
37. "The Sacrament" (Live, MTV/no date)
38. "The Funeral of Hearts" (Live, MTV/no date)
39. "Sweet Pandemonium" (Live, Lycabettus Theatre '03)
40. Love Metal Album Review
41. "Your Sweet Six Six Six" (Live, Tavastia Club-Helsinki '03)
42. "It's All Tears (Drown in This Love)" (Live, Tavastia Club '03)
43. "Poison Girl" (Live, Tavastia Club-Helsinki '03)
44. "Solitary Man" (Live, Tavastia Club-Helsinki '03)
45. "Sweet Pandemonium" (Live, Tavastia Club-Helsinki '03)
46. "And Love Said No" (Live, Tavastia Club-Helsinki '03)
47. "Gone with the Sin" (Live, Tavastia Club-Helsinki '03)
48. "Our Diabolical Rapture" (Live, no date/venue)
49. "Hand of Doom" (Live, no date/venue) (Black Sabbath cover)
50. The Making of "The Funeral of Hearts"
51. "Beyond Redemption" (Live, Record Release-Hamburg '03)
52. "Soul on Fire" (Live, Record Release-Hamburg '03)
53. "This Fortress of Tears" (Live, Record Release-Hamburg '03)
54. "Soul on Fire (Live, Semifinal '03)
55. Greatest Love Songs Vol. 666 Biography
56. Razorblade Romance Biography
57. Deep Shadows and Brilliant Highlights Biography
58. Love Metal Biography
59. And Love Said No Biography
60. This contains a run of all 15 Videos labelled on the DVD*
61. This contains a run of all 24 Live Videos labelled on the DVD*
62. Credits
63. More Credits
64. Symbian S60 Mobile Phone Extras
65. "Stigmata Diaboli" (Live, Turku, Caribia '02, in program chain 64)
66. "For You" (Live, Turku, Caribia '02, in program chain 65)
67. Greatest Love Songs Vol. 666 pics
68. Razorblade Romance pics
69. Deep Shadows And Brilliant Highlights pics
70. Love Metal pics
71. And Love Said No pics

HIM vs. BAM (82 mins.) (comes with special editions of Vol.1)

1. "Buried Alive by Love" (Bam Margera's making of)
2. "Buried Alive by Love" (Promo)
3. "The Sacrament" (Bam Margera's making of)
4. "The Sacrament" (Promo)
5. "And Love Said No" (Bam Margera's making of)
6. "And Love Said No" (Promo)

Bonus material:

1. "Solitary Man" (Promo)
2. HIM EPK (Interview)
3. HIM TV Spot - Love Metal
4. Making of "Buried Alive by Love" (Trailer)
5. "The Sacrament" (Trailer)
6. "Solitary Man" (Trailer)

== Certifications ==
Region	Certification	Certified units/sales
Finland (Musiikkituottajat)	Platinum	13,197
United Kingdom (BPI)	Gold	25,000^{*}
^{*} Sales figures based on certification alone.
