= Digital Versatile Doom =

Live album by HIM
- Released: 29 April 2008
- Recorded: 14 and 15 November 2007
- Venue: Orpheum Theater in Los Angeles
- Label: Sire, Warner Bros.
- Producer: Tim Palmer

HIM chronology
Venus Doom (2007)	Digital Versatile Doom (2008)	Screamworks: Love in Theory and Practice (2010)

Professional ratings
Review scores
Source	Rating
AllMusic	4/5 stars

Digital Versatile Doom: Live at the Orpheum Theatre XXXVII A.S. is a live double album by Finnish rock band HIM. The DVD was directed by Meiert Avis in Los Angeles at the Orpheum Theater between 14 and 15 November 2007. The DVD features the live performance, as well as behind the scenes look at the show. Also featured on the DVD is the winner of HIM's biggest fans competition go to Seattle, Washington, to meet the band. A special edition was available for pre-order on 1 February 2008, which comes with a limited edition 6" X 4" hand-numbered flipbook limited to 3500 copies in North America and 500 in the UK. The imagery is from HIM's live performance of "Sleepwalking Past Hope" at that concert.

An unspecified delay occurred during the release of the product to the market, with the release date being changed from 31 March to 29 April, and further to 17 May for Australian listeners.

== Track listing ==
All tracks by Ville Valo except where noted.

1. "Passion's Killing Floor" – 5:14
2. "(Rip Out) the Wings of a Butterfly" – 3:31
3. "Buried Alive by Love" – 4:52
4. "Wicked Game" – 4:28 *
5. "The Kiss of Dawn" – 4:35
6. "Vampire Heart" – 4:25
7. "Poison Girl" – 5:05
8. "Dead Lovers' Lane" – 4:17
9. "Join Me in Death" – 3:30
10. "It's All Tears" – 4:21 **
11. "Sleepwalking Past Hope" – 10:41
12. "Killing Loneliness" – 4:30
13. "Soul on Fire" – 4:23
14. "Your Sweet Six Six Six" – 4:03
15. "Bleed Well" – 4:22
16. "Right Here in My Arms" – 5:26 ^{1}
17. "The Funeral of Hearts" – 4:43
18. "V.D.O. (Venus Doom Outro)" – 4:06 ^{1}

Notes _{1 iTunes version only}
* _{Written by Chris Isaac}
** _{Features sample of Monster Magnet's song "Wall of Fire"}

== DVD ==
1. "Intro (Blood Theme)"
2. "Passion's Killing Floor"
3. "Wings of a Butterfly"
4. "Buried Alive By Love"
5. "Wicked Game"
6. "The Kiss of Dawn"
7. "Vampire Heart"
8. "Poison Girl"
9. "Dead Lovers' Lane"
10. "Join Me in Death"
11. "It's All Tears (Drown in This Love)"
12. "Sleepwalking Past Hope"
13. "Killing Loneliness"
14. "Soul On Fire"
15. "Your Sweet 666"
16. "Bleed Well"
17. "Right Here in My Arms"
18. "The Funeral of Hearts"
19. "V.D.O. (Venus Doom Outro)"

=== Bonus features ===
1. "Ville Valo Interview" – 44:43
2. "Fan Videos"
3. "Fan Club Photo Gallery"

== Personnel ==
- Ville Hermanni Valo – lead vocals
- Mikko Viljami "Linde" Lindström – lead guitar
- Mikko Henrik Julius "Migé" Paananen – bass
- Janne Johannes "Emerson Burton" Puurtinen – keyboards
- Mika Kristian "Gas Lipstick" Karppinen – drums

== In media ==
- The intro, "Blood Theme", is used in the soundtrack and the closing credits for the television show Dexter.

== Charts ==
Chart (2008)	Peak position
Australian Albums (ARIA)	48
Austrian Albums (Ö3 Austria)	35
Finnish Albums (Suomen virallinen lista)	10
German Albums (Offizielle Top 100)	37
Swedish Albums (Sverigetopplistan)	59
