= Lashes to Ashes, Lust to Dust: A Vinyl Retrospective '96–'03 =

Box set by HIM
- Released: 23 December 2014
- Recorded: 1996–2003
- Genre: Gothic rock
- Label: The End Records
- Producer: Various

HIM chronology
Tears on Tape (2013)	Lashes to Ashes, Lust to Dust: A Vinyl Retrospective '96–'03 (2014)

Lashes to Ashes, Lust to Dust: A Vinyl Retrospective '96–'03 is a vinyl box set as well as the second box set by Finnish rock band HIM. The box set contains the band's first four albums on 180-gram virgin vinyl in gatefold packaging and a USB drive with 37 bonus tracks (four of which is the EP 666 Ways to Love and one not listed on the backcover of the albums), 80 tracks all together, all remastered. It was the last box set to be released by the band before their disbandment in 2017. The set also contains their first commercially released EP, 666 Ways to Love: Prologue.

== Track listing ==
666 Ways to Love: Prologue

1. "Stigmata Diaboli" – 2:55
2. "Wicked Game" (Chris Isaak) – 3:56
3. "Dark Sekret Love" – 5:19
4. "The Heartless" – 7:25

Greatest Love Songs Vol. 666

1. "For You (Intro)" - 4:00
2. "Your Sweet Six Six Six" - 4:12
3. "Wicked Game" (Chris Isaak) - 3:54
4. "The Heartless" - 4:03
5. "Our Diabolical Rapture" - 5:21
6. "It's All Tears (Drown in This Love)" - 3:44
7. "When Love and Death Embrace" - 6:08
8. "The Beginning of the End" - 4:07
9. "(Don't Fear) The Reaper" - 6:30

Razorblade Romance

1. "I Love You (Prelude to Tragedy)" - 3:09
2. "Poison Girl" - 3:51
3. "Join Me in Death" - 3:36
4. "Right Here in My Arms" - 4:03
5. "Gone with the Sin" - 4:22
6. "Razorblade Kiss" - 4:18
7. "Bury Me Deep Inside Your Heart" - 4:16
8. "Heaven Tonight" - 3:18
9. "Death Is in Love with Us" - 2:58
10. "Resurrection" - 3:39
11. "One Last Time" - 5:10

Deep Shadows and Brilliant Highlights

1. "Salt in Our Wounds" - 3:58
2. "Heartache Every Moment" - 3:56
3. "Lose You Tonight" - 3:42
4. "In Joy and Sorrow" - 4:00
5. "Pretending" - 3:55
6. "Close to the Flame" - 3:46
7. "Please Don't Let It Go" - 4:29
8. "Beautiful" - 4:33
9. "Don't Close Your Heart" - 4:39
10. "Love You Like I Do" - 5:14

Love Metal

1. "Buried Alive by Love" - 5:04
2. "The Funeral of Hearts" - 4:30
3. "Beyond Redemption" - 4:28
4. "Sweet Pandemonium" - 5:46
5. "Soul on Fire" - 4:02
6. "The Sacrament" - 4:32
7. "This Fortress of Tears" - 5:47
8. "Circle of Fear" - 5:27
9. "Endless Dark" - 5:36
10. "The Path" - 7:45
11. "Love's Requiem" - 8:38

Bonus Tracks

1. Your Sweet Six Six Six (Live at Helldone TRE MMXIII)
2. It's All Tears (ACSTC Live G&T Version)
3. Our Diabolical Rapture (Live at Rockpalast MM)
4. The Heartless (ACSTC Pascha MMXIV)
5. Stigmata Diaboli (Live at Caribia TKU MMII)
6. For You (ACSTC Live G&T Version)
7. The Beginning of the End (Live at Provinssirock MCMXCIX)
8. When Love and Death Embrace (Live at Center Stage GA MMXIV)
9. I Love You (TRNSFRMTN Version)
10. Resurrection (PRCX Version)
11. Right Here in My Arms (Live at El Teatro Flores BS.AS.MMXIV)
12. Poison Girl (Strongroom Sessions)
13. Bury Me Deep Inside Your Heart (Strongroom Sessions)
14. Death Is in Love with Us (Live at Helldone SJK MMXIII)
15. Join Me in Death (PRCX Version)
16. Gone with the Sin (Strongroom Sessions)
17. Again (Hollola Tapes)
18. Pretending (TRNSFRMTN Version)
19. Lose You Tonight (Hollola Tapes)
20. Salt in Our Wounds (John Fryer Mix)
21. Close to the Flame (Hollola Tapes)
22. Please Don't Let It Go (Hollola Tapes)
23. Pretending (Kevin Shirley Mix)
24. Love You Like I Do (Hollola Tapes)
25. Buried Alive by Love (Live at El Teatro Flores BS.AS. MMXIV)
26. Beyond Redemption (Vinnfox Relics)
27. Circle of Fear (Vinnfox Relics)
28. Soul on Fire (Live at Semifinal HKI MMIII)
29. Endless Dark (Vinnfox Relics)
30. The Sacrament (ACSTC Pascha MMXIV)
31. This Fortress of Tears (Vinnfox Relics)
32. The Funeral of Hearts (Live at Helldone MMXIII SJK)
33. Love's Requiem (VRPN)
