= The Video Collection =

The Video Collection can refer to:

- The Video Collection (Anastacia video), 2002
- The Video Collection (Anna Vissi video), 2001
- The Video Collection (Cher video), 1993
- The Video Collection (Sara Evans video), 2006
- The Video Collection (Katy Garbi video), 2003
- The Video Collection 93:99, a 1999 release by Madonna
- The Video Collection: 1997–2003, a 2003 release by HIM
- Video Collection (1984–1992), a 1996 release by Skinny Puppy
- Bowie – The Video Collection, a 1993 release by David Bowie
- Video Collection, a 2003 release by Good Charlotte
- The Video Collection, a brand of video home entertainment by Video Collection International, later renamed to 2 Entertain (currently doing business as BBC Studios Home Entertainment)
