= And Love Said No: The Greatest Hits 1997–2004 =

Greatest hits album by HIM
- Released: 15 March 2004
- Genre: Gothic metal; gothic rock; hard rock; heavy metal
- Length: 67:11
- Label: BMG; RCA; GUN; Supersonic; Terrier
- Producer: Hiili Hiilesmaa; John Fryer; T.T. Oksala; Kevin Shirley; Tim Palmer

HIM chronology
Love Metal (2003)	And Love Said No: The Greatest Hits 1997–2004 (2004)	Dark Light (2005)

Professional ratings
Review scores
Source	Rating
AllMusic	4/5 stars

And Love Said No: The Greatest Hits 1997–2004 is a greatest hits album by Finnish rock band HIM. It contains two new songs: "And Love Said No" and "Solitary Man", the latter of which is a Neil Diamond cover, both songs produced by Tim Palmer. The British version also has a re-recorded version of "It's All Tears (Drown in This Love)". The digipak version of this album comes with a DVD with six songs live at Semifinal Club in Helsinki.

== Track listing ==
1. "And Love Said No" – 4:10
2. "Join Me" – 3:37
3. "Buried Alive by Love" – 5:01
4. "Heartache Every Moment" – 3:56
5. "Solitary Man" (Neil Diamond cover) – 3:36
6. "Right Here in My Arms" – 4:00
7. "The Funeral of Hearts" – 4:29
8. "In Joy and Sorrow" – 3:59
9. "Your Sweet 666" (re-recorded version) – 3:56
10. "Gone with the Sin" – 4:22
11. "Wicked Game" (Chris Isaak cover; re-recorded version) – 4:04
12. "The Sacrament" – 4:30
13. "Close to the Flame" – 3:47
14. "It's All Tears (Drown in This Love)" (re-recorded version) – 4:30*
15. "Poison Girl" – 3:51
16. "Pretending" – 3:41
17. "When Love and Death Embrace" – 6:11
- Website extras included as Enhanced CD content

* – Only available on the UK version. Other versions omit this track completely. The UK version also features a hype sticker stating there are two never-before-released re-recordings exclusive to the UK; this is incorrect as "When Love and Death Embrace" is a remaster and not a re-recording.

=== Bonus DVD: Live at the Semifinal in Helsinki (24–30 April 2003) ===
1. "Soul on Fire" – 4:09
2. "The Funeral of Hearts" – 4:44
3. "Beyond Redemption" – 4:23
4. "Sweet Pandemonium" – 5:07
5. "Buried Alive by Love" – 4:48
6. "The Sacrament" – 4:34

== Box-set LP ==
The And Love Said No box set LP contained the band's first four studio albums on vinyl along with the "Wicked Game" EP. It does not feature the title track "And Love Said No" nor "Solitary Man".

== Charts ==
Chart performance for And Love Said No: The Greatest Hits 1997–2004
Chart (2004)	Peak position
Austrian Albums (Ö3 Austria)	9
Belgian Albums (Ultratop Flanders)	98
Dutch Albums (Album Top 100)	71
Finnish Albums (Suomen virallinen lista)	2
German Albums (Offizielle Top 100)	5
Italian Albums (FIMI)	55
Norwegian Albums (VG-lista)	32
Portuguese Albums (AFP)	11
Scottish Albums (OCC)	32
Swedish Albums (Sverigetopplistan)	20
Swiss Albums (Schweizer Hitparade)	18
UK Albums (OCC)	30

== Certifications ==
Certifications for And Love Said No: The Greatest Hits 1997–2004
Region	Certification	Certified units/sales
Finland (Musiikkituottajat)	Platinum	53,606
Germany (BVMI)	Gold	100,000^{‡}
Russia (NFPF)	Gold	10,000^{*}
United Kingdom (BPI)	Gold	100,000^{*}
^{*} Sales figures based on certification alone.^{‡} Sales+streaming figures based on certification alone.
