= Sanna-June Hyde =

English-Finnish actress

- Born: 1976 (age 49–50); Colchester, England
- Years active: 2001–present

Sanna-June Hyde (born 1976) is an English-Finnish actress.

== Early life ==
Hyde was born in Colchester in 1976, the daughter of a Finnish mother and English father.

== Career ==
Hyde studied in London at Drama Studio London and East 15 Acting School. She continued her singing work by taking singing lessons in jazz and 1940s popular cabaret standards. Early in her career, she was noted as the mysterious female vocalist on the rock band HIM's song "Dark Sekret Love" from their EP 666 Ways to Love: Prologue and their cover of "(Don't Fear) The Reaper" from their debut album Greatest Love Songs Vol. 666.

Hyde's early theatre work started in 2001, when she moved to her mother's native Finland after receiving an offer from the Joensuu City Theatre. She later worked in the city theatres of Joensuu, Helsinki, and Espoo. Since 2005, she has been performing regularly at Helsinki City Theatre. Her work there includes the role of Marcelle Paillardin, object of Master Builder Pinglet's desires, in Hotelli Paradiso by Georges Feydeau. She was also in Metsäperkele, written and directed by Kari Heiskanen, based on the Finnish 19th century industrialist G.A. Serlachius.

The drama film Pihalla (known as Playground in Germany), in which Hyde plays Riina, was released in 2009. She was picked out, along with Mikko Leppilampi, by critic Helsingin Sanomat for special praise; however, the film itself received mainly poor reviews. The political and media satire Koljatti opened on 30 September 2010 at Helsinki City Theatre, in which she played Riikka Tanner, assistant to the prime minister. Political satire in theatre was new to Finland at the time, and the production was somewhat groundbreaking in the deferential Finnish political climate. The play was immediately heavily criticised by the leading Finnish newspaper Helsingin Sanomat.

In 2010, Hyde was also in the popular Arsenikkia ja vanhoja pitsejä (Arsenic and Old Lace) as the sole female in the cast, as the two female roles were played by men. Her third production currently running was the comedy for children "Risto Räppääjä". Both plays can be categorised as family entertainments. In 2012, she performed in Yksi mies, kaksi pomoa, the Finnish version of One Man, Two Guvnors.

== Personal life ==
Hyde has lived and worked in both England and Finland, but is now based full-time in Helsinki.

== Films ==
- Dual - (2022)
- Pihalla - (2009)
- Joensuun Elli (2004)
- Octobriana & the Finger of Lenin (2003)
- The Green Fix (1998)
- Kissan Kuolema (1995)

== Theatre ==
- Hotel Paradiso - farce
- Metsäperkele - drama
- Yksi mies, kaksi pomoa (One Man, Two Guvnors)
- Koljatti (2010) - Satirical theatre
- Arsenikkia ja vanhoja pitsejä (Arsenic and Old Lace)
- Salaa rakas (2009) - comedy
- Risto Räppääjä ja villi kone (2009) - children's play
- Paratiisisaari (2007) - drama
- Kohtauksia eräästä avioerosta (2006) - drama
- Pekka Töpöhäntä (2007) - children's play
- Hitchcock Blonde (2005) drama
- Vaarallisia suhteita (Dangerous Liaisons) 2005
- Romeo ja Julia (Juliette) 2003
- Amadeus (Contanze) 2002
- Hypermarket 2001 (musical)
- Viulunsoittaja katolla (Fiddler on the Roof) (musical) - Tzeitel

== Radio dramas ==
- Kuumat munkit Yle (2006)
- Merimatikka (2003)

== TV series ==
- Syke.... Rachel McCarthy (4 episodes, 2020)
- Tatort.... Tuulia (1 episode, 2009)

- "Tango für Borowski" (2009) TV episode

- Ketonen & Myllyrinne (1 episode, 2006)
- Lilli ja Kukkaisystävät (Fifi & the Flowertots) (voice)
- Salatut Elämät.... Teresa Ala-Uotila (69 episodes, 2004–2006)
- Alright? Alright! (2005)
