= Orpheum Theatre (Los Angeles) =

Theatre in Los Angeles, California, US

Coordinates: 34.04268°N 118.255341°W

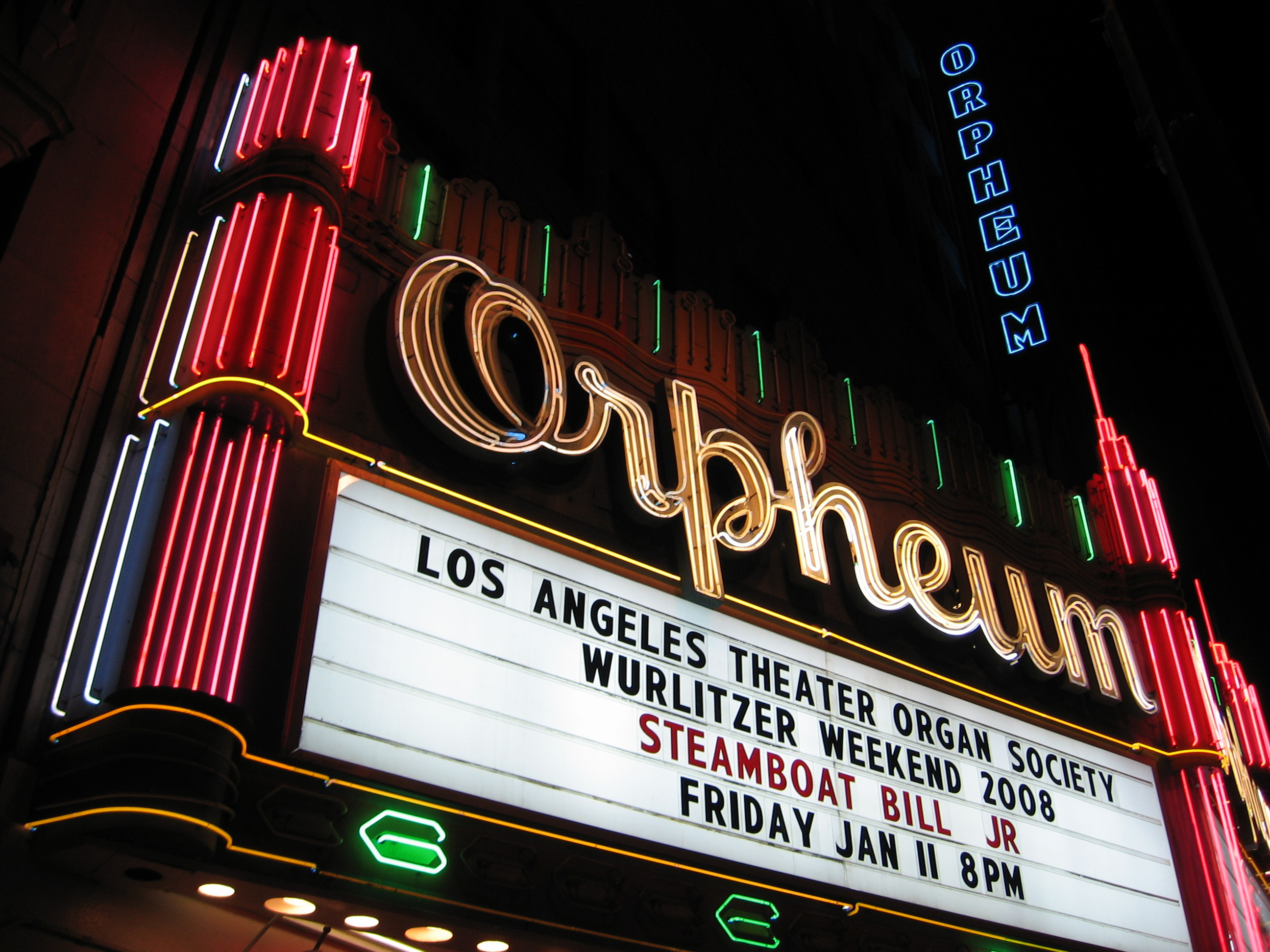
- The Orpheum Theatre marquee

- Location within the Los Angeles metropolitan area Location within California Location within the United States
- Address: 842 S. Broadway; Los Angeles, California; United States
- Owner: Anjac Fashion Buildings
- Capacity: 2,000
- Current use: Concerts, movie premieres, location shoots
- Public transit: 7th Street/Metro Center station

Construction
- Opened: February 15, 1926
- Rebuilt: 1989
- Architect: G. Albert Lansburgh

Website
- laorpheum.com

U.S. National Register of Historic Places
- Designated: May 9, 1979
- Part of: Broadway Theater and Commercial District
- Reference no.: 78000687

The Orpheum Theatre at 842 S. Broadway in Downtown Los Angeles opened on February 15, 1926, as the fourth and final Los Angeles venue for the Orpheum vaudeville circuit. After a $3 million renovation, started in 1989, it is the most restored of the historical movie palaces in the city. Three previous theatres also bore the name Orpheum before the one at 842 Broadway was the final one with that moniker.

The Orpheum has a Beaux Arts facade designed by movie theater architect G. Albert Lansburgh and has a Mighty Wurlitzer organ, installed in 1928, that is one of three pipe organs remaining in Southern California.

The Orpheum theatres are named for the Greek mythological figure, Orpheus.

== History ==
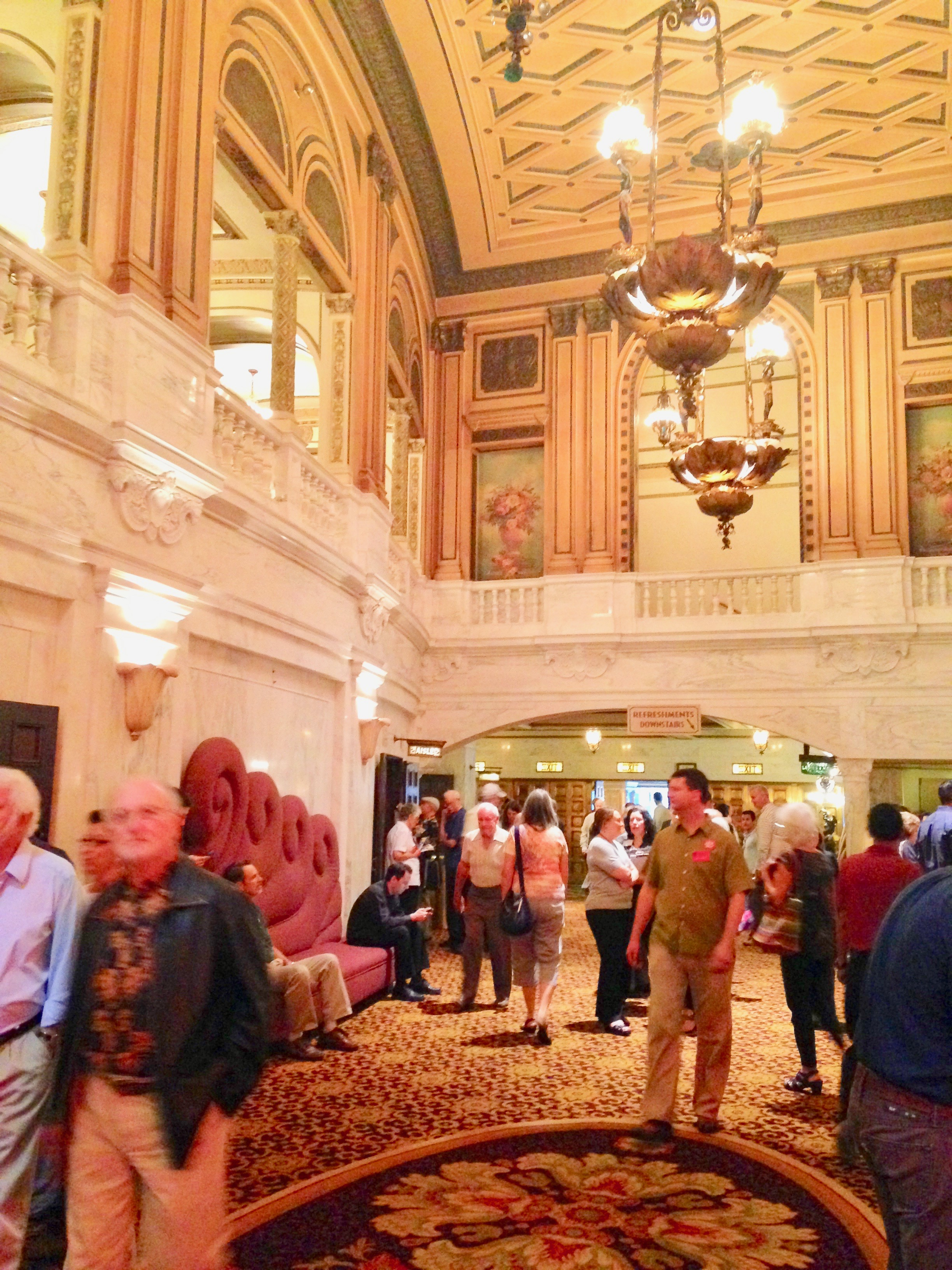
Orpheum Theatre lobby

The first site for the Orpheum vaudeville circuit in Los Angeles was the Grand Opera House. The second venue was the Orpheum Theatre (previously known as the Los Angeles Theatre and later known as the Lyceum Theatre) at 227 S. Spring Street. The third venue was the Orpheum Theatre at 630 S. Broadway, now known as the Palace Theatre.

Soon after this venue opened, it became popular for burlesque queen Sally Rand, the Marx Brothers, Will Rogers, Judy Garland (singing with her family as Frances "Baby" Gumm) and comedian Jack Benny, as well as jazz greats Lena Horne, Ella Fitzgerald and Duke Ellington. Vaudeville acts were still playing the Orpheum as late as 1950.

In the 1960s, the theater held rock 'n' roll concerts featuring Little Richard, Aretha Franklin and Little Stevie Wonder. The restored Orpheum Theatre is now a venue for live concerts, movie premieres, and location shoots. The love metal band HIM played there for their live CD/DVD album Digital Versatile Doom. The 2010 Streamy Awards were live broadcast from the theater.

== Location shoots ==
=== Television ===
- Julie and the Phantoms
- American Idol (Hollywood Week seasons 4, 5, 6, 14, 17, 18, 20, 23)
- America's Got Talent
- The Apprentice (season 5 finale)
- RuPaul's Drag Race (season 7, 8 and 11 finales)
- Hollywood (miniseries)
- Pretty Little Liars (season 4 finale and season 5 episode 1)
- Angel (1999 TV series) (season 3 episode 13)
- Glee (season 5 episode 11)
- A West Wing Special to Benefit When We All Vote (The West Wing (TV Series 1999-2006) (2020 Special Cast Reunion))
- IHOP commercial (2024)
- The Morning Show (season 4 episode 9)

=== Film ===
- Last Action Hero (1993)
- Why Do Fools Fall in Love (1998)
- Austin Powers in Goldmember (2002)
- Charlie's Angels: Full Throttle (2003)
- A Mighty Wind (2003)
- Spider-Man 3 (2007)
- Transformers (2007)
- In Search of a Midnight Kiss (2007)
- Alvin and the Chipmunks (2007)
- Hop (2011)
- The Shape of Water (2017)

=== Music Videos ===
- Akon – "Lonely"
- Avril Lavigne – "I'm with You"
- Backstreet Boys – "Shape of My Heart"
- HIM – "Digital Versatile Doom"
- Kelly Rowland – "Can't Nobody"
- Guns N' Roses – "November Rain"
- Brandi Carlile – "The Story"
- Michael Jackson – "Thriller"
- Taylor Swift – "Mean"
- Static-X - "I'm With Stupid"
- Monica - "For You I Will"
- The Wallflowers - "Heroes"

== Gallery ==
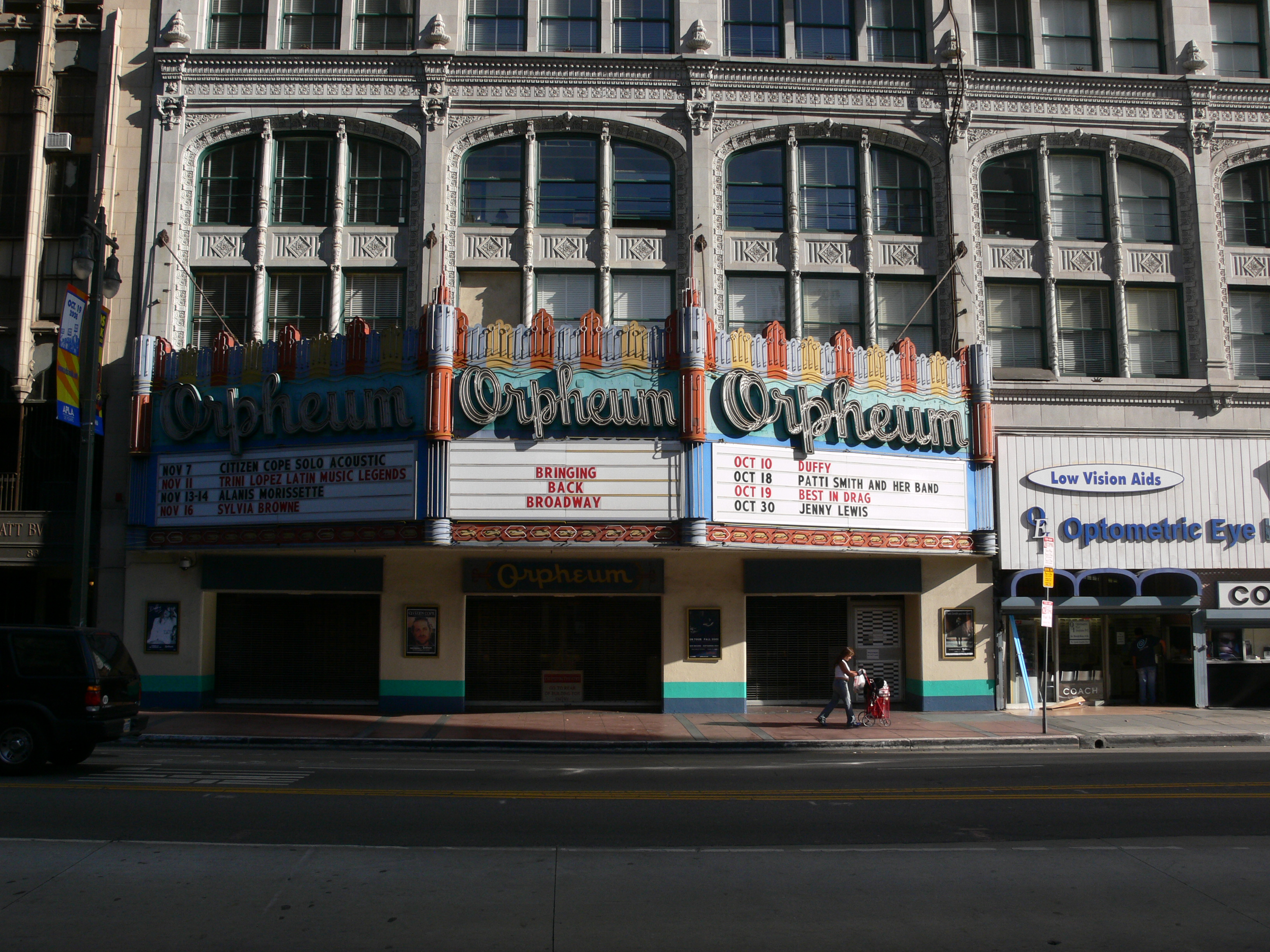
Marquee

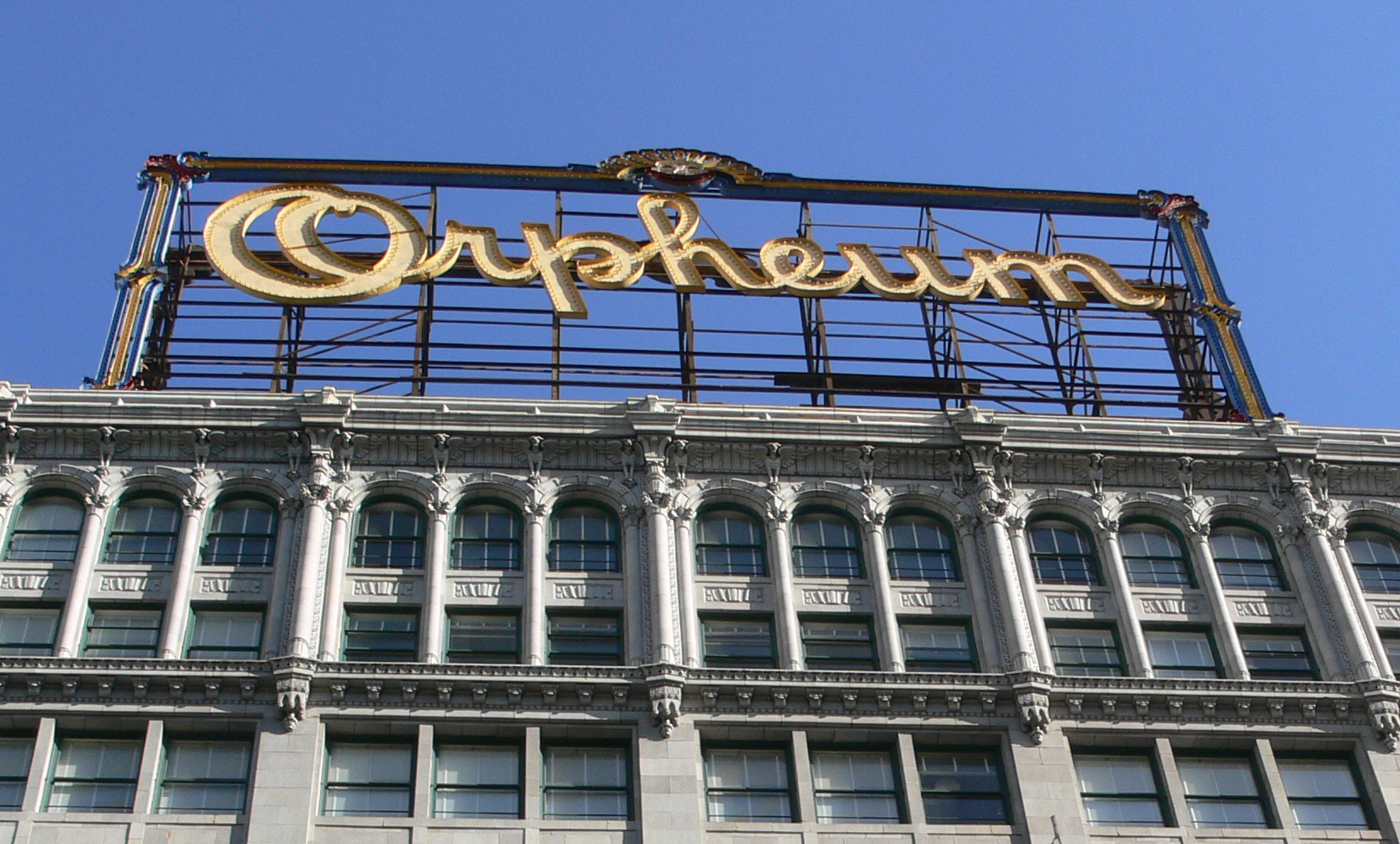
Signage

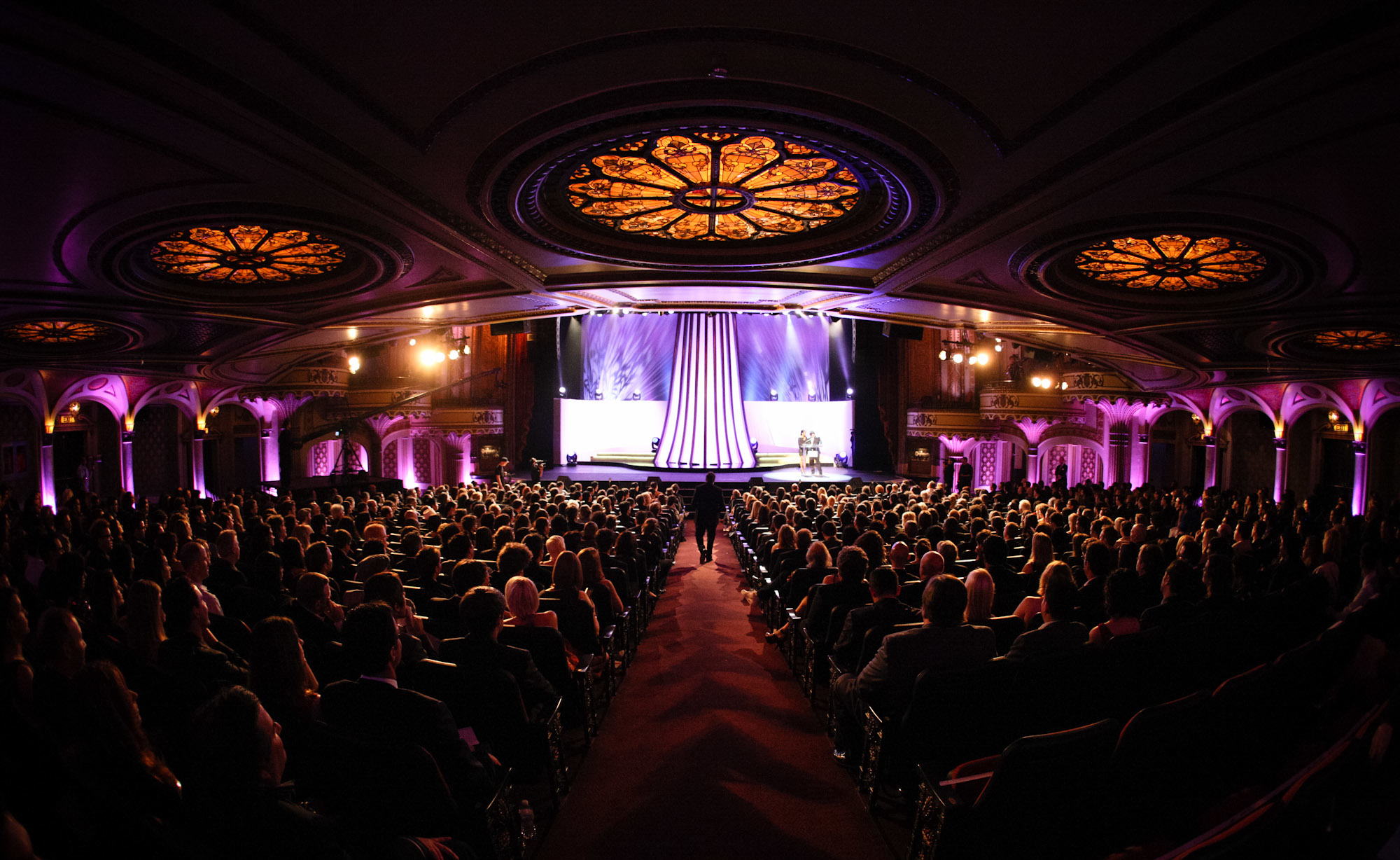
Theater interior

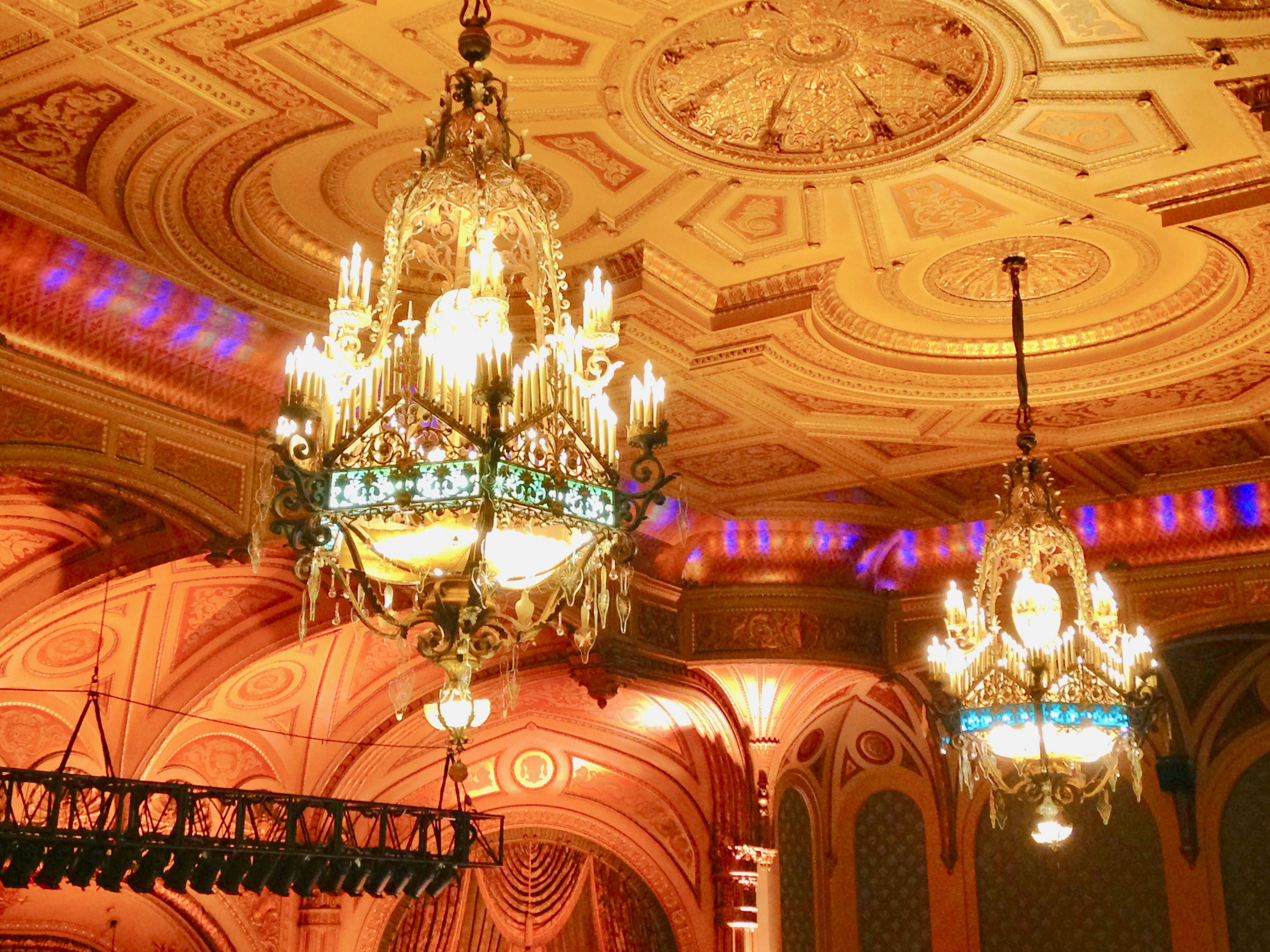
Ceiling and chandeliers

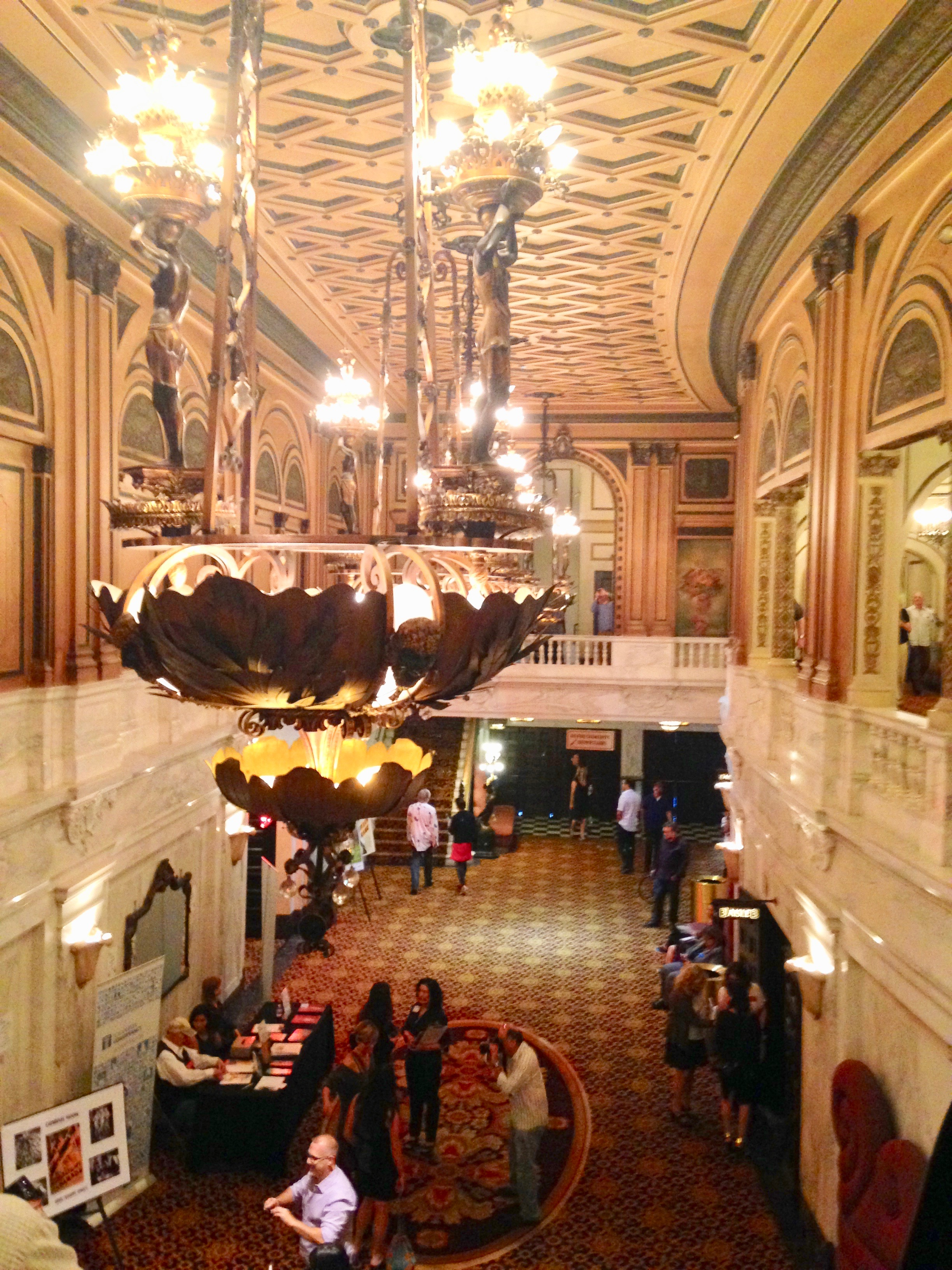
Lobby from above

== See also ==
- Broadway Theater District (Los Angeles)
- Million Dollar Theater
- Los Angeles Theatre
- Tower Theatre (Los Angeles)
- List of contributing properties in the Broadway Theater and Commercial District
