= Dark Light (HIM album) =

Studio album by HIM
- Released: 26 September 2005
- Recorded: 2005
- Studios: The Paramour Estate in Los Angeles, California
- Genres: Gothic rock; pop rock
- Length: 45:30
- Label: Sire
- Producer: Tim Palmer

HIM chronology
And Love Said No: The Greatest Hits 1997–2004 (2004)	Dark Light (2005)	Uneasy Listening Vol. 1 (2006)

Singles from Dark Light
- 1. "Wings of a Butterfly" Released: 7 September 2005; 2. "Vampire Heart" Released: November 2005; 3. "Killing Loneliness" Released: February 2006; 4. "Under the Rose" Released: 2006

Dark Light is the fifth studio album by Finnish rock band HIM. Released on 26 September 2005, HIM began recording the album in March 2005 at the Paramour Estate in Los Angeles with producer Tim Palmer, who had also mixed the band's previous album Love Metal. Dark Light also served as HIM's first worldwide release with Sire Records, with whom the band had signed with in September 2004. In Finland, however, the album was released under the band's own label Heartagram. Musically, Dark Light featured a more "polished" and "accessible" sound than previous albums, and was written as a cross between Black Sabbath and U2, also influenced by the work of composer Angelo Badalamenti.

Dark Light received mostly positive reviews from critics, with many praising the writing and the band's performance, while some criticism was given to the second half of the album. Dark Light charted in fifteen countries, reaching number one in Finland, later going platinum, as well as gold in Germany, the UK and the US, making HIM the first Finnish band to receive a gold record in the United States. Three singles were also released, with "Wings of a Butterfly" peaking at number one in Finland, and "Killing Loneliness" at number two. "Wings of a Butterfly" later received the award for "Song of the Year" at the 2005 Emma Awards, and was awarded at the 2007 BMI Pop Awards as well. During the album's world tour, HIM made their live debut in various countries, including Japan, Australia, and New Zealand.

== Production ==
In August 2003, HIM separated from BMG, after fulfilling their contractual obligations to the label. In September 2004, HIM announced that they had signed a new recording contract with Sire Records, who would handle the band's future releases in Europe, the United States, Japan and Australia. In their native Finland, however, HIM's recordings would be released through the band's own Heartagram label. In March 2005, HIM relocated to Los Angeles to start work on their fifth studio album at The Paramour Estate, with producer Tim Palmer, who had previously mixed the band's fourth album Love Metal. After two days of rehearsals, the band began recording drums, which were done in two days. This was followed by the bass, and then guitars and keyboards. The band were faced with multiple distractions during the recording process, including dogs around the estate, as well as a Playboy video shoot. Because of this, the studio equipment was moved upstairs for Ville Valo to record his vocals, while the other members of the band flew to Las Vegas with professional skateboarder and friend of the band Bam Margera.

In May 2005, HIM recruited Andy Wallace to mix the album; however, he was fired only a week later. According to Valo, Wallace lost the "melancholia" in his mixes, explaining: "It sounded fucking good, but it sounded like radio-friendly American rock [...] and we're not that." Thus, producer Tim Palmer was tasked with mixing the album at Electric Lady Studios in New York, after which the album was mastered by Stephen Marcussen at Sterling Sound. Originally planned as In the Nightside of Eden, the album's title was changed to Dark Light, because the band felt that the latter would be a more memorable title, seeing as how this would be HIM's first album to be officially released in Japan, Australia and North America. The title Dark Light was inspired by a book of the same name by Mette Newth, and was also thought up as a play on words; Ville Valo's last name translates to "light", and "dark light" in Finnish would be "pimeä valo", which in turn would mean that Ville Valo was "mad". Dark Light also continues the band's tradition of "contradictions in [album] titles". The cover art of Dark Light was designed by Matt Taylor and Sonny Gerasimowicz.

== Music and lyrics ==
"Wings of a Butterfly" (2005)
"Wings of a Butterfly" has been described as fusing "echo-chamber guitars with a sugar-bomb chorus".

According to Valo, the band entered the studio with the idea of creating a cross between Black Sabbath's Sabbath Bloody Sabbath and Achtung Baby by U2, and Dark Light has been described as more "polished" and "accessible" than HIM's previous albums. The first half of the record was written long before entering the studio, while the second half was composed a month and a half prior, after Valo threw away much of the original material, because "it was too slow". According to Valo, the band's approach on Dark Light was to make the songs sound more "cinematic, epic, and close to the listeners", inspired by the works of composer Angelo Badalamenti. Valo also mentioned This Mortal Coil as an influence on the album's "spooky, eerie" sound. Lyrically, Dark Light deals mostly with themes of "girls and boys and the politics of the heart".

"Vampire Heart" opens with a riff reminiscent of the theme to the 1978 film Halloween, while "Rip Out the Wings of a Butterfly" was described by Valo as a "link between 'She Sells Sanctuary' by The Cult and 'Billie Jean' by Michael Jackson". The lyrics were inspired by a legend of immortal souls possessing the wings of a butterfly, and talks about: "Whether you are willing enough to destroy something beautiful to gain yourself some power." According to Valo, the song was chosen as the first single from Dark Light, because it was "the perfect song to describe what's going to happen on the entire album", containing all the signature elements of the band's sound as well. "Killing Loneliness" was partly inspired by professional skateboarder Brandon Novak and his heroin addiction, and talks about the various ways people "kill their loneliness, and with what", while "Behind the Crimson Door" features Valo humming a poem by Finnish author Timo K. Mukka. Valo described "The Face of God" as "Achtung-era U2, with Queens of the Stone Age meeting the Satanic Bee Gees", and "In the Nightside of Eden" as the "prog rock" song of the album, which also makes mention of the Divine Comedy by Dante Alighieri. The band's cover of "Poison Heart" by the Ramones features claps by Sire Records' co-founder Seymour Stein and A&R executive Michael Goldstone.

== Release and promotion ==
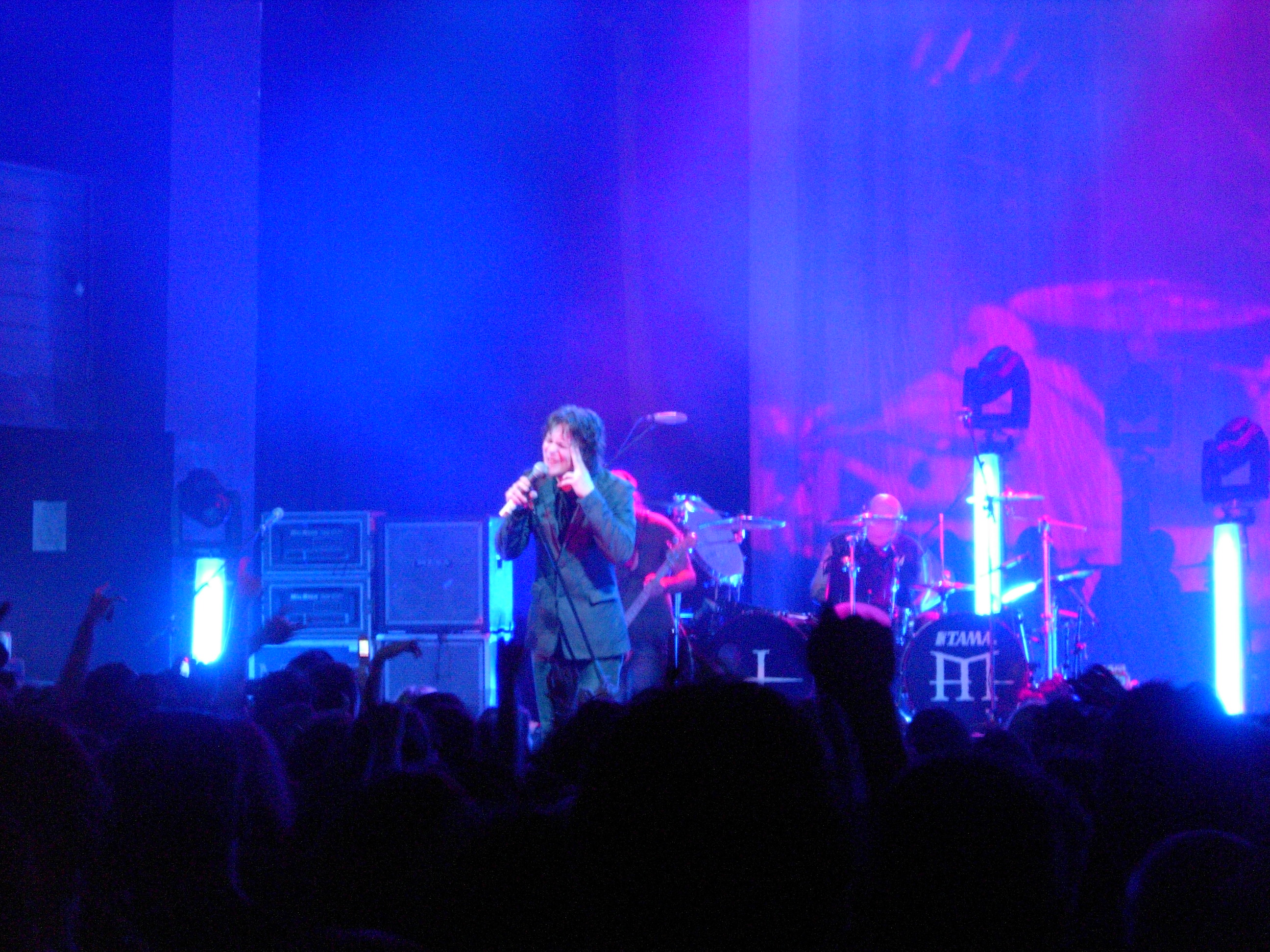
HIM performing in Milan in September 2005

"Rip Out the Wings of a Butterfly" (under the title "Wings of a Butterfly") was released as the first single from Dark Light on 7 September 2005, charting in ten countries, including at number one in Finland, number ten in Germany and the UK, and at number 19 on the US Alternative Chart. A music video was also produced for the song. That same month, HIM embarked on European club tour to prepare for the release Dark Light. The album was released on 26 September 2005, and charted in sixteen countries, including at number one in Finland and Greece, number four in Germany and Austria, and number 18 in the UK and US. The album would eventually be certified platinum in Finland, and gold in Germany, Greece, the UK, and the US, making HIM the first Finnish artist to receive a gold record in the United States. The North American leg of the album's supporting tour began in Portland, Oregon, on 5 October 2005, and continued until the end of November, with Skindred and Flinch serving as supporting acts. In November 2005, "Vampire Heart" was released as a promotional singles from Dark Light. For the 2005 edition of the band's annual New Year's Eve shows, the event was expanded into a festival and renamed Helldone.

The band were scheduled to begin a tour of the UK and Ireland in January 2006, but were forced to postpone it until February, after guitarist Mikko "Linde" Lindström fractured his wrist after Helldone. At the 2005 Emma Awards, HIM went on to win "Rock Album of the Year", and "Song of the Year" for "Wings of a Butterfly". Dark Light was also nominated for "Album of the Year". On 9 February 2006, HIM began a joint seven-date tour with The Rasmus and Negative across Central Europe, after which HIM continued through Southern Europe, Japan, Australia and New Zealand. Also in February 2006, "Killing Loneliness" was released as a single, charting in five countries, peaking at number two in Finland. Two music videos were produced for the song, the latter of which featured a guest appearance by tattoo artist Kat Von D. From May to June 2006, HIM toured the US with Aiden acting as support. In August 2006, HIM were nominated by Kerrang! for "Best Band on the Planet". In September 2006, HIM cancelled a forthcoming North American tour, in order to begin work on a new album. "Under the Rose" was also released as the final promotional single from Dark Light in 2006. In October 2007, Ville Valo was awarded at the BMI Pop Award for "Wings of a Butterfly".

== Reception ==
Professional ratings
Aggregate scores
Source	Rating
Metacritic	52/100
Review scores
Source	Rating
Rumba	5/5 stars
Rock Hard	8.5/10
Imperiumi.net	8+/10
MusicOMH	Positive
Soundi	4/5 stars
Helsingin Sanomat	Positive
AllMusic	3.5/5 stars
Drowned in Sound	5/10

Dark Light received mostly mixed to positive reviews from critics, with an average score of 52 out of 100 on Metacritic, based on 10 reviews. The New York Times described the material as "sturdier than ever", while Q called the album a "collection of irresistible pop-rock anthems". Chris Ingold of musicOMH touted Dark Light as HIM's "most accessible album to date", containing "the powerful sense of identity and cohesion that has allowed the band to shamelessly rip-off all manner of classic rock moments yet always sound like themselves." Rumba's Tapio Ahola gave the album five out of five stars, praising it as fulfilling the potential of the band, as well as featuring material "with more depth" than some of the group's other work. Conny Schiffbauer of Rock Hard, who gave the album eight-point-five out of ten, called Dark Light a "successful album", giving praise to both the vocals and instrumentation, and likening the album to The Cult, Black Sabbath and U2. Turkka Holmqvist of Imperiumi.net gave the album eight-plus out of ten, and called it "fresh" and a "positive surprise". He did, however, comment on only half the album being up to par, but concluded that the album "takes the band back to the times when they were good on their own terms". Vesa Sirén of Soundi described Valo's melodies as sounding even more like traditional Finnish schlager than before, and commended the arrangements as "precise" and "nuanced". Sirén also felt that the second half of the album did not live up to the first, but still awarded Dark Light four stars out of five.

Tero Valkonen of Helsingin Sanomat was positive in his review, singling out "Wings of a Butterfly" and "In the Nightside of Eden" as particular highlights, but did still criticize the album for following the same formula as the band's previous efforts. AllMusic awarded the album three-and-a-half stars out of five, and described it as "glossy and user-friendly". Raziq Rauf of Drowned in Sound gave the album five out of ten, and called the album "unremarkable" yet "solid". He praised Valo's performance, but criticized the material backing him as "dull" and "turgid backwash". NME also described Dark Light as "wimpy", giving the album 40 out of 100. Spin gave the album 25 out 100, and stated that Dark Light "gives new meaning to the phrase virgin sacrifice", while Stylus Magazine felt that "there's nothing to get excited or exhilarated over" on the album, also giving the album 25 out of 100.

In 2016, the readers of Metal Hammer magazine voted Dark Light the second best metal album of the 21st century, second only to Babymetal's self-titled debut. In 2017, Valo revisited Dark Light and described it as a "pretty experimental record" for the band, stating: "Finnish melancholia was brought to the middle of the sunny city of angels, and we forcefully tried wed them. A good combination of the two." Loudwire later ranked Dark Light fourth in the band's discography, giving praise to the production and songwriting, while stating that "ultimately the 'dark' part of the title falls short of expectations." Kaaoszine ranked Dark Light as the second-best HIM album, stating: "Some albums are like a gateway to a dreamworld bigger than life. Dark Light is one of those records."

== Track listing ==
All tracks written by Ville Valo, except where noted.

No.	Title	Length
1.	"Vampire Heart"	4:46
2.	"Rip Out the Wings of a Butterfly"	3:30
3.	"Under the Rose"	4:50
4.	"Killing Loneliness"	4:29
5.	"Dark Light"	4:31
6.	"Behind the Crimson Door"	4:37
7.	"The Face of God"	4:36
8.	"Drunk on Shadows"	3:49
9.	"Play Dead"	4:36
10.	"In the Nightside of Eden"	5:40
Total length:		45:44

Limited Edition bonus track
No.	Title	Length
11.	"The Cage"	4:17
Total length:		50:01

Japanese/iTunes/Spotify bonus track
No.	Title	Writer(s)	Length
11.	"Poison Heart"	Dee Dee Ramone, Daniel Rey	3:41
Total length:			48:58

Heartagram Internet Edition bonus tracks
No.	Title	Length
11.	"Venus (In Our Blood)"	4:32
12.	"The Cage"	4:17
Total length:		54:33

Gatefold vinyl bonus tracks
No.	Title	Writer(s)	Length
11.	"Venus (In Our Blood)"		4:32
12.	"The Cage"		4:17
13.	"Poison Heart"	Dee Dee Ramone, Daniel Rey	3:41
Total length:			58:14

== Personnel ==
HIM

- Ville Valo − lead vocals, art direction
- Mikko "Linde" Lindström − guitar
- Mikko "Mige" Paananen − bass
- Janne "Burton" Puurtinen − keyboards
- Mika "Gas Lipstick" Karppinen − drums

Production

- Tim Palmer − production, mixing
- Mark O'Donoughue − engineering
- Dave Starr – recording assistant
- Steef Van De Gevel − mixing assistant
- Stephen Marcussen − mastering
- Cindi Peters – production coordination
- Muichael Goldstone – A&R
- Matt Taylor − artwork, art direction
- Sonny Gerasimowicz − artwork
- Ellen Wakayama – art direction
- Ralf Strathmann – photography

== Charts ==
Chart	Peak position
Australian Albums Chart	40
Austrian Albums Chart	4
Belgium Albums Chart	42
Finnish Albums Chart	1
French Albums Chart	155
German Albums Chart	4
Greek Albums Chart	1
Hungarian Albums Chart	15
Italian Albums Chart	10
Dutch Albums Chart	25
Norwegian Albums Chart	13
Portuguese Albums Chart	27
Spanish Albums Chart	10
Swedish Albums Chart	7
Swiss Albums Chart	8
UK Albums Chart	18
US Billboard 200	18

== Certifications ==
Region	Certification	Certified units/sales
Finland (Musiikkituottajat)	Platinum	38,720
Germany (BVMI)	Gold	100,000^{^}
Greece (IFPI Greece)	Gold	10,000^{^}
United Kingdom (BPI)	Gold	100,000^{^}
United States (RIAA)	Gold	500,000^{^}
^{^} Shipments figures based on certification alone.
