= 666 Ways to Love: Prologue =

EP by Finnish band HIM, released in 1996

EP by HIM
- Released: 19 October 1996
- Length: 19:35
- Label: BMG
- Producer: Hiili Hiilesmaa

HIM chronology
This Is Only the Beginning (1995)	666 Ways to Love: Prologue (1996)	Greatest Lovesongs Vol. 666 (1997)

666 Ways to Love: Prologue is an extended play (EP) by Finnish band HIM, released in 1996 only in Finland. It was produced by Hiili Hiilesmaa, and was recorded at Finnvox, MD, and Peacemakers, Helsinki. It is their first release after a demo in 1995. Only 1,000 copies were produced. The EP peaked at number nine on the Finnish Singles Chart during the first week of 1997. The woman pictured on the front cover of the album is the mother of HIM's lead singer, Ville Valo. The EP was re-released for the first time, on vinyl, on 25 November 2014, in Lashes to Ashes, Lust to Dust: A Vinyl Retrospective '96–'03.

== Track listing ==
All songs written by Ville Valo, except where noted.

1. "Stigmata Diaboli" – 2:55
2. "Wicked Game" (Chris Isaak) – 3:56
3. "Dark Sekret Love" – 5:19
4. "The Heartless" – 7:25
- The last 1:40 of "The Heartless" was included as the hidden track on Greatest Lovesongs Vol. 666, which also included a shorter re-recording of "The Heartless" and a new recording of "Wicked Game".

== Personnel ==
- Ville Hermanni Valo − lead vocals
- Mikko Viljami "Linde" Lindström − lead guitar
- Oskari "Oki" Kymäläinen − rhythm guitar (Note: Kymäläinen was simply credited as "Oki" on this release.)
- Mikko Henrik Julius "Migé" Paananen − bass guitar
- Antto Melasniemi − keyboards
- Juhana Tuomas "Pätkä" Rantala − drums
- Sanna-June Hyde − vocals on "Dark Sekret Love"
- Kai "Hiili" Hiilesmaa − moog synthesizer on "Dark Sekret Love"

== Charts ==
Chart (1997)	Peak position
Finland (Suomen virallinen lista)	9
