= Wings of a Butterfly =

Song by the Finnish band HIM

Single by HIM

from the album Dark Light
- B-side: "Poison Heart"
- Released: 7 September 2005
- Length: 3:29
- Label: HMC; Sire
- Songwriter(s): Ville Valo
- Producer(s): HIM

HIM singles chronology
"And Love Said No" (2004)	"Wings of a Butterfly" (2005)	"Killing Loneliness" (2006)

"Wings of a Butterfly" (released as "Rip Out the Wings of a Butterfly" on the album) is a song by Finnish gothic rock band HIM. It is the second track on their fifth studio album, Dark Light (2005), and was released as the album's first single in September 2005. The song reached number one in Finland and Hungary, number 10 in Germany and the United Kingdom, and number 87 in the United States, making it the biggest single from Dark Light worldwide. The music video, filmed at Union Station in Los Angeles, was number one on the Rock Countdown on MTV2 in late 2005 for five weeks until it was retired.

== Track listings ==
Finnish and European maxi-CD single

1. "Wings of a Butterfly"
2. "And Love Said No" (616 version)
3. "Vampire Heart" (live at Donington)
4. "Wings of a Butterfly" (video)

European CD single

1. "Wings of a Butterfly"
2. "Poison Heart" (Ramones cover)

US DVD single

1. "Wings of a Butterfly" (video)
2. Making of "Wings of a Butterfly"

== Charts ==
Chart (2005–2006)	Peak position
Austria (Ö3 Austria Top 40)	12
Europe (Eurochart Hot 100)	14
Finland (Suomen virallinen lista)	1
Germany (GfK)	10
Greece (IFPI)	4
Hungary (Single Top 40)	1
Ireland (IRMA)	35
Italy (FIMI)	20
Norway (VG-lista)	18
Scotland (OCC)	9
Spain (PROMUSICAE)	3
Sweden (Sverigetopplistan)	12
Switzerland (Schweizer Hitparade)	28
UK Singles (OCC)	10
UK Rock & Metal (OCC)	1
US Billboard Hot 100	87
US Alternative Airplay (Billboard)	19
US Mainstream Rock (Billboard)	20
