= Love Metal =

Studio album by HIM
- Released: 11 April 2003
- Recorded: 2002
- Studio: Finnvox Studios in Helsinki
- Genre: Gothic rock; heavy metal
- Length: 52:53
- Label: BMG
- Producer: HIM; Hiili Hiilesmaa

HIM chronology
Deep Shadows and Brilliant Highlights (2001)	Love Metal (2003)	And Love Said No: The Greatest Hits 1997–2004 (2004)

Singles from Love Metal
- 1. "The Funeral of Hearts" Released: 13 March 2003; 2. "Buried Alive by Love" Released: 5 May 2003; 3. "The Sacrament" Released: 27 June 2003

Love Metal is the fourth studio album by Finnish rock band HIM. Released on 11 April 2003, HIM began recording demos for the album in northern spring 2002, after an exhausting touring cycle for their previous album, which nearly broke the band up. Excited and invigorated by the new material, HIM entered Finnvox Studios in September 2002 with producer Hiili Hiilesmaa, who had previously helmed the group's 1997 debut album. Musically Love Metal featured a more raw and organic sound, inspired by the band's early influences, which was also seen as a reaction to the difficulties they faced while recording their previous album. Vocalist Ville Valo has since described Love Metal as the album where HIM found their sound. Love Metal was also the band's first album to predominantly feature their logo, the Heartagram, on the cover, while the album's title was coined in the mid-nineties as a description for HIM's musical genre.

Love Metal received positive reviews from critics, with many praising the songwriting and calling the album a return to form after Deep Shadows and Brilliant Highlights. The album charted in eleven countries, reaching number one in Finland and Germany, later going platinum and gold respectively. Love Metal was also the band's first album to chart in the UK and France at number 55 and 141 respectively. Three singles were released, with "The Funeral of Hearts" reaching number one on the Finnish Singles Chart. Music videos were produced for all three singles, with professional skateboarder and Jackass member Bam Margera directing two. Following the album's release, HIM toured the US for the first time, with all of the shows being sold out.

== Production ==
After nearly breaking up following an exhausting supporting tour for their previous album Deep Shadows and Brilliant Highlights, HIM took a two-month break in early 2002. While other members of the band flew on vacation, vocalist Ville Valo stayed behind in Helsinki and began writing new material. When HIM regrouped at the turn of February and March 2002, the band felt re-energized, as well as excited about the new songs Valo had written. The group soon began recording demos in the spring of 2002, with producer Hiili Hiilesmaa, who had previously produced the band's 1997 debut album. HIM continued to work on new material for approximately six months, before entering Finnvox Studios in September 2002 to record their fourth studio album with Hiilesmaa acting as producer. The recording process lasted two months, after which the band flew to Los Angeles for two weeks to mix the album at Studio Scream with Tim Palmer, who had previously worked with Pearl Jam and U2 among others. Additional mixing for the tracks "Buried Alive by Love" and "Sweet Pandemonium" was done at Sphere Studios in London, while the album was mastered at Sterling Sound in New York by George Marino.

The artwork for Love Metal was designed by Valo and Janne Uotila, and marks the first predominant use of the band's logo the heartagram, which was originally designed by Valo on his twentieth birthday in 1996. According to Valo, the inclusion of the heartagram on the cover was done as "a statement of intent [...] musically, visually and ideologically", as well as to "get the symbol across". The term "love metal" was coined by the band in the late-nineties as way to respond to peoples' difficulty categorizing HIM's music, and was chosen as the title of the album in order to explain to people what the term means, with Valo stating: "When somebody asks 'what is love metal', we can give him or her the album".

== Music and lyrics ==
"Buried Alive by Love" (2003)
"Buried Alive by Love" was one of the first songs written for Love Metal, and displays the more aggressive approach featured on the album.

The overall sound of Love Metal was described by Ville Valo as being more "organic" and "dynamic" than some of the band's previous work, whilst at the same time containing elements from all their albums in one. He also described Love Metal as a "hats off" to the band's influences, such as Black Sabbath, Led Zeppelin, and Iggy Pop, as well as a reaction to the difficulties they faced during the making of Deep Shadows and Brilliant Highlights. He elaborated, stating: "After what we considered a disappointment with Deep Shadows and Brilliant Highlights, because there were so many chefs in the kitchen, we wanted to be a band [...] that we control what we do, and everybody else can fuck-off." Valo referred to Love Metal as a "moment of realization" for the band, stating: "This is what we are, and this is what we're going to do". He also described the album as the point where the group found "the identity of the band".

"Buried Alive by Love" was one of the first songs composed for the album, and opens with a riff inspired by "Search and Destroy" by The Stooges, which Valo had written while on tour for Razorblade Romance. According to Valo, the song was deliberately chosen as the first track of the album to display "that youthful, animalistic energy" that had been "lacking" in some of the band's previous work. "The Funeral of Hearts" wasn't originally considered for the album, as it was unfinished when recording began. The song was added at the last minute after bassist Mikko "Mige" Paananen heard the chorus, demanding it be included on the album. Lyrically "The Funeral of Hearts" talks about "being able to celebrate what you have, even though things might end." Valo described the song as "the most accessible, straight on HIM-tune" on Love Metal. "Beyond Redemption" was inspired by a relationship of a friend of Valo's, and lyrically deals with "people who fall in love, and then they are beyond redemption; there's no turning back". "Sweet Pandemonium" talks about "understanding you've got a problem" and the difficulty to "talk about it", while "Circle of Fear" deals with the inability to help other people "without loving yourself first". "The Path" was inspired by the legend of Orpheus, and was included in the end credits of the Finnish film Honey Baby, as was "The Sacrament" in the 2007 anime film Highlander: The Search for Vengeance.

== Release and promotion ==
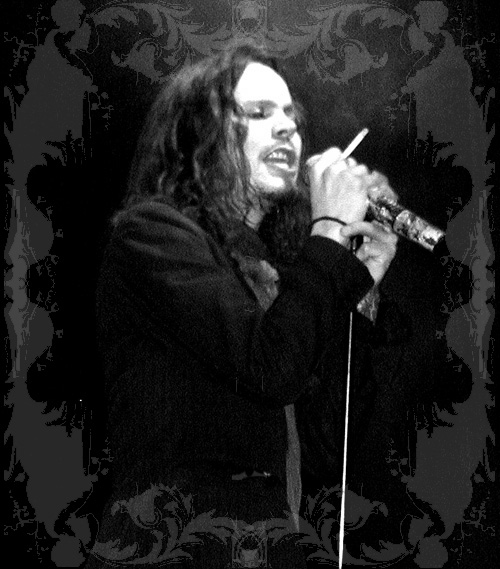
Ville Valo performing in Norfolk, Virginia, in August 2004

"The Funeral of Hearts" was released in March 2003 as the first single from Love Metal, charting in five countries, including at number one in Finland and number two in Germany. The song also gave the band their first UK chart position at number fifteen. A music video by Stefan Lindfors was also filmed in Lapland, which later won "Best Video" at the 2004 Kerrang! Awards. "The Funeral of Hearts" was also nominated for "Best Single" that year. Love Metal was released on 11 April 2003 in Finland and on 14 April internationally, and charted in eleven countries, peaking at number one in Finland and Germany, number four in Switzerland, and at number five in Austria. The album also reached number 55 on the UK Albums Chart, and later charted at number 117 in the US in 2005. Love Metal was eventually certified platinum in Finland and gold in Germany. The album was also nominated for "Best Album" at the 2003 Kerrang! Awards, as well as "Hard Rock/Metal Album of the Year" at the 2003 Emma Awards, while HIM were nominated for "Band of the Year".

"Buried Alive by Love" and "The Sacrament" were released as singles in May and June 2003 respectively, with both hitting the UK charts, and the latter also peaking at number four in Finland. Both received music videos, which were directed by professional skateboarder and Jackass member Bam Margera. The band had first met Margera in 2000, after a show in London, and played their first concert in the United States the following year at a party organized by Margera. "Buried Alive by Love" was shot in Los Angeles, with a guest appearance by actress Juliette Lewis, while "The Sacrament" was filmed in Prague. In May 2003, HIM performed a sold-out show at the London Astoria, before starting the album's supporting tour in October 2003 in Finland. HIM were also scheduled to support Ozzy Osbourne in the fall of 2003 on a European tour, but were forced to drop-out, after the tour was postponed due to Osbourne injuring his leg. Following the release of the compilation album And Love Said No: The Greatest Hits 1997–2004, HIM announced in August 2003, that they had parted ways with their record company BMG, having fulfilled their contractual obligations to the label. Around the same time the band also announced plans to release a new live album, tentatively titled Live Metal, in November 2003, but the record was ultimately scrapped, in favor of starting work on new material. HIM continued touring on 17 January 2004 in Italy, which was followed by a seven-date UK leg, which was entirely sold-out. From 15 April to 19 May 2004, HIM embarked on their first tour of the US, which was also entirely sold-out. HIM also received a nomination for "Best Band on the Planet" at the 2004 Kerrang! Awards.

== Reception ==
Professional ratings
Review scores
Source	Rating
Imperiumi.net	9-/10
Rock Hard	8.5/10
PopMatters	8/10 stars
Helsingin Sanomat	Positive
Rumba	4/5 stars
AllMusic	3.5/5 stars
Soundi	3/5 stars

Love Metal received positive reviews from critics. Mape Ollila of Imperiumi.net commended the consistent quality of the material, as well as the "hook-laden" songwriting. He concluded his review, stating: "There are a lot of goth pop bands in Finland doing the same thing, but Love Metal once again proves that HIM is one step ahead of everybody else." Thomas Kupfer of Rock Hard also commended the album's consistent songwriting. He also touted Love Metal as a return to form after Deep Shadows and Brilliant Highlights, calling it a "liberation" after the band's previous hardships. Lance Teegarden of PopMatters praised its "swooning pop hooks, a heavy yet harmonic sound, laments about love, death, and forgiveness, and an assured sense of songcraft". He did however criticize the songwriting as formulaic, but concluded his review by stating: "no one is doing the whole gothic rock thing as convincingly as HIM are right now."

Ilkka Mattila of Helsingin Sanomat was positive in his review of Love Metal, describing the band as sounding "liberated" and more rock following Deep Shadows and Brilliant Highlights. Rumba's Samuli Knuuti described Love Metal as a return to the roots of the band and sounding like "what HIM should sound like", despite perceiving a lack of variety. Rob Theakston of AllMusic praised the album's songwriting as being "as strong as it has been in quite some time", with "a newly found sense of urgency [keeping] the record going at a well-tempered pace". He also touted Love Metal as the album "HIM has been struggling to make and realize for quite a while", providing "dramatic metal of high sonic quality". Petri Silas of Soundi commended the band's ability to innovate themselves with the "faster songs" amid the "grand, mid-tempo tracks." He did however criticize the album of being more of the same "pain-ridden, gothic dragging".

In 2017, Valo revisited Love Metal and declared it as the band's best album, stating: "We found the sound of the band, and I found myself. The band's declaration of what we are." Loudwire later ranked Love Metal as HIM's second best album, describing it as an improvement over Deep Shadows and Brilliant Highlights and as the album where the band "truly found their sound that moved them forward throughout the next decade." On the other hand, Kaaoszine ranked Love Metal seventh in HIM's discography, calling it "a good collection of songs", but overall "tiring".

== Track listing ==
=== Original release ===
All tracks written by Ville Valo.

No.	Title	Length
1.	"Buried Alive by Love"	5:01
2.	"The Funeral of Hearts"	4:30
3.	"Beyond Redemption"	4:28
4.	"Sweet Pandemonium"	5:45
5.	"Soul on Fire"	4:02
6.	"The Sacrament"	4:32
7.	"This Fortress of Tears"	5:46
8.	"Circle of Fear"	5:27
9.	"Endless Dark"	5:35
10.	"The Path"	7:44
Total length:		52:53

Digipak bonus track
No.	Title	Length
11.	"Love's Requiem"	8:36
Total length:		60:50

Remastered edition (2014)
No.	Title	Length
11.	"Love's Requiem" (Backwards version)	8:36
Total length:		60:50

=== Remastered edition ===
No.	Title	Length
1.	"Buried Alive by Love" (live at El Teatro Flores BS.AS. MMXIV)	5:21
2.	"Beyond Redemption" (Vinnfox Relics)	4:31
3.	"Circle of Fear" (Vinnfox Relics)	4:25
4.	"Soul on Fire" (live at Semifinal HKI MMIII)	4:14
5.	"Endless Dark" (Vinnfox Relics)	4:12
6.	"The Sacrament" (ACSTC Pascha MMXIV)	3:59
7.	"This Fortress of Tears" (Vinnfox Relics)	5:33
8.	"The Funeral of Hearts" (live at Helldone MMXIII SJK)	6:18
Total length:		38:33

== Personnel ==
HIM

- Ville Valo − lead and backing vocals, artwork
- Mikko "Linde" Lindström − guitars
- Mikko "Mige" Paananen − bass
- Janne "Burton" Puurtinen − keyboards
- Mika "Gas Lipstick" Karppinen − drums

Production

- Hiili Hiilesmaa − production, engineering
- Tim Palmer − mixing
- Mark O'Donoughue − mixing engineer
- Alex Uychocde - mixing assistant
- Nick Friend − mixing assistant
- George Marino − mastering
- Janne Uotila − artwork

== Charts ==
=== Weekly charts ===
Chart (2003–05)	Peak position
Austrian Albums (Ö3 Austria)	5
Finnish Albums (Suomen virallinen lista)	1
French Albums (SNEP)	141
German Albums (Offizielle Top 100)	1
Hungarian Albums (MAHASZ)	24
Italian Albums (FIMI)	22
Norwegian Albums (VG-lista)	32
Portuguese Albums (AFP)	21
Scottish Albums (OCC)	56
Swedish Albums (Sverigetopplistan)	11
Swiss Albums (Schweizer Hitparade)	4
UK Albums (OCC)	55
US Billboard 200	117
US Heatseekers Albums (Billboard)	1
US Vinyl Albums (Billboard)	9

=== Year-end charts ===
Year-end chart performance for Love Metal
Chart (2003)	Position
Finnish Artist Albums (Suomen virallinen lista)	15
German Albums (Offizielle Top 100)	40
Hungarian Albums (MAHASZ)	98
Swiss Albums (Schweizer Hitparade)	94

== Certifications ==
Region	Certification	Certified units/sales
Finland (Musiikkituottajat)	Platinum	49,231
Germany (BVMI)	Gold	100,000^{^}
Russia (NFPF)	Platinum	20,000^{*}
United Kingdom (BPI)	Gold	100,000^{*}
^{*} Sales figures based on certification alone.^{^} Shipments figures based on certification alone.
