= Killing Loneliness =

Single by HIM

from the album Dark Light
- Released: 24 February 2006
- Recorded: 2005
- Length: 4:29; 4:01 (Video version)
- Label: Sire Records
- Songwriter(s): Ville Valo
- Producer(s): HIM

HIM singles chronology
| "Wings of a Butterfly" (2005) | "Killing Loneliness" (2006) | "The Kiss of Dawn" (2007) |

"Killing Loneliness" is a song by Finnish rock band HIM. It was released in February 2006, as a single from their 2005 breakthrough album, Dark Light. "Killing Loneliness", along with "Wings of a Butterfly", is one of the band's best known songs in the United States.

On the 11 May 2006 episode of Loveline, lead vocalist Ville Valo confirmed that the song was inspired by skateboarder Brandon Novak, who blamed his heroin addiction on a need to, as he put it, "kill the loneliness". The song is playable in the 2010 video game Rock Band 3.

== Music video ==
There are two versions of the song's music video, a European and U.S. version, the latter of which was filmed in April 2006 and released in May. Making a guest appearance in the U.S. version of the video is tattoo artist Kat Von D, known from the reality television series LA Ink and Miami Ink.

== Track listing ==
Finnish track listing

1. "Killing Loneliness" – 4:29
2. "Wings of a Butterfly" (live) – 3:26
3. "Play Dead" (live) – 4:00

German track listing

1. "Killing Loneliness" – 4:29
2. "The Cage" – 4:17
3. "Wings of a Butterfly" (live) – 3:26
4. "Under the Rose" (live) – 3:55
5. "Killing Loneliness" (video) - 4:01

Japanese track listing (EP)

1. "Killing Loneliness" – 4:29
2. "Under the Rose" (live) – 3:55
3. "Wings of a Butterfly" (live) – 3:26
4. "Play Dead" (live) – 4:00
5. "Vampire Heart" (live) – 5:13
6. "The Cage" (Album version) – 4:17

UK track listing

1. "Killing Loneliness" – 4:29
2. "Under the Rose" (live) – 3:55
  - Live versions from the gig at Philadelphia 2005.

== Charts ==
| Chart | Peak position |
|---|---|
| Austrian Singles Chart | 56 |
| Finnish Singles Chart | 2 |
| German Singles Chart | 32 |
| Irish Singles Chart | 45 |
| Swiss Singles Chart | 44 |
| UK Singles Chart | 26 |
