= The Funeral of Hearts =

Single by HIM

from the album Love Metal
- Released: 13 March 2003
- Recorded: 2003
- Genre: Hard rock
- Length: 3:37
- Label: BMG
- Songwriter(s): Ville Valo
- Producer(s): HIM

HIM singles chronology
"'Heartache Every Moment & Close to the Flame'" (2002)	"The Funeral of Hearts" (2003)	"Buried Alive By Love" (2003)

"The Funeral of Hearts" is a song by the Finnish band HIM, released in 2003. It is the second track and first single from the album Love Metal. It is one of HIM's most popular songs and was usually used to close live shows. It was nominated for the Kerrang! Award for Best Single.

A music video was filmed for the song, produced by Stefan Lindfors. It was filmed in the surroundings of Umeå, Sweden. It shows the band performing in a dream-like winter atmosphere in Lapland, and encountering mythical creatures. In 2004 it won a Kerrang! award for Best Video.

== Track listing ==
International release

1. "The Funeral of Hearts" (radio edit)
2. "The Funeral of Hearts" (album version)
3. "The Funeral of Hearts" (acoustic version)

Finnish, German and Russian EP

1. "The Funeral of Hearts" (radio edit)
2. "The Funeral of Hearts" (album version)
3. "The Funeral of Hearts" (acoustic version)
4. "Soul on Fire" (Erich Zann's Supernatural remix)
5. "The Funeral of Hearts" (Dr. Dagon's Dub)
6. "Enhanced CD content":
  - The Funeral of Hearts (video)

UK Vol. 1 DVD release

1. "The Funeral of Hearts" (video) - 3:37
2. "Join Me in Death" (video – ice version; fan's choice) – 3:39
3. Video documentary footage – from Bam Margera's making of "Sacrament" (video excerpts) – 2:00
4. Metal Hammer's photo gallery with "Sacrament" Disrhythm Remix audio accompaniment
5. "Lonely Road" (live – audio; Daniel Lioneye cover) – 3:38
6. "The Funeral of Hearts" (acoustic version – audio) – 4:02
7. "The Funeral of Hearts" (Dr. Dagon's Dub – audio) – 4:09

UK Vol. 2 release

1. "The Funeral of Hearts" (radio edit)
2. "Hand of Doom" (live edit in Turku; Black Sabbath cover)

UK Vol. 3 release

1. "The Funeral of Hearts" (radio edit)
2. "Buried Alive By Love" (Deliverance version)
3. "The Funeral of Hearts" (acoustic version)
4. "The Funeral of Hearts" (radio edit)
5. "The Sacrament" (Disrhythm Remix)
6. "The Funeral of Hearts" (album version)

== Charts ==
Chart performance for "The Funeral of Hearts"
Chart (2003–2004)	Peak position
Austria (Ö3 Austria Top 40)	26
Finland (Suomen virallinen lista)	1
Germany (GfK)	3
Hungary (Single Top 40)	5
Switzerland (Schweizer Hitparade)	24
UK Singles (OCC)	15
