= Stefan Lindfors =

Finnish designer

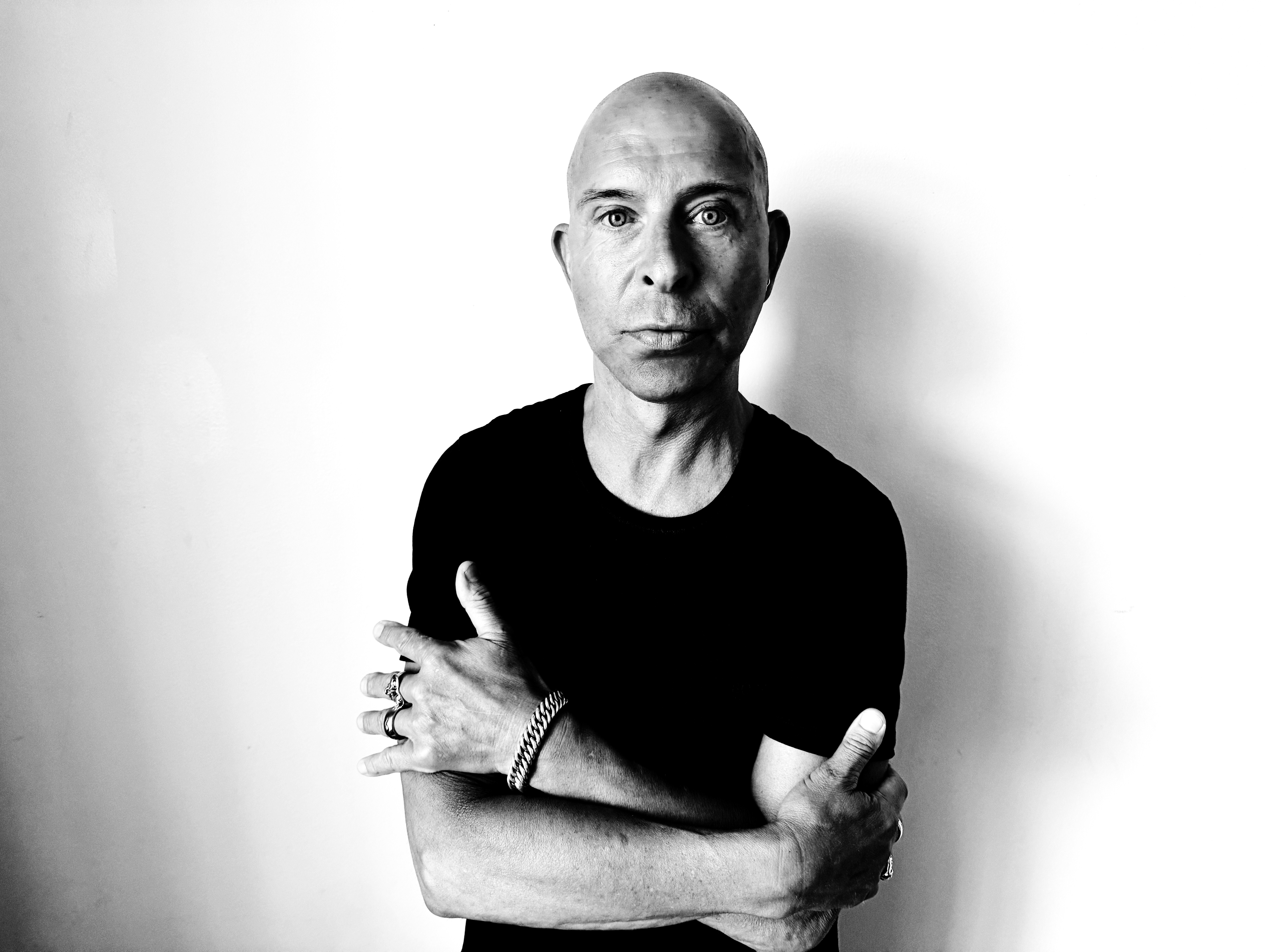
- Stefan Lindfors in 2024
- Born: 3 May 1962 (age 64)
- Occupation: Finnish designer

Erik Stefan Lindfors (born 3 May 1962, Mariehamn), known as Stefan Lindfors, is a Finnish industrial designer, interior designer, film-maker and sculptor. He attended high school at the Åbo Cathedral School in Turku in 1982, and then went on to study design at the University of Art and Design Helsinki, completing his studies in 1988.

Lindfors first achieved public and critical attention with his lamp “Scaragoo”, first unveiled at the Milan Furniture Fair in 1988, and then manufactured by the company Ingo Maurer in Munich. He has also designed objects for the Finnish design manufacturers Arabia, Iittala, Marimekko and Martela. In addition to design, Lindfors has also made short films, TV programmes, commercials (including: Nokia, and DNA Oy) and pop videos (including HIM's ”Funeral of Hearts” - which received music magazine Kerrang!’s award for "Best Music Video 2004").

Lindfors has also been a teacher and guest professor in a number of design schools, including University of Art and Design Helsinki. In 1993 Lindfors took on the commission to create a new design education programme at the Kansas City Art Institute (KCAI), Missouri, USA.

Among the many awards Lindfors has received are the Väinö Tanner Trailblazer Award (1992), the Milan Triennale Medal of Honour (1986), The Georg Jensen Prize (1992), Association of Finnish Interior Architects: Best Interior (1993), The Chicago Athenaeum Good Design Award (1996 and 2010), Design Plus Frankfurt (1999), and the Tokyo Design Award (2001).
