= The Sacrament (song) =

Single by HIM

from the album Love Metal
- Released: 27 June 2003
- Recorded: 2003
- Length: 4:32
- Label: BMG
- Songwriter(s): Ville Valo
- Producer(s): HIM

HIM singles chronology
"Buried Alive by Love" (2003)	"The Sacrament" (2003)	"Solitary Man" (2004)

"The Sacrament" is a song by the Finnish band HIM, released in 2003. It is the sixth track and third single from the album Love Metal. The music video was directed by Bam Margera. The song was used over the end credits of the 2007 Japanese anime, Highlander: The Search for Vengeance.

== Track listing ==
=== Finnish/German standard version ===
All lyrics are written by Ville Valo

No.	Title	Length
1.	"The Sacrament" (radio edit)	3:30
2.	"Buried Alive By Love" (live)	4:58
3.	"The Sacrament" (acoustic version)	3:08

=== Finnish/German digipak - EP release ===
No.	Title	Length
1.	"The Sacrament" (radio edit)	3:30
2.	"Buried Alive By Love" (live)	4:58
3.	"The Sacrament" (acoustic version)	3:08
4.	"Buried Alive By Love" (Deliverance version)	6:04
5.	"The Sacrament" (Dysrhythim Remix)	4:43
6.	"The Sacrament" (music video)	3:30

=== UK version Vol. 1 Enhanced CD ===
No.	Title	Length
1.	"The Sacrament" (radio edit)	3:30
2.	"Sigillum Diaboli"	3:53
3.	"One Last Time"	5:10
4.	"The Sacrament" (music video)	3:30
5.	"Photo Gallery"
6.	"Soul On Fire" ([Video - Live In Hamburg])	2:00
7.	"Fanbase Names Part 1st"

=== UK version Vol. 2 Enhanced CD ===
No.	Title	Length
1.	"The Sacrament" (radio edit)	3:30
2.	"Again"	3:29
3.	"In Joy & Sorrow" (string version)	5:02
4.	"In Joy & Sorrow" (music video)	3:33
5.	"Photo gallery"
6.	"Beyond Redemption" ([Video - Live In Hamburg])	2:00
7.	"Fanbase Names Part 2nd"

=== UK version Vol. 3 ===
No.	Title	Length
1.	"The Sacrament" (Album Version)	4:30
2.	"Please Don't Let It Go" (Album Version)	4:30
3.	"The 9th Circle" (OLT)	5:11

== Charts ==
Chart performance for "The Sacrament"
Chart (2003)	Peak position
Austria (Ö3 Austria Top 40)	47
Finland (Suomen virallinen lista)	4
Germany (GfK)	22
Hungary (Single Top 40)	9
Switzerland (Schweizer Hitparade)	71
UK Singles (OCC)	23
