= Greatest Lovesongs Vol. 666 =

Studio album by HIM
- Released: 3 November 1997
- Recorded: 1997
- Studios: MD-Studios in Munkkiniemi; Peacemakers Studio in Jokela
- Genre: Gothic metal
- Length: 66:06
- Label: BMG
- Producer: Hiili Hiilesmaa

HIM chronology
666 Ways to Love: Prologue (1996)	Greatest Lovesongs Vol. 666 (1997)	Razorblade Romance (2000)

Singles from Greatest Lovesongs Vol. 666
- 1. "When Love and Death Embrace" Released: October 1997; 2. "Your Sweet Six Six Six" Released: February 1998; 3. "Wicked Game" Released: September 1998

Greatest Lovesongs Vol. 666 is the debut studio album by Finnish rock band HIM. The album was recorded in fifteen days during the summer of 1997 with producer Hiili Hiilesmaa, whom vocalist Ville Valo has credited as the honorary sixth member of the band due his help in honing the band's sound, and released on 3 November 1997. Musically Greatest Lovesongs Vol. 666 has been described as a combination of heavy metal and 1980s rock and goth, with lyrics centered around themes of love and death. The album also features the only writing credits from guitarist Mikko "Linde" Lindström in the band's history, and is their only album to feature keyboardist Antto Melasniemi and drummer Juhana "Pätkä" Rantala.

Greatest Lovesongs Vol. 666 received positive reviews from critics, who commended the album's diversity and overall sound. The album peaked at number four in Finland and at number 50 in Germany, later going platinum in the former. Three singles were released, two of which reached the top ten in Finland, with music videos also being produced for two. HIM would later go on to win "Debut Album of the Year", as well as "Newcomer of the Year", at the 1997 Emma Awards. After a supporting tour across Finland, Greatest Lovesongs Vol. 666 received its international release in late 1998, which was followed by the band's first tour abroad in Germany.

== Production ==
HIM began recording their debut album in the northern summer of 1997. The drums, bass and guitars were recorded at MD-Studios in Munkkiniemi, while the vocals and keyboards were recorded at Peacemakers Studios in Jokela. All in all the recording process took fifteen days, while the album was mixed in approximately one week. Due to HIM's minimal studio experience, producer Hiili Hiilesmaa played a key role in honing the band's sound, and was touted as the honorary sixth member of the group by vocalist Ville Valo. When recording began, HIM had eight songs ready for the album, two of which ("Wicked Game" and "The Heartless") were previously recorded for the group's 1996 EP 666 Ways to Love: Prologue. After initial recording ended, the album clocked in at 32 minutes, which the band's record label BMG felt was too short. As a result, HIM opted to include a cover of Blue Öyster Cult's "(Don't Fear) the Reaper" on the record, which the band had recorded the previous winter. The track also featured guest vocals by Sanna-June Hyde, an old school friend of Valo's and guitarist Linde Lindström's ex-girlfriend. During the album's mastering process, Hiili Hiilesmaa and Pauli Saastamoinen added an effect at the end "It's All Tears (Drown in This Love)", where the stereo sound breaks, which later caused many people to return the album to stores, believing they had received a faulty copy.

Valo had originally envisioned the album's front cover as featuring a replica of his body that would slowly turn into a skeleton as it went down. Due to minimal funds and time constraints, the band were unable to fulfill this idea, instead opting for a more traditional photo session with Vertti Teräsvuori. The finished cover art was meant as a combination of goth and eroticism with its dark red color scheme, while Valo posing was described as a "Jeanne d'Arc–style tortured figure". BMG were not fond of the finished artwork, feeling that it evoked too much of a "Billy Idol vibe" by just having one band member on the cover. The label also protested to the band's idea of having the name HIM barely visible on the cover. "For You" was also chosen as the first track on the album at the insistence of BMG, with "Intro" in parentheses. According to Valo, this was done because the label didn't want people just listening to the long opening of the song, thinking the whole album would be like that. "Your Sweet Six Six Six" was later switched out as the opening track on the international edition of the album.

== Music and lyrics ==
"When Love and Death Embrace" (1997)
"When Love and Death Embrace" was chosen as the first single from the album, and Valo later spoke of the song having "something that we've very rarely been able touch since".

The sound of Greatest Lovesongs Vol. 666 has been described as a combination of heavy metal and 1980s rock and goth music, with Valo citing Type O Negative as the main influence on the album. Lyrically the material is heavy on symbolism centered around love and death, a theme that would continue through the band's later work as well. As a whole however, Valo has described the album as much more "serious" than the band's later releases, stating: "I guess I was a bit humorless back then. I thought we were really making some fucking fine art or something, and in hindsight, I realized that maybe it wasn't quite like that." The album opens with "For You", which features a '50s-style guitar intro, inspired by Chris Isaak's "Wicked Game", while the main riff of the song is taken from "Bloody Hammer" by Roky Erickson. "For You", along with "Our Diabolikal Rapture", are the only two HIM-songs to date to be co-written by guitarist Linde Lindström. The latter of the two tracks came to be after Valo heard Lindström playing a riff, which they then modified to be more "stonery". This eventually evolved into "Our Diabolikal Rapture", which Valo described as "progressive, yet catchy". "Your Sweet Six Six Six" is a love song about how "when another person does you harm, but still it's so fucking hard to let go. You're not even sure if you want to let go" according to Valo. The title was inspired by the alleged backmasking featured on Led Zeppelin's "Stairway to Heaven", where TV evangelist Paul Crouch claimed that, when played backwards, satanic messages can be heard in the song, including the phrase "Here's to my sweet Satan". The use of the number 666 was also seen by the band as purely "symbolic" and "traditionally rock 'n' roll", not indicative of Satanism.

"The Heartless" was inspired by Valo's first crush, who fell in love with his best friend, whom Valo felt was being "completely heartless" to her. "When Love and Death Embrace" was chosen as the first single from the album by BMG Finland's Asko Kallonen, who felt that the song "represented HIM at its core", to which Valo agreed, touting it as being a good representation of the band overall. The verse-chords of the song are taken from the soundtrack to the TV series Twin Peaks, while the use of a Moog synthesizer later became a "trademark of HIM" according to Valo. The banging sounds featured on "The Beginning of the End" were achieved by the band hitting trash bins in a cellar, while the opening riff was performed by Valo, as Lindström was not present at the studio and the band wanted "the world's shittiest sound played badly", which they believed Lindström could not provide. "Wicked Game" was originally released in 1989 by Chris Isaak on his album Heart Shaped World. A year later the song was used in the David Lynch film Wild at Heart, which is where Valo first heard it. Around this time, HIM were low on original material and thus decided to add "Wicked Game" to their repertoire. According to Valo, the song played an integral part in HIM's evolution, helping them develop their own sound. "(Don't Fear) The Reaper" was originally released by American rock band Blue Öyster Cult on their 1976 album Agents of Fortune. The Romeo and Juliet-inspired lyrics of the song convinced Valo to record it as a duet, explaining: "I never understood the manliness of the original by Blue Öyster Cult, as [the song] is clearly an exchange between a man and a woman. I thought it would be more interesting to make a version, where a boy and a girl decide you don't have to be afraid".

== Release and promotion ==
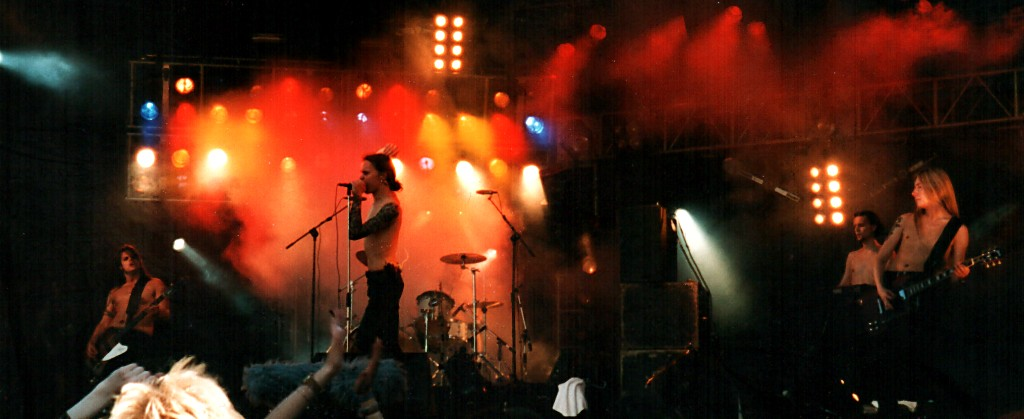
HIM performing at Provinssirock in June 1999

"When Love and Death Embrace" was released as the first single from the album in October 1997, debuting at number twelve on the Finnish Singles Chart, before peaking at number nine two weeks later. A music video, directed by Mikko Pitkänen, was also produced. Also in October, HIM held a showcase for members of the music industry at the Music and Media Expo in Tampere. Greatest Lovesongs Vol. 666 was released on 3 November 1997, debuting at number eleven on the Finnish Albums Chart, before peaking at number four a week later, eventually being certified gold and later platinum. On the day of the album's release, HIM held a party at King's Kakadu, a strip club in Helsinki, where they performed three songs by Rauli "Badding" Somerjoki, dressed in suits with slicked-back hair, as well as '50s-style instruments. Afterwards HIM performed a sold-out show at the Tavastia Club in Helsinki.

The official supporting tour for Greatest Lovesongs Vol. 666 began in mid-December 1997 at the Maxim in Kuopio. "Your Sweet Six Six Six" and "Wicked Game" were released as the follow-up singles from the album, with the former charting at number nine in Finland and the latter receiving a music video, directed by Markus Walter. HIM would go on to win "Newcomer of the Year" and "Debut Album of the Year" at the Finnish Emma Awards in 1998. Greatest Lovesongs Vol. 666 was released internationally a year after its initial Finnish release, charting at number 56 in Germany. The album would re-enter the German Albums Chart in 2000, peaking at number 50. Prior to the album's release, HIM were invited to play two festival dates in Germany, followed by a fourteen date tour across the country in the fall. Before the start of the tour, keyboardist Antto Melasniemi was let go from the band, being replaced by Jussi-Mikko "Juska" Salminen. After returning to Finland, HIM also decided to part ways with drummer Juhana "Pätkä" Rantala, who was replaced by Mika "Gas Lipstick" Karppinen before the start of another German tour.

== Reception ==
Professional ratings
Review scores
Source	Rating
Allmusic	4/5 stars
Rock Hard	9/10
Rumba	9/10
Soundi	4/5 stars

Greatest Lovesongs Vol. 666 received positive reviews from critics. Holger Stratmann of Rock Hard gave the album nine out of ten, and declared it "one of the best debut albums of the year". He singled out "You Sweet Six Six Six" as a particular highlight, and described the album as a "good start for a newcomer band". Rumba's Johanna Kiiski also gave the album nine out of ten, describing it as delivering on all expectations set-up by 666 Ways to Love: Prologue. She gave praise to the musicianship and melodies, and ultimately hailed Greatest Lovesongs Vol. 666 as "the best metal album of the year". Allmusic reviewer Antti J. Ravelin awarded the album four stars out of five, and commended the album's "diverse sound" and the band's "sense for dynamics instead of playing just quiet or loud". Ravelin concluded his review by stating that the album "succeeds in pleasing everyone, whether they're into rock or pop", and singled out "It's All Tears (Drown in This Love)" and "The Beginning of the End" as particular highlights. Marjo Kreku of Soundi, who also gave the album four stars out of five, felt similarly, commending the album's versatility and stating that "the band achieve an unparalleled whole" with Greatest Lovesongs Vol. 666. Kreku concluded that the album "is a great record, that only needs candlelight and red wine to keep it company", and praised "When Love and Death Embrace" as the album's "most fruitful piece".

In 2017, Valo revisited Greatest Lovesongs Vol. 666, and called it "a first-timer's endearing virginal exploration", stating: "First you're ashamed of it for a couple of years, then you understand its good parts". Loudwire later ranked Greatest Lovesongs Vol. 666 as HIM's third best album, and described it as "incredibly raw" and "easily the heaviest album in [the band's] discography". On the other hand, KaaosZine ranked the album lowest in HIM's discography, commending the album's "dark atmosphere and ragged sound", but stating that "you can clearly hear a band still trying to find themselves [on the album]".

In 2020, it was named one of the 20 best metal albums of 1997 by Metal Hammer magazine.

== Track listing ==
All tracks written by Ville Valo, except where noted.

Original track listing (1997)
No.	Title	Writer(s)	Length
1.	"For You (Intro)"	Linde Lindström, Ville Valo	4:00
2.	"Your Sweet Six Six Six"		4:12
3.	"Wicked Game" (Chris Isaak cover)	Chris Isaak	3:54
4.	"The Heartless"		4:03
5.	"Our Diabolikal Rapture"	Teemu Järvinen, Linde Lindström, Ville Valo	5:21
6.	"It's All Tears (Drown in This Love)"		3:44
7.	"When Love and Death Embrace"		6:08
8.	"The Beginning of the End"		4:07
9.	"(Don't Fear) The Reaper" (Blue Öyster Cult cover)	Buck Dharma	6:30
66.	Untitled (Tracks 10–65 consist of silence that last different lengths. Track 66 has silence until 5:49, when the instrumental outro of "The Heartless", from the band's 1996 EP 666 Ways to Love: Prologue, plays until the end.)		7:51
Total length:			66:06

International track listing (1998)
No.	Title	Writer(s)	Length
1.	"Your Sweet Six Six Six"		4:12
2.	"Wicked Game" (Chris Isaak cover)	Isaak	3:54
3.	"The Heartless"		4:03
4.	"Our Diabolikal Rapture"	Järvinen, Lindström, Valo	5:21
5.	"It's All Tears (Drown in This Love)"		3:44
6.	"When Love and Death Embrace"		6:08
7.	"The Beginning of the End"		4:07
8.	"(Don't Fear) The Reaper" (Blue Öyster Cult cover)	Dharma	6:30
9.	"For You"	Lindström, Valo	4:00
66.	Untitled (Tracks 10–65 consist of silence that last different lengths. Track 66 has silence until 5:49, when the instrumental outro of "The Heartless", from the band's 1996 EP 666 Ways to Love: Prologue, plays until the end.)		7:51
Total length:			66:06

Remastered edition bonus disc (2014)
No.	Title	Writer(s)	Length
1.	"Your Sweet Six Six Six" (live at Helldone TRE MMXIII)		4:11
2.	"It's All Tears" (ACSTC Live G&T Version)		3:51
3.	"Our Diabolikal Rapture" (live at Rockpalast MM)	Järvinen, Lindström, Valo	5:05
4.	"The Heartless" (ACSTC Pascha MMXIV)		2:40
5.	"Stigmata Diaboli" (live at Caribia TKU MMII)		3:01
6.	"For You" (ACSTC Live G&T Version)	Lindström, Valo	4:07
7.	"The Beginning of the End" (live at Provinssirock MCMXCIX)		4:13
8.	"When Love and Death Embrace" (live at Center Stage GA MMXIV)		7:23
Total length:			34:31

== Personnel ==
HIM

- Ville Valo − lead vocals
- Mikko "Linde" Lindström − guitar
- Mikko "Mige" Paananen − bass
- Antto Melasniemi − keyboards
- Juhana "Pätkä" Rantala − drums

Guest musicians

- June Hyde − vocals on "(Don't Fear) The Reaper"
- Asta Hannula − vocals on "For You"

Production

- Hiili Hiilesmaa − production, engineering, mixing
- Pauli Saastamoinen − mastering
- Vertti Teräsvuori − photography
- Kira Gluschkoff − photography
- Guido − make-up
- Janne Uotila − graphic design

== Charts ==
Chart	Peak position
Finnish Albums Chart	9
German Albums Chart	50
US Heatseekers Albums	31^{[A]}
US Vinyl Albums	13^{[B]}

Notes
A. Peaked on 1 October 2005
B. Peaked on 10 January 2015

== Certifications ==
Region	Certification	Certified units/sales
Finland (Musiikkituottajat)	Platinum	68,719
Germany	—	70,000
