= Buried Alive by Love =

Single by HIM

from the album Love Metal
- Released: 5 May 2003
- Recorded: 2003
- Songwriter(s): Ville Valo
- Producer(s): HIM

HIM singles chronology
"The Funeral of Hearts" (2003)	"Buried Alive by Love" (2003)	"The Sacrament" (2003)

"Buried Alive by Love" is a song by the Finnish rock band HIM, released in 2003. It is the first track and second single from the album Love Metal. The music video was directed by Bam Margera. Margera has also directed three other music videos for the band, those being "The Sacrament", "Solitary Man" and "And Love Said No". The music video features actress Juliette Lewis.

== Track listings ==
International release

1. "Buried Alive by Love" (radio edit)
2. "Buried Alive by Love" (live in Helsinki)

UK Vol. 1 release

1. "Buried Alive by Love" (radio edit) - 3:58
2. "Wicked Game" (international radio edit) (Chris Isaak cover) - 4:04
3. "I've Crossed Oceans of Wine to Find You" - 4:39
4. "Wicked Game" (video) (Chris Isaak cover)
5. Ville Valo Interview Footage Pt. 1
6. Print-off Gallery

UK Vol. 2 release

1. "Buried Alive by Love" (radio edit) - 3:58
2. "Join Me in Death" (Razorblade mix)- 3:39
3. "Rebel Yell" (live) (Billy Idol cover)- 5:12
4. "Buried Alive by Love" (video)
5. Ville Valo Interview Footage Pt. 2
6. Print-off Gallery

UK Vol. 3 release

1. "Buried Alive by Love" (radio edit)
2. "When Love and Death Embrace"

Scandinavian release

1. "Buried Alive by Love" (radio edit)
2. "Buried Alive by Love" (live in Helsinki)
3. "Lonely Road" (live) (Daniel Lioneye cover)
4. "Hand of Doom" (live in Turku) (Black Sabbath cover)

German release

1. "Buried Alive by Love" (radio edit)
2. "Buried Alive by Love" (live in Helsinki)
3. "Lonely Road" (live) (Daniel Lioneye cover)
4. "Hand of Doom" (live in Turku) (Black Sabbath cover)
5. "Buried Alive by Love" (video)

== Charts ==
Chart performance for "Buried Alive by Love"
Chart (2003)	Peak position
Austria (Ö3 Austria Top 40)	66
Germany (GfK)	27
Switzerland (Schweizer Hitparade)	98
UK Singles (OCC)	30
