= List of the Mission band members =

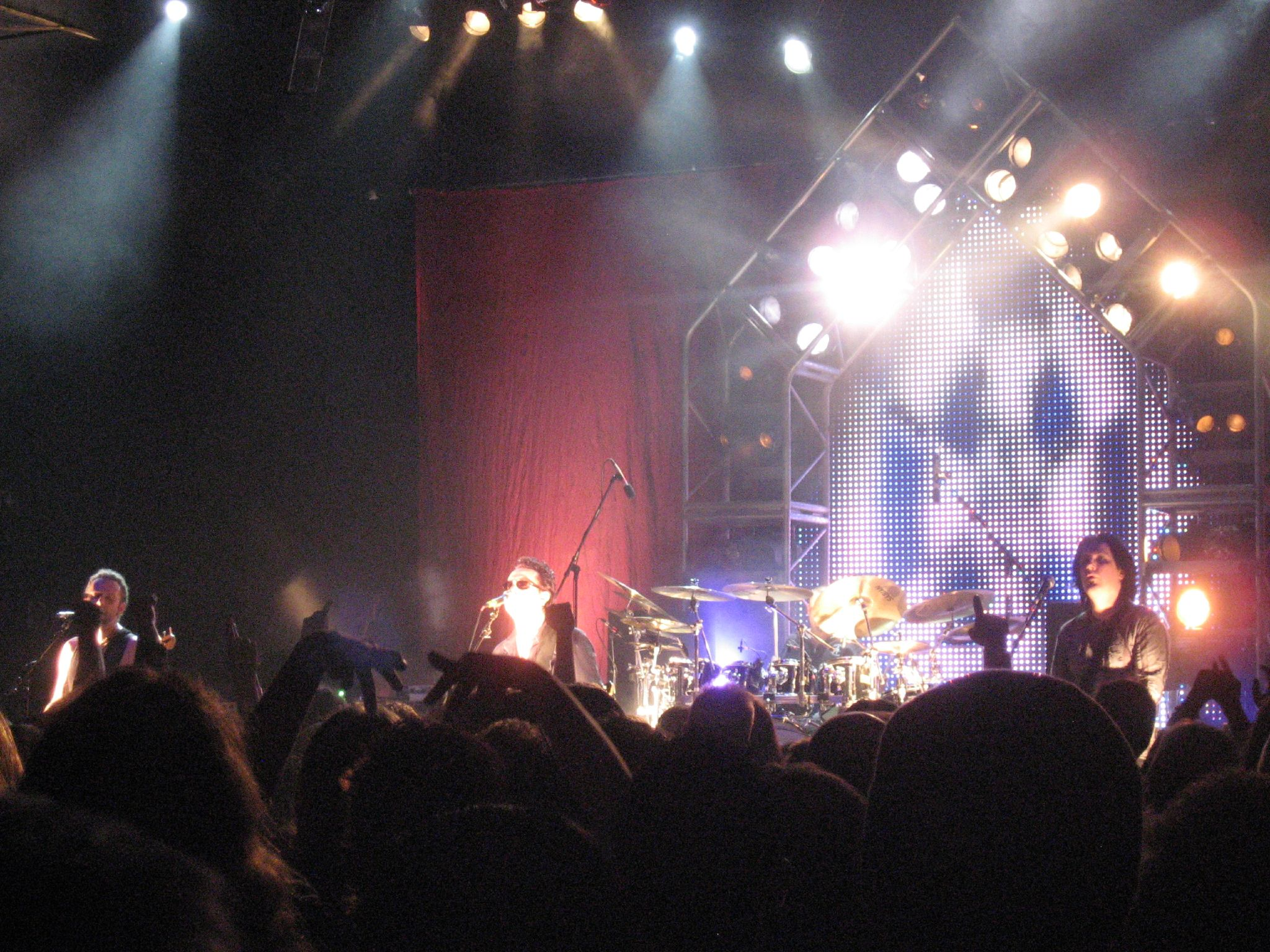
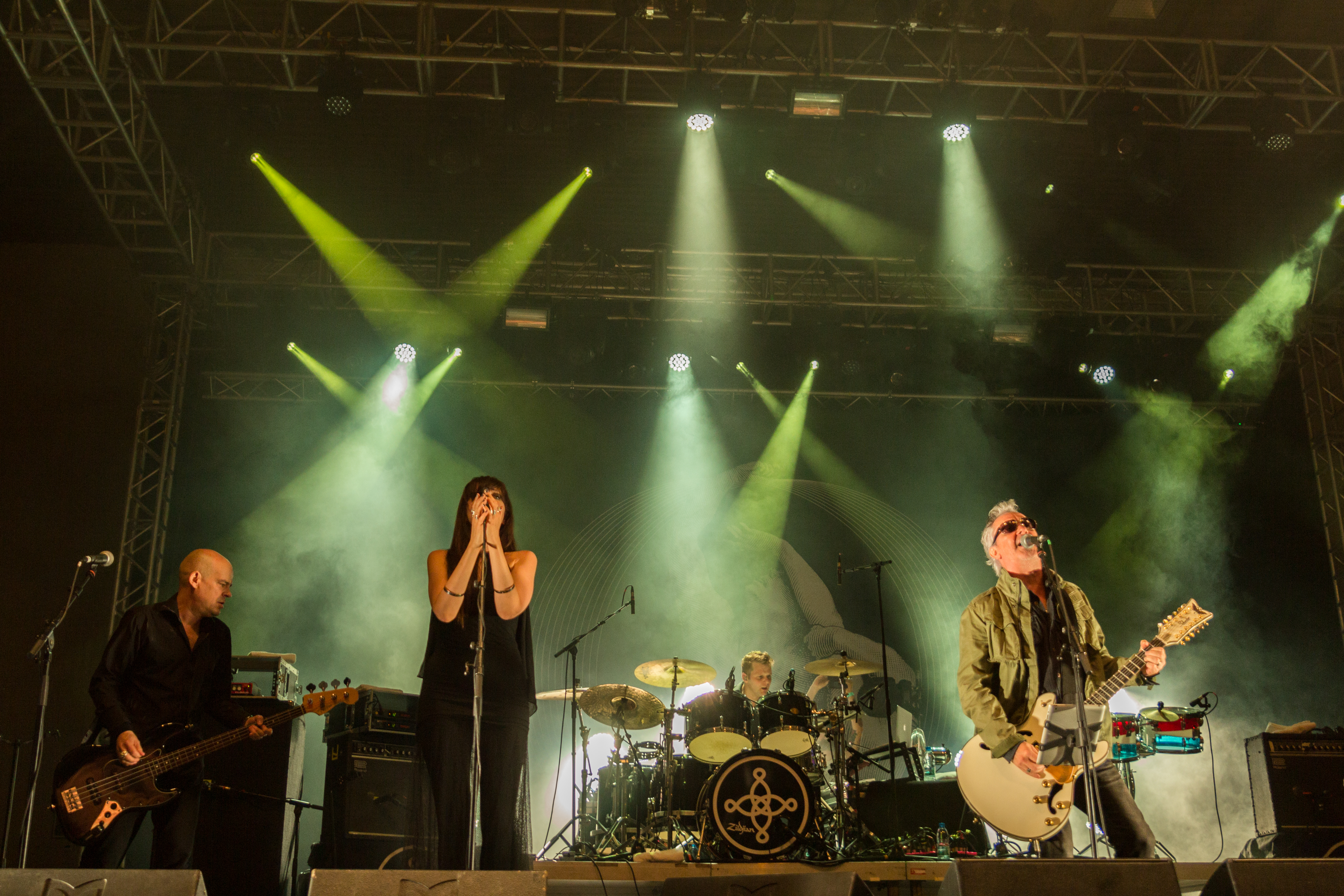
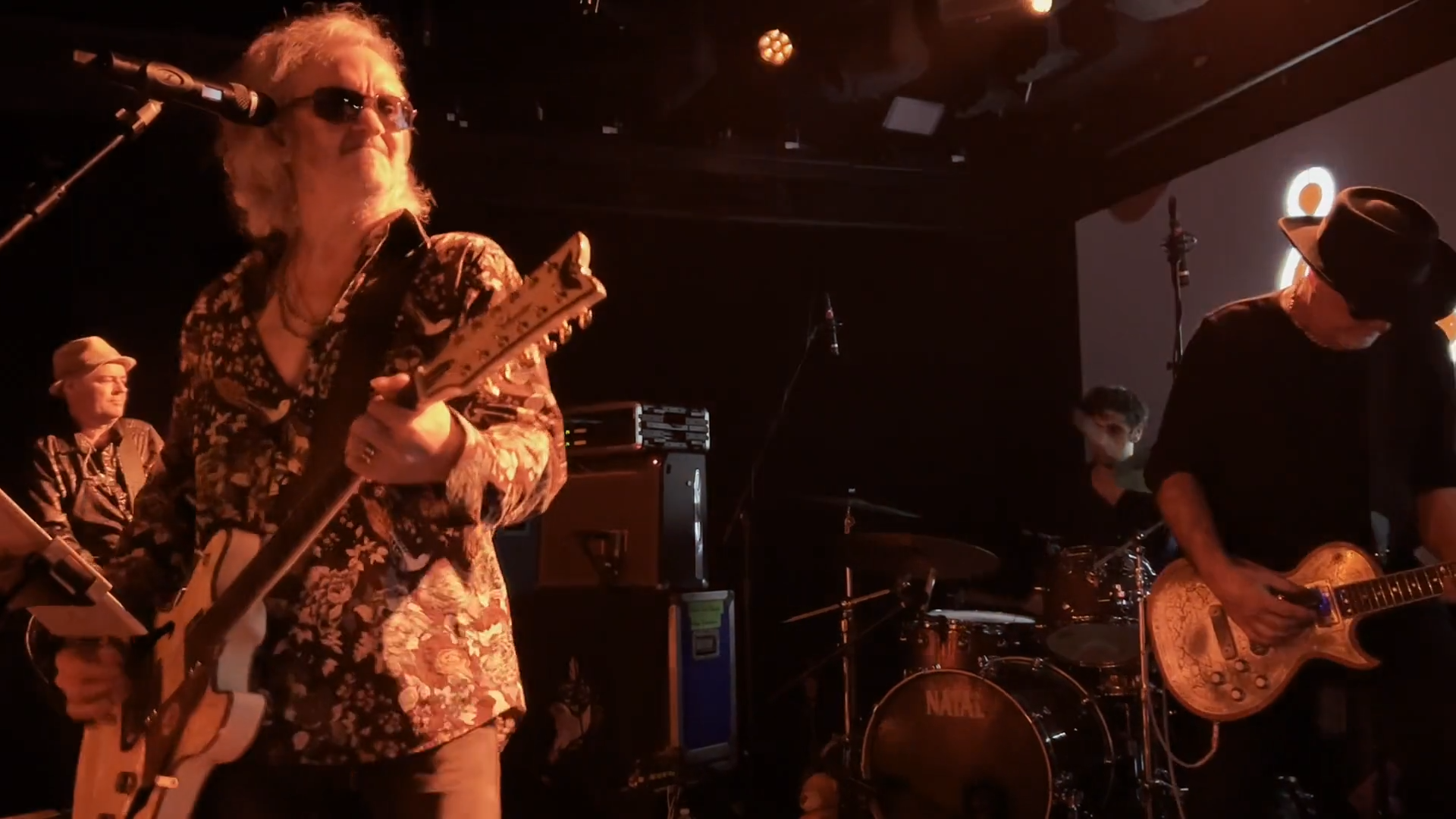
Three line-ups of The Mission performing in 2008, 2017 and 2023

The Mission are an English gothic rock band founded by singer/guitarist Wayne Hussey and bassist Craig Adams, who were soon joined by drummer Mick Brown and guitarist/keyboardist Simon Hinkler. The band currently consists of Hussey (the sole constant member), Adams (who was absent between 1992 and 1999, and 2002 and 2011), Hinkler (who was absent between 1990 and 2011) and drummer Alex Baum (since 2022).

== History ==
In summer 1985, Hussey and Adams left the Sisters of Mercy, they were first joined by Mick Brown, of Red Lorry Yellow Lorry, on drums after refusing to use a drum machine. To be a live band, they were joined by guitarist Simon Hinkler (who was then playing keyboards in Artery). The band released God's Own Medicine (1986), Children (1988) and Carved in Sand (1990) before Hinkler left in May 1990. Hinkler was replaced first by David Wolfenden, then Tim Bricheno, and then Paul "Etch" Etchells.

The band was reduced to a trio for recording Masque (1992). By the time it came to touring the band consisted of Hussey, Brown, guitarist Mark Thwaite, keyboardist Rick Carter and bassist Matthew Parkin. Parkin was replaced by Andy Hobson in 1993, and then by Andy Cousin. This new line-up played on Neverland (1995) and Blue (1996) before breaking up in 1996.

Hussey reformed the band in 1999, with Adams and Thwaite returning alongside new drummer Scott Garrett. Thwaite was replaced by Rob Holliday in 2001. Richard Vernon replaced Adams in 2002. Garrett was replace by Steve Spring in late 2003. Thwaite returned in 2005. The band disbanded again in 2008.

The original line-up, minis Brown, who had stopped drumming over 15 years ago, returned. Hussey, Adams and Hinkler were joined by drummer Mike Kelly. The reunited band released The Brightest Light (2013) and Another Fall from Grace (2016). Kelly left in March 2022, he was replaced by Alex Baum.

== Band members ==
=== Current ===
Image	Name	Years active	Instruments	Release contributions
	Wayne Hussey	1986–1996; 1999–2008; 2011–present	lead vocals; guitars; keyboards; piano	all releases
	Craig Adams	1986–1992; 1999–2002; 2011–present	bass; backing vocals	all releases except Neverland (1995), Blue (1996) and God Is a Bullet (2007)
	Simon Hinkler	1986–1990; 2011–present	guitars; keyboards	all releases from God's Own Medicine (1986) to Grains of Sand (1990) and from God Is a Bullet (2007) onwards; "No Snow, No Show" for the Eskimo (1993); Salad Daze (1994)
	Alex Baum	2022–present	drums	none to date

=== Former ===
Image	Name	Years active	Instruments	Release contributions
	Mick Brown	1986–1996	drums	all releases from God's Own Medicine (1986) to Blue (1996)
	David Wolfenden	1990	guitars	"No Snow, No Show" for the Eskimo (1993)
	Tim Bricheno	1990	guitars	God Is a Bullet (2007)
	Paul "Etch" Etchells	1990	guitars; keyboards	none
	Mark Thwaite	1992–1996; 1999–2001; 2005–2008	guitars; mandolin	all releases from Neverland (1995) to God Is a Bullet (2007)
	Rick Carter	1992–1996	keyboards	Neverland (1995); Blue (1996)
	Matthew Parkin	1992–1993	bass	Neverland (1995) uncredited
	Andy Hobson	1993	bass	Neverland (1995) uncredited
	Andy Cousin	1993–1996	bass	Neverland (1995); Blue (1996)
	Scott Garrett	1999–2003	drums	Ever After (2000); Aura (2001)
	Rob Holliday	2001–2005	guitars	none
	Richard Vernon	2002–2008	bass; backing vocals	God Is a Bullet (2007)
	Steve Spring	2003–2008 (died 2020)	drums	God Is a Bullet (2007)
	Mike Kelly	2011–2022	drums	The Brightest Light (2013); Another Fall from Grace (2016)
