= The Mission discography =

- Studio albums: 10
- Extended plays: 5
- Live albums: 11
- Compilation albums: 14
- Singles: 30
- Video albums: 10
- Box sets: 3

This is a list of all recordings released by the English gothic rock band the Mission (known as the Mission UK in the US for legal reasons).

== Albums ==
=== Studio albums ===
Title	Album details	Peak chart positions										Certifications
Title	Album details	UK	UK Indie	AUT	BE (WA)	GER	NL	NZ	SWE	SWI	US	Certifications
God's Own Medicine	Released: 10 November 1986; Label: Mercury; Formats: CD, LP, MC	14	—	—	—	59	—	—	30	—	108	UK: Silver
Children	Released: 29 February 1988; Label: Mercury; Formats: CD, LP, MC	2	—	—	—	33	29	—	20	—	126	UK: Gold
Carved in Sand	Released: 5 February 1990; Label: Mercury; Formats: CD, LP, MC	7	—	25	—	16	33	34	17	7	101	UK: Gold
Masque	Released: 22 June 1992; Label: Vertigo; Formats: CD, LP, MC	23	—	40	—	49	73	—	38	40	—	
Neverland	Released: 13 February 1995; Label: Equator/Neverland; Formats: CD, 2xLP, MC	58	—	—	—	59	—	—	42	42	—	
Blue	Released: 3 June 1996; Label: Equator; Formats: CD, LP, MC	73	—	—	—	—	—	—	—	—	—	
Aura	Released: 5 November 2001; Label: Playground Recordings; Formats: CD, 2xCD, 2xLP, MC	—	—	—	—	85	—	—	—	—	—	
God Is a Bullet	Released: 30 April 2007; Label: Cooking Vinyl; Formats: CD, 2xLP, digital download	—	14	—	—	—	—	—	—	—	—	
The Brightest Light	Released: 20 September 2013; Label: Oblivion/Eyes Wide Shut Recordings; Formats: CD, 2xCD, 2xLP, digital download	—	49	—	—	92	—	—	—	—	—	
Another Fall from Grace	Released: 30 September 2016; Label: Eyes Wide Shut Recordings; Formats: CD, LP, digital download	38	12	—	181	49	—	—	—	—	—	
"—" denotes releases that did not chart or were not released in that territory.

=== Live albums ===
Title	Album details
"No Snow, No Show" for the Eskimo	Released: July 1993; Label: Windsong International; Formats: CD, LP, MC
Ever After – Live	Released: August 2000; Label: Receiver; Formats: CD
Live MMVII	Released: 30 May 2007; Label: Concert Live; Formats: 2xCD-R; Limited release
The First Chapter: Live at London Shepherds Bush Empire	Released: 21 April 2008; Label: Eyes Wide Shut Recordings; Formats: CD
God's Own Medicine: Live at Shepherds Bush Empire	Released: 21 April 2008; Label: Eyes Wide Shut Recordings; Formats: CD
Children: Live at Shepherds Bush Empire	Released: 21 April 2008; Label: Eyes Wide Shut Recordings; Formats: CD
Carved in Sand: Live at London Shepherds Bush Empire	Released: 21 April 2008; Label: Eyes Wide Shut Recordings; Formats: CD
Live & Last	Released: 2 March 2009; Label: Eyes Wide Shut Recordings; Formats: 2xCD
XXV Live at Brixton Academy	Released: 22 October 2011; Label: Abbey Road Live Here Now; Formats: 2xCD-R
Bending the Arc	Released: 11 December 2017; Label: Live Here Now/Eyes Wide Shut Recordings; Formats: 2xCD, 3xLP, digital download
Live at Rockpalast	Released: 27 April 2018; Label: MIG; Formats: 2xCD+DVD

=== Compilation albums ===
Title	Album details	Peak chart positions			
Title	Album details	UK	BE (WA)	GER	SWI
The First Chapter	Released: 22 June 1987; Label: Mercury; Formats: CD, LP, MC	35	—	—	—
Grains of Sand	Released: 22 October 1990; Label: Mercury; Formats: CD, LP, MC	28	—	61	—
Sum and Substance	Released: 7 February 1994; Label: Vertigo; Formats: CD, 2xLP, MC	49	—	—	43
Salad Daze	Released: June 1994; Label: Nighttracks; Formats: CD, LP; Compilation of BBC Radio One sessions	—	—	—	—
Resurrection – Greatest Hits	Released: November 1999; Label: Eagle/Cleopatra; Formats: CD; Consists of re-recordings specifically for this release	—	—	—	—
Tower of Strength	Released: July 2000; Label: Spectrum Music; Formats: CD, MC	—	—	—	—
Aural Delight	Released: 2 December 2002; Label: Playground Recordings; Formats: CD	—	—	—	—
Anthology – The Phonogram Years	Released: 13 March 2006; Label: Mercury; Formats: 2xCD	—	—	—	—
Best of the BBC Recordings	Released: 2008; Label: Mercury/Universal Music; Formats: CD	—	—	—	—
Dum-Dum Bullet	Released: 28 June 2010; Label: Oblivion/Eyes Wide Shut Recordings; Formats: CD	—	—	—	—
Serpents Kiss – The Very Best Of	Released: 19 May 2014; Label: Universal/Spectrum Music; Formats: CD, digital download	—	—	—	—
Singles A's & B's	Released: 1 May 2015; Label: Universal; Formats: 2xCD, digital download	—	—	—	—
A Garden of Earthly Delights: The Mercury Years	Released: 3 September 2021; Label: Universal; Formats: digital download	—	—	—	—
Collected	Released: 22 October 2021; Label: Music on CD/Universal; Formats: 3xCD, 3xLP, digital download	—	101	34	—
"—" denotes releases that did not chart or were not released in that territory.

=== Box sets ===
Title	Album details
Magnificent Pieces	Released: 25 June 1991; Label: Mercury; Formats: 4xCD; Japan-only release
London Shepherd's Bush Empire	Released: 2008; Label: Eyes Wide Shut Recordings; Formats: 4xCD
Live at the BBC	Released: 4 August 2008; Label: Mercury/Universal Music; Formats: 3xCD

=== Video albums ===
Title	Album details
Crusade	Released: 29 May 1987; Label: Channel 5; Formats: VHS
From Dusk to Dawn	Released: October 1988; Label: Channel 5; Formats: VHS, LaserDisc
South America	Released: October 1989; Label: Mish Productions; Formats: VHS
Waves Upon the Sand	Released: 12 February 1990; Label: Channel 5; Formats: VHS, LaserDisc
Absolutely Live (as the Metal Gurus)	Released: 1990; Label: Mish Productions; Formats: VHS
Sum and Substance	Released: 1994; Label: Polygram Video; Formats: VHS
Lighting the Candles	Released: 26 September 2005; Label: Oblivion; Formats: 2xDVD+CD
Gold – The Videos	Released: April 2007; Label: Universal Music DVD Video; Formats: DVD
The Final Chapter	Released: 2 March 2009; Label: Oblivion/Eyes Wide Shut Recordings; Formats: 3xDVD
Silver	Released: 27 October 2012; Label: Eyes Wide Shut Recordings/Echozone; Formats: 2xDVD+CD, 2xBlu-ray

== EPs ==
Title	Album details
Severina	Released: March 1987; Label: Vertigo; Formats: 2x12", MC; Canada-only release
Tower of Strength	Released: 1988; Label: Vertigo; Formats: 12"; Canada-only limited release
Absolutely Live (as the Metal Gurus)	Released: 3 December 1990; Label: Mercury; Formats: 12"; Limited release
Swan Song	Released: 16 December 2013; Label: Eyes Wide Shut Recordings; Formats: CD-R
Different Colours	Released: 30 May 2014; Label: Oblivion/Eyes Wide Shut Recordings; Formats: 2x7", digital download

== Singles ==
Title	Year	Peak chart positions										Album
Title	Year	UK	UK Indie	BE (FL)	GER	IRE	NL	NZ	SPA	US Alt	US Main	Album
"Serpents Kiss" (Note: Also known as the Roman numeral I, as this is the title on the single's sleeve.)	1986	70	2	—	—	—	—	—	—	—	—	The First Chapter
"Garden of Delight"/"Like a Hurricane" (Note: Also known as the Roman numeral II, as this is the title on the single's sleeve.)	1986	49	1	—	—	—	—	—	—	—	—	The First Chapter
"Stay with Me" (Note: Also known as the Roman numeral III, as this is the title on the single's sleeve.)	1986	30	—	—	—	23	—	—	—	—	—	God's Own Medicine
"Wasteland" (Note: Also known as the Roman numeral IV, as this is the title on the single's sleeve.)	1987	11	—	—	—	10	—	—	—	—	—	God's Own Medicine
"Severina" (Note: Also known as the Roman numeral V, as this is the title on the single's sleeve.)	1987	25	—	—	—	21	—	—	—	—	—	God's Own Medicine
"Tower of Strength"	1988	12	—	32	50	10	60	49	—	—	—	Children
"Beyond the Pale"	1988	32	—	—	—	—	—	—	—	—	—	Children
"Butterfly on a Wheel"	1990	12	—	—	—	13	48	36	—	23	—	Carved in Sand
"Deliverance"	1990	27	—	—	—	25	—	—	—	6	27	Carved in Sand
"Into the Blue"	1990	32	—	—	—	—	—	—	18	—	—	Carved in Sand
"Hands Across the Ocean"	1990	28	—	—	—	—	—	—	—	7	—	Grains of Sand
"Merry Xmas Everybody" (as the Metal Gurus)	1990	55	—	—	—	—	—	—	—	—	—	Absolutely Live EP
"Never Again"	1992	34	—	—	—	—	—	—	—	—	—	Masque
"Like a Child Again"	1992	30	—	—	—	—	—	—	—	—	—	Masque
"Shades of Green"	1992	49	—	—	—	—	—	—	—	—	—	Masque
"Tower of Strength" (remix)	1994	33	—	—	—	—	—	—	—	—	—	Sum and Substance
"Afterglow"	1994	53	—	—	—	—	—	—	—	—	—	Sum and Substance
"Raising Cain" (Note: The release that features "Raising Cain" as the lead track was entitled 1 or Mission 1.)	1994	92	—	—	—	—	—	—	—	—	—	Neverland
"Swoon"	1995	73	—	—	—	—	—	—	—	—	—	Neverland
"Lose Myself in You" (Germany-only release)	1995	—	—	—	—	—	—	—	—	—	—	Neverland
"Coming Home" (Europe-only release)	1996	—	—	—	—	—	—	—	—	—	—	Blue
"Evangeline"	2001	115	32	—	—	—	—	—	—	—	—	Aura
"Shine Like the Stars"	2002	—	—	—	—	—	—	—	—	—	—	Aura
"Breathe Me In" (Germany-only limited release)	2005	—	—	—	—	—	—	—	—	—	—	Lighting the Candles
"Keep It in the Family"	2007	—	—	—	—	—	—	—	—	—	—	God Is a Bullet
"Blush"	2007	—	—	—	—	—	—	—	—	—	—	God Is a Bullet
"Sometimes the Brightest Light Comes from the Darkest Place"	2013	—	—	—	—	—	—	—	—	—	—	The Brightest Light
"Atomic Heart"	2014	—	—	—	—	—	—	—	—	—	—	Different Colours EP
"Met-Amor-Phosis"	2016	—	—	—	—	—	—	—	—	—	—	Another Fall From Grace
"Tyranny of Secrets"	2016	—	—	—	—	—	—	—	—	—	—	Another Fall From Grace
"—" denotes releases that did not chart or were not released in that territory.
