= Ever After (The Mission album) =

2000 live album by The Mission

Live album by The Mission
- Released: 2000
- Recorded: 1999
- Genre: Gothic rock
- Length: 76:34
- Label: Receiver Records; RRCD 294
- Producer: Wayne Hussey

The Mission chronology
Blue (1996)	Ever After (2000)	Aura (2001)

Professional ratings
Review scores
Source	Rating
Allmusic	3/5 stars

Ever After is a live album by The Mission. It is compiled from various shows and Wayne Hussey's own archives on the band's 1999 'Resurrection' tour. It was released on CD in 2000 and includes a studio recording of The Osmonds song Crazy Horses previously released as a fan club flexidisc.

== Track listing ==
1. "Intro" - 1:51
2. "Beyond the Pale" - 4:50
3. "Hands Across the Ocean" - 3:28
4. "Into the Blue" - 4:03
5. "Butterfly on a Wheel" - 5:55
6. "Raising Cain" - 5:15
7. "Heaven Knows" - 5:56
8. "Sway" - 4:30
9. "Sacrilege" - 5:39
10. "Swoon" - 5:36
11. "Tower of Strength" - 8:15
12. "Deliverance" - 4:45
13. "Like a Child Again" - 3:36
14. "Can't Help Falling in Love" - 1:58
15. "Like a Hurricane" - 4:52
16. "1969" - 3:06
17. "Crazy Horses" (Studio Recording) - 2:57

== Personnel ==
- Wayne Hussey – vocals, guitar
- Craig Adams – bass
- Mark Gemini Thwaite – guitar
- Scott Garrett – drums
