= Masque (The Mission album) =

1992 studio album by The Mission

Studio album by The Mission
- Released: 22 June 1992
- Genres: Alternative rock; gothic rock
- Length: 51:36
- Label: Mercury
- Producers: Mark Saunders; the Mission

The Mission chronology
Grains of Sand (1990)	Masque (1992)	"No Snow, No Show" for the Eskimo (1993)

Singles from Masque
- 1. "Never Again" Released: 13 April 1992; 2. "Like a Child Again" Released: 1 June 1992; 3. "Shades of Green" Released: 5 October 1992

Masque is the fourth regular studio album by the Mission which was released in June 1992 on the Vertigo sub-label of Mercury Records.

== Production ==
The album included a number of outside collaborators, including Martin Allcock, Anthony Thistlethwaite and Miles Hunt.

== Reception ==
Professional ratings
Review scores
Source	Rating
AllMusic	2.5/5 stars
Select	4/5 stars

Peaking at #23 in the UK albums chart, Masque failed to repeat the commercial success of the Mission's previous two official studio albums and marked the beginning of the Mission's decline in popularity; it was also the band's last album to achieve a UK top 40 position, until the release of Another Fall from Grace in September 2016. AllMusic suggests that the band's change in musical direction was to blame for the album's weak reception, writing that Masque "doesn't sound like the Mission, but rather like a band trying to find its direction." PopMatters discussed the album's reception in a review of the band's subsequent Aura album, writing, "Some argue that Hussey started to wander off the path with Neverland's predecessor, Masque, but this writer ain't one of 'em. Masque features co-writing credits from the Wonder Stuff's Miles Hunt, as well as the Waterboys' Anthony Thistlethwaite; it's the least pretentious and most stylistically-varied album of the band's career. Plus, it features a fair amount of fiddle, which is rarely a bad thing."

== Track listing ==
Except where noted, music by Adams, Brown, Hussey
All words by Hussey

1. "Never Again" – 5:05
2. "Shades of Green, Pt. 2" – 3:59
3. "Even You May Shine" (Adams, Brown, Hussey, Thistlethwaite) – 4:41
4. "Trail of Scarlet" – 3:43
5. "Spider and the Fly" – 4:49
6. "She Conjures Me Wings" (Adams, Brown, Hussey, Thistlethwaite) – 2:48
7. "Sticks and Stones" – 4:45
8. "Like a Child Again" – 3:38
9. "Who Will Love Me Tomorrow?" (Miles Hunt, Hussey) – 4:09
10. "You Make Me Breathe" – 4:36
11. "From One Jesus to Another" – 3:50
12. "Until There's Another Sunrise" – 5:33

2008 bonus tracks

13. "Beautiful Chaos" – 5:04
14. "All Tangled Up In You" – 6:27
15. "Atomic" (Debbie Harry, Jimmy Destri) – 5:13
16. "You Make Me Breathe (The Barn Mix)" – 7:18

== Personnel ==
The Mission

- Craig Adams – bass guitar
- Mick Brown – drums
- Wayne Hussey – vocals & guitar

Additional musicians (from liner notes)

- Mark Saunders
- Joe Gibb
- Anto Thistlethwaite
- Martin Alcock
- Adam Birch
- Kelly Hussey
- Bev Perrin
- Penny Thompson
- B.J. De Haan
- Ric Saunders
- Arabic orchestration on "Sticks and Stones" scored, arranged and conducted by Jaz Coleman, performed by Aboud Abdel Ali

== Charts ==
Chart (1992)	Peak position
Austrian Albums (Ö3 Austria)	40
Dutch Albums (Album Top 100)	73
German Albums (Offizielle Top 100)	49
Swedish Albums (Sverigetopplistan)	38
Swiss Albums (Schweizer Hitparade)	40
UK Albums (Official Charts)	23
