= Atomic Heart (disambiguation) =

Atomic Heart is a 2023 first-person shooter action role-playing video game.

Atomic Heart may also refer to:

- Atomic Heart (album), a 1994 album by Mr. Children
- "Atomic Heart", a 2014 single by The Mission; see The Mission discography
- Atom Heart Mother (film), a 2013 Iranian film also released as "Atomic Heart"
