= "No Snow, No Show" for the Eskimo =

1993 live album by The Mission

Live album by The Mission
- Released: 1993
- Recorded: 1988 / 1990
- Genre: Gothic rock
- Length: 61:11
- Label: Windsong; WINCD 035
- Producer: Mark Radcliffe / Pete Dauncey

The Mission chronology
Masque (1992)	"No Snow, No Show" for the Eskimo (1993)	Sum and Substance (1994)

"No Snow, No Show" for the Eskimo is a live album by The Mission released in 1993. It was recorded at two shows (at Wembley Arena on 2 December 1988 and at Manchester Apollo on 15 March 1990) for the BBC and was broadcast live by BBC Radio One. These recordings were compiled by Wayne Hussey and Joe Gibb. In 2008 all tracks, except for numbers 6, 8 and 9, and more from both concerts, were released as part of the Live at the BBC boxset.

The Eskimo in the title refers to an early name for the die-hard Mission fans who would follow them around the world on tour. One member, Ramone, reported that when he was frisked by the border patrol in a European country, the guard shook his head at him and uttered something in his native language, which to Ramone sounded like Eskimo.

== Track listing ==
1. "Amelia" – 2:57**
2. "Wasteland" – 6:20**
3. "Serpent's Kiss" – 4:07*
4. "Belief" – 7:36*
5. "Severina" – 3:50*
6. "Butterfly on a Wheel" – 5:47**
7. "Into the Blue" – 4:28**
8. "Kingdom Come (Forever & Again)" – 4:56*
9. "Deliverance" – 6:21*
10. "Tower of Strength" – 8:21*
11. "Crystal Ocean" – 6:27*

== Personnel ==
The Mission

- Wayne Hussey - vocals, guitar, piano
- Craig Adams - bass
- Simon Hinkler - guitars
- Mick Brown - drums
- David Wolfenden - guitars (Manchester Apollo only)
