= Children (The Mission album) =

1988 studio album by The Mission

Studio album by the Mission
- Released: 29 February 1988
- Recorded: September–December 1987
- Studio: The Manor Studio (Oxfordshire, England)
- Genre: Gothic rock
- Length: 57:48
- Label: Mercury
- Producer: John Paul Jones

The Mission chronology
The First Chapter (1987)	Children (1988)	Carved in Sand (1990)

The Mission studio album chronology
God's Own Medicine (1986)	Children (1988)	Carved in Sand (1990)

Singles from Children
- 1. "Tower of Strength" Released: February 1988; 2. "Beyond the Pale" Released: April 1988

Professional ratings
Review scores
Source	Rating
AllMusic	4/5 stars
Classic Rock	7/10
Encyclopedia of Popular Music	3/5 stars
The Great Rock Discography	6/10
MusicHound	3/5
NME	3/10
Record Collector	3/5 stars
Record Mirror	5/5
Smash Hits	8/10

Children is the second studio album by the English gothic rock band the Mission, released on 29 February 1988 by Mercury Records. Two singles were released from the album, "Tower of Strength" and "Beyond the Pale". A third single, "Kingdom Come", was scheduled but appeared only as a promotional single. The album peaked at number 2 on the UK Charts

Singer Julianne Regan of the rock band All About Eve provided additional vocals on two tracks – "Beyond the Pale" and "Black Mountain Mist".

Children was re-issued in 2007 with four bonus tracks.

== Track listing ==
Except where noted: all music by Adams, Brown, Hinkler and Hussey; and words by Hussey.

=== 1988 release ===
1. "Beyond the Pale" – 7:49
2. "Wing and a Prayer" – 3:41
3. "Fabienne" – 3:41
4. "Heaven on Earth" – 5:19
5. "Tower of Strength" – 8:03
6. "Kingdom Come" – 4:50
7. "Breathe" – 1:26
8. "Child's Play" – 3:39
9. "Shamera Kye" (J. S. Webb) – 0:34
10. "Black Mountain Mist" – 2:54
11. "Dream On" (Steven Tyler) – 3:54
12. "Heat" – 5:14
13. "Hymn (for America)" – 6:35

=== 1988 vinyl release ===
Side A

1. "Beyond the Pale" – 7:49
2. "Wing and a Prayer" – 3:41
3. "Heaven on Earth" – 5:19
4. "Tower of Strength" – 8:03

Side B

1. "Kingdom Come" – 4:50
2. "Breathe" – 1:26
3. "Child's Play" – 3:39
4. "Shamera Kye" (J. S. Webb) – 0:34
5. "Black Mountain Mist" – 2:54
6. "Heat" – 5:14
7. "Hymn (for America)" – 6:35

"Fabienne" and "Dream On" appeared only on the CD and MC releases.

=== 2007 re-issue ===
1. "Beyond the Pale" – 7:49
2. "Wing and a Prayer" – 3:41
3. "Fabienne" – 3:41
4. "Heaven on Earth" – 5:19
5. "Tower of Strength" – 8:03
6. "Kingdom Come" – 4:50
7. "Breathe" – 1:26
8. "Child's Play" – 3:39
9. "Shamera Kye" (J. S. Webb) – 0:34
10. "Black Mountain Mist" – 2:54
11. "Dream On" (Steven Tyler)– 3:54
12. "Heat" – 5:14
13. "Hymn (for America)" – 6:35

Bonus tracks

14. "Tadeusz (1912-1988)" – 4:57
15. "Child's Play (Live)" – 3:46
16. "Kingdom Come (Heavenly Mix)" – 8:09
17. "Heat (Tim Palmer Version)" – 4:06

Produced by John Paul Jones
Engineered by Mark 'Spike' Stent

== Personnel ==
The Mission

- Wayne Hussey – guitars; vocals
- Simon Hinkler – guitars; keyboards
- Craig Adams – bass
- Mick Brown – drums

Additional musicians

- John Paul Jones – keyboards; programming
- Julianne Regan – additional voice on "Beyond the Pale" and "Black Mountain Mist"
- Jez Webb – harmonica on "Shamera Kye"
- Michael Ade – violin on "Shamera Kye"
- Skaila Kanga – Celtic harp on "Black Mountain Mist"
- Woodstock Infant School – additional voices on "Heat" and "Hymn (for America)"

== Charts ==
Chart (1988)	Peak position
Dutch Albums (Album Top 100)	29
German Albums (Offizielle Top 100)	33
Swedish Albums (Sverigetopplistan)	20
UK Albums (OCC)	2
US Billboard 200	126

== Certifications ==
Region	Certification	Certified units/sales
United Kingdom (BPI)	Gold	100,000^{^}
^{^} Shipments figures based on certification alone.
