= Richard Vernon (musician) =

British musician and songwriter

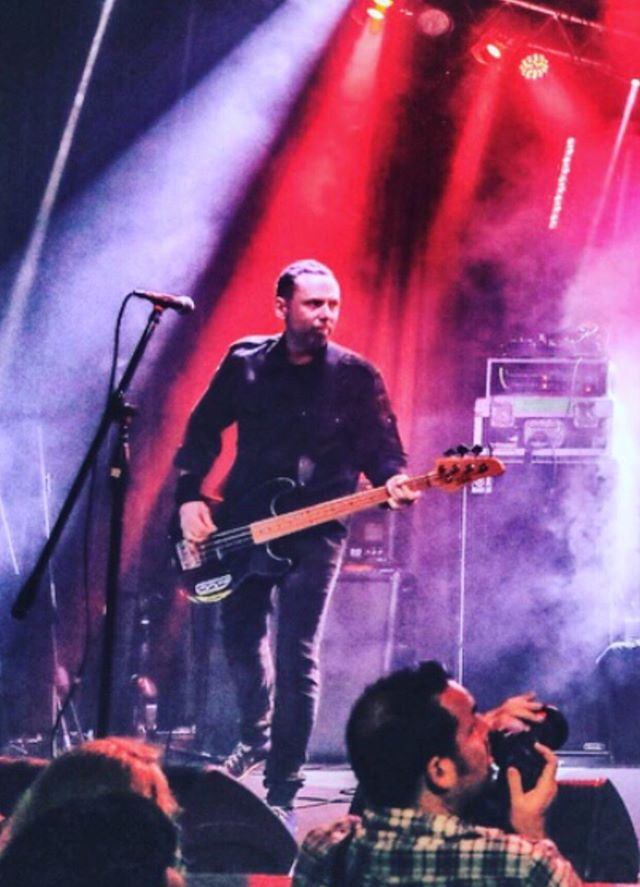
- Vernon performing in Los Angeles, 2018

Background information
- Born: 7 July 1966 (age 59); Chichester, England
- Occupation: Bassist
- Member of: Manbird; Ricky Warwick & the Fighting Hearts
- Formerly of: The One; The Mission; MGT; The Last Decade
- Spouse: Noriko Vernon

Richard "Rich" Vernon (born 7 July 1966) is a British musician and songwriter best known as the bass guitarist of rock band The Mission, and previously with The Only Ones vocalist and cult artist Peter Perrett in The One. He has recorded two studio and four live albums with The Mission including the critically acclaimed God Is a Bullet, as well as two with The One and one with Helter Skelter. He also appeared as a guest musician on The Dead Guitars album Flags, in 2008. In 2024, Vernon formed Manbird with two ex-bandmates, Paul Smith and Steve Hands.

== Early life ==
Richard Vernon was born in Chichester, England, and relocated with his family to London until the age of two, when his family returned to their native Wales. His first musical instrument was a six-string guitar, followed by a brief dalliance with the drums, and finally bass guitar.

== Early career ==
At the age of 20, Vernon left his home in Wales and moved to London, starting his musical career as a session player in a number of bands including Eddie and the Hot Rods. Over his career, he has played with musicians from The Kinks, Squeeze, The Adventures, The Charlatans, The Waterboys, The Monochrome Set, The Pink Fairies, The Wonder Stuff, The Pretenders, The Damned and many others. A change of pace saw him playing for UK agitpop band A Popular History of Signs on various European tours. Soon thereafter he co-founded Rough Trade and Island Records act Helter Skelter. They recorded a critically acclaimed album and garnered a single of the week award from Melody Maker. They toured Europe to support the album and recorded two BBC Radio 1 sessions, but a combination of limited success and struggles after PolyGram took over of Island Records saw them split shortly after.

== The One ==
Vernon then joined Peter Perrett's group The One. The band made two studio albums and one live album as well as extensively touring around the UK, France, Spain, Germany, Holland, Belgium and Japan. Their critically acclaimed Woke Up Sticky album received enthusiastic reviews from The Guardian and Daily Telegraph. With equally good reviews for their live shows, the band promised much but after a busy and productive five-year period they drifted apart. Perrett's biographer, Nina Antonia in her book Homme Fatale, puts this down to Perrett's increasingly erratic behaviour, whilst other band members have been quoted that the band had just run its course.

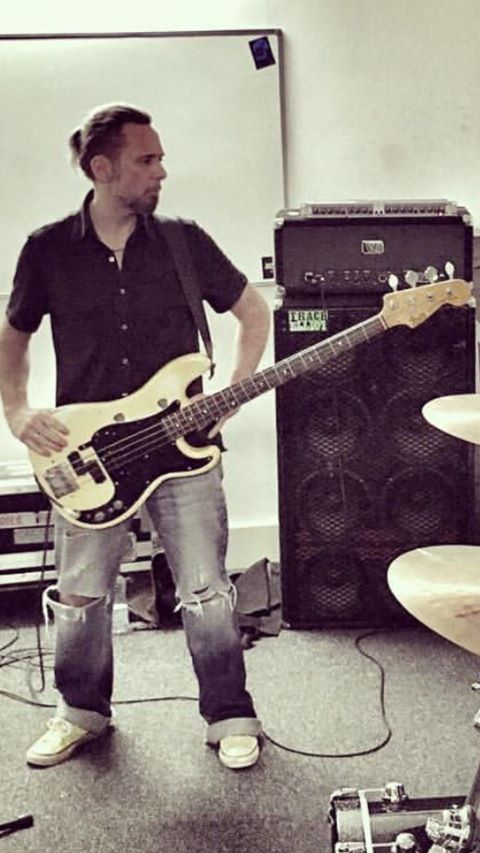
Vernon in rehearsals with Ricky Warwick

== The Mission ==
Following a call from Perrett's tour manager, Vernon was asked to join The Mission as replacement for departing founder member Craig Adams. During his tenure with the band, Vernon recorded two studio albums (God Is a Bullet and Dum Dum Bullet). God is a Bullet charted in the UK Top 30 Independent Label Album Chart and UK Top 40 Rock Album Chart. The first single, "Keep it in the Family", charted at number 7 in the BBC 1 Rock Chart. The band also recorded a live album from London's Shepherd's Bush Empire over four consecutive sold out nights, which was billed as the last Mission shows for the foreseeable future. Vernon also recorded two live DVDs with the band as well as touring all over the UK, Europe, America, Canada and South Africa. He also contributed towards the Mission biography, At War with the Gods, published in 2015.

== Post-Mission ==
After leaving The Mission, Vernon decided to spend more time co-writing music and record production, and to focus on his family. He still found time to play live shows, including some with UK band The Sentimentalists, including an appearance at the Glastonbury Festival in 2015.

In November 2016, Vernon replaced Robbie Crane in Ricky Warwick's band The Fighting Hearts for a UK tour, supported by Vice Squad.

Vernon joined MGT on tour for a March 2018 US tour to promote their album "Gemini Nyte". The band included ex-Mission UK mate, Mark Gemini Thwaite, along with Ashton Nyte and Jared Shavelson; their performances met an extremely positive response.

In March 2022, Vernon continued his role with Ricky Warwick & The Fighting Hearts for a month-long tour of the UK and Ireland, alongside Warwick, guitarist Ben Christo (The Sisters of Mercy) and drummer Jack Taylor (Tax the Heat). Further shows followed in May, with Sam Wood (Wayward Sons) standing in for Christo, and in August, two shows in Dublin and Belfast supporting Stiff Little Fingers. Vernon again performed with the Fighting Hearts in 2023, and further tours and festivals are planned for 2024 and 2025.

In June 2024, Vernon played bass for German goth band The Last Decade at their debut show at the Mystic Festival in Poland, alongside Tim Vic (Nosferatu) and Michelle Darkness (End of Green).

== Manbird ==
In 2024, Vernon joined forces with Paul Smith (The Doctor's Children, Helter Skelter), and drummer/multi-instrumentalist Steve Hands (The Band of Holy Joy, Peter Perrett, The Only Ones) to form a new band, Manbird. A video for a new track, "Bowie's in Newcastle" was released in June, a second single, "Busy Giddy Minds", was released on July 31, followed by a third, "All the Way from Blackpool" on 23 September.

== Equipment ==
Vernon plays bass guitar, guitar and occasionally, drums. Key to his signature bass sound is the use of vintage Fender basses and Trace Elliot backline.

== Personal life ==
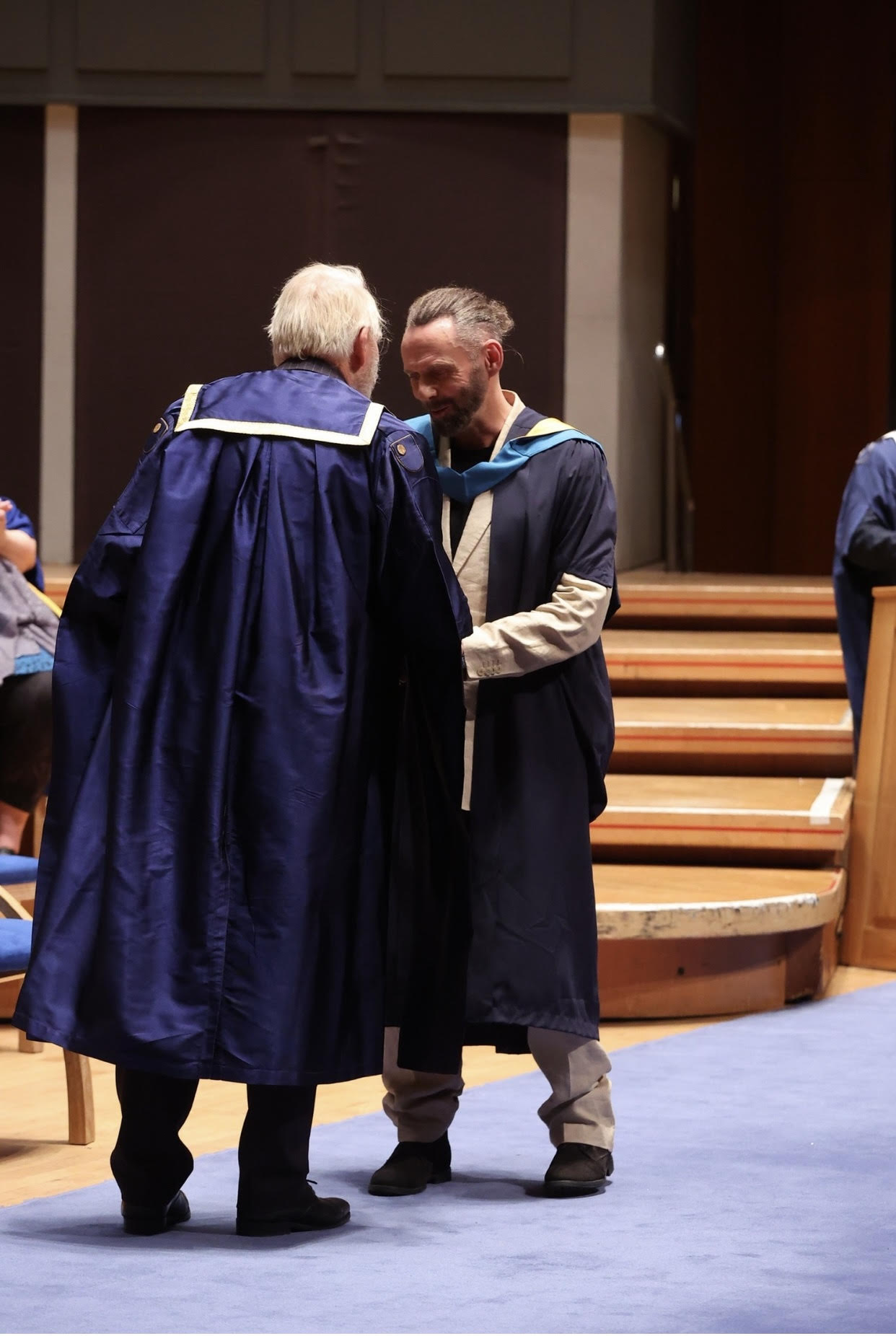
Vernon at his graduation ceremony in November 2023

He lives in a converted chapel in North Wales with his Japanese wife, their two children, Cai and Gwynfor, and his father. More recently, he has been heavily involved with politics, aiming to keep the U.K. in the European Union via his campaigning work with Wales for Europe. He gained a 1st class honours degree (BSc) in Psychology from the Open University in November 2023.

Vernon's son Gwynfor is also a musician, forming Deadbeat Mech in 2023.

== Recorded works ==
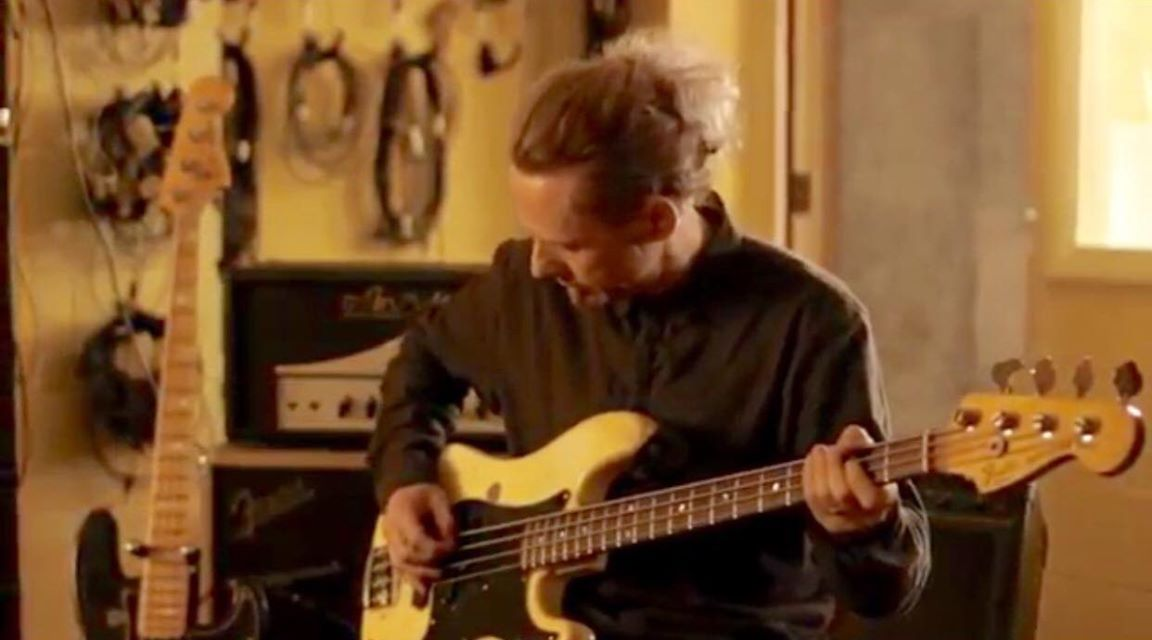
Richard Vernon in the studio

The following represent the body of recorded works that Vernon has been involved with:

Date	Band	Title	Format	Label
1989	Helter Skelter	"Last Train"	7"/12" Single	Rough Trade Records
1990	Helter Skelter	"Consume"	7"/12" Single	Island Records
1990	Helter Skelter	"Sense"	7" Single	Island Records
1990	Helter Skelter	Consume	Album	Island Records
1990	Helter Skelter	"Angel"	7"/12" Single	Island Records
1994	The One (Peter Perrett)	Cultered Palate	EP	Dwarf Records
1996	The One (Peter Perrett)	"Woke Up Sticky"	Single	Demon Records
1996	The One (Peter Perrett)	Woke Up Sticky	Album	Demon Records
2000	The One (Peter Perrett)	Hearts on Fire	Album	NMC Music
2005	The Mission	Lighting the Candles	DVD	Oblivion
2007	The Mission	"Keep It in the Family"	Single	SPV / Eyes Wide Shut Recordings
2007	The Mission	God Is a Bullet	Album	SPV / Eyes Wide Shut Recordings
2007	The Mission	Blush	EP	SPV / Eyes Wide Shut Recordings
2008	The Mission	Dum Dum Bullet	Album	SPV / Eyes Wide Shut Recordings
2008	The Mission	The First Chapter: Live at London Shepherd's Bush Empire	Album	Let Them Eat Vinyl / Eyes Wide Shut Recordings
2008	The Mission	God's Own Medicine: Live at London Shepherd's Bush Empire	Album	Let Them Eat Vinyl / Eyes Wide Shut Recordings
2008	The Mission	Children: Live at London Shepherd's Bush Empire	Album	Let Them Eat Vinyl / Eyes Wide Shut Recordings
2008	The Mission	Carved in Sand: Live at London Shepherd's Bush Empire	Album	Let Them Eat Vinyl / Eyes Wide Shut Recordings
2008	Dead Guitars	"Blue" (track from the album, Flags)	Album track	Echozone
2009	The Mission	The Final Chapter	DVD	Oblivion
2018	The Mission	For Ever More - Live at London, Shepherd's Bush Empire	CD Box Set	Cherry Red Records
