= Sum and Substance =

1994 compilation album by The Mission

Greatest hits album by The Mission
- Released: 7 February 1994
- Recorded: 1986–1993
- Genre: Gothic rock, rock
- Length: 75:00
- Label: Vertigo/Phonogram Records
- Producer: Wayne Hussey, Tim Palmer, John Paul Jones, Mark Saunders and Andy Partridge.

The Mission chronology
No Snow, No Show for the Eskimo (1993)	Sum and Substance (1994)	Salad Daze (1994)

Professional ratings
Review scores
Source	Rating
AllMusic	4.5/5 stars
Music Week	4/5 stars
Select	3/5 stars

Sum and Substance is a compilation album released by the British rock band The Mission on 7 February 1994 through Vertigo/Phonogram Records. It contains all the singles released by the band as well as two new songs. The vinyl version on two LP's had a slightly different track-listing. A remix of "Tower of Strength" by Youth preceded the release, although it was not included on the compilation. A second single "Afterglow" appeared in March of the same year, but failed to chart. A VHS with all the music videos produced by the band bears the same title. The band did a short tour around the UK in support of the release.

== Track listing ==
No.	Title	Album	Length
1.	"Wasteland"	Gods Own Medicine	5:38
2.	"Severina"	Gods Own Medicine	4:03
3.	"Stay With Me"	Gods Own Medicine	4:37
4.	"Tower of Strength"	Children	8:08
5.	"Beyond the Pale (Armageddon Mix)"	Children	8:48
6.	"Butterfly on a Wheel"	Carved in Sand	5:38
7.	"Deliverance"	Carved in Sand	6:00
8.	"Into The Blue"	Carved in Sand	4:09
9.	"Amelia"	Carved in Sand	2:53
10.	"Hands Across the Ocean"	Grains of Sand	3:47
11.	"Never Again"	Masque	5:06
12.	"Shades of Green (pt. ii)"	Masque	3:59
13.	"Like a Child Again (remix)"	Masque	3:38
14.	"Sour Puss"	previously unreleased	3:32
15.	"Afterglow"	previously unreleased	4:05

== Charts ==
Chart (1994)	Peak position
Swiss Albums (Schweizer Hitparade)	43
UK Albums (OCC)	49
