= Grains of Sand (album) =

1990 compilation album by the Mission

Compilation album by The Mission
- Released: 22 October 1990
- Recorded: May–August 1989
- Genre: Alternative rock
- Length: 48:13
- Label: Mercury

The Mission chronology
Carved in Sand (1990)	Grains of Sand (1990)	Masque (1992)

Singles from Grains of Sand
- 1. "Hands Across the Ocean" Released: 5 November 1990

Professional ratings
Review scores
Source	Rating
Allmusic	4.5/5 stars

Grains of Sand is a compilation album by gothic rock band The Mission, released in October 1990. A number of the tracks were originally recorded for their previous album, Carved in Sand, but not included on that release. Also included are acoustic versions of previously released songs and the Andy Partridge co-produced single 'Hands Across the Ocean'.

The album was expanded with the Metal Guru's material and included in the two disc reissue of Carved in Sand, released in 2008.

== Track listing ==
Except where noted, all music by Adams, Brown, Hinkler, Hussey and words by Hussey

1. "Hands Across the Ocean" – 3:49
2. "The Grip of Disease" – 4:12
3. "Divided We Fall" – 3:40
4. "Mercenary" (M. Brown, W. Hussey) – 2:50
5. "Mr. Pleasant" (Ray Davies) – 2:50
6. "Kingdom Come (Forever and Again)" – 4:57
7. "Heaven Sends You" – 4:54
8. "Sweet Smile of a Mystery" – 3:55
9. "Tower of Strength (Casbah Mix)" – 4:30
10. "Butterfly on a Wheel (Troubadour Mix)" – 4:29
11. "Love" (John Lennon) – 1:51
12. "Bird of Passage" – 6:28

== Personnel ==
The Mission

- Craig Adams – bass guitar
- Mick Brown – drums
- Simon Hinkler – guitar, keyboards
- Wayne Hussey – vocals, guitar

Produced by

- Andy Partridge with additional production and remix by Wayne Hussey (1)
- Tim Palmer (2, 3, 8)
- Wayne Hussey (4, 9, 10, 11)
- Tim Palmer & Chris Sheldon (5)
- Julian Mendelsohn & The Mission (6)
- Wayne Hussey & Chris Sheldon (7, 12)

== Charts ==
Chart (1990)	Peak position
German Albums (Offizielle Top 100)	61
UK Albums (Official Charts)	28
