= Aura (The Mission album) =

2001 studio album by The Mission

Studio album by The Mission
- Released: November 2001
- Recorded: 2000
- Genre: Gothic rock
- Length: 67:56
- Label: Playground Recordings; PGNDCD 002
- Producer: Wayne Hussey

The Mission chronology
Ever After (2000)	Aura (2001)	God Is a Bullet (2007)

U.S. cover
- U.S. cover stating "The Mission UK" as the name of the band

Professional ratings
Review scores
Source	Rating
Allmusic	4/5 stars

Aura is the seventh studio album by The Mission. Released in 2001, it was their first studio album since Blue in 1996. The album was also released as a slipcased limited edition 2-CD set. The bonus disc features the original version of "In Denial", two videos - "Evangeline" and "Deliverance" (live), interview footage and a weblink. The album was re-released in November 2014 together with its accompanying Aural Delight.

== Background ==
After reforming the band in 1999, Wayne Hussey and Craig Adams together with former Mission guitarist Mark Gemini Thwaite and The Cult drummer Scott Garrett toured the US and Europe playing largely old material. A second tour, Recon2000 was more extensive and saw the introduction of new material. Hussey had been in contact with Charlie Eyre, the band's former Phonogram A&R man, with a view to set up a label, Playground Records. After rehearsals during sound-checks and time spent doing preliminary recording in Brighton in December 2000. Dave M. Allen produced the record that was partly recorded in Bath and in LA while Steve Power mixed some of the tracks. Two singles were released in support of the album "Evangeline" and "Shine Like the Stars". Some of the B-sides and additional material was released as Aural Delight in 2002.

== Track listing ==
1. "Evangeline" - 3:57
2. "Shine Like the Stars" - 4:35
3. "(Slave to) Lust" - 5:39
4. "Mesmerised" - 5:20
5. "Lay Your Hands on Me" - 5:33
6. "Dragonfly" - 5:43
7. "Happy" - 3:05
8. "To Die by Your Hand" - 1:18
9. "Trophy/It Never Rains..." - 5:45
10. "The Light That Pours from You" - 5:28
11. "Burlesque" - 4:57
12. "Cocoon" - 7:34
13. "In Denial" - 9:04
- Following 'In Denial', there is a hidden track – 'Frozen'.

== Personnel ==
- Wayne Hussey – vocals, guitar, keyboards
- Craig Adams – bass
- Mark Gemini Thwaite – guitars
- Scott Garrett – drums

== Charts ==
Chart (2001)	Peak position
German Albums (Offizielle Top 100)	89
