= Tower of Strength (The Mission song) =

1988 single by the Mission

Single by the Mission

from the album Children
- B-side: "Fabienne"
- Released: February 1988
- Recorded: 1987
- Studio: The Manor Studios (Oxfordshire, England)
- Genre: Gothic rock
- Length: 8:03
- Label: Mercury; Phonogram
- Songwriters: Craig Adams; Mick Brown; Simon Hinkler; Wayne Hussey
- Producer: John Paul Jones

The Mission singles chronology
""Severina"" (1987)	"Tower of Strength" (1988)	""Beyond the Pale"" (1988)

"Tower of Strength" is a song released by the English gothic rock band the Mission in February 1988. It was the first of two singles to be released from their second studio album Children. It peaked at No. 12 on the UK charts on its original release, but has seen re-recorded releases in 1994 and 2020 separately.

== Background ==
Tower of Strength was recorded in 1987 at The Manor Studio, near Kidlington in Oxfordshire. The track was part of the sessions recorded with John Paul Jones from Led Zeppelin on production duties. The track was initially written about The Eskimos, devoted fans and followers of The Mission who gave them strength in the early days of the band's career. Wayne Hussey, singer and songwriter from the band, noted that the drummer, Mick Brown, and John Paul Jones, spent more than two days programming the sequencer for the track. After the song entered the UK charts on 13 February 1988, the track got to No. 12 on the UK chart and stayed in the chart for seven weeks. It also reached No. 30 in the Netherlands.

The song was remixed and re-released in 1994 to promote the compilation album Sum and Substance. It was also re-recorded under the name ReMission International with various artists in aid of raising funds for charities and health workers during the Covid-19 pandemic.

== Critical reception ==
Duncan Harris, writing in The Rough Guide to Rock, described the track as having a "..windswept melody and passion." Ted Mico reviewing the album Children in Melody Maker, noted that John Paul Jones (ex-Led Zeppelin) had produced the album and drew comparisons by stating that "Tower of Strength" was "a sketchy facsimile of 'Kashmir'.

Barbara Ellen of NME described the song as "as pompous and facile as everything else The Mission have produced since having their fingers prised away from Eldritch's infinitely more stylish skirts."

== Track listings ==
=== 1988 original release ===
- 7" single (MYTH4)

A. "Tower of Strength"
B1. "Fabienne"
B2. "Breathe (Vocal)"

- 12" (MYTHX4)

A. "Tower of Strength"
B1. "Fabienne"
B2. "Breathe (Instrumental)"
B3. "Dream On"

- 12" (MYTHX422)

A. "Tower of Strength (Bombay Mix)"
B1. "Fabienne"
B2. "Breathe (Vocal)"

- CD (MTHCD4)

A. "Tower of Strength (extended version)"
B1. "Breathe (Vocal)"
B2. "Fabienne"
B3. "Dream On"

- VCD

A. "Tower of Strength (7" mix)"
B1. "Forever More"
B2. "Tadeusz"
B3. "Dream On"
B4. "Tower of Strength" (video)

=== 1994 release ===
- CD (MYTCD15)

A. "Tower of Strength (East India Trans Cairo Mix Edit)"
B1. "Tower of Strength (East India Trans Cairo Mix)"
B2. "Deliverance (Sorcerer's Mix)"

- CD (MYTCX15)

A. "Tower of Strength (Tribal Mantra Mix)"
B1. "Tower of Strength (Bombay Mix)"
B2. "Tower of Strength (Lysergic Dub)"
B3. "Tower of Strength (Zen Acoustic Mix)"

=== 2020 release ===
This single was re-recorded with several new vocalists in aid of the worldwide effort in combatting Coronavirus. Among those contributing to the track were; Gary Numan, Martin Gore, Midge Ure, Billy Duffy, Rachel Goswell, Andy Rourke, Julianne Regan, Kirk Brandon, Lol Tolhurst, and Miles Hunt. The project was labelled as ReMission International and the track was called "TOS2020".

== Chart performance ==
Chart (1988)	Peak position
Netherlands (Dutch Top 40)	30
Netherlands (Single Top 100)	60
UK Singles (OCC)	12

== Personnel ==
- Craig Adams – bass guitar
- Mick Brown – drums
- Simon Hinkler – guitar, keyboards
- Wayne Hussey – vocals, guitar
