= The First Chapter (The Mission album) =

1987 compilation album by The Mission

Compilation album by The Mission
- Released: 22 June 1987
- Recorded: September – October 1985
- Studio: The Slaughterhouse Studios, Driffield
- Genre: Gothic rock
- Length: 44:47
- Label: Mercury

The Mission chronology
God's Own Medicine (1986)	The First Chapter (1987)	Children (1988)

American Cover

Professional ratings
Review scores
Source	Rating
Allmusic	link
Record Mirror	4/5 stars

The First Chapter is a compilation album by gothic rock band The Mission. It gathered the material released on the first two EPs released through the Chapter 22 label. Titled I (featuring "Serpents Kiss") and II (featuring the double A-side "Like a Hurricane" and "Garden of Delight") the album was released on Mercury Records in June 1987. It includes all the songs from the first EP in its entirety, but omits the original versions of "The Crystal Ocean" (from the 12") and "Garden of Delight" (from the 7" and limited edition 12") from the second. The US release was augmented with the B-sides of the V (Severina) EP. The tracks that were originally left off this compilation were included on the expanded and remastered edition. This restored (and repositioned) both the short intermissions and 'swan song' from the II EP.

Christ True of allmusic.com called the album 'an interesting piece of history of an oft-forgotten era of English rock'.

== Track listing ==
Except where noted, all music by Adams, Brown, Hinkler, Hussey and words by Hussey

=== UK release ===
1. "Like a Hurricane" (Neil Young) – 4:55
2. "Over the Hills and Far Away" – 3:56
3. "Naked and Savage" – 4:46
4. "Serpents Kiss" – 4:15
5. "Dancing Barefoot" (Patti Smith, Ivan Kral) – 3:05
6. "The Crystal Ocean" (extended version) – 7:35
7. "Garden of Delight" (extended version) – 5:00
8. "Wake (RSV)" – 5:00
9. "Like a Hurricane" (extended) (Neil Young) – 7:05

=== US release ===
The US version drops "Like a Hurricane" (extended) and adds "Tomorrow Never Knows" (edited version) and "Wishing Well" from the band's 5th single "Severina", the latter from its 12" version.

1. "Tomorrow Never Knows" (edited version) (John Lennon, Paul McCartney) – 3:30
2. "Over the Hills and Far Away" – 3:56
3. "Naked and Savage" – 4:46
4. "Serpents Kiss" – 4:15
5. "Wake (RSV)" – 5:00
6. "Like a Hurricane" (Neil Young) – 4:55
7. "Garden of Delight" (extended version) – 5:00
8. "Wishing Well" (Paul Rodgers, Simon Kirke, Paul Kossoff, John Bundrick, Tetsu Yamauchi) – 2:45
9. "Dancing Barefoot" (Patti Smith, Ivan Kral) – 3:05
10. "The Crystal Ocean" (extended) – 7:35

=== Other releases ===
The Japanese version also includes the tracks "Serpents Kiss" (live) from the band's 4th single "Wasteland" and "Tomorrow Never Knows" (Amphetamix) from the band's 5th single "Severina".

=== Reissued version ===
In June 2007, Universal Music re-released the UK edition of The First Chapter with 9 bonus tracks

1. "Like a Hurricane" (Neil Young) – 4:51
2. [+] "Intermission: Gleaming Dome" [incidental] – 0:38
3. "Over the Hills and Far Away" – 3:56
4. [+] "Intermission: Easy Coast Lament" [incidental] – 0:39
5. "Naked and Savage" – 4:45
6. "Serpents Kiss" – 4:11
7. "Dancing Barefoot" (Patti Smith, Ivan Kral) – 3:08
8. "The Crystal Ocean (extended)" – 7:33
9. [+] "Swan Song: Vigilante Man" [incidental] – 0:24
10. "Garden of Delight" (extended) – 5:01
11. "Wake (RSV)" – 5:01
12. "Like a Hurricane" (extended) – 7:07
13. [+] "Bridges Burning" (Slaughterhouse Version) – 3:59
14. [+] "Serpents Kiss" (Live '86) – 4:11
15. [+] "Wake" (Live '86) – 4:56
16. [+] "Dancing Barefoot" (Live '86) – 2:06
17. [+] "1969" (Live '86) (Dave Alexander, Ron Asheton, Scott Asheton, Iggy Pop) – 2:43
18. [+] "Shelter from the Storm" (Live, Astoria '88) – 9:26

== Personnel ==
- Craig Adams – bass guitar
- Mick Brown – drums
- Simon Hinkler – guitar
- Wayne Hussey – vocals & guitar

== Charts ==
Chart (1987)	Peak position
UK Albums (OCC)	35
