= God Is a Bullet (album) =

2007 studio album by The Mission

Studio album by The Mission
- Released: April 2007
- Recorded: September – November 2006, NAM Studios, Wiltshire, Ghostroom Studios (strings) and the Green Room, Brazil.
- Genre: Gothic rock
- Length: 67:46
- Label: Cooking Vinyl
- Producer: Wayne Hussey

The Mission chronology
Aura (2001)	God Is a Bullet (2007)	The Brightest Light (2013)

U.S. cover
- U.S. cover stating "The Mission UK" as the name of the band

God Is a Bullet is the eighth studio album by The Mission. It was released at the end of April 2007 by SPV Records in Germany and Cooking Vinyl in the UK. The album features guest appearances by Julianne Regan, Tim Bricheno and Simon Hinkler. It was preceded by the single "Keep It in the Family" which was followed by "Blush". "Running with Scissors" reuses the music Wayne Hussey composed for Atsushi Sakurai's 2004 song "Sacrifice".

== Track listing ==
No.	Title	Written by	Length
1.	"Still Deep Waters"	Wayne Hussey	3:10
2.	"Keep It in the Family"	Hussey	3:59
3.	"Belladonna"	Words: Hussey; Music: Thwaite	3:34
4.	"To Love & The Kill with the Very Same Hand"	Words: Hussey; Music: Hussey, Thwaite, Vernon	4:27
5.	"Aquarius & Gemini"	Hussey	3:42
6.	"Blush"	Hussey	3:47
7.	"Chinese Burn"	Hussey	4:59
8.	"Father"	Hussey	5:55
9.	"Hdshrinkerea"	Words: Hussey; Music: Hussey, Thwaite	4:28
10.	"Draped in Red"	Hussey	4:55
11.	"Running with Scissors"	Hussey	4:27
12.	"In Silhouette"	Hussey	4:05
13.	"Dumb"	Words: Hussey; Music: Hussey, Thwaite	4:49
14.	"Absolution"	Hussey	4:46
15.	"Grotesque"	Hussey	6:34

US Bonus Tracks
No.	Title	Length
1.	"Weather Man"	3:54
2.	"Chelsea Blue"	4:45
3.	"Thine"	3:12

== Personnel ==
- Wayne Hussey – lead vocals, guitars, piano
- Mark Gemini Thwaite – guitar
- Rich Vernon – bass
- Steve Spring – drums and percussion
- Julianne Regan – backing vocals on "Still Deep Waters" and "Aquarius & Gemini"
- Tim Bricheno – guitar on "Running with Scissors", "Absolution" and "Blush"
- Simon Hinkler – guitar on "Grotesque"
- Caroline Dale – cello and strings arrangement on "Draped in Red", "Aquarius & Gemini", "Dumb" and "Grotesque"
- Cathy Thompson – violin on "Draped in Red", "Aquarius & Gemini", "Dumb" and "Grotesque"

Technical personnel

- Wayne Hussey – engineering, mixing and production
- Greg Freeman – engineer and mixing
- Andy Baldwin – mastering
- John Reynolds – engineer (strings)

Design

- Cinthya Hussey – design/photography

== Charts ==
Chart (2007)	Peak position
UK Independent Albums (OCC)	14
UK Rock & Metal Albums (OCC)	14
