= Another Fall from Grace =

2016 studio album by The Mission

Studio album by The Mission
- Released: 30 September 2016
- Genres: Gothic rock, alternative rock
- Length: 1:04:14
- Label: Eyes Wide Shut
- Producer: Tim Palmer

The Mission chronology
The Brightest Light (2013)	Another Fall from Grace (2016)

Professional ratings
Review scores
Source	Rating
Smells Like Infinite Sadness	5/5 stars
Pure Rawk	4/5 stars

Another Fall from Grace is the tenth studio album by The Mission released on 30 September 2016. Wayne Hussey has described the album as a lost link between The Sisters of Mercy's First and Last and Always album and The Mission's own first album, God's Own Medicine. He attributes this in part to his use of the 12-string guitar which he fell out of favour with after God's Own Medicine was released.

== Track listing ==
All songs were written by Wayne Hussey, except tracks 1,5,9 written by Simon Hinkler and Wayne Hussey

1. "Another Fall from Grace"
2. "Met-Amor-Phosis"
3. "Within the Deepest Darkness (Fearful)"
4. "Blood on the Road"
5. "Can't See the Ocean for the Rain"
6. "Tyranny of Secrets"
7. "Never's Longer Than Forever"
8. "Bullets & Bayonets"
9. "Valaam"
10. "Jade"
11. "Only You & You Alone"
12. "Phantom Pain"

== Personnel ==
=== The Mission ===
- Wayne Hussey – guitars, vocals
- Simon Hinkler – guitars, keyboards
- Craig Adams – bass
- Mike Kelly – drums

=== Additional personnel ===
- Wayne Hussey – production
- Tim Palmer – production, mixing (at 62 Studios, Austin, Texas), rabble backing vocals on track 7
- Julianne Regan – additional vocals on tracks 1, 12
- Ville Valo – additional vocals on track 2
- Gary Numan – additional vocals on track 3
- Evi Vine – additional vocals on tracks 5, 7
- Martin Gore – backing vocals on track 11
- George D. Allen – Hammond organ and rabble backing vocals on track 7
- Stevie Vine – additional sonic guitar on track 7
- Veronica, Sarah Dean – rabble backing vocals on track 7
- Duke Garwood – alto clarinet and alto saxophone on track 12

== Charts ==
Chart (2016)	Peak position
Belgian Albums (Ultratop Wallonia)	181
German Albums (Offizielle Top 100)	49
Scottish Albums (Official Charts)	22
UK Albums (Official Charts)	38
UK Independent Albums (Official Charts)	12
UK Rock & Metal Albums (Official Charts)	2
