= Beyond the Pale (song) =

1988 single by the Mission

Single by the Mission

from the album Children
- B-side: "Tadeusz"
- Released: April 1988
- Recorded: 1987
- Studio: The Manor Studios (Oxfordshire, England)
- Genre: Gothic rock
- Length: 7:49
- Label: Mercury; Phonogram
- Songwriters: Craig Adams; Mick Brown; Simon Hinkler; Wayne Hussey

The Mission singles chronology
"Tower of Strength" (1988)	"Beyond the Pale" (1988)	"Butterfly on a Wheel" (1990)

"Beyond the Pale" is a song by English gothic rock band the Mission, released in 1988. It was the second of three singles planned to be released from their second studio album, Children (1988). It peaked at No. 32 on the UK Singles Chart, remaining in the charts for four weeks.

== Background ==
The song was recorded at The Manor Studio in Oxfordshire, England, between August and December 1987, becoming the opening song on the 1988-released album, Children. It was the second single released from Children. The highest point it reached on the singles chart was 32; the poor charting of the single unsettled the band and record company, leading to the proposed follow-up single, "Kingdom Come", being cancelled, except in America where a promotional video for the single had been filmed.

== Critical reception ==
One reviewer described the song as "perhaps their best track from the album Children", while another said "more swirling guitars and Jim Kerr soundalike vocals from the increasingly-unexciting Mission. Dull but inoffensive." Mark Barden for the Dorset Evening Echo liked the song but expressed a preference for the B-side, "Tadeusz", which the band played through loudspeakers whilst they walked onto the stage at live gigs. while the Cambridge Evening News, which described the song as having "tired rock riffs", quoted one of the lines from the song: "Send me down the river, and it sounds like a good idea." (Note: The line is actually "Sell me down the river...")

In a Melody Maker review of the album, the track was described as having the "usual flourishing arpeggios on the melodramatic Beyond the Pale."

== Track listings ==
- 7" single (MYTH6)

A. "Beyond the Pale"
B. "Tadeusz"

- 12" (MYTHX6)

A. "Beyond the Pale"
B1. "Tadeusz (1912–1988)"
B2. "Love Me to Death (reprise)"
B3. "Forevermore"

- 12" (MYTHX622)

A. "Beyond the Pale"
B1. "Tadeusz (1912–1988)"
B2. "Forevermore"

- CD (MTHCD6)

A. "Beyond the Pale"
B1. "Tadeusz (1912–1988)"
B2. "Love Me to Death (reprise)"
B3. "Forevermore"

- CD (MTHCD62)

A. "Beyond the Pale (Armageddon Mix)"
B1. "Tower of Strength (Bombay Edit)"
B2. "Tadeusz (1912–1988)"

== Personnel ==
- Craig Adams – bass guitar
- Mick Brown – drums
- Simon Hinkler – guitar, keyboards
- Wayne Hussey – vocals, guitar
- Julianne Regan - backing vocals

== Charts ==
Chart (1990)	Peak position
UK Singles Chart	32
