= Neverland (The Mission album) =

1995 studio album by The Mission

Studio album by The Mission
- Released: 13 February 1995
- Recorded: 1993–1994
- Genres: Gothic rock; alternative rock; industrial rock
- Length: 66:22
- Label: Dragnet
- Producers: Wayne Hussey, Joe Gibb

The Mission chronology
Salad Daze (1994)	Neverland (1995)	Blue (1996)

Professional ratings
Review scores
Source	Rating
Allmusic	1.5/5 stars

Neverland is the fifth regular studio album by The Mission. It was released on the 13 February 1995 by Equator Records (UK) and Sony (Europe) and reached #58 in the UK Albums Chart. It was preceded by the single 'Swoon' while a second single 'Lose Myself In You' was released in Germany only. An expanded version appeared on the 7 March 2011 through Demon Edsel Records.

== Background ==
The album was recorded and produced by Hussey and the band over a three-year period. The first tracks were produced in 1992 on the back of the Masque sessions. After the departure of Craig Adams the Mission had been reduced to a duo and active recruitment of new members took place over the last three months of 1992. Former Spear of Destiny guitarist Mark Gemini Thwaite and keyboardist Rik Carter joined together with Matthew Parkin on bass. The latter left at the start of 1993. He was replaced briefly by the former The Pretenders bassist Andy Hobson,. and then Andy Cousin (formerly of All About Eve) became a permanent member. In August 1993 Hussey revealed in the Melody Maker that the album was provisionally called Dog Lover and that Joe Gibb had again assisted with the production. Tracks such as "Raising Cain", "Afterglow" and Daddy's Gone to Heaven" had been recorded by this stage, while "Swoon" was listed among the songs Hussey mentioned. After the ClubMission Tour of 1993, the band were told by their label that the new material had been rejected.

The Sum & Substance collection completed the contract with Phonogram, which included a Mark "Spike" Stent version of "Afterglow". The band introduced the song "Whore" during their short 1994 tour, while a stripped-down version of "Afterglow" that was included on the album as "Afterglow (reprise)". During a 1994 BBC Radioshow "Swim with the Dolphins" was first aired. Towards the end of the summer of 1995 the band signed a contract with Equator Records while Hussey began to compile the album from the various sessions. Assisted by Steve Whitfield, the track listing was finalised while an EP entitled The Mission:1 was released in October 1994 containing "Raising Cain", "Sway" and "Neverland (instrumental)".

== Critical reception ==
Andrew Mueller, writing in Melody Maker, described the album as "a stadium record that is never going to fill a theatre, a defiant gurgle on the way down the sinkhole".

== Track listing ==
1. "Raising Cain" – 6:12
2. "Sway" – 4:44
3. "Lose Myself in You" – 4:21
4. "Swoon" – 5:07
5. "Afterglow (reprise)" – 7:50
6. "Stars Don't Shine Without You" – 4:57
7. "Celebration" – 2:24
8. "Cry Like a Baby" – 5:32
9. "Heaven Knows" – 6:22
10. "Swim with the Dolphins" – 3:17
11. "Neverland (vocal)" – 4:22
12. "Daddy's Going to Heaven Now" – 11:08

== Personnel ==
- Wayne Hussey – lead vocals, guitars, piano
- Mick Brown – drums
- Mark Gemini Thwaite – guitars, mandolin
- Andy Cousin – bass
- Rik Carter – keyboards
- Matthew Parkin – bass (uncredited)
- Andy Hobson – bass (uncredited)

== Charts ==
Chart (1995)	Peak position
German Albums (Offizielle Top 100)	59
Scottish Albums (Official Charts)	96
Swedish Albums (Sverigetopplistan)	42
Swiss Albums (Schweizer Hitparade)	42
UK Albums (Official Charts)	58
UK Rock & Metal Albums (Official Charts)	6

Chart (2020)	Peak position
Spanish Albums (Promusicae)	65
