= God's Own Medicine =

1986 studio album by The Mission

Studio album by the Mission
- Released: 10 November 1986
- Recorded: August–September 1986
- Studios: Ridge Farm and Utopia Studios
- Genre: Gothic rock
- Length: 57:41
- Label: Mercury
- Producers: Tim Palmer; The Mission

The Mission chronology
God's Own Medicine (1986)	The First Chapter (1987)

The Mission studio album chronology
God's Own Medicine (1986)	Children (1988)

Singles from God's Own Medicine
- 1. "Stay with Me" Released: 6 October 1986; 2. "Wasteland" Released: 5 January 1987; 3. "Severina" Released: 2 March 1987

God's Own Medicine is the debut studio album by the English gothic rock band the Mission. It was released on 10 November 1986 by Mercury Records. The original LP version contains 10 songs. The CD and cassette versions had the songs "Blood Brother" and "Island in the Stream" added. Both had previously appeared on the "III" ("Stay with Me") single. The album peaked at number 14 on the UK Albums Chart.

== Background ==
The band had spent much of 1986 touring around Europe and had performed two radio broadcasts for the BBC. In the summer of that year, they signed with Phonogram after releasing two independent singles. Much of the material had featured on the tour and the band completed Gods Own Medicine within a period of four weeks. The record was produced by Tim Palmer and the Mission and recorded at Ridge Farm and Utopia Studios.

Three singles were released from the album, "Stay with Me", "Wasteland" and "Severina".

== Critical reception ==
Professional ratings
Review scores
Source	Rating
AllMusic	4.5/5 stars
Classic Rock	8/10
Encyclopedia of Popular Music	2/5 stars
The Great Rock Discography	7/10
MusicHound	4/5
Record Collector	3/5 stars
Record Mirror	3/5
Smash Hits	9½/10

Writing for American publication Trouser Press, Ira Robbins described the album as a "dull and insipid guitar/keyboard/string bombast", and "a horrible amalgam of Led Zeppelin, Yes and Echo & the Bunnymen". AllMusic described it as "the marker for goth rock's invasion of the U.K. charts for a good chunk of the late '80s".

== Reissue ==
A remastered version appeared in June 2007 with four bonus tracks, including the original intro to "Love Me to Death" (previously available only on the "Wasteland" video-cd, and as a hidden track on the B-side of the 12" single release of "Severina") that had to be cut due to the time constraints of vinyl. Consequently, its insertion has not been taken into account in the track list of the remaster—listing the two tracks as "Love Me to Death (Original Full Length Version)"—and thus all tracks after eleven are mislabelled as being one track ahead of where they actually appear on the album.

It was certified gold in the UK.

== Track listing ==
All lyrics are written by Wayne Hussey; all music is composed by Craig Adams, Mick Brown, Simon Hinkler and Wayne Hussey.

No.	Title	Length
1.	"Wasteland"	5:42
2.	"Bridges Burning"	4:08
3.	"Garden of Delight (Hereafter)"	3:42
4.	"Stay with Me"	4:37
5.	"Blood Brother"	5:16
6.	"Let Sleeping Dogs Die"	5:53
7.	"Sacrilege"	4:45
8.	"Dance on Glass"	5:10
9.	"And the Dance Goes On"	4:10
10.	"Severina"	4:15
11.	"Love Me to Death"	4:38
12.	"Island in a Stream"	5:25

2007 re-release version
No.	Title	Length
1.	"Wasteland"	5:42
2.	"Bridges Burning"	4:08
3.	"Garden of Delight (Hereafter)"	3:42
4.	"Stay with Me"	4:37
5.	"Blood Brother"	5:16
6.	"Let Sleeping Dogs Die"	5:53
7.	"Sacrilege"	4:45
8.	"Dance on Glass"	5:10
9.	"And the Dance Goes On"	4:10
10.	"Severina"	4:15
11.	"Love You to Death" (Love Me to Death intro)	1:25
12.	"Love Me to Death"	4:38
13.	"Island in a Stream"	5:25
14.	"Wishing Well" (Free cover)	2:48
15.	"Wasteland" (anniversary mix)	7:39
16.	"Severina" (Aqua-Marina mix)	6:09

== Personnel ==
=== The Mission ===
- Craig Adams – bass guitar, production
- Mick Brown – drums, production
- Simon Hinkler – guitars, keyboards, production
- Wayne Hussey – vocals, guitars, production

=== Additional personnel ===
- Tim Palmer – production
- Julianne Regan – additional vocals
- Adam Peters – string arrangements
- The Leisure Process – sleeve design
- Sandy Ball – sleeve design
- KEV – mastering

== Charts ==
Chart (1986–87)	Peak position
Canada Top Albums/CDs (RPM)	43
German Albums (Offizielle Top 100)	59
Swedish Albums (Sverigetopplistan)	30
UK Albums (Official Charts)	14
US Billboard 200	108

== Certifications ==
Region	Certification	Certified units/sales
United Kingdom (BPI)	Silver	60,000^{^}
^{^} Shipments figures based on certification alone.
