= Carved in Sand =

1990 studio album by the Mission

Studio album by The Mission
- Released: 5 February 1990
- Recorded: May–August 1989
- Genre: Gothic rock
- Length: 46:57
- Label: Phonogram/Mercury
- Producer: Tim Palmer

The Mission chronology
Children (1988)	Carved in Sand (1990)	Grains of Sand (1990)

Singles from Carved in Sand
- 1. "Butterfly on a Wheel" Released: 2 January 1990; 2. "Deliverance" Released: 26 February 1990; 3. "Into the Blue" Released: May 1990; 4. "Amelia" Released: 1990 (US)

Professional ratings
Review scores
Source	Rating
AllMusic	4.5/5 stars
Q	3/5 stars

Carved in Sand is the third regular studio album by The Mission, released in 1990. It reached number 7 in the UK Albums Chart, making it the second of two top ten albums and overall best-selling album in the band's career. Four singles were released from the album: "Butterfly on a Wheel" (number 12, January 1990), "Deliverance" (number 27, March 1990), "Into the Blue" (number 32, June 1990), and "Amelia", which was released in the United States. The band had invited members of its fan club to help select the tracks for the album.

A "companion" album with outtakes that were not included on Carved in Sand - entitled Grains of Sand - was released in November the same year.

A deluxe two-disc edition of the album was released in February 2008. It included outtakes, the album Grains of Sand and some live cover songs from the 1970s, performed under the name The Metal Gurus (a reference to the song "Metal Guru" by T. Rex, which was one of the tracks covered).

Carved in Sand marked the return of Tim Palmer as producer. The album was recorded at Jacobs Studios and mixed at Swanyard Studios.

== Track listing ==
Except where noted: all music by Adams, Brown, Hinkler and Hussey; and words by Hussey

=== 1990 release ===
1. "Amelia" - 2:55
2. "Into the Blue" - 4:11
3. "Butterfly on a Wheel" - 5:44
4. "Sea of Love" - 5:23
5. "Deliverance" - 6:03
6. "Grapes of Wrath" - 4:20
7. "Belief" - 7:34
8. "Paradise (Will Shine Like the Moon)" - 3:54
9. "Hungry as the Hunter" - 5:14
10. "Lovely" - 1:59

=== 2008 reissue ===
Carved in Sand

1. "Amelia" - 2:54
2. "Into the Blue" - 4:12
3. "Butterfly on a Wheel" - 5:44
4. "Sea of Love" - 5:20
5. "Deliverance" - 6:04
6. "Grapes of Wrath" - 4:20
7. "Belief" - 7:35
8. "Paradise (Will Shine Like the Moon)" - 3:53
9. "Hungry as the Hunter" - 5:14
10. "Lovely" - 2:06

Bonus tracks

11. "Hands Across the Ocean" (Andy Partridge Mix) - 3:57
12. "Divided We Fall" (Demo) - 3:44
13. "Sea of Love" (Demo) - 5:11
14. "Hungry as the Hunter" (Demo) - 5:36
15. "Bird of Passage" (Demo) - 5:41
16. "Butterfly on a Wheel" (Hoedown C&W Version) - 3:28
17. "Hands Across the Ocean" (White Elephant Mix) - 3:55

Grains of Sand

1. "Hands Across the Ocean" - 3:49
2. "The Grip of Disease" - 4:13
3. "Divided We Fall" - 3:41
4. "Mercenary" - 2:51
5. "Mr. Pleasant" (Ray Davies) - 2:52
6. "Kingdom Come (Forever and Again)" - 4:58
7. "Heaven Sends You" - 4:54
8. "Sweet Smile of a Mystery" - 3:55
9. "Tower of Strength" (The Casbah Mix) - 4:31
10. "Butterfly on a Wheel" (Troubadour Mix) - 4:30
11. "Love" (John Lennon) - 1:52
12. "Bird of Passage (6:38)

Bonus tracks
The Metal Gurus - Live at Aston Villa Dec '89

13. "Ballroom Blitz" (Nicky Chinn & Mike Chapman) - 3:40
14. "Cracked Actor" (David Bowie) - 2:49
15. "Mama Weer All Crazee Now" (Jim Lea, Noddy Holder) - 3:47
16. "Get It On" (Marc Bolan) - 4:00
17. "Caroline" (Robert Young, Francis Rossi) - 3:50
18. "Virginia Plain" (Bryan Ferry) - 2:51
19. "Metal Guru" (Marc Bolan) - 2:28
20. "Blockbuster" (Nicky Chinn, Mike Chapman) - 3:01
21. "Merry Xmas Everybody" (James Lea, Neville Holder) - 3:15

== Personnel ==
The Mission

- Craig Adams – bass guitar
- Mick Brown – drums
- Simon Hinkler – guitar, keyboards
- Wayne Hussey – vocals, guitar

Additional musicians

- Reeves Gabrels – additional guitar on "Into the Blue" and "Hungry as the Hunter"
- Baluji Shrivastav – sitar on "Sea of Love"
- Guy Chambers – piano on "Grapes of Wrath"

== Charts ==
Chart (1990)	Peak position
Austrian Albums (Ö3 Austria)	25
Canada Top Albums/CDs (RPM)	79
Dutch Albums (Album Top 100)	33
German Albums (Offizielle Top 100)	16
New Zealand Albums (RMNZ)	34
Swedish Albums (Sverigetopplistan)	17
Swiss Albums (Schweizer Hitparade)	7
UK Albums (Official Charts)	7
US Billboard 200	101

== Certifications ==
Region	Certification	Certified units/sales
United Kingdom (BPI)	Gold	100,000^{^}
^{^} Shipments figures based on certification alone.
