= Simon Hinkler =

English guitarist

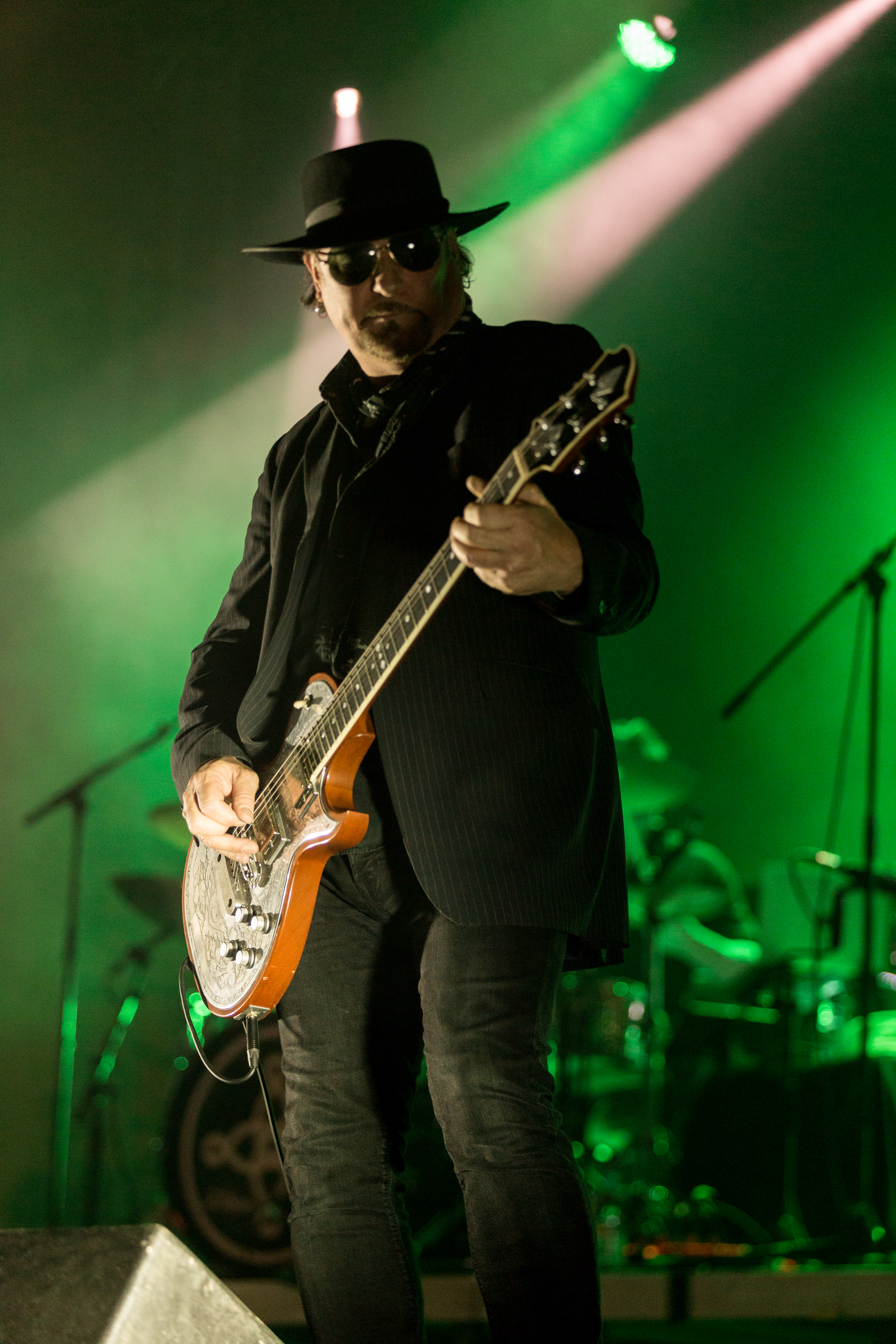
- Hinkler with The Mission in 2017

Background information
- Born: Simon Thomas Hinkler; 13 November 1959 (age 66)
- Genres: Post-punk; alternative rock; gothic rock
- Occupations: Musician; record producer; songwriter
- Instruments: Guitar; bass; keyboards; mandolin
- Years active: 1978–present
- Member of: The Mission
- Formerly of: TV Product; Artery; Pulp

Simon Thomas Hinkler (born 13 November 1959) is an English guitarist, keyboard player, songwriter and producer, most notable for being the lead guitarist for the rock group The Mission from 1986 to 1990 and since 2011.

== Early musical career ==
Hinkler formed his first band, TV Product, while working at Killis cleaners, Sheffield in 1978. The other members of the group were his housemate Tony Perrin and three friends from the polytechnic. After many line-up changes Hinkler left the band to join Artery on keyboards. He was part of the line-up which recorded the group's most well known songs, including "Into the Garden", which reached number four on John Peel's festive 50 for 1981. This incarnation of the group started to disintegrate around this time, and Hinkler spent much of the next year mentoring the young Jarvis Cocker. He joined the 1982 lineup of Pulp and produced the band's first LP, It, playing bass, piano, guitar and mandolin, as well as co-writing the band's début single "My Lighthouse". After this he had another spell in Artery, this time joined by his brother David Hinkler, also formerly of Pulp, and around this time played with a few other bands, including The Flight Commander and Midnight Choir.

== The Mission ==
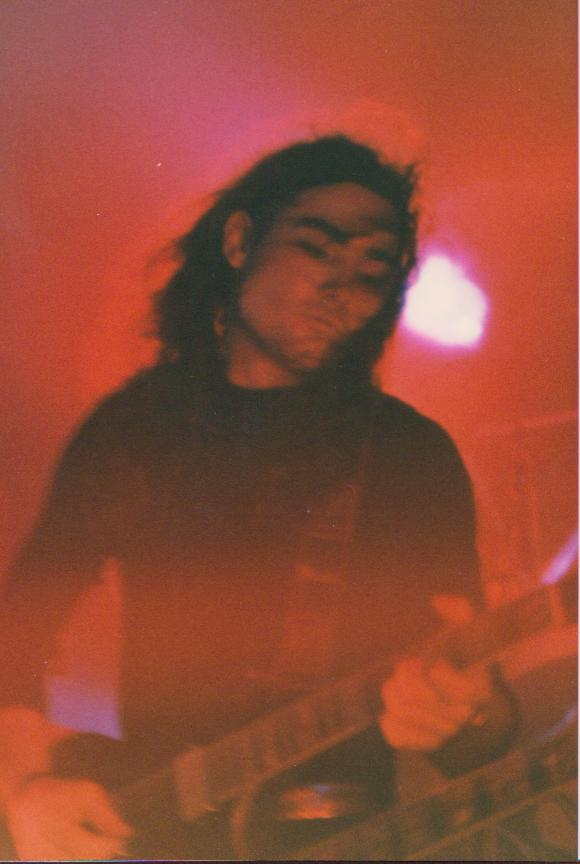
Hinkler in 1986

In late 1985 Wayne Hussey and Craig Adams left The Sisters of Mercy and formed The Mission with Hinkler and drummer Mick Brown (of Red Lorry Yellow Lorry). In early 1986 they embarked on their first European tour, supporting The Cult. They released two singles independently, both reaching No.1 in the UK alternative charts, before signing a worldwide record deal with Phonogram (now Universal).

Their first single for the new label, "Stay with Me", went straight into the UK chart at No. 30 followed by their debut album, God's Own Medicine, at No. 14. They continued to release hit singles including anthemic classics such as "Wasteland", "Tower of Strength", "Beyond the Pale", "Deliverance" and "Butterfly on a Wheel". Total worldwide album sales to date have exceeded three million. Hinkler left the Mission during their 1990 US tour, but made guest appearances on later dates towards the end of the final UK leg of the tour and at Finsbury Park the following year.

After leaving the Mission, he recorded an album called A Room Full of This in his home studio with Mark Gouldthorpe (former Artery vocalist) under the name "The Flight Commander" and which was released in 1994. This was the pair's second album together. Their first was Flight Commander Solitude and the Snake was recorded shortly before he joined the Mission, and so the project was put hold.

When Hussey decided to disband The Mission permanently in 2008, after twenty-two years of activity, he invited Hinkler to join the then current lineup on tour. He played with the band for four nights in Germany before moving onto the final four nights at the O2 Shepherd's Bush Empire, London from Wednesday 27 February through to Saturday 1 March 2008. The performances were subsequently released on the DVD The Mission: The Final Chapter.

In December 2010 Hussey announced live shows featuring a re-formation of the original line-up (minus drummer Mick Brown) of The Mission to celebrate the band's 25th anniversary. Initially two dates were announced for October 2011 at London O2, Brixton and O2, Leeds. However, in June 2011 Hussey announced extra tour dates in Europe in October and November 2011.

In October 2011, Hinkler began to perform once more with a re-formed Mission, and he has been a permanent member since then. Two more Mission albums featuring Hinkler, Craig Adams and Hussey have so far been released, namely The Brightest Light (2013) and Another Fall from Grace (2016).

== Solo and support work ==
In 2005, he released his first solo album, Lose the Faith. After living in New Mexico and New York City for more than a decade, Hinkler returned to England in 2009.

In February 2012, The Eden House released their Timeflows EP which features Hinkler as a guest guitarist. He has since also recorded tracks with them on their albums Half Life (2013) and Songs for the Broken Ones (2017). In the early part of 2011, Hinkler played a series of guest support appearances with Anne-Marie Hurst, The March Violets, and The Eden House.
