= The Brightest Light =

2013 studio album by The Mission

Studio album by The Mission
- Released: 20 September 2013
- Genre: Gothic rock
- Length: 59:53
- Producer: David M. Allen

The Mission chronology
God Is a Bullet (2007)	The Brightest Light (2013)	Another Fall from Grace (2016)

The Brightest Light is the ninth studio album by English gothic rock band The Mission released on 20 September 2013.

== Critical reception ==
Professional ratings
Review scores
Source	Rating
AllMusic	3.5/5 stars
PopMatters	6/10 stars

J.C. Macek III wrote in PopMatters, "For the repetition, occasional triteness and borrowed elements, The Brightest Light isn't a perfect album from the Mission. That said, it is very good and has the potential to please established fans as well as the newly interested. If nothing else, The Brightest Light is a fine argument for the case that "Goth Rock lives."

== Track listing ==
All songs were written by Wayne Hussey, except where noted

CD1:

1. "Black Cat Bone" – 8:06
2. "Everything But the Squeal" – 4:56
3. "Sometimes the Brightest Light Comes from the Darkest Place" – 5:29
4. "Born Under a Good Sign" – 4:14
5. "The Girl in a Furskin Rug" – 3:49
6. "When the Trap Clicks Shut Behind Us" – 4:47
7. "Ain't No Prayer in the Bible Can Save Me Now" – 5:15
8. "Just Another Pawn in Your Game" – 3:47
9. "From the Oyster Comes the Pearl" – 5:13
10. "Swan Song" (Hussey, David M. Allen) – 7:06
11. "Litany for the Faithful" – 7:11

CD2:

1. "Drag" – 2:57
2. "I'm Fallin' Again" – 5:46
3. "The Long Way 'Round Is Sometimes the Only Way Home" – 3:54
4. "The Girl in a Furskin Rug" (Wayne Hussey demo) – 3:46
5. "Born Under a Good Sign" (Wayne Hussey demo) – 4:48
6. "Black Cat Bone" (Wayne Hussey demo) – 4:37
7. "From the Oyster Comes the Pearl" (Wayne Hussey demo) – 4:38
8. "When the Trap Clicks Shut Behind Us" (Wayne Hussey demo) – 4:45
9. "Ain't No Prayer in the Bible Can Save Me Now" (Wayne Hussey demo with Erica Nockalls) – 5:37

== Personnel ==
=== The Mission ===
- Craig Adams – bass guitar
- Simon Hinkler – guitar, keyboards
- Wayne Hussey – vocals, guitars
- Mike Kelly – drums

=== Additional personnel ===
- David M. Allen – production

== Charts ==
Chart (2013)	Peak position
German Albums (Offizielle Top 100)	92
UK Independent Albums (OCC)	49
