= Blue (The Mission album) =

1996 studio album by The Mission

Studio album by The Mission
- Released: 3 June 1996
- Recorded: 1996
- Genre: Rock
- Label: Equator
- Producer: Wayne Hussey

The Mission chronology
Neverland (1995)	Blue (1996)	Resurrection (1999)

Professional ratings
Review scores
Source	Rating
Allmusic	link

Blue is the sixth studio album by The Mission. It was released in June 1996 on Equator Records (UK) and Dragnet/Sony (Germany). It reached #72 on the UK Albums Chart and #11 on the UK Independent Albums Chart. The single "Coming Home" appeared in Germany only.

== Background ==
Contractually obliged to record another album Wayne Hussey began to demo songs for the sixth regular studio album in December 1995. He rented a small apartment in the city of Bath where the bulk of the material was written. Unlike previous occasions, a set period of recording was set aside and the band had strictly two weeks of recording scheduled. With the sessions concluded Hussey travelled to New York City where he compiled the album together with music producer Mark Saunders. The song "Evermore and Again" is a re-recording of "Forevermore" a B-side of the "Beyond the Pale" single. During the subsequent 'Tour '96' Hussey announced that the band was to be dissolved. The album was re-released in 2011 with two bonus tracks "Perfect Sunrise" and "Coming Home (God-like version)".

== Track listing ==
1. "Coming Home" - 2:47
2. "Get Back to You" - 4:27
3. "Drown In Blue" - 4:38
4. "Damaged" - 4:50
5. "More Than This" - 4:39
6. "That Tears Shall Drown the Wind" - 5:23
7. "Black & Blue" - 2:07
8. "Bang Bang" - 4:18
9. "Alpha Man" - 4:33
10. "Cannibal" - 4:15
11. "Dying Room" - 3:54
12. "Evermore and Again" - 5:34

== Personnel ==
- Wayne Hussey – vocals, guitars, production
- Mick Brown – drums
- Mark Gemini Thwaite – guitars
- Andy Cousin – bass
- Rik Carter – keyboards

== Charts ==
Chart (1996)	Peak position
UK Albums (OCC)	73
UK Rock & Metal Albums (OCC)	8
