= The Mission (band) =

English gothic rock band

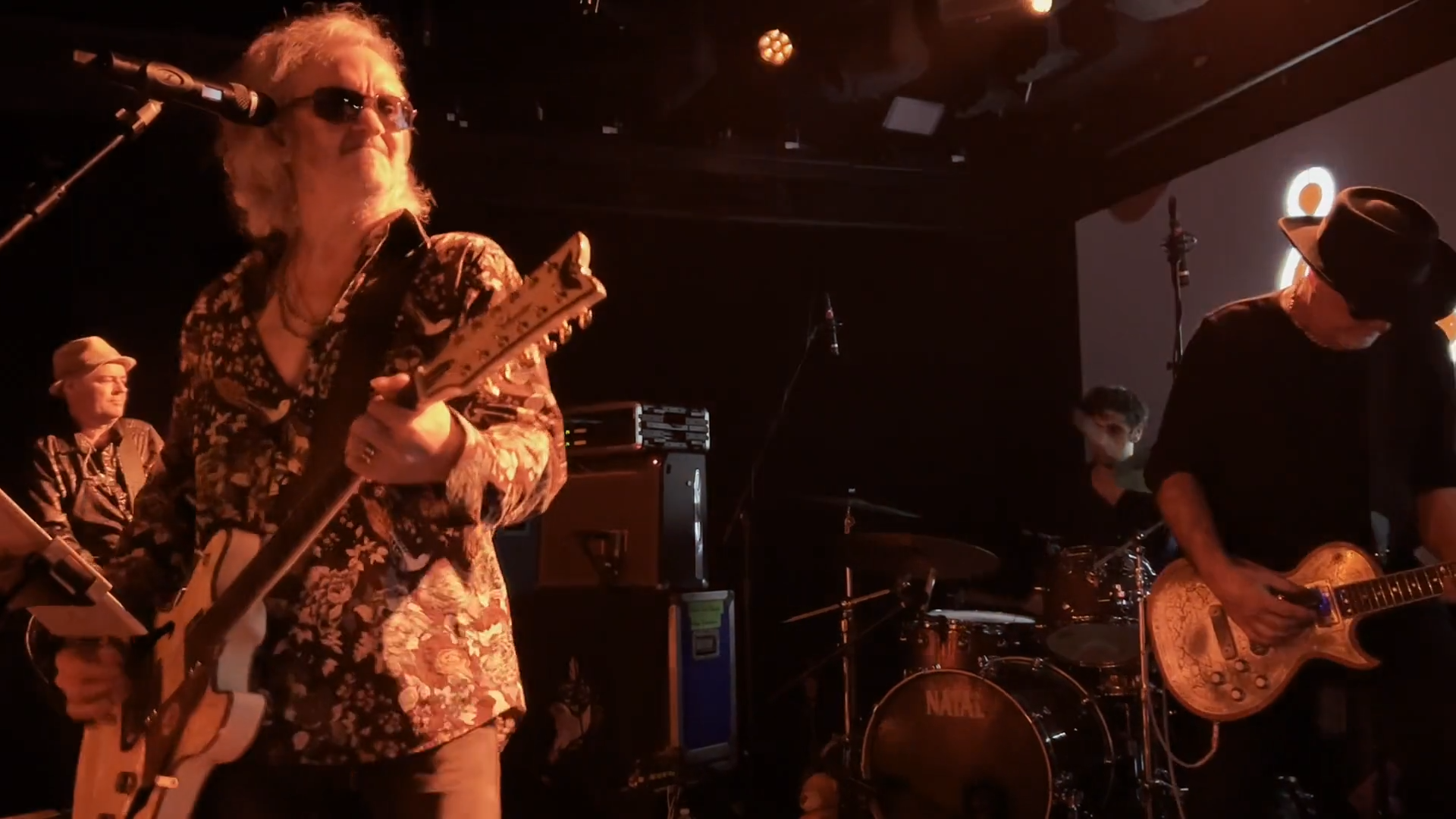
- The Mission performing in 2023

Background information
- Origin: Leeds, England
- Genres: Gothic rock; post-punk; hard rock; alternative rock
- Years active: 1986–1996; 1999–2008; 2011–present
- Labels: SPV; Cooking Vinyl; Playground; Polydor; Polygram; Receiver; Cleopatra; Equator; Vertigo; Nightracks; Chapter 22
- Spinoff of: The Sisters of Mercy
- Members: Wayne Hussey; Craig Adams; Simon Hinkler; Alex Baum
- Past members: Mick Brown; Rik Carter; Andy Cousin; Scott Garrett; Rob Holliday; Mark Thwaite; Rich Vernon; Steve Spring; Mike Kelly
- Website: themissionukband.com

The Mission (known as the Mission UK in the United States) are an English gothic rock band formed in 1986. Initially known as the Sisterhood, the band was started by frontman Wayne Hussey and bassist Craig Adams (both from the Sisters of Mercy), soon adding drummer Mick Brown (Red Lorry Yellow Lorry) and guitarist Simon Hinkler (Artery and Pulp). Aside from Hussey, the lineup has changed several times over the years, and the band has been on hiatus twice.

The band's catalogue consists of ten studio albums: God's Own Medicine (1986), Children (1988), Carved in Sand (1990), Masque (1992), Neverland (1995), Blue (1996), Aura (2001), God Is a Bullet (2007), The Brightest Light (2013), and Another Fall from Grace (2016), with several live albums, compilations, and other miscellaneous releases.

== History ==
=== Incarnation ===
After an aborted recording session with Andrew Eldritch in the summer of 1985, Wayne Hussey and Craig Adams left the Sisters of Mercy. Based in Leeds, the duo continued to work on various musical ideas and recorded them over the autumn. Dismissing the use of a drum machine, Adams and Hussey asked Mick Brown (Red Lorry Yellow Lorry) to help out. By the end of the year, he had joined the band on a permanent basis. With Hussey as frontman and main songwriter, the trio required a second guitarist to facilitate a live setup. They recruited Simon Hinkler (Artery), who also contributed keyboards. The name "the Sisterhood" was chosen as a nod to the past. Rehearsals for the first shows started in January 1986. The new name became a point of discussion in the UK music press, giving the four-piece significant publicity. As the Sisterhood, the band made their live debut on 20 January 1986 at the Alice in Wonderland, London.

While the band was on tour as support to the Cult around Europe, Eldritch released a single as the Sisterhood. Back in the UK, Hinkler was briefly dismissed and reinstated for three dates where the band revealed their new name, the Mission. Although Hussey and Adams were still under contract with WEA, manager Tony Perrin prepared their material for a release. In May, the EP I (Serpents Kiss) appeared on the Chapter 22 label as the Expedition I tour took the band around Europe. Two months later, II (Like a Hurricane/Garden of Delight) was released on the same label and supported by a number of festival slots that culminated in an appearance at the Reading Festival.

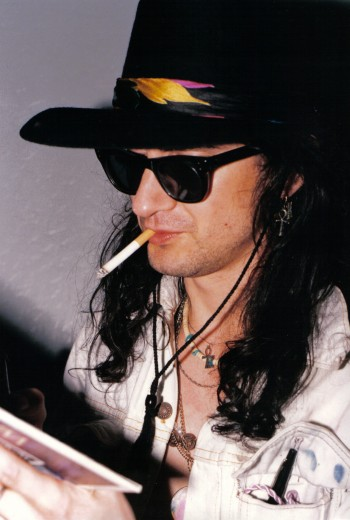
Wayne Hussey in 1987

=== Crusade ===
Hussey and Adams were released from their WEA contracts and the band signed a seven-album recording contract with Phonogram in July 1986. Their debut, God's Own Medicine, was recorded in six weeks with novice producer Tim Palmer, an acquaintance from Hussey's Dead or Alive days. In October, the single "III" ("Stay with Me") was released, preceding the album that appeared the next month. The band set out on a three-month World Crusade I UK/European tour, with their dedicated followers, 'Eskimos', in tow. They appeared on British television a number of times and recorded a session for BBC radio. The single "IV" ("Wasteland") charted at No. 11 in January 1987.

The World Crusade II tour brought the band to North America, where they were known as 'the Mission UK'. The 41-date trek was characterised by substance abuse and led to the collapse of an inebriated Craig Adams in Los Angeles, resulting in him temporarily quitting the band. Sound tech Pete Turner filled in for one show, before they enlisted Chris Bocast to play bass for the remainder of the tour, which included an opening slot for the Psychedelic Furs. In March 1987, the single "V" ("Severina"), with guest vocals by Julianne Regan, was released. Back in England, Adams returned to the band to play a handful of European festivals, and two support dates in Leeds and Edinburgh on U2's Joshua Tree Tour. A live video entitled Crusade was released, capturing the band at the early stage of their career. It coincided with the release of The First Chapter in June 1987, a collection of material from the first two EPs.

=== Children ===
By 1987, Hussey had written new material that was first played during the band's summer festival shows and U2 warm-up performances. The Mission enlisted Led Zeppelin's John Paul Jones to produce their second studio album, Children, engineered by Mark 'Spike' Stent. In October of the same year, Hussey fathered a girl named Hannah, an event that inspired much of the lyrical content. The band moved more towards a Led Zeppelin-inspired hard rock style. In January 1988, the band recorded additional material in London with Stent. In February, the first single, "Tower of Strength", was released, reaching number 12 in the UK Singles Chart. At the end of the same month, the album appeared and charted at number 2 in the UK album chart.

The rest of the year was taken up by the Children Play world tour, including a six-night residency at the London Astoria, Theatre where John Paul Jones made a guest appearance on keyboards. The rest of the tour included a support slot for Robert Plant, the first dates the band played in Latin America, and a small tour of Japan. A second single, "Beyond the Pale", made less of an impact, and a third scheduled for the end of the year was cancelled. At the end of 1988, the Mission embarked on an eight-date arena tour around the UK, while a collection of their music videos, From Dusk to Dawn, was released.

=== Deliverance ===
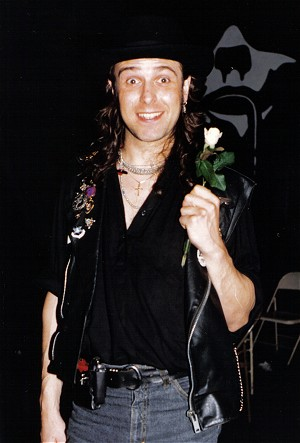
Mick Brown in 1987

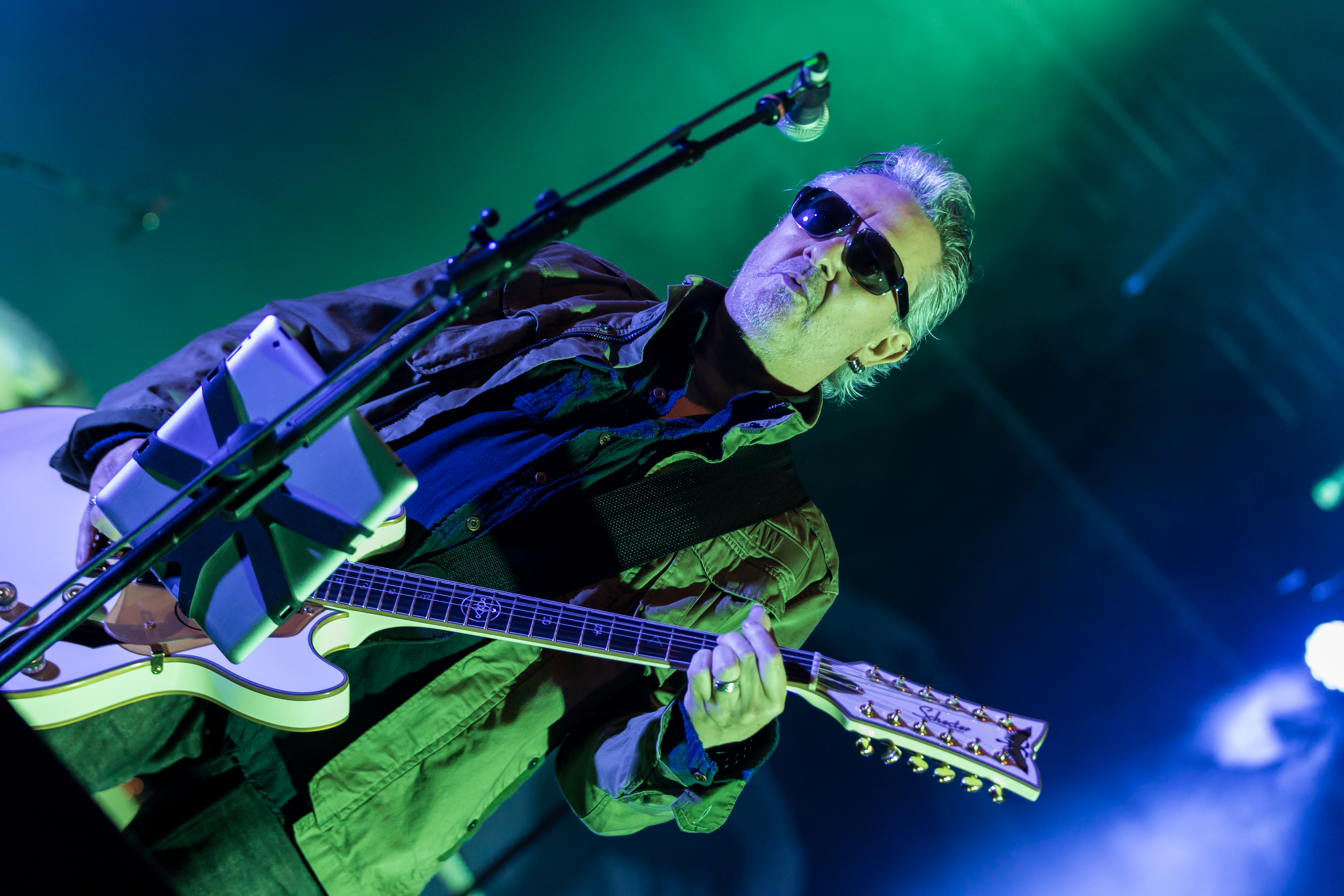
Hussey at the Wave-Gotik-Treffen in Leipzig, Germany, 2017

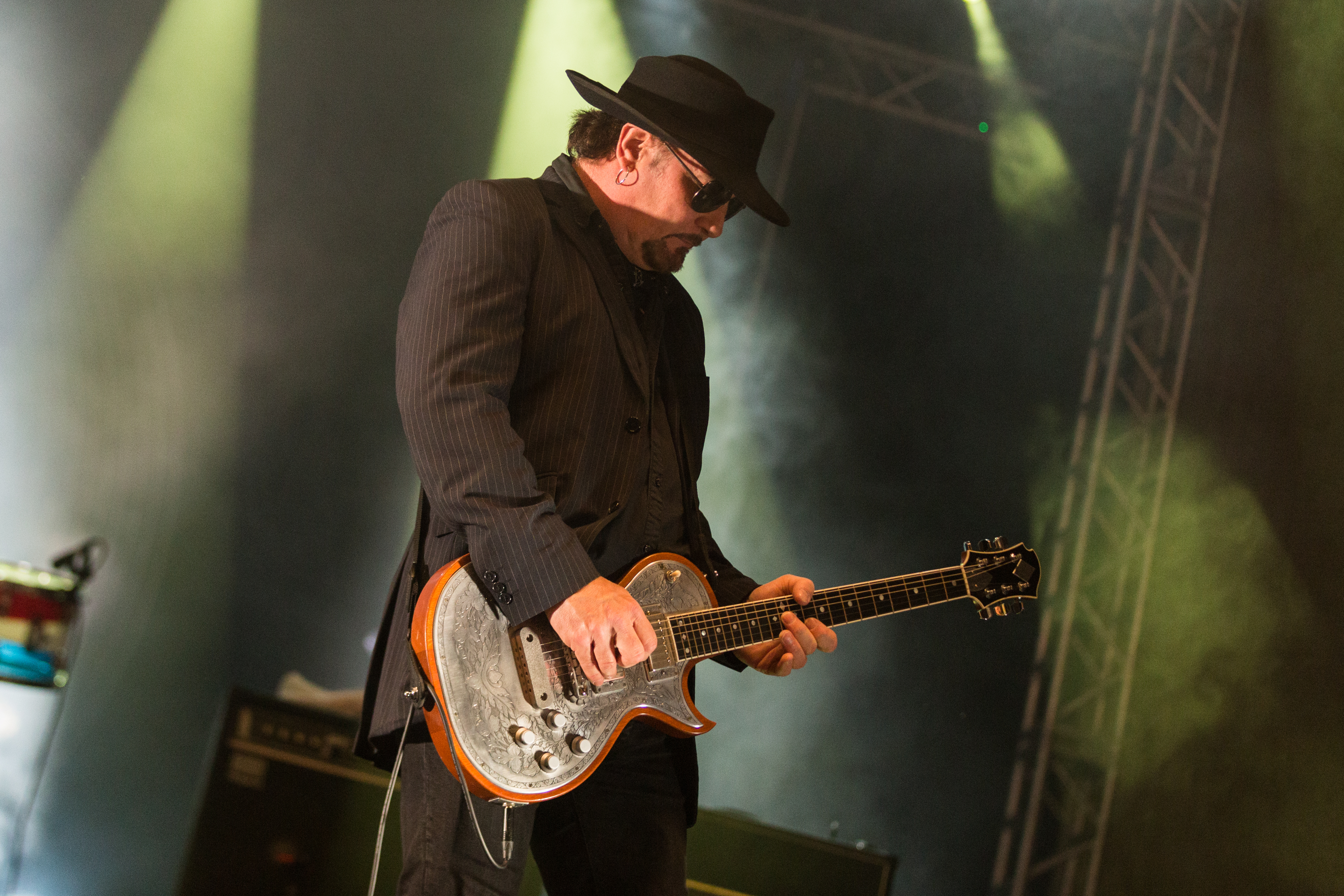
Simon Hinkler, 2017

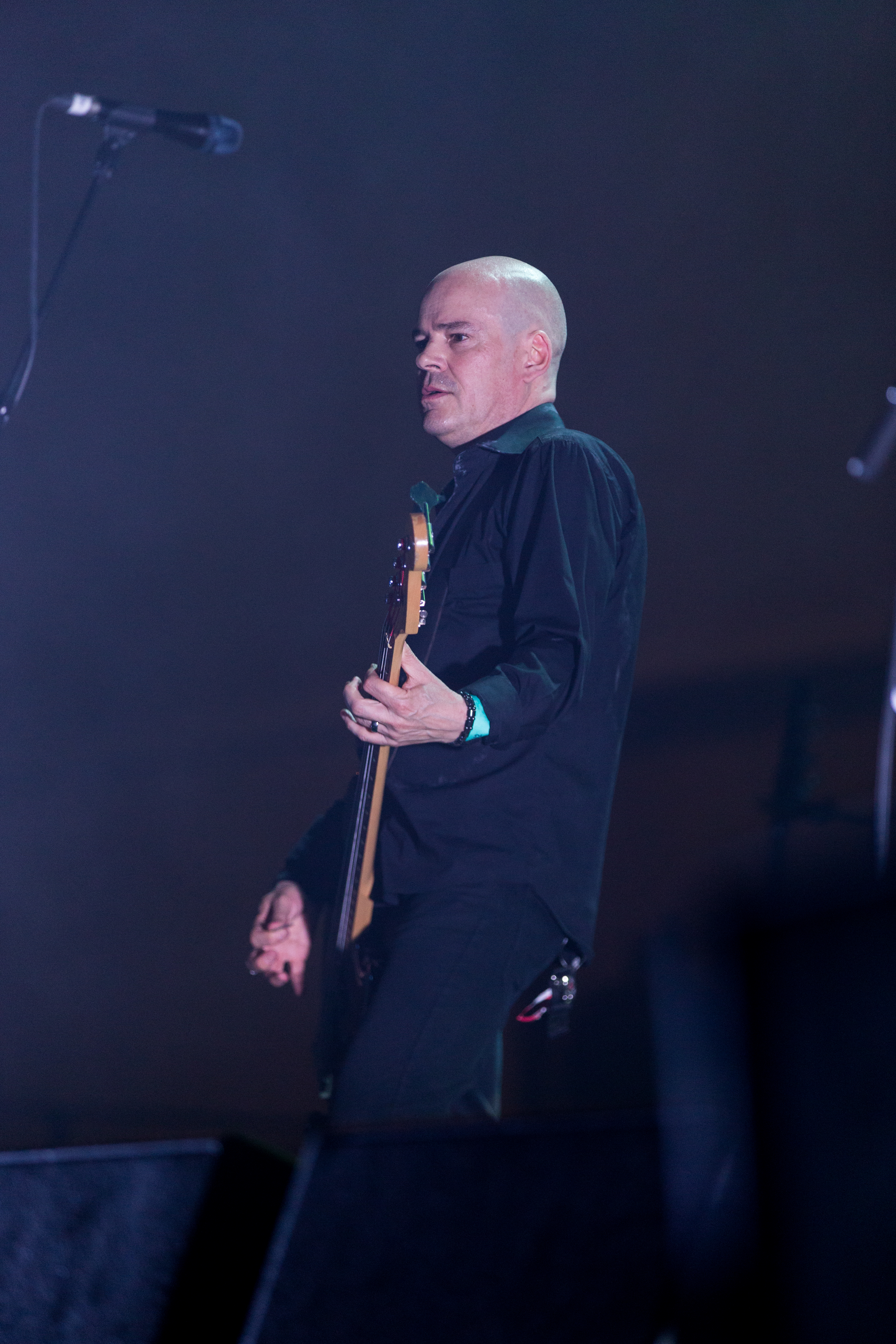
Craig Adams, 2017

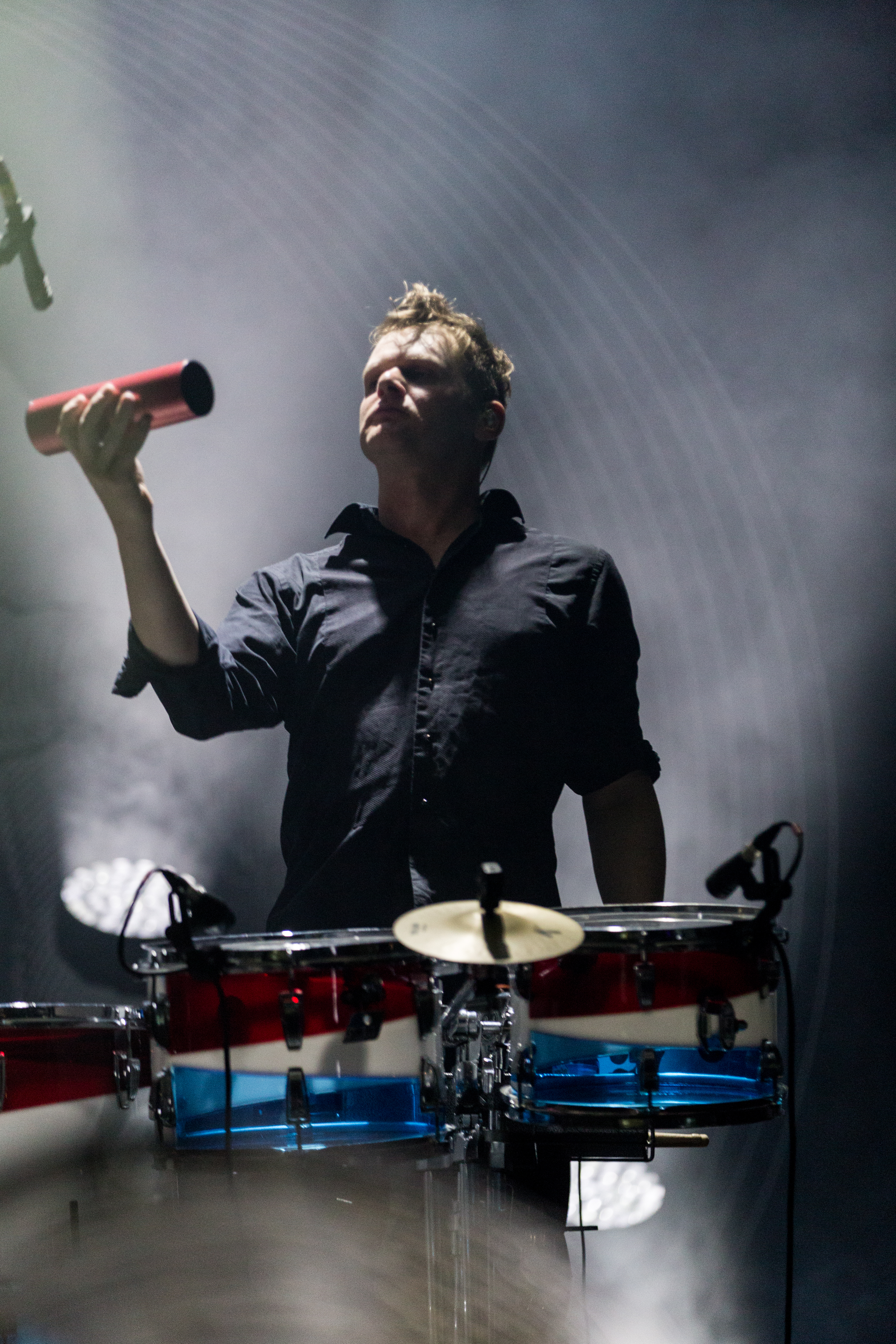
Mike Kelly, 2017

In the first half of 1989, Hussey wrote new material in the Black Mountains in South Wales, before the band reconvened in April to start recording. At the end of the same month, they played two shows, one in support of the Lockerbie bombing and another for the Hillsborough disaster fund. The latter featured guest appearances by Pete Wylie and Mick Jones of the Clash. Hussey, a lifelong Liverpool F.C. fan, was keen to support the victims. In between recording, the band played a number of European festivals supporting the Cure. In contrast to the large shows the band had put on during the Children Play tour, they embarked on a low-key Scottish Highlands tour. The last commitment of the year was a headline appearance at the Reading Festival, before the band returned to the studio to complete the album.

They once again enlisted Tim Palmer to produce the record, while Reeves Gabrels, Baluji Shrivastav, and Guy Chambers also made contributions. Slated for an early-1990 release, the recording of the Carved in Sand album was completed by the end of August 1989. To kill time, the foursome formed a glam rock tribute band, the Metal Gurus, playing support for the Wonder Stuff towards the end of the year. The first single, "Butterfly on a Wheel", was released in January 1990 and narrowly missed the top ten. The new album appeared a month later, together with the "Waves upon the Sand" video that documented the recording sessions and Scottish tour of the previous year.

The Deliverance tour in support of the album was problematic. The band hired David Wolfenden as a supplemental guitarist to give Hussey free rein as the frontman. An inebriated Hussey showed up on the James Whale show and reports of their debauched behaviour continued to appear in the press. The release of a second single, "Deliverance", coincided with the UK arena dates. Hinkler contracted scarlet fever, leading to some cancellations. Personal tensions led to a confrontation during the North American leg of the tour, and Simon Hinkler left the band after a show at Montreal's Metropolis. The remaining members continued with a variation of stand-ins that included Tim Bricheno (of All About Eve) before he joined the Sisters of Mercy. A third single, "Into the Blue" was released in May 1990 to coincide with a number of festival dates, including a headlining slot at Pinkpop and indoor dates to replace the cancelled French dates from earlier in the year. The band played in Australia and New Zealand for the first time in their career. For the second half of 1990, they enlisted Paul "Etch" Etchells (ex-Ghost Dance) on keyboards and guitars. This last leg of the tour, which included a performance filmed for the Rockpalast programme, saw Hinkler returning twice as a guest during the encores at Leeds and the final night at the Brixton Academy.

The Mission had a lot of surplus material after the Carved in Sand sessions and had difficulties deciding on the running order of the album. In October 1990, the companion album, Grains of Sand, was released. It contained the rest of the candidates, some of which had already surfaced as B-sides, supplemented by acoustic renditions and cover versions. A single, "Hands Across the Ocean", co-produced by Andy Partridge of XTC, became a minor hit and was backed by a live version of "Amelia". The band and Hinkler were on friendly terms again and they resurrected the Metal Gurus project to record a cover version of "Merry Xmas Everybody" with Noddy Holder and Jim Lea from Slade for the Childline charity.

After a break to recuperate, the band teamed up with engineer Joe Gibb to create a high-tech studio setup. Brown had been soaking up the Leeds dance scene, while Hussey explored folk music. The band, asked to perform a lucrative headlining show at Finsbury Park in 1991, brought out quite a different side, joined by Maartin Allcock of Fairport Convention and Anthony Thistlethwaite of the Waterboys. Their next release, Masque (produced by Mark Saunders), was intended to be a solo release by Hussey. However, the remaining band members contributed to the recording, and the album was released under the group name. Hussey later said, "with Masque, we attempted to break down these preconceptions that people had of us but it didn't go down very well". Adams left the group subsequent to the release of the album. Reduced to a duo, the Mission searched for new members, even placing an advertisement in Melody Maker.

=== Childhood's end ===
The second incarnation of the Mission consisted of Brown, Hussey, Mark Thwaite (formerly of Spear of Destiny) on guitar, Rik Carter (formerly of Pendragon) on keyboards, and eventually Andy Cousin (formerly of All About Eve) on bass. This lineup's first release was a fanclub-only flexi disc cover of the Osmonds song "Crazy Horses" in early 1993. The recording of a new album started, while a BBC live album, No Snow, No Show for the Eskimo, was compiled by Hussey and Joe Gibb. For the first time in three years, the band decided to tour, and a warm-up was arranged as the "Off the Street" benefit for the homeless in Leeds. As Andrew Eldritch signed up, completely unfounded press speculation about a Hussey/Eldritch reunion became rife. The Club Mission tour played smaller venues around Europe, with new tracks "Afterglow" and "Raising Cain" becoming a regular feature in the set.

The end of 1993 saw Hussey remixing "Tower of Strength" with Youth, and revisiting some of the past material for a greatest hits compilation album. A remixed version of "Tower of Strength" appeared in the UK Singles Chart in January 1994, and the band made their last appearance on Top of the Pops. The compilation, entitled Sum and Substance, was released the next month and featured two new tracks: "Sour Puss" and a remix of "Afterglow" by Mark "Spike" Stent. The latter was also released as the final single through Vertigo/Phonogram. The seven-album contract was now up, and neither of the parties was interested in a continued relationship.

Recordings proceeded slowly, while the band negotiated a new independent record deal, and Hussey produced a collection of three BBC sessions as Salad Daze. In late 1994, a single, "Raising Cain", was released on Equator Records. Early in 1995, the single "Swoon" paved the way for the next studio album, Neverland, more or less a Mission signature sound but with a much heavier production. The Neverland tour saw a slight revival in popularity, with two of the concerts being filmed for German television, a promo-only live EP released, and a handful of summer festivals played.

In March 1996, the band set up in Bristol for eight weeks to record new songs that Hussey had been developing. When the resulting album, Blue, was released, it received mixed reviews from music critics but left portions of the old fanbase rather unimpressed. Future interviews would see Hussey hating the album, with only the reworked B-side "Evermore & Again" ever becoming a regular staple in subsequent tours. A short stint around the UK, Belgium, Germany, and the Netherlands afterwards turned out to be a farewell tour: after ten years, Hussey and Brown decided that enough was enough. The band finished it all off with festivals in Spain and South Africa, the latter being their final gig, at the Kyalami racetrack in Johannesburg.

=== Afterlife ===
After the Mission disbanded, Hussey spent his time in Orange County, California, with his wife and young daughter. In semi-retirement, he produced sporadic remixes and singles for Cleopatra Records and Dancing Ferret Records, as well as up-and-coming acts, and contributed a new song for a Mission album put together by Mission fans over the internet.

In 1999, after releasing an album of solo versions of Mission classics in his home studio, Hussey resurrected the band with Adams, drummer Scott Garrett (Adams' bandmate in the Cult), and Mark Thwaite, for what was intended to be a one-off tour with Gene Loves Jezebel across the United States and an also-resurrected All About Eve across the United Kingdom. The success of the tour and the reaction of the crowds gave the band plenty of encouragement to continue beyond the tour, and 2000 saw them take on a mammoth world tour, heading festivals in Europe and sharing the bill with the Sisters of Mercy at the M'era Luna Festival in Germany. A souvenir CD of the 1999 tour was released as Ever After, with the various live tracks complemented by three tracks from the 1995 promo-only Live EP and the even-rarer fanclub-only studio outtake "Crazy Horses".

At the end of 2000, the band recorded tracks for a new album at the Levellers' Brighton studios, and Dave Allen (who produced the first Sisters of Mercy album) was drafted in to oversee the recording of tracks in Bath. Before the release of the album, dubbed Aura, the band were invited to play support for the German tour of the Finnish band HIM. At this juncture, Thwaite left the band (first due to touring commitments with Tricky and later to form the group New Disease), to be replaced by Rob Holliday of Sulpher.

Aura was released on their own Playground label run by former Phonogram A&R man Charlie Eyre. The sound was heavy and the production intricate, but fans noted that several songs were similar to previous Mission songs, notably "Dragonfly", which was similar to the 1990 hit "Butterfly on a Wheel". Nonetheless, the Mission undertook a large world tour supporting the album. However, the stresses of touring and diminishing returns once again saw tensions grow, and during the South American leg of their 2002 tour, Adams decided to leave once more. Hussey continued the leg of the tour by himself, with some acoustic shows backed by pre-recorded tapes, also lining himself up for a number of much more successful solo acoustic shows in Europe.

In early 2003, the Mission gained a new bassist in the form of Rich Vernon and within a matter of months, Garrett also left, to be replaced by Steve Spring. This new lineup carried on through to mid-2004.

=== Lighting the Candles ===
In September 2005, the band's first DVD, Lighting the Candles, was released, complemented by a live CD. It took over a year for Hussey to compile this two-DVD set, which includes a live gig, some video clips, a commented biography and discography, as well as a number of interviews, live performances, and backstage shots. The result gained good reviews and good sales. The single "Breathe Me In" hit the top of the Alternative Chart in Germany, and the Mission once again undertook an extensive EU tour. Mark Thwaite rejoined the band, as Holliday was occupied touring with the Prodigy. The band evolved the hard rock angle further, while audience ranks grew throughout the tour. Hussey announced that 2006 would hold no tours, as he would concentrate on a new album and his personal projects. As well as Lighting the Candles, 2005 saw the release of Waves Upon the Sand and Crusade for the first time on DVD.

In 2006, Hussey marked the 20th anniversary of the Mission with the issue of a limited edition T-shirt designed especially for the occasion. Meanwhile, Phonogram Records released another "best of", Anthology: The Phonogram Years, a two-CD set including all eleven of the band's Top 40 hits alongside rare mixes, long-lost B-sides, BBC sessions, five previously unavailable tracks, and five tracks appearing on CD for the first time.

=== God Is a Bullet ===
A new single, "Keep It in the Family", was released in March 2007, followed a month later by the new album God Is a Bullet, featuring Hussey, Thwaite, Vernon, and Spring, and guest musicians Simon Hinkler, Bricheno, and Julianne Regan. To coincide with the release, Mercury Records reissued the first three Mission albums as enhanced CDs, complete with bonus tracks.

In February–March 2008, the band played a tour of Europe that culminated in a series of four concerts at Shepherd's Bush Empire in London, with each night dedicated to a particular period of the band's history. Hussey announced that these would be the last ever Mission concerts, as he wished to have an indefinite break from band activity and concentrate on other personal projects. Simon Hinkler joined on each night for the encores and occasional songs during the main set. The final concert in the series was filmed, and each night recorded and later released as part of a box set.

In February 2009, the Mission's record label SPV GmbH released a double album, Live & Last, plus the DVD Final Chapter recording of the final show, which included additional footage from the tour. The DVD debuted in the official UK BBC charts at No.6—the highest UK chart position in many years for the band. In June 2010, SPV released Dum Dum Bullet, a collection of recordings taken from the God Is a Bullet sessions.

=== Full circle ===
As the Mission's 25th anniversary was approaching, it was suggested to Hussey that he should reform the original lineup of the band. Hussey initially resisted, occupied with other projects. Eventually he was convinced, and in the summer of 2010, the announcement was made that with Craig Adams and Simon Hinkler on board, the Mission had reformed. Drummer Mick Brown had passed on the invitation to join and Spear of Destiny's Mike Kelly took his place.

In contrast to previous incarnations, the band only played material from the 1986–1990 period. In October 2011, they played a warm-up show as their alter ego, Blood Brothers, in Hussey's hometown of Bristol, before embarking on the XXV UK/European tour that culminated in a sold-out show at the Brixton Academy. This performance and an earlier one in Cologne was captured on film and released as Silver, together with an audio recording from the Frankfurt show.

Revitalised, the band decided to continue touring and played shows in South America, Mexico, Europe, and on the Download Festival in 2012. They also added a rendition of "All Along the Watchtower" to their repertoire. In September 2012, they supported the Cult on a tour of the UK, which attracted some controversy.

In October 2012, Hussey announced that "The Mission are gonna be recording a new album next year. The band are spending time right now writing new songs and will convene to a rehearsal room near Bristol in early April to start working on these new songs together". He also revealed that David M. Allen would be producing. The Brightest Light was released in September 2013, and the band embarked on a tour in support around North America, Germany, and the UK. In 2014, the Mission returned to South America for a nine-date tour.

In May 2016, Hussey confirmed Tim Palmer as producer for the band's tenth studio album. They promised a return to their 'classic' sound, and soon the album—titled Another Fall from Grace—was made available to pre-order online. On 12 August, the Mission pre-released the album's lead single, "Met-Amor-Phosis", through YouTube, eventually made available for download on 1 September.

In October 2016, the group embarked on a 30th-Anniversary tour with 28 shows across Europe, three in Australia, and two in New Zealand, to coincide with the release of Another Fall from Grace on 30 September; the album entered the UK album charts at No. 38.

The band continued to tour in support of Another Fall from Grace into 2017. The tour culminated in a headline set at Wave-Gotik-Treffen. Shortly after this, Wayne Hussey announced via Facebook that the band would be taking a break, with no definite plans in place for the near future. The Mission supported Alice Cooper in November 2017. Again via social media, Hussey announced that he would be spending much of 2018 working on his autobiography, scheduled for release in 2019.

The Mission embarked on their United European Party Tour in early 2020. This was cut short due to the COVID-19 outbreak, however, and rescheduled for 2021. The near-150 date world tour finished with five consecutive dates in the UK, in October 2023.

== Names and aliases ==
Initially known as the Sisterhood, the band was forced to change their name after Andrew Eldritch claimed it. After some deliberation, the Mission was chosen. Hussey claimed that the name was a reference to the proselytising mission that was part of his Mormon upbringing. Mick Brown has a different account, saying the name came from his favourite brand of speakers, Mission. When the band planned to tour the US in 1987, it was found that a Philadelphia R&B band had already claimed the name and thus the band was thereafter known in the United States as The Mission UK.

Throughout their existence, the group have used aliases to play smaller gigs, including Blood Brothers. In the 1989–1990 period, they formed a glam rock cover band, the Metal Gurus.

== Band members ==
- Wayne Hussey – guitars, lead vocals, keyboards, piano (1986–1996, 1999–2008, 2011–present)
- Craig Adams – bass, backing vocals (1986–1992, 1999–2002, 2011–present)
- Simon Hinkler – guitars, keyboards (1986–1990, 2011–present)
- Alex Baum – drums (2022–present)

== Discography ==
- God's Own Medicine (1986)
- Children (1988)
- Carved in Sand (1990)
- Masque (1992)
- Neverland (1995)
- Blue (1996)
- Aura (2001)
- God Is a Bullet (2007)
- The Brightest Light (2013)
- Another Fall from Grace (2016)
