= Craig Adams (musician) =

English musician

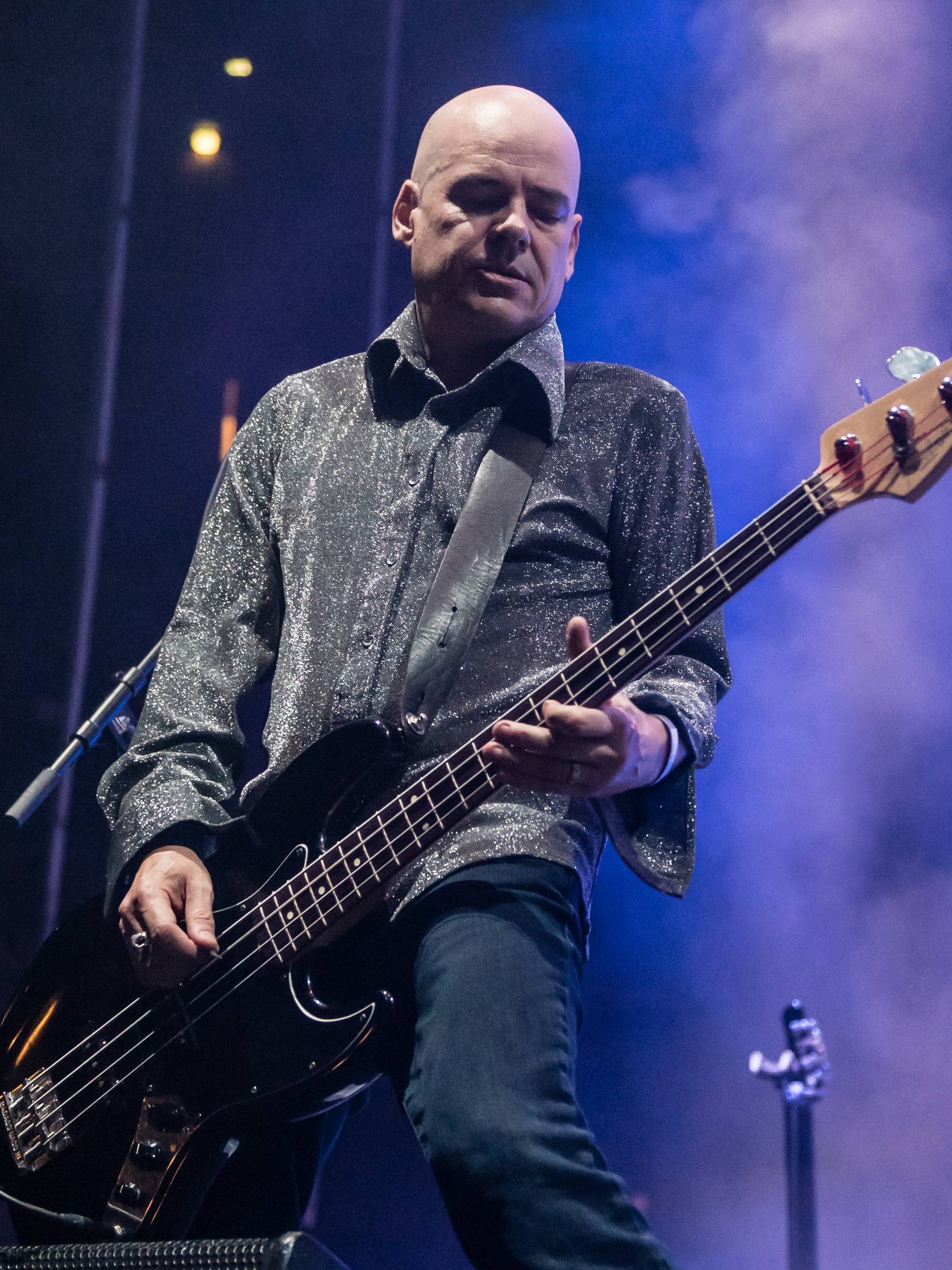
- Adams performing with The Mission in 2015

Background information
- Born: 4 April 1962 (age 64); Otley, West Riding of Yorkshire, England
- Genres: Post punk; gothic rock; alternative rock; hard rock
- Occupations: Musician; songwriter; record producer
- Instrument: Bass guitar
- Member of: The Mission; Spear of Destiny
- Formerly of: Sisters of Mercy; The Alarm; The Cult; Theatre of Hate

Craig David Adams (born 4 April 1962) is an English musician, bass guitarist and songwriter. Over his career he has worked with a variety of rock bands, the most notable being the Sisters of Mercy and the Mission.

== Biography ==
Craig David Adams was born in Otley, Yorkshire, on 4 April 1962, and was brought up in Leeds. Adams left school to pursue a career in music and initially played keyboards in a local band the Expelairs, who released a handful of singles. He left the five-piece due to musical differences and took up bass. Inspired by Motörhead he began to channel his bass through distortion effects. After a short conversation in a local pub with Andrew Eldritch he joined The Sisters of Mercy. Here Adams developed his songwriting abilities, contributing mainly to arrangements and using his higher ranged voice for backing vocals which contrasted with Eldritch's melancholic baritone.

When Adams and Hussey tired of the way that the Sisters of Mercy worked, they left and together they formed the Mission (initially the Sisterhood). Adams recorded four albums with the band and two compilations. As one of the co-founders, Adams' presence was pivotal in its success although his occasionally destructive behaviour brought a level of instability to the line-up. During the first tour of North America, Adams broke his hand while punching the window of the bus and was forced to return to the UK to recover. During the 'Deliverance' tour of 1990 guitarist Simon Hinkler left, signalling serious problems within the band. After the release of the 1992 album Masque, Adams was sacked, with the press reporting Hussey citing personal differences as the main motivation. In the biographical book about The Mission, Names Are For Tombstones, Baby, it states that they were on good terms personally, but that they were going in opposite directions musically.

Adams was recruited by Billy Duffy in 1993 to play bass with the Cult on a European tour. The two had first met when the Sisterhood, including Adams, had opened for the Cult throughout Europe in January and February 1986. Adams stayed with the Cult to record the Cult album in 1994 with producer Bob Rock, and toured extensively throughout Europe, and North and South America. His time with the Cult ended when the group disbanded in March 1995. He temporarily rejoined the Cult for a handful of dates in the United States, in October 2002.

Adams collaborated with Duffy again in 1998, forming Coloursound with Duffy, Mike Peters and Scott Garrett, who had also played with the Cult at the same time as Adams. Coloursound released one self-titled album in 1999, on Peters' own 21st Century Records.

Adams continued with Peters in several touring versions of the Alarm 1999–2005, and played on their 2004 album In the Poppy Fields, produced by Steve Brown.

In 2006, Adams was recruited by Kirk Brandon to join post-punk group Spear of Destiny, playing on several releases, including Imperial Prototype (2007), Omega Point (2010) and 31 (2014). Adams has also contributed to Brandon's other ongoing touring project, Theatre of Hate.

In 2012 Adams released the album Demon King, produced by Mike Kelly.

In 2014, Adams collaborated with Cuban American dark cabaret singer Voltaire in his tenth album, Raised by Bats.

== Bands ==
- The Expelaires (1980)
- The Sisters of Mercy (1981–1985)
- The Mission (1985–1992, 1999–2002, 2011–present)
- The Cult (1993–1995, 2002)
- Coloursound (1998–present) with Mike Peters of the Alarm and Billy Duffy of the Cult
- The Alarm (2003–2017)
- Theatre of Hate (2007)
- Spear of Destiny (2006–present)
