= All About Eve discography =

- Studio albums: 4
- EPs: 4
- Live albums: 6
- Compilation albums: 7
- Singles: 18
- Video albums: 3

This is the discography of English rock band All About Eve.

== Albums ==
=== Studio albums ===
Title	Album details	Peak chart positions	Certifications
Title	Album details	UK	Certifications
All About Eve	Released: 15 February 1988; Label: Mercury; Formats: CD, LP, MC	7	UK: Gold
Scarlet and Other Stories	Released: 16 October 1989; Label: Mercury; Formats: CD, LP, MC	9	UK: Gold
Touched by Jesus	Released: 26 August 1991; Label: Vertigo; Formats: CD, LP, MC	17	
Ultraviolet	Released: 26 October 1992; Label: MCA; Formats: CD, LP, MC	46	

=== Live albums ===
Alongside these official live albums, naturally there exist numerous live bootleg recordings; the most well known of which is Blessed by Angels, released in 1992 by Italy-based label Kiss the Stone. It comprises eleven tracks from 1988 to 1991, several of which were later included on the compilation Keepsakes – A Collection.

Title	Album details
Live at Brixton Academy	Released: 1989; Label: Self-released; Formats: MC; Limited fan club-only release
BBC Radio One Live in Concert	Released: October 1993; Label: Windsong International; Formats: CD
Fairy Light Nights – Live Acoustic (Note: Has also been re-released under the titles Unplugged, Martha's Harbour and What Kind of Fool.)	Released: 12 June 2000; Label: Yeaah!; Formats: CD
Fairy Light Nights Two – Live Acoustic	Released: 5 May 2001; Label: Jamtart; Formats: CD
Live and Electric at the Union Chapel	Released: 8 October 2001; Label: Jamtart; Formats: CD, 2xCD
Cinemasonic	Released: April 2003; Label: Jamtart; Formats: CD

=== Compilation albums ===
Title	Album details	Peak chart positions
Title	Album details	UK
Winter Words – Hits and Rarities	Released: 26 October 1992; Label: Mercury; Formats: CD, MC	—
The Best of All About Eve	Released: July 1999; Label: Spectrum Music; Formats: CD	—
Return to Eden Vol. 1 – The Early Recordings	Released: 8 July 2002; Label: Jamtart; Formats: CD	—
Acoustic Nights	Released: July 2003; Label: Recall 2cd; Formats: 2xCD; Re-packaging of the two Fairy Light Nights albums	—
Keepsakes – A Collection	Released: 13 March 2006; Label: Mercury; Formats: 2xCD, 2xCD+DVD	134
Sixty Minutes With	Released: 26 March 2007; Label: Voiceprint; Formats: CD	—
Paradise	Released: 19 June 2012; Label: N/A; Formats: digital download	—
"—" denotes releases that did not chart.

=== Video albums ===
Title	Album details
Evergreen	Released: 12 May 1989; Label: PolyGram Music Video; Formats: VHS
Cinemasonic	Released: April 2003; Label: Candytree; Formats: DVD
Live in Bonn 1991	Released: October 2008; Label: Voiceprint; Formats: DVD

== EPs ==
Title	Album details	Peak chart positions
Title	Album details	UK
Demo	Released: 1986; Label: Self-released; Formats: MC	—
13	Released: 18 February 1991; Label: Mercury; Formats: CD, MC	—
Phased	Released: 28 September 1992; Label: MCA; Formats: CD, MC, 7", 10"	38
Iceland	Released: 2 December 2002; Label: Jamtart; Formats: CD	—
"—" denotes releases that did not chart.

== Singles ==
Title	Year	Peak chart positions			Album
Title	Year	UK	UK Indie	IRE	Album
"D for Desire"	1985	—	—	—	Non-album singles
"In the Clouds"	1986	—	31	—	Non-album singles
"Our Summer"	1987	87	2	—	Non-album singles
"Flowers in Our Hair"	1987	81	1	—	All About Eve
"In the Clouds" (re-recording)	1988	47	—	—	All About Eve
"Wild Hearted Woman"	1988	33	—	—	All About Eve
"Every Angel"	1988	30	—	—	All About Eve
"Martha's Harbour"	1988	10	—	23	All About Eve
"What Kind of Fool"	1988	29	—	24	All About Eve
"Road to Your Soul"	1989	37	—	—	Scarlet and Other Stories
"December"	1989	34	—	—	Scarlet and Other Stories
"Scarlet"	1990	34	—	—	Scarlet and Other Stories
"Farewell Mr. Sorrow"	1991	36	—	—	Touched by Jesus
"Strange Way"	1991	37	—	—	Touched by Jesus
"The Dreamer"	1991	41	—	—	Touched by Jesus
"Some Finer Day"	1992	57	—	—	Ultraviolet
"Let Me Go Home"	2004	52	7	—	Non-album single
"Keepsakes"	2006	—	—	—	Keepsakes – A Collection
"—" denotes releases that did not chart or were not released in that territory.
