= Winter Words (album) =

1992 compilation album by All About Eve

Winter Words – Hits & Rareties

Compilation album by All About Eve
- Released: 26 October 1992
- Label: Mercury
- Producer: Paul Samwell-Smith; Wayne Hussey; Warne Liversey; All About Eve

All About Eve chronology
Ulraviolet (1992)	Winter Words – Hits & Rareties (1992)	(Seeing Stars) (1993)

Professional ratings
Review scores
Source	Rating
NME	6/10

Winter Words – Hits & Rareties is a compilation album by All About Eve, released in 1992 by the band's then-former record label Mercury, with whom they had had an acrimonious split one year earlier.

It contains two previously unreleased songs. Another similar compilation, The Best of All About Eve, was released in July 1999, although both have now been superseded by Keepsakes.

== Track listing – Winter Words ==
1. "Our Summer"
2. "Flowers In Our Hair"
3. "In the Clouds"
4. "Martha's Harbour"
5. "Every Angel"
6. "Wild Hearted Woman"
7. "What Kind of Fool"
8. "Road to Your Soul"
9. "Scarlet"
10. "December"
11. "Farewell Mr Sorrow"
12. "Strange Way"
13. "The Dreamer"
14. "Paradise"
15. "Candy Tree"
16. "Drowning"
17. "Wild Flowers"
18. "Theft" +
19. "Different Sky" +

+ New tracks previously unreleased.

Note

- "Theft" was mis-titled – apparently it should have been called "If I Had You".

The Best of All About Eve

Greatest hits album by All About Eve
- Released: July 1999
- Label: Mercury, Spectrum

All About Eve chronology
Winter Words (1992)	The Best of All About Eve (1999)	Fairy Light Nights (2000)

== Track listing – The Best of All About Eve ==
1. "Our Summer"
2. "Lady Moonlight"
3. "Flowers in Our Hair"
4. "Paradise"
5. "Gypsy Dance"
6. "In the Meadow"
7. "Every Angel"
8. "Martha's Harbour"
9. "What Kind of Fool"
10. "Gold and Silver"
11. "Candy Tree"
12. "Road to Your Soul"
13. "Tuesday's Child"
14. "Different Sky"
15. "Farewell Mr Sorrow"
16. "Wishing the Hours Away"
17. "Are You Lonely"
18. "Share It With Me"
