= Return to Eden, Vol. 1: The Early Recordings =

Compilation album by All About Eve
- Released: 5 November 2002
- Genre: Post-punk; gothic rock; dark wave; alternative rock
- Length: 65:50
- Label: JamTart

All About Eve chronology
Live and Electric at the Union Chapel (2001)	Return to Eden, Vol. 1: The Early Recordings (2002)	Iceland (2002)

Professional ratings
Review scores
Source	Rating
Allmusic	4/5 stars

Return to Eden, Vol. 1: The Early Recordings is a compilation by All About Eve released in early 2002 on their own JamTart label and widely sold at gigs at that time, though also it was (and still is) available to buy in shops and online. It was the fourth album released since the band's reformation in 1999.

As the title suggests, this compilation concerns itself with the songs which the band produced under its own Eden label prior to being signed by Mercury in 1987. As well as some unreleased demos, it includes all the A-sides and B-sides of their Eden label 7" and 12" singles, and the track "Suppertime": prior to the release of Return to Eden, this last track had only ever been released on a 'various artists' compilation entitled Gunfire and Pianos, put out in 1985 by ZigZag magazine and the record label Situation Two. As such, Return to Eden is of huge significance to All About Eve fans as it is the only place where all of these early (1985–87) works may be found, short of finding then buying each single individually. Most of the tracks had never before been released on CD.

== Track listing ==
1. "D for Desire" - 4:16
2. "Don't Follow Me (March Hare)" - 4:05
3. "Suppertime" - 3:10
4. "End of the Day" - 3:59
5. "Love Leads Nowhere" - 3:50
6. "In the Clouds" - 3:11
7. "Apple Tree Man" (demo version) - 4:04
8. "Shelter from the Rain" - 5:18
9. "Every Angel" (demo version) - 3:37
10. "In the Meadow" (demo version) - 4:32
11. "Our Summer" - 3:23
12. "Lady Moonlight" - 4:28
13. "Our Summer" (extended) - 4:28
14. "Flowers In Our Hair" - 4:07
15. "Paradise" - 3:52
16. "Devil Woman" - 2:58
17. "Flowers In Our Hair" (extended) - 5:12

== Notes ==
Most of these tracks feature the band's "classic" line-up of Julianne Regan (voice), Tim Bricheno (guitars) and Andy Cousin (bass), with a drum machine rather than a live drummer as original drummer Manuela Zwingmann left the band immediately after "D for Desire": she was not replaced full-time (by Mark Price) until their eponymous first album was nearly complete in 1988. The band re-recorded several tracks, with different musical arrangements, for this album.

While this album was being put together in 2002 Bricheno was recalled by the band in order to write the sleeve-notes, his first involvement with All About Eve since Scarlet and Other Stories in 1989.

A limited number of the CDs, signed by Regan, Cousin and Bricheno, were sold at live gigs.
