= Live in Bonn 1991 =

Live In Bonn 1991

Video by All About Eve
- Released: 2008
- Recorded: 1991
- Genre: Rock, Music Video
- Length: 60 minutes approx.
- Label: Jamtart

Live in Bonn 1991 is a concert DVD from the British alternative rock band All About Eve. The DVD comprises the full 5 September live concert at the Biskuithalle in Bonn, Germany, part of the band's 1991 European tour promoting their recently released album, Touched by Jesus. The footage was originally recorded for the German music television programme Rockpalast.

== Band personnel ==
The line-up for this concert comprises Julianne Regan (vocals), Andy Cousin (bass guitar), Mark Price (drums), recent addition Marty Willson-Piper (guitar and backing vocals) and Warne Livesey (keyboards). Livesey was not a full-time member of the band but became involved with them through producing Touched by Jesus and joined them for the tour in order to allow performance of some of the songs from this album.

== Track listing ==
1. "Strange Way" (listed as "Strangeway")
2. "Share It with Me"
3. "Wild Hearted Woman"
4. "Touched by Jesus"
5. "In the Clouds"
6. "Hide Child"
7. "Road to Your Soul"
8. "Farewell Mr. Sorrow"
9. "The Dreamer"
10. "Rhythm of Life"
11. "Every Angel"
12. "It's All Too Much"

The final song is a cover of the George Harrison-penned Beatles song, which originally appeared on their Yellow Submarine album.
