= Scarlet and Other Stories =

Studio album by All About Eve
- Released: 16 October 1989
- Label: Mercury, Phonogram
- Producer: Paul Samwell-Smith, All About Eve

All About Eve chronology
All About Eve (1988)	Scarlet and Other Stories (1989)	Touched by Jesus (1991)

Professional ratings
Review scores
Source	Rating
AllMusic	3.5/5 stars
Record Mirror	2/5 stars

Scarlet and Other Stories is the second studio album by All About Eve. It was held to be considerably darker both in tone and lyrics than their first album, All About Eve. The relationship between lead singer Julianne Regan and guitarist Tim Bricheno broke down during the album's recording and production, and Regan later said that she hadn't wept as much in her life as she had during the making of this album.

Scarlet and Other Stories reached No. 9 in the UK charts with three Top 40 singles resulting from it. The album spent 4 weeks in the UK top 100 album charts, and is certified Gold with in excess of 100,000 units being sold.

== Track listing ==
Bold indicates a single release (with UK chart position).
All songs written and composed by Tim Bricheno, Andy Cousin, Mark Price and Julianne Regan except where noted.

1. **"Road to Your Soul" (37)**
2. "Dream Now" (Bricheno, Cousin, Regan)
3. "Gold and Silver"
4. **"Scarlet" (34)** (Bricheno, Cousin, Regan)
5. **"December" (34)**
6. "Blind Lemon Sam" (Bricheno, Cousin, Regan)
7. "More Than the Blues"
8. "Tuesday's Child"
9. "Pieces of Our Heart" (Bricheno, Cousin, Regan)
10. "Hard Spaniard"
11. "The Empty Dancehall"
12. "Only One Reason"
13. "The Pearl Fishermen" (Bricheno, Cousin, Regan)

== Notes ==
This was the last album by All About Eve to feature Tim Bricheno on guitars until Keepsakes seventeen years later. He was replaced in time for their third album Touched by Jesus by Church guitarist Marty Willson-Piper.

== Re-issue ==
Scarlet and Other Stories was re-released in 2015 as a two disc format and audio download, as part of Universal UMC "Re-Presents" series.

=== Disc One ===
1. Road to Your Soul
2. Dream Now
3. Gold and Silver
4. Scarlet
5. December
6. Blind Lemon Sam
7. More Than the Blues
8. Tuesday's Child
9. Pieces of Our Heart
10. Hard Spaniard
11. The Empty Dancehall
12. Only One Reason
13. The Pearl Fishermen
14. Road to Your Soul (extended version)
15. December (Narnia Mix)
16. Drowning
17. The Witch's Promise
18. Paradise (89 Remix)

Re-issues notes for disc one: tracks 1, 3, 5, 7, 8, 10, 11, 12, 14, 15 & 16 by Bricheno, Cousin, Regan, Price (as on song listing [i.e. not alphabetical]); tracks 2, 4, 6, 9, 13 & 18 by Bricheno, Cousin, Regan; track 17 by Ian Anderson is a Jethro Tull cover.

=== Disc two ===
1. Theft (If I Had You)
2. Different Sky
3. The Dreamer
4. Our Summer (live in Hammersmith, 1989)
5. Candy Tree (live in Hammersmith, 1989)
6. Tuesday's Child (live in Hammersmith, 1989)
7. In the Clouds (live in Glasgow, 1991)
8. Never Promise (Anyone Forever) (live in Glasgow, 1991)
9. Scarlet (live in Glasgow, 1991)
10. More Than the Blues (live in Glasgow, 1991)
11. Road to Your Soul (live in Glasgow, 1991)
12. The Pearl Fishermen (live on BBC Saturday Sequence, 14 September 1989)
13. Blind Lemon Sam (live BBC Saturday Sequence, 14 September 1989)
14. The Empty Dancehall (live on the BBC's Richard Skinner Show, 1 October 1989)
15. December (live on the BBC's Richard Skinner Show, 1 October 1989)
16. The Pearl Fishermen (live on the BBC's Richard Skinner Show, 1 October 1989)
17. Only One Reason (live at Glastonbury, 1989)

Re-issue notes for disc two: tracks 1 & 2 by All About Eve. Tracks 4, 5, 6, 7, 8, 9, 12, 13, & 16 by Bricheno, Cousin, Regan; tracks 10, 11, 14 & 15 by Bricheno, Cousin, Regan, Price; track 3 by Cousin, Regan, Price, Willson-Piper; track 3 first appeared on the third All About Eve album, Touched by Jesus.

== Personnel ==
All About Eve

- Julianne Regan – vocals, keyboards (tracks 1, 4)
- Tim Bricheno – guitars, keyboards (1), banjo (7)
- Andy Cousin – bass, keyboards (5)
- Mark Price – drums, percussion

Additional personnel

- Caroline Lavelle – cello (3, 8)
- Paul Samwell-Smith – keyboards (5, 10), backing vocals (6)
- Ric Sanders – violin (7, 11)

== Extended links ==
- Scarlet and Other Stories at Discogs (list of releases)
