= Adoration (band) =

Anglo-Irish gothic rock band

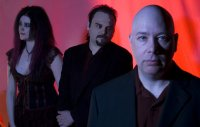

Background information
- Origin: United Kingdom
- Genres: Gothic rock, ethereal wave
- Years active: 2003–2012
- Labels: Soma-Rosa
- Members: John Stone; Stephen Carey; Lee-Anne Burgess; Rob Leydon; Chris Milden; Simon Rippin

Adoration (also known as Adoration UK) were an English band formed in 2003 by John Stone (vocals, former manager of band Vendemmian) and Stephen Carey (formerly of This Burning Effigy, NFD and currently of the band The Eden House).

The band were musically influenced by the likes of The Cure, The Chameleons, Cocteau Twins and The Mission.

After an initial flurry of activity during which the band supported bands such as Red Lorry Yellow Lorry and a tour with All About Eve Adoration then spent 4 years in the studio to write and record their first album, with Lee-Anne Burgess joining them on bass in 2006.

Their debut album Sleepwaking was released in September 2008, distributed by Plastic Head.

With reviews by Steve Beebee from Kerrang!, Total Guitar and Sonic Seducer (also being on the cover CD) and Lee-Anne Burgess being interviewed by Joel McIvor in Bass Guitar Magazine, the album sold out of its first pressing very quickly.

With the addition of Chris Milden (of Lahannya) and Rob Leydon on guitars and Simon Rippin on drums the new line up made its live return to a sold out Dingwalls in London.

The band then went over to Europe to perform at the 2009 Wave-Gotik-Treffen in Leipzig Germany alongside I Like Trains and The Cranes before returning to the Whitby Gothic Weekend with Faith and the Muse. After a headline show at London's Camden underworld one review said "the band had decided to replicate Chartres Cathedral in sound".

Adoration went on to share the bill with the likes of The Birthday Massacre before they supported The Chameleons (now Chameleons Vox) at a sold out Islington 02 Academy where the band also shot the video for the single 'Sense'.

The band split in April 2012 and played their farewell gig at the Islington O2 Academy in London.

== Members ==
John Stone - vocals
Stephen Carey - guitar, keyboards
Lee-Anne Burgess - bass
Rob Leydon - guitar
Chris Milden - guitar
Simon Rippin - drums

== Discography ==
=== Albums ===
- 2008: Sleepwalking (Soma-Rosa)

=== Singles ===
- 2011: "Sense" (iTunes)
