= Touched by Jesus =

Studio album by All About Eve
- Released: 26 August 1991
- Length: 52:17
- Label: Vertigo
- Producer: Warne Livesey

All About Eve chronology
Scarlet and Other Stories (1989)	Touched by Jesus (1991)	Ultraviolet (1992)

Professional ratings
Review scores
Source	Rating
Allmusic	3/5 stars

Touched by Jesus is the third studio album by All About Eve. It was the first album to feature Church guitarist Marty Willson-Piper on guitars. Despite this, the album fell short of the commercial achievements of both the first album and Scarlet and Other Stories, reaching No. 17 in the UK charts.

== Track listing ==
All music written by Cousin, Price, Regan, and Willson-Piper, except "Are You Lonely" written by Cousin, Livesey, Price, Regan, and Willson-Piper. All lyrics written by Julianne Regan except "Hide Child" written by Marty Willson-Piper.

Bold type indicates a single release (with chart position).

1. **"Strange Way" (51)**
2. **"Farewell Mr. Sorrow" (36)**
3. "Wishing the Hours Away"
4. "Touched by Jesus"
5. **"The Dreamer" (41)**
6. "Share It with Me"
7. "Rhythm of Life"
8. "The Mystery We Are"
9. "Hide Child"
10. "Ravens"
11. "Are You Lonely"

== Personnel ==
- Andy Cousin - bass
- Mark Price - percussion, drums
- Julianne Regan - voice
- Marty Willson-Piper - electric and acoustic guitars, mandolin
- Warne Livesey - keyboards, production, string arrangements
- David Gilmour - additional guitar on "Wishing the Hours Away" and "Are You Lonely"
- Gavyn Wright - violin on "Ravens"
- The Astarti String Orchestra led by Gavin Wright

== Notes ==
Marty Willson-Piper remained a full-time member of The Church during both his periods with All About Eve, in spite of the fact that the former is based in Australia and the latter in the UK.

"Are You Lonely" and "Wishing the Hours Away" both featured guest-guitarist David Gilmour from Pink Floyd.

"Farewell Mr Sorrow" and "Strange Way" were both aimed at former guitarist Tim Bricheno, who left the band in 1990 following a break-up of his relationship with singer Julianne Regan.

Some versions of the single release of "Farewell Mr Sorrow" included a cover "Silver Song", originally by Mellow Candle, as a B-side.

The perceived failure of this album would lead to an acrimonious break-up between the band and their record company, causing them to sign to MCA for their next album, Ultraviolet.
