= Toni Haimi =

Finnish guitarist

Toni Haimi is a Finnish guitarist originally from Hamina, Finland. As Toni Sailor he is the current guitarist of British electronica band Sohodolls, which he joined in 2004.

== All About Eve ==
He was a guitarist with All About Eve, which he joined in the Spring of 2002 after the departure of Marty Willson-Piper earlier in that year. He remained with the band until their 2004 split. With All About Eve, he is most apparent on their album/video release Cinemasonic and he was also guitarist on their latest single "Let Me Go Home". He did not play any part in the album Iceland as this was an entirely Regan/Cousin endeavour.

== Early career ==
Prior to All About Eve he was a member of Nozzle (since 2001) and before that he was a founder member of British indie rockers Malluka. He started out in his native Finland with Lowdown Shakin' Chills, which he joined 1991. Lowdown Shakin' Chills made two albums to Hiljaiset Levyt.
