= Cinemasonic =

Live album by All About Eve
- Released: March 2003
- Label: JamTart
- Producer: All About Eve

All About Eve chronology
Iceland (2002)	Cinemasonic (2003)	Keepsakes (2006)

Professional ratings
Review scores
Source	Rating
Allmusic	3/5 stars

Cinemasonic is a live album by All About Eve. It was released both as a CD and as a DVD and is a recording of the band's gig on 31 May 2002 at the Shepherd's Bush Empire.

== Track listing (CD) ==
1. "Let Me Go Home" (Andy Cousin, Julianne Regan) – 3:56
2. "The Dreamer" (Cousin, Rod Price, Regan, Marty Willson-Piper) – 3:45
3. "Somebody Said" (Rik Carter, Cousin, Regan) – 4:27
4. "Blue Sonic Boy" (Tim McTighe, Regan) – 6:09
5. "Daisychains" (Carter, Cousin, Regan) – 6:01
6. "I Don't Know" (Cousin, Regan) – 4:25
7. "Phased" (Cousin, Price, Regan, Willson-Piper) – 4:32
8. "Ctrl-Alt-Delete" (Carter, Cousin, Regan) – 4:06
9. "Sodium" (Cousin, Regan) – 4:43
10. "Touched by Jesus" (Cousin, Price, Regan, Willson-Piper) – 10:16
11. "Life on Mars?" (David Bowie) – 5:03

== Track listing (DVD) ==
As well as a video recording of the concert, the DVD also contains a mini-feature called "Access all Areas", which is a fifteen-minute backstage look at the concert and the tour as a whole.

1. "Let Me Go Home"
2. "The Dreamer"
3. "Flowers in Our Hair"
4. "In the Clouds"
5. "Somebody Said"
6. "Blue Sonic Boy"
7. "Daisychains"
8. "I Don't Know"
9. "Phased"
10. "Ctrl-Alt-Delete"
11. "Sodium"
12. "Wishing the Hours Away"
13. "Make it Bleed"
14. "Outshine the Sun"
15. "Every Angel"
16. "Life on Mars?"
17. "Our Summer"
18. "Touched by Jesus"

== Personnel ==
- Julianne Regan - vocals
- Andy Cousin - bass guitar
- Toni Haimi - lead guitar
- Rik Carter - keyboards and guitars
- Del Hood - drums
