= Jules et Jim (band) =

English-Belgian musical duo

Jules et Jim was a musical collaboration consisting of Jean-Marc Lederman (of The Weathermen) and Julianne Regan (of All About Eve).

== Discography ==
=== Singles ===
- Swimming CD1 (1999)
1. "Swimming" (Single Edit)
2. "Only a Fool" (Underwater Mix)
- Swimming CD2 (1999)
1. "Swimming" (Single Edit)
2. "Only a Fool" (Radio Mix)
3. "Swimming" (Plastic Boat Mix)
4. "Only a Fool" (Underwater Mix)
- Lounge Musix I (promotional cd given away free with the fruit juices Looza)
1. "Only a Fool" (Underwater Mix)
2. "Infinity & Beyond" (Instrumental)
3. "If Life Were a Movie" (Remix)
4. "Sylvia" (Original Mix)

=== EPs ===
- Subtitles (2001)
1. "If Life Were a Movie"
2. "What Are the Chances?"
3. "I Only Have Eyes for You"
4. "It’s a Beautiful World"
5. "Sylvia"
6. "Queen Kerosene"

=== Albums ===
The above Subtitles and "Swimming" releases were also repackaged as a downloadable album on various online download music stores, except for the track "I Only Have Eyes for You":

- Subtitles and More (2009)
1. "Swimming"
2. "If Life Were a Movie"
3. "What are the Chances?"
4. "Sylvia"
5. "Only a Fool"
6. "It’s a Beautiful World"
7. "What are the Chances?" (Fairies Mix)
8. "Swimming" (Plastic Boat Mix)
9. "Only a Fool" (Underwater Mix)
10. "Queen Kerosene"

Then another re-release:

- Synchronised (2019), as above with additional tracks:
1. "Ms. Jones"
2. "I Only Have Eyes for You" (re-added track)

=== Other releases ===
The band have also released a number of other tracks through their (now defunct) website:

- "What Are the Chances?" (Ballad Mix)
- "Brass" (Instrumental)
- "Laidback & the Kid" (Instrumental)

== Collaborations ==
The duo have also collaborated on a number of other projects together.

Regan has contributed vocals to game soundtrack music composed by Lederman. Games include Mystic Inn, Fairies and Kudos: Rock Legend. The soundtrack from Fairies was released as a downloadable single with the following tracks:

1. "Fairies Theme"
2. "The Castle"
3. "The Forest"
4. "Time"
5. "The Plains"
6. "Zen"
7. "Chances EMO"

Their most recent collaboration is on Lederman's La Femme Verte covers project. Regan has contributed vocals to a number of tracks on the album Small Distortions (original recording artists in brackets):

- "Hurt" (Nine Inch Nail)
- "Falling" (Angelo Badalamenti/Julee Cruise)
- "Moonlight Mile" (Rolling Stones)
- "Being Boring" (Pet Shop Boys)
- "Monday Monday" (The Mamas & the Papas)
