= New and Improved =

New and Improved may refer to:

- New and Improved (Mice album), 2001
- New and Improved (The Spinners album), 1974

== See also ==
- New! Improved!, 1969 album by Blue Cheer
