= Ribbed Music for the Numb Generation =

Studio album by Sohodolls
- Released: 24 September 2007
- Recorded: 2004–2006; Cornwall and London
- Genres: Synthpop; electropunk; electronic rock; glam rock; alternative rock
- Length: 40:52
- Label: Filthy Pretty
- Producers: Robert Harder; Steve Lyon; Toni Sailor; Sohodolls; Andy Wright

Sohodolls chronology
Ribbed Music for the Numb Generation (2007)	Mayday EP (2014)

Japanese cover

Singles from Ribbed Music for the Numb Generation
- 1. "Prince Harry" Released: 15 November 2004; 2. "Stripper" Released: 4 July 2005; 3. "No Regrets" Released: 30 October 2006; 4. "Right and Right Again" Released: 3 September 2007; 5. "Bang Bang Bang Bang" Released: 19 February 2021

Ribbed Music for the Numb Generation is the first studio album by English electronic music band Sohodolls, released on 24 September 2007 by Filthy Pretty Records. The album was produced by Robert Harder (Babyshambles, the Sunshine Underground), with additional production by Steve Lyon (Depeche Mode, the Cure) and Harry Smith.

The songs "Stripper" and "I'm Not Cool" were used in seasons one and two of the American television series Gossip Girl, respectively. "Stripper" was also used in the ITV2 advert for the show's first season. "My Vampire" was used in the fifth season finale of the American drama series Nip/Tuck.

The album's name is a play on Music for the Jilted Generation, the second studio album by the Prodigy. The Sohodolls had previously used the title for a 3-song demo tape in 2004 containing early versions of "Prince Harry" and "Weekender" plus "Shut Your Pretty Mouth", an unreleased track that would later be used as the name of club nights hosted by Maya Von Doll in the late 2000s and early 2010s.

== Critical reception ==
Professional ratings
Review scores
Source	Rating
AbsolutePunk	87%
Gigwise	4/5 stars
MyVillage	4/5 stars
musicOMH	4/5 stars

Ribbed Music for the Numb Generation was well received by music critics. Jenni Cole of musicOMH described the album as "dark electro-glam of a lushness not heard since the synthtastic early '80s", comparing the band favourably to the Human League, Depeche Mode, Heaven 17 and Soft Cell. Cole added that "the music is brilliant. Upbeat, disco-tinged without being cheesy, taking all the best parts from glam and adding them to a Gothy, new century cabaret chic that no doubt translates brilliantly into live performance." Susan Frances of AbsolutePunk commented that the album "wraps you in fishnets of cabaret-styled vocals from lead singer Maya Von Doll and techno-dripping rhythms orchestrated by drummer Paul Stone and bassist Matt Lord. The barbed guitar riffs of Toni Sailor are perched in thickets of bristling keyboards from Weston Doll creating movements that expand and separate with a will of their own, alternating lean segments with thick froths while covered in Maya's femininely sweet vocal reams." She added that the music is "both street savvy and club chic, keeping away from falling into a mundane routine that often plagues synth-pop albums."

Chris Reynolds of Gigwise viewed Sohodolls as "a sleazy yet chic outfit comparable to Goldfrapp" and wrote that "Maya's vocals are seductive and the bass and synths are as smooth as can be", but felt that "the lack of variation ... detracts greatest from a fine debut. When stripped down this is simple pop music with an eighties edge and can become tiresome at points such as the lacklustre 'Trash the Rental'." Emily Kate Stephens of MyVillage concluded, "With a huge mix of influences Sohodolls travel through this album with a strength and grace that means you can't help but listen. They can look forwarded to awakening their followers' senses. From the first listen the album makes you want to catch their next gig."

== Track listing ==
All tracks are written by Sohodolls, except where noted.

No.	Title	Writer(s)	Length
1.	"Stripper"	Sohodolls; Karen Gibbs; Neville Henry	3:36
2.	"Prince Harry"		2:42
3.	"My Vampire"		3:36
4.	"Right and Right Again"		3:33
5.	"Trash the Rental"		3:05
6.	"I'm Not Cool"		2:55
7.	"Bang Bang Bang Bang"		3:01
8.	"The Rest for the Wicked"		4:01
9.	"Weekender"	Sohodolls; Laurie Mansworth	3:39
10.	"Pleasures of Soho"		2:55
11.	"No Regrets"		4:07
12.	"1724"		3:42

Japanese edition bonus tracks
No.	Title	Writer(s)	Length
13.	"Dead by Christmas" (Hanoi Rocks cover)	Andy McCoy	3:25
14.	"Trash the Rental" (Crystal Castles Remix)	Sohodolls	4:32

Music videos were filmed for "Stripper", "Bang Bang Bang Bang", "Right and Right Again" and "Pleasures of Soho".

== Personnel ==
Credits adapted from the liner notes of Ribbed Music for the Numb Generation.

Sohodolls

- Sohodolls – production (track 8)
- Maya von Doll – vocals
- Weston Doll – keyboards
- Matt Lord – bass
- Toni Sailor – guitar (all tracks); production (track 12)
- Paul Stone – drums

Additional personnel

- Dave Blair – assistant engineering (track 1)
- Nicholas Fowler – additional guitar (track 2)
- Martin Giles – mastering
- Robert Harder – production (tracks 1–7, 9–11); mixing (tracks 2, 10)
- Tomi Lahdesmaki – artwork, design
- Steve Lyon – additional production (track 11); mixing (tracks 1, 3–9, 11, 12)
- Emma Tempest – band photography
- Andy Wright – additional production (track 1)

== Release history ==
Region	Date	Label
United Kingdom	24 September 2007	Filthy Pretty Records
Japan	6 August 2008	Yoshimoto R and C
