= Nozzle (band) =

Nozzle is a British guitar-based rock band from Devon, England, formed in 1995 by guitarist and songwriter Dave Blomberg, formerly with the English band New Model Army. Later it also featured members of All about Eve, Pressgang and Asylum.

== History ==
Nozzle's first album called Winter was released on German independent label Viking Records in 2001 by the line up featuring Dave Blomberg (vocals and guitar), James Davis (drums), Matt Round (bass guitar) and Danny Vuckovic (guitar). It was described by the press as "a lush combination of rock guitars with a dynamic rhythm section, melodic vocals and dark, moody atmospherics" and received favourable reviews in the some European music magazines (Zillo, Orkus, Metal Hammer and others). While working on the album, Nozzle played a series of dates in Europe which included appearing at the Nom Del Rock Festival in Palestrina near Rome in Italy and a successful headline tour in Germany in 1999.

Nozzle's second album Twisted Vision, recorded live in the studio, was released in September 2004 on New Model Army's label Attack Attack Records, distributed in Europe through Rough Trade. This line up was Dave Blomberg along with Michael Dean from New Model Army on drums, All about Eve and soho dolls' guitarist Toni Haimi on guitar and John Forrester on bass formerly of Pressgang and The Colour Mary.

In September 2005, Nozzle were signed by Jac Holzman to Warner Music's label Cordless Recordings in the United States. The band released two EPs, the Mystery EP 2005 and the Let Me Down EP (2006). Whilst with Cordless Recordings one of Nozzle's songs "Fatal Beauty" featured as part of the soundtrack for Nicholas DiBella's American independent film Cherry Crush, a drama/thriller film starring Jonathan Tucker and Nikki Reed.

Nozzle, featuring Dave Blomberg on guitar and vocals, Leigh Winsor on bass guitar and Joe Breban on drums, released their third album Empires in May 2008 on their own Flowermountain Records label.
