= Martha's Harbour =

1988 single by All About Eve

Single by All About Eve

from the album All About Eve
- B-side: "Another Door"
- Released: 18 July 1988
- Length: 3:08
- Label: Mercury; Phonogram
- Songwriters: Tim Bricheno; Andy Cousin; Julianne Regan
- Producer: Paul Samwell-Smith

All About Eve singles chronology
"Every Angel" (1988)	"Martha's Harbour" (1988)	"What Kind of Fool" (1988)

"Martha's Harbour" is a song by English rock band All About Eve. The acoustic ballad reached No. 10 on the UK Singles Chart and helped the group's self-titled debut album reach No. 7 on the UK Albums Chart. The song features only Julianne Regan's voice, acoustic guitars played by Tim Bricheno, and sound effects of ocean waves.

== Background ==
On its creation, Julianne Regan has said, in an interview on BBC radio, "This song happened by accident when we were recording the first album. It was one of those things when we had the day off and we were sat in this very idyllic setting beneath a willow tree besides a stream by this beautiful residential recording studio and it just came out so naturally. It was a miracle of a little song and it's very dear to us because of that, because it was very pure, a really happy accident. Everybody went to the pub and we put it down and by the time they got back Martha's Harbour was committed to tape. Martha's Harbour is a fictitious backdrop for this happening."

== Top of the Pops performance ==
The song is well known for an incident on 4 August 1988 during a live edition of the popular BBC UK music show Top of the Pops, when the group, ready to do a mimed (as was BBC policy at the time) performance of their hit, were not played the backing track through their monitors, so they sat motionless while the television audience could hear the song. Due to this error on the part of the BBC, the band were invited back the following week on 11 August, (the song having climbed the chart), and they performed the song live.

== Track listings ==
7-inch single

A. "Martha's Harbour"
B. "Another Door"

UK 12-inch single

A1. "Martha's Harbour"
A2. "Another Door"
B1. "In the Meadow" (live)

UK and European CD single

1. "Martha's Harbour" – 3:10
2. "Another Door" – 3:26
3. "Wild Flowers" – 3:51
4. "She Moves Through the Fair" – 5:21

UK cassette single

1. "Martha's Harbour"
2. "Another Door"
3. "Never Promise (Anyone Forever)" (live)
4. "In the Meadow" (live)

European 5-inch CD Video single

1. "Martha's Harbour" – 3:07
2. "Like Emily" – 5:16
3. "Another Door" – 3:26
4. "She Moves Through the Fair" – 5:05
5. "Martha's Harbour" (video) – 3:23

== Credits and personnel ==
Credits are lifted from the UK 7-inch single sleeve.

- Julianne Regan – writing, vocals
- Tim Bricheno – writing, acoustic guitar
- Andy Cousin – writing
- Paul Samwell-Smith – production
- Tony Phillips – engineering
- Stylorouge – artwork design
- Simon Fowler – photography

== Charts ==
Chart (1988)	Peak position
Europe (Eurochart Hot 100)	34
Ireland (IRMA)	23
UK Singles (Official Charts)	10
