= Seeing Stars (band/album) =

Studio album by Seeing Stars
- Released: 1993 (recorded), 1997, 1999
- Studio: Wapley Barn
- Genre: Alternative rock
- Labels: Border Music, Heyday
- Producer: Seeing Stars

Seeing Stars was the only album by the band Seeing Stars. It was essentially intended to be the fifth studio album by UK band All About Eve. In the aftermath of the Ultraviolet album's release – its mediocre reception and lost recording contract – whilst this album was being recorded in early 1993, lead singer Julianne Regan left the writing and recording session.

The remaining members of the group, Andy Cousin (bass), Mark Price (drums), and Marty Willson-Piper (guitars and, on this record, lead vocals), continued their work on the album. It was released four years later on the Swedish Border Music label, as a limited pressing.

In 1999, following the reformation of All About Eve, renewed interest in the band saw a re-release of the album in a limited pressing of 500 copies. Nearly all of them were sold at All About Eve gigs during their Fairy Light Nights phase.

== Track listing ==
All tracks composed by Andy Cousin and Marty Willson-Piper, with Mark Price on tracks 1–5, 7–10

1. "Salome"
2. "I Can't Hate You"
3. "Where the Rainstorm Ends"
4. "Staring at the Sun"
5. "A Drink to Drift Away"
6. "Ugly and Cruel"
7. "Venus of Prose"
8. "Come"
9. "Mesmerized"
10. "Pendulum"

== Personnel ==
Seeing Stars

- Marty Willson-Piper - vocals, guitar
- Andy Cousin - bass, string arrangements
- Mark Price - drums

with:

- Anna Nyström - piano on "A Drink to Drift Away" and flute on "Ugly and Cruel"

== Notes ==
In addition to the Cousin/Price/Willson-Piper line-up, "A Drink to Drift Away" and "Ugly and Cruel" also featured Anna Nyström of The Lucy Nation on piano.

An earlier provisional title of the album was Never Swallow Stars.
