= Julianne Regan =

English-Irish singer, songwriter and musician

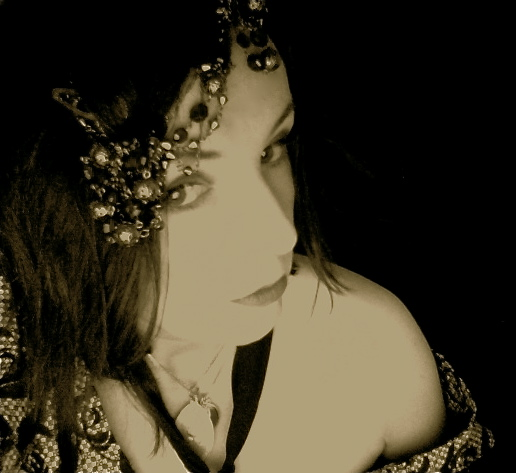
- Regan in 2006

Background information
- Born: Julie-Ann Regan; 30 June 1962 (age 64); Coventry, England
- Genre: Gothic rock
- Occupations: Musician, singer, songwriter, producer
- Instruments: Vocals, guitar, bass, keyboards
- Years active: 1981–present
- Website: www.julianneregan.co.uk

Julianne Regan (born 30 June 1962) is an English and Irish singer, songwriter, and musician. She was the lead singer and songwriter of the band All About Eve, which had four top-50 albums in the late 1980s and early 1990s. AllMusic describes Regan as "certainly one of the more talented singers of the late eighties British goth rock scene".

== Early life (1962–1981) ==
At the age of 15, Julianne Regan was given a Woolworths electric guitar by a cousin and taught herself to play.

== All About Eve (first era) (1985–1992) ==
The first line-up recorded the single "D For Desire" in 1985, but, following disagreements around artistic direction between Zwingmann and Regan, the former left the band. Soon after this, Andy Cousin replaced Jackson on bass, thus creating the first well-known All About Eve line-up of Bricheno, Cousin and Regan, plus a drum machine. The group recorded demos and played several gigs.

In 1986, Regan met ex-The Sisters of Mercy guitarist Wayne Hussey. Hussey was then recording the first Mission album God's Own Medicine and was so impressed with Regan's voice that he asked her to contribute backing vocals to the song "Severina". This started a close collaboration between the two bands that continues to this day, and at the time got All About Eve signed to the Mission's record label (on the back of them being support to the Mission's first tour and Regan appearing on several TV programmes with the Mission for performances of "Severina"). Regan also provides backing vocals on The Mission songs "Beyond The Pale," "Tomorrow Never Knows," "Black Mountain Mist," and "Wishing Well", which appears on the US version of their early-songs collection album The First Chapter. A full-time drummer Mark Price was recruited to All About Eve in 1987.

Following an appearance on the BBC television music programme Top of the Pops in August 1988, All About Eve soon had success with the first album and the single "Martha's Harbour" peaking within the top ten of the UK Albums Chart and UK Singles Chart respectively, along with four other top-forty hits on the latter chart between the summers of 1988 and 1989.

Bricheno left the band at the end of 1990 (and joined The Sisters of Mercy), to be replaced by Church guitarist Marty Willson-Piper for All About Eve's third album, Touched by Jesus, for which David Gilmour from Pink Floyd also contributed guitar work on two songs.

Touched By Jesus was less successful than the first two albums and All About Eve subsequently changed record labels to MCA in 1992. They recorded their fourth and final studio album Ultraviolet, which had a more psychedelic sound. This alienated fans, and the record did not make the Top 40. MCA dropped the band from their contract.

== Other projects (1993–1995) ==
Regan and the rest of the band parted company during the writing sessions for what might have been All About Eve's fifth album. Cousin, Price and Willson-Piper completed it without her, and it eventually saw the light of day under the group name and title of Seeing Stars. Under the group name The Harmony Ambulance, Regan did release one single very soon after the All About Eve split for Geoff Travis' Rough Trade label. The double A-side, "Nature's Way" and "All This And Heaven". Regan turned down an offer to work full-time with that band. She also recorded vocals for the Schaft track "Broken English".

Regan also occasionally performed live with Fairport Convention, singing some of the lead vocals on "Who Knows Where the Time Goes", "Blackwaterside", and "After Halloween". Some of these tracks can be found on the albums Circle Dance – The Hokey Pokey Charity Compilation, Fairport Convention: 25th Anniversary Concert, and Cropredy Capers – 25 Years of the Festival.

Regan then dropped off the public radar. A collaboration with Suede's Bernard Butler failed when the two fell out during the recording session. She later said "I don't really know why it exploded the way it did, but it did. It was a small thing that turned into a big thing, that turned into an enormous thing."

== Mice (1995–1997) ==
Revolving around a central core of Regan, Tim McTighe, former Levitation member Christian Hayes (aka 'Bic') and, for studio recordings, the original All About Eve drummer Mark Price, Mice released their first single, "Mat's Prozac", in November 1995, which charted in the UK. This was followed by a second UK charting EP single "The Milkman" released in April 1996 with the Lynsey De Paul song Martian Man. Countrywide touring followed as did an album Because I Can recorded for indie label Permanent Records. Many collaborators took part in this band, including both Marty Willson-Piper and Andy Cousin which led to people questioning why the band was not launched as another incarnation of All About Eve. Regan said that this was deliberate as she had wanted the new band to be musically different. Because I Can reached the Indie Top Ten, but Permanent Records went out of business in 1997, leaving the album and the three singles "Mat's Prozac", "The Milkman" and "Dear Sir" available in the shops but without promotion or replacement.

== Jules et Jim (1999–2001) ==
Jules et Jim is a collaboration between Regan and Jean-Marc Lederman (formerly of The Weathermen and Gene Loves Jezebel). In 1999 they released a single, "Swimming", followed by a six-track EP, Subtitles in 2002. Regan also featured on Lederman's soundtracks for the computer games Fairies and Mystic Inn by Funpause, and Rock Legend by Positech; and also vocals on a number of tracks on Lederman's La Femme Verte album project.

== All About Eve (second era) (1999–2006) ==
In late 1999 a Mission re-launch was underway and lead singer Hussey – in a repeat of the first time All About Eve had become successful – again asked Regan if she would like to support him on tour. Although she was already involved with Jules et Jim (who had put out an EP called Swimming earlier that year), Regan acquiesced, rounded up Price, Cousin and Wilson-Piper, and All About Eve were back.

When asked in 2001 why she had had a change of heart in terms of resurrecting All About Eve and their music, she replied:

I think I just really needed a break from it. It had lost its magic for me. Totally. Also, for some reason, I had to have a bit of a rebellion against AAE. Maybe it's something along the lines of why teenagers fall out with their parents and find everything about them embarrassing... Then they grow up a bit and realise that their Mum and Dad aren't too bad at all.

All About Eve became dormant again in mid-2004 following a disagreement between Regan and Cousin, but 2006 saw this rift temporarily healed upon the release of Keepsakes – an anthology of the group's recordings. This record saw the songwriting partnership between Regan and Bricheno rekindled, as they collaborated for a new song entitled "Raindrops".

== Later musical projects ==
Regan's official website states that she is "currently working on several music projects".

- Tim Bricheno – with whom she wrote and recorded the song "Raindrops", which appeared on the All About Eve retrospective collection Keepsakes. In 2008, the duo recorded a new version of "Ophelia", a song which had originally been demo-ed for the All About Eve album Scarlet and Other Stories, but was never released. The re-recording was made especially for inclusion on a charity record, 'Let There Be Life', released to raise funds for research into ovarian cancer. Regan also contributed a solo song, "The Angel's Share", to the same album. Their composition, Pale Blue Earth, was aired on YouTube on 20 July 2019, to coincide with the 50th anniversary of the first Moon landing. Subsequent compositions by the pair have appeared on Regan's YouTube channel. Regan & Bricheno released an album "Apparitions" on 3 May 2024 on Bandcamp.
- The Drowning Man – In July 2023, Regan contributed a cover of The Cure song 'The Drowning Man' for a charity album, with proceeds going to the mental health charity Mind. The album is called Pictures of You – A compilation of covers of songs by The Cure
- The Dadaists – Regan, with unnamed musicians / collaborators, uploaded a number of songs to YouTube under this name. The project features both male and female vocals.
- Wayne Hussey – Regan and Hussey co-wrote the song "Madam G" from the album Candlelight and Razorblades.
- The Mission – Regan sang backing vocals on the 2007 album God is a Bullet and on the album Another Fall from Grace.
- Le Cygne Noir – Regan sings backing vocals on several releases.
- All Living Fear – Regan contributed backing vocals on the track "Home Too Soon" from the 2007 album Fifteen Years After.
- The Eden House – A collaborative project, initiated by Tony Pettitt (formerly of Fields of the Nephilim) and Steve Carey (formerly of This Burning Effigy) and involving a collection of guest musicians and vocalists. Regan cowrote three tracks on the album Smoke & Mirrors, released in April 2009. Another track featuring Regan was released on the EP The Looking Glass.
- Judy Dyble – Regan contributed vocals to the tracks "C'est la Vie" and "Harp Song", which feature on Dyble's 2009 album Talking with Strangers. Dyble and Regan co-wrote the song "Headful of Stars", with Dyble providing the lyrics, and this appears on Dyble's album '"Flow and Change".
- La Femme Verte – A new cover version project by Jean-Marc Lederman, the album Small Distortions features Regan contributing vocals and instruments alongside Gene Loves Jezebel's Jay Aston and others to a number of tracks including Nine Inch Nails' "Hurt", Angelo Badalamenti/Julee Cruise's "Falling", the Rolling Stones track "Moonlight Mile", the Pet Shop Boys' "Being Boring", and The Mamas & the Papas' "Monday Monday".
- Leader of the Starry Skies – A tribute album for Tim Smith of Cardiacs, on which Regan contributes a cover version of the Sea Nymphs track "Shaping the River".
- The Curator – Regan performed vocals on "On the Great North Road" and the title track from the album Sometime Soon.
- Vocals on tracks "Before We Fall" and "Change Me Once Again" on the Memories of Machines album Warm Winter.
- Backing vocals on the track "Under My Skin" on the charity single released by The Last Cry.
- Co-wrote and sang on "Starstruck Eyes" for Mark Thwaite's album Volumes.

== Personal life ==
Regan graduated in 2014 from Bath Spa University in Bath, Somerset, with a master's degree in songwriting. From September 2015 to December 2022, she was a lecturer on the BA degree Commercial Music programme, and MA degree Songwriting at the university's College of Liberal Arts.

In a March 2008 BBC News Magazine article regarding gender stereotypes too often influencing which musical instrument schoolchildren learn, Regan said that the electric guitar is still seen as a male's instrument, despite great female exponents in recent years.. Based on her own experiences, she said:

There was no opportunity to learn anything other than traditional orchestral instruments at school and so I muddled along on my own and felt quite isolated as I went to an all-girl school and none of my peers seemed to have any interest in electric guitar. It seemed like a freakish thing for me to be interested in. I was quite popular at school and had a load of friends, but this was just seen as 'one of my little quirks'.

== Writing ==
In 2020, Regan had the chapter "Three Pronged Attack: The pincer movement of gender allies, tempered radicals and pioneers", published in the Routledge title Gender in Music Production. In 2023, she had a chapter published by Equinox in the book Venue Stories: From Back Room to Rave Room, from the Toilet Circuit to the Town Hall. Then in 2023, she had a chapter published in The Routledge Companion to Folk Horror. Regan's official website states that she is "currently writing a book". Regan is also a contributor to Louder Than War where she has an author profile.

== Album discography ==
Guest appearances on other artists' albums not shown.

=== with All About Eve ===
- All About Eve (1988)
- Scarlet and Other Stories (1989)
- Touched by Jesus (1991)
- Ultraviolet (1992)
- Winter Words (1992)
- Fairy Light Nights I (2000)
- Fairy Light Nights II (2001)
- Live and Electric at the Union Chapel (2001)
- Return to Eden, Vol. 1: The Early Recordings (2002)
- Iceland (2002)
- Cinemasonic (2003)
- Keepsakes (2006)

=== with Mice ===
- ...Because I Can (1996)
- New and Improved (2001)

=== with Jules et Jim ===
- Swimming (1999)
- Subtitles (2002)

=== with Hussey-Regan ===
- Curios (2011)

=== with Regan & Bricheno ===
- Apparitions (2024)
