= Because I Can (Mice album) =

... Because I Can

Studio album by Mice
- Released: 5 August 1996
- Label: Permanent Records
- Producer: Julianne Regan; Tim McTighe

Mice chronology
... Because I Can (1996)	New And Improved (2001)

Professional ratings
Review scores
Source	Rating
Allmusic	3.5/5 stars

... Because I Can is the first (and only) studio album by Mice, and released through the Permanent Records label. Although a second album, New And Improved, was released, this was not a new album but rather an extended re-issue, released through the Jamtart label. The album peaked at 93 on the Official Albums Chart.

== Versions ==
Two versions of this album exist - a standard one disc version and a special edition two disc version, the second disc containing four songs from a BBC Radio 1 session.

Personnel on BBC Radio 1 session: Guitars: Dave Woodman; Julianne Regan; Marty Willson-Piper. Keyboards: Ali Kane. Bass: Tim McTighe. Drums: Dominic Luckman.

== Track listing ==
Tracks taken from liner notes:

1. "Mat's Prozac"
2. "Star"
3. "Dear Sir"
4. "Bang Bang"
5. "The Milkman"
6. "Blue Sonic Boy"
7. "Julie Christie"
8. "Miss World"
9. "Trumpet Song"
10. "Battersea"
11. "Messed Up"

On the special edition version, disc two contained live recordings of:

1. "The Milkman"
2. "Mat's Prozac"
3. "Blue Sonic Boy"
4. "Dear Sir"

== Reception ==
Chris True from AllMusic said it was "a solid record, with solid songwriting, catchy hooks, and plenty of humor and emotion ... the opener, 'Mat's Prozac' is a biting, sly, and cynical look at emotional assistance through pharmaceutical means, and 'Miss World' is an atmospheric song that would have stood out as a gem in the Eves' catalog".
