= All About Eve (album) =

Studio album by All About Eve
- Released: 15 February 1988
- Studio: Ridge Farm Studio, Rusper; The Manor Studio, Shipton-on-Cherwell
- Length: 45:52
- Label: Mercury/Phonogram
- Producer: Paul Samwell-Smith; Richard Gottehrer; Wayne Hussey; Simon Hinkler

All About Eve chronology
All About Eve (1988)	Scarlet and Other Stories (1989)

Singles from All About Eve
- 1. "In the Clouds" Released: 1 April 1986; 2. "Our Summer" / "Lady Moonlight" Released: 13 April 1987; 3. "Flowers in Our Hair" Released: 29 June 1987; 4. "Wild Hearted Woman" / "Apple Tree Man" Released: 11 January 1988; 5. "Every Angel" Released: 28 March 1988; 6. "Martha's Harbour" Released: 18 July 1988; 7. "What Kind of Fool" Released: 31 October 1988

Professional ratings
Review scores
Source	Rating
AllMusic	4/5 stars

All About Eve is the self-titled debut album of All About Eve. Commercially, this was their most successful, reaching No. 7 in the UK charts and spawning four Top 40 singles (one of which went top 10). Most of the album was produced by Paul Samwell-Smith.

== Release ==
Some of the earlier cassette versions of the album had the album title Flowers in Our Hair printed on both sides of the tape, instead of All About Eve.

Although drummer Mark Price was a full-time member of the band when this album was completed, he was not present for all of its recording. Some songs feature Mick Brown, on loan from The Mission, one features session drummer Greg Brimstone, and one features a drum machine.

The album spent 29 weeks in the UK top 100 album charts, and is certified Gold with in excess of 100,000 units being sold.

All About Eve was bolstered by several singles preceding and following the album's February 1988 release: "In the Clouds" charted at No. 47 on the UK Singles Chart, "Wild Hearted Woman"/"Apple Tree Man" at No. 33, "Every Angel" at No. 30, "Martha's Harbour" at No. 10, and "What Kind of Fool" at No. 29. A different version of "Flowers in Our Hair" was released as a single (no chart position) under the band's own "Eden" label before they signed to Mercury and recorded this album.

In return for Julianne Regan helping out on backing vocals for The Mission's first studio album, God's Own Medicine, Wayne Hussey lent his backing vocals to the song "Shelter from the Rain". Hussey and his bandmate Simon Hinkler also produced "Lady Moonlight".

"She Moves Through the Fair" is the only non-All About Eve composition on the album, it being a traditional Irish folk song.

One of the B-sides to the single "What Kind of Fool" was "The Garden of Jane Delawney", originally by Trees.

== Track listing ==
All songs written and composed by Tim Bricheno, Andy Cousin and Julianne Regan except where noted.

Original vinyl LP release
No.	Title	Writer(s)	Length
1.	"Flowers in Our Hair"		4:25
2.	"Gypsy Dance"		4:04
3.	"In the Clouds"		3:33
4.	"Martha's Harbour"		3:12
5.	"Every Angel"		3:57
6.	"Shelter from the Rain"		5:24
7.	"She Moves Through the Fair"	Traditional; arranged by Bricheno, Cousin, Regan	5:06
8.	"Wild Hearted Woman"	Bricheno, Mick Brown, Cousin, Regan	3:25
9.	"Never Promise (Anyone Forever)"		3:53
10.	"What Kind of Fool"		4:02
11.	"In the Meadow"		5:35
Total length:			45:52

CD reissue
No.	Title	Writer(s)	Length
1.	"Flowers in Our Hair"		4:25
2.	"Gypsy Dance"		4:04
3.	"In the Clouds"		3:33
4.	"Martha's Harbour"		3:12
5.	"Every Angel"		3:57
6.	"Like Emily"		5:16
7.	"Shelter from the Rain"		5:24
8.	"She Moves Through the Fair"	Traditional; arranged by Bricheno, Cousin, Regan	5:06
9.	"Wild Hearted Woman"	Bricheno, Brown, Cousin, Regan	3:25
10.	"Never Promise (Anyone Forever)"		3:53
11.	"Apple Tree Man"		3:59
12.	"What Kind of Fool"		4:02
13.	"In the Meadow"		5:35
14.	"Lady Moonlight"		4:12
Total length:			59:14

== Re-issue ==
On 25 September 2015, the album was reissued with 12" versions of some tracks, including singles and B-sides, as part of Universal UMC "Re-presents" series.

=== Disc One ===
1. Flowers in Our Hair
2. Gypsy Dance
3. In the Clouds
4. Martha's Harbour
5. Every Angel
6. Shelter from the Rain
7. She Moves Through the Fair
8. Wild Hearted Woman
9. Never Promise (Anyone Forever)
10. What Kind of Fool
11. In the Meadow
12. Our Summer (extended version)
13. Flowers in Our Hair (extended version)
14. In the Clouds (extended version)
15. Wild Hearted Woman (extended version)
16. Every Angel (extended version)
17. What Kind of Fool (Autumn Rhapsody)

Re-Issues notes disc one: Tracks 1–6, 9–14, 16, 17 by Bricheno, Cousin, Regan (as on song listing [i.e., not alphabetical]). Track 7 is a traditional Irish folk song, arrangements by Bricheno, Cousin, Regan. Tracks 8 and 15 by Bricheno, Brown, Cousin, Regan.

=== Disc Two ===
1. Our Summer
2. Lady Moonlight
3. Shelter from the Rain (B-side version)
4. Flowers in Our Hair (single version)
5. Paradise
6. Devil Woman
7. Calling Your Name
8. Apple Tree Man
9. Like Emily
10. What Kind of Fool (reprise)
11. Every Angel (single version)
12. Wild Flowers
13. Candy Tree
14. More Than This Hour
15. Another Door
16. In the Meadow (live)
17. Never Promise (Anyone Forever) (live)
18. What Kind of Fool (single version)
19. Gold and Silver
20. The Garden of Jane Delawney

Re-issue notes disc two: Tracks 1–18 by Bricheno, Cousin, Regan. Track 19 by Bricheno, Cousin, Price, Regan; this is the original b-side version, subsequently re-recorded for the second All About Eve album, Scarlet and Other Stories. Track 20 by Bias Boshell is a Trees cover.

== Personnel ==
All About Eve

- Julianne Regan – vocals, keyboards, piano
- Tim Bricheno – guitars
- Andy Cousin – bass guitar
- Mark Price – drums, percussion

Additional personnel

- Mick Brown – drums
- Greg Brimstone – drums
- Simon Hinkler – keyboards
- Wayne Hussey – backing vocals on "Shelter from the Rain"
- Adam Peters – arrangement and conducting on "What Kind of Fool"
- Paul Samwell-Smith – drone, horns, piano on "Wild Hearted Woman", recorder, strings
- Ric Sanders – violin
- Peter-John Vettese – keyboards
