= Fairy Light Nights =

Concert series and two live albums by All About Eve

Live album by All About Eve
- Released: 12 June 2000
- Labels: Yeaah, Almafame
- Producer: All About Eve

All About Eve chronology
(Seeing Stars) (1993)	Fairy Light Nights (2000)	Fairy Light Nights 2 (2001)

Professional ratings
Review scores
Source	Rating
Allmusic	3.5/5 stars

Fairy Light Nights is the collective term for a large number of acoustic gigs performed by All About Eve between January 2000 and February 2002. The name stems from the fact that fairy lights were hung from the music and microphone stands. Two live albums were released during this time, Fairy Light Nights in 2000 (sometimes referred to as Fairy Light Nights 1) and Fairy Light Nights 2 a year later. These recordings were later released as a double album, Acoustic Nights, in 2003.

The "Fairy Light Night" concerts featured a simple line-up of Julianne Regan on lead vocals, Marty Willson-Piper on a variety of acoustic guitars and backing vocals, and Andy Cousin on electric bass or acoustic 12-string guitar, with occasional guest appearances by other musicians.

== Background ==
In late 1999, All About Eve played three fully electric reunion concerts supporting The Mission. During this time, Willson-Piper persuaded Regan to keep the group going and do a few acoustic gigs. The rationale for choosing acoustic gigs included Willson-Piper's previous experience of doing them himself, the lower cost (the band at this time being wholly self-funded) and the fact that, at that point, the band had no drummer - Mark Price not being able to leave Del Amitri on a long-term basis. The first Fairy Light Night was on 25 January 2000 at the Warwick Arts Centre in Regan's hometown of Coventry.

Fairy Light Nights 2

Live album by All About Eve
- Released: 5 May 2001
- Label: JamTart
- Producer: All About Eve

All About Eve chronology
Fairy Light Nights (2000)	Fairy Light Nights 2 (2001)	Live and Electric at the Union Chapel (2001)

Professional ratings
Review scores
Source	Rating
Allmusic	3.5/5 stars

=== Success by word of mouth ===
The first gigs were exceptionally well received by fans, with word-of-mouth and internet forums allowing renewed interest in the band to spread rapidly. Most of the gigs were very well attended, with many being full. Fairy Light Nights CD was released within six months, recording performances from various gigs. A year later, attendance at the gigs and sales of the CD were such that it was considered viable to release a second album, Fairy Light Nights 2, containing further songs recorded simultaneously but not included on the original album.

=== Ups and downs ===
In all, there were nearly 100 gigs, at a frequency of more than one a week at the height of activity. The band played as far north as Aberdeen and south as Penzance. The fans and band held most of the shows to be highly successful, although the one in Worthing is often cited by all who were there as a low point in the tour. Because Marty's amplifiers were too loud for the venue and created intolerable feedback for the first few songs, Willson-Piper was forced to sit out the rest of the gig without playing, putting him in a foul mood and causing him to berate the audience between songs.

=== End of the era ===
The last Fairy Light Night was in Crewe on 3 February 2002. This was also the last All About Eve concert featuring Willson-Piper, who would leave the band immediately after, citing musical differences. He was replaced in the spring of that year by a Finn, Toni Haimi, lately of bands such as Nozzle and Malluka. By the time they returned on tour again in May, they were a five-piece band, and the subsequent gigs were fully electric.

=== Other activity during this period ===
All About Eve also played some fully electric dates during this time: these do not technically count as Fairy Light Nights but were equally well received by fans. These gigs included the 2000 Cropredy Festival, where devoted fans sat through two hours of the Incredible String Band before All About Eve finally came on. These fully electric gigs included a concert at the Union Chapel in December 2000, which was recorded and later released as the album Live and Electric at the Union Chapel. The success of this concert and the comparatively high sales of the album encouraged the band to hold another, equally successful, concert in the same venue a year later.

== New songs during this time ==
No new All About Eve songs were premiered during any Fairy Light Night; however, three songs by Willson-Piper (already on his solo albums) were performed: "Forever," "You Bring Your Love to Me," and "Will I Start To Bleed?" None of these has been performed as All About Eve songs since Willson-Piper's departure.

"Miss World" was previously a Mice song, but it has since been performed as an All About Eve song.

== Fairy Light Nights 1 track listing ==
1. "What Kind of Fool?"
2. "In the Clouds"
3. "Forever"
4. "Share It With Me"
5. "Will I Start to Bleed?"
6. "Miss World"
7. "Martha's Harbour"
8. "Shelter from the Rain"
9. "Are You Lonely?"
10. "Appletree Man"

== Fairy Light Nights 2 track listing ==
1. "Scarlet"
2. "The Mystery We Are"
3. "You Bring Your Love to Me"
4. "Freeze"
5. "Mine"
6. "More Than the Blues"
7. "Never Promise (Anyone Forever)"
8. "Yesterday Goodbye"
9. "Wild Hearted Woman"
10. "Every Angel"

== Re-releases ==
Almafame went bankrupt shortly after the issue of Fairy Light Nights 1. Since then, two records, Unplugged and Martha's Harbour, have been released without the band's permission or authority. A third version, All About Eve's What Kind of Fool, was also released via 'Charly' and was available for streaming and as a download only through many mainstream download music sites until Julianne Regan challenged the legality via Apple Music which resulted in a takedown in August 2026. All three releases contain identical material to Fairy Light Nights 1.

The second album, Fairy Light Nights 2, was released by JamTart, the band's label, and so was not subjected to the same re-issuing conflicts.

=== Acoustic Nights ===
This is a JamTart repackaging of both Fairy Light Nights CDs into a double album. The band approved it, although they emphasised that it includes nothing not already included in the two single albums.

=== Ownership ===
The recordings are - and always have been - jointly owned by band members. Any release has been under a manufacturing and distribution arrangement.
