= This Burning Effigy =

This Burning Effigy were an Irish gothic rock/ethereal wave band, originally formed in Dublin in 1993, and consisting of members Stephen Carey (guitar and keyboards), Ger Egan (vocals), Micheal Cowley (bass), Brian Fallon (drums). They recorded one album with this line-up, before becoming a two-piece and subsequently recorded two more albums, before splitting in 2001.

== Origins ==
Formed in 1993 with a fifth member, Phil Doyle on guitar, the band began performing regularly around Dublin, and recorded their first demo The Eternal Procession at Heartbeat Studios in Dublin, on audio cassette. Doyle subsequently left, but the cassette attracted the attention of record company Grave News, who asked them for a track for the compilation album Dreams in the Witch House. The track, "Communion with Sophia", led to an album deal with the label.

The subsequent album, To Bestial Gods..., was recorded during 1995 at Sonic Studios, Dublin, with guest vocalist Tanya Doyle.

== Move to London ==
In the summer of 1996 the band relocated to London, but two of the original line-up, Cowley and Fallon, decided to remain in Dublin due to personal commitments. The remaining two members continued to write songs, some of which turned up on various compilation albums. Working on the new album, working title Exiles, the band enlisted the vocals of Julianne Regan, of All About Eve, on some of the tracks. The album, recorded in 1998 at Substate Belgravia Studios, London, came out in 1999 with the title Descent.

In 2000, the band released their final album Resolution, recorded at The Hermitage and Shelter Studios, London. The album contained new songs as well as remixes and alternative versions of previous tracks.

In 2001 the band split up, with Egan returning to Dublin and Carey remaining in London. Carey later formed the band The Eden House.

== Discography ==
Albums:

To Bestial Gods... (1996)

1. "Lantern"
2. "Affliction"
3. "The Well"
4. "Thine Adversary"
5. "Flagellation And Dancing"
6. "Communion With Sophia"
7. "Her Own Volition"
8. "For Within This Journey"
9. "Amaunet (The Unknown Goddess)"
10. "Emeritus"
11. "Drowning The Veil"
12. "Cypher"

Descent (1998)

1. "The Parody"
2. "Sylvan"
3. "Exquisite" †
4. "The Eternal Procession"
5. "An Untold Release"
6. "Transfiguration (Extract 1): Seclusion"
7. "Descent" †
8. "Exiled"
9. "Pure Complex (Version)" †
10. "Nothing More Sacred Than Apathy"
11. "Bastardised"
12. "Transfiguration (Extract 3): Figures"

Resolution (2000)

1. "The Orra Man" †
2. "Carnival Syndrome"
3. "Change To Change"
4. "The Loose Fabric Of Sense"
5. "Transfiguration (Extract 2): Delerium" (Alternative Vocals)
6. "Sterilise"
7. "In Adamantine Chains" (Fatigues Issue)
8. "Bare" (Cabra Boot Boy Mix)
9. "Pure Complex" (Queen D-Eve-A Mix) †
10. "The Parody" (Intra Muros Mix)
11. "Exiled" (Welders Union Mix)
12. "After Thought" (Retrospective Version, Instrumental)

† Features Julianne Regan
