= New and Improved (Mice album) =

New And Improved

Compilation album by Mice
- Released: 2001
- Label: JamTart
- Producer: Julianne Regan, Tim McTighe

Mice chronology
... Because I Can (1996)	New And Improved (2001)

New And Improved is a compilation album by Mice that was released on All About Eve's label JamTart in 2001. It contains all of Mice's one and only album ... Because I Can, as well as three of the B-sides (including "Martian Man", a cover of the Lynsey de Paul song) and five Mice and/or Julianne Regan demos from the same period (1995-1997). It was released by Julianne Regan post the All About Eve 1999 reformation, due to the renewed interest in Mice that this had caused.

== Track listing ==
1. "Dear Sir"
2. "Miss World"
3. "Star As Bright As You Are"
4. "Trumpet Song"
5. "The Milkman"
6. "Matt's Prozac"
7. "Blue Sonic Boy"
8. "Bang Bang"
9. "Battersea"
10. "Messed Up"
11. "Star"
12. "Tiny Window"
13. "Pyjamadrama"
14. "Martian Man"
15. "Unborn Angel"
16. "Dumb Girl"
17. "A Dark Place"
18. "Hit Or Miss"
19. "Julie Christie"
