= Ultraviolet (All About Eve album) =

Studio album by All About Eve
- Released: 26 October 1992
- Label: MCA
- Producer: All About Eve

All About Eve chronology
Touched by Jesus (1991)	Ultraviolet (1992)	Winter Words (1992)

Professional ratings
Review scores
Source	Rating
AllMusic	link
NME	5/10

Ultraviolet is the fourth and final studio album by All About Eve, released in October 1992. It was the only album that the band released with MCA. Despite quite positive reviews at the time this album was not commercially successful, reaching only #36 on the UK Albums Chart. The two singles only reached, respectively, #38 and #57 in the UK Singles Chart. As a consequence of this, the band was dropped by MCA shortly afterward.

"Outshine the Sun" was frequently used at the band's gigs for a finale. "Some Finer Day" was the last single released by the band for twelve years, "Let Me Go Home" being the next one in 2004.

== Track listing ==
1. "Phased"
2. "Yesterday Goodbye"
3. "Mine"
4. "Freeze"
5. "The Things He Told Her"
6. "Infrared"
7. "I Don't Know"
8. "Dream Butcher"
9. "Some Finer Day"
10. "Blindfolded Visionary"
11. "Outshine the Sun"

== Personnel ==
- Andy Cousin - bass, 12-string guitar (tracks 7 and 11)
- Mark Price - percussion, drums, sound effect (lunar siren, track 1)
- Julianne Regan - voice, guitars (track 7), bass (tracks 7 and 11); mellotron, piano, sitar & Indian pipes (track 11)
- Marty Willson-Piper - electric and acoustic guitars
