= Jordan Reyne =

New Zealand musician (born 1974)

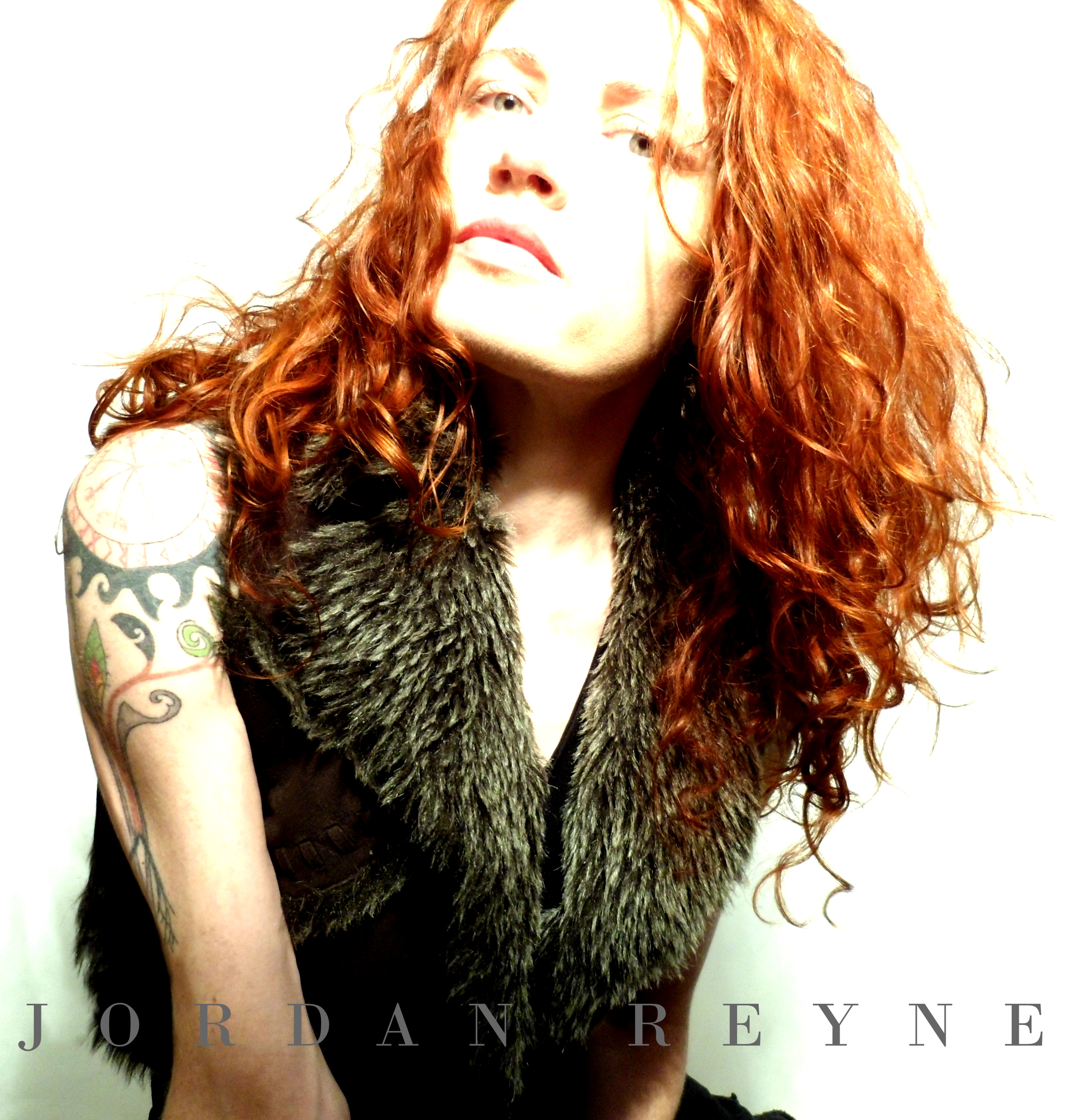
- Self-portrait photograph, 2009

Background information
- Born: 27 April 1974 (age 52)
- Origin: New Zealand
- Genre: industrial-tinged alternative folk
- Instruments: Vocals; Industrial revolution era machinery
- Years active: 1997–present
- Website: jordanreyne.com

Jordan Reyne is an experimental musician currently residing in Toruń, Poland. Jordan's sound has been variously described as "industrial-tinged folk" and "antipodean Steampunk" yet defies any cut and dried genre description. She combines the two usually disparate genres of folk and industrial, bringing in Celtic vocal melody, historically-based narrative and the sounds of steam, iron and industrial "found sound". Several of her releases are set in the time of the Industrial Revolution.

== Early life ==
Reyne came from England. Soon after her birth, her parents moved with her to New Zealand. Reyne grew up in an isolated community on the west coast of New Zealand's South Island, 30km south of Westport. As a teenager, Reyne moved to New Zealand's North Island where she studied software engineering at the Central Institute of Technology in Wellington. She later moved to Auckland to study philosophy at the University of Auckland before leaving for Germany in 2006. Jordan remained in Germany until 2011, when she relocated to the UK.

== Musical career ==
Jordan Reyne's first album release (Birds of Prey) was in 1997, and earned the New-Zealand-born musician a Tui nomination for most promising female musician. Reyne has since released 11 more albums of her own work to critical acclaim worldwide, earning two more Tui nominations and a Sounz commendation award.

Reyne's music draws on folklore and story-telling to depict political themes and the lives of ordinary characters in often extraordinary situations Her use of "Found Sound", percussion and drones, often in the form of factory noise, aims at grounding the stories in their time. The album "How the Dead Live" was commissioned by the New Zealand Arts Council and Wild Creations initiative and follows the life of one of New Zealand's first pioneer women, Susannah Hawes. The album draws on Susannah's archived letters, and the sounds of farming machinery and the environment at the time. Similarly, "Children of a Factory Nation" follows a Welsh family from the ports of Cardiff to the workhouses and Factories of London. Jordan's most recent project "Maiden, Mother, Crone" looks specifically at how pagan archetypes affect the roles and perceptions of women in the present day.

Along with her own releases, Jordan has performed and written with other musicians and bands as well as featuring on projects such as Capcom's Resident Evil 7: Biohazard soundtrack, written and arranged by Michael A. Levine. Her vocals also feature on releases from Cafe Del Mar, Breaks Co-op, The Strawpeople, and The Eden House where she contributed vocals to the album "Half Life" and was part of the band's live lineup until 2014. Her own album "The Annihilation Sequence" (2013) also features the voice of Tony Pettit and the mixing / mastering of Stephen Carey from the band.

Between 1999 and 2005 Jordan wrote under the moniker "Dr Kevorkian & the Suicide Machine", and also performed live under this name. Two of her CDs were also released under this title, which gained her attention and a following internationally in the darkwave and steampunk scenes, and prompted a move to Germany in 2006. As well as the dark-folk, industrial and gothic scenes, Jordan has also been involved in several notable New Zealand electronic music projects including Strawpeople, Zane Lowe's Breaks Co-op project, and Baitercell and Schumacher. Reyne also performed as a vocalist on one of the scenes in Peter Jackson's second Lord of the Rings film, in a scene that depicted Theodred's funeral. This scene, however, was not included in the final edit of the film.

== Discography ==
=== Albums ===
- Birds of Prey (1997), Lost Records, New Zealand.
- The Ironman (2000), Universal Music, New Zealand - as "Dr Kevorkian & the Suicide Machine".
- The Loneliest of Creatures (2002), DDV Laboratories/Mediatrix, New Zealand - as "Dr Kevorkian & the Suicide Machine".
- Passenger (2004), Jayrem Records/Mediatrix, New Zealand.
- How the Dead Live (2009). Sounz, New Zealand.
- Children of a Factory Nation (2012). Factory Nation / Believe Digital UK.
- The Annihilation Sequence (2013). Factory Nation (UK).
- Crone (2014). Factory Nation (UK).
- Mother (2015). Factory Nation (UK).
- Maiden (2015). Factory Nation (UK).
- Bardo (2018).

=== Collaborations ===
- Breaks Co-op - "Transister" (1997)
- Strawpeople - "Wire" (2004)
- Baitercell and Schumacher - "Leap of Faith" (2005)
- The Eden House - "Butterflies", "Indifference" and "The Tempest" - on the album "Half Life". Jungle Records (2013)
- Resident Evil 7: Biohazard Original Soundtrack - "Go Tell Aunt Rhody". Sumthing Else Music Works (2017)
