= Bare (Wayne Hussey album) =

Studio album by Wayne Hussey
- Released: 2008
- Recorded: November–December 2007
- Studio: Green Room Studio, Porto Alegre, Brazil
- Genre: Alternative rock
- Length: 56:25
- Label: Eyes Wide Shut Records
- Producer: Wayne Hussey

Professional ratings
Review scores
Source	Rating
Classic Rock	5/10 stars

Bare is a solo album by Wayne Hussey, released in 2008. It contains a mixture of songs by the Mission and cover versions from bands including The Beach Boys and U2, plus one new song, "One Thing Leads to Another".

== Track listing ==
1. "A Night Like This" (The Cure cover) – 3:40
2. "Keep It in the Family" – 4:53
3. "Black Mountain Mist" – 3:16
4. "With or Without You" (U2 cover) – 5:25
5. "Shelter from the Storm" – 3:53
6. "Garden of Delight" – 3:53
7. "God Only Knows" (The Beach Boys cover) – 4:00
8. "Absolution" – 4:51
9. "Stars Don't Shine without You" – 2:55
10. "My Funny Valentine" (cover version of the popular show tune from the musical Babes in Arms) – 3:20
11. "Bird of Passage" – 5:51
12. "Grotesque" – 5:34
13. "One Thing Leads to Another" – 4:47

== Personnel ==
- Produced, Engineered and mixed by Wayne Hussey
- Cellos on "Grotesque" arranged and performed by Caroline Dale and recorded by John Reynolds
- Mastered by Maor Appelbaum
