= Go Tell Aunt Rhody =

English language folk song of nineteenth-century American origin

Song

"Go Tell Aunt Rhody" is an English language folk song of nineteenth-century American origin. It has a Roud Folk Song Index number of 3346. The tune is older, dating to the 18th century. It originated as a gavotte in the 1752 opera Le devin du village (The Village Soothsayer) by Jean-Jacques Rousseau.

The subject of the song is grief associated with loss, in this case from the death of an "old gray goose".

== In popular culture ==
A version of the song was created by composer Michael A. Levine and musician Jordan Reyne for Capcom's 2017 survival horror game Resident Evil 7: Biohazard.
