= The Eden House =

Multinational gothic rock collaborative project

- Origin: United Kingdom
- Genres: Gothic rock, psychedelic, ethereal wave
- Years active: 2007–present
- Label: Jungle Records
- Members: Stephen Carey; Tony Pettitt; Simon Rippin; Andy Jackson; Bob Loveday; Amandine ‘Ammers’ Ferrari; Evi Vine; Valenteen; Monica Richards; Julianne Regan; Tallulah Rendall; Barbar Luck; Nod Wright; Peter Yates; Paul Wright; Candia McKormack; Stevyn Grey; Dave Blomberg; Yig Hughes; Peter Gorritz; Kelli Ali; Anna-Christina; Simon Hinkler; Liz Green; Laura Bennett; Phil Manzanera; Jordan Reyne; Louise Crane; Meghan-Noel Pettitt

The Eden House is a collaborative musical project, initiated by Stephen Carey (formerly of This Burning Effigy and Adoration) and involving a collection of guest musicians and vocalists; later joined by Tony Pettitt (formerly of Fields of the Nephilim, Rubicon and NFD).

Their debut album Smoke & Mirrors was released in April 2009 in the United States and Europe, and May in the United Kingdom. Vocals were provided by Monica Richards, Evi Vine, Amandine Ferrari and Julianne Regan.

Other contributors include violinist Bob Loveday, who had previously worked with Penguin Café Orchestra and Van Morrison as well as being a member of Bob Geldof’s band; former Fields of The Nephilim members Peter Yates, Nod Wright and Paul Wright; and drummers Simon Rippin (previously with Nefilim and NFD) and Bob Irwin (who has also worked with Johnny Cash and Van Morrison).

The Eden House toured in 2009 and 2010, with Ferrari, Richards and Vine sharing vocals. Festival performances included a headline slot at the Whitby Gothic Weekend and an appearance at Germany's Wave-Gotik-Treffen.

The band's second release, The Looking Glass, featured five cover versions and was released in February 2010: it included guest vocals by Tallulah Rendall. Pink Floyd's Grammy-nominated sound engineer Andy Jackson, who mastered the first album and had previously worked with Fields of the Nephilim, also joined the line-up on guitar. A special two-disc edition, comprising a DVD recording of nine songs performed live in addition to the CD of cover versions, was also released.

In 2012, the project released the Timeflows EP. It features guest musicians Simon Hinkler, Bob Loveday and Simon Rippin, along with vocalists Valenteen, Amandine Ferrari and Meghan-Noel Pettitt.

In 2013, the album Half Life was released. it saw the introduction of Laura Bennett and Jordan Reyne, both as vocalists to the live lineup and as songwriting contributors to the new album, alongside album vocalists Lee Douglas (Anathema), Meghan-Noel Pettitt, Queenie Moy and Phoenix J. The album also featured guest guitarists Simon Hinkler and Phil Manzanera.

The band's third album, Songs for the Broken Ones, was released in June 2017. In support of the album, the band undertook a short tour of the UK, performing in Glasgow, Manchester, Leeds and London with singers Monica Richards, Louise Patricia Crane and Meghan-Noel Pettitt. The Society, Skeletal Family and Siberia appeared as special guests. Their song "To Believe In Something" was used over the closing titles for the 2016 film Yu-Gi-Oh!: The Dark Side of Dimensions.

== Discography ==
=== Albums ===
- Smoke & Mirrors (2009, Jungle Records)
- Half Life (2013, Jungle Records)
- Songs for the Broken Ones (2017, Jungle Records)

=== Singles and EPs ===
- The Looking Glass (DVD-V + CD, EP) (2009, Jungle Records)
- "Timeflows" (2012, Jungle Records)
- "Bad Men (OnTheirWayToDoBadThings)" (2013, Jungle Records)
- "Verdades" (2017, Jungle Records)
