= Jean-Marc Lederman =

Belgian keyboard player and producer

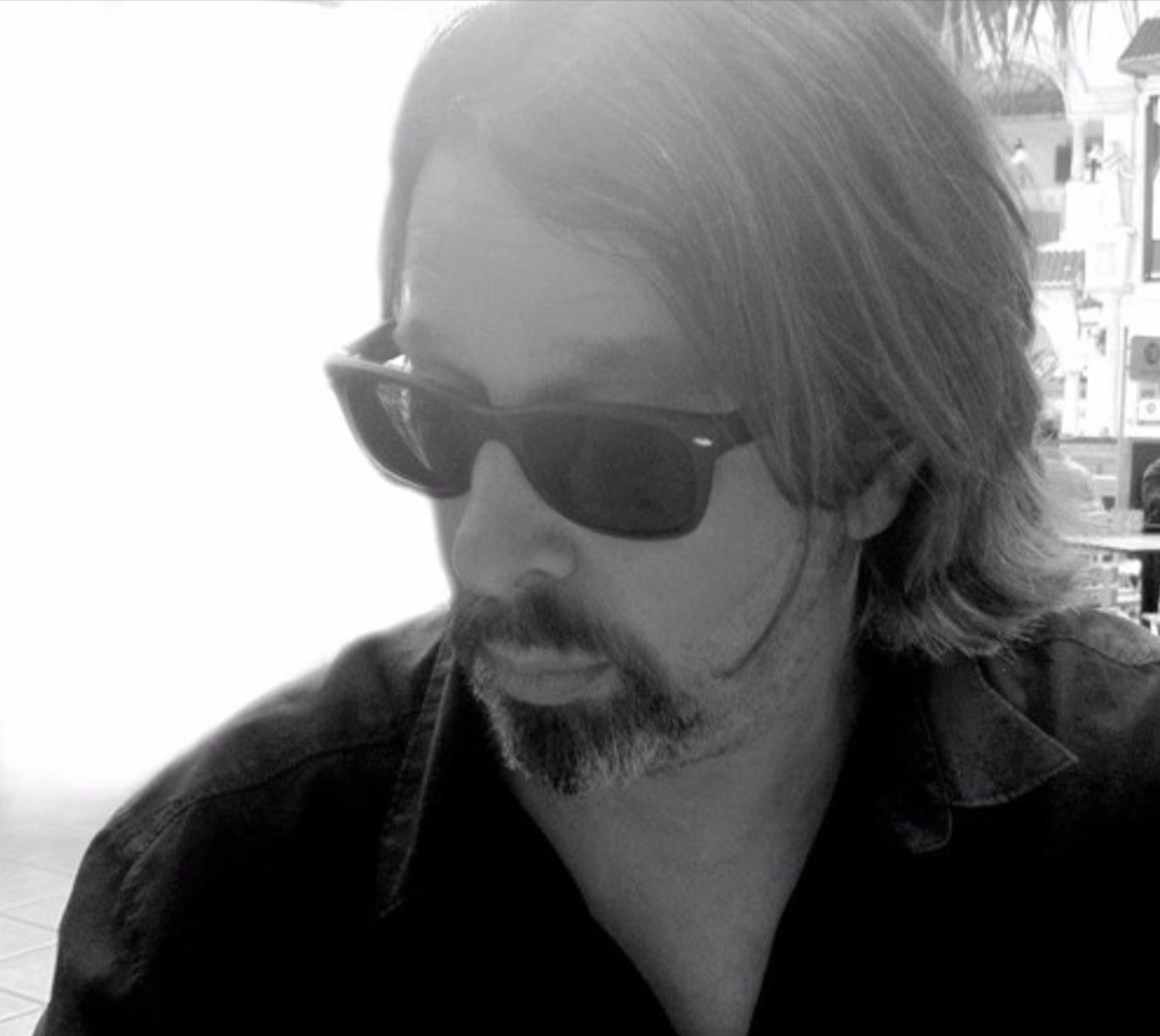

Jean-Marc Lederman is a Belgian keyboard player and producer. He has worked with bands such as Fad Gadget, The The, Gene Loves Jezebel, The Weathermen, Belgian rock band Streets, and Front 242, and with other artists including Julianne Regan, Jacques Duvall and Alain Bashung.

His main projects were The Weathermen, Kid Montana, Jules et Jim with Julianne Regan, Ghost & Writer with Frank Spinath of Seabound, Man-Dello (a solo electronica project), and cover version project La Femme Verte. He composes music for movies and videogames.

Jean-Marc Lederman also developed the Jean-Marc Lederman Experience where vocalists collaborates on themed albums.

He developed a musical iPhone app with Karl Bartos (ex-Kraftwerk) and Japanese multimedia artist Masayuki Akamatsu.

Recently, he has collaborated with Emileigh Rohn from Detroit-based band Chiasm under the name Rohn-Lederman In 2021, Jean-Marc Lederman published a book called 'The Mysterious Manuscript From Gabriel Garcia Marquez".

Most of Lederman's record covers are done by Erica Hinyot, a Belgian plastician.

== Selected discography ==
=== Jean-Marc Lederman ===
- The Space Between Worlds (2017)
- "Ode A La pluie" Music For An Exhibition About Rain (with Erica Hinyot paintings and poem) (2018)
- "The Helpless Voyage Of The Titanic" [Instrumental/Soundtrack] (2020)
- "Music For Dinosaurs" (2020)
- "The Bad-Tempered Synthesizer" (2021) (with notes by Daniel Miller)
- Night Music For Seahorses And Manatees (2022)
- Soul Music For Zombies (2023)

=== Rohn-Lederman ===
- Venus Chariot (2021)
- Apollo Chariot (2022)
- RAGE! (2022)
- Black And Bleu (2024)
- Forbidden Planet (2025)

=== Jean-Marc Lederman Experience ===
- "The Last Broadcast On Earth" (2015)
- "13 Ghost Stories" (2019)
- "Letters To Gods (and fallen angels")" (2020)
- "The Raven" (2021)
- "Sci-Fi Revisited" (2024)

=== Kid Montana ===
- Statistics Mean Nothing When You Are On The Wrong Plane (1982)
- The Las Vegas Gold Rush (1985)
- Temperamental (1986)
- Temperamental + singles (2008) double CD compilation

=== The Weathermen ===
- 10 Deadly Kisses (1987)
- The Black Album (1988)
- Beyond The Beyond (1990)
- Global 851 (1992)
- Deeper (2004)
- Embedded (2006)
- This is the last communique (?) (2008) PIAS compilation
- Ultimate Poison (2010) 15 tracks MCD Infacted Records
- The Weathermen's Long Lost Instrumental Backing Tapes (2018) Wool-E Discs

=== With Alain Bashung ===
- Chatterton (1994)
- Fantaisie militaire (1998) (composed and performed the track "Ode à la vie")

=== Man-Dello ===
- Vaporetto to Eden (1994)
- Amoretto (unreleased album 2006)

=== Ether ===
- Helleven (1995)

=== Jules et Jim, with Julianne Regan ===
- Swimming (1999)
- Subtitles (2002)

=== La Femme Verte ===
- Small Distortions (2010)

=== Ghost & Writer, with Frank M. Spinath from Seabound ===
- Fourplay (2007) (4 tracks on a compilation album released by Nilailah Records (USA))
- Shipwrecks (2011)
- Red Flags (2013)

=== Leatherman, with Jacques Duvall ===
- Romania (2012)

=== Mari & The Ghost, with Mari Kattman ===
- "Superstitions" (2014)

=== Invisible Sky ===
- Invisible Sky EP* 2016

=== Lederman*Stein with Erik Stein from Cult With No Name ===
- Textbooks For Tomorrow (2020 - digital EP)

=== Lederman De Meyer with Jean-Luc De Meyer from Front 242 ===
- A Tribe Of My Own (digital EP) 2018
- Eleven Grinding Songs (album) 2018

=== Glassko & Fayzer with Julianne Regan from All About Eve ===
- "Music to Relax You While You Struggle Under A Tory Government" (released 29 March 2019)

== Music for films ==
- The Killing Woods (short) 2004
- Deadline (short) 2006
- Thunder And The House Of Magic (2013)
- African Safari (2013)
- Doubleplusonegood (2018)

== Music for video games ==
- Atlantis (2005) BigFishGames
- Fairies (with Julianne Regan) (2005) BigFishGames
- Mystic Inn (with Julianne Regan) (2006) BigFishGames
- Atlantis: Sky Patrol (2006) BigFishGames
- Hidden Expedition: Titanic (2006) BigFishGames
- Fever Frenzy (2007) Legacy
- Turbogems (2007) Ironccode
- Theme from SocioTown (2007)
- Forces Of Arms (2006) Wardogs Studio
