= Tin Star (band) =

- Origin: London, England
- Genres: Electronica
- Years active: 1996–2005
- Label: V2 Records

Tin Star were a British electronica band formed in 1996. Dave Tomlinson and Tim Bricheno were formerly in the Band xc-nn together in the early 1990s.

== History ==
Tomlinson and Bricheno were discussing their musical future together in a London pub. Their conversation was overheard by Tim Gordine who introduced himself and they formed the band together. The group signed to V2 Records and released their debut album, The Thrill Kisser, in 1999. The album had been recorded in Gordine's apartment in London and the restricted space meant the group adapted to using machines rather than a drum kit.

The group scored a hit on US rock radio with "Head", which peaked at number 10 on the Billboard Modern Rock charts in 1999. A second LP, Dirty Bird, followed in May 2001.

The group has since split up.

== Film and television ==
- The song "Dirty Bird" was used in one of the episodes of the TV series, Felicity (Episode 13, season 1).
- "Head" and "Disconnected Child" were used in the film Gossip.
- "Head" is used in episode 1.3 Monsters of Roswell TV show.
- "Head" is used in the movie The Sixth Sense during the children's birthday party scene.
- "Disconnected Child" was used in the Showtime television series Queer as Folk (Season 1 Episode 12).
- "Disconnected Child" was used in the film My First Mister.

== Members ==
- Dave Tomlinson – vocals
- Tim Bricheno – guitar, songwriting
- Tim Gordine – bass, programming

== Discography ==
=== Studio albums ===
- The Thrill Kisser (V2 Records, 1999)
- Dirty Bird (V2 Records, 2001)
