= Wayne Hussey =

English musician

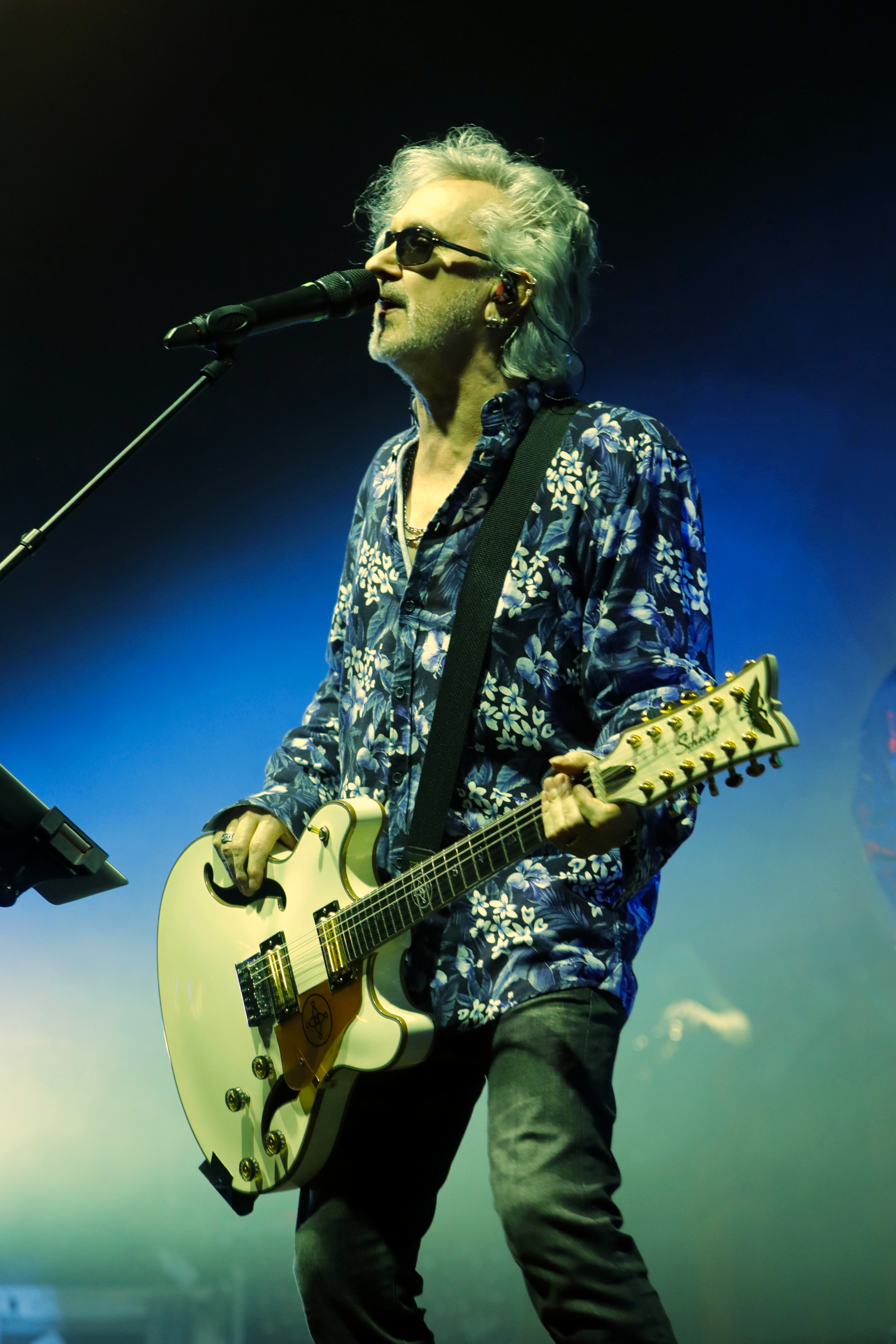
- Hussey performing in 2023

Background information
- Born: Jerry Wayne Hussey; 26 May 1958 (age 68); Bristol, England
- Genres: Alternative rock; gothic rock; post-punk; indie rock
- Occupations: Musician; songwriter; record producer
- Instruments: Vocals; guitar; keyboards
- Years active: 1980–present
- Labels: Cleopatra; Sony Music
- Member of: The Mission
- Formerly of: Dead or Alive; Sisters of Mercy

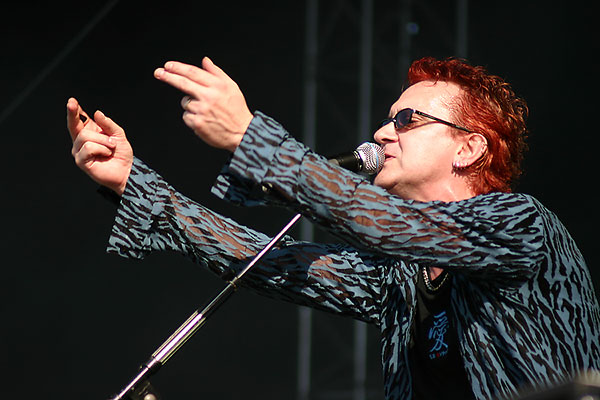
Hussey performing at the M'era Luna Festival in Hildesheim, Germany, 2004

Jerry Wayne Hussey (born 26 May 1958) is an English musician who was born in Bristol, England. He is best known as the lead singer of the Mission, and as the guitarist of the Sisters of Mercy.

== Biography ==
Hussey grew up in Bristol. He was influenced at a young age by Marc Bolan and his band T. Rex, and was thus inspired to become a guitarist. Brought up in the LDS Church, he rebelled against his parents' wishes that he serve as a missionary and moved to Liverpool in the late 1970s to join the scene around Eric's Club, a noted nightclub of the time.

Hussey started to perform, most notably with Pauline Murray and the Invisible Girls, with whom he started songwriting. The first success for Hussey came when he joined Dead or Alive at the request of frontman Pete Burns. After Burns retreated to become more studio-based, Hussey decided to leave and was offered a position with the Sisters of Mercy, concentrating on twelve-string and six-string guitars, contributing to arrangements and using his higher ranged voice for backing vocals which contrasted with Andrew Eldritch's melancholic baritone. After leaving the Sisters of Mercy, Hussey and bassist Craig Adams set up the Mission, recruiting Mick Brown on drums and Simon Hinkler on guitars. He lived in Leeds for a while before moving to London towards the end of the 1980s.

Hussey has produced and played on records by the Mission's Mercury Records labelmates All About Eve and in the late 1990s provided some remixes for Cleopatra Records. He also produced, remixed and appeared on some tracks for the US band Gossamer including the track "Run" for the first Unquiet Grave compilation album by Cleopatra Records. He also produced and played on Brilliant Mistakes (1996) by the Greek band the Flowers of Romance. Hussey has played live with both Gary Numan and the Cure. He is a Liverpool F.C. supporter and after his team's victory in the Champions League Final of 2005, he composed the song entitled "Draped in Red" featured on the studio album God Is a Bullet.

In 2019, Hussey released his autobiography Salad Daze.

As of 2011, Hussey was living in São Paulo, Brazil, married to a Brazilian actress, Cinthya. He has two children from previous relationships.

== Solo career ==
Since 2002, Hussey has regularly played solo shows that features Mission material, new songs and cover versions. After he wound up the Mission for the second time in early 2009, he released his first solo studio album called Bare in October of that year on the Sony Music label. (In Germany, there are four bonus tracks.)

In May 2009, Hussey announced on the Mission's website and in an interview on BBC Radio 6 Music that he and Julianne Regan were in a relationship, and working together on an album of cover versions, reinterpretations of old material and new songs, and invited fans to suggest songs for the duo to cover. This album was eventually released in the autumn of 2011 as Curios under the name Hussey-Regan on Cherry Red Records. In 2014, he released his second solo studio album, Songs of Candlelight & Razorblades, of largely acoustic songs.

In August 2020, Hussey re-recorded "Tower of Strength" as ReMission International TOS 2020, in support of key workers dealing with COVID-19 globally. All proceeds went to charities personally chosen by each contributor to TOS2020. On this project Wayne collaborated with friends and musicians, including Michael Ciravolo, Andy Rourke of the Smiths, Billy Duffy of the Cult, Budgie of Siouxsie and the Banshees, Evi Vine, Gary Numan, James Alexander Graham of the Twilight Sad, Jay Aston of Bucks Fizz, Julianne Regan of All About Eve, Kevin Haskins of Bauhaus, Lol Tolhurst of the Cure, Martin Gore of Depeche Mode, Michael Aston of Gene Loves Jezebel, Midge Ure of Ultravox, Miles Hunt of the Wonder Stuff, Rachel Goswell of Slowdive, Richard Fortus of Guns N' Roses, Robin Finck of Nine Inch Nails, Tim Palmer, Trentemøller and Kirk Brandon of Theatre of Hate and Spear of Destiny.

== Equipment ==
When playing live solo, Hussey uses a Martin D42. When playing live with the band, Hussey currently uses a Schecter Corsair 12-string. In the studio, he uses both a Fender Telecaster and Fender Starcaster.

== Discography ==
=== Dead or Alive ===
- It's Been Hours Now EP (1982)
- The Stranger/Some of That (1982)
- Sophisticated Boom Boom (1984)

=== The Sisters of Mercy ===
- Body and Soul (1984)
- Walk Away (1984)
- No Time to Cry (1985)
- First and Last and Always (1985)

=== The Mission ===
- God's Own Medicine (1986)
- The First Chapter (1987)
- Children (1988)
- Carved in Sand (February 1990)
- Grains of Sand (November 1990)
- Masque (1992)
- Neverland (1995)
- Blue (1996)
- Aura (2001)
- God Is a Bullet (2007)
- Dum Dum Bullet (2011)
- The Brightest Light (2013)
- Another Fall from Grace (2016)

=== Solo ===
- Bare (2008)
- Songs of Candlelight and Razorblades (2014)

=== Guthrie Handley with Wayne Hussey ===
- "Where Was?" (single) (1987)

=== Stisch featuring Wayne Hussey ===
- "Hit Repeat" (single) (2008)

=== Wayne Hussey and Julianne Regan ===
- Curios (2011)

=== Wayne Hussey and James Bacon ===
- As Irmãs Siamesas (Portuguese: The Siamese Sisters) (2018)

=== Wayne Hussey and the Divine ===
- Live at the Yellow Arch (2020)

=== ReMission International ===
- TOS2020 (single) (2020)
