= Sohodolls =

English electronic music band

- Origin: London, England
- Genres: Electropunk; electronic rock; glam rock; alternative rock
- Years active: 2003–2010; 2014; 2020–present
- Labels: A&G; Filthy Pretty; Vanaheim; Dreamphone
- Members: Maya von Doll; Toni Sailor; Weston Doll (Steven Weston); Matt Lord; Paul Stone
- Past members: Ana Doll; Gavin Jay; Pato
- Website: sohodolls.backstreetmerch.com

Sohodolls (initially spelled Soho Dolls as two words) are an English electropunk band from London. The group was formed in 2003 and, following various line-up changes, consists of Maya von Doll (vocals), Toni Sailor (guitar), Weston Doll (Steven Weston) (keyboards), Matt Lord (double bass) and Paul Stone (drums).

The band have described their sound as a cross between "decaying and desperate glamour" and "savagery and sex". Their debut album Ribbed Music for the Numb Generation was released through A&G Records in September 2007.

== Biography ==
=== Early years and rise in popularity: 2003-2006 ===
Soho Dolls were formed in 2003 as an all-female band, with their first line-up consisting of Ana Doll (Ana Q), Maya Von Doll (Maya Hawie) and Pato (Pato Munich). In 2004, Maya von Doll recruited guitarists Toni Sailor (Sailor Doll) and Gavin Jay after they attended a performance at the Rhythm Factory in London, setting the layer of the second line-up. The band would also release its demo CD, Ribbed Music for the Numb Generation. Their debut single "Prince Harry" would be released on 15 November 2004 through Poptones. This would be followed up with "Stripper" in 2005 through Loser Friendly Records, by which point the spelling of the band's name was altered to Sohodolls.

In mid-2006, soon after releasing their second single "Pleasures of Soho", both Gavin Jay and Sammi Doll decided to part ways with the Sohodolls. Wanting to explore more additions to the group in instruments, Maya and Toni found Steven Weston (Weston Doll) who took over the role on keyboards/synths. They then hired Paul Stone and Matt Lord to play drums and double bass, giving the group its third and current line-up. They also signed to A&G Records around this time.

The band's first two singles, "Prince Harry" and "Stripper", caused enough of a stir to reach numbers seven and twelve on the UK Indie Chart. These were followed by another release of "Stripper", "No Regrets" and then "Right and Right Again", which won acclaim from The Fly to Clash and NME. They began writing and recording their debut album in 2006 with producers Robert Harder (Babyshambles, The Sunshine Underground) and Steve Lyon (The Clash, Depeche Mode). In October 2006, the band released a download-only single, "No Regrets". Throughout 2006, Sohodolls attracted more attention, touring with She Wants Revenge during July, performing at Playboy Russia's annual Playmate of the Year party in Moscow in August, The Big Issue's 15th-anniversary concert in September, and two UK tours as well as international dates in Los Angeles, Germany, France, Italy, Spain, Belgium and Istanbul.

=== Ribbed Music for the Numb Generation: 2007-2010 ===
Their debut album, Ribbed Music for the Numb Generation (whose title was reused from the 2004 demo), was released in September 2007, preceded by the single download-only single "My Vampire" and fully released single "Right and Right Again". The album also contains five of the group's previous singles, including the two album-release singles & five newly recorded tracks made specifically for the album. it was also supported by an extensive 35-date headline tour of the UK.

In 2008, Ribbed Music for the Numb Generation was released in Japan, with new cover art and two bonus tracks, a cover of the Hanoi Rocks song "Dead by X-Mas" and a Crystal Castles remix of "Stripper". It would be released in Singapore and Malaysia the following year, with the original UK cover art and featuring several remixes as bonus tracks.

Their 2006 single "Stripper" was used in the American television series Gossip Girl when one of the main characters, Blair Waldorf (Leighton Meester) stripped to it in episode "Victor, Victrola", which aired on 7 November 2007 on The CW. The band was again featured in Gossip Girl when their song, "I'm Not Cool", played during the episode "In the Realm of the Basses" when Blair confronts Chuck in the Victrola club.

Their music also appeared in the 2011 video game Test Drive Unlimited 2, with the Allister Whitehead club remix of "Right and Right Again" rotating on the Hariba Radio in-game radio station and "Bang Bang Bang Bang" playing both on the RoadRock in-game radio station and also during the carwash scene.

Sohodolls' final concert took place on 29 October 2010 at the EBS Space in Seoul, South Korea. Following the show, the band quietly disbanded, and their official website was soon after relaunched as Von Doll's personal blog.

=== Maya von Doll's solo career, Mayday and New Pharaohs: 2011-2019 ===
Von Doll's solo song "Play My Way" was featured in the third episode of the fifth season of Gossip Girl, titled "The Jewel of Denial" and originally aired 10 October 2011. On the same day, the track was released digitally by Quid Records.

On 18 July 2012, von Doll released "Open Cheque Book", a rewrite of an unreleased Sohodolls track from 2008 which had been performed often during the band's twilight years.

On 28 February 2014, Sohodolls released a new EP, titled Mayday, containing 3 new songs. This was the first new material to be released under the name since 2008. Later that year, on 28 July, the band released another new single, "Talk of the Town". These two songs would be the last new material released under the Sohodolls name until 2021. Around this time, the Sohodolls website's historic domain expired and was used for unrelated content by a third party.

In 2015, Maya von Doll started a new band called New Pharaohs. The band released their debut and only album Antelias in 2018. They had previously released the tracks "Empire", "This Changes Everything" and "Nothing Without You" as singles in 2015 and 2016.

=== Viral resurgence, reformation and Uh Oh: 2020-present ===
During late 2020, their song "Bang Bang Bang Bang" became a popular song on TikTok. Due to their newfound popularity Sohodolls released remasters for both songs, "Stripper" on 22 October 2020 and "Bang Bang Bang Bang" on 18 February 2021. The words to "Bang Bang Bang Bang" had been written as a poem when von Doll was 17, before being adapted to music and released on Ribbed Music ten years later.

After the release of the "Stripper" and "Bang Bang Bang Bang" remasters, Sohodolls released charity single "Period" on 4 March 2021, in partnership with Period Poverty to raise money to provide feminine products to girls and women in refugee camps or in otherwise deprived areas.

On 30 April, Sohodolls released their song "Shut Your Pretty Mouth" on streaming services after the song's demo had leaked on YouTube, however, the song was not completely new, as it had been played in clubs in London sometime in 2009 and also appeared on the band's 2003 demo CD, also titled Ribbed Music for the Numb Generation, alongside early versions of "Prince Harry" and "Weekender".

On 18 June 2021, the band released their song "Silent War".

On 17 September 2021, the band released their song "Snakes & Ladders", which received a music video.

On 23 September 2022, the band released their song "Letter to My Ex", which also received a music video.

On 28 October 2022, the band released their song "Bad." The song had been performed live in 2009 under the title "Load".

10 March 2023 saw the band release "Bang Bang Bang Bang (Kill the Gun)", a grunge-influenced remake of "Bang Bang Bang Bang". The line "hold the gun" in the chorus was also changed to "kill the gun" - Von Doll explained this as not wanting to be seen as endorsing school shootings.

On 29 February 2024, the band released their song "What Kinda Love". They would follow this up with "Mother Wouldn't Like It" on 19 April

On 16 May 2024, the band released the 4-track EP "Queen of Spades", containing the songs "Queen of Spades", "Mother Wouldn't Like It", and "What Kinda Love". The EP also included a radio edit of "Queen of Spades". The title track dates back to 2008.

On 21 June 2024, the band released their song "Napoleon Baby".

On 16 August 2024, the band released a 6-track EP "Territory of Your Heart", containing the 4 songs from "Queen of Spades" as well as "Napoleon Baby" and one new track, "Territory of Your Heart".

On 25 October 2024, the band released a 7-track album "Tear You Apart", consisting of the 6 songs from "Queen of Spades" and one new song "Tear You Apart".

On 29 November 2024, the band released an 8-track album "Thread", consisting of the 7 songs from Queen of Spades" and one new song "Thread", which came with a music video.

On 31 January 2025, the band released their song "My Religion".

On 30 May 2025, the band released their song "Last Night Was a Mistake" as well as a lyric video.

On 17 October 2025, the band released their song "Fix Me", which got a music video.

On 12 December 2025, the band released a 13-track album "Uh Oh", consisting of the 8 songs from "Thread", as well as "Fix Me', "Last Night Was a Mistake", "My Religion", and the previously released songs "Bad" and "Letter to My Ex".

On 7 August 2026, the band released "Sin With You", a demo recording from 2008. This would be followed up on 16 October with "Black Gold", another recording from the era.

== Tours ==
As well as having toured the UK seven times the band have also played in Japan, Korea (International Rock Festival at Pusan Beach), Moscow, Los Angeles, Istanbul, Rome, Berlin, Paris, Barcelona, Vienna, Brussels, Hamburg, Madrid, Pisa, Cologne, Oslo, Munich, Weinheim, Frankfurt, Freiburg and have toured widely in the UK, often playing towns off the beaten circuit. They have also toured with/supported IAMX, Ladytron, Klaxons, Daft Punk, Vive la Fête, She Wants Revenge, The Magic Numbers, Hanoi Rocks, Apoptygma Berzerk, and Marilyn Manson.

To promote the release of their debut album Ribbed Music for the Numb Generation, Sohodolls embarked on their biggest tour to date. Starting at Hoxton Bar & Grill, London, on 4 September 2007, they headlined 34 venues across the UK.

== Influences ==
Sohodolls have drawn inspiration from the electronic bands Depeche Mode, Kraftwerk and OMD. Their music has also been partly informed by Peaches, Miss Kittin and Fischerspooner.

== Discography ==
=== Albums ===
- Ribbed Music for the Numb Generation (2007)
- Uh Oh (2025)

=== Extended plays ===
- Ribbed Music for the Numb Generation demo EP (2003)
- Prince Harry EP (2005)
- Mayday EP (2014)
- Queen of Spades EP (2024)

=== Singles ===
Title	Year	Peak chart positions	Album/EP
Title	Year	UK	Album/EP
"Prince Harry"	2004	57 (Note: "Prince Harry" also charted at 57 on the Physical Singles Chart and at 7 on the Independent Singles Chart)	Ribbed Music for the Numb Generation
"Stripper"	2005	86 (Note: "Stripper" also charted at 62 on the Physical Singles Chart and 12 on the Independent Singles Chart)	Ribbed Music for the Numb Generation
"No Regrets"	2006	—	Ribbed Music for the Numb Generation
"Right and Right Again"	2007	—	Ribbed Music for the Numb Generation
"Bang Bang Bang Bang"	2007	—	Ribbed Music for the Numb Generation
"Talk of the Town"	2014	—	Non-album singles
"Period"	2021	—	Non-album singles
"Shut Your Pretty Mouth"	2021	—	Non-album singles
"Silent War"	2021	—	Non-album singles
"Snakes & Ladders"	2021	—	Non-album singles
"Letter to My Ex (Thank You, Goodbye)"	2022	—	Non-album singles
"Bad"	2022	—	Non-album singles
"Merry Xmas Everybody"	2022	—	Non-album singles
"It's Electro (Open Checkbook)"	2023	—	Non-album singles
"Here She Comes (Emmeline)"	2023	—	Non-album singles
"Hold Me Back"	2023	—	Non-album singles
"—" denotes releases that did not chart.

=== Maya von Doll's solo singles ===
- "Play My Way" (2011)
- "Open Chequebook" (2012)
- "Is This Love" (featuring Robs & Duke) (2012)

"Open Chequebook" had been performed at latter-day Sohodolls gigs between 2008 and 2010.
