= The Weathermen (band) =

Belgian electronic and pop group

The Weathermen are a semi-satirical Belgium-based electronic and pop band.

== History ==
The Weathermen began as a joke. A couple of Americano-Belgians recorded some music and then sent it to a local record company via the US under the pretence they were a couple of enigmatic Americans trying to invade the European music scene. It worked and they were signed to Play It Again Sam (PIAS) Records who put out their first 12" "Old Friend Sam" in 1985. They recruited the assistance of Tuxedomoon's visual specialist Bruce Geduldig who adopted the alias of Chuck B, a debauched playboy vocalist. He brought even more humour and satire to the already amused Weathermen. The name "The Weathermen" was inspired from a line in famous folk/rock artist, Bob Dylan's song "Subterranean Homesick Blues" in which a line goes "you don't need a weatherman to know which way the wind blows"

More singles followed, moving the band away from alternative dancey electronic music into slightly satirical poppy EBM music, but it wasn't until 1987 that the song "Poison" brought them real attention. With tracks such as "Punishment Park", the Black Album as a whole was like the soundtrack of a dark and tongue-in-cheek movie, something like the Marx Brothers remixing William Gibson. By this time, the group had slimmed down to 'Chuck' and 'Jimmy-Joe Snark III'; who was actually mild-mannered producer and keyboardist Jean-Marc Lederman who had worked with the likes of Fad Gadget, The The and Kid Montana.

The band continued in the vein of tongue-in-cheek pop, leaving behind their early harder sound, but they failed to repeat the success of "Poison" on a commercial level.

In 2001, a best of album was almost released by PIAS. Due to frustration and demands from the fanbase and a new generation who had discovered their music through research into other renowned Belgian acts such as Front 242 and A Split-Second, Jimmyjoe Snark III decided to reclaim the album from PIAS and publish it via a website. The only demands made on those downloading it being that they leave a comment in the guestbook. This brought a new legion of fans and enough interest for Jimmy-Joe & Chuck to be thawed out of storage for the creation of some new music.

The album Deeper with The Weathermen was released in 2004, followed by Embedded with The Weathermen in 2006.

In 2007, PIAS released The Last Communiqué from The Weathermen, a compilation of their work from 1985 till 2006.

In 2010, Infacted Recordings released Ultimate Poison, a 15 tracks MCD loosely based around "Poison" and all its remixes, plus some unreleased tracks.

== Members ==
- Jimmy-Joe Snark III AKA Jean-Marc Lederman – keyboards, programming, production
- Chuck B AKA Bruce Geduldig – vocals
- Michel Van Gysel – keyboards, drums and production on early EP's (up to " The Third Communiqué")
- Paul Zahl - drums on live tours from 1989

== Discography ==
=== Singles and 12" EP ===
- Old Friend Sam (1985)
- Deep Down South (1985)
- This Is the Third Communique (Berlin) (1986)
- Take It Off! (1986)
- Poison (1987)
- Punishment Park (1988)
- Bang! (1989)
- Heatseeker (1990)
- Once for the Living (1990)
- Around the World (1992)
- Daytime TV (2005)
- Ultimate Poison EP (2010)

=== Studio albums ===
- Ten Deadly Kisses (1986)
- The Black Album According to The Weathermen (1988)
- Beyond the Beyond (1990)
- Global 851 (1992)
- Deeper with The Weathermen (2004)
- Embedded with The Weathermen (2006)

=== Compilation albums ===
- The Last Communiqué from The Weathermen (2007)

== See also ==
- Electronic music
- Electronic body music
- Pop music
