= Live and Electric at the Union Chapel =

Live album by All About Eve
- Released: 8 October 2001
- Label: JamTart
- Producer: All About Eve

All About Eve chronology
Fairy Light Nights 2 (2001)	Live and Electric at the Union Chapel (2001)	Return to Eden (2002)

Professional ratings
Review scores
Source	Rating
Allmusic	3/5 stars

Live and Electric at The Union Chapel is a live album by All About Eve, recorded at their Union Chapel concert on 9 December 2000. It was released as both a standard version, and as a limited edition double CD, the second CD containing three more tracks from the same concert.

== Track listing ==
1. "Lady Moonlight"
2. "Freeze"
3. "Wishing the Hours Away"
4. "Martha's Harbour"
5. "Wild Hearted Woman"
6. "In the Clouds"
7. "Miss World"
8. "Are You Lonely"
9. "December"
10. "Forever"
11. "More Than the Blues"
12. "You Bring Your Love to Me"
13. "Shelter from the Rain"
14. "What Kind of Fool"
15. "Outshine the Sun"

The second CD contains:

1. "Never Promise Anyone Forever"
2. "Scarlet"
3. "Farewell Mr. Sorrow"
