= Mark Price (musician) =

English drummer

Mark Gerard Price (born 10 August 1959, in Nelson, Lancashire) is an English drummer known for being a member of Nik Kershaw's band, All About Eve and Del Amitri.

== Early life ==
Mark Price grew up in Nelson, Lancashire and attended Walton High School, Burnley College of Art, and Manchester Polytechnic where he graduated in Graphic Design, moving to London in 1980.

== Career ==
=== Nik Kershaw ===
Price joined Nik Kershaw's band in 1983, touring for the next four years, including playing at Live Aid in 1985.

=== All About Eve ===
Price was recruited to All About Eve in 1987, during the recording of their first album. He did play on the majority of songs, but others featured the Mission's Mick Brown. He remained with the band and featured on their next three albums until they split up in 1993. He briefly carried on with Marty Willson-Piper and Andy Cousin to create the one-off album Seeing Stars, and recorded with Julianne Regan's side project Mice.

=== The Cure ===
Following the departure of drummer Boris Williams, Price played on "Mint Car", "Trap" and "Treasure" on the Cure's Wild Mood Swings album, and on the B-Side "A Pink Dream". Another drummer, Jason Cooper, was ultimately chosen as Williams' permanent replacement.

=== Del Amitri ===
In 1997, Price joined Del Amitri. He toured extensively with them and appears on the 2002 album Can You Do Me Good? and the top 40 hit singles "Don't Come Home Too Soon" (1998), "Cry to Be Found" (1998) and "Just Before You Leave" (2002).

=== All About Eve reunion ===
Price played the drums for the All About Eve reunion tour in 1999, but he stayed with Del Amitri, and so All About Eve carried on without him, initially touring acoustically and then recruiting a series of other drummers.

== See also ==
- List of drummers
