= Andy Cousin =

British musician

Andrew Cousin (born 28 June 1963 in Lincoln) is an English bassist and radio presenter from Mirfield in England. He is principally known for being the bassist of All About Eve and he has also played for The Mission. Since 2016, he presents the Andy Cousin show on Deal Radio.

== Before All About Eve (pre-1985) ==
In the early 1980s, Cousin played bass in Huddersfield for goth band Aemotti Crii, along with friend Tim Bricheno. Cousin remained with Aemotti Crii until they split up (circa 1984) and then moved down London for a very brief spell with a synthpop band called Pink and Black, appearing on one of their record covers despite not having played on any of the tracks.

== All About Eve first era (1985–1992) ==
Bricheno had left Aemotti Crii and become a member of All About Eve: following the departure of bassist James Jackson, he invited Cousin to join. Cousin became the mainstay bassist, playing on all four of their albums of the era and remaining with the band after Bricheno departed in 1990.

== Seeing Stars (1993) ==
Many fans of the band's early sound reacted negatively to the new direction which the band were taking, and poor sales of the fourth album, Ultraviolet, caused the band to be dropped by their label, MCA. Cousin, along with drummer Mark Price and guitarist Marty Willson-Piper, remained in the studio to complete work on songs which had been intended for All About Eve's fifth album. These songs were eventually released in 1997 as Seeing Stars.

== The Mission (1993–1997) ==
In late 1993, Cousin joined The Mission after original bassist Craig Adams departed to join The Cult. Cousin played on two albums, Neverland and Blue, before the band split up.

During this time, Cousin also played as a session musician on two songs by Mice, a band created by Regan that existed between 1995 and 1997.

== The Lucy Nation (1997–present) ==
Cousin formed The Lucy Nation with Swedish singer and pianist Anna Nyström (who had also guested on Seeing Stars). This band recorded one album, On in early 1999 (although only promotional copies were ever distributed) and had one song, "Alright", featured on the soundtrack of the film Austin Powers: The Spy Who Shagged Me.

== All About Eve second era (1999 – present) ==
At the time The Mission were reforming in 1999, Wayne Hussey asked Cousin to broach with Regan the subject of reforming All About Eve to perform as support band on the Mission's tour. Following some successful live performances, All About Eve stayed together as a semi-acoustic three piece (comprising Cousin, Regan and Willson-Piper) and, with the addition of a drummer, as a fully electric band. Cousin remained with the band throughout their second era, including the Fairy Light Nights period and the departure of Willson-Piper in 2002. Alongside Regan, Cousin co-produced the mini-album Iceland. In mid-2004, shortly after the release of their first single in a decade, "Let Me Go Home", the band split once again following various disagreements between Cousin and Regan, although this rift appeared to have been temporarily healed as All About Eve's major compilation Keepsakes was released with collaboration from both in early 2006.
