= Keepsakes (album) =

Album by All About Eve

Keepsakes - A Collection

Compilation album by All About Eve
- Released: 13 March 2006
- Labels: Mercury, Universal
- Producer: Julian Fernandez

All About Eve chronology
Cinemasonic (2003)	Keepsakes - A Collection (2006)

Keepsakes - A Collection is an anthology by All About Eve released on 13 March 2006. It is available either as a double CD or as a limited edition double CD and DVD set (the DVD containing the band's videos and television performances).

The "infamous" version of "Martha's Harbour" was a Top of the Pops performance featuring just Julianne Regan and Tim Bricheno which - as was usual BBC policy at the time - was mimed. However, the backing tape wasn't played to the performers, which meant that they couldn't hear what they were supposed to be miming to - whereas the television audience could hear the song with the two of them just sitting there. They pick the song up mid-way through the second verse, when someone realised the mistake.

== Track listing ==
First CD:

1. Flowers in Our Hair (extended version)
2. In the Clouds
3. Calling Your Name
4. Paradise (1989 remix)
5. Martha's Harbour
6. Every Angel (7" remix)
7. What Kind of Fool (Autumn Rhapsody)
8. Wild Flowers (1988 BBC session version)
9. Candy Tree (Live at the Hammersmith Odeon 1988)
10. Wild Hearted Woman (Live at the Hammersmith Odeon 1988)
11. Our Summer (Live)
12. In the Meadow (Live at the Hammersmith Odeon 1988)
13. Gold and Silver
14. Scarlet
15. Road to Your Soul
16. Drowning
17. December
18. What Kind of Fool 2006
19. The Empty Dancehall - Revisited

Second CD:

1. Farewell Mr Sorrow
2. Strange Way
3. Rhythm of Life
4. Wishing the Hours Away
5. The Dreamer (Tim Palmer Mix)
6. Touched by Jesus
7. Are You Lonely
8. See Emily Play (Demo Version)
9. Phased
10. Freeze
11. I Don't Know (Alternate Version)
12. Some Finer Day
13. Infrared
14. Outshine the Sun
15. Let Me Go Home
16. Keepsakes
17. Raindrops

DVD (only available on limited edition version):

1. Flowers in Our Hair (video)
2. In the Clouds (video)
3. Wild Hearted Woman (video)
4. Every Angel (video)
5. Martha's Harbour (video)
6. What Kind of Fool (video)
7. Road to Your Soul (video)
8. December (video)
9. Scarlet (video)
10. Farewell Mr Sorrow (video)
11. Strange Way (video)
12. The Dreamer (video)
13. Phased (video)
14. Some Finer Day (video)
15. Let Me Go Home (video)
16. Every Angel (performed for Going Live! in 1988)
17. Martha's Harbour (performed (live) for Top of the Pops in 1988)
18. What Kind of Fool (performed for Top of the Pops in 1988)
19. Scarlet (performed for Daytime Live in 1990)
20. More Than the Blues (performed for Daytime Live in 1990)
21. Farewell Mr Sorrow (performed for Top of the Pops in 1991)

The DVD also features two Easter Eggs:

1. Martha's Harbour (performed (mimed) for Top of the Pops in 1988 - the "infamous" version [see notes])
2. What Kind of Fool (an alternate version of the video deemed suitable for children as it does not feature tarot cards)
