= All About Eve (band) =

English rock band

- Also known as: The Swarm
- Origin: England
- Genres: Alternative rock; gothic rock; folk rock; dream pop; shoegaze; post-punk; dark wave
- Years active: 1984–1993; 1999–2004
- Labels: Mercury; Vertigo; MCA; JamTart
- Past members: Julianne Regan; Andy Cousin; Tim Bricheno; Mark Price; Marty Willson-Piper; James Richard Jackson; Manuela Zwingmann; Warne Livesey; Rik Carter; Del Hood; Robin Guy; Toni Haimi; Ben Savigear

All About Eve were an English rock band. The initial creative core consisted of Coventry-born Julianne Regan (vocals), Huddersfield-born Tim Bricheno (guitar) and Andy Cousin (bass guitar), with other members changing over the years. Their highest-charting UK single was "Martha's Harbour" (1988). The band was active from 1984 to 1993, then 1999 to 2004, achieving four UK Top-50 albums. The band had been recognised for their "unique, folk-rock-influenced take" on the gothic rock style, and Regan was described by AllMusic as "certainly one of the more talented singers of the British gothic rock scene in the late 1980s.

== History ==
=== Foundation ===
Julianne Regan, a former journalist, played bass in an early line-up of the gothic rock group Gene Loves Jezebel before leaving to form, with Manuela Zwingmann of Xmal Deutschland, The Swarm, the precursor to All About Eve. The band's name was taken from the 1950 film starring Bette Davis. The original line-up of All About Eve consisted of Regan, Zwingmann, former Aemotti Crii guitarist Bricheno and bassist Gus Ferguson. The band released the independent single "D for Desire" in 1985, prior to Zwingmann and Ferguson leaving, the latter joining Test Department. Bricheno suggested Cousin as a replacement for Ferguson, and so as a three-piece (plus a drum machine), they released "In the Clouds" (1986) and "Flowers in Our Hair" (1987). Both singles, "D for Desire" and "In the Clouds", were partially based on an ethereal gothic sound, sometimes compared to the music of the Cocteau Twins and Siouxsie and the Banshees.

After Regan sang backing vocals for The Mission's God's Own Medicine album, the band received greater attention and were signed to Phonogram. Drummer Mark Price was added around this time.

=== Debut and chart success ===
Their self-titled debut album was produced by Paul Samwell-Smith and released in 1988. It includes UK hit singles "In the Clouds", "Wild-Hearted Woman", "Every Angel", "Martha's Harbour", and "What Kind of Fool".

The album itself reached No. 7 on the UK Albums Chart, with much of its lyrical material drawing from hippie ideals, white magic and dreamlike fairy tales. Their music was sometimes considered gothic rock by the media.

The band later performed a dubbed version of "Martha's Harbour" on the BBC television music show Top of the Pops, but, owing to a studio technical error, the taped vocals were broadcast without the band being able to hear them, resulting in the audience of BBC1 hearing the recorded version of the song, while the band members sat motionless on screen waiting for their cue to begin. By way of compensation, the band were invited back on to the show to perform the song the following week, this time with the vocals performed live. This performance passed off smoothly, with the resultant publicity helping the track to climb the singles chart.

The following year, their second album, Scarlet and Other Stories, was released and the band toured around the UK. It also reached the top 10 of the UK Albums Chart.

=== Activity through the 1990s ===
In 1990, Bricheno left the group (later to join The Sisters of Mercy for their Vision Thing era, and subsequent bands XC-NN and Tin Star) to be replaced by The Church's Marty Willson-Piper. They went on to record Touched by Jesus in 1991 (which featured David Gilmour of Pink Floyd on guitar on two tracks), which made the UK Top 20, before changing record labels and releasing Ultraviolet, the year after. Released by MCA it reached UK No. 46. The band continued working on new material for a prospective fifth album, but Regan soon left. Although remaining members continued for a couple more months without Regan's input, they disbanded in early 1993, with the album they had been working on being subsequently released under the group name Seeing Stars.

Regan went on to form Mice, and to work with Bernard Butler, and she teamed up with Jean-Marc Lederman in the Jules et Jim project.

In 1993, bassist Cousin went on to join a reformed Mission, touring extensively and contributing to their albums Neverland (1995) and Blue (1996) before the band again split.

In 1999, Hussey reformed the Mission yet again and although there was no room in the line-up for Cousin (bass duties being taken by the band's original bassist, Craig Adams) Cousin was asked to approach Regan to invite her to reform All About Eve to open for them. The offer was accepted and the band reformed, with a line-up of Regan, Cousin, Willson-Piper, plus Ric Carter (who had been in the Mission with Cousin) on guitars/keyboards and Del Hood on drums. This line-up toured during 2000 and 2001, releasing a live album Live and Electric at the Union Chapel. In addition, Regan, Willson-Piper and Cousin toured as a pared down, mainly acoustic trio for two years, releasing live albums Fairy Light Nights in 2000, and Fairy Light Nights Volume 2 in 2001.

In 2002, Willson-Piper left the band to pursue other projects, to be replaced by new guitarist Toni Haimi, previously of the band Malluka and currently a member of the Sohodolls. Later that year, All About Eve released the live album and DVD Cinemasonic with a line-up of Regan, Cousin, Haimi, Carter and Hood. A collection of early recordings was also released, entitled Return to Eden, Vol. 1: The Early Recordings.

Also in 2002, Regan and Cousin released their first studio recordings in a decade, with the EP Iceland; a collection of 'winter songs', including reworkings of "December" and cover versions of Wham!'s "Last Christmas", Queen's "A Winter's Tale", and "Walking in the Air". (In the original "December" single, of 1989, there was a cover version of "The Witch's Promise", from Jethro Tull).

=== Latter days ===
Carter and Hood departed, with Ben Savigear taking over on drums. In mid-2004, shortly after the release of their first single in a decade, "Let Me Go Home", the band split once again. Their last gig, with a line-up of Regan, Cousin, Haimi and Savigear, was at the Mean Fiddler in London on 30 April 2004, at the end of a British tour; this was filmed and copies of the performance were made available through a fan website.

Regan latterly worked with The Eden House, In April 2009, Regan stated on her Facebook page: "All About Eve are dormant and may never happen again. I don't ever like to say never though, but it seems we've all moved on and are exploring other avenues."

A double CD collection entitled Keepsakes, consisting of the singles, key album tracks and previously unreleased rarities, as well as some newly recorded songs, was released in early March 2006, and was initially available with a DVD of the promo videos and TV appearances.

=== 2019 ===
In commemoration of the 50th anniversary of the Apollo 11 Moon landing on 20 July, Regan and Bricheno created a video and song called "Pale Blue Earth". The pair released another song and video on 31 October 2019, called "Seance".

=== 2021 ===
Drummer Del Hood died in 2021. An obituary appeared in The Guardian.

=== 2023 ===
Julianne Regan and Tim Bricheno released a new two-track single, featuring the traditional Christmas songs "In the Bleak Midwinter" and "The Snows They Melt the Soonest".

=== 2024 ===
Regan & Bricheno released a 10-track album, Apparitions, on 3 May via their Bandcamp channel.

Drummer Robin Guy died from cancer on 12 September 2024, at the age of 54.

== Discography ==
- All About Eve (1988)
- Scarlet and Other Stories (1989)
- Touched by Jesus (1991)
- Ultraviolet (1992)

== Bibliography ==
- Roach, Martin (1993). The Mission; Names are for tombstones, baby. Independent Music Press. ISBN 1-897-78301-9.
