= Marty Willson-Piper =

English guitarist and singer-songwriter

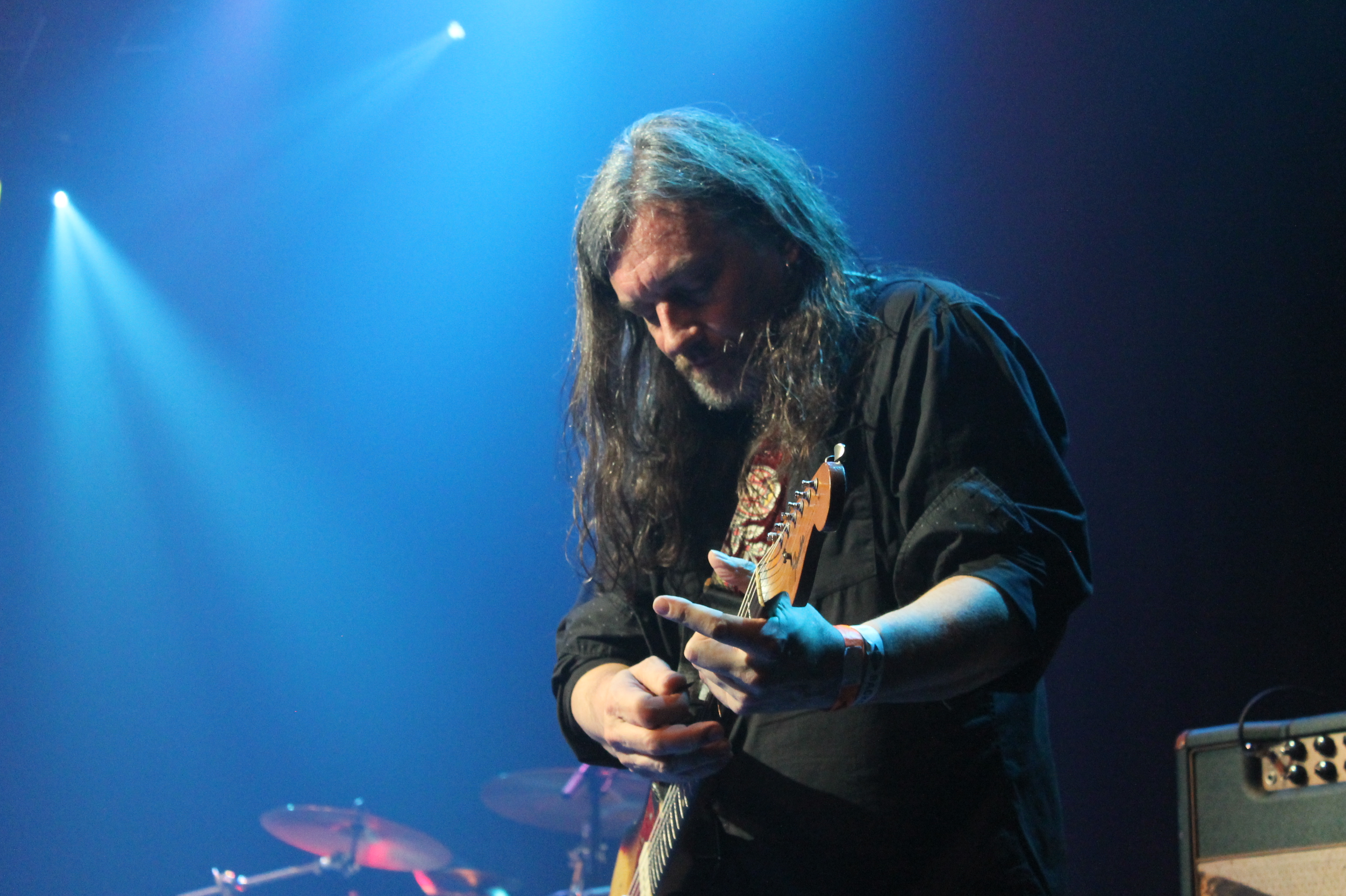
- Willson-Piper in 2016

Background information
- Born: 7 May 1958 (age 68); Stockport, Cheshire, England
- Genre: Rock
- Instruments: Guitar; vocals; bass guitar
- Years active: 1972–present
- Labels: Um & Ah; Survival; Festival; Rykodisc; Heydey; Second Motion; Schoolkids
- Formerly of: The Church; All About Eve; The Saints; Noctorum; Anekdoten
- Website: martywillson-piper.com

Martin Howard Willson-Piper (born 7 May 1958) known as Marty Willson-Piper is an English guitarist and singer-songwriter famous for his work as a former long-time member of the Australian ARIA Hall of Fame inductees, psychedelic rock band The Church. He joined in 1980 after seeing an early gig where they were performing as a three-piece. He was an integral member of the band for 33 years. He was also the guitarist for the English alternative rock band All About Eve from 1991 to 1993 and again from 1999 to 2002. He has also worked with Swedish progressive rock band Anekdoten and has collaborated with Linda Perry, Jules Shear, Tom Verlaine, Charlie Sexton, Aimee Mann, Brix Smith, and Rob Dickinson amongst others.

== Early life ==
Willson-Piper was born in Stockport, Cheshire, on 7 May 1958 and grew up as a teenager in Thingwall. He has a brother and an adopted sister. When he was three years old the family moved from Compstall where his parents had a pub called The Commercial. Around 1970, the family moved to Birch Vale in Derbyshire, a small village between New Mills and Hayfield, where his parents took on another pub. They later moved to Thingwall.

At 14 he was taught the guitar by his brother, who was a member of a cabaret band. Willson-Piper soon started his own band with school friends. After leaving school at 16, Willson-Piper worked various jobs. He soon travelled to mainland Europe busking outside train stations and working odd jobs such as grape collecting.

He moved to Australia in April 1980. Willson-Piper went along to see an early performance of The Church and was asked to join the band a few days before his 22nd birthday in May 1980.

== The Church ==
On 6 May 1980, Willson-Piper joined The Church on guitar, vocals and bass guitar, alongside Steve Kilbey, Peter Koppes and Nick Ward. Willson-Piper's sound was influenced by guitarists such as Tom Verlaine and Bill Nelson.

Willson-Piper contributed to most of the Church's studio releases and was a member almost continuously from 1980 to 2013. The only exception is the 1997 album Pharmakoi/Distance-Crunching Honchos with Echo Units, which only featured Kilbey, Koppes and drummer Tim Powles and was released as by "The Refo:mation".

In 2013, Kilbey announced on the band's Facebook page that former Powderfinger guitarist Ian Haug had replaced Willson-Piper.

== Solo career and Noctorum ==
Willson-Piper has maintained a steady solo output since the mid-1980s, releasing six solo studio albums and three live solo albums.

Four of his albums are collaborations with long-time friend Dare Mason (who has produced and played on Willson-Piper's solo releases) under the name Noctorum.

In September 2015, Willson-Piper's band Acres Of Space embarked on a tour of the United States. During the spring and summer of 2016, Acres of Space toured the Eastern half of the United States. In December 2016 / January 2017 Acres Of Space played four shows in Chile.

== In Deep Music Archive ==
Willson-Piper is an avid record collector. His music archive, the In Deep Music Archive (named after Argent's 1973 album In Deep), is an eclectic collection of music in many forms. An historical and contemporary library of various physical formats: vinyl, CD, cassette, reel to reel tape, 8 track, 78 rpm, VHS, DVD, Laser discs, reference books, encyclopedias, catalogues, biographies and magazines. The archive's digital presence is the In Deep Music Archive website with regular posts about both popular and more obscure artists included in the collection. Collected by Willson-Piper over the past 50 years, the archive has grown into a collection through a life of scouring the record stores around the world, but also through donations from friends, fans and record labels. It currently holds an estimated 50,000 vinyl records and is located in Porto, Portugal.

== Side projects and collaborations (selection) ==
- Willson-Piper appeared on the single "(Just like) Surf City" by James Griffin and the Subterraneans in 1985.
- He produced the 1987 album Blood Red Roses for the band Bell Jar.
- Jules Shear's 1989 album The Third Party consist entirely of one acoustic guitar track, played by Willson-Piper, and one vocal track by Shear.
- Willson-Piper played on several tracks on Tom Verlaine's 1990 album The Wonder, but is uncredited.
- He spent two stints as guitarist for UK rock group All About Eve, playing on their 1991 album Touched By Jesus, 1992's Ultraviolet, Fairy Light Nights 1 & 2, Live and Electric at the Union Chapel in 2001 as well as their Live In Bonn 1991 DVD. He was also in the offshoot band "Seeing Stars".
- With Aimee Mann he co-wrote the song "Could've Been Anyone" and appeared on Mann's first album, 1993's Whatever.
- He wrote "The Sensual Hour" and "Sticks And Stones" in 1994 for The Infidels.
- He was the co-writer of the song "Battersea" for All About Eve singer Julianne Regan's side project Mice in 1996, as well as appearing on the tracks "Miss World" and "Dark Place".
- He played lead guitar on Scratch's 1996 song "We Got Fooled Again".
- He was a co-writer of the song "Knock Me Out" on 4NonBlondes singer Linda Perry's 1996 album In Flight. The song appears on The Crow: City of Angels soundtrack.
- He wrote and produced three tracks (and played on two) for Brix Smith's 1997 album Happy Unbirthday, as well as co-writing and singing on most of the tracks on her 2007 album Neurotica.
- He worked with David Gedge's Cinerama on their first album, 1998's Va Va Voom, and plays on seven tracks.
- He produced seven tracks on album Elvis, Halleluja and Hurrah (1998) for Håkan Ahlström, as well as playing on five of them.
- He produced Justin Clayton's 1999 album Limb and guests on the track "Shallow World".
- For Swedish act Moderna Män, Willson-Piper produced, recorded and mixed their 2000 album, Entré.
- In 2003 Willson-Piper recorded the song "Motorcycle" with Australian band Urban Folk Collective for their album Black Rabbit.
- In 2004 Willson-Piper featured on the tracks "Who Knew the World Would End" and "All Your Kingdom" on Edward Roger's album Sunday Fables and again in 2008 on the follow-up You Haven't Been Where I've Been, on the tracks "Graveyard Voices" and "What Happened To Manfred What Happened To Jane". Willson-Piper plays guitar on the Duncan Brown version of "Alfred Bell" and bass on "Wounded Conversation" on Edward Rogers’ 2017 album TV Generation, co-writing the track "Listen To Me".
- He contributed guitar solos to Rob Dickinson's single "Oceans" (2005) and The Gronk's "Touch the Sun" (2008).
- In 2005, Willson-Piper joined veteran Australian band The Saints to record an album Nothing Is Straight In My House, as well as co-writing the track "Passing Strange". Willson-Piper also joined the band for the subsequent tour.
- In 2006 Willson-Piper performed on the tracks "Martha's Harbour" and "Circle" on the White Rose Transmission album Bewitched And Bewildered.
- Willson-Piper recorded the duet "Beatles and Stones" with Norwegian singer Marte Heggelund in 2008, for her album Treason.
- In 2014 Willson-Piper was part of French band Sweet Gum Tree, recording the album The Snakes You Charm and the Wolves You Tame as well as joining the band for their subsequent tour.
- He makes a guest appearance on Swedish progressive rock band Anekdoten's album entitled Until All The Ghosts Are Gone, released April 2015, and has since joined the band, playing gigs in Japan, Germany, the Netherlands, Italy, Sweden, Norway, France and Armenia.

== Personal life ==
Willson-Piper speaks English and Swedish. He lives in Porto, Portugal.

== Discography ==
=== Albums ===
- In Reflection (1987)
- Art Attack (1988)
- Rhyme (1989)
- Spirit Level (1992)
- Hanging Out in Heaven (2000)
- Nightjar (2008)
- Archaelological Dig Volume 1 (2025)

=== Singles and EPs ===
- She's King (1988)
- "On the Tip of My Tongue" (1988)
- "Questions Without Answers" (1989)
- "Melancholy Girl" (1989)
- Luscious Ghost EP (1992)
- "I Can't Cry" (1992)

=== Live recordings ===
- Live at the Fine Line Cafe (2000)
- Live at the Knitting Factory (2000)
- Live from the Other Side (2004)

=== All About Eve ===
- Touched by Jesus (1991)
- Ultraviolet (1992)

=== Seeing Stars ===
- Seeing Stars (1997)

=== The Saints ===
- Nothing is Straight in My House (2005)

=== Noctorum ===
- Sparks Lane (2004)
- Offer the Light (2006)
- Honey Mink Forever (2011)
- The Afterlife (2019)

=== Other projects ===
- MOAT – MOAT (2013)
- MOAT – Poison Stream (2021)
- Sweet Gum Tree – The Snakes You Charm and the Wolves You Tame (2014)
- Anekdoten – Until All The Ghosts Are Gone (2015)
