= Tim Bricheno =

English guitarist

Tim Bricheno (born Timothy John Bricheno, 6 July 1963, Huddersfield, Yorkshire) is an English guitarist, songwriter and music teacher. He was a member of several notable British indie bands, including All About Eve, The Sisters of Mercy, XC-NN (originally "CNN" until the band ran into legal problems with America's Cable News Network) and Tin Star. He has also played as a tour guest and recorded with The Mission.

Bricheno has written music under several pseudonyms for other recording artists including Dusty Springfield and Gene Pitney. He currently plays in 'Jok', a band formed with ex XC-NN, and former Tin Star vocalist, David Tomlinson. He moved into media composition during the late 1990s.

Bricheno was listed as a songwriting tutor and course author at Middlesex University Hendon, ICMP (Institute of Contemporary Music) and, in 2012, at the Academy of Contemporary Music in Guildford.

In May 2024 Bricheno released the album "Apparitions" together with Julianne Regan (formerly of All About Eve) on Bandcamp. Since 2019, Bricheno has been suffering from Tinnitus.
