= Dead cat =

Dead cat can refer to:

- Dead cat bounce, a stock market phenomenon
- Dead Cat Bounce, a comedy band
- Dead cat strategy, a diversionary tactic in debate or news management
- Dead cat windscreen or dead kitten windscreen, a type of microphone windscreen

== See also ==
- 101 Uses for a Dead Cat, a series of cartoons about dead cats
- DEADCAT (Diethyl azodicarboxylate), an organic compound
- Schrödinger's cat, a physics thought experiment involving the possibility of a cat that is both dead and alive
