= Wag the dog =

Diversional political strategy, often military in nature

Wag the dog is a political term for the act of creating a diversion from a damaging issue usually through military force. The metaphor originally referred to an important or powerful entity (the dog) being controlled by a less important one (the tail). It later became used to describe a type of diversionary foreign policy where military action is used to distract from other issues.

== History ==
A joke about the phrase appears in the 1858 play Our American Cousin, which U.S. president Abraham Lincoln was watching when he was assassinated by actor John Wilkes Booth. In the play, Lord Dundreary is a sympathetic character who constantly utters confused catch phrases known at that time as Dundrearyisms (similar to modern day Yogi-isms of Yogi Berra). He tells the following joke:

Dundreary: "I've got another. Why does a dog waggle his tail?"
Florence: "Upon my word, I never inquired."
Dundreary: "Because the tail can't waggle the dog. Ha! Ha!"

In 1871, an article discussing one Democratic convention references the play, writing:

Calling to mind Lord Dundreary's conundrum, the Baltimore American thinks that for the Cincinnati Convention to control the Democratic party would be the tail wagging the dog.

The phrase was used again in the 1960s, as in the economic advice "don't let the tax tail wag the investment dog".

The term did not gain political popularity until the 1990s, with the success of the 1993 novel Wag the Dog and the 1997 film of the same name. In the film, a sitting U.S. president becomes embroiled in scandal weeks before he is up for re-election, and a spin doctor arranges for a Hollywood producer to fabricate military action to save the campaign. This led to the phrase "wag the dog" becoming used to describe superfluous military actions undertaken to distract from domestic scandals.

== In politics ==
Former U.S. president Bill Clinton

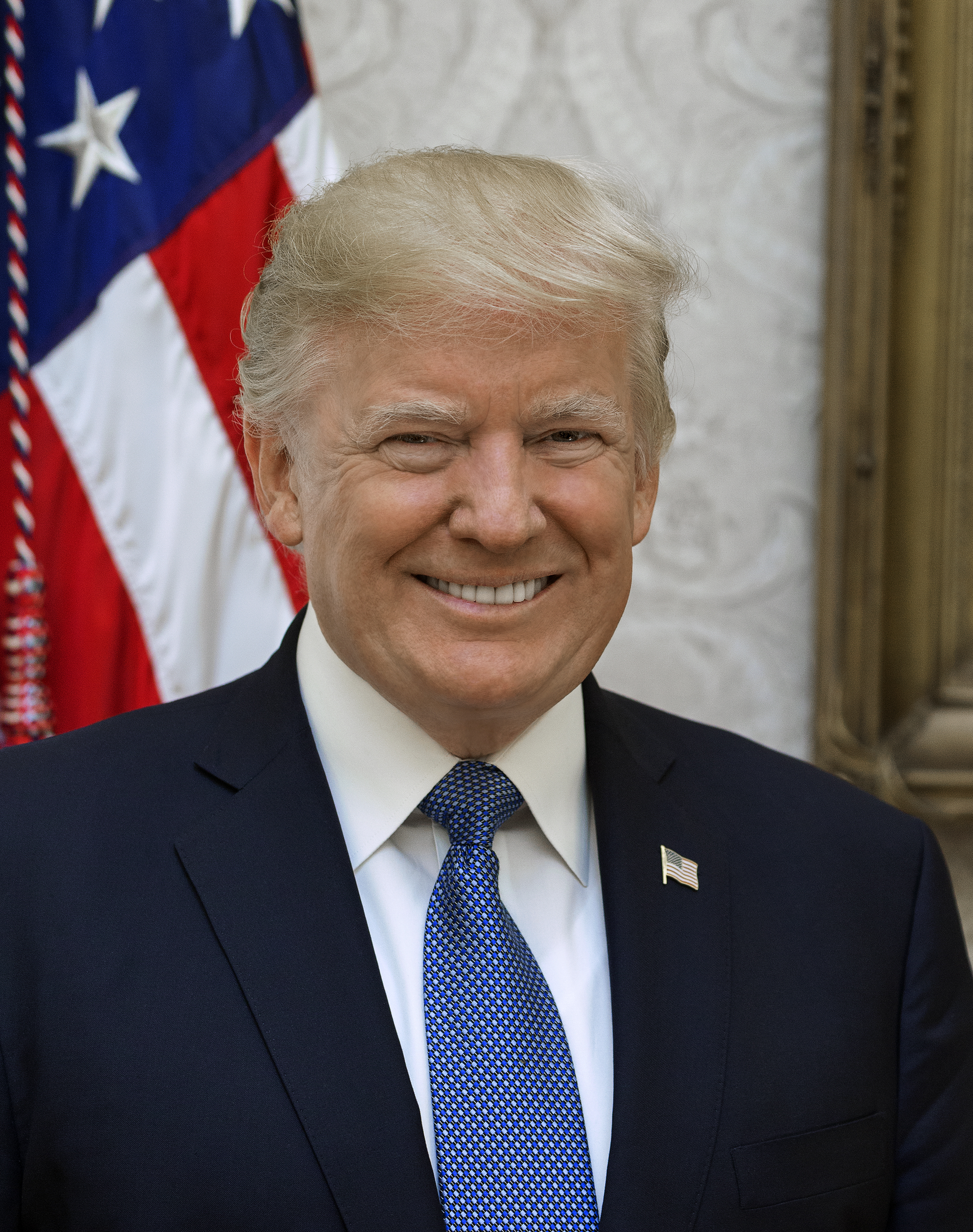
U.S. president Donald Trump

During the late-1990s Clinton–Lewinsky scandal, U.S. president Bill Clinton ordered missile strikes in Afghanistan and Sudan shortly after the story broke, drawing comparisons with the film and popularizing usage of the phrase. During impeachment proceedings of Clinton, Clinton also bombed Iraq, drawing stronger "wag the dog" allusions. With the scandal still on the public's mind in March 1999, his administration launched a bombing campaign against Yugoslavia. These actions drew more attention to the phrase, growing its popularity.

It was used multiple times during U.S. president Donald Trump's first term. First, in April 2017 when he conducted airstrikes against Syria during an investigation of Russian interference in the 2016 United States elections, and again in January 2020, after a U.S. airstrike assassination of Iran's General Qasem Soleimani occurred during the first impeachment trials of Trump. During Trump's second term, it was used to describe his military strikes of boats in the Caribbean Sea and his war with Iran as possible distractions from the Epstein files, high inflation, and low approval numbers.

== See also ==
- Cart before the horse
- Dead-cat strategy
- Diversionary foreign policy
- Rally 'round the flag effect
