= War economy =

Actions taken by a state to mobilize its economy for war production

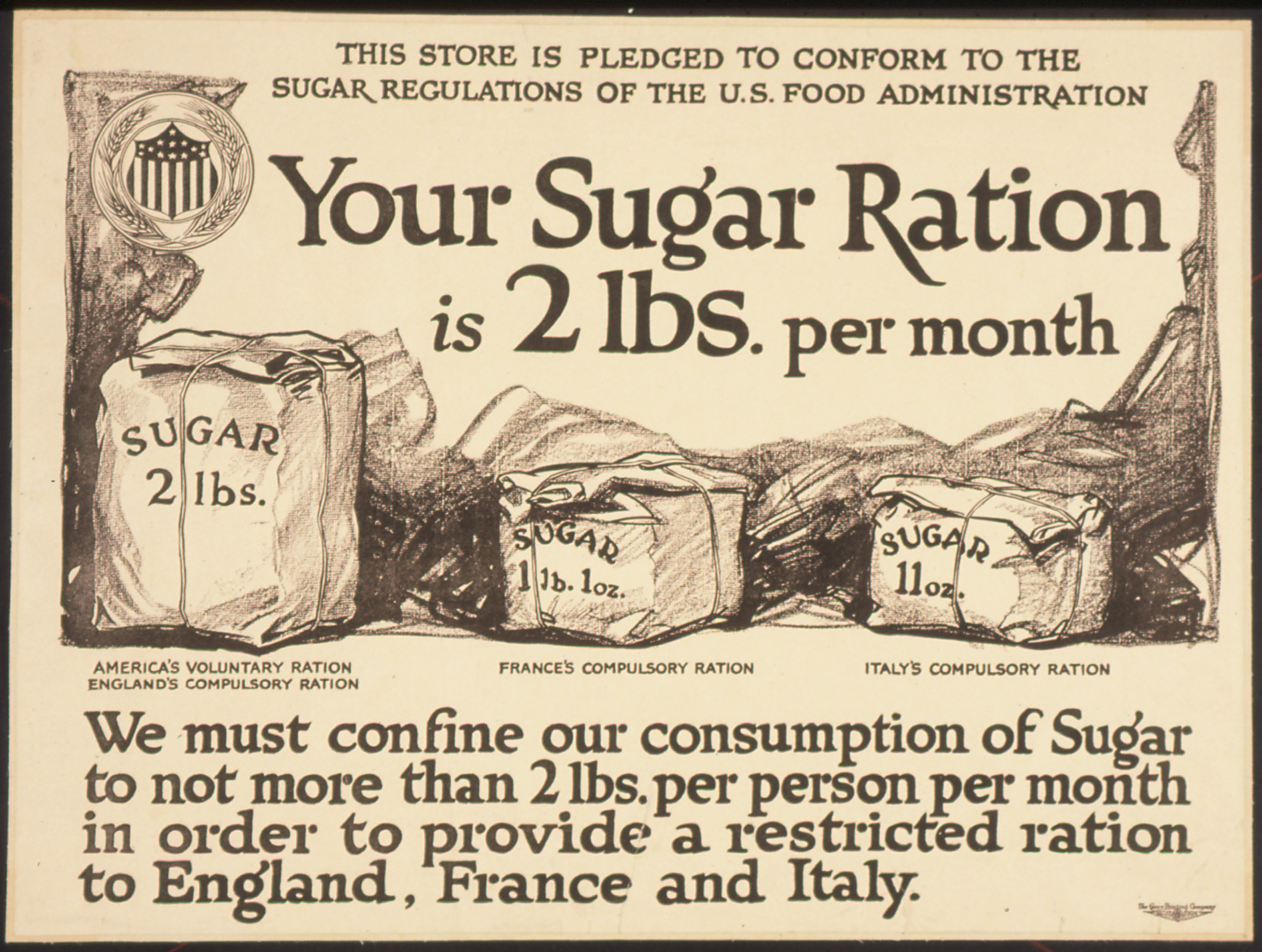
An American poster from World War I explaining sugar rations. Sugar was being conserved to provide for allied countries in Europe and support the war effort.

A war economy or wartime economy is the set of preparations undertaken by a modern state to mobilize its economy for war production. Philippe Le Billon describes a war economy as a "system of producing, mobilizing and allocating resources to sustain the violence". Some measures taken include the increasing of interest rates as well as the introduction of resource allocation programs. Approaches to the reconfiguration of the economy differ from country to country.

Many states increase the degree of planning in their economies during wars. That in many cases extends to rationing and in some cases to conscription for civil defense. During total war situations, certain buildings and positions are often seen as important targets by combatants.

Concerning the side of aggregate demand, the concept of a war economy has been linked to the concept of "military Keynesianism", in which the government's military budget stabilizes business cycles and fluctuations and/or is used to fight recessions. On the supply side, it has been observed that wars sometimes have the effect of accelerating technological progress to such an extent that an economy is greatly strengthened after the war, especially if it has avoided the war-related destruction. Some economists such as Seymour Melman argue, however, that the wasteful nature of much of military spending eventually can hurt technological progress.

War is often used as a last-ditch effort to prevent deteriorating economic conditions or currency crises, particularly by expanding services and employment in the military and by simultaneously depopulating segments of the population to free up resources and restore the economic and social order. A temporary war economy can also be seen as a means to avoid the need for more permanent militarization.

== United States ==
The United States has a very complex history with wartime economies. Many notable instances came during the 20th century during which the country's main conflicts were World War I, World War II, the Korean War, and the Vietnam War.

=== World War I ===
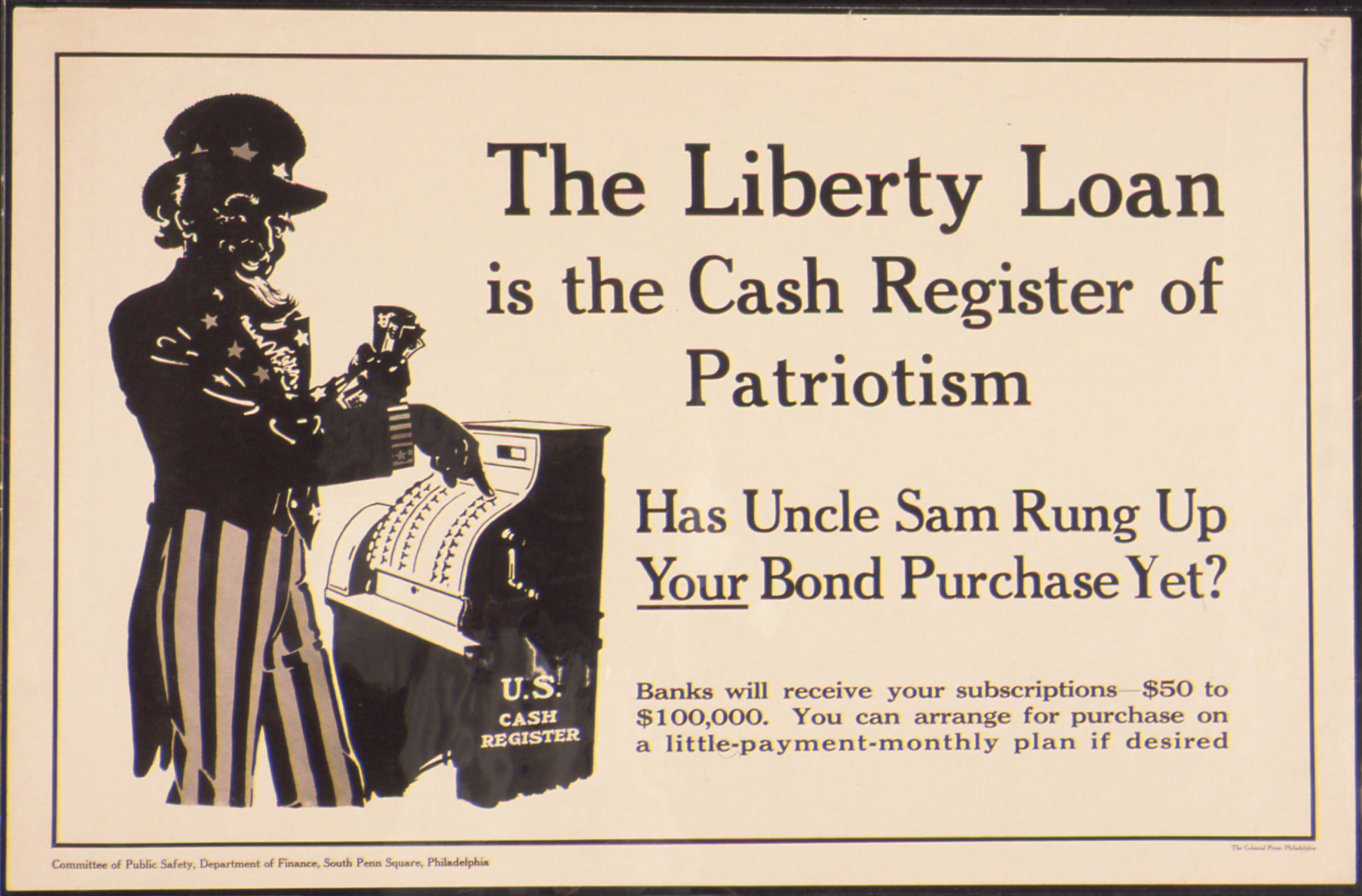
Poster issued during World War I by the educational division of the U.S. Food Administration

In mobilizing for World War I, the United States expanded its governmental powers by creating institutions such as the War Industries Board (WIB) to help with military production. Others, such as the Fuel Administration, introduced daylight saving time in an effort to save coal and oil while the Food Administration encouraged higher grain production and "mobilized a spirit of self-sacrifice rather than mandatory rationing".

Propaganda also played a large part in garnering support for topics ranging from tax initiatives to food conservation. Speaking on Four Minute Men, volunteers who rallied the public through short speeches, investigative journalist George Creel stated that the idea was extremely popular and the program saw thousands of volunteers throughout the states.

=== World War II ===
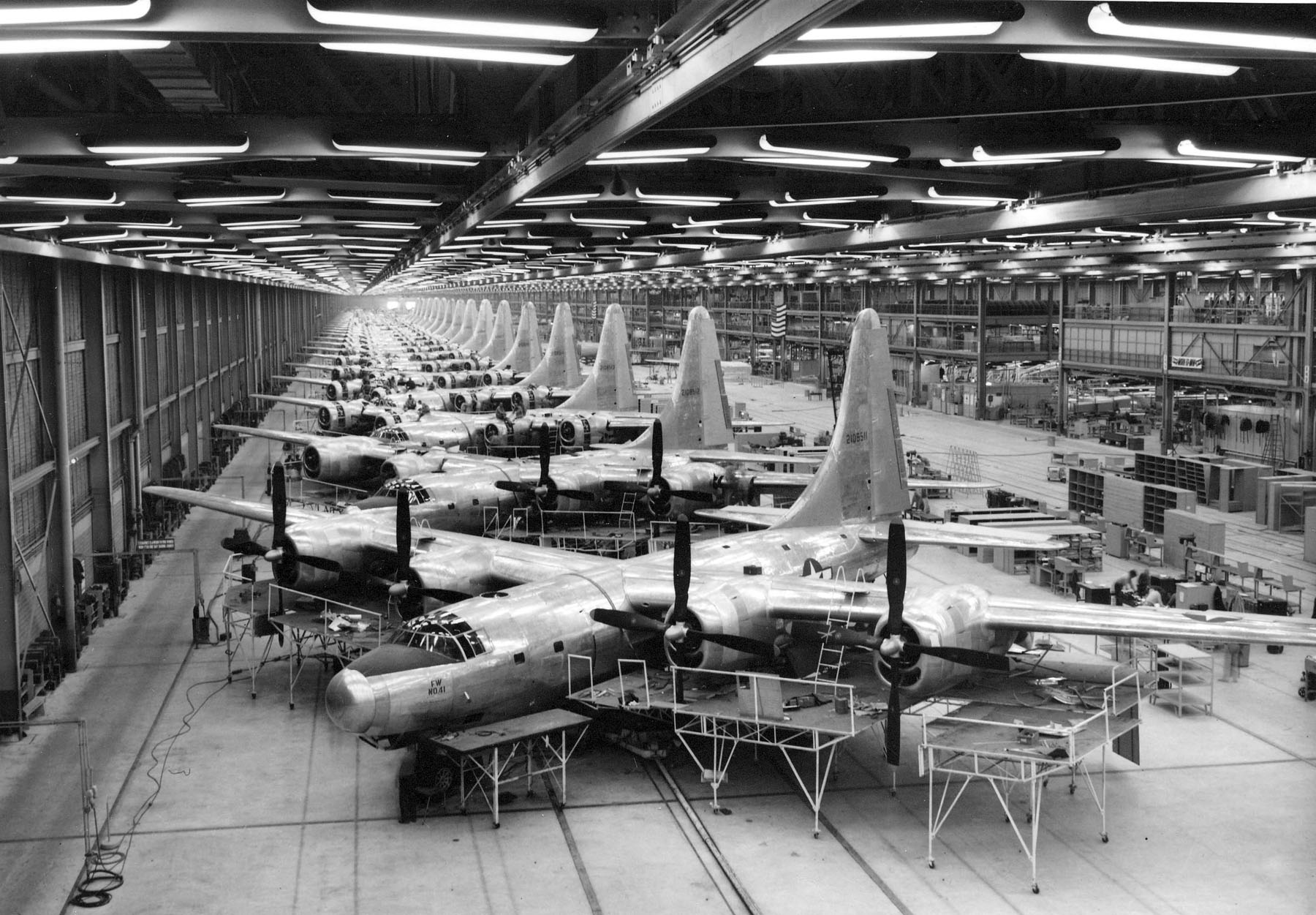
Mass production of Consolidated B-32 Dominator airplanes at Consolidated Aircraft Plant No. 4, near Fort Worth, Texas, during World War II

In the case of World War II, the U.S. government took similar measures in increasing its control over the economy. The Fall of France and the Dunkirk evacuation across the English Channel before the Battle of Britain provided the sparks that were needed to begin the country's conversion to a wartime economy and the July 1940 passing of the Two-Ocean Navy Act. The 1941 Attack on Pearl Harbor prolonged and expanded those measures.

Washington felt that a greater bureaucracy was needed to help with mobilization. The government raised taxes which paid for half of the costs of the war and borrowed money in the form of war bonds to cover the rest of the bill. "Commercial institutions like banks also bought billions of dollars of bonds and other treasury paper, holding more than $24 billion at the war's end." The creation of a handful of agencies helped funnel resources towards the war effort. One prominent agency was the War Production Board (WPB), which "awarded defense contracts, allocated scarce resources – such as rubber, copper, and oil – for military uses, and persuaded businesses to convert to military production".

The United States mass-produced many vehicles, such as ships (i.e. Liberty ships), aircraft (i.e. North American P-51 Mustang), jeeps (i.e. Willys MB), and tanks (i.e. M4 Sherman).

Two thirds of the American economy had been integrated into the war effort by the end of 1943. Because of the massive cooperation between government and private entities, it could be argued that the economic measures enacted prior to and during the Second World War helped lead the Allies to victory.

=== Today ===
The United States has been involved in numerous military endeavours within the Middle East and Latin America since the 1960s and has been in a continuous state of war since the September 11 attacks. As of 2025, the country has an annual military budget that is larger than those of India, China, Russia, the United Kingdom, Germany, Saudi Arabia, and France combined. (Note: Expenditures vary depending the source used, see also List of countries with highest military expenditures for more details.)

== Germany ==
=== World War I ===
Germany experienced economic devastation during both World Wars. That was not a result of faulty economic planning, but it is important to understand the ways that Germany approached reconstruction. During World War I, the German agricultural sector was hit hard by the demands of the war effort. Many of the workers conscripted, and much of the food itself was allocated for the troops, which led to a shortage. "German authorities were not able to solve the food scarcity [problem], but implemented a food rationing system and several price ceilings to prevent speculation and profiteering. Unfortunately, these measures did not have the desired success."

=== World War II ===
Heading into World War II, Germany introduced new policies that not only caused the unemployment rate to drop but also created a competent war machine in clear violation of the Treaty of Versailles. The Third Reich implemented a draft and built factories to supply its quickly expanding military. Both actions created jobs for many Germans who had been struggling from the economic collapse after World War I. However, while unemployment rates plummeted, "by 1939, government debt stood at over 40 billion Reichsmarks (equivalent to 178 billion euros in 2021 value)." During the war, Germany heavily exploited the economies of the countries that it conquered.

The most important one, according to the historians Boldorf and Scherner, was France and "her highly developed economy... [being] one of the biggest in Europe." That is further supported when the authors later reveal how the French economy provided for 11 percent of Germany's national income during the occupation, which covered five months of Germany's total income during the war. Using extortion and forced labor, the Nazis siphoned off much of France's economic output.

For example, during the early months of the German occupation, Vichy France was forced to pay a "quartering" fee of twenty million Reichsmarks per day. Supposedly, the fee was payment for the Nazi occupation forces. In reality, the money was used to fuel the war economy. Germany employed numerous methods to support its war effort. However, the German surrender to the Allies makes it difficult to tell what the Nazis' economic policies would have yielded in the long term.

== Other examples ==
In August 1921, Mustafa Kemal issued the Tekâlif-i Milliye orders, turning the Turkish economy into a war economy, and allowing the government to confiscate abandoned goods and foodstuffs suitable for military use. The order mostly covered property belonging to Greeks and Armenians who had been forcibly deported from their homes.

Armenia is another example that followed war economy principles, especially during the 2020 Second Nagorno-Karabakh War. The small country was blockaded but still increased its military budget after 2018, when it reached $640 million. In 2019, its military cost 18.8% of the country's total budget. Besides mobilizing financial resources, Armenia also declared mobilization and concentrated human capital (volunteers, doctors, and soldiers).

== See also ==
- Companies by arms sales
- Defense Economics
- Diversionary war
- Economic nationalism
- Economic warfare
- Industrial warfare
- Military–industrial complex
- Permanent war economy
- Resistance economy
- Total war
- War communism
- War effort
