= Bull trap =

Stock market trading term

In stock market trading, a bull trap is an inaccurate signal that shows a decreasing trend in a stock or index has reversed and is now heading upwards, when in fact, the security will continue to decline.

It is seen as a trap because investors with a "bullish" market sentiment purchase the stock, thinking it will increase in value, but is trapped with a poor performing stock whose value is still falling.

== See also ==
- Boom and bust
- Dead cat bounce
- Economic bubble
- Market trend
- Speculation
- Stock market bubble
