= Dead cat strategy =

Introduction of a distracting topic

The dead cat strategy, also known as deadcatting, is the political strategy of deliberately making a shocking announcement to divert media attention away from problems or failures in other areas. The term is popularly associated with political strategist Lynton Crosby's work on the successful London mayoral campaigns of Boris Johnson.

== Origin ==
In 2013, while he was mayor of London, Boris Johnson wrote a column for The Telegraph in which he described a political manoeuvre known as "throwing a dead cat on the table":

To understand what has happened in Europe in the last week, we must borrow from the rich and fruity vocabulary of Australian political analysis. Let us suppose you are losing an argument. The facts are overwhelmingly against you, and the more people focus on the reality the worse it is for you and your case. Your best bet in these circumstances is to perform a manoeuvre that a great campaigner describes as "throwing a dead cat on the table, mate".

That is because there is one thing that is absolutely certain about throwing a dead cat on the dining room table – and I don't mean that people will be outraged, alarmed, disgusted. That is true, but irrelevant. The key point, says my Australian friend, is that everyone will shout "Jeez, mate, there's a dead cat on the table!"; in other words they will be talking about the dead cat, the thing you want them to talk about, and they will not be talking about the issue that has been causing you so much grief.

Johnson employed the Australian Lynton Crosby as his campaign manager during the 2008 and 2012 London mayoral elections, leading to press speculation that he was the "Australian friend" in the story. The phrase went on to become popularly associated with political strategist Crosby and his management of Johnson's successful mayoral campaigns.

== Usage ==
Political lecturer Grant Rodwell describes the strategy as having found "some political traction" during the 2015 United Kingdom general election, the Conservative campaign for which Lynton Crosby led, and in which Johnson successfully stood to return as an MP. At a point when Labour's campaign had been gaining momentum, Defence Secretary Michael Fallon accused Ed Miliband of having "stabbed his own brother in the back to become Labour leader" and said that this meant he was "willing to stab the United Kingdom in the back to become prime minister" by scrapping Trident. The Guardian described this as a "crude" and "brutal" attack that some commentators thought would backfire, but it successfully moved that day's media focus from Labour's policies to Fallon's statement.

Rodwell notes the term later finding a place in media coverage of the "outrageous pronouncements" made by Donald Trump during the 2016 Republican Party presidential primaries and his later presidential transition in the United States.

In October 2026, the phrase entered political discourse during the 2026 Taiwanese local elections. Puma Shen, the Democratic Progressive Party candidate for Mayor of Taipei, accused incumbent mayor Chiang Wan-an of employing a "dead cat strategy" to evade scrutiny over several municipal controversies, including cases of child abuse, school meal standards, and tree-felling at Shilin Meilun Park. Shen argued that rather than addressing these issues directly, Chiang sought to deflect public attention by introducing unrelated, contentious topics.

== See also ==
- Chewbacca defense – Nonsensical diversionary legal defense
- Dead cat bounce – Small, brief recovery in the price of a declining stock
- Diversionary foreign policy – Conflict instigated to distract from domestic strife
- Fearmongering – Deliberate use of fear-based tactics
- Political strategy – Industry for advising and assisting political campaigns
- Post-truth politics – Politics in which facts are considered irrelevant
- Propaganda techniques – Methods of mind manipulation, often based on logical fallacies
- Rally 'round the flag effect – Increased short-run support for a leader in crisis or war
- Red herring – Fallacious approach to mislead an audience
- Wag the dog – Diversional political strategy, often military in nature
- Whataboutism – Informal fallacy and propaganda strategy
- Ming vase strategy – Political strategy emphasising cautiousness
