= List of Aldnoah.Zero episodes =

Cover of the first volume of the Blu-ray release by Aniplex.

Aldnoah.Zero is a mecha anime television series created by Gen Urobuchi and Olympus Knights, and animated by A-1 Pictures and Troyca. The series presents the story of the Vers Empire's 37 clans of Orbital Knights' attempted reconquest of Earth—enabled by the empowering titular Aldnoah energy/drive technology—following their return to Earth as a more technologically advanced people after a human diaspora to the planet Mars. Created by Gen Urobuchi with direction by Ei Aoki, the series features principle Japanese voice acting by Natsuki Hanae, Kensho Ono, and Sora Amamiya, with animated relational and battle scenes set on or in the fictional Earth of 2014, the orbital castles of Vers Empire's Orbital Knights, Vers bases on a shattered remnant of Earth's moon, and occasionally, the Vers palace of its failing emperor on Mars. The series began in July 2014, and as of March 2016, had presented two full 12-episode seasons, with Urobuchi, Katsuhiko Takayama, and Shinsuke Onishi, and then Hiroyuki Sawano and Kalafina, respectively, receiving principle script-writing and music credits.

== Setting ==
In an alternate 1972, Astronauts from the Apollo 17 mission find ancient technology known as "Hypergate" (ハイパーゲート, Haipāgēto) on the Moon that allows for near-instantaneous travel to and from Mars, allowing for the colonisation of Mars. More ancient technology found on Mars to be known as "Aldnoah" (アルドノア, Arudonoa) is claimed by the immigrants who would go on to declare independence and found the Vers Empire. This leads to a tense state of affairs with Earth, eventually culminating in open war in 1999. During a battle between the United Earth and the Vers Empire on the Moon, the Hypergate goes out of control and explodes, destroying the Moon in an event that would come to be known as "Heaven's Fall" (ヘブンズ・フォール, Hebunzu Fōru). The destruction of the Hypergate causes Vers Empire Forces to be stranded in Earth orbit, leading to a ceasefire between Earth and Mars.

== Series overview ==
Season	Episodes	Originally released	
Season	Episodes	First released	Last released
1	12	July 6, 2014	September 21, 2014
2	12	January 11, 2015	March 29, 2015

== Episode list ==
=== Season 1 (2014) ===
No.	Title	Original air date
1	"Princess of VERS"; Transliteration: "Kasei no Purinsesu" (Japanese: 火星のプリンセス -Princess of VERS-)	July 6, 2014
In July 2014, 15 years after Heaven's Fall, the First Princess of the Vers Empire, Asseylum Vers Allusia travels to Earth on a diplomatic mission despite discouragement from her close companion, Slaine Troyard. Back on Earth, Inaho Kaizuka lives in the city of Shinawara, Japan (a fictitious version of the real-world city of Awara) with his elder sister Yuki. Yuki is a Warrant Officer and a Kataphrakt pilot in service to the United Forces of Earth (UFE), while Inaho attends Shinawara High School and the UFE’s mandatory Kataphrakt pilot training programme. When Inaho and his friends go to see Asseylum's motorcade, terrorists attack the motorcade of the Martian delegation with a guided missile. Although it initially appears that the limousine carrying Asseylum successfully avoids the attack, the terrorists successfully hit the limousine with a second volley, and it is believed that the princess is killed. In retaliation, the Vers Orbital Knights launch an all-out assault on Earth via the descent of their Landing Castles from Earth orbit and launching missiles, which destroys undersea cables, geostationary communication satellites and major cities. A pair of young children mistake the streaks of light in the sky caused by the descent of Landing Castles for shooting stars and wish for world peace.
2	"Beyond the Horizon"; Transliteration: "Chikyū no Ichiban Nagai Hi" (Japanese: 地球の一番長い日 -Beyond the Horizon-)	July 13, 2014
The Vers invasion begins with Landing Castles crashing into New Orleans, Maputo, Beijing, Tokyo and other major cities. Martian Kataphrakts emerge and destroy the Terran defenders, whose conventional weapons are ineffective against the Vers Kataphrakts, which are armed with Aldnoah technology. In Shinawara, while preparing to evacuate, Inaho finds two girls and informs them of the need to evacuate. One of the girls subdue him and asks him what the evacuation is for, prompting Inaho to inform them of the assassination of Princess Asseylum. The girl then reveals to Inaho that Asseylum became ill after making planetfall due to the change in gravity and it was actually a body double that died. Meanwhile, Slaine transports Baron Trillram and his Kataphrakt (named "Nilokeras") to Shinawara in a Sky Carrier while destroying several Terran F-22s. Later, the terrorists who committed the assassination meet up with Baron Trillram, and are revealed to be Vers loyalists. They are killed by Baron Trillram to ensure the truth about the false flag operation is never revealed. Rayet, the daughter of one of the agents, manages to survive the attack and flees, but is pursued by Trillram. 2nd Lieutenant Marito's squad engages Trillram, but are defeated with multiple squad members killed in action. Inaho and his friends arrive in an APC that is evacuating civilians and manage to rescue both Rayet and Yuki. However, Trillram pursues them in order to silence Rayet, and Okisuke is thrown off the vehicle and killed after being absorbed by Nilokeras's shield. After entering a tunnel and evading Trillram, Inaho receives orders from Marito to draw Trillram's Kataphrakt away to buy more time for an evacuation.
3	"The Children's Echelon"; Transliteration: "Senjō no Shōnen-tachi" (Japanese: 戦場の少年たち -The Children's Echelon-)	July 20, 2014
Inaho and his friends find themselves holed up in their high school with orders to distract Trillram while Marito comes up with a plan to evacuate his students and the civilians. Unsatisfied with being just be a distraction, Inaho comes up with a plan to fight back against Trillram and his seemingly impervious machine. The unknown girl and Rayet, both feeling some personal responsibility for the situation, volunteer to drive the decoy truck, and the team begins their operation. Meanwhile, Marito, backed by Captain Magbaredge, rallies his crew and rescues the civilians from Inaho's group while Inaho, Calm, and Inko engage Trillram; Inaho exploits Nilokeras' inability to see without the use of UAVs to bait Trillram towards a bridge over open water. When Trillram finally catches the decoy truck, the unknown girl reveals her true identity as Princess Asseylum, distracting him just long enough for Inaho to push Nilokeras off the bridge and strike its weak spot, finishing it off. While Inaho and his comrades regroup and celebrate, Slaine and Trillram prepare to escape. Trillram reveals that the assassination of the Princess was a Martian plot all along, and that he must rearm and eliminate her as quickly as possible. In response, a shocked and enraged Slaine pulls out Trillram's pistol and shoots him multiple times, killing him.
4	"Point of No Return"; Transliteration: "Tsuigeki no Kishi" (Japanese: 追撃の騎士 -Point of No Return-)	July 27, 2014
The Martians bombard Shinawara as Slaine leaves the area. Inaho and his friends meet up with UFE forces led by Captain Magbaredge as they prepare to evacuate the area by sea via Magbaredge's carrier, the UFES Wadatsumi. Asseylum decides to reveal her true identity in private to Inaho and requests him to help her contact her grandfather, the current Emperor of Vers, in hopes of stopping the emerging war. Soon, the military finds themselves attacked by another Martian Knight named Vlad, who pilots a Kataphrakt equipped with a plasma sword. UFE Kataphrakts hold Vlad back while Inaho, Calm and Inko smash a large shipping container into the enemy Kataphrakt's head. Vlad decides to retreat as the Wadatsumi arrives with reinforcements. With Vlad gone, Magbaredge takes the opportunity to evacuate everybody aboard the carrier.
5	"Phantom of The Emperor"; Transliteration: "Ekken no Saki de" (Japanese: 謁見の先で -Phantom of The Emperor-)	August 3, 2014
The Emperor of Mars calls for a ceasefire while he considers the truth behind the events on Earth. Inaho and his comrades take the moment to rest aboard the Wadatsumi while Asseylum ponders if she should reveal her identity to everyone. Rayet disagrees, telling Asseylum that doing so will only paint a large target on their backs for the Martian Knights. Vlad returns in his repaired Kataphrakt, now equipped with another plasma sword, looking for a rematch against "the orange Kataphrakt", which refers to the trainer Kataphrakt unit that Inaho had piloted earlier in combat against Vlad. As he cuts through the carrier's defenses, Inaho rises to the challenge by baiting him into an attack and then rigs his own Kataphract to drag Vlad into the ocean, where the intense heat from the Kataphrakt engines and plasma from the swords sparks a steam explosion, killing Vlad. Meanwhile, Slaine tries to inform the Emperor that Asseylum is still alive and that some of the Orbital Knights were conspiring to go to war. Just as he leaves the room, Count Saazbaum appears, claiming that Slaine was feeding him false information. The Emperor immediately calls for war.
6	"Steel Step Suite"; Transliteration: "Kioku no Shima" (Japanese: 記憶の島 -Steel Step Suite-)	August 10, 2014
Slaine is declared persona non grata by Lord Cruhteo as the Emperor officially declares war against Earth. Every able-bodied man and woman on the Wadatsumi is immediately conscripted into service to the UFE, with Calm annoyed that he was chosen to be a mechanic. As the ship heads towards Tanegashima Island for resupply, Lieutenant Marito discusses the Tanegashima Report, which recounts a battle between Terran forces and a Martian Kataphrakt on Tanegashima shortly before the occurrence of Heaven's Fall, with a chunk of the Moon hitting the island. Apparently, UFE brass decided to suppress the report rather than admit the superior technological advantage of Mars in comparison to Earth. Magbaredge reveals her real surname as Humeray and blames Marito for her brother's death during the first Earth-Mars War. Later, another Knight, Femieanne, piloting the Kataphract 'Hellas', attacks the carrier, armed with flying arms that are near-indestructible. Inaho and his comrades attempt to defend the Wadatsumi while Marito suffers from another bout of PTSD. Inaho is able to use high-powered rifle rounds to knock the arms off-course to prevent damage to the ship. Just as he is unable to shoot down the last one, Slaine appears in a Sky Carrier to finish it off.
7	"The Boys of Earth"; Transliteration: "Kaigō no Futari" (Japanese: 邂逅の二人 -The Boys of Earth-)	August 17, 2014
With Slaine arriving on the scene, Inaho surmises that he is here to assist them, at least for the time being. With Slaine and Inaho cooperating, Hellas' flying arms are kept off-course and away from the Wadatsumi. During the attack, one of the flying arms hits a cliff side on Tanegashima, revealing a hidden dock within. Knowing that the ship won't last long in the open, Magbaredge orders the Wadatsumi to take shelter in the dock, and destroys the entrance behind them. The crew then decides to explore the hidden dock, and find a secret underground facility holding the remains of the Martian Kataphrakt Marito fought 15 years ago on Tanegashima (named "Deucalion"), as well as something else. Inaho, Yuki, and Inko decide to remain outside to continue fighting Femieanne. Deciding to take the fight directly to her, Inaho boards Slaine's craft. He figures out that the flying arms' armor is weak at the engines and the palms, and exploits this weakness to destroy all of them. Angered, Femieanne attempts to ram Inaho and Slaine, but is interrupted when a battleship, activated by Asseylum and piloted by the Wadatsumi crew, emerges from Tanegashima. Inaho and Slaine shoot down Femieanne and Rayet finishes her off, destroying the Hellas and killing her. Inaho, after a short exchange with Slaine regarding their intentions, shoots him down in the belief that Slaine might be planning to exploit the princess.
8	"Then and Now"; Transliteration: "Tori o Mita Hi" (Japanese: 鳥を見た日 -Then and Now-)	August 24, 2014
Flashing back to the events of the previous episode, the Wadatsumi crew finds a flying battleship, named the Deucalion, hidden under Tanegashima, constructed with the Aldnoah Drive extracted from the Kataphrakt of the same name. Asseylum reveals her identity to the crew and uses her royal blood to activate the Deucalion's Aldnoah Drive, as Aldnoah Drives can only be activated by individuals related to the Emperor of Mars. With Asseylum's identity publicly known, Magbaredge agrees to protect Asseylum and escort her to the UFE HQ in Novosibirsk. Asseylum then goes out onto the deck with Inaho, where she marvels when she sees birds for the first time, and is teased by Inaho, causing Asseylum to blush and pout. Meanwhile, Slaine is captured by Cruhteo and taken to his Landing Castle, where Cruhteo tortures him to try and find out why Slaine betrayed him as Saazbaum watches. Unsure if Cruhteo was involved in the plot to assassinate Asseylum, Slaine stays quiet, and throughout his torture he relives several flashbacks of his childhood with Asseylum back on Mars. Slaine eventually reveals to Cruhteo that Asseylum is still alive and that the assassination plot was carried out by conspiring Martians. Shocked, Cruhteo orders an immediate ceasefire so that the conspirators can be found. However, Saazbaum attacks Cruhteo's castle, killing Cruhteo and capturing Slaine.
9	"Darkness Visible"; Transliteration: "Tsuioku Sōchi" (Japanese: 追憶装置 -Darkness Visible-)	August 31, 2014
While training in the combat simulator, Rayet suffers a bout of PTSD as she sees a virtual representation of Nilokeras, the Kataphrakt that killed her father. Shortly afterward, Doctor Yagarai borrows the simulator program to help Marito deal with his own trauma from Tanegashima 15 years earlier. Though the program is a crude visualization of the 1999 battle at Tanegashima, Marito has a flashback to when an unknown Kataphrakt singlehandedly destroyed his entire tank battalion. During the battle at Tanegashima 15 years prior, Marito was forced to mercy kill his tank driver and friend John Humeray, as Humeray was unable to escape a flaming tank wreckage, which causes Marito to blame himself for Humeray's death. Meanwhile on Saazbaum's Landing Castle, Slaine finds himself a guest of Saazbaum, who admits he conspired to have the princess killed so as to rekindle the war with Earth in order to change the Vers Empire itself, but spared Slaine for a debt he owed to Slaine's father. Back on the Deucalion, Rayet struggles to empathize with Asseylum after being reminded of the time they took down Nilokeras. When Rayet finds Asseylum alone in the shower, she sneaks up from behind and strangles Asseylum with her own necklace, causing Asseylum to become unconscious. By the time Rayet has regained her focus, the Aldnoah drive on the Deucalion has shut down, crashing the entire ship.
10	"Before the War"; Transliteration: "Arashi ni Naru Made" (Japanese: 嵐になるまで -Before the War-)	September 7, 2014
Inaho successfully revives Asseylum in the shower room using CPR and a defibrillator, but Rayet grabs Magbaredge's pistol and holds everyone in the shower hostage. Rayet blames Asseylum for being able to integrate into the UFE while she and her father were outcasts, before turning the gun on herself. However, Inaho disarms her, offering her another chance to fight the Martians. Magbaredge throws Rayet in the brig, then goes off to privately watch Marito's confession in Yagarai's lab. Meanwhile, Saazbaum reveals to Slaine that the Vers Empire convinced their people to attack Earth in the First Earth-Mars War to distract them from their own chronic problems with producing sufficient amounts of food and water on an environmentally hostile Mars. Saazbaum and his wife, Viscountess Orleans, joined the attack on Earth at Tanegashima, but Orleans and her unborn child were killed after her Kataphrakt "Deucalion" was crushed by falling pieces of Moon debris from Heaven's Fall. Back on Earth, the Deucalion finally arrives at UFE headquarters in Novosibirsk, Russia, and Asseylum tries to broadcast her message calling for a ceasefire. However, Saazbaum tells Slaine that the satellite base on the broken Moon is staffed by his allies, such Asseylum's message will never reach Mars. Saazbaum then offers Slaine two choices: stay and fight with him (in Cruhteo's recovered Kataphrakt "Tharsis"), or escape to Earth and be treated as an enemy.
11	"Wind, Snow and Stars"; Transliteration: "Novosutarisuku no Kōbō" (Japanese: ノヴォスタリスクの攻防 -Wind, Snow and Stars-)	September 14, 2014
Saazbaum directs his Landing Castle to land near to UFE headquarters, and then uses bunker buster missiles to clear a path for his forces to attack the base and kill Asseylum. UFE forces attempt to defend their position, but the Martian Kataphrakts easily tear through their defensive lines. Asseylum proposes that the Deucalion transport her to the Landing Castle, where she can personally shut off its Aldnoah Drive and cut off Saazbaum's forces from their power source. Asseylum manages to reach the Deucalion with some help from Rayet and Edelrittuo, and the ship shoots its way out of the base. Inaho then formulates a plan to deliver Asseylum via a HALO jump from the stratosphere. Using unmanned dummy robots as cover from the castle's anti-air defenses, Inaho and his comrades manage to clear a path for Asseylum, but before Asseylum's Kataphrakt can jump, Saazbaum's Kataphrakt Dioscuria appears in the stratosphere and shoots it down with the Deucalion. With the original plan ruined, Magbaredge decides to deliver Asseylum by ramming the damaged Deucalion itself into the Landing Castle.
12	"Childhood's End"; Transliteration: "Tatoe Ten ga Ochiru Tomo" (Japanese: たとえ天が堕ちるとも -Childhood's End-)	September 21, 2014
With the Deucalion crashed, Yuki and Inko attempt to escort Asseylum to the Landing Castle's Aldnoah Drive themselves. Meanwhile, Inaho takes it upon himself to hold off Saazbaum, who reveals that his Dioscuria now possesses all of the abilities of the Kataphrakts Inaho had previously fought. Meanwhile, Slaine follows the Deucalion back to the Landing Castle, and boards the Tharsis, hoping to at least be able to fight with auxiliary power. However, he finds out to his surprise that he has the ability to activate Aldnoah Drives as well. As Inaho and Saazbaum fight, Saazbaum initially has the upper hand due to the technological superiority of his Dioscuria in comparison with Inaho's Sleipnir, but Inaho uses everything he has learned from previous battles with Vers Kataphrakts to exploit Dioscuria's weaknesses, severely damaging it. However, before he can finish off Saazbaum, Slaine tackles Inaho's Kataphrakt with Tharsis. Right when Asseylum manages to reach the core and shut it down, Inaho and Slaine's Kataphrakts crash through the wall of the chamber holding the Aldnoah Drive. As Asseylum goes to assist Inaho, she is shot and apparently killed by Saazbaum, who thanks Slaine for saving his life. Slaine, in a fit of rage, fires at Saazbaum with his pistol until his magazine is emptied, which mortally wounds Saazbaum. Inaho, injured from the crash, crawls his way to Asseylum's body. As Inaho remembers various memories of his time spent with Asseylum, he realises that he genuinely loves her. However, Slaine stops him and holds him at gunpoint. The two recognise each other's voices from the battle with Femieanne, with Slaine referring to Inaho as "Orange" (due to Inaho's orange-coloured KG-6 Sleipnir) and Inaho referring to Slaine as "Bat" (due to Slaine's bat-like Sky Carrier). Inaho attempts to draw his own gun but is shot by Slaine in the head. Afterwards, it is said that after the shutdown of Saazbaum's Landing Castle, the attack on the UFE headquarters ended in a complete UFE victory, although at a high cost. Asseylum's whereabouts are also stated to be currently unknown. In the final scene, an unknown Kataphrakt is seen to be flying away from the wreckage of the battle.

=== Season 2 (2015) ===
No.	Title	Original airdate
SP	"ALDNOAH.ZERO EXTRA ARCHIVES"	January 4, 2015
Special recap of the first season ahead of the second season
13	"This Side of Paradise"; Transliteration: "Nemureru Tsuki no Shōjo" (Japanese: 眠れる月の少女 ―This Side of Paradise―)	January 11, 2015
In July 2016, 19 months after the events at UFE HQ in Novosibirsk, a UFE raiding party is shot down by the Tharsis, piloted by Slaine himself. Slaine has become a Vers Knight under Saazbaum, and the Vers Empire has been slowly conquering North and South America under the new support of Princess Asseylum as they plan to expand their reach. On Earth, the crew of the Deucalion prepare to finish their R&R when they come under attack from a Vers Kataphrakt named "Frozen Elysium" which saps all molecular energy in a 1 kilometre radius, causing UFE Kataphrakts to be unable to approach without their pilots freezing to death and their machines losing all power. Additionally, bullets and projectiles fired cannot hit Frozen Elysium, as they enter a superconductive state and veer away from Frozen Elysium due to the Meissner effect. Inaho appears in his restored KG-6 Sleipnir, and he uses airburst grenades to create a small path through the Field and destroys Frozen Elysium. Inaho later reconnects with Inko and Rayet, who greet him with happiness. The episode flashes back to the moments after Asseylum and Inaho were shot in the wreckage of Saazbaum's Landing Castle. Slaine decided to spare Saazbaum and escape with him and Asseylum in the Tharsis, and a wounded Inaho is left behind, who Slaine shot through his left temple and eye. Things look grim with Asseylum absent and the Deucalion still unpowered. However, the blood from Princess Asseylum that had splattered on his face (as well as her saliva from when Inaho performed CPR on her) was ingested, giving Inaho the ability to activate Aldnoah Drives as well, which is used to reactivate the Deucalion. In the present, with its repairs complete, the Deucalion launches into outer space. Meanwhile in Earth orbit, the Princess Asseylum giving the war speeches to the Vers Empire turns out to be Second Princess, Lemrina Vers Envers (a illegitimate daughter of the Second Emperor, Grelizia, and younger half-sister of Asseylum) who impersonates Asseylum under Saazbaum's supervision. As the night ends, Slaine goes to visit the real Asseylum, who is comatose and kept alive in a medical tank.
14	"The Beautiful and Damned"; Transliteration: "Isei no Rinjin tachi" (Japanese: 異星の隣人たち ―The Beautiful and Damned―)	January 18, 2015
UFE forces gather in Earth's orbit at Trident Base, built into an asteroid, as they prepare for a large-scale operation against a Vers-occupied asteroid base called Marineros. Meanwhile, Saazbaum rallies his own forces for a quick strike on Trident as they travel to Marineros. Slaine finds out that Lemrina has forcibly shut down the Tharsis' Aldnoah Drive, and tries to reason with her to get it running again. Eventually, Slaine is able to get her to restart the Tharsis, with Lemrina kissing Slaine before leaving. As Lemrina visits her still-unconscious sister and schemes to take her position, the Martian forces begin their assault while UFE troops dig in on nearby asteroids, and both sides soon begin to trade long-range shots. However, the complex gravitational fields in the asteroid-filled zone causes long-range fire from UFE and Vers guns alike to be inaccurate. Inaho makes use of his new cybernetic eye to accurately shoot down several enemies using a complex simulation of the gravitational fields in the area, but Slaine uses the precognitive abilities of Tharsis to observe the trajectories of the shells being fired at him, and is able to dodge at the last second. Both Inaho and Slaine express surprise, with Inaho quickly deducting that Slaine had dodged his shots by predicting the path of the shells, and Slaine confused that Inaho's shots had been pin-point accurate in the complicated gravitational flux. Soon after, Slaine identifies Inaho in his distinct orange-coloured "Sleipnir" Kataphrakt, and vice versa from UFE intel of Tharsis' pilot. The Martian forces leave the firing range of UFE troops, and both Inaho and Slaine are able to confirm that the other is alive.
15	"Toll for the Brave"; Transliteration: "Senten suru Wana" (Japanese: 旋転する罠 ―Toll for the Brave―)	January 25, 2015
Both UFE and Vers forces prepare for battle on their respective asteroid bases. Magbaredge confirms with Inaho that it wasn't Asseylum's blood alone that gave him the ability to activate Aldnoah Drives, but something that was transferred when he gave her CPR. Meanwhile, other Counts of the Vers Empire show open contempt at Slaine for being Earthborn, but before they can harm him, Saazbaum abruptly announces that he is adopting Slaine as his son and legal heir. After a tense period of waiting, Trident and Marineros are close enough that the two sides can begin their attacks. Inaho shoots down several enemy spacecraft and eventually runs into Slaine again, finally gaining confirmation that Slaine is somehow able to accurately predict the near future like himself. Saazbaum appears in his refurbished Dioscuria II to assist Slaine, and mentions that his shield's weak spot has changed as he chases Inaho through the debris field. Using smoke released from an explosion and help from Inaho, Inko is able to identify the new weak spot in Dioscuria II's shield, forcing Saazbaum to disable Dioscuria II's shield just as a micrometeoroid shower hits it, disabling the Kataphrakt. Slaine then tells Saazbaum that the shower was actually his own work, using Tharsis' precognitive systems to accurately pinpoint where Saazbaum would be two minutes in the future so he could destroy him as revenge for shooting Asseylum. After a second micrometeoroid shower finishes off Saazbaum, Slaine officially becomes a Count of the Vers Empire while Inaho is able to ascertain from Slaine's speech that Asseylum is still alive.
16	"Soldiers' Pay"; Transliteration: "Nessa no Shingeki" (Japanese: 熱砂の進撃 ―Soldiers' Pay―)	February 1, 2015
Down on Earth, Yuki and Marito are part of a UFE squadron garrisoned in Yemen, where they are informed that the Deucalion will be transferred to their area, giving them a chance to reunite with the crew. Meanwhile, on the Moon, Slaine reaffirms his loyalty to Lemrina as Princess Asseylum's guardian. He then discusses the ramifications of his inheritance of Saazbaum's position with his servant, Harklight. Slaine soon realizes that other Vers Knights will suspect that he had betrayed Saazbaum. Thus, Slaine decides he must do something to further legitimise his position. Meanwhile, the faction of Vers Knights who oppose Slaine's promotion order Count Mazuurek to begin an offensive at Yemen. Mazuurek has so far avoided combat as he seeks to preserve Earth's natural resources and local culture, but reluctantly deploys in his Kataphrakt (which generates artificial gravity waves to defend itself). Yuki and Marito are sent to intercept, but cannot penetrate Mazuurek's defenses. Marito then realizes that Mazuurek is vulnerable to attacks from above, and lures him to an area where the Deucalion can fire at him from orbit. Mazuurek's Kataphrakt is disabled and he is captured as a prisoner of war. The Deucalion finally lands, and Yuki and Marito are reunited with the crew. However, they find out that Slaine has singlehandedly destroyed Trident Base. Slaine wins the respect of the Vers Knights and silences his detractors, while Inaho realizes he has no choice but to defeat Slaine in order to proceed with his plans.
17	"The Turning Wheel"; Transliteration: "Bōryaku no Yoake" (Japanese: 謀略の夜明け ―The Turning Wheel―)	February 8, 2015
On Earth, Mazuurek is imprisoned by the UFE while Yuki and Marito reunite with their comrades from the Deucalion. Inaho reveals to Doctor Yagarai that he customized the software on his cybernetic left eye, and Yagarai comments that it may lead to brain problems down the road, warning against further modification of the eye. Later, Inaho interrogates Mazuurek, managing to find some common ground with him regarding Princess Asseylum, as both share the belief that Asseylum is being impersonated (as the impersonated Asseylum is uncharacteristically aggressive regarding the war). That night, Inaho and Rayet sneak Mazuurek out of the UFE base and into the desert, offering him a chance to get back home under the conditions that he find the real Asseylum and determine Slaine's real objective. Inko witnesses Inaho's actions, but chooses not to report it, hoping that Inaho knows what he is doing. Meanwhile, at the Vers' Moon base, Count Marylcian initiates a private conversation with Lemrina (disguised as Asseylum) and states that she is a caged bird. Marylcian then personally arrives at the station, unwilling to forgive Slaine for being a Terran, and formally challenges Slaine to a duel for the honor of being the faux Asseylum's Royal Guard.
18	"The Rose and the Ring"; Transliteration: "Fukai Mori o Nukete" (Japanese: 深い森を抜けて ―The Rose and the Ring―)	February 15, 2015
On Earth, the UFE launches an attack on a Martian Knight whose Kataphrakt can fire powerful lasers, preventing UFE troops from being able to get within firing range. While UFE troops distract the Kataphrakt, Inaho uses his cybernetic eye to direct artillery fire for the Deucalion's main cannons from atop a vantage point. The Deucalion arcs its shots over the curvature of the Earth, protecting it from reprisal from the Kataphrakt. Eventually, the Deucalion manages to score a direct hit on the Kataphrakt, killing its pilot. Later, Inko confronts Inaho about him freeing Mazuurek, and Inaho acknowledges his actions and states that he didn't want Inko to get involved out of concern for her. On the Moon base, Slaine and Marylcian begin their duel. Marylcian's Herschel uses numerous unmanned drones to attack Slaine, pushing the Tharsis' precognitive abilities to the limit. However, Slaine manages to gain an advantage over Marylcian by luring him into an old service tunnel, where Herschel's drones are unable to effectively manoeuver in the tight space of the tunnel, allowing Slaine to destroy all of the Herschel's drones. The now vulnerable Marylcian is then killed by Slaine, who seizes all of Marylcian's assets. Lemrina, still posing as Asseylum, makes an announcement to the rest of the Orbital Knights, declaring that they form their own kingdom independent from Vers, and that she and Slaine will be married. Afterwards, she visits the still comatose Asseylum and shuts down her life support, but decides to spare Asseylum's life by reactivating the medical tank. However, after Lemrina leaves, Asseylum begins to regain consciousness.
19	"Here to There"; Transliteration: "Rakuen no Kizu" (Japanese: 楽園の瑕 ―Here to There―)	February 22, 2015
Lemrina, disguised as Asseylum, continues her announcement to the Orbital Knights, ordering them to unite under Slaine's banner. With Lemrina, and by extension her power to activate Aldnoah under his control, Slaine effectively becomes the uncontested, de facto leader of the Vers Orbital Knights. Meanwhile, the real Asseylum regains consciousness, much to Slaine and Eddelrittuo's happiness. However, Slaine decides to keep news of Asseylum's recovery secret from Lemrina, instead telling her that Asseylum's condition has worsened and that Lemrina cannot visit her anymore. Lemrina then reiterates her pledge of loyalty to Slaine, who feels uncomfortable having to lie to her. In addition, as an amnesiac Asseylum recovers, she begins to recall memories about Inaho, much to Slaine's dismay. Gathering his resolve, Slaine decides to move forward with his plans. Slaine rewards Harklight with Herschel for his faithful service. Back on Earth, the Deucalion is tasked with assaulting another Landing Castle. However, when the crew begins to gain the upper hand, two more Martian Knights arrive as reinforcements. The Deucalion crew are then left in a situation they never had to consider before: being attacked by three Martian Knights simultaneously. Inaho realizes that this kind of organization could only have been possible under Slaine's direction, as the prideful Orbital Knights were unlikely to cooperate without outside interference.
20	"The Light of Day"; Transliteration: "Meiyo no Taika" (Japanese: 名誉の対価 ―The Light of Day―)	March 1, 2015
Now facing three Martian Knights at once, the UFE forces are quickly surrounded and trapped. However, thanks to timely intervention from the Deucalion, Inaho and his squad manage to escape, but not without the Deucalion suffering severe damage to its navigational systems. Inaho then uses his cybernetic eye to help navigate the ship, but later begins to feel pain as a side effect of overusing his eye. The Deucalion then receives new orders from HQ ordering them to renew the offensive, much to their displeasure. On the Moon, Mazuurek holds a personal audience with the disguised Lemrina, and deduces that she is an imposter based on her conflicting accounts of Asseylum's experiences with Inaho on Earth. Now convinced that Inaho is right, Mazuurek sneaks onto Slaine's Landing Castle and returns Asseylum's lost pendant to Edelrittuo with an order for Edelrittuo to return it to Asseylum. Meanwhile, Slaine begins to feel stressed over having to both hide Asseylum's recovery from Lemrina as well as having to lie to Asseylum about what he has done. He confides in Edelrittuo that perhaps his predicament is punishment for losing his faith that Asseylum would ever awaken from her coma. Lemrina eventually becomes distressed because Slaine is gradually growing more distant from her, and discovers that Asseylum is missing from her recovery tank. At the same time, Edelrittuo gives the pendant back to Asseylum, which triggers the full recovery of her memories.
21	"The Fortune's Fool"; Transliteration: "Mugen no Kanata" (Japanese: 夢幻の彼方 ―The Fortune's Fool―)	March 8, 2015
With the Deucalion still undergoing repairs, Inaho and his squad are forced to assault the three Martian Knights again without fire support. Knowing the abilities of the three Knights' Kataphrakts, Inaho devises special strategies to combat them, and two of the knights are quickly defeated. The third Knight proves to be a tougher challenge, as his Kataphrakt has the ability to multiply itself. Inaho deduces that the Kataphrakt multiplies itself using quantum teleportation, and that the only way to defeat it is to destroy every single one of its copies simultaneously. In order to achieve this, Inaho uses his eye to connect to every UFE Kataphrakt on the battlefield (in order to take manual control over them to engage in a simultaneous attack). The plan is successful, and all Martian Kataprakts are destroyed. However, Inaho again begins to suffer pain as a side effect of overusing his eye, and bleeds from his left eye. Meanwhile, the newly repaired Deucalion receives new orders from UFE Command to head for space for a new mission. On the Moon, Lemrina finds and confronts a fully recovered Asseylum, and tells her of what Slaine has been doing while she was unconscious. Shocked, Asseylum confronts Slaine and attempts to arrest him, although Slaine explains that he is no longer a citizen of Vers and therefore no longer under her authority. He has both Asseylum and Lemrina put under house arrest when he receives news that Count Klancain, Cruhteo's son, has arrived from Vers.
22	"Out of the Past"; Transliteration: "Kaikō to Ketsubetsu" (Japanese: 邂逅と訣別 ―Out of the Past―)	March 15, 2015
Slaine greets Klancain and tries to subtly convince him to join his side. However, Klancain is staunchly loyal to the Emperor and remains skeptical of Slaine's motives. Meanwhile, UFE Command decides to assault the Moon Base with the aim of eliminating Princess Asseylum. It is a two-part operation, with the Deucalion assaulting Slaine's Landing Castle to draw enemy forces away while a second UFE force assaults the Moon Base itself. Inaho correctly predicts that the UFE will also send in covert infiltrators to assassinate Asseylum, and infiltrates the base on foot himself. Inside, the UFE infiltrators begin to clash with the base guards, and Asseylum, Lemrina, and Edelrittuo are separated from their guard detail. Lemrina decides to stay behind, leaving Asseylum and Edelrittuo to try and evacuate to the landing bay themselves. Meanwhile, Inaho encounters Slaine and accuses him of exploiting Asseylum like he feared, and they both have a brief gunfight before Inaho is able to escape, albeit injured. He finally manages to find Asseylum, but passes out from his injury. The AI housed within Inaho's cybernetic eye then reveals to Asseylum that Inaho considered Asseylum a part of himself, and prioritises her safety above his own. Touched, Asseylum instructs the eye to tell Inaho that he is a part of her as well (revealing that she similarly has affections for him), and also asks for an unmentioned favor. The AI then instructs Asseylum to head to a designated airlock where Inko will extract her, telling her that help will soon arrive to evacuate Inaho. Asseylum and Edelrittuo reach the designated airlock, but are cornered by a UFE commando. The commando is then shot and killed by Klancain, who introduces himself to Asseylum.
23	"The Unvanquished"; Transliteration: "Inori no Sora" (Japanese: 祈りの空 ―The Unvanquished―)	March 22, 2015
After rescuing Asseylum, Klancain evacuates her and Edelrittuo to his ship against Slaine's wishes. Slaine tries to convince Asseylum to return, but she refuses. With most of the Orbital Knights now loyal to Slaine, Edelrittuo tells Asseylum that she can trust Mazuurek, who agrees to shelter them in his Landing Castle to repay his debt to Inaho. Determined to stop the war, Asseylum makes contact with her grandfather. Unfortunately, she fails to do so, as the Emperor's physical and mental condition have deteriorated significantly due to his advanced age. Meanwhile, Inaho regains consciousness and escapes the Moon base with Inko's assistance. The UFE then temporarily withdraws from the battle to regroup, intending to take the Moon Base in one final attack. Slaine is aware of the UFE attack, and in response, not only sends forces to intercept them, but orders every Orbital Knight stationed on Earth's surface to simultaneously attack as well in order to ensure the complete destruction of the UFE. However, Slaine's orders are interrupted when Asseylum broadcasts a message to both the UFE and the Orbital Knights, proclaiming her intentions to foster peace between Earth and Vers with her official ascension to the throne of Mars as the Empress of Vers. She also announces that she will marry Klancain.
24	"Inherit the Stars"; Transliteration: "Itsuka Mita Ryūsei" (Japanese: いつか見た流星 ―Inherit the Stars―)	March 29, 2015
After Asseylum gives her speech, the Orbital Knights, now in a state of confusion, decide to call off their full-scale attack until they can figure out what is going on. Realizing that the battle is lost, Slaine orders the Moon Base to be evacuated and to surrender to the UFE. Lemrina is put onto a transport ship with the rest of the noncombatants, while Harklight and the rest of Slaine's forces defy Slaine's orders and continue to battle UFE troops. Eventually, they are all completely destroyed in one final, doomed charge against the Deucalion; they are shredded by the Deucalion's CIWS. Seeing that his forces are still fighting and that he has nothing more to lose at this point, Slaine boards the Tharsis and engages Inaho in one-on-one combat. Both pilots manage to inflict heavy damage on each other, with the Tharsis' precognitive ability damaged beyond use with Slaine declaring that he "no longer has any need for the future", and Inaho is physically pained by straining his cybernetic eye's processing capabilities. In the end, Inaho narrowly emerges victorious, but as Tharsis begins to fall into Earth's atmosphere, Inaho saves Slaine's life by grabbing the Tharsis and stabilizing its descent. A pair of children (the same pair from Season 1, Episode 1) in a dilapidated urban area mistake the streaks of light in the sky from Inaho and Slaine's descent for shooting stars. An injured Slaine attempts to crawl away from the wreckage of Tharsis, but Inaho holds him at gunpoint. Smiling, Slaine looks up at Inaho and taps his forehead twice. After the screen cuts to black, it is revealed that some time later, a formal peace agreement has been signed between Earth and Vers, including a trade agreement where Vers would provide Earth with Aldnoah technology in return for natural resources, with Asseylum activating the first Aldnoah Drive delivered to Earth. Asseylum has married Klancain in order to solidify her hold on the Vers throne. Slaine is scapegoated for the war; he is officially reported as having been killed. In reality, Slaine is being held in a high-security secret prison facility. When Inaho appears in the prison to converse with Slaine, Slaine demands to know why Inaho spared his life. Inaho reveals that he was following Asseylum's wishes, as the favor she asked of Inaho in Episode 22 while he was unconscious was to "save Slaine". This causes Slaine to realize Asseylum still cares for him, resulting in Slaine crying as Inaho leaves the prison. The series ends with Asseylum, Inaho, and Slaine smiling as they look forward to the future.
24.5 (OVA)	"The Penultimate Truth"; Transliteration: "Ame no Danshō" (Japanese: 雨の断章 —The Penultimate Truth—)	February 28, 2025 (part of compilation film) March 26, 2025 (Blu-ray Disc Box)
