= Gambling for resurrection =

Situation in international relations

Gambling for resurrection is a situation in international relations when a leader weakened domestically is willing to risk war or prolong war to maintain office.

== Theory ==
The term "gambling for resurrection" was first formalized in academic discourse by George W. Downs and David M. Rocke in their book "Optimal Imperfection? Domestic Uncertainty and Institutions in International Relations" published in 1995. The phrase refers to the risky actions taken by political leaders, particularly when they face domestic challenges or imminent removal from power. These leaders might adopt extreme strategies, such as starting a diversionary war, in the hope that a dramatic success will turn the tide in their favor, thus "resurrecting" their political fortunes.

Gambling for resurrection could also mean prolonging an existing war that should rationally be ended, and might normally have resulted in removal from office or punishment (imprisonment, exile, or death). The leader thus continues the war against the country's interest, adopting risky military strategies in the hope of a dramatic reversal of fortune in the war's outcome. In this situation, escalation is more attractive than peace because the losses are below the leader's removal threshold. Once it appears that the leader will in any case be removed from office, there is no other sanction that can be applied to the leader — who thus has nothing to risk from further escalation, but may win the right to stay in office should the gamble be successful.

== Examples ==
It is seldom possible to provide conclusive proof that a leader's decision to go to war or prolong war is motivated by personal or domestic political issues. However, some conflicts may be seen as gambles for resurrection, including:

- The Argentinian invasion of the Falkland/Malvinas Islands, which was seen as a distraction from President Leopoldo Galtieri's domestic problems, and an attempt to unify the country in its territorial claim over the islands. After her victory in the conflict Margaret Thatcher called a khaki election in the UK, winning decisively, and Galtieri was ousted the same year.
- During the events surrounding the Turkish invasion of Cyprus political leaders in both Turkey and Greece made high-risk decisions to consolidate power amid threats of democratic transition. In Turkey, Prime Minister Bulent Ecevit and his coalition were pressured by rising nationalist sentiment and military expectations, compelling them to respond militarily to a Greek-backed coup in Cyprus, thereby attempting to unify the fragmented political landscape and reinforce their authority. Similarly, the Greek military junta pursued enosis (union) with Cyprus, arguing that this urgent national question justified the continuation of military rule.
- President Bill Clinton was involved in a sex scandal and started three military strikes in 1998 in the heat of the scandal: against Iraq; targets in the Sudan and Afghanistan; and Serbia. This followed just three months after the release of the film "Wag the dog" (see below), and apparently mirrored the film's theme.
- Prime Minister Benjamin Netanyahu has been indicted in a corruption trial and has faced repeated calls for his resignation following the security failures preceding the October 7 attacks and his alleged failure to rescue the kidnapped hostages. In response, Netanyahu has continued to not only double down on the war effort, refusing a ceasefire deal even at the detriment of the hostages, collapsing the war cabinet in the process, but even escalating the conflict between Israel and Hezbollah, invading Syria, and escalating the Iran–Israel proxy conflict, beginning the Twelve-Day War.

== Pop culture influence ==
Gambling for resurrection is often referred to in the mainstream media as "Wag the dog," a reference to a 1997 film by the same name in which a fictional President of the United States starts a fake diversionary war to distract the American public from a sex scandal.
