= Cart before the horse =

Idiom or proverb

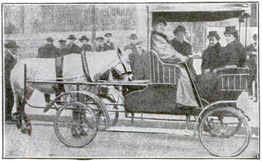
A horse pushing a cart in 1907 Paris

The expression cart before the horse is an idiom or proverb used to suggest something is done contrary to the natural or normally effective sequence of events. A cart is a vehicle that is ordinarily pulled by a horse, so to put the cart before the horse is an analogy for doing things in the wrong order. The figure of speech means doing things the wrong way round or with the wrong emphasis or confusing cause and effect.

The meaning of the phrase is based on the common knowledge that a horse usually pulls a cart, despite rare examples of vehicles pushed by horses in 19th-century Germany and early 20th-century France.

The earliest recorded use of the proverb was in the early 16th century. It was a figure of speech in the Renaissance. A variant of the proverb is used by William Shakespeare in King Lear Act I, scene iv, line 230: "May not an ass know when the cart draws the horse?"

== See also ==
- Hysteron-proteron
- Wag the dog
