= Philippe Le Billon =

Geographer, author, and professor at the University of British Columbia

- Education: Oxford University Pantheon-Sorbonne (Paris 1) University
- Awards: Fulbright Research Chair, UC Berkeley; IAS Scholar, Princeton; International Geneva Award
- Scientific career
- Fields: political economy, political ecology of war, extractive industries, critical minerals, development studies, geopolitics

Philippe Le Billon is a French scholar known for his work on political ecology and the political economy of war. He served with the United Nations Department of Peacekeeping Operations and as a diplomat with the French Ministry of Foreign Affairs, before research appointments at the Overseas Development Institute (ODI) and the International Institute for Strategic Studies (IISS) in London. He has carried out fieldwork in Angola, Cambodia, Colombia, Iraq, Sierra Leone, South Sudan, and the former Yugoslavia, and has consulted for UN agencies and the World Bank. He is Full Professor at the University of British Columbia, and holds a DPhil in Geography from the University of Oxford. He has held visiting appointments as a Fulbright Research Chair at the University of California, Berkeley, a Scholar at the Institute for Advanced Study in Princeton, and a Research Fellow at Sciences Po Paris.

== Early work and education ==
Le Billon was raised in France, with family origins in Brittany. After studying applied economics and public administration at Panthéon-Sorbonne University in Paris, he served in the 1990s with the United Nations Department of Peacekeeping Operations and as a diplomat with the French Ministry of Foreign Affairs. He subsequently completed a doctorate in Geography at the University of Oxford and held a Doctoral Fellowship at the United Nations Institute for Development Economics Research in Helsinki. He later held research posts at the Overseas Development Institute and the International Institute for Strategic Studies in London, with early fieldwork in Angola, Cambodia, Colombia, Iraq, Sierra Leone, South Sudan, and the former Yugoslavia.

== Contributions ==
Working at the environment-development-security nexus, Le Billon has authored over one hundred refereed articles and several books, including on conflict diamonds, corruption in armed conflicts, extractive industries, fossil fuel phase-out initiatives, and the political economy of natural disasters and armed conflicts.

His academic work has been published in leading journals such as Nature, Science Advances, Climate Policy, Global Environmental Change, Political Geography, and the Review of International Political Economy.

He is a founding Director of the Environmental Peacebuilding Association, and serves on the scientific advisory board of Swisspeace as well as the editorial boards of Political Geography and Environment and Security.

His research and commentary have been cited in media outlets including the Financial Times, The Guardian, and The Washington Post.

== Notable works ==
- Le Billon, Philippe (2000). Political Economy of War: What Relief Agencies Need to Know. Overseas Development Institute.
- Le Billon, Philippe (2001). The Political Ecology of War. Political Geography 20(5): 561–584.
- Le Billon, Philippe (2005). Geopolitics of Resource Wars: Resource Dependence, Governance and Violence. London: Frank Cass. ISBN 9780714684970.
- Le Billon, Philippe (2013). Wars of Plunder: Conflicts, Profits and the Politics of Resources. London, New York: Oxford University Press. ISBN 9780190235673.
- Le Billon, Philippe; Bridge, Gavin (2017). Oil (2nd ed.). Cambridge: Polity Press. ISBN 978-1-509-51173-0.
- Le Billon, Philippe; Williams, Aled (2017). Corruption, Natural Resources and Development. Edward Elgar. ISBN 978-1785361197.
- Le Billon, Philippe; Menton Mary (2021). Environmental Defenders. Deadly Struggles for Life and Territory. London: Routledge. ISBN 9780367649647
