= Ming vase strategy =

Political strategy emphasising cautiousness

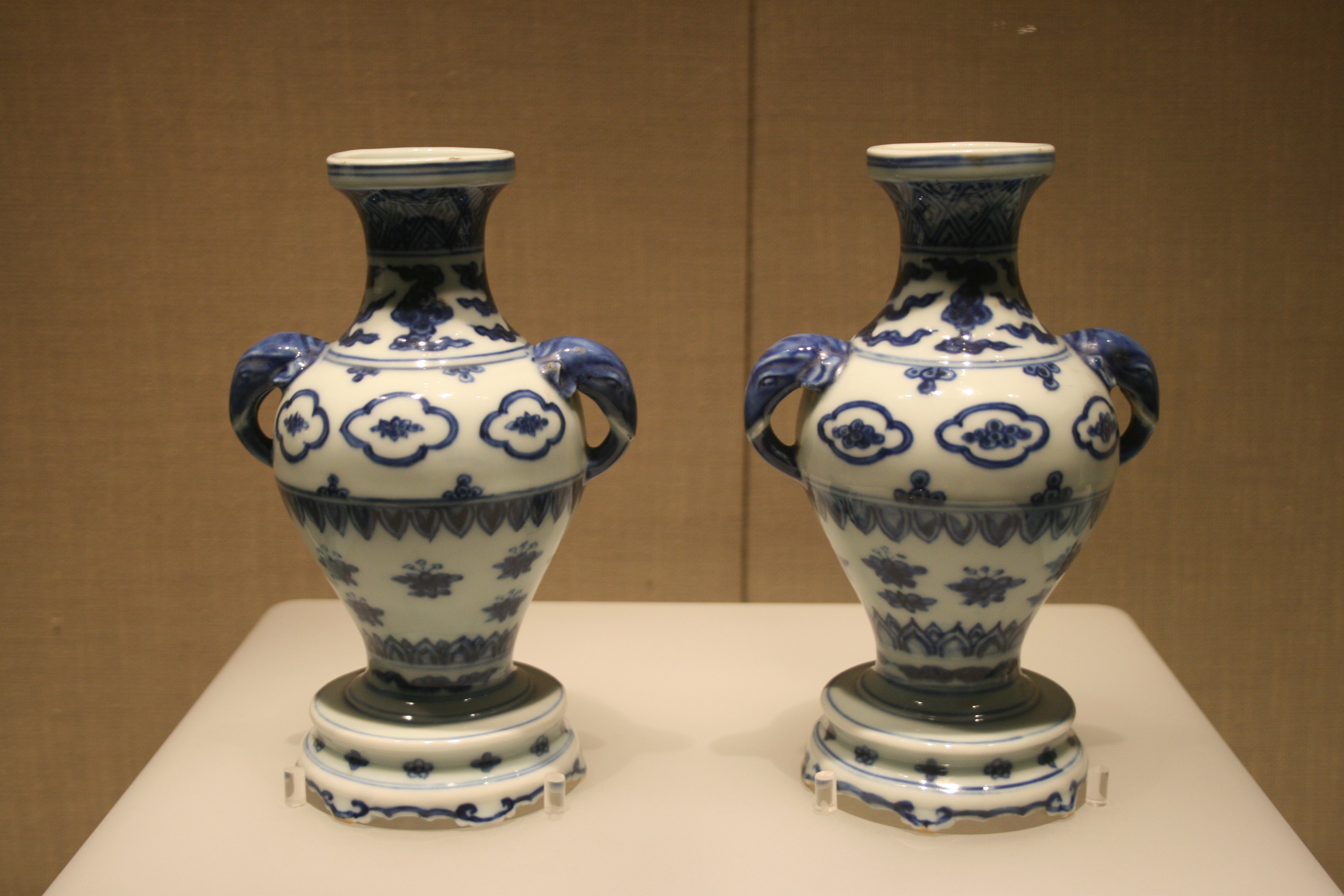
Two Ming vases, from which the strategy takes its name

The Ming vase strategy or small target strategy is a political strategy where a party or candidate emphasises cautious political messaging, light policy detail and criticism of a political opponent rather than one's own platform, with the primary aim of maintaining current support and preventing the loss of more moderate voters to opponents rather than trying to win new voters. The strategy is most closely associated with the successful campaigns of British Labour Party leaders Tony Blair and Keir Starmer for the 1997 and 2024 United Kingdom general elections and Australian Labor Party leader Anthony Albanese for the 2022 Australian federal election. It was also used by Kamala Harris in the 2024 United States presidential election and Olaf Scholz's Social Democratic Party of Germany in the 2021 German federal election.

== Terminology ==
The origin of the phrase in the context of politics originates in the United Kingdom from a speech by Roy Jenkins in the run-up to the 1997 United Kingdom general election. With the election approaching Tony Blair's Labour Party holding a sizeable lead in the opinion polls, they started to compose a manifesto which dropped a number of policy commitments present in the manifesto for the previous election to avoid any controversy which could lose his party support from the electorate. Michael White of The Guardian described the strategy as "stripping down policy commitments, jettisoning those which might embarrass the leadership in the coming election battle". Blair's position of finding a balance between maintaining the support of his party while also appealing to the rest of the electorate was likened by Roy Jenkins in a speech as "a man carrying a delicate Ming vase across a polished museum floor: one slip and it smashes". Blair went on to win the election with a landslide majority.

Since then, the Ming vase terminology has been used occasionally in the following decades to describe various delicate political situations such as the diplomatic situation of South East Asia in the 2010s or the balancing act a politician must do during an election campaign to maintain support while avoiding the alienation of other voters. Since the 2020s, the strategy has been increasingly known as the small target strategy, a termed coined in Australia to describe the Australian Labor Party's successful deployment of the strategy in the 2022 Australian federal election.

== Examples ==
=== 1997 United Kingdom general election ===
British Labour leader Tony Blair deployed the strategy for the 1997 United Kingdom general election in a bid to maintain its large opinion poll lead. Under Blair's leadership, Labour shifted towards the political centre and dropped several policy pledges deemed "electorally toxic" from its platform under the New Labour brand, including wealth redistribution and progressive taxation, continuing a process initiated by his predecessors John Smith and Neil Kinnock where policies such as nationalisation were abandoned to make the party "electable". In the run-up to the election, Blair, although personally supportive of further integration with the European Union and joining the Eurozone, pledged that Britain would only adopt the Euro if this passed in a referendum. Other policies abandoned by Blair under the Ming vase strategy which were previously included in Labour's manifesto for the 1992 general election under Kinnock included the abolition of the House of Lords, the repeal of Thatcherite trade union laws, the abolition of grammar schools, increases to the state pension, the reversal of private outsourcing in the NHS, and the commitment to tax and spend, which was replaced with "save and invest". The party also toned down any references to socialism. Labour went on to win the election in an historic landslide, with Blair becoming the first British party leader to win a majority of over 400 seats.

=== 2021 German federal election ===
The Ming vase strategy was adopted by the Social Democratic Party of Germany under Olaf Scholz for the 2021 German federal election, who shifted his party to the centre, adopted a light policy platform and focussed on attacking the incumbent Christian Democratic Union, which had led the government since 2005, while also presenting Scholz as a continuity candidate to the popular outgoing CDU chancellor Angela Merkel. Scholz's SPD unexpectedly became the front-runner in the election and would go on to win enough seats to become the largest party, but fell short of winning a majority as is typical of the German electoral system, opting to form a coalition government with the Greens and Free Democratic Party and Scholz as chancellor.

=== 2022 Australian federal election ===
In the run-up to the 2022 Australian federal election, the Australian Labor Party under Anthony Albanese deployed the strategy, aiming to win the election by running on a light policy platform and primarily focussing on attacking their opponents, avoiding controversial policy pledges which could be used by their opponents as an attack. This included dropping previous policy commitments, such as reforms to capital gains tax and negative gearing, and accepting some policies of the governing Liberal–National Coalition under Prime Minister Scott Morrison, including cuts to income tax and increases to fuel subsidies and defence spending. Albanese adopted the strategy to avoid a repeat of the 2019 federal election, where Labor suffered an upset defeat to the Coalition despite leading in the opinion polls, which was attributed to a heavy and ambitious policy platform promising wide-reaching changes to Australian society. Labor's use of the strategy proved a success, with the party maintaining an opinion poll lead from June 2021 and going on to win the election with a majority.

=== 2024 United Kingdom general election ===
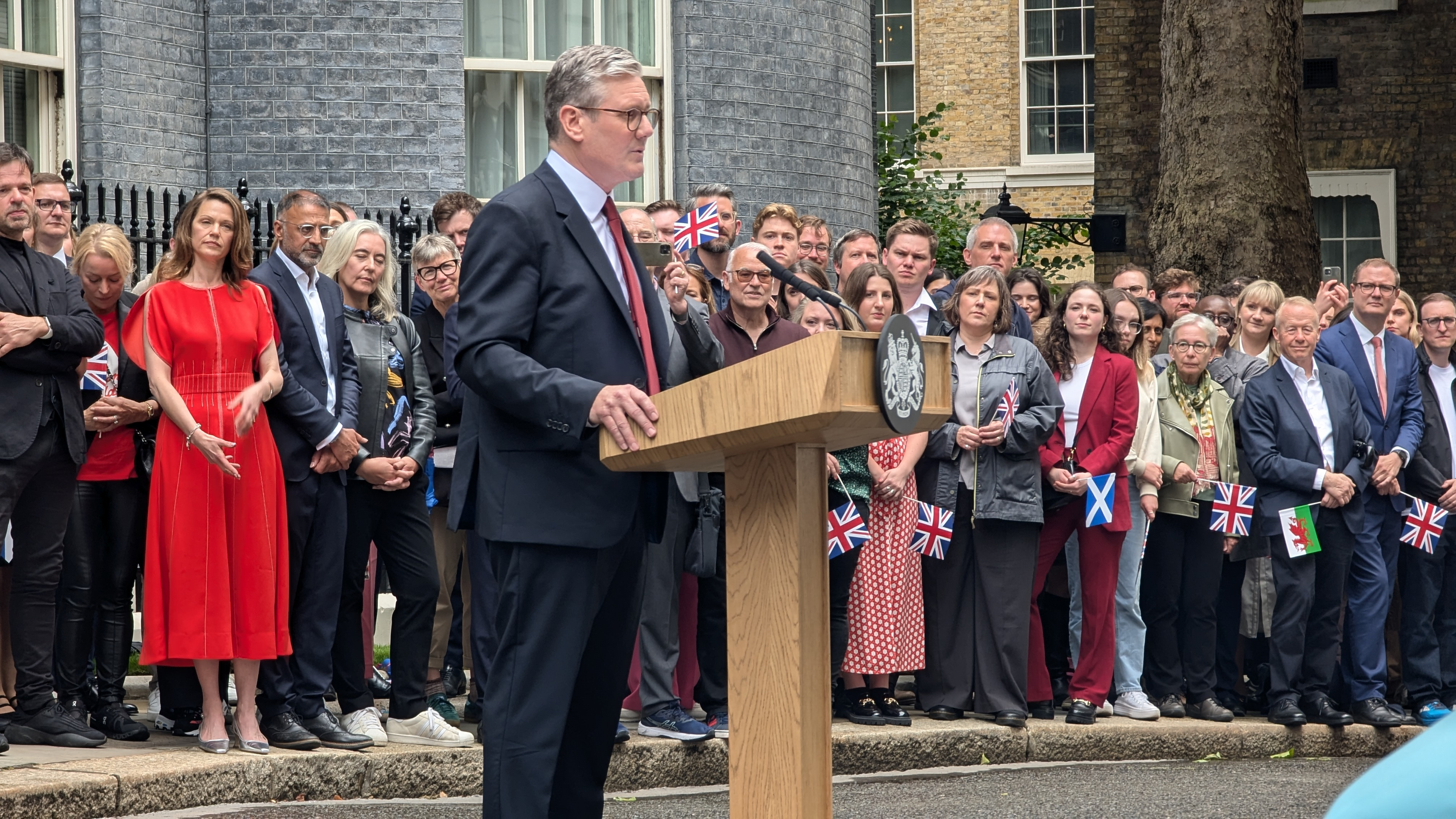
British Labour Party leader Keir Starmer in Downing Street after his party's victory in the 2024 United Kingdom general election

The success of the strategy for the Social Democratic Party of Germany in 2021 and the Australian Labor Party in 2022 inspired its adoption by British Labour leader Keir Starmer in the run-up to the 2024 United Kingdom general election. Starmer was elected leader of the Labour Party following Labour's landslide defeat to Boris Johnson's Conservatives at the 2019 United Kingdom general election. As leader of the opposition, Starmer adopted a cautious electoral strategy to contrast himself from his predecessor Jeremy Corbyn. He employed a safety first approach to avoid all possible lines of attack, avoiding going into too much policy detail and driven by a desire to avoid uncalculated promises for fear of press reaction. This included preventing a number of prominent party members from standing for election due to previous controversy, including Corbyn.

Starmer's adoption of the strategy appeared effective, with Labour securing a 20-point opinion poll lead from late 2022. However, it was also criticised by some observers, who believed it focussed too much on swing voters, was likely to alienate traditional Labour supporters and allowed other parties to set the agenda by avoiding attention grabbing headlines. William Keegan of The Guardian criticised Labour's use of the strategy, saying that it was "depressingly cautious" and that "many natural Labour voters are asking themselves: what is the point?". Proponents of the strategy however compared it to Tony Blair's election victory in 1997, pointing out that many of his policy achievements did not feature in the manifesto, such as granting the Bank of England independence over monetary policy.

The strategy initially proved to be successful, with Starmer's Labour Party going on to win the general election by a landslide. He became the second party leader to win over 400 seats after Blair, securing a supermajority with only marginal gains in vote share due to a highly efficient, broad but shallow voter distribution under the first-past-the-post electoral system. Jonny Ball of the New Statesman wrote that the strategy had been "frustrating" during the election, but that it "has worked for now." However, it soon drew criticism after Starmer entered office with negative approval ratings, with Labour's opinion poll lead soon collapsing to the party's lowest polled share of the vote on record. The Times concluded that it left a government devoid of vision, stating that "the impression persists that the country doesn't quite know who, exactly, it has voted for", with the government now limited by ruling out possible policies during the election campaign. Alistair Carmichael compared it to Blair's landslide victory in 1997, writing that while Blair became bolder after winning the election, in Starmer's case it left the government with "very little idea of what to do". Following Starmer's resignation the strategy was highlighted as a possible reason for the failure of his premiership as it had forced him to rule out necessary tax rises, severely limiting what he would be able to do in government.

=== 2024 United States presidential election ===
American Democratic politician Kamala Harris consulted Starmer about the Ming vase strategy for her campaign in the 2024 United States presidential election. Harris adopted the strategy for her campaign, dropping her more progressive policies for more moderate ones and also avoiding interviews to avoid questions on her political stances. She went on to lose the election to Republican candidate Donald Trump, who adopted a more populist and aggressive campaign strategy. The Economist concluded that Harris's strategy failed in a climate of high inflation and illegal immigration, issues which Trump campaigned against, and that she therefore failed to present herself as offering "meaningful change".

== See also ==
- Dead cat strategy
- Political strategy
