= 101 Uses for a Dead Cat =

1981 book by Simon Bond

- Original cover
- Author: Simon Bond
- Genre: Black comedy, Cartoons
- Published: 1981
- Publication place: United States
- ISBN: 0-517-54516-0

101 Uses for a Dead Cat, by Simon Bond (1947–2011), was a bestselling collection of macabre cartoons. The book was promoted with the tag line, "Since time immemorial mankind has been plagued by the question, 'What do you do with a dead cat?'" It consisted of cartoons depicting the bodies of dead cats being used for various purposes, including anchoring boats, sharpening pencils and holding bottles of wine.

== Release and sequels ==
First published in the UK in 1981 as A Hundred and One Uses for a Dead Cat, the collection was eventually republished in 20 countries and sold over 2 million copies. It spawned two sequels, 101 More Uses for a Dead Cat and Uses of a Dead Cat in History, as well as calendars featuring the cartoons and even a book in response called The Cat's Revenge - More Than 101 Uses for Dead People. In 2006, a 25th anniversary edition of A Hundred and One Uses of a Dead Cat was published with a new foreword.

== Reception ==
By December 7, 1981, it had spent 27 weeks on the New York Times Best Seller list. Its success was considered part of a larger "cat craze" in popular culture, which included the Jim Davis comic strip Garfield, and the Andrew Lloyd Webber musical Cats.

Time called the author and illustrator, Simon Bond, "the Charles Addams of ailurophobia." He received hate mail accusing him of obscenity and sadism.

American Opinion stated that those who read the book should be "prepared to be disgusted or appalled from time to time".

The book was parodied by British cartoonist Patrick Wright with his book 101 Uses for a John Major, in which the former British Prime Minister was illustrated serving a number of bizarre purposes, such as a train-spotter's anorak or as a flag-pole.

== See also ==
- Earl the Dead Cat — "a flat, understuffed toy cat with X's for eyes" which came "with a humorous death certificate listing all the reasons a dead cat is better than a live one"; produced and sold by the makers of the Croc O' Shirt line of apparel
