= Rally 'round the flag effect =

Increased short-run support for a leader in crisis or war

United States president George W. Bush approval rating from 2001 to 2006. Spikes in approval coincide with the September 11 attacks, the invasion of Iraq, and the capture of Saddam Hussein.

In political science, the rally 'round the flag effect (also referred to as the rally 'round the flag syndrome) is the phenomenon of increased short-run popular support of a country's government or political leaders during periods of international crisis or war. Because the effect can reduce criticism of governmental policies, it can be seen as a factor of diversionary foreign policy. The concept originated in analysis of the United States during the Cold War, but has since been applied to governments around the world.

== Mueller definition ==
Political scientist John Mueller suggested the effect in an American context in 1970, in a paper called "Presidential Popularity from Truman to Johnson". He defined it as coming from an event with three qualities:

1. "Is international"
2. "Involves the United States and particularly the President directly"
3. "Specific, dramatic, and sharply focused"

In addition, Mueller created five categories of rallies. Mueller's five categories are:

1. Sudden US military intervention (e.g., Korean War, Bay of Pigs Invasion)
2. Major diplomatic actions (e.g., Truman Doctrine)
3. Dramatic technological developments (e.g., Sputnik)
4. US-Soviet summit meetings (e.g., Potsdam Conference)
5. Major military developments in ongoing wars (e.g., Tet Offensive)

These categories are considered dated by modern political scientists, as they rely heavily on Cold War events.

The name of the effect was taken from "Battle Cry of Freedom", an American Civil War song that urged union supporters to "rally 'round the flag" and was used for Abraham Lincoln's re-election campaign.

== Causes and duration ==
Since Mueller's original theories, two schools of thought have emerged to explain the causes of the effect. The first, "The Patriotism School of Thought" holds that in times of crisis, the American public sees the head of state as the embodiment of national unity, rather than as an actual political figure as they are perceived as in times of peace. The second, "The Opinion Leadership School" believes that the rally emerges from a lack of criticism from members of the opposition party, most often in the United States Congress. If opposition party members appear to support the head of state, the media has no conflict to report, thus it appears to the public that all is well with the performance of the president. The two theories have both been criticized, but it is generally accepted that the Patriotism School of thought is better to explain causes of rallies, while the Opinion Leadership School of thought is better to explain duration of rallies. It is also believed that the lower the presidential approval rating before the crisis, the larger the increase will be in terms of percentage points because it leaves the president more room for improvement. For example, Franklin D. Roosevelt only had a 12pp increase in approval from 72% to 84% following the Attack on Pearl Harbor, whereas George W. Bush had a 39pp increase from 51% to 90% following the September 11 attacks.

Another theory about the cause of the effect is believed to be embedded in the US Constitution. Unlike in other countries, the constitution makes the President both head of government and head of state. Because of this, the president receives a temporary boost in popularity because his Head of State role gives him symbolic importance to the American people. However, as time goes on his duties as Head of Government require partisan decisions that polarize opposition parties and diminish popularity. This theory falls in line more with the Opinion Leadership School.

Due to the highly statistical nature of presidential polls, University of Alabama political scientist John O'Neal has approached the study of rally 'round the flag using mathematics. O'Neal has postulated that the Opinion Leadership School is the more accurate of the two using mathematical equations. These equations are based on quantified factors such as the number of headlines from The New York Times about the crisis, the presence of bipartisan support or hostility, and prior popularity of the president.

Political Scientist from The University of California Los Angeles, Matthew A. Baum found that the source of a rally 'round the flag effect is from independents and members of the opposition party shifting their support behind the President after the rallying effect. Baum also found that when the country is more divided or in a worse economic state then the rally effect is larger. This is because more people who are against the president before the rallying event switch to support him afterwards. When the country is divided before the rallying event there is a higher potential increase in support for the President after the rallying event.

Georgetown University political scientist Jonathan McDonald Ladd found that the post-9/11 rally in approval for George W. Bush was larger and more uniform among Americans who were less informed about politics. In contrast, Americans who were more informed about politics only increased their approval of Bush if they had previously supported a more aggressive foreign policy.

In a study by Political Scientist Terrence L. Chapman and Dan Reiter, rallies in Presidential approval ratings were found to be bigger when there was U.N. Security Council supported Militarized interstate disputes (MIDs). Having U.N. Security Council support was found to increase the rally effect in presidential approval by 8 to 9 points compared to when there was not U.N. Security Council support.

According to a 2019 study of ten countries in the period 1990–2014, there is evidence of a rally-around-the-flag effect early on in an intervention with military casualties (in at least the first year) but voters begin to punish the governing parties after 4.5 years. A 2021 study found weak effects for the rally-around-the-flag effect. A 2023 study found that militarized interstate disputes, on average, decrease public support for national leaders rather than increase it.

A 2022 study applies the same logic of rally effects to crisis termination instead of just onset. Using all available public presidential polling and crisis data from 1953 to 2016, the researchers found that a president received a three-point increase to their approval rating, on average, when terminating an international crisis. They suggest that the surge in approvals is as much related to a proof of a president's foreign affairs competency, as it is related to a mutual camaraderie in defense of the nation. Additionally, the suggestion that a president can achieve approval boosts via ending conflict instead of initiating conflict makes less cynical assumptions about the options within a president's toolkit and provide an additional avenue for inquiry into diversionary war theories.

== Historical examples ==
The effect has been examined within the context of nearly every major foreign policy crisis since World War II. Some notable examples:

=== World War I ===
During World War I, most belligerents saw a lessening of partisanship. Most socialist parties abandoned their pledges to oppose wars and endorsed their governments, leading to the break-up of the Second International. This was part of the Spirit of 1914

- In the German Empire, the Social Democratic Party enabled the German entry into the war by voting in favor of war credits at the Reichstag and supported the government for most of the war. Kaiser Wilhelm II subsequently declared a Burgfrieden in which normal partisan politics would be suspended.
- The French Third Republic declared a similar Sacred Union which was embraced by most socialist parties. The French Section of the Workers' International leader Jean Jaurès was assassinated while preparing to give what the French nationalist assassin Raoul Villain believed would be a pacifist speech.
- The United Kingdom of Great Britain and Ireland also saw a lessening of political instability and militancy as Irish nationalist, suffragette, and trade unionist dissidents supported the war. In particular the Curragh mutiny, in which many Ulster Protestants and some officers of the British Armed Forces with the support of the Conservative Party refused to recognize the impending implementation of Irish Home Rule and threatened civil war, immediately ended with the British entry into the war and an upswell of support for the Liberal government. Later, the Coalition Liberal-Conservative government of David Lloyd George used its wartime support to call a "coupon election" in 1918 in which candidates endorsed by the government with a "Coalition Coupon" won a massive landslide and decimated the Liberal Party.

=== World War II ===
During World War II, British Prime Minister Winston Churchill enjoyed massive popularity in the United Kingdom for opposing the National Government's foreign policy of appeasement towards Nazi Germany before the war and for saving the country from near-defeat in the Battle of Britain afterwards. All major parties in the British Parliament, including the opposition Labour Party, joined Churchill's war ministry. His approval ratings never declined below 78 percent for his entire wartime premiership. Churchill's personal popularity did not extend to the Conservative Party, which opposed the welfare state and nationalisation advocated by Labour and remained associated with appeasement and interwar unemployment and poverty. As a result, the Conservatives heavily lost the 1945 general election to Labour.

=== Contemporary history ===
==== United States ====
- Cuban Missile Crisis: According to Gallup polls, President John F. Kennedy's approval rating in early October 1962 was at 61%. By November, after the crisis had passed, Kennedy's approval rose to 74%. The spike in approval peaked in December 1962 at 76%. By June 1963, Kennedy's approval rating had declined to its pre-crisis level of 61%.
- Iran hostage crisis: According to Gallup polls, President Jimmy Carter saw his approval rating surge to 61%, up 23 points from his pre-crisis rating, following the initial seizure of the U.S. embassy in Tehran in November 1979. However, Carter's handling of the crisis caused popular support to decrease, and by November 1980 Carter had returned to his pre-crisis approval rating.
- Gulf War: According to Gallup polls, President George H. W. Bush was rated at 59% approval in January 1991, but following the success of Operation Desert Storm, Bush enjoyed a peak 89% approval rating in February 1991. Bush's approval rating then substantially declined, returning to its pre-crisis level of 61% in October.
- Following the September 11 attacks in 2001, President George W. Bush received an unprecedented increase in his approval rating. On 10 September, Bush had a Gallup Poll rating of 51%. By 15 September, his approval rate had increased by 34 percentage points to 85%. Just a week later, Bush was at 90%, the highest presidential approval rating ever. Over a year after the attacks occurred, Bush still received higher approval than he did before 9/11 (68% in November 2002). Both the size and duration of Bush's popularity after 9/11 are believed to be the largest of any post-crisis boost. Many people believe that this popularity gave Bush a mandate and eventually the political leverage to invade Iraq in 2003.
- Killing of Osama bin Laden: According to Gallup polls, President Barack Obama received a slight uptick in his approving ratings following the 2 May 2011 killing of bin Laden, jumping from 45% in late April to 53% after bin Laden's death was announced. The rally effect did not last long, as Obama's approval ratings were back down to 45% by 15 July.
- Sandy Hook Elementary School shooting: Following the shooting in December 2012, President Obama received another slight uptick in approval according to Gallup, increasing from 50% before the shooting to 56% shortly after. The rally effect was over by 17 January 2013.
- Killing of Ayman al-Zawahiri: According to Gallup polls, President Joe Biden received a small uptick in approval (from 38% to 44%) shortly after ordering a drone strike that killed al-Zawahiri on 31 July 2022. Afterwards, his approval ratings declined for the remainder of 2022.
- Capture of Nicolás Maduro: After the strikes on Venezuela, a poll by Reuters recorded a small increase (from 41% to 42%) to President Donald Trump approval rating based on 1,248 U.S. adults nationwide, although it is possible this was unrelated.

==== Other countries ====
- In Turkey, following the Justice and Development Party's June 2015 electoral setback, Recep Tayyip Erdoğan resumed military hostilities to boost nationalist votes, dissolved the freshly elected parliament and successfully won the November 2015 Turkish general election. The induced Third PKK insurgency (2015–2025) lead to 30,000 more deaths : over 7,000 in Turkey and 23,000 in foreign operations.
- The Russo-Ukrainian War caused an increase of support for President Vladimir Putin in Russia. His approval rating rose 10 percent to 71.6 percent after he announced the Russian annexation of Crimea. His approval rating also rose from 69 percent in January 2022 to 83 percent in March, as did support for Prime Minister Mikhail Mishustin, as a result of the Russian invasion of Ukraine. The said war caused an even larger boost of both domestic and international support for Ukrainian President Volodymyr Zelenskyy, with his approval rating rising from 30 percent to 90 percent in Ukraine and also rising to 70 percent in the United States.
- Israeli prime minister Benjamin Netanyahu has been accused of prolonging the Gaza war to maintain popularity and his premiership.
- The Twelve-Day War led to increased popular support within Iran for the incumbent Islamic Republic, including from opponents of the regime, though out of a pretext of nationalism rather than outright support for the establishment.
- The 2025–26 United States trade war with Canada and Mexico led to increased domestic support for Mexican president Claudia Sheinbaum, with her approval rating rising to 80%, and for the ruling Liberal Party in Canada, with a large upswing in approval ratings recorded for newly elected Prime Minister Mark Carney.
- The diplomatic crisis between China and Japan that started in November 2025 caused a boost in domestic support for incumbent Japanese Prime Minister Sanae Takaichi, which culminated in the ruling Liberal Democratic Party's landslide win in the 2026 general election.
- The Greenland crisis between December 2025 and January 2026 led to increased public support for Danish Prime Minister Mette Frederiksen, prompting her to announce a snap election on 24 March 2026 to capitalise on her boost in support.
- The 2026 Iran war resulted in a rally effect around the Islamic regime, with support for the Iranian opposition reportedly dipping in response to the scale and violence of United States strikes on the country.

== In a pandemic ==
The popularity of the incumbent Conservative Party (blue) spiked in the weeks following the COVID-19 outbreak in the United Kingdom.

The outbreak of the COVID-19 pandemic in 2020 briefly resulted in popularity spikes for several world leaders. President Donald Trump's approval rating saw a slight increase during the outbreak in early 2020. In addition to Trump, other heads of government in Europe also gained in popularity. French President Emmanuel Macron, Italian Prime Minister Giuseppe Conte, Dutch Prime Minister Mark Rutte, and British Prime Minister Boris Johnson became "very popular" in the weeks following the pandemic hitting their respective nations. Johnson, in particular, who "became seriously ill himself" from COVID-19, led his government to become "the most popular in decades." It was uncertain how long their increase in the approval polls would last, but former NATO secretary general George Robertson opined, "People do rally around, but it evaporates fast."

== Controversy and fears of misuse ==
There are fears that a leader will abuse the rally 'round the flag effect. These fears come from the diversionary theory of war in which a leader creates an international crisis to distract from domestic affairs and to increase their approval ratings through a rally 'round the flag effect. The fear associated with this theory is that a leader can create international crises to avoid dealing with serious domestic issues or to increase their approval rating when it begins to drop.

America and Israel's unprovoked attack on Iran was seen by some commentators as an effort to distract from his administration's various controversies, including the failure to completely release the Epstein files, in which Trump is mentioned by name more than a million times.

== See also ==
- List of heads of the executive by approval rating
- United States presidential approval rating
- Flag-waving
