= Dead cat bounce =

Small, brief recovery in the price of a declining stock

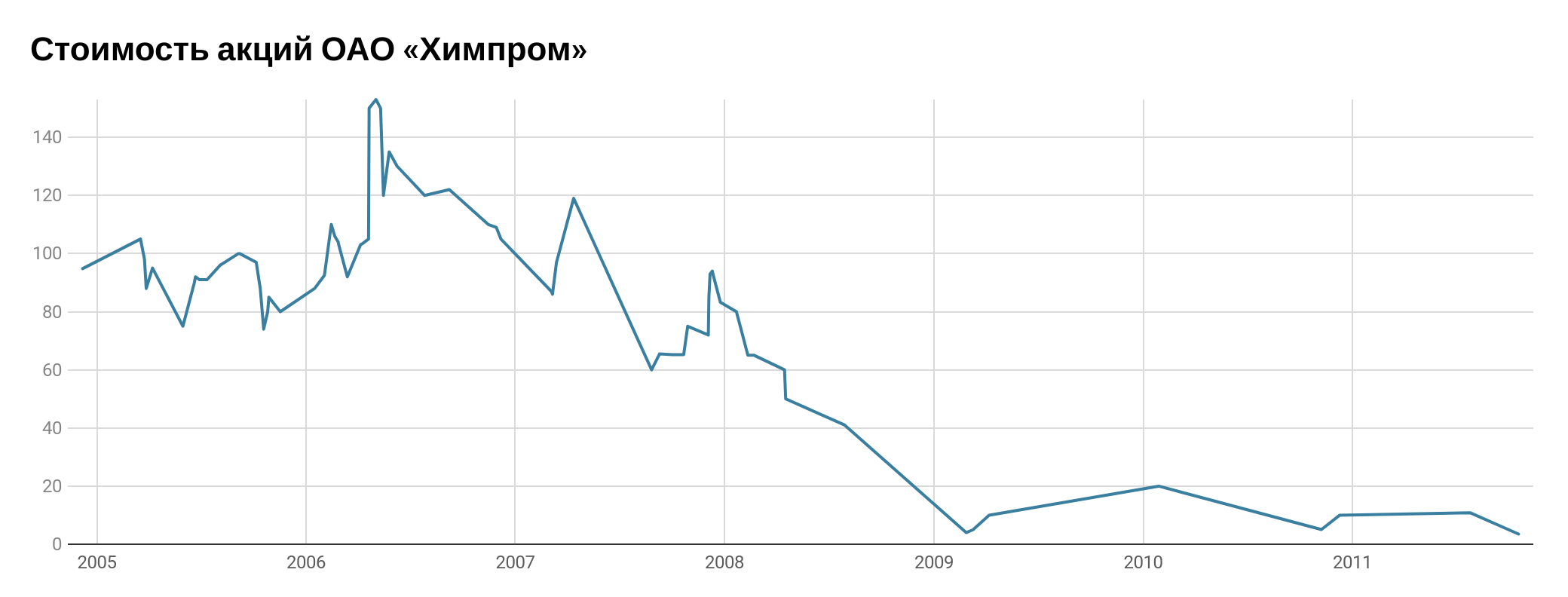
Two examples of a dead cat bounce can be seen in the stock price of Khimprom Volgograd between 2007-2008.

In finance, a dead cat bounce is a small, brief recovery in the price of a declining asset. Derived from the idea that "even a dead cat will bounce if it falls from a great height", the phrase is also popularly applied to any case where a subject experiences a brief resurgence during or following a severe decline. This may also be known as a "sucker rally".

== History ==
The earliest citation of the phrase in the news media dates to December 1985 when the Singaporean and Malaysian stock markets bounced back after a hard fall during the recession of that year. Journalists Chris Sherwell and Wong Sulong of the London-based Financial Times were quoted as saying the market rise was "what we call a dead cat bounce". Both the Singaporean and Malaysian financial markets continued to fall.

The phrase was used again the following year about falling oil prices. In the San Jose Mercury News, Raymond F. DeVoe Jr. proposed that "Beware the Dead Cat Bounce" be printed on bumper stickers and followed up with a graphic explanation. This quote was referenced throughout the 1990s and became widely used in the 2000s.

"This applies to stocks or commodities that have gone into free-fall descent and then rallied briefly. If you threw a dead cat off a 50-story building, it might bounce when it hit the sidewalk. But don't confuse that bounce with renewed life. It is still a dead cat. The spot oil price has recovered from under $10 a barrel to over $13 -- but that also should not be confused with renewed life."

— Raymond F. DeVoe Jr., San Jose Mercury News, 28 April 1986

The phrase is also used in political circles for a candidate or policy that shows a small positive bounce in approval after a hard and fast decline.

== Technical analysis ==
A "dead cat bounce" price pattern may be used as a part of the technical analysis method of stock trading. Technical analysis describes a dead cat bounce as a continuation pattern in which a reversal of the current decline occurs followed by a significant price recovery. The price fails to continue upward and instead falls again downwards, often surpassing the previous low. This phenomenon can be difficult to identify at the time of occurrence, and like market peaks and troughs, it is usually only with hindsight that the pattern is able to be recognised.

== Causes ==
=== Technical factors ===
Technical factors, such as a short position from many firms, can help in the formation of a dead cat bounce. As many investors buy back their shares to close a short position, the stock receives a temporary increase in demand, driving up the price of the stock. Additionally, if the stock has an established history of a stable, continuous and periodic fluctuation between a support price and a resistance price, a low stock price may result in investors buying shares under the belief that the stock price is still following the same trend. This has the same effect as the short covering where the price receives a short boost.

=== News and events ===
Positive news relevant to the stock can provide a temporary boost of investor sentiment. This can be the result of a partnership agreement or a new product. In turn, this provides a short boost to the demand for the stock even though the underlying cause of the decline in price has not changed.

=== Market sentiment ===
The market sentiment refers to the attitude of investors towards a market. Should many stocks within the same financial market show a positive trend, then the entire financial market may be favored by investors. A "bullish" market refers to a market which is predicted to undergo a positive price movement. Should an entire market experience an increase in demand, even stocks with a falling price can be positively benefited.

=== Market manipulation ===
Tactics used by market manipulators may be used to temporarily inflate prices in an effort of personal gain. Tactics such as a spreading false rumors or engaging in a pump-and-dump will result in a short-lived increase in price.

== See also ==
- Don't fight the tape
- Market trend
- Double-dip recession
- Dead cat strategy
