= Diversionary foreign policy =

Conflict instigated to distract from domestic strife

A diversionary foreign policy, or a diversionary war, is an international relations term that identifies a war instigated by a country's leader in order to distract its population from its own domestic strife. The concept stems from the Diversionary War Theory, which states that leaders who are threatened by domestic turmoil may initiate an international conflict in order to improve their standing. There are two primary mechanisms behind diversionary war: a manipulation of the rally 'round the flag effect, causing an increase of national fervor from the general public, and "gambling for resurrection", whereby a leader in a perilous domestic situation takes high-risk foreign policy decisions with a small chance of success but with a high reward if successful.

Scholars of international relations have dedicated much research to the practical application of diversionary war. A large percentage investigates presidents of the United States and their disputed culpability for partaking in diversionary foreign policy. Despite the immense amount of effort and research, scholars have not yet formed a consensus on the accuracy of the theory, and empirical evidence is mixed at best.

== Effects ==
=== Intended ===
Generally, the pursuit of a diversionary foreign policy may offer the leader in power four benefits, all of which increase their ability to remain in power:

1. A successful diversionary foreign policy could increase support for the domestic regime. This in turn increases the government's time to address their internal trouble.
2. Artificial tension created from the international conflict may justify a leader's suppression of dissent.
3. The war abroad could distract the population from the issues that induced the original dissatisfaction with the government.
4. The external threat may unify the country through the rally 'round the flag effect by creating a new out-group other than the government for the population to direct its dissatisfaction.

=== Negative ===
However, all of these benefits depend on success in said diversionary foreign policy. Failure in these international actions would backfire against the leader's initial intent. As a result, the leader would likely face more domestic strife, possibly hastening their loss of power. Nevertheless, this possible negative effect is addressed in the Diversionary War Theory. The theory itself states that rational leaders facing a near inevitable removal from office become more likely to gamble on a risky diversionary war. If the existing dissatisfaction is prompting their removal from office, a diversionary foreign policy only leaves room for gain.

== Evolution ==
Although the theory was not officially addressed in academia until the past half-century, the benefits of a diversionary foreign policy had long been accepted by governments and others as conventional wisdom.

In 1956, Simmel and Lewis A. Coser both published work applying the in-group/out-group psychology hypothesis towards International Relations. Essentially, their work postulated that populations of nations increase their cohesion during times of conflict with an out-group (another nation, organization, etc.). This often includes rallying around the country's leader. As an example, President George W. Bush's approval ratings soared to 80% following the attacks on September 11, 2001. This type of response suggests that leaders have an incentive to manufacture conflict whenever they are in the need of a boost of popularity. However, a 2022 study found that, using similar logic, presidents receive similar approval boosts when terminating a conflict. This lessens the cynicism required for most theories of diversionary foreign policy and shows evidence of another tool presidents can, and may, use for diversionary purposes.

From this assertion, scholars have used this conventional wisdom to expand and test the theory's true applications. A significant number of studies have attempted to establish connections between the instigation of war as a way to divert attention from a struggling economy, or general low approval ratings. In addition, the theory has diverged into contemporary and traditional perspectives.

== Conditions that lead to diversionary foreign policy ==
The purpose of diversionary foreign policy is to divert the attention of the public away from domestic issues. This means that the conditions leading to diversionary tactics include any sort of domestic unrest. This incorporates dissatisfaction with domestic policies and poor economic conditions. The theory predicts that the use of external force will increase the chance of reelection, so it would be used during a time when the president does not seem to have a good chance of reelection. The necessary conditions of the opposing state differ based on which theory one ascribes to, traditional or contemporary. The traditional view of diversionary foreign policy suggests that a state will target another in which conflict is likely to be prolonged, which would be against states with comparable military capabilities. According to this point of view, the prospect of victory is not the most important aspect in choosing an enemy because it is based on a sociological "in-group/out-group" perspective. This refers to the increase of cohesion among the "in-group" because of the common enemy or "out-group". On the other hand, contemporary diversionary theory states that, due to the uncertainty of international relations and the high cost of war, a state is more likely to prey on a weaker state where victory will be more quickly and easily obtained. Overall, diversionary foreign policy is more likely seen in a major power because they are less constrained by the international community. It is also seen more in democracies where the government needs to be more responsive to public sentiment. Election cycles have a lot to do with diversionary wars because a war ideally increases the chance that the incumbent administration will remain.

The dynamics of diversionary behavior in nondemocratic regimes is less clear, as autocratic leaders may not be beholden to election cycles or may be less affected by negative sentiment in ways their democratic counterparts would be, and thus may not be a cause of diversionary war. Autocracies thus face varying levels of domestic constraint and diverse goals which may be absent in representative societies, and the leadership of these states may not wish to risk war. The institutional composition of a regime may serve as a determining factor in the diversionary goals and resultant choice of diversionary foreign policy in these states, as the level of control in highly institutionalized autocracies allows for the effective use of traditionally overlooked, and comparatively peaceful diversionary strategies outside of war.

== Examples ==
=== Pre World War II ===
==== Hundred Years War ====
In 1415, King Henry V of England invaded France shortly after his succession to the throne, resulting in a short campaign and a resounding victory at the Battle of Agincourt. This campaign initiated the third phase of the Hundred Years' War (1415–1453) termed the Lancastrian War.

Sir John Keegan has opined that the primary motivation for Henry's decision to invade France (ostensibly asserting, "on dubious legal grounds", a claim to the succession of the French throne), was to solidify his popularity at home and quell unrest from other English nobles, several of whom questioned the legitimacy of his dynasty, since his father, Henry IV, had usurped the throne from Richard II.

==== French Revolutionary Wars of 1792 ====
In 1792, the French Government comprised a newly formed National Assembly, which had replaced King Louis XVI. In order to unify its citizens under the new flag and new leadership, the National Assembly began the French Revolutionary Wars. It first declared war on Austria, soon to be joined by Prussia.

==== Invasion of Algiers (1830) ====
A number of writers and historians contend that Charles X's decision to invade the Regency of Algiers in 1830 (which marked the beginning of a French conquest of Algeria that would last decades) was, as least partly, motivated by a desire to distract the French public from his government's increasing unpopularity. Rachel Eva Schley states that in 1827, Minister of War Aimé-Marie-Gaspard de Clermont-Tonnerre believed that "a political and military distraction was imperative" to boost the king's international stature, and to divert attention away "from troubles at home."

==== Franco-Prussian War ====
Otto von Bismarck utilized diversionary foreign policy often during his quest to unify Germany. These wars distracted the German people from the cultural differences that previously had prevented them from forming a single country. Bismarck used the success of the 1870–1871 Franco-Prussian War in a similar fashion, officially establishing a German Empire following the siege of Paris.

==== Russo-Japanese War ====
One historical example that demonstrates the conventional acceptance of the effectiveness of a diversionary war is the Russo-Japanese War of 1904. During the months leading up war, Russia experienced numerous workers strikes that lead to internal unsettledness. These strikes coincided with the Russians' negotiations with the Japanese over expansion in Manchuria and Korea. It has been argued that, as a way to distract their population, Tsar Nicholas II and his ministers decided to goad the Japanese into declaring war, thereby turning Japan into the needed out-group. In fact, Russia's Minister of the Interior, Vyacheslav von Plehve, stated before starting the war:

What this country needs is a short victorious war to stem the tide of revolution.

Clearly, at least some of the Russians in power at the time believed that by a diversionary war, they would be able to distract their population from the domestic troubles that had been haunting Russia. However, there is some evidence that the Tsar himself, and some of his advisors, did not believe that, being viewed as overmatched, Japan would be willing to go to war, and intended to use only the threat of such a conflict as a diversionary tactic.

However, the Russo-Japanese War is also in example of how a diversionary war can backfire. Japan soundly defeated Russia in battle. This only aggravated the calls for replacing the Tsar, loosened his grip on power, and some say hastened the path toward the Russian Revolutions of 1905 and 1917.

=== Post-World War II ===
Many contemporary examples involve the U.S. because they fit the mold of conditions, a democratic superpower. The examples follow a similar model in which the U.S. must decide whether or not to intervene in an international conflict. Because the U.S. is in a good position to win most military conflicts, it will most likely increase the current administration's chance of reelection if they engage in military conflict.

==== Falklands War ====
It has been alleged that the National Reorganization Process, the ruling military government of Argentina, started the Falklands War (1982) to divert public attention from the country's chronic economic problems and the regime's ongoing human rights violations of the Dirty War. Numerous studies dispute that the Argentinian leadership was motivated by diversionary theory.

==== Senkaku/Diaoyu Islands Dispute ====
It has been argued that the sovereignty dispute over the contested Senkaku Island chain between Japan and China exhibits diversionary characteristics. The dispute often remains dormant for long periods of time, only to be punctuated by brief but intense spikes of diplomatic action and mobilization. A 2024 study has linked these escalations to attempts to divert attention away from negative domestic events, pointing to unrestrained Anti-Japanese fervor over 2010 Senkaku boat collision incident and the 2012 Wang Lijun incident which implicated Politburo member Bo Xilai in a corruption scandal as well as unrest within the Chinese Communist Party at the time.

==== Russia's invasion of Crimea ====
A 2017 study in the journal Security Studies found that Russia's seizure of Crimea in early 2014 "increased national pride among Russians while support for President Vladimir Putin rose dramatically, and they suggest that the two processes were causally linked."

==== Twelve-Day War ====
Some analysts noted the timing of the 2025 Israeli strikes on Iran with an ongoing motion of no confidence against the government of Israeli Prime Minister Benjamin Netanyahu. According to the Times of Israel, Netanyahu has also considered holding a snap election in light of rising popular support as a result of the war; his lawyer requested a delay of his corruption trial due to "diplomatic, national and security issues", which was later rejected by a Jerusalem court.

== Impact on international relation approaches ==
=== Challenges to realism and liberalism ===
The focus of the Diversionary War theory on individual state actors and their domestic situations as causes for war challenges the basis of major approaches to International Relations. Many of these International Relation theories used by scholars, such as liberalism and realism, focus on states as the main actors in the international system. Technically, this is referred to as using the interstate level of analysis. These scholars attribute the motives and actions of states to the states themselves, instead of the decision makers inside their governments.

On the other hand, the use of diversionary foreign policy suggests that factors inside a state, such as domestic disputes and economic lows, have as much of an impact on foreign policy as on national interests. As a result, examinations of the use of diversionary wars shift the study of International Relations away from the interstate level of analysis, toward the domestic level of analysis, and even the individual level of analysis. In fact, many critics of the realism use of examples of the use of diversionary wars as a means to discredit the theory. However, modern approaches to realism, such as neoclassical realism, regard domestic politics as a crucial variable in foreign policy. This means the diversionary foreign policy thesis does in fact fit within the neoclassical realist framework.

== Criticism and problems with the theory ==
As with most theories there are disagreements among experts regarding diversionary wars. Diversionary foreign policy is supported by anecdotal evidence because it is hard to prove a theory in international relations quantitatively. When quantitative or empirical tests are attempted, the results are fairly ambiguous and there is not enough consistency among various findings to establish a definitive conclusion. This creates a discrepancy between the theoretical and historical text and the empirical evidence. Therefore, a good amount of criticism arises.

To begin with, there is an opposing theory that argues a state leader has the most leverage when citizens are content with domestic policy and the leader has high public approval ratings. It is then assumed that leaders are most likely to engage in international conflicts when the domestic approval is highest. Furthermore, some analysts argue that the entire basis for the argument, the idea that a foreign enemy brings a country together, is not as well founded as it originally seems. This idea relies heavily on sociological studies that focus on the cohesion of small groups. Problems arise when theorists try to apply this to a large group such as a nation state, which is composed of many smaller groups. In fact, there are examples of external conflict leading to more unrest between domestic groups. For example, World War I led to internal problems in Russia, eventually culminating in the Bolshevik Revolution. Some also argue that a government cannot just incite an international conflict whenever they wish. Although there are always conflicts going on among the international community, not all are compelling enough to justify the use of force to the public and the government may even be accused of overreacting to a situation.

== See also ==
- Credibility gap
- Realpolitik
