= Chris Rabb =

American politician (born 1970)

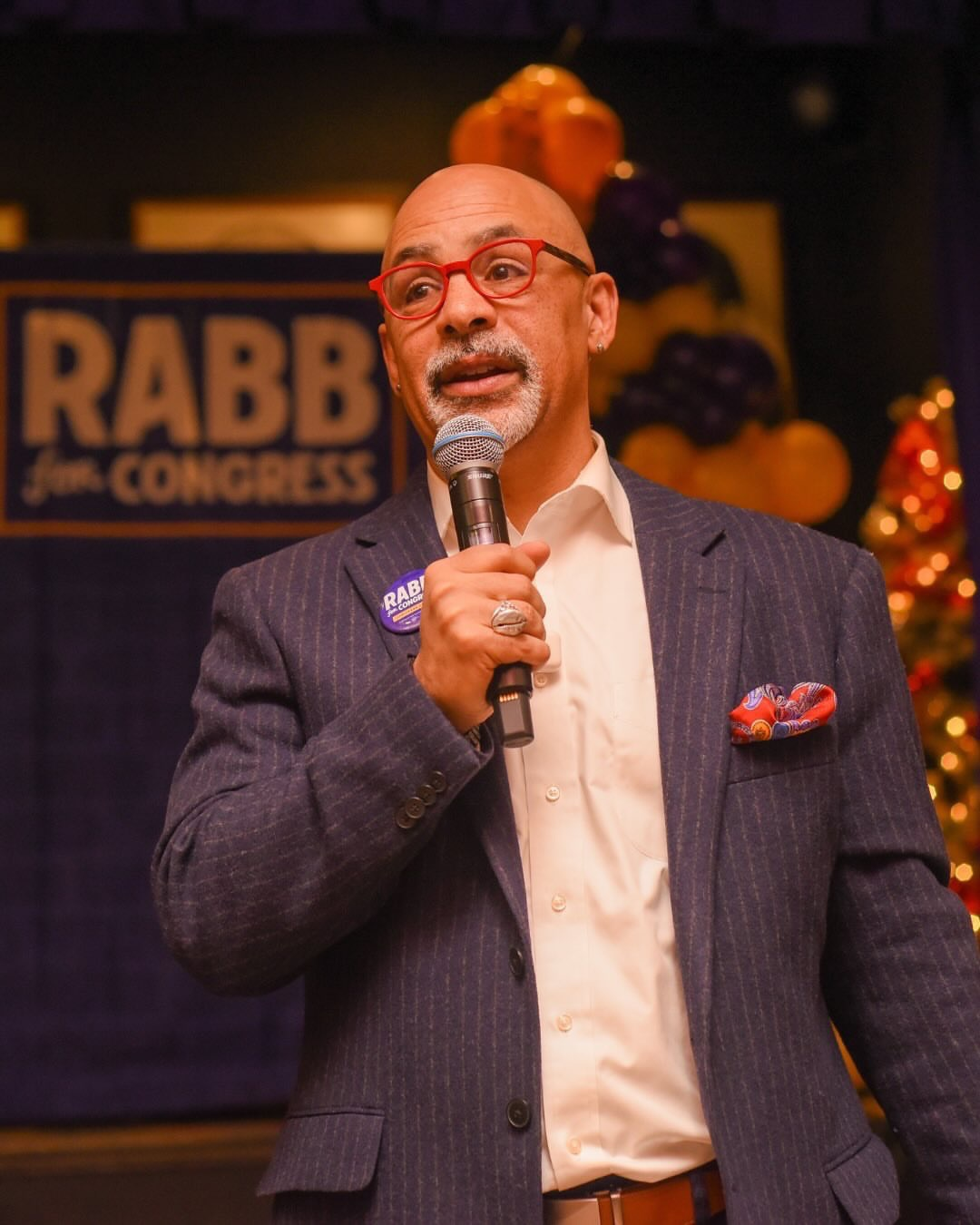
- Rabb in December 2025

Member-elect of the U.S. House of Representatives from Pennsylvania's 3rd district
- Assuming office January 3, 2027
- Succeeding: Dwight Evans

Member of the Pennsylvania House of Representatives from the 200th district
- Incumbent
- Assumed office January 3, 2017
- Preceded by: Tonyelle Cook-Artis

Personal details
- Born: Christopher Murphy Rabb; February 21, 1970 (age 56) Chicago, Illinois, U.S.
- Party: Democratic
- Other political affiliations: Working Families; Democratic Socialists of America
- Spouse: Imani Perry (divorced)
- Children: 2
- Relatives: Maurice Rabb Jr. (father); Billy Murphy Jr. (uncle); Laura W. Murphy (aunt); Madeline Wheeler Murphy (grandmother); John H. Murphy Sr. (great-great-grandfather)
- Education: Yale University (BA); University of Pennsylvania (MS)
- Website: Campaign website

Christopher Murphy Rabb (born February 21, 1970) is an American politician who is the U.S. representative-elect for Pennsylvania's 3rd congressional district. A member of the Democratic Party and the Democratic Socialists of America, he has represented the 200th district in the Pennsylvania House of Representatives since 2017.

== Early life, family, and education ==
Rabb in the St. Ignatius College Prep yearbook, 1988

Rabb was born in Chicago to Maurice Rabb Jr., an ophthalmologist and professor, and Madeline Murphy Rabb. His maternal grandmother, Madeline Wheeler Murphy, was a Baltimore-based community activist, and his maternal grandfather, William H. Murphy Sr., was a judge in Baltimore. Rabb's great-great-grandfather, John H. Murphy Sr., was born into slavery and founded the Baltimore Afro-American in 1892. Other ancestors of his include the Founding Fathers, Robert R. Livingston, Philip Livingston and William Livingston, of the Scottish-Dutch Livingston family.

Shortly after beginning his undergraduate education at Yale University in 1988, Rabb was instrumental in the removal of an image of a shackled slave from the common room of Calhoun College (named after alumnus John C. Calhoun, since renamed after alumna Grace Hopper). In the process Rabb also learned he was a descendant of Philip Livingston. Rabb received his bachelor's degree from Yale in 1992. Rabb received a master's degree in organizational dynamics from the University of Pennsylvania in 2006.

== Career ==
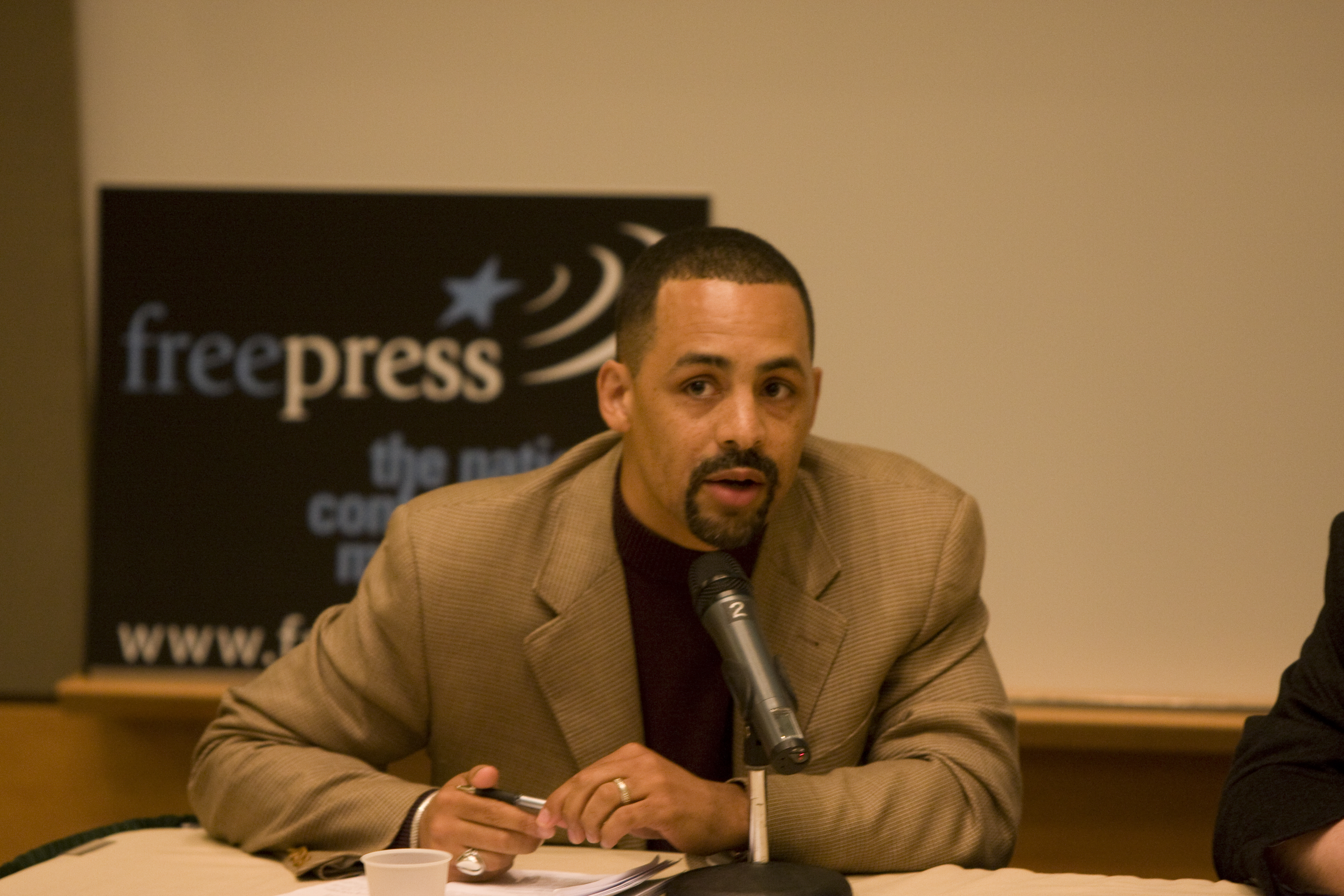
Rabb at the National Conference for Media Reform, June 7, 2008

In the early 1990s, Rabb worked as an aide to U.S. Senator Carol Moseley Braun. He then worked for the Clinton administration in the 1995 White House Conference on Small Business. Since moving to Philadelphia to obtain his master's at Penn, he has taught a business course at Temple University. He published the non-fiction book Invisible Capital: How Unseen Forces Shape Entrepreneurial Opportunity in 2010.

=== Pennsylvania House of Representatives ===
In 2016, Rabb defeated the incumbent state representative Tonyelle Cook-Artis, who was supported by the Pennsylvania Democratic establishment, in a three-way Democratic primary 47% to 40%, and then defeated Republican challenger Latryse McDowell 94% to 5% in the November general election. He won the 2018 primary over establishment-backed challenger Melissa Scott 52% to 48%, and has since run unopposed in 2020 and 2024.

Rabb has been a member of the Pennsylvania House of Representatives, representing the 200th District, since 2017. Rabb serves on a number of House Committees, including Agriculture & Rural Affairs, Commerce, and the Judiciary. Rabb has put forward bills that would enable courts in the Commonwealth of Pennsylvania to use restorative justice approaches to sentencing offenders, and introduced and passed bills in the Pennsylvania House to repeal the use of the death penalty (House Bill 999).

In 2017, Rabb helped to found the Pennsylvania Climate Caucus. In 2024, Rabb introduced legislation to counter greenwashing, which is deceptive marketing that incorrectly suggests that a product is beneficial to the environment. According to the Center for Climate Integrity, the bill is the first of its type in the nation.

On October 2, 2021, Rabb authored a memo to all members of the Pennsylvania House of Representatives indicating that he will be introducing legislation to enforce reproductive responsibility among men. According to the memo, the proposal would "require all inseminators to undergo vasectomies within six weeks from having their third child or 40th birthday, whichever comes first." Rabb's satirical memo was intended to draw attention to the double-standard of regulating women's bodies via legislation while the equivalent bill affecting men would seem absurd. Rabb called the memo "parody legislation".

In 2023, Rabb introduced bills to allow independent voters to vote in Pennsylvania primary elections (HB 979) and to provide protections for cannabis consumers and businesses.

=== 2026 U.S. House of Representatives election ===
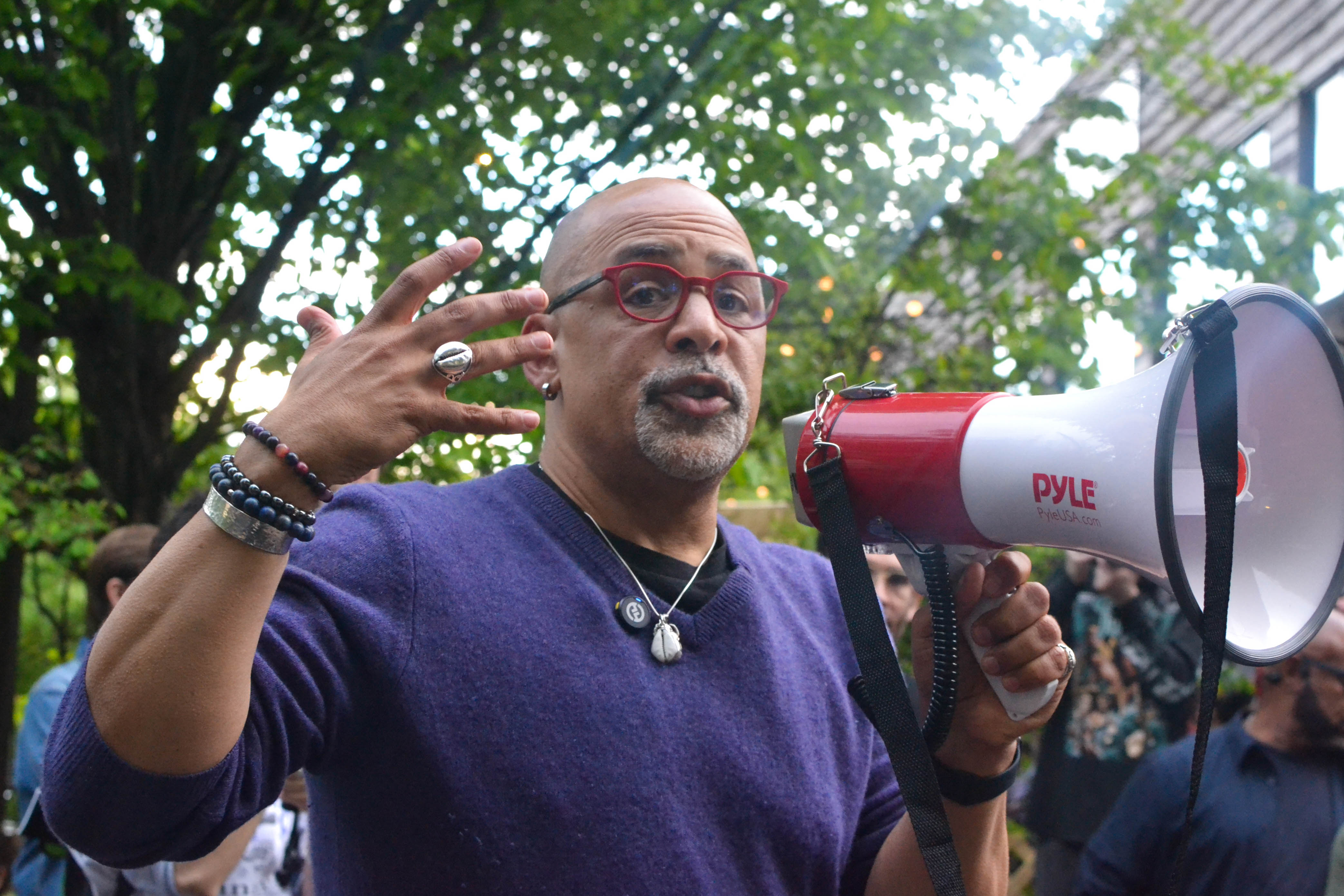
Rabb at a campaign rally in 2026

2026 Democratic primary results Rabb: 30–40%; 40–50%; 50–60%; 60–70%; 70–80%; 80–90%; Street: 30–40%; 40–50%; 50–60%; 60–70%; 70–80%; 80–90%; 90–100%; Stanford: 30–40%; 40–50%; 50–60%; 60–70%; Tie: 30–40%; 40–50%

In 2025, Rabb entered the Democratic primary for Pennsylvania's 3rd congressional district to succeed Congressman Dwight Evans after he announced his retirement. Rabb was endorsed by numerous progressive organizations and politicians, including the Justice Democrats, Sunrise Movement, Democratic Socialists of America (both the Philadelphia branch and the national organization), Congresswoman Alexandria Ocasio-Cortez, and the Working Families Party. He joined the Democratic Socialists of America in 2026, but stated in an interview with Jacobin that he has identified as a democratic socialist for longer. American Priorities, a pro-Palestine super PAC created to counter the influence of the pro-Israel AIPAC, spent more than $400,000 in support of Rabb. Rabb accused Ala Stanford, one of his opponents, of receiving support from AIPAC, which both Stanford and AIPAC denied. His candidacy was described as an example of a "Mamdanified" campaign.

In December, Rabb's campaign Instagram account reposted a video promoting a theory that the 2025 Bondi Beach shooting was perpetrated by "Zionists", which Rabb later disavowed and criticised, saying a former staffer was responsible for the repost.

Rabb won the Democratic primary on May 19, 2026, defeating his opponents Sharif Street, Ala Stanford, and Shaun Griffith with 44% of the vote. He is running against independent candidate Dennis Mahoney in the general election.

In September 2026, Rabb attended a protest ahead of a speech by Israeli prime minister Benjamin Netanyahu at the United Nations General Assembly.

== Personal life ==
Rabb has two sons and lives in East Mount Airy. He is divorced from the scholar Imani Perry. Rabb identifies as nonreligious and was endorsed by the American Humanist Association.

== Awards ==
- 2019, Rising Environmental Leader award, The National Caucus of Environmental Legislators (NCEL)

== Published works ==
- Invisible Capital: How Unseen Forces Shape Entrepreneurial Opportunity (2010) ISBN 9781605093079

== Electoral history ==
=== 2016 ===
2016 Pennsylvania House of Representatives, 200th district
Primary election
Party	Candidate	Votes	%
Democratic	Chris Rabb	10,299	47.23
Democratic	Tonyelle Cook-Artis (incumbent)	8,866	40.66
Democratic	Bobbie Curry	2,640	12.11
Total votes		21,805	100.0
General election
Democratic	Christopher M. Rabb	34,012	94.56
Republican	Kionna West	1,958	5.44
Total votes		35,970	100.00
Democratic hold			

=== 2018 ===
2018 Pennsylvania House of Representatives, 200th district
Primary election
Party	Candidate	Votes	%
Democratic	Chris Rabb (incumbent)	7,954	52.3
Democratic	Melissa Scott	7,249	47.7
Total votes		15,203	100.0
General election
Democratic	Christopher M. Rabb (incumbent)	32,558	100.00
Total votes		32,558	100.00
Democratic hold			

=== 2020 ===
2020 Pennsylvania House of Representatives, 200th district
Primary election
Party	Candidate	Votes	%
Democratic	Chris Rabb (incumbent)	21,579	99.77
Write-in		49	0.23
Total votes		21,628	100.0
General election
Democratic	Christopher M. Rabb (incumbent)	36,437	100.00
Total votes		36,437	100.00
Democratic hold			

=== 2022 ===
2022 Pennsylvania House of Representatives, 200th district
Primary election
Party	Candidate	Votes	%
Democratic	Chris Rabb (incumbent)	11,554	62.67
Democratic	Isabella Fitzgerald	6,854	37.18
Write-in		27	0.15
Total votes		18,435	100.0
General election
Democratic	Christopher M. Rabb (incumbent)	29,663	96.06
Republican	Kionna West	1,216	3.94
Total votes		30,879	100.00
Democratic hold			

=== 2024 ===
2024 Pennsylvania House of Representatives, 200th district
Primary election
Party	Candidate	Votes	%
Democratic	Chris Rabb (incumbent)	15,138	99.6
Write-in		56	0.4
Total votes		15,194	100.0
General election
Democratic	Christopher M. Rabb (incumbent)	35,743	99.6
Write-in		140	0.4
Total votes		35,883	100.0
Democratic hold			

=== 2026 ===
2026 Pennsylvania's 3rd congressional district election
Primary election
Party	Candidate	Votes	%
Democratic	Chris Rabb	65,782	44.6
Democratic	Sharif Street	43,137	29.3
Democratic	Ala Stanford	35,452	24.0
Democratic	Shaun Griffith	3,042	2.1
Total votes		147,413	100.0

U.S. House of Representatives
Preceded by Dwight Evans	Member of the U.S. House of Representatives from Pennsylvania's 3rd congressional district Taking office 2027	Elect
