= Ala Stanford =

American pediatric surgeon

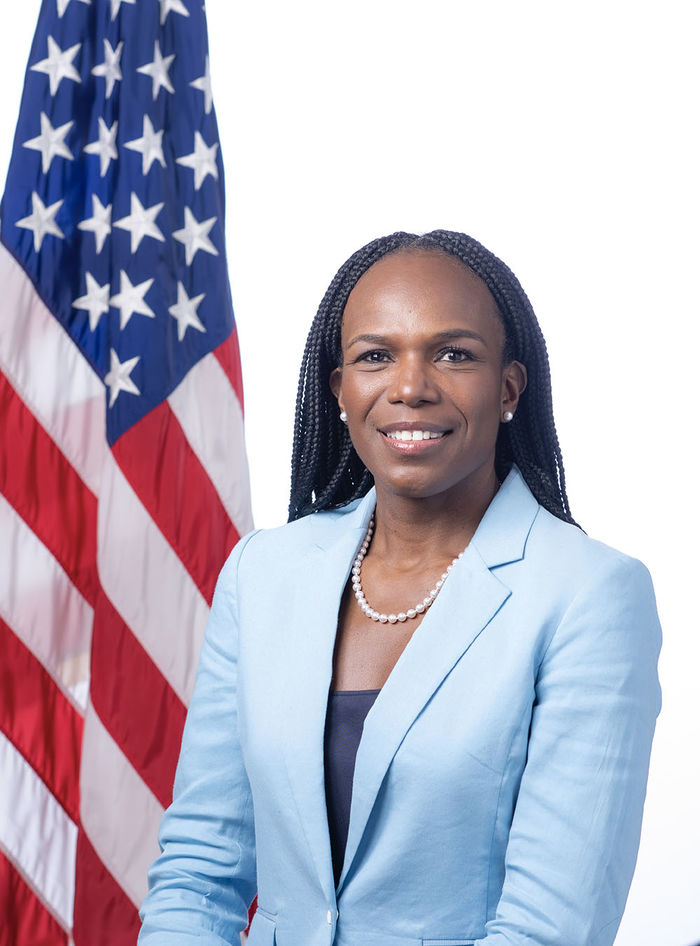
- Official portrait, 2022

Personal details
- Born: December 1970 (age 55) Philadelphia, Pennsylvania, U.S.
- Party: Democratic
- Spouse: Byron Drayton (m. 2019)
- Education: Pennsylvania State University, University Park (BS); Pennsylvania State University, Hershey (MD)

Ala Stanford (born December 1970) is an American pediatric surgeon. She holds certifications in both adult general-surgery and pediatric surgery. She founded Philadelphia's Black Doctors COVID-19 Consortium. What began as free COVID-19 testing, funded by Stanford herself, reaching nearly 400 patients each day, developed into a step towards restructuring our healthcare system to the benefit of those facing inequality in regards to receiving care. Dr. Stanford gained international recognition during the COVID-19 pandemic using the infrastructure of her pediatric surgery practice to create a grassroots organization focused on education, testing, contact tracing and vaccination in communities devoid of access to care and resources. The consortium was created during the COVID-19 pandemic to address barriers to testing in Philadelphia communities that had been disporportionatley affected by the virus. "Dr. Ala Stanford". Penn State Behrend. She is also the first African-American female pediatric surgeon to be trained entirely in the United States. In 2024, Stanford joined the University of Pennsylvania as a professor of practice in the Department of Biology, and as director of Community Outreach for research activities in the Penn Institute for RNA Innovation.

Stanford was a candidate for the Democratic nomination for Pennsylvania's 3rd congressional district in the 2026 election, having been endorsed by retiring incumbent Dwight Evans. She was defeated by state representative Chris Rabb in the primary.

Stanford currently serves as a U.S. Department of Health and Human Services' regional director, providing services to six states.

== Early life and education ==
Stanford was born in Germantown, Philadelphia. Her mother was 14 years old when she was born and her father left for college a few years after she was born. Her mother worked hard to make ends meet and often left Ala to take care of herself and her younger brother. It was this experience that is said to have inspired her career. Following high school, Stanford enrolled at Pennsylvania State University for her undergraduate degree and medical degree. Upon graduating from the Penn State University College of Medicine, Stanford finished her residency at SUNY Downstate Medical Center and the University of Pittsburgh Medical Center. Stanford subsequently became the first African-American female pediatric surgeon to be trained entirely in the United States.

== Medical career ==
Following her fellowship at the Cincinnati Children's Hospital Medical Center, Stanford joined the faculty at Temple University in September 2006. A year later, she became director of the Center for Minority Health and Health Disparities at Temple University School of Medicine, where she partnered with the Allegheny West Foundation. In 2008, Stanford was recognized with the Shirley Chisholm Award from the Philadelphia Congress of the National Congress of Black Women. She eventually left Temple University to become the director of pediatric surgery at Abington Memorial Hospital. While there in 2010, she performed life-saving surgery on a baby from Haiti. Stanford also established Stanford Pediatric Surgery, LLC. Over the course of her career, Stanford has been an attending pediatric surgeon at several hospitals including St. Christopher's Hospital for Children, The Children's Hospital of Philadelphia, Cooper University Hospital, and Saint Peter's University Hospital for Children.

During the start of the COVID-19 pandemic, Stanford recognized racism in medicine amongst the distribution of vaccines. She left her role as a pediatric surgeon to work full time to address health disparities in Black communities during the pandemic. This led to the establishment of the Black Doctors COVID-19 Consortium (BDCC), which combined a group of around 200 healthcare professionals. Between April 2020 and October 2021, the Black Doctors COVID-19 Consortium tested more than 25,000 people for COVID-19 and vaccinated more than 75,000 Philadelphians. She was also honored by the Philadelphia Flyers who teamed up with the BDCC. In 2021, Stanford was named to Fortune Magazine's 50 Greatest Leaders (number 23) of the year and and in 2021 was recognized as a Top 10 CNN Hero. She also created a program for individuals to be able to take COVID-19 tests for free in convenient location, including churches, parking lots, and mosques. Stanford and the Black Doctors Consortium also organized a free health screening event for Muslim women and children in Philadelphia. The event was planned in partnership with the Majlis Ash-Shura of the Delaware Valley and aimed to provide healthcare from female physicians for women who face barriers to receiving medical care.

In October 2021, Stanford opened the Ala Stanford Center for Health Equity, which offers primary care and behavioral health services to adults and children. Later that month, she removed her name from consideration to be Philadelphia's next health commissioner. She then served as director of region three at the United States Department of Health and Human Services from 2021 to 2024. In 2024, Stanford joined the University of Pennsylvania as a professor of practice in the Department of Biology, and as director of Community Outreach for research activities in the Penn Institute for RNA Innovation. She then became a research associate at the Annenberg School for Communication, this work includes research on health and communication. She was also the recipient of an honorary degree from Haverford College. On August 6 of 2024, Stanford released her own book titled "Take Care of Them Like My Own", where she shares her story of overcoming hurdles along her journey and highlights the racial disparities in today's healthcare system. She also co-authored numerous articles discussing surgical techniques, conditions, and research findings. These articles include "A citywide experiment testing the impact of geographically targeted, high-pay-off vaccine lotteries" and " The surgical management of short bowel syndrome." In April 2026, Stanford and the BDCC also funded the construction of an imaging center, with the help of Ala Stanford Center for Health Equity. The facility is in North Philadelphia and includes an array of imaging services like x-ray and mammography.

A 2026 review of tax documents by the Philadelphia Inquirer found that the Black Doctors Consortium failed to accurately report Stanford's salary for multiple years, totaling $962,000. The nonprofit's lawyer claimed that it was an "inadvertent omission", and that they are working to correct it with the Internal Revenue Service. In 2024, Stanford drew a salary of at least $400,000, paid for by the city of Philadelphia.

== Political career ==
Stanford declared her candidacy for the Democratic nomination for Pennsylvania's 3rd congressional district in the 2026 election on October 1, 2025. She immediately received the endorsement of the seat's retiring incumbent, Dwight Evans.

Her campaign was found to have used generative AI when responding to a candidate questionnaire in April 2026. Kellan R. White, a senior adviser to Stanford who edited the questionnaire, claimed that they only used Claude to edit for brevity.

Following Stanford's involvement in COVID-19, she is now actively advocating for immigrant communities impacted by ICE.

In March 2026, Stanford said of the Gaza genocide, "I know when you use the G-word how hurtful it is to a group of people. It's like someone saying the N-word around me. I don't want to hear that. And every time you shout that from the rooftops, how many people are you hurting?" In April, she doubled down on her statement, saying, "For Israelis who've been accused of committing [genocide], it's hurtful for them."

Stanford has denied taking campaign contributions from AIPAC, a pro-Israel lobby group, but reporting by Ryan Grim of Drop Site News detailed that the organization has supported her with funds routed through 314 Action, a super PAC. 314 Action has spent a total of $2.6 million on Stanford's campaign as of April 21, 2026. Although the exact amount originating from AIPAC will not be known until future campaign finance disclosures, $500,000 has already been linked to a known AIPAC shell organization. On April 29, Stanford withdrew from a debate hosted by WHYY-FM hours before it was scheduled to begin.

In May, 314 Action was reported to have pulled TV ads in support of Stanford. According to two anonymous sources who spoke to The Philadelphia Inquirer, the decision was made after the organization commissioned a poll showing that Stanford's support among voters had declined significantly following "a series of campaign missteps". In a poll taken from April 30 to May 2, 39% of respondents named Israel or AIPAC as a negative association with Stanford, and 38% identified Stanford as the AIPAC-supported candidate.

On May 19, Stanford lost the primary to state representative Chris Rabb, a political progressive considered to be running to Stanford's left. She finished third in the primary, behind Rabb and state senator Sharif Street; both Rabb and Street criticized Stanford for her association with AIPAC.

== Awards and honors ==
- Surgical Infection Society Trailblazer Award in 2024
- Pennsylvania State University Distinguished Alumni Award in 2024
- Honorary Degree from Haverford College in 2024
- The Philadelphia Award in 2021
- The Harris Wofford Active Citizenship Award in 2021
- One of USA Today's Women of the Year for 2022
- Top 10 CNN Hero of 2021
- Kyoshi Kuromiya Award at the HIV Education Summit in 2025

== Personal life ==
Stanford married Byron Drayton on March 30th, 2019. The couple have five sons and one daughter from previous marriages, the oldest born in 1984 or 1985 and the youngest in 2009 or 2010.
