= Nuria Fernandez =

Nuria Fernandez may refer to:

- Nuria I. Fernandez (born 1959), a United States transit official born in Panama
- Nuria Fernández Domínguez (born 1976), a Spanish middle-distance runner
- Nuria Fernández Gómez (born 1979), better known as Nuria Fergó or simply Fergó, a Spanish actress and singer
