= Mamdanification =

US Democratic Party campaign style

In United States politics, Mamdanification is a neologism describing a shift in style, behavior, and policy within Democratic Party campaigns that is characterized by a fusion of anti-establishment rhetoric, high-engagement social media usage, and unabashed left-wing populism. The term was coined by political commentator Jack Stanton in an article for The Orlando Times discussing the rise of "visual populism." The term is derived from Zohran Mamdani, the 112th Mayor of New York City, whose election in 2025 was widely viewed as a "watershed moment" for the American Left.

Some interpretations of the trend suggest it represents a broader shift in Democratic Party politics, including as a manifestation of "generational change."

== Background ==
The concept emerged following the 2025 New York City Democratic mayoral primary. Zohran Mamdani, a democratic socialist and former state assemblyman, defeated several established candidates, including former Governor Andrew Cuomo. Political analysts noted Mamdani's campaign successfully neutralized the significant financial advantage of his opponents through organic social media engagement and a distinctive aesthetic, specifically his Bollywood-inspired campaign logo.

Logo of Zohran Mamdani's campaign for mayor of New York City in 2025

== Definition ==
Mamdanification identifies a departure from traditional "institutional" campaigning in favor of a "human" brand that prioritizes "perceived authenticity" and direct digital engagement over credentials. More broadly, Mamdanification is interpreted as a manifestation of a "generational change" within the Democratic Party. It represents the rise of candidates who view social media as the primary medium for building a direct bond with the electorate. This style is typically used to bypass traditional media and party infrastructure.

The replication of Mamdanified campaigns is most notably seen through the typography and color palettes of the campaign logo. Emulators have adopted nearly identical font structures and graphic layouts, such as Nithya Raman's logo in the 2026 Los Angeles mayoral election. Chris Rabb has also been described as a "Mamdanified" candidate.

== Analysis and criticism ==
Political analysts have observed that changes in social media usage and style alone are insufficient for victory. Following his primary defeat, Andrew Cuomo attempted a "brand overhaul" to match Mamdani's digital presence. The New York Times described the effort as "noteworthy shift" trying to "match Mamdani". Within the Democratic Party, the trend has triggered some concern; moderate Democrats fear the uncompromising rhetoric, particularly regarding Israel, might alienate swing voters in "purple" districts despite its effectiveness in deep-blue urban centers. Some experts predict the trend will lead to more Millennial and Gen Z candidates running for elected office. Since August 2026, the term has been used by political organizers to rally young voters through Mamdani-themed voter guides.

== See also ==
- Vibecession
- Dead cat strategy
- Ming vase strategy
