= Butterfly on a Wheel (song) =

1990 studio single by The Mission

Single by the Mission

from the album Carved in Sand
- B-side: "The Grip of Disease"
- Released: 2 January 1990
- Recorded: 1989
- Studio: Jacobs (Farnham, Surrey, England)
- Genre: Gothic rock
- Length: 5:44
- Label: Mercury; Phonogram
- Songwriters: Craig Adams; Mick Brown; Simon Hinkler; Wayne Hussey
- Producer: Tim Palmer

The Mission singles chronology
"Beyond the Pale" (1988)	"Butterfly on a Wheel" (1990)	"Deliverance" (1990)

"Butterfly on a Wheel" is a song released by English gothic rock band the Mission in January 1990. It was the first of three singles to be released from their third studio album, Carved in Sand (1990). It peaked at No. 12 on the UK Singles Chart and reached the top 50 in Ireland, the Netherlands, and New Zealand, as well as on the US Billboard Modern Rock Tracks chart, where it reached number 23.

== Background ==
The song was recorded along with 17 others for the Carved in Sand sessions at Jacobs Studios in 1989. The overriding theme in the song was the break up of a romance and the lyrics telling the person that they would be healed in time. Many have stated that the song was written about Julianne Regan, the singer with All About Eve, who had recently broken up with The Mission's guitarist, Simon Hinkler. This was later confirmed by Hussey himself in the liner notes for their Anthology compilation album released in 2006 by Phonogram.

The name was taken from a 1960s editorial by William Rees-Mogg who questioned the severity of the prison sentences applied to members of The Rolling Stones for minor drug offences.

Released on New Year's Day 1990, the song peaked at No. 12 in the UK charts and stayed in the top 40 for four weeks. It was released on vinyl (7-inch, 10-inch, and 12-inch extended play) and on a compact disc single. Its B-side is "The Grip of Disease", with extended versions also offering remixes of Kingdom Come (from the 1988 album "Children)" and Butterfly on a Wheel.

== Critical reception ==
The Orlando Times described the song as a "poor imitation of Simple Minds, fraught with such spiritual observations". They also awarded the album it was culled from one star out of five. Conversely, the Orange County Register stated that "both Butterfly on a Wheel and Sea of Love (the fourth track from Carved in Sand) show what The Mission UK can do if they cut down on the bombast".

The track was also described as being a vehicle to "show off [Wayne] Hussey's offbeat romanticism". The South Wales Echo said that "The Mish have really outdone themselves this time, dumping their goth mish mash for a truly wonderful song, swathed in iridescent melody."

== Personnel ==
- Craig Adams – bass guitar
- Mick Brown – drums
- Simon Hinkler – guitar, keyboards
- Wayne Hussey – vocals, guitar

== Charts ==
Chart (1990)	Peak position
Europe (Eurochart Hot 100)	29
Ireland (IRMA)	13
Netherlands (Single Top 100)	48
New Zealand (Recorded Music NZ)	36
UK Singles (OCC)	12
US Modern Rock Tracks (Billboard)	23
