= Dwight Evans =

Dwight Evans may refer to:

- Dwight Evans (baseball) (born 1951), American former baseball player
- Dwight Evans (politician) (born 1954), American politician
