= Isabella Fitzgerald =

American politician

Member of the Pennsylvania House of Representatives from the 203rd district
- In office January 3, 2017 – January 3, 2023
- Preceded by: Dwight Evans
- Succeeded by: Anthony A. Bellmon

Personal details
- Born: December 9, 1949 Philadelphia, Pennsylvania, U.S.
- Died: December 6, 2024 (aged 74) Philadelphia, Pennsylvania, U.S.
- Party: Democratic

Isabella Fitzgerald (December 9, 1949 – December 6, 2024) was an American politician who served in the Pennsylvania House of Representatives from the 203rd district from 2017 to 2023.

== Biography ==
Born on December 9, 1949, in Philadelphia, Pennsylvania, Fitzgerald graduated from Overbrook High School in 1967, and subsequently attended LaSalle University and Temple University. She earned her Associate of Arts degree in marketing management from the Community College of Philadelphia in 1984.

Employed as a special assistant to U.S. Congressman Robert A. Brady from 1998 to 2002, she then worked as a legislative assistant to Pennsylvania State Representative Dwight Evans from 2002 to 2014.

Appointed as leader of the 10th Ward Democratic Committee, she was subsequently elected as a Democrat to the Pennsylvania House of Representatives and represented her constituents during the 2017, 2019 and 2021 terms. In the 2022 election she was redistricted from the 203rd into the 200th district, forcing her to run against its incumbent representative Chris Rabb and was defeated in the primary.

She died December 6, 2024.
