= Shaw Mudge =

American Entrepreneur (1923 - 2001)

- Born: 1923; New York City, United States
- Died: 2001 (aged 77–78); Greenwich, Connecticut
- Occupations: Entrepreneur and activist
- Known for: Promotion of the Connecticut small business community
- Spouse: Patricia Grant (m. 1951)
- Children: 2

Shaw Mudge (born New York, New York State, 1923; died Greenwich, Connecticut, 2001) was an entrepreneur and activist prominent in the Connecticut small business community.

== Early life ==
Mudge was born in New York City and raised in Mamaroneck, New York. He attended elementary schools in Mamaroneck followed by secondary school at The Choate School in Wallingford, Connecticut. During World War II, Mudge attended the United States Navy's Officer Candidate School and served as in small boat operations in the Caribbean and South Pacific as a Lieutenant JG.

Mudge attended Yale University where he graduated in 1944 with a major in International Relations, followed by a semester at the University of Colorado graduate business school.

== Early career ==
Mudge began his business career working for his step-father, Arthur Mudge, at the Tri-Mer Chemical Company. There he worked in research and development creating aromatic compounds. After the end of World War II, Mudge traveled to France to work with French perfume manufacturer P. Robertet, later returning to the United States to co-found and head up P. Robertet's US division and to co-found its Argentine division.

Mudge went on to found a series of companies related to the fragrances industry, including Elan Chemical Company and Taconic Natural Oils Company. Finally, in January 1969, Mudge co-founded Shaw Mudge & Company. The company grew and by 1977, had moved to a larger facility in Stamford, Connecticut, and had purchased aircraft to meet its sales needs. This led to the formation of a wholly owned subsidiary: Columbia Air Services, in 1977. In the 1990s the company moved to larger facilities in Shelton, Connecticut. Over the years, Mudge started a number of small businesses, including Habitant Trading Corporation and Shaw Mudge Manufacturing Singapore. In 1981 he became Connecticut Small Businessman of the Year.

== Small business activism ==
Mudge was the chairman of the Connecticut delegation to the first White House Conference on Small Business in 1980 as Connecticut's chairman, appointed by Senator Lowell Weicker. He later served as co-chairman of the Connecticut delegation to the second White House Conference on Small Business in 1985, again at the appointment of Senator Weicker; and the third White House Conference on Small Business. Along the way he chaired the U.S. Senate Small Business Committee Advisory Council (1981–1987), served on the National Advisory Council of the U.S. Small Business Administration, was a founding director of National Small Business United, a Connecticut Guardian of National Federation of Independent Businesses from 1986 to at least 1994, served on the Council on Small Business - Chamber of Commerce of the U. S. from 1981 to 1983 (Washington, D.C.), and served in several other capacities.

== Personal ==
Mudge married Patricia Grant in January 1951. Their younger child, Grant, was born in 1956.

Mudge was a noted conservationist, involving himself in legislation to protect wolves and grizzly bears.

== Special recognitions ==
- Connecticut Small Business Man of the Year, 1981
- Greenwich Chamber of Commerce Small Business Man of the Year (Connecticut)
- Greenwich Harpoon Fall Guy 1980
- The Society of Cosmetic Chemists (SCC) Merit Award 1970
- State of Connecticut General Assembly Official Citation in recognition of being re-elected Chairman of the Connecticut Delegation of the White House Conference on Small Business - presented March 5, 1981
- Letter of recognition of perseverance and work contributed to the Regulatory Flexibility Act of 1980 - President Jimmy Carter, March, 1980
- Official Expression of sentiment by members of the Senate & House of Representatives given May 19, 1981 - Augusta, Maine
- SACIA's (Southwestern Area Commerce & Industry Association of Connecticut, Inc.) first Small Business Advocate of the Year, May, 1985 (Stamford, Connecticut)
- Animal Protection Institute Certificate of Appreciation, Sacramento (California); for efforts to keep the wolf and grizzly bear on The Endangered Species list - May, 1985
- National Small Business United (NSBU) Appreciation Plaque - February, 1990
- Connecticut District Export Council - Distinguished Service Plaque - 1991–1995

== Legacy ==
Mudge is survived by his two sons and their spouses, and five grandchildren. He is memorialized by the Society of Cosmetic Chemists in their Shaw Mudge Award. He was the brother to Roderic Frazer McCabe who predeceased him in 1973.
