= John F. White Jr. =

American politician

Member of the Philadelphia City Council from the 9th District
- In office December 1981 – January 8, 1987
- Preceded by: Louis Johanson
- Succeeded by: Marian Tasco

Member of the Pennsylvania House of Representatives from the 200th district
- In office January 4, 1977 – November 13, 1981
- Preceded by: Rose Toll
- Succeeded by: Gordon Linton

Personal details
- Born: March 25, 1949 (age 77) Philadelphia, Pennsylvania, U.S.
- Party: Democratic

John F. White Jr. (born March 25, 1949) is an American executive and former public servant and politician. White is a former Pennsylvania State Secretary of Welfare, Federal Housing Director, Democratic member of the Pennsylvania House of Representatives and Philadelphia City Councilman.

== Public service career ==
White began his professional career as a community organizer at the Philadelphia Urban League while still in his early twenties.

In 1976, he was elected to the Pennsylvania House of Representatives from the 200th Legislative District. During his three-term tenure, he sponsored several key pieces of legislation, focusing on a range of public policy concerns including education, juvenile justice, prison reform, social welfare, and energy issues. White conducted statewide public hearings and was the prime sponsor of legislation to ban handguns and chart new gun control guidelines. His service led to appointments to the Appropriations, Judiciary and Transportation Committees, where he was chairman of the Sub-Committees on Mass Transit and Crime and Corrections. Joining with the late Representative David P. Richardson, John conducted the first-ever public hearings held in the state prisons themselves, investigating prison conditions, health, and safety issues. He was also elected Co-Chairman of the Philadelphia Delegation to the Pennsylvania House, by his fellow lawmakers.

In 1981, he was elected to the Philadelphia City Council representing the Ninth District. During his six years as a councilman, he chaired the Council's Health and Human Services Committee, where he initiated studies and improvements to upgrade Philadelphia's Department of Human Services. His national research on hospital emergency room improvements paved the way for Philadelphia's initial three state-of-the-art medical trauma centers, the first of their kind, serving both the Philadelphia metro area along with surrounding suburban counties. He also increased foster care placements and established a comprehensive Emergency Utility Fund to assist disadvantaged Philadelphians with heating costs. He also spearheaded increased awareness of Fetal Alcohol Syndrome and sponsored legislation mandating special warnings at all establishments serving or selling alcoholic beverages throughout Philadelphia. White also conducted the first City Council hearings on HIV and AIDS at a time when both public and medical knowledge were very limited and national policy had not yet acknowledged the health and humanitarian crises they posed.

On January 8, 1987, he resigned his City Council seat to accept a position as Secretary of the Pennsylvania Department of Welfare (DPW) by Pennsylvania Governor Robert Casey. DPW was the largest agency in Pennsylvania government at that time, with an $8 billion operating budget and 29,000 employees. White was the first African-American to hold that position. While Secretary, White modernized the statewide mental health system, closing outdated, oversized hospitals and creating the framework for the development of community-based programs. A program he initiated, New Directions for Employment, helped create more than 200,00 jobs for Pennsylvania welfare recipients.

After a brief stint in the private sector, White was appointed by the Clinton Administration in 1993 to serve a four-year term as the executive director of the Philadelphia Housing Authority (PHA). The Philadelphia Housing Authority was the fourth largest housing agency in the nation, serving 44,000 residents, managing 23,000 housing units, with a workforce of 2100 employees, including its own Academy-trained police force. Its annual operating budget was $113 million, with a yearly capital/modernization budget of $80 million, in addition to an unprecedented $500 million capital improvement campaign. The Philadelphia Inquirer commented on White's administration by saying, "Political leaders must forge a consensus that PHA should be allowed to carry out its primary mission – decent, safe housing for poor citizens. That was John White's focus, and it worked."

In both 1984 and 1988, when he was a member of the Policy Committee of the Democratic National Committee (DNC), he worked to develop strategies to guide the DNC presidential selection process and chart new directions promoting multicultural inclusion and diversity.

== Private sector career ==
In 1991, White entered the private sector as a vice president at the New York investment firm of Kidder Peabody in their Pennsylvania and New York City offices. He assisted with publicly financed projects including the Los Angeles transportation system and healthcare institutions around the country.

Since 2001, White has served as president and chief executive officer of The Consortium, a nonprofit Community Mental Health Center (CMHC) in Philadelphia.

== Background ==
Educated in the Philadelphia public schools, he showcased his musical talent which won him a seat playing French horn in the prestigious All City Orchestra. White went on to become an accomplished horn player and was inducted into the Settlement Music School Hall of Fame.

White attended West Chester University, the Fels Institute of Government of the University of Pennsylvania, and the John F. Kennedy School of Government at Harvard University. He is the father of three sons and lives in the Overbrook Farms section of Philadelphia, Pennsylvania.
