= Rose Toll =

American politician

Member of the Pennsylvania House of Representatives from the 200th district
- In office 1971–1976
- Preceded by: Bernard Gross
- Succeeded by: John F. White, Jr.

Personal details
- Born: Rose Ornstein; June 4, 1911 Philadelphia, Pennsylvania
- Died: May 12, 1997 (aged 85) Voorhees, New Jersey
- Party: Democratic
- Spouse: Herman Toll

Rose Toll (June 4, 1911 – May 12, 1997) was a former Democratic member of the Pennsylvania House of Representatives.

She graduated from Kensington High School and Mount Sinai Hospital School of Nursing in 1932.

She served as ward leader of Philadelphia's 50th ward from 1966-1978. Her husband was U.S. Representative Herman Toll.
