= Anthony A. Bellmon =

American politician

Member of the Pennsylvania House of Representatives from the 203rd district
- Incumbent
- Assumed office January 3, 2023
- Preceded by: Isabella Fitzgerald

Personal details
- Born: April 12, 1990 (age 36) Philadelphia, Pennsylvania, U.S.
- Party: Democratic
- Education: George Washington University
- Website: Official website

Anthony A. Bellmon (born April 12, 1990) is a Democratic member of the Pennsylvania House of Representatives, representing the 203rd District since 2023.

For the 2025–2026 Session, Bellmon sits on the following committees:

- Human Services (Secretary)
- Appropriations
- Children & Youth
- Commerce
- Tourism, Recreation & Economic Development
  - Subcommittee on Recreation Chair
- Transportation
  - Subcommittee on Highways Chair

Political offices
Pennsylvania House of Representatives
| Preceded by Isabella Fitzgerald | Member of the Pennsylvania House of Representatives from the 203rd district 2023–present | Incumbent |
