= Tower of Strength =

Tower of Strength may refer to:

- a phrase taken from the Book of Common Prayer of 1549, and later used in

Richard III (Act V, Scene 3) by William Shakespeare

- "Tower of Strength" (Skin song), song on 1994 album Skin by band Skin
- "Tower of Strength" (Gene McDaniels song), 1961 charting single by Gene McDaniels
- "Tower of Strength" (The Mission song), 1988 charting single by The Mission
- "Tower of Strength" (Frankie Vaughan single), 1961 UK Christmas Number One recording (cover of Gene McDaniels song)
