= Federal Transit Administration =

US agency providing financial and technical assistance to public transport operators

Agency overview
- Formed: July 9, 1964; 62 years ago
- Superseding agency: Urban Mass Transportation Administration
- Jurisdiction: United States
- Headquarters: 1200 New Jersey Ave SE Washington, D.C., U.S.
- Agency executives: Vacant, Administrator; Matthew Cahill, Acting Deputy Administrator; Jamie Pfister, Acting Executive Director
- Parent agency: Department of Transportation (USDOT)
- Website: Official website

The Federal Transit Administration (FTA) is an agency within the United States Department of Transportation (DOT) that provides financial and technical assistance to local public transportation systems. The FTA is one of ten modal administrations within the DOT. Headed by an Administrator who is appointed by the president of the United States, the FTA functions through its Washington, D.C., headquarters office and ten regional offices which assist transit agencies in all states, the District of Columbia, and the territories. Until 1991, it was known as the Urban Mass Transportation Administration (UMTA).

Public transportation includes buses, subways, light rail, commuter rail, monorail, passenger ferry boats, trolleys, inclined railways, and people movers. The federal government, through the FTA, provides financial assistance to develop new transit systems and improve, maintain, and operate existing systems. The FTA oversees grants to state and local transit providers, primarily through its ten regional offices. These providers are responsible for managing their programs in accordance with federal requirements, and the FTA is responsible for ensuring that grantees follow federal mandates along with statutory and administrative requirements.

== History ==
In 1962, President John F. Kennedy sent a message to the U.S. Congress calling for the creation of a program of federal capital assistance for mass transportation. President Kennedy said, "To conserve and enhance values in existing urban areas is essential. But at least as important are steps to promote economic efficiency and livability in areas of future development. Our national welfare therefore requires the provision of good urban transportation, with the properly balanced use of private vehicles and modern mass transport to help shape as well as serve urban growth."

President Lyndon B. Johnson signed the Urban Mass Transportation Act of 1964 into law, which passed the House by a vote of 212–129 and cleared the Senate 52–41, creating the Urban Mass Transportation Administration. The agency was charged with providing federal assistance for mass transit projects, including an initial $375 million in capital assistance over three years as mandated by the act. In 1991, the agency was renamed the Federal Transit Administration.

=== Administrators ===
Below is a list of past administrators.

Administrator	Term started	Term ended
Paul L. Sitton	1966	1969
Carlos C. Villarreal	1969	1973
Frank C. Herringer	1973	1975
Robert E. Patricelli	1975	1977
Richard S. Page	1977	1979
Theodore C. Lutz	1979	1981
Arthur Teele	1981	1983
Ralph L. Stanley	1983	1987
Alfred A. DelliBovi	1987	1989
Brian H. Clymer	1989	1993
Grace Crunican (acting)	1993	1993
Gordon Linton	1993	1999
Nuria I. Fernandez (acting)	1999	2001
Hiram J. Walker (acting)	January 20, 2001	July 2001
Jennifer L. Dorn	2001	2005
Sandra Bushue (acting)	January 2006	June 2006
James S. Simpson	June 2006	December 2008
Sherry Little (acting)	December 2008	January 20, 2009
Matthew Welbes (acting)	January 20, 2009	May 2009
Peter Rogoff	May 2009	January 16, 2014
Therese McMillan (acting)	January 16, 2014	March 31, 2016
Carolyn Flowers (acting)	April 1, 2016	January 20, 2017
Matthew Welbes (acting)	January 20, 2017	August 29, 2017
K. Jane Williams (acting)	August 29, 2017	January 20, 2021
Nuria I. Fernandez (acting)	January 20, 2021	July 1, 2021
Nuria I. Fernandez	July 1, 2021	February 24, 2024
Veronica Vanterpool (acting)	February 24, 2024	January 20, 2025
Matthew Welbes (acting)	January 20, 2025	May 1, 2025
Tariq Bokhari (acting)	May 1, 2025	August 4, 2025
Marc Molinaro	August 4, 2025	February 20, 2026
Matthew Welbes (acting)	February 20, 2026	April 3, 2026

== Notable programs ==
- Metropolitan & Statewide Planning
- Urbanized Formula Funding
- Clean Fuels Grant Program
- Major Capital Investments
- Fixed Guideway Modernization
- Transportation for Elderly Persons and Persons with Disabilities
- Formula Grants for Other than Urbanized Areas
- Public Transportation on Indian Reservations
- Rural Transit Assistance Program
- Transit Cooperative Research Program
- National Research & Technology Program
- Job Access and Reverse Commute Program
- New Freedom Program
- Bus and Bus Facilities
- Paul S. Sarbanes Transit in Parks Program
- Alternatives Analysis
- University Transportation Centers Program
- Over-the-Road Bus Program
- BUILD (Better Utilizing Investments to Leverage Development), formerly TIGER (Transit Investment Generating Economic Recovery)
- Transit Investments for Greenhouse Gas and Energy Reduction (TIGGER) Program
- Veterans Transportation and Community Living Initiative Capital Grants Program

== National Transit Database ==
Since 1974, the National Transit Database (NTD) has served as the repository for data on the financial, operating, and asset conditions of the public transit systems of the United States, statistics that FTA uses to help apportion funding to urbanized and rural areas in the country. NTD data products, which are all free and open to the public, reflect a wide range of characteristics of its participating systems, including agency funding sources, vehicle and facility inventories, maintenance and state-of-good repair reports, safety data, catalogues of available transit services, modal breakdown, ridership estimates, and transit employment numbers.

Specific metrics reported to the NTD by participating agencies include Vehicle Revenue Miles (VRM), Vehicle Revenue Hours (VRH), Passenger Miles Traveled (PMT), Unlinked Passenger Trips (UPT), and Operating Expenses (OE).

== See also ==
- Public transportation in the United States
