= LeAnna Washington =

American politician (born 1945)

LeAnna M. Washington

Member of the Pennsylvania Senate from the 4th district
- In office June 14, 2005 – January 6, 2015
- Preceded by: Allyson Schwartz
- Succeeded by: Arthur L. Haywood III
- Constituency: Part of Montgomery and Philadelphia Counties

Member of the Pennsylvania House of Representatives from the 200th district
- In office November 22, 1993 – June 14, 2005
- Preceded by: Gordon Linton
- Succeeded by: Cherelle Parker

Personal details
- Born: July 28, 1945 (age 81) Philadelphia, Pennsylvania, U.S.
- Party: Democratic
- Spouse: Divorced
- Children: 3 children
- Education: Lincoln University

LeAnna M. Washington (born July 28, 1945) is an American politician from Pennsylvania who served as a Democratic member of the Pennsylvania State Senate for the 4th district from 2005 to 2014. She served as a member of the Pennsylvania House of Representatives, District 200 from 1993 to 2005. She resigned in 2014 after being charged with a felony for using campaign staff and state resources to plan her birthday party fundraiser.

== Early life and education ==
Washington was born in Philadelphia. She attended West Philadelphia High School and received a Master of Health Science degree from Lincoln University in 1989.

Washington was a high school dropout, teen parent, and victim of domestic violence early in her marriage.

== Career ==
She worked as District Office Manager for former Pennsylvania State Senator Joseph Rocks and as manager of the Philadelphia Parking Authority Employee Assistance Program.

She was elected to the Pennsylvania House of Representatives, District 200 in a special election on November 2, 1993, following the resignation of Gordon J. Linton.

She was elected to represent the 4th senatorial district in the Pennsylvania Senate in a special election held on May 17, 2005.

On March 12, 2014, the Pennsylvania Attorney General's office announced felony charges of diversion of services and conflict of interest against Washington. The charges included usage of staff members and state equipment to plan her birthday party fundraiser.

In October 2014, Washington agreed to leave office early (she had already lost the primary) in exchange for being permitted to retain her retirement benefits. These benefits include lifetime health insurance and a state pension. She agreed to serve three months house arrest, five years of probation, and restitution of $200,000 to the Senate.
