= Peter E. Perry =

American politician

Member of the Pennsylvania House of Representatives from the 203rd district
- In office January 7, 1969 – November 30, 1976
- Preceded by: District Created
- Succeeded by: James Jones

Member of the Pennsylvania House of Representatives from the Philadelphia County district
- In office January 5, 1965 – November 30, 1968

Personal details
- Born: June 22, 1901 Philadelphia, Pennsylvania
- Died: May 17, 1993 (aged 91) Philadelphia, Pennsylvania
- Party: Democratic

Peter E. Perry (June 22, 1901 – May 17, 1993) was a Democratic member of the Pennsylvania House of Representatives.

During his tenure as a representative, Perry served as the Chairman of the State Government Committee.
