= Pennsylvania House of Representatives, District 203 =

American legislative district

Pennsylvania's 203rd State House of Representatives district
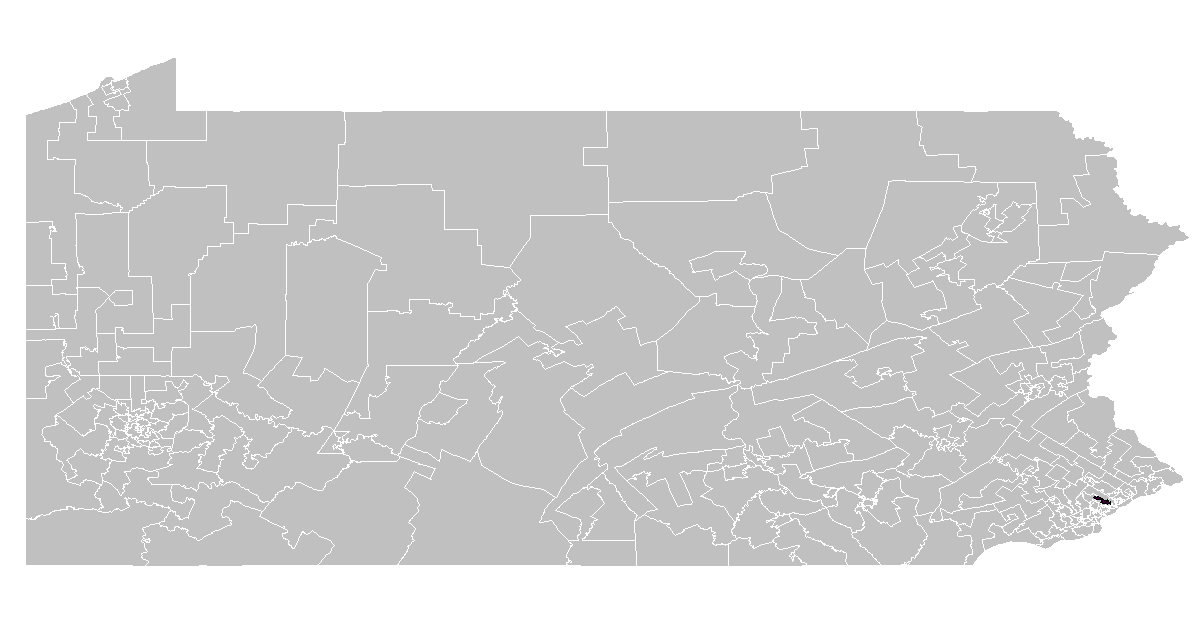
Representative
Anthony A. Bellmon; D–Philadelphia

The 203rd Pennsylvania House of Representatives District is located in Philadelphia County and includes the following areas:

- Ward 10
- Ward 35 [PART, Divisions 09, 10, 11, 13, 14, 16, 17, 18, 19, 20, 21, 22, 25, 27, 28 and 31]
- Ward 61 [PART, Divisions 04, 05, 06, 08, 09, 10, 11, 12, 13, 14, 15, 16, 17, 18, 19, 20, 21, 22, 23, 24, 25, 26, 27 and 28]

These wards correspond to parts of the West Oak Lane, Olney, and Crescentville neighborhoods of the city.

== Representatives ==
Representative	Party	Years	District home	Note
Prior to 1969, seats were apportioned by county.
Peter E. Perry	Democrat	1969 – 1976		
James F. Jones, Jr.	Democrat	1977 – 1980		
Dwight E. Evans	Democrat	1981 – 2016		Resigned to become U.S. Representative
Isabella Fitzgerald	Democrat	2017 – 2023		
Anthony A. Bellmon	Democrat	2023 – Present		Incumbent

== Recent election results ==
PA House election, 2022: Pennsylvania House of Representatives, District 203
Party	Candidate	Votes	%
Democratic	Anthony A. Bellmon	Unopposed	
Total votes		12,300	100.00
Democratic hold			
