= Bernard Gross =

American politician (1935–2024)

Member of the Pennsylvania House of Representatives from the 200th district
- In office 1969–1970
- Preceded by: District created
- Succeeded by: Rose Toll

Member of the Pennsylvania House of Representatives from the Philadelphia County district
- In office 1967–1968

Personal details
- Born: May 22, 1935 Philadelphia, Pennsylvania, U.S.
- Died: September 21, 2024 (aged 89)
- Party: Democratic

Bernard M. Gross (May 22, 1935 – September 21, 2024) was an American politician who served as a Democratic member of the Pennsylvania House of Representatives. He was born in Philadelphia.
