= James F. Jones Jr. =

American politician (1934–2021)

Member of the Pennsylvania House of Representatives from the 203rd district
- In office January 4, 1977 – November 30, 1980
- Preceded by: Peter Perry
- Succeeded by: Dwight Evans

Personal details
- Born: May 15, 1934 Pen Argyl, Pennsylvania, U.S.
- Died: June 22, 2021 (aged 87) Cocoa, Florida, U.S.
- Party: Democratic

James F. Jones Jr. (May 15, 1934 – June 22, 2021) was an American politician who was a Democratic member of the Pennsylvania House of Representatives. Jones was born in Pen Argyl, Pennsylvania on May 15, 1934. He died in Cocoa, Florida on June 22, 2021, at the age of 87.
