= Maurice Rabb Jr. =

American ophthalmologist (1932–2005)

Maurice F. Rabb Jr.
- Dr. Maurice F. Rabb Jr.
- Born: August 7, 1932; Shelbyville, Kentucky, U.S.
- Died: June 6, 2005 (aged 72); Chicago, Illinois, U.S.
- Education: University of Louisville
- Known for: Fluorescein Angiography, National Medical Association
- Children: 2, including Chris Rabb
- Scientific career
- Fields: Ophthalmology
- Workplaces: Mercy Hospital; University of Illinois at Chicago

Maurice F. Rabb Jr. (August 7, 1932 – June 6, 2005) was an American ophthalmologist. He is widely known for his pioneering work in cornea and retinal vascular diseases.

== Early life ==
Maurice Farnandis Rabb was born on August 7, 1932, in Shelbyville, Kentucky. He was the only child of Maurice F. Rabb Sr., a physician and a civil rights activist, and Jewel Miller Rabb, a math teacher and treasurer of the local NAACP branch, both graduates of Fisk University. He was interested in traveling and taking pictures in his early ages. He and another member of the Boy Scouts represented their region at the Boy Scout World Jamboree in Paris. At 14, Rabb was thinking about a career in photography which led him to the field of ophthalmology. Rabb graduated from Central High School in Louisville, Kentucky.

After attending Indiana University in Bloomington for two years, Rabb transferred to the University of Louisville in 1951 when this institution was desegregated. He graduated from the University of Louisville School of Medicine in 1958. He attended Kings County Hospital for postgraduate training. He studied ophthalmology at New York University and became the first African-American resident of the University of Illinois Eye and Ear Infirmary.

== Career ==
When he completed his residency, Rabb started a private practice in downtown Chicago which focused on retinal disease.

Rabb became the medical director of the Illinois Eye Bank and Research Laboratory at the University of Illinois. He was also the director of the fluorescein angiography Laboratory at the Michael Reese Hospital. In 1977, he was a full professor of clinical ophthalmology.

He served as the chairman of the Department of Ophthalmology at Mercy Hospital, president of the Medical Hospital Mercy Staff, and medical director of Prevent Blindness America.

Rabb founded the Comprehensive Sickle Cell Center at the University of Illinois (The University of Illinois Eye and Ear Infirmary) with a colleague, after obtaining a grant from the National Institutes of Health. The center was the only one in the country to diagnose and treat sickle cell eye disease. Rabb also led a research that helped prevent retinal detachment and blindness in sickle cell patients.

Rabb was recognized for his efforts to expand opportunities for doctors from underrepresented communities through the National Medical Association. Annually, the NMA awards the Rabb Venable Ophthalmology Award for Outstanding Research to students and residents for the best research presentations. Rabb also was a member of the Roman Barnes Society of the American Academy of Ophthalmology.

== Personal life ==
He was married to Madeline Murphy Rabb, daughter of William H. Murphy Sr. and Madeline Wheeler Murphy, for 39 years. They have two sons, engineer and business person, Maurice III (1967) and politician and author Chris Rabb (1970).

== Death ==
Rabb, a non-smoker, died on June 6, 2005, after a long battle with non-small cell lung cancer for which he was diagnosed in the winter of 2003.
