= Nuria I. Fernandez =

Panamanian-American transportation official (born 1959)

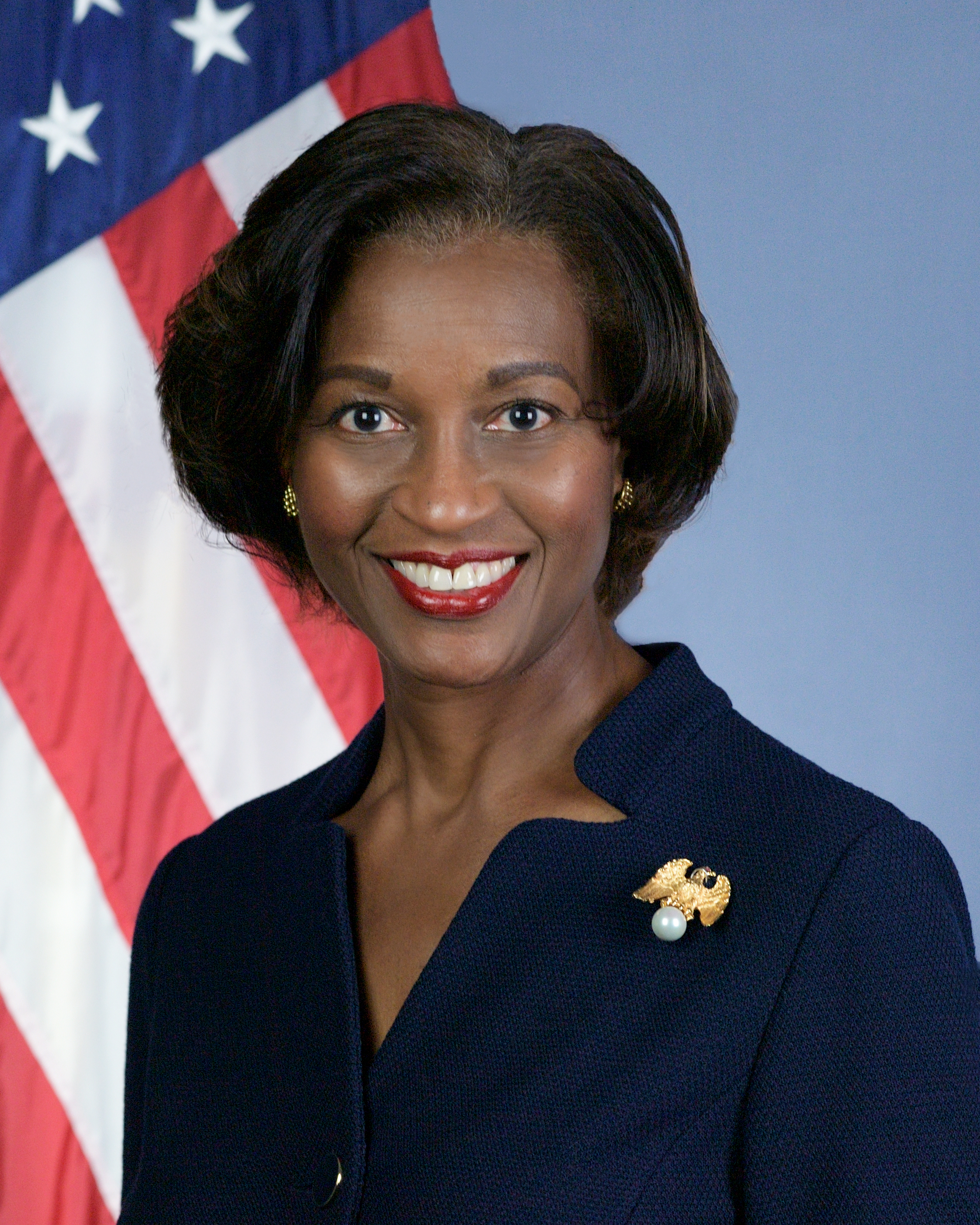
- Official portrait, 2021

Administrator of the Federal Transit Administration
- In office June 10, 2021 – February 24, 2024
- President: Joe Biden
- Preceded by: Peter Rogoff (2014)
- Succeeded by: Marc Molinaro
- In office January 20, 2021 – June 10, 2021 (Acting)

Personal details
- Born: November 15, 1959 (age 67) Panama City, Panama
- Education: Bradley University (BS); Roosevelt University (MBA)

Nuria I. Fernandez is a Panamanian-American civil engineer who served as the administrator of the Federal Transit Administration (FTA), from June 10, 2021, to February 24, 2024. After she was appointed as deputy administrator of the FTA on January 21, 2021, she served as the acting administrator until her confirmation in June. Fernandez has held leadership positions in large transit agencies, including as general manager and chief executive officer of the Santa Clara Valley Transportation Authority from 2014 to 2021, chief operating officer of the Metropolitan Transportation Authority (MTA) from 2011 to 2014, and senior vice president of design and construction for both the Chicago Transit Authority (CTA) and Washington Metropolitan Area Transit Authority (WMATA) from 1994 to 1997.

== Early life and education ==
Fernandez was born and raised in Panama City, Panama, with one older brother and one younger brother; her family is of Jamaican descent. She recalls having to rise early to go to school, as her family owned a single car. As she grew up, she lived in a small house. Fernandez emigrated to the United States to pursue higher education, earning a bachelor's degree in civil engineering from Bradley University (Peoria, Illinois, 1982) and a master's degree in business administration from Roosevelt University (Chicago, 1990).

== Career ==
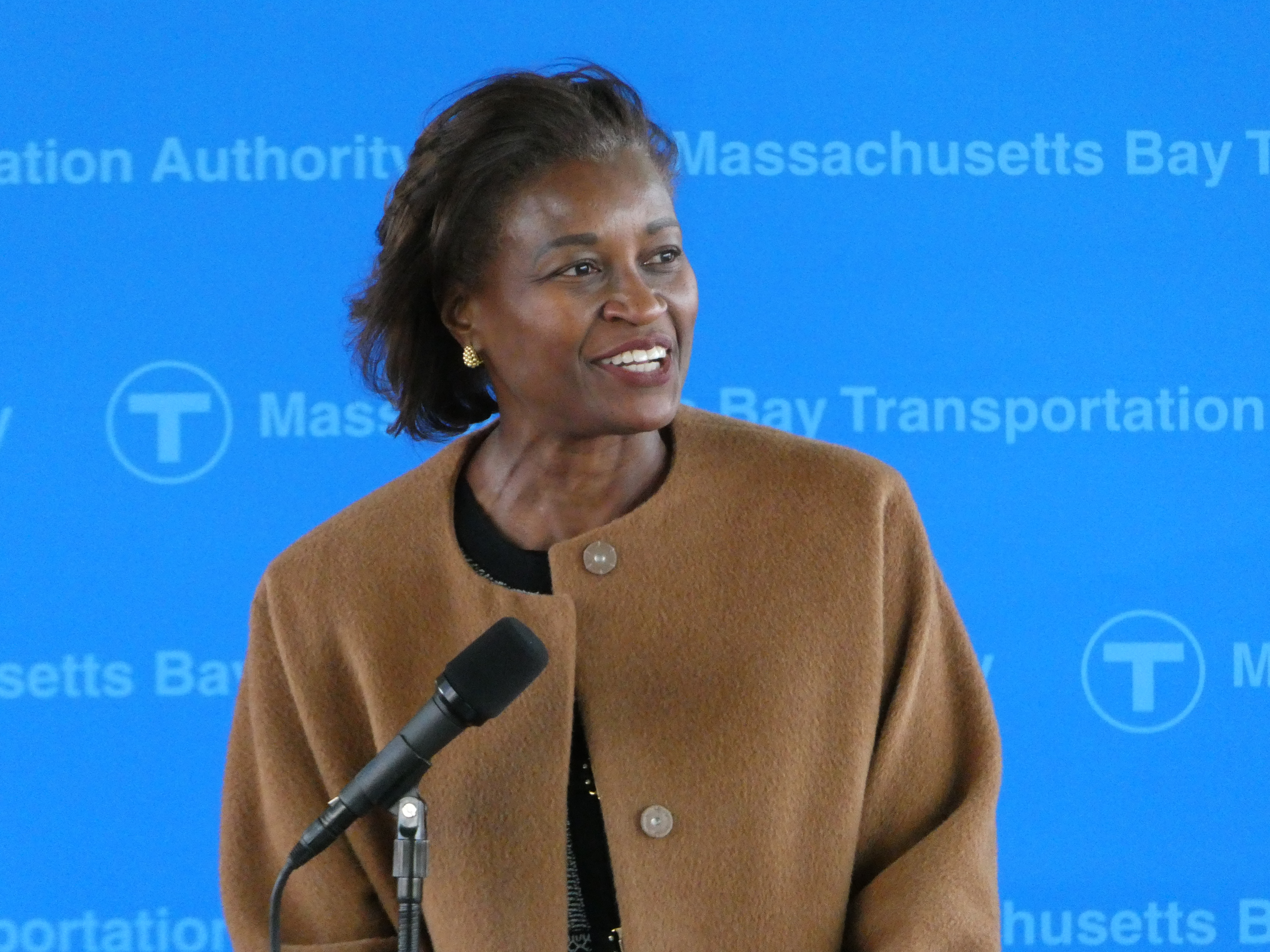
Fernandez speaks at the opening of the Green Line Extension in Boston, March 2022.

While studying at Bradley, Fernandez interned with the Panama Canal Company and the company hired her after graduating, in the engineering division of the Panama Canal's Gatún Locks. Afterward, Fernandez worked for the Chicago Department of Public Works (1983–1990) and CTA (1990-1993), where she planned and coordinated $1 billion in improvements to O'Hare International Airport. In addition, she was the special assistant to the assistant secretary for budget and programs at DOT (1993–1994) and the assistant general manager at WMATA (1994–1997), where she designed and oversaw construction of the $2.1 billion Metrorail extension project. In 1997, President Bill Clinton appointed her to be the FTA deputy administrator; Fernandez became the acting Administrator after Gordon Linton stepped down in 1999. Clinton nominated her to be the next Administrator in 2000, and she appeared before the Senate Committee on Banking, Housing, and Urban Affairs on May 11. Her nomination was returned to the president in December 2000.

After her first stint at the FTA, Fernandez joined private engineering consulting firms Earth Tech (based in Long Beach, California) and CH2M (based in Englewood, Colorado). There she worked on projects in Panama, including program management for the Panama Canal Authority and updates to the country's public transit plan. Fernandez served as the commissioner of the Chicago Department of Aviation from April 2006 to April 2008, when she resigned. At the time, the resignation was regarded as a consequence of failing to close a deal with United Airlines and American Airlines for a second round of expansions at O'Hare, as well as numerous flight delays and cancellations during her tenure.

During the starts of the Obama and Biden administrations, Fernandez was considered for appointment as the United States Secretary of Transportation. Fernandez was appointed as MTA COO by Governor Andrew Cuomo in October 2011 alongside MTA chair Joseph Lhota. She left the MTA to lead the VTA in 2013. Under her leadership, VTA partnered with Bay Area Rapid Transit (BART) to build the Silicon Valley BART extension, continuing the lines from their prior terminus in Fremont, California to San Jose. From 2019 to 2020, Fernandez also served as the chair of the American Public Transportation Association (APTA).

In January 2021, the FTA announced that Fernandez had been appointed as deputy Administrator, where she would serve as the acting Administrator until she was confirmed in the Senate by voice vote on June 10, 2021. Coincidentally, her hearing before the same Senate Banking Committee was held exactly twenty-one years after her first hearing for the nomination to FTA Administrator by Clinton. Fernandez was the first FTA Administrator confirmed by the Senate since Peter Rogoff, in May 2009; Prior to Fernandez, the most recent acting Administrator was K. Jane Williams, who had been acting since January 3, 2020 after the nomination of Thelma Drake was returned.
