= Herman Toll =

American politician (1907–1967)

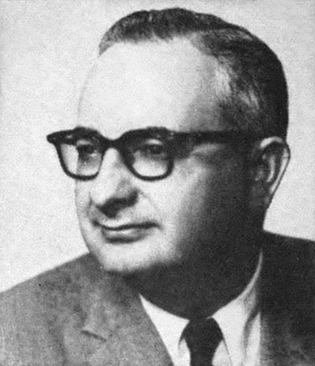

Member of the U.S. House of Representatives from Pennsylvania
- In office January 3, 1959 – January 3, 1967
- Preceded by: Hugh Scott
- Succeeded by: Joshua Eilberg
- Constituency: 6th district (1959-1963); 4th district (1963-1967)

Personal details
- Born: March 15, 1907 Boguslav, Russian Empire (now Ukraine)
- Died: July 26, 1967 (aged 60) Philadelphia, Pennsylvania, U.S.
- Party: Democratic

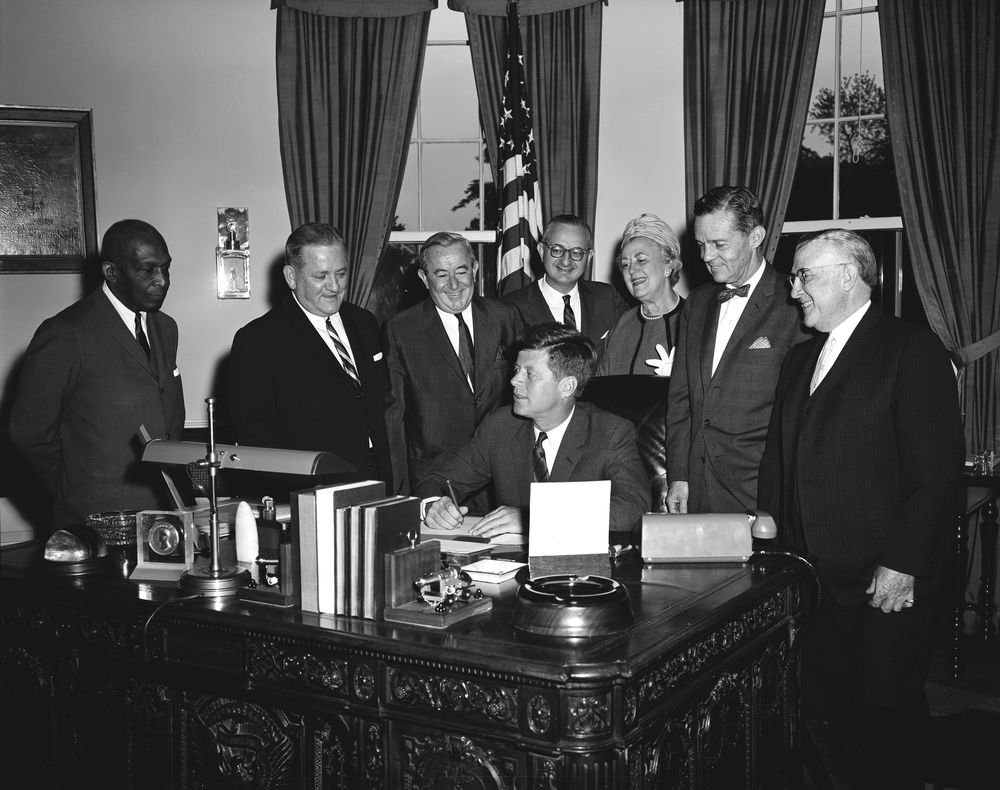
Rep. Herman Toll (D-PA), standing center with fellow Pennsylvania congressmen, meets with President John F. Kennedy, May 18, 1961

Herman Toll (March 15, 1907 – July 26, 1967) was an American politician who served Pennsylvania in the United States House of Representatives from 1959 to 1967. A member of the Democratic Party, he supported the civil rights movement, and sponsored legislation to create several federal agencies, including the U.S. Department of Urban Affairs and Housing.

== Life and career ==
Born in Bohuslav, a city about 60 mi (97 km) southeast of Kyiv in the Russian Empire (now in Ukraine), Toll immigrated with his family to the United States around 1910. He graduated from Temple University School of Law in Philadelphia without a college degree (not a requirement at the time); he started practicing law in 1930. He was a member of the Pennsylvania Prison Society, Philadelphia Housing Association, B'nai B'rith and the board of directors of the Crusader Savings & Loan Association. In 1950 he was elected to the Pennsylvania State House of Representatives, where he served as vice chairman of the Judiciary Committee and helped secure passage of the first Fair Employment Practices law in the state. He was re-elected in 1952, 1954 and 1956.

== Tenure ==
Rep. Toll was elected in 1958 as a Democrat to the United States Congress, becoming the first Jewish representative of the sixth Congressional district of Pennsylvania. He was re-elected three times—the final two times to represent the fourth Congressional district—and served until shortly before his death in 1967. In his first term he was named a member of the House Judiciary Committee as well as of its Subcommittee on Immigration and Nationality. Toward the end of his third term Rep. Toll was diagnosed with amyotrophic lateral sclerosis, better known as Lou Gehrig's Disease. Unable to campaign aggressively, he nevertheless easily won a fourth term; due to illness he would serve in absentia without making an appearance in the House. He was not a candidate for re-election in 1966 and he died the following year at the age of 60.

A supporter of civil rights during his time in Congress, Rep. Toll exchanged at least one letter with Dr. Martin Luther King Jr. In Rep. Toll's February 19, 1964, reply he promises that he will "continue to work for the strongest possible Civil Rights legislation at the earliest possible date."

Contemporaries described Rep. Toll as intelligent, articulate, hard-working and passionate about politics, though his personality was not naturally outgoing. A short biography by Milton Friedman in The Canadian Jewish Chronicle, which appeared in 1959 shortly after he won a seat to Congress, said he possessed "the quick, Talmudic mind of his grandfather, a learned rabbi." In a 1997 interview, his son Gilbert recalled that his father "was rarely home...Even when he was home he sometimes would have meetings there. I think he took my brother and me fishing once and to one ballgame. Politics was his life." It wasn't unusual for Rep. Toll to take meetings during his commute on the train between Philadelphia and Washington.

== Legislation ==
During his time in the U.S. Congress Rep. Toll sponsored legislation to create the following federal agencies:

1. Federal Recreation Services
2. Youth Conservation Corps
3. Department of Urban Affairs and Housing
4. US Disarmament Agency for World Peace

== Family history ==
Herman Toll was the son of Mechel (Max), a plaster contractor, and Rifkah (Rebecca). For most of his life he was a member of Temple Judea in Philadelphia. On his death Herman Toll was survived by his wife, the former Rose Ornstein (d. 1997), who served in the Pennsylvania State Legislature from 1970 to 1974. They had two sons, Sheldon and Gilbert, both of whom became attorneys. He was also survived by a brother, Albert Toll, whose two sons Robert (Bob) and Bruce followed their father into the real estate business as Toll Brothers.

== See also ==
- List of Jewish members of the United States Congress

== Sources ==
- United States Congress. "Herman Toll (id: T000297)". Biographical Directory of the United States Congress.
- The Political Graveyard

U.S. House of Representatives
Preceded by Hugh Scott	Member of the U.S. House of Representatives from Pennsylvania's 6th congressional district 1959–1963	Succeeded by George M. Rhodes
Preceded by Robert N. C. Nix Sr.	Member of the U.S. House of Representatives from Pennsylvania's 4th congressional district 1963–1967	Succeeded by Joshua Eilberg
