= National Rural Transit Assistance Program =

The National Rural Transit Assistance Program (National RTAP) is a program of the Federal Transit Administration administered by the Neponset Valley Transportation Management Association and serves as the national arm for the Rural Transit Assistance Program. The mission of National RTAP is to improve mobility in all rural, small urban, and tribal communities across the country through technical assistance and training for transit providers. Since its inception in 1987 National RTAP has developed and distributed training materials, provided technical assistance, generated reports, published best practices, conducted research and offered Peer Assistance with the goal of improved mobility for the millions of Americans living in communities with populations under 50,000.
