= Tonyelle Cook-Artis =

American politician

Member of the Pennsylvania House of Representatives from the 200th district
- In office April 5, 2016 – January 3, 2017
- Preceded by: Cherelle Parker
- Succeeded by: Chris Rabb

Personal details
- Born: September 2, 1974 (age 52) Philadelphia, Pennsylvania, United States
- Party: Democratic
- Education: Bennett College (Bachelor of Science in political science and government, 2001); George Washington University (Master of Arts in political management, 2013)

Tonyelle Cook-Artis is an American politician and government agency executive from the Commonwealth of Pennsylvania.

Currently the director of government relations and grants administration for the Delaware River Port Authority in Philadelphia, she previously served as a member of the Pennsylvania House of Representatives, representing the 200th House district in Philadelphia for one term in 2016.

== Formative years ==
Born on September 2, 1974, in Philadelphia, Pennsylvania, Tonyelle Cook graduated from Lankenau High School in 1997. Awarded a Bachelor of Science degree in political science and government by Bennett College in 2001, she was earned her Master of Arts degree in political management at George Washington University in 2013.

== Career ==
Prior to her election to the Pennsylvania House of Representatives, Cook-Artis was employed as a staff assistant to U.S. Congresswoman Alma Adams, as a constituent service representative for Philadelphia City Councilwoman Marian B. Tasco, and as the chief-of-staff to Pennsylvania Representative Cherelle Parker.

In March 2016, Cook-Artis won a special election to complete Parker's term, after Parker resigned from the House to take a seat on the Philadelphia City Council. In April of that same year, Chris Rabb defeated Cook-Artis in the Democratic primary election by a margin of 47.4 percent to 41.4 percent.

From March 2017 to November 2021, Cook-Artis was employed as the manager of government relations for the Delaware River Port Authority in Philadelphia. In November 2021, she was promoted within that organization to the position of acting director of government relations.

== Community service ==
Cook-Artis has been a member of multiple community service and political organizations, including the:

- 50th Ward Committee,
- National Coalition of 100 Black Women, and the
- Pennsylvania Women’s Campaign Fund.
