= Gordon Linton =

American politician

Gordon J. Linton
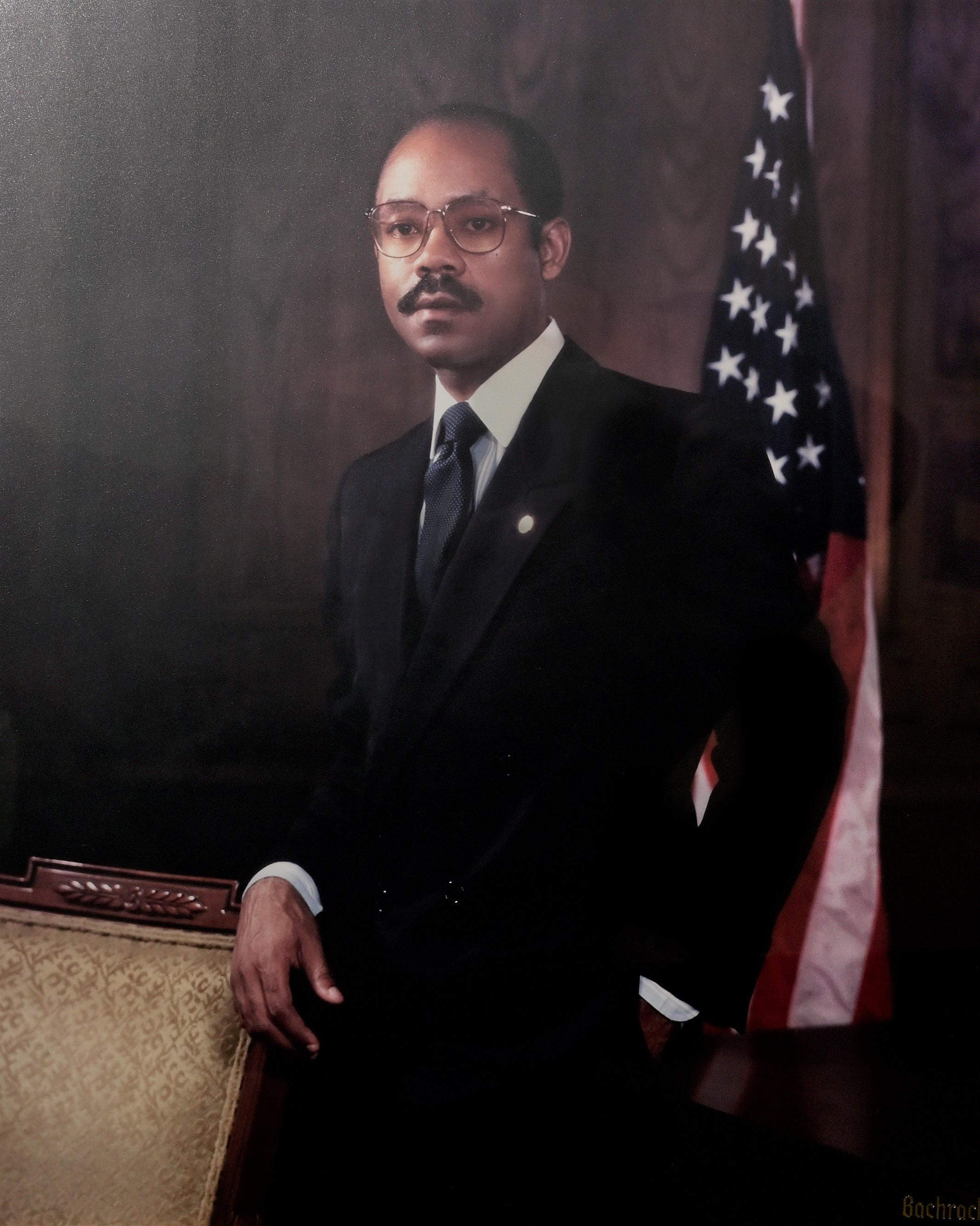
- Federal Transit Administration Official portrait

Administrator of the Federal Transit Administration
- In office 1993–1999
- President: Bill Clinton
- Preceded by: Brian Clymer
- Succeeded by: Jennifer Dorn

Member of the Pennsylvania House of Representatives from the 200th district
- In office January 4, 1983 – August 13, 1993
- Preceded by: John F. White Jr.
- Succeeded by: LeAnna Washington

Personal details
- Born: March 26, 1948 (age 78) Philadelphia, Pennsylvania, U.S.
- Party: Democratic
- Education: Lincoln University, B.A. Antioch University, M.Ed

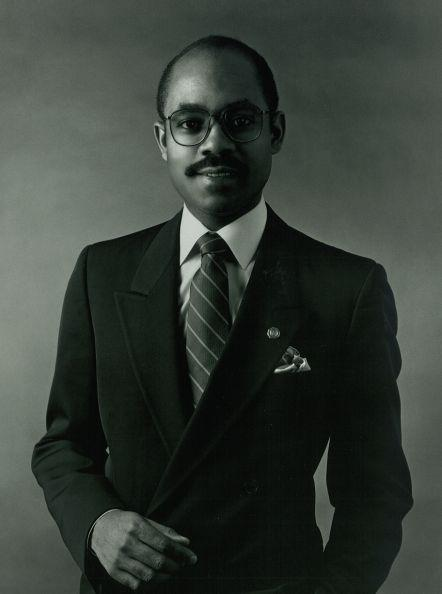
Representative Gordon Linton

Gordon Linton (full name: Gordon J. Linton; born March 26, 1948) is a former American politician from Pennsylvania best known for his role as the former head of the Federal Transit Administration in the US Department of Transportation from 1993 to 1999. Linton also served as a legislator in the Pennsylvania House of Representatives from 1982 to 1993, representing the 200th Legislative District in Philadelphia. His career in public policy focused on developing and implementing initiatives that aimed to empower underserved individuals and communities.

== Early life and education ==
Linton was born in Philadelphia, Pennsylvania and resided in North Philadelphia with his homemaker mother, his construction worker and barber father, and his younger brother. Linton attended William Kelly Elementary School, Vaux Junior High School, Thomas Edison High School, and graduated from Olney High School in 1965.

John E. Allen, founder of New Freedom Theatre, encouraged Linton to attend Peirce Junior College (now Peirce College), a noted Philadelphia business school where he earned his associate degree in business management in 1967. He continued his studies at Lincoln University, the nation's first degree-granting Historically Black College and University (HBCU) in Oxford, Pennsylvania, where he graduated in 1970 with a BA in economics. Years later he served as the commonwealth appointee to the university's Board of Trustees and endowed a public policy scholarship there. In 1997 he received an honorary Doctor of Laws from Lincoln University for his contributions to the Commonwealth of Pennsylvania and his distinguished career in service to the people. Linton completed his education at Antioch University, Philadelphia where he earned a Master of Education in Counseling/Psychology in 1974.

== Career ==
=== Psychology ===
Early in his career Linton saw first-hand the degree to which people's lives are influenced by forces beyond their control. After graduating from Lincoln University Linton was mentored by Dr. Warren E. Smith and assigned to the Counseling Services Project, where he worked as part of a team with psychologists in Philadelphia's parochial schools.

This experience led Linton to adopt a holistic approach to addressing clients' social and economic needs. He began by focusing on educational, community-centered programs to empower children and families in Philadelphia, serving in one of his first positions as a community consultant with the School District of Philadelphia. Linton also served as education director for Baptist Children's House, a facility for neglected/dependent children in Philadelphia. He concluded his work as an educational psychology specialist working with adolescents and families at the Philadelphia Child Guidance Center.

=== Commonwealth of Pennsylvania ===
Linton became actively involved in the development, promotion, and administration of state-funded community-based programs. As Eastern Regional Administrator for the Commonwealth of Pennsylvania's Office of the Auditor General he conducted operational and compliance audits of public welfare agencies with his having control over all logistical aspects, audit direction, and regulated adherence to proper audit procedures. Linton successfully fulfilled his fiduciary responsibility in managing the Commonwealth's financial resources while ensuring maximum benefit to clients in underserved communities.

=== Pennsylvania House of Representatives ===
In the late 1970s Linton was engaged in political activity and community organizing in Northwest Philadelphia. With the support and encouragement of his predecessor John F. White Jr. he was elected to the Pennsylvania House of Representatives in 1982, representing the 200th Legislative District. At that time the district included parts of the Northwest Philadelphia neighborhoods of West Oak Lane, East Mount Airy, Chestnut Hill, and Upper Roxborough. He quickly moved into leadership on the House Transportation Committee, being the prime sponsor and author of 12 legislative proposals that are now law.

During his first term in the Pennsylvania Legislature Linton was appointed chair of the House Select Committee on Minority & Women-Owned Businesses after calling for an investigation (H.R. 277) into the number of minority and women-owned businesses receiving contracts from Commonwealth of Pennsylvania agencies. He also introduced a resolution, adopted by the full House, granting the committee subpoena power.

In 1984 he introduced Act 230, which regulated the infiltration of "front" and "sham" operations into minority and women-owned business programs, receiving national attention. At the request of Majority Leader James Manderino he co-sponsored minority business working capital legislation and managed the floor debate. The resulting law became part of the Pennsylvania Economic Revitalization Fund of 1984 and established a $5 million revolving loan fund and bonding guarantee fund for minority businesses.

Linton served as chair of the Pennsylvania Legislative Black Caucus from 1986 to 1993 during which time he worked to increase minority business participation in state contracts and worked with the governor to create an Office of Minority and Women-Owned Business. He introduced and engineered passage of the legislation establishing the Commonwealth's first dedicated funding source for mass transit, as well as Pennsylvania's first law requiring mandatory seat belt use. He also introduced legislation directing Pennsylvania's share of the Benjamin Franklin Estate Trust to Commonwealth Community Foundations for perpetual endowments.

Linton created the House Task Force on the Senior Citizens Shared Ride Program and, as its chair, worked to maintain the program's funding level. He served as vice chair of the House Appropriations Committee and was appointed by Governor Robert P. Casey Sr. to the Special Philadelphia Trial Court Nominating Commission, formed to nominate judicial candidates following a judicial misconduct case. He was also a Commonwealth Trustee of Lincoln University and a member of the Conference of Minority Transportation Officials, the Transportation Institute Advisory Council, and the Pennsylvania Department of Transportation's Disadvantaged Business Advisory Council.

=== Federal Transit Administration ===
Because of his expertise and success on transportation issues in the Pennsylvania Legislature, Linton was nominated by President Bill Clinton, confirmed by the US Senate, and appointed as the Federal Transit Administrator in the federal Department of Transportation in 1993. As President Bill Clinton said at Linton's 1993 nomination announcement, "Gordon Linton is a distinguished public servant with an unquestionable knowledge of transportation matters."

During his tenure Linton served as the nation's leading official for national public transportation policy and programs. He helped shape and represent President Clinton's public transportation policies and budget and provided executive direction over all federal transit programs, nationally and internationally. Linton managed an annual budget of $5 billion and his department's employees were spread across the Federal Transportation Administration's (FTA) Washington, DC headquarters and 10 regional offices. He was responsible for more than $37 billion in federal investments in public transportation and negotiated Full Funding agreements totaling $10 billion for 22 new projects. In 1994 he spearheaded statutory changes and policies that launched the FTA's Livable Community Initiative as a national policy framework, promoting closer connections between public transit and the communities it serves. He also established the first international transportation program in FTA's history, forging partnerships abroad, briefing foreign governments on US public transit policy, and representing the United States in government-to-government bilateral agreements and trade missions.

Linton launched the Bus Rapid Transit Consortium, selecting 17 cities to take part in collaboration, project scoping, and best-practice development for a national program promoting rapid bus transit as an emerging service option. He also led a delegation to Curitiba, Brazil to study its rapid dedicated bus system, which helped accelerate the system's adoption in the United States. He also helped negotiate a memorandum of understanding between the Federal Transit Administration, the Federal Highway Administration, and the South African Department of Transport, establishing technology transfer centers and education, training, and business development opportunities with the South African government.
