= Pennsylvania House of Representatives, District 200 =

American legislative district

Pennsylvania's 200th State House of Representatives district
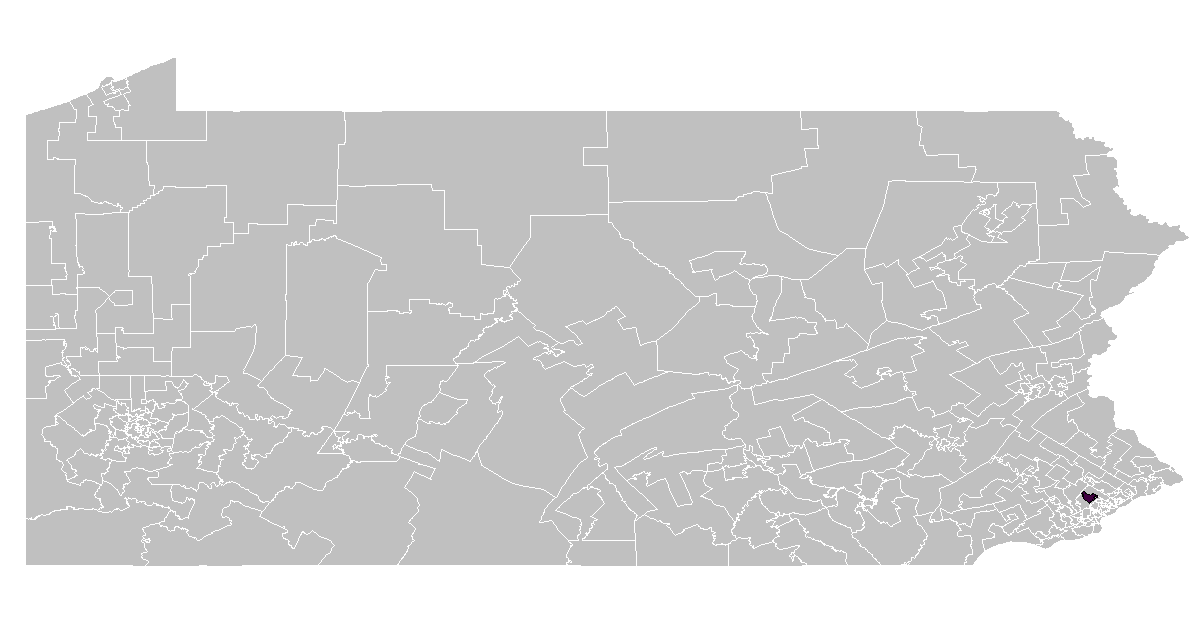
Representative
Chris Rabb; D–Philadelphia

The 200th Pennsylvania House of Representatives District is located in Philadelphia County and includes the following areas:

- Ward 09
- Ward 22
- Ward 50

== Representatives ==
Representative	Party	Years	District home	Note
Prior to 1969, seats were apportioned by county.
Bernard M. Gross	Democrat	1969 – 1970		
Rose Toll	Democrat	1971 – 1976		
John F. White, Jr.	Democrat	1977 – 1982		Resigned November 13, 1981 after election to Philadelphia City Council
Gordon J. Linton	Democrat	1983 – 1994		Resigned August 13, 1993
Leanna M. Washington	Democrat	1993 – 2005		Elected to fill vacancy on November 2, 1993; Resigned on June 14, 2005 after election to Pennsylvania Senate
Cherelle Parker	Democrat	2005 – 2015		Election to fill vacancy on September 13, 2005 Resigned December 31, 2015 to join Philadelphia City Council
Tonyelle Cook-Artis	Democrat	2016 – 2017		Election to fill vacancy, Assumed office April 5, 2016
Christopher M. Rabb	Democrat	2017 – present		

== Recent election results ==
PA House election, 2022: Pennsylvania House of Representatives, District 200
Party	Candidate	Votes	%
Democratic	Christopher M. Rabb	29,663	96.06
Republican	Kionna West	1,216	3.94
Total votes		30,879	100.00
Democratic hold			
