= White House Conference on Small Business =

The White House Conference on Small Business was a series of three conferences that occurred in 1980, 1986, and 1995. They were convened by presidents Jimmy Carter, Ronald Reagan and Bill Clinton in an effort to foster better relationships with members of the business community and to develop innovative policy solutions to economic problems.
