= The Orlando Times =

Weekly newspaper based in Orlando, Florida

- Type: Weekly newspaper (Published Every Thursday)
- Founder(s): Dr. Calvin Collins and several of his colleagues
- Editor: Kevin T. Collins
- Staff writers: Devin Heflin Jalessa Castillo
- Founded: 1976
- Headquarters: Orlando, Florida
- Circulation: 7,000
- Website: orlando-times.com

The Orlando Times is a weekly newspaper published in Orlando, Florida, and surrounding counties. The newspaper was founded by publisher Dr. Calvin Collins and several of his colleagues on July 5, 1976. According to the paper's website, the paper aims to publish African-American news from a Black perspective. The paper ran its final issue in June 2026.
