= Dwight Evans (politician) =

American politician (born 1954)

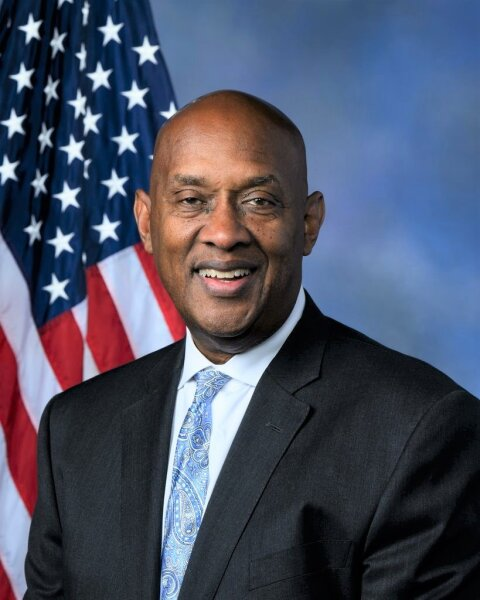
- Official portrait, c. 2022

Member of the U.S. House of Representatives from Pennsylvania
- Incumbent
- Assumed office November 8, 2016 (Note: Evans's official service begins on the date of the special election, while he was not sworn in until November 14, 2016.)
- Preceded by: Chaka Fattah
- Constituency: 2nd district (2016–2019); 3rd district (2019–present)

Member of the Pennsylvania House of Representatives from the 203rd district
- In office January 4, 1981 – November 14, 2016
- Preceded by: James Jones
- Succeeded by: Isabella Fitzgerald

Personal details
- Born: May 16, 1954 (age 72) Philadelphia, Pennsylvania, U.S.
- Party: Democratic
- Education: Community College of Philadelphia (attended); La Salle University (BA)
- Website: House website Campaign website

Dwight E. Evans (born May 16, 1954) is an American politician and former educator serving as the U.S. representative for Pennsylvania's 3rd congressional district since 2016. A member of the Democratic Party, he previously served in the Pennsylvania House of Representatives, representing the 203rd district from 1981 to 2016.

Evans defeated incumbent Chaka Fattah in the Democratic primary election for Pennsylvania's 2nd congressional district and won a special election on November 8, 2016. The district, which was renumbered to become Pennsylvania's 3rd congressional district in 2019, includes most of Center City, West, Northwest, and South Philadelphia.

On June 30, 2025, Evans announced he would not seek reelection in 2026.

== Early life, education, and early career ==
Evans grew up in the Germantown and West Oak Lane sections of Philadelphia. He is a graduate of Germantown High School (1971), Community College of Philadelphia (1973), and La Salle University (1975). After his college graduation, he became a teacher in the School District of Philadelphia and an employment counselor for the Urban League.

== Pennsylvania House of Representatives ==
Evans was first elected to the Pennsylvania House of Representatives in 1980. He represented the 203rd district. His district, which encompassed West Oak Lane in Philadelphia, was heavily Democratic and was 95% African-American. Evans was re-elected 18 times. He served in the Pennsylvania House until 2016.

Evans was elected as the Democratic chairman of the House Appropriations Committee in 1990. He served in that capacity for 20 years and is the first African-American to chair the committee.

In 2010, the Philadelphia Tribune named Evans one of the 10 most influential African-Americans in the city.

== Unsuccessful elections ==
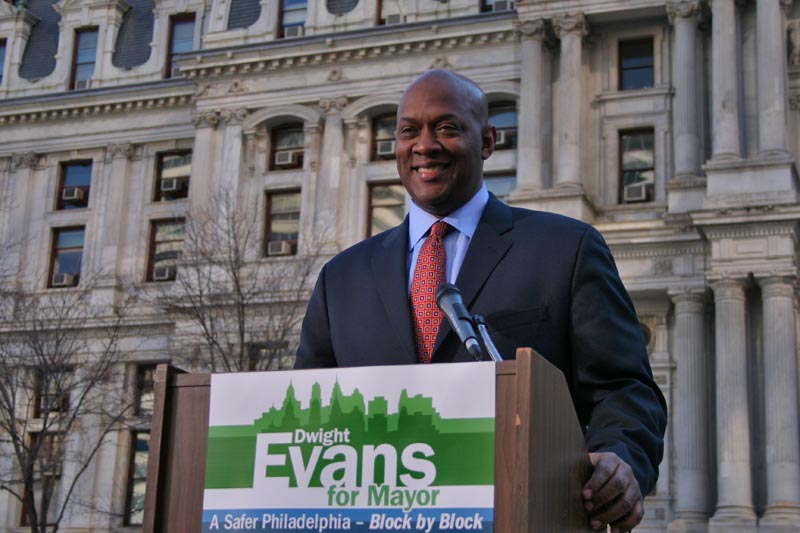
Evans speaking during his 2007 mayoral campaign

Before his election to Congress, Evans unsuccessfully ran for higher office four times. In 1986, he sought the Democratic nomination for lieutenant governor, but finished third in the primary election to future Lieutenant Governor Mark Singel.

In 1994, Evans became the first African American candidate to run for governor of Pennsylvania. In the Democratic primary election, he faced Singel and Lynn Yeakel. He was endorsed by The Philadelphia Inquirer, Philadelphia Daily News, and Pittsburgh Post-Gazette. Evans finished second in the primary with 22%.

Evans ran for mayor of Philadelphia twice. In 1999, in the race to succeed Ed Rendell, he finished fifth with 4.7% of the vote in a crowded primary won by John Street. In 2007, despite Rendell's comment that Evans was the "best qualified" for mayor, he finished fifth again, taking only 7.82% of the vote.

== U.S. House of Representatives ==
=== Elections ===
==== 2016 special and general ====
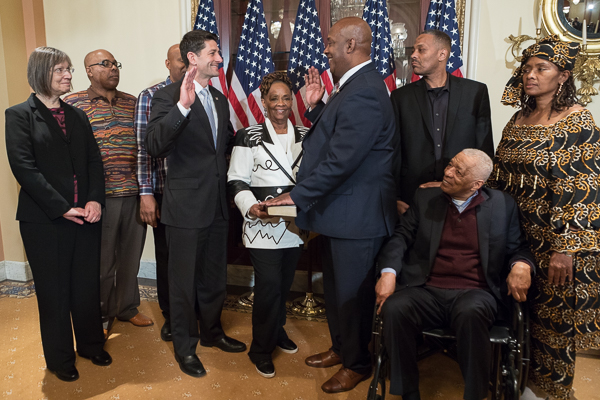
Evans being sworn in by Speaker Paul Ryan

In November 2015, Evans announced that he would run for Pennsylvania's 2nd congressional district in 2016 against Democratic incumbent Chaka Fattah. In an upset, Evans beat Fattah for the Democratic nomination – the real contest in this heavily Democratic, black-majority district – on April 26, 2016. He won mainly by running up his margins in his Olney-Oak Lane stronghold. Fattah resigned two months later amid a corruption scandal.

As a result, Evans ran in two elections on November 8, 2016 – a special election for the balance of Fattah's sixth term, and a regular election for a full two-year term. He won both, and was sworn in on November 14. This gave Evans more seniority than other new members of Congress elected in 2016. His district has been in Democratic hands without interruption since 1949, and has been represented by black congressmen since 1959.

==== 2018 ====
A court-ordered redistricting ahead of the 2018 elections renumbered Evans's district as the 3rd district. It lost its share of Montgomery County and was pushed slightly further into Philadelphia. The new 3rd was as heavily Democratic as the old 2nd, and Evans handily defeated Republican challenger Bryan Leib to win his second full term.

==== 2020 ====
Evans was reelected in 2020 with 91% of the vote, defeating Republican Michael Harvey.

==== 2022 ====
Evans defeated Alexandra Hunt in the 2022 Democratic primary. Evans defeated Socialist Workers Party candidate Christopher Hoeppner with 95% of the vote.

==== 2024 ====
Evans defeated Tracey Gordon in the 2024 Democratic primary. He ran unopposed in the general election.

=== Tenure ===
In August 2017, following the aftermath of the 2017 Unite the Right rally in Charlottesville, Virginia, Evans and Representative Adriano Espaillat introduced legislation banning Confederate monuments on federal property.

Evans is a member of the Congressional Progressive Caucus and the Congressional Black Caucus.

On May 23, 2024, Evans announced that he had suffered a minor stroke and would be away from Congress for six weeks while recovering. He returned to Washington and resumed work there in January 2025.

In June 2025, Evans announced that he would not seek re-election in the 2026 midterms. Evans added that he intended to serve the rest of his current term.

=== Committee assignments ===
- Committee on Ways and Means
  - Subcommittee on Health
  - Subcommittee on Work and Welfare

Past assignments

- Committee on Small Business

=== Caucus memberships ===
- Black Maternal Health Caucus
- Congressional Equality Caucus
- Congressional Progressive Caucus
- Congressional Black Caucus
- Congressional Ukraine Caucus

== Political positions ==
According to a FiveThirtyEight analysis, Evans voted with President Joe Biden's stated position 100% of the time in the 117th Congress.

=== Crime ===
In September 2018, Evans voted against HR 6691, the Community Safety and Security Act of 2018. The bill would amend the definition of "crime of violence". Within the definition of "crime of violence" is fleeing a police officer in a vehicle or on foot.

In 2021, he voted for the Bipartisan Background Checks Act and the Enhanced Background Checks Act.

In April 2022, Evans announced a $51 billion, seven-point plan to fight gun violence in Philadelphia and around the country.

=== Health care ===
Evans has supported three public health option bills in Congress.

=== Housing ===
In 2021, Evans announced a $63 billion "Housing Is Essential" plan with Representatives Matt Cartwright and Mike Doyle.

=== Impeachment of Donald Trump ===
Evans was an early congressional supporter of impeaching President Donald Trump. He voted for the 2019 and 2021 impeachment resolutions.

=== Infrastructure ===
Evans voted for the Infrastructure Investment and Jobs Act. The legislation includes the $1 billion Reconnecting Communities initiative that he co-led.

=== Israel ===
Evans voted to provide Israel with support following October 7 attacks.

=== Ukraine ===
In 2022, the Russian government permanently banned Evans and many other members of Congress from traveling to Russia. The ban was imposed in retaliation for sanctions imposed by the U.S. on Russia in connection with the Russo-Ukrainian War.

== Personal life ==
Evans has never married and has been described as "extremely protective" when discussing his private life.

On May 23, 2024, Evans announced that he had suffered a minor stroke.

== See also ==
- List of African-American United States representatives

U.S. House of Representatives
Preceded by Chaka Fattah	Member of the U.S. House of Representatives from Pennsylvania's 2nd congressional district 2016–2019	Succeeded by Brendan Boyle
Preceded by Mike Kelly	Member of the U.S. House of Representatives from Pennsylvania's 3rd congressional district 2019–present	Incumbent
U.S. order of precedence (ceremonial)
Preceded by James Comer	United States representatives by seniority 152nd	Succeeded by Brad Schneider
