= Believe in Nothing =

Studio album by Paradise Lost
- Released: 26 February 2001
- Recorded: April–September 2000
- Studio: Albert Studios, London; The Strongroom, London; Chapel Studios, Lincolnshire
- Genre: Gothic rock; alternative rock; electronic rock
- Length: 46:00
- Label: EMI Electrola
- Producer: John Fryer, Greg Brimson

Paradise Lost chronology
Host (1999)	Believe in Nothing (2001)	Symbol of Life (2002)

Believe in Nothing is the eighth studio album by British gothic metal band Paradise Lost, released on 26 February 2001.

== Release ==
The release for the album was postponed with the first release date being 18 September 2000, before settling to its current date. The band released commented on the reason for the delay stating:

"As you know near to Christmas many artists all rush to release "Best Of" albums in a hope of increased sales. Paradise Lost feel that the new album is far too special to merely be lost among thousands of others and, by releasing in January will avoid this."

== Style, artwork, and reception ==
Professional ratings
Review scores
Source	Rating
AllMusic	3/5 stars

It is one of the last albums in the much lighter sound which characterised the band's sound since One Second and that may have been contributed when composer Gregor Mackintosh stated that "doesn't really exist for him", as it was an album in which the band was out of creative control; the album went under strict instructions from the label. Mackintosh has also said that he feels some songs, such as "World Pretending", deserved a better sound and production.

There was more negativity of the album when the band's vocalist Nick Holmes was asked by fans of a Q&A session about in general how does the band choose who does the album artwork, Holmes stated "Don't ask me about the BIN cover, I think we (the band) had our drinks spiked that day!"

In 2007, Holmes elaborated:

"We were never really happy with the production on that album. I think the songs on the album were good, but I definitely wouldn't rank the album overall in amongst our top five albums ever. We were all very confused by a lot of things going on around us at the time, hence the cover! (Laughs) I think they were pretty grim times, and I think that's reflected on the rather dour tone of the songs. Practically all of us were on prescribed drugs at that time! (Laughs) I was taking such strong anti-depressants at the time that I didn't really know what was going on at the time. The artwork for the album is a classic example where our brains were at the time. There were just bees in my head! (Laughs) I have no idea what that cover was supposed to represent. On a personal level, Believe in Nothing represented a really dark time in my life. I don't think anything positive comes out of being depressed or down like that. My personal life was kind of in a bad way at that time, and I think that album is a direct result of that. I know a lot of people really love that album, and I think that's great. But for me, I think the most disappointing element is the production, which I think could have been punchier, and the feelings the album conjures up. From Host through to Believe in Nothing, we didn't really kind of know where we were going. We were really in a dilemma." – Nick Holmes

In 2018, Holmes stated, regarding the remixed version of the album:

"It's no secret that we were never entirely happy with the production on this record, despite really liking the songs. It's been a long time coming, but we finally found the right moment to go back into the studio with Gomez (Orgone Studios) and play around with it. We hope you all enjoy the remixed version so you can hear how the songs were meant to sound." – Nick Holmes

== Track listing ==
All tracks written by Gregor MacKintosh and Nick Holmes

No.	Title	Length
1.	"I Am Nothing"	4:01
2.	"Mouth"	3:45
3.	"Fader"	3:57
4.	"Look at Me Now"	3:38
5.	"Illumination"	4:31
6.	"Something Real"	3:35
7.	"Divided"	3:27
8.	"Sell It to the World"	3:11
9.	"Never Again"	4:38
10.	"Control"	3:29
11.	"No Reason"	3:14
12.	"World Pretending"	4:28

2002 reissue

No.	Title	Length
13.	"Sway"	3:07

Japanese edition

No.	Title	Length
13.	"Sway"	3:07
14.	"Gone"	4:32
15.	"Waiting for God"	3:20

Koch Records reissue

No.	Title	Length
13.	"Waiting for God"	3:20
14.	"Sway"	3:07

2018 remix

No.	Title	Length
13.	"Gone"	4:30
14.	"Leave This Alone"	3:54

== Single ==
The single "Mouth" was remixed and ended up on the aforementioned single. The single has a music video.

== Personnel ==
=== Paradise Lost ===
- Nick Holmes – vocals and lyrics
- Gregor Mackintosh – lead guitar, keyboards, programming, string arrangements, and all music
- Aaron Aedy – rhythm guitar
- Steve Edmondson – bass
- Lee Morris – drums and backing vocals

=== Additional musicians on tracks 3, 7, 9 and "Gone" ===
- Sally Herbert – violin, strings
- Jacqueline Norrie – violin
- Claire Orsler – viola
- Clare Finnimore – viola
- Sophie Harris – cello
- Dinah Beamish – cello

=== Production ===
- John Fryer – engineering, programming
- Gerhard "Anyway" Wölfle – mixing
- Michael Schwabe – mastering

== Charts ==
Chart (2001)	Peak position
Austrian Albums (Ö3 Austria)	31
Finnish Albums (Suomen virallinen lista)	18
French Albums (SNEP)	48
German Albums (Offizielle Top 100)	10
Swedish Albums (Sverigetopplistan)	31
Swiss Albums (Schweizer Hitparade)	41
UK Albums (Official Charts)	144
