= Draconian Times =

Studio album by Paradise Lost
- Released: 12 June 1995
- Recorded: January–March 1995
- Studio: Great Linford Manor and Ridge Farm Studios, England
- Genre: Gothic metal; gothic rock; heavy metal
- Length: 48:59
- Label: Music for Nations, Relativity
- Producer: Simon Efemey

Paradise Lost chronology
Icon (1993)	Draconian Times (1995)	One Second (1997)

Singles from Draconian Times
- 1. "The Last Time" Released: 8 May 1995; 2. "Forever Failure" Released: 25 September 1995

Draconian Times is the fifth studio album by British gothic metal band Paradise Lost, released on 12 June 1995 through Music for Nations and Relativity Records. Two tracks from the album, "The Last Time" and "Forever Failure", were released as singles with music videos, and both charted.

The album was played in its entirety on the band's live record Draconian Times MMXI. It was also released with Shades of God and Icon in a boxed set called Original Album Classics.

A song called "Another Desire" was written during the recording of Draconian Times, but not released on the album or the reissues. Instead, it was included in the "Forever Failure" single.

== Reception ==
Professional ratings
Review scores
Source	Rating
AllMusic	4.5/5 stars
Sputnikmusic	4/5 stars
Laut.de	5/5 stars

Daevid Jehnzen of AllMusic rewarded the album a score of 4.5 out of 5, calling it a mix "between stark, oppressive goth rock and crunching heavy metal" and praising Paradise Lost's ability to "create and sustain a mood".

Ulf Kubanke of Laut.de calls the album "a perfect mix between beauty and morbidity" and also points out that the album sounds "as if Hetfield took a bite out of the album First and Last and Always".

== Track listing ==
All tracks are written by Gregor Mackintosh and Nick Holmes except where noted.

No.	Title	Length
1.	"Enchantment"	6:04
2.	"Hallowed Land"	5:02
3.	"The Last Time"	3:27
4.	"Forever Failure"	4:18
5.	"Once Solemn"	3:03
6.	"Shadowkings"	4:41
7.	"Elusive Cure"	3:21
8.	"Yearn for Change" (Mackintosh, Lee Morris, Holmes, Steve Edmondson)	4:19
9.	"Shades of God"	3:54
10.	"Hands of Reason"	3:58
11.	"I See Your Face" (Aaron Aedy, Mackintosh, Holmes)	3:17
12.	"Jaded"	3:26
Total length:		48:59

Koch Records (US) reissue
No.	Title	Length
13.	"How Soon Is Now?" (The Smiths cover)	4:34
14.	"Fear"	3:08

Japanese edition bonus tracks
No.	Title	Length
13.	"Walk Away" (The Sisters of Mercy cover)	3:24
14.	"Laid to Waste"	3:16
15.	"Master of Misrule"	3:07

Legacy Edition (2011)
No.	Title	Length
13.	"Enchantment" (1994 Demo)	5:03
14.	"Last Desire" (1994 Demo)	3:09
15.	"Forever Failure" (Live in Germany 1995)	4:21
16.	"Shadowkings" (Live in Germany 1995)	4:49
17.	"Once Solemn" (Live in Germany 1995)	3:05
18.	"Hallowed Land" (Live in Germany 1995)	5:11
19.	"The Last Time" (Live in Germany 1995)	3:40

25th Anniversary Edition (Disc 2)
No.	Title	Length
1.	"Shadowkings (BBC Live Session)"	4:36
2.	"Sweetness (BBC Live Session)"	4:16
3.	"Once Solemn (BBC Live Session)"	2:55
4.	"Yearn For Change (BBC Live Session)"	4:15
5.	"The Last Time (demo)"	3:30
6.	"Forever Failure (demo)"	4:19
7.	"Shadowkings (demo)"	5:04
8.	"I See Your Face (demo)"	3:54
9.	"Hallowed Land (demo)"	4:54
10.	"Hands of Reason (demo)"	4:26
11.	"Last Desire (demo)"	3:10
12.	"Master of Misrule (demo)"	3:18
13.	"Walk Away" (The Sisters of Mercy)	3:24

Limited Edition Commemorative Tour Pack (bonus CD)
No.	Title	Length
1.	"Embers Fire (Live)"	4:27
2.	"Daylight Torn (Live)"	7:28
3.	"True Belief (Live)"	4:24
4.	"Pity the Sadness (Live)"	5:14
5.	"As I Die (Live)"	3:38
6.	"Weeping Words (Demo)"	3:50
7.	"The Last Time (Demo)"	3:27
8.	"Walk Away" (The Sisters of Mercy cover)	3:24
9.	"Laid to Waste"	3:14
10.	"Master of Misrule"	3:07
11.	"Forever Failure (Video Edit)"	4:45

== Personnel ==
=== Band ===
- Nick Holmes – vocals and lyrics
- Gregor Mackintosh – lead guitar
- Aaron Aedy – rhythm and acoustic guitars
- Steve Edmondson – bass
- Lee Morris – drums

=== Guest musicians ===
- Andrew Holdsworth – keyboards

=== Production ===
- Simon Efemey (Zomba Management Ltd.) – production
- Pete "Pee Wee" Coleman – audio engineering, mixing
- Kevin Metcalfe (at Townhouse Studios, London) – mastering
- Holly Warburton – illustrations and photography
- Stylorouge – design and layout
- Andy Griffin, Phil Woods, Phil Luff – assisting
- Spoken Dialogue on "Forever Failure":
  - taken from "Charles Manson – The Man Who Killed the Sixties"
  - produced by Box Productions for Channel Four Television Corporation.

== Charts ==
=== Weekly charts ===
Chart (1995)	Peak position
Austrian Albums (Ö3 Austria)	21
Belgian Albums (Ultratop Flanders)	24
Belgian Albums (Ultratop Wallonia)	47
Dutch Albums (Album Top 100)	46
Finnish Albums (Suomen virallinen lista)	24
German Albums (Offizielle Top 100)	15
Scottish Albums (OCC)	30
Swedish Albums (Sverigetopplistan)	16
Swiss Albums (Schweizer Hitparade)	20
UK Albums (OCC)	16
UK Rock & Metal Albums (OCC)	2

=== Year-end charts ===
Chart (1995)	Position
German Albums (Offizielle Top 100)	91
