= One Second (Paradise Lost album) =

Studio album by Paradise Lost
- Released: 14 July 1997
- Recorded: 1996–1997
- Studios: Battery Studios (London) and Rockfield Studios (Wales)
- Genres: Gothic rock; electronic rock; synth-pop
- Length: 50:00
- Label: Music for Nations
- Producer: Ulf "Sank" Sandqvist

Paradise Lost chronology
Draconian Times (1995)	One Second (1997)	Host (1999)

Professional ratings
Review scores
Source	Rating
AllMusic	4/5 stars
Kerrang!	5/5 stars
Metal Hammer	4/5 stars

One Second is the sixth studio album by the British gothic metal band Paradise Lost. It marks the group's transition from a gothic metal act to a more electronic direction. It is the bestselling record of their career, and it enabled the band to sign with the German branch of the major label EMI. One Second is Paradise Lost's first album recorded in digital format.

A 20th anniversary edition was released on 14 July 2017, which contained the original album remastered by Jaime Gomez Arellano and an additional disc with audio from a concert at Shepherd's Bush Empire on 26 January 1998, part of the tour in support of the original album release. The concert was previously released as part of the Evolve DVD, and this was its first CD release.

In 2020, it was named one of the 20 best metal albums of 1997 by Metal Hammer magazine.

== Musical style ==
About the musical style of One Second, Nick Holmes told Decibel:

"After we recorded Draconian Times and toured it non-stop, we just felt like doing something else—something a bit less up-tempo and darker, also Greg bought a keyboard! The result was One Second. It was greeted on the whole very positively, but quite a departure from Draconian Times and pissed off a few people naturally. However, it's very much a part of the band's journey—like every album has been—and we enjoyed making it."

== Track listing ==
All tracks by Nick Holmes and Gregor Mackintosh except as indicated.

No.	Title	Length
1.	"One Second"	3:32
2.	"Say Just Words"	4:02
3.	"Lydia"	3:32
4.	"Mercy"	4:24
5.	"Soul Courageous"	3:01
6.	"Another Day"	4:44
7.	"The Sufferer"	4:29
8.	"This Cold Life"	4:21
9.	"Blood of Another"	4:01
10.	"Disappear"	4:29
11.	"Sane"	4:00
12.	"Take Me Down" (some editions include an extra minute of silence at the end)	5:25/6:25
Total length:		50:00

Metal Mind Productions and Music for Nations reissue

No.	Title	Length
13.	"I Despair"	3:54
Total length:		54:58

The End Records reissue

No.	Title	Writer	Length
13.	"How Soon Is Now?" (The Smiths cover)	Johnny Marr, Morrissey	4:36
14.	"Albino Flogged in Black" (Stillborn cover)	Stillborn	6:30

Pony Canyon Inc. and Jive Records reissue

No.	Title	Writer	Length
13.	"I Despair"		3:54
14.	"Cruel One"		3:22
15.	"How Soon Is Now?" (The Smiths cover)	Johnny Marr, Morrissey	4:36
16.	"Albino Flogged in Black" (Stillborn cover)	Stillborn	6:30

20th Anniversary Edition reissue (Music for Nations), second disc, live at Shepherd's Bush Empire, London on 26 January 1998

No.	Title	Length
13.	"Say Just Words" (originally from the album One Second)	4:00
14.	"Hallowed Land" (originally from the album Draconian Times)	5:10
15.	"Blood of Another" (originally from the album One Second)	3:49
16.	"True Belief" (originally from the album Icon)	4:31
17.	"Disappear" (originally from the album One Second)	4:35
18.	"Lydia" (originally from the album One Second)	3:44
19.	"Dying Freedom" (originally from the album Icon)	3:31
20.	"Mercy" (originally from the album One Second)	4:19
21.	"Shadowkings" (originally from the album Draconian Times)	4:41
22.	"The Sufferer" (originally from the album One Second)	4:40
23.	"Remembrance" (originally from the album Icon)	3:25
24.	"Forever Failure" (originally from the album Draconian Times)	4:32
25.	"Soul Courageous" (originally from the album One Second)	2:58
26.	"One Second" (originally from the album One Second)	3:50
27.	"This Cold Life" (originally from the album One Second)	3:55
28.	"Embers Fire" (originally from the album Icon)	5:44
29.	"As I Die" (originally from the album Shades of God)	3:51
30.	"The Last Time" (originally from the album Draconian Times)	3:50
Total length:		74:46

== Credits ==
- Nick Holmes – vocals
- Gregor Mackintosh – lead guitar, keyboards
- Aaron Aedy – rhythm guitar
- Steve Edmondson – bass guitar
- Lee Morris – drums, backing vocals

=== Liner notes ===
- Recorded at Battery Studios, London, and Rockfield Studios, Monmouth, Wales
- Produced, engineered and mastered by Sank for Toytown Productions
- Mixed by Stefan Glaumann and Sank at MVG Studios
- Additional backing vocals by Greg & Sank
- Additional engineering by Richard Flack
- Sampling, programming and keyboards by Sank and Gregor Mackintosh
- Violin/strings by Stephan Brisland-Ferner
- Arranged by Sank, Stefan and Gregor Mackintosh
- Cover photo concept idea by Ross Halfin
- Band photograph by David Tonge
- Other photography by Susan Andrews for Refocus
- Design and layout by Design Ministry

== Charts ==
Chart (1997)	Peak position
Austrian Albums (Ö3 Austria)	10
Belgian Albums (Ultratop Wallonia)	44
Dutch Albums (Album Top 100)	39
Finnish Albums (Suomen virallinen lista)	7
French Albums (SNEP)	21
German Albums (Offizielle Top 100)	8
Hungarian Albums (MAHASZ)	15
Norwegian Albums (VG-lista)	25
Scottish Albums (Official Charts)	45
Swedish Albums (Sverigetopplistan)	5
Swiss Albums (Schweizer Hitparade)	40
UK Albums (Official Charts)	31
UK Rock & Metal Albums (Official Charts)	3

== Release history ==
Region	Date	Label	Format	Catalog
United Kingdom	14 July 1997	Music for Nations	CD	CDMFN 222
United Kingdom	1997	Music for Nations	LP, Gatefold	MFN 222
United Kingdom	1997	Music for Nations	CD	CDMFNX 222
United Kingdom & United States	1997	Music for Nations	CD	01241-4616-2
Japan	18 July 1997	Pony Canyon Inc.	CD	PCCY-01142
Poland	1997	Metal Mind Productions	Cassette	MASS 0450
Europe	1997	Music for Nations	CD	82876 829172
United States	1997	Jive Records	?	?
Russia	14 May 2007	Sony BMG	CD	88697 10516 2
Poland	28 January 2008	Metal Mind Productions	CD	MASS CD DG 1098
United Kingdom	2011	Peaceville Records	CD	VILELP333
United States	28 August 2012	The End Records	CD	TE231-2
Worldwide	14 July 2017	Music for Nations	2CD, 2LP, DD	88985411092
