= Ascension (Paradise Lost album) =

2025 studio album by Paradise Lost

Studio album by Paradise Lost
- Released: 19 September 2025
- Genre: Gothic metal, death-doom
- Length: 51:02
- Label: Nuclear Blast
- Producer: Gregor Mackintosh

Paradise Lost chronology
Icon 30 (2023)	Ascension (2025)

Singles from Ascension
- 1. "Silence Like the Grave" Released: 6 June 2025; 2. "Serpent on the Cross" Released: 11 July 2025; 3. "Tyrants Serenade" Released: 15 August 2025

Ascension is the seventeenth studio album by British gothic metal band Paradise Lost, released on 19 September 2025 through Nuclear Blast. It is the first studio album of fully new material by Paradise Lost since Obsidian (2020), marking the longest gap between studio albums in the band's career. It is also their last album to feature drummer Guido Montanarini, who appeared on Icon 30 (2023), and left Paradise Lost in May 2025.

Professional ratings
Review scores
Source	Rating
AllMusic	4/5 stars
Metal Hammer	3.5/5 stars

== Background ==
On 24 March 2023, Paradise Lost announced on their Facebook page that touring drummer Guido Montanarini had become an official member of the band.

In a November 2023 interview with Portugal's Metal Global, Nick Holmes said that Paradise Lost had been working on new material for the follow-up to Obsidian: "Hopefully at the beginning of next year, we can have a few months downtime so we can actually get working more on the album. But... I think we've got a few songs done; we need to review them. So, yeah, we'll hopefully write an album next year, anyway. Whether it's gonna be recorded [next year], I don't know, but hopefully at least written".

In May 2025, prior to the release of Ascension, Montanarini became the sixth drummer to leave Paradise Lost; he was replaced by Jeff Singer, who had previously drummed for Paradise Lost during the 2000s. On 6 June 2025, the band announced the release date of Ascension, while also releasing the album's lead single entitled "Silence Like the Grave".

== Track listing ==
No.	Title	Length
1.	"Serpent on the Cross"	6:12
2.	"Tyrants Serenade"	4:20
3.	"Salvation"	7:07
4.	"Silence Like the Grave"	4:46
5.	"Lay a Wreath Upon the World"	4:51
6.	"Diluvium"	5:47
7.	"Savage Days"	3:54
8.	"Sirens"	4:46
9.	"Deceivers"	3:37
10.	"The Precipice"	5:42
Total length:		51:02

Bonus tracks
No.	Title	Length
11.	"This Stark Town"	5:38
12.	"A Life Unknown"	4:10
Total length:		60:01

== Personnel ==
=== Paradise Lost ===
- Nick Holmes – vocals
- Gregor Mackintosh – lead guitar
- Aaron Aedy – rhythm guitar
- Steve Edmondson – bass
- Guido Zima Montanarini – drums

== Charts ==
Chart performance
Chart (2025)	Peak position
Australian Albums (ARIA)	74
Austrian Albums (Ö3 Austria)	5
Belgian Albums (Ultratop Flanders)	20
Belgian Albums (Ultratop Wallonia)	21
Dutch Albums (Album Top 100)	29
French Albums (SNEP)	58
French Rock & Metal Albums (SNEP)	5
Finnish Albums (Suomen virallinen lista)	7
German Albums (Offizielle Top 100)	6
German Rock & Metal Albums (Offizielle Top 100)	3
Hungarian Physical Albums (MAHASZ)	38
Italian Albums (FIMI)	83
Japanese Western Albums (Oricon)	23
Polish Albums (ZPAV)	4
Portuguese Albums (AFP)	68
Scottish Albums (OCC)	8
Spanish Albums (PROMUSICAE)	39
Swedish Hard Rock Albums (Sverigetopplistan)	2
Swedish Physical Albums (Sverigetopplistan)	3
Swiss Albums (Schweizer Hitparade)	11
UK Albums (OCC)	54
UK Independent Albums (OCC)	3
UK Rock & Metal Albums (OCC)	2
US Top Current Album Sales (Billboard)	45
