= Host (Paradise Lost album) =

Studio album by Paradise Lost
- Released: 24 May 1999
- Recorded: September 1998 – February 1999
- Genres: Electronic rock; dark wave; gothic rock; synthpop
- Length: 53:00
- Label: EMI
- Producer: Steve Lyon

Paradise Lost chronology
One Second (1997)	Host (1999)	Believe in Nothing (2001)

Singles from Host
- 1. "So Much Is Lost" Released: April 26, 1999; 2. "Permanent Solution" Released: September 13, 1999

Professional ratings
Review scores
Source	Rating
AllMusic	3/5 stars
Cutting Edge	4/5 stars
Kerrang!	3/5 stars
Laut.de	4/5 stars
Q	3/5 stars
Rock Hard	8.5/10

Host is the seventh studio album by British gothic metal band Paradise Lost, released on 24 May 1999 through EMI Group Limited.

== Style ==
Following One Second, Host saw the band moving further away from their previous metal sound to something more akin to a melancholic style of synth-pop incorporating downtempo, left field, and trance electronic styles. Songs were constructed primarily of programmed drums and synthesizer melodies, with simple, rock-style guitar added for choruses. Vocalist Nick Holmes resolved to simple melodies with his clean singing style, often doubled and harmonized; the resultant material resembled crossover acts like Psykosonik and electronic band Depeche Mode.

== Release and promotion ==
The singles "So Much Is Lost" and "Permanent Solution" both have music videos released; in an interview, Holmes and Mackintosh explained that the videos were higher budget compared to other videos they made.

Due to an injury, Gregor Mackintosh often played keyboards instead of guitar while touring the album with his guitar technician Milton "Milly" Evans playing his guitar parts.

== Reception and legacy ==
While the album was critically well received, opinion about it continues to be split. Holmes commented on this album in 2007, stating:

"From Host through to Believe in Nothing, we didn't really kind of know where we were going. We were really in a dilemma."

Aedy said Host is the "darkest" Paradise Lost album, but noted the band was not happy with the production. The album was remastered and re-released in 2018.

The album eventually served as the inspiration of Holmes' and Mackintosh's side-project Host; in the press release about the formation, Mackintosh noted that "we always stood by Host as an album". He also relayed a story about the album's historic trajectory:

[...] we did the show at the festival in Norway, in Bergen and there's a lot of black metal guys there from the old days. I was talking to the guys and they said they liked the Host album, but they weren't allowed to like it at that time and now they are allowed to like it.

== Track listing ==
No.	Title	Length
1.	"So Much Is Lost"	4:16
2.	"Nothing Sacred"	4:02
3.	"In All Honesty"	4:02
4.	"Harbour"	4:23
5.	"Ordinary Days"	3:29
6.	"It's Too Late"	4:44
7.	"Permanent Solution"	3:17
8.	"Behind the Grey"	3:13
9.	"Wreck"	4:41
10.	"Made the Same"	3:34
11.	"Deep"	4:00
12.	"Year of Summer"	4:16
13.	"Host"	5:12
Total length:		53:00

Japanese edition bonus tracks
No.	Title	Length
14.	"So Much Is Lost (Lost in Space Mix)"	6:22
15.	"Languish" (instrumental)	4:08
16.	"So Much Is Lost (String Version)"	4:18
Total length:		67:48

== Personnel ==
=== Paradise Lost ===
- Nick Holmes – lead vocals and lyrics
- Gregor Mackintosh – lead guitar (tracks 1–11, 13–16), keyboards, programming, string arrangements (1, 2, 4, 6, 10, 13), and all music
- Aaron Aedy – rhythm guitar, lead guitar on "Year of Summer"
- Steve Edmondson – bass
- Lee Morris – drums, backing vocals

=== Additional personnel ===
==== Cellists and other string arrangements ====
- Audrey Riley – strings arrangements and cello (1, 4, 10)
- Sally Herbert – string arrangements (2, 6, 13)
- Dinah Beamish – cello (2, 6, 13)

==== Violists ====
- Sue Dench – tracks 1, 4, 10
- Claire Orster – tracks 2, 6, 13

==== Backing vocals ====
- Shereena Smith – chanting on "Harbour", backing vocals (4, 6, 13)

==== Production ====
- Howie Weinberg – mastering
- Steve Lyon – engineering, mixing, programming
- Matt Cullen – engineer assistance

==== Album design ====
- Paul Postle – photography
- Stylorouge – design, art direction

==== Violinists ====
On tracks 1, 4, 10

- Chris Tombling
- Leo Payne

On tracks 2, 6, 13

- Anne Stephenson
- Gini Ball
- Jocelyn Pook
- Julia Singleton
- Sally Herbert

== Charts ==
Chart (1999)	Peak position
Austrian Albums (Ö3 Austria)	33
Finnish Albums (Suomen virallinen lista)	7
French Albums (SNEP)	67
German Albums (Offizielle Top 100)	4
Norwegian Albums (VG-lista)	38
Scottish Albums (Official Charts)	96
Swedish Albums (Sverigetopplistan)	19
UK Albums (Official Charts)	61
UK Rock & Metal Albums (Official Charts)	3
