= Symbol of Life =

Studio album by Paradise Lost
- Released: 21 October 2002
- Recorded: June–July 2002
- Genres: Gothic metal; gothic rock
- Length: 52:56
- Labels: GUN (Europe); Koch (United States)
- Producer: Rhys Fulber

Paradise Lost chronology
Believe in Nothing (2001)	Symbol of Life (2002)	Paradise Lost (2005)

Singles from Symbol of Life
- 1. "Isolate" Released: 2002; 2. "Erased" Released: 18 November 2002

Symbol of Life is the ninth studio album by British gothic metal band Paradise Lost. This album was the final release featuring drummer Lee Morris.

Two songs which were written and left out for this album are "I Can Hate You" and "Deus". Neither have been released on any of the reissues of this album, but can be found on the digipak version of the single "Erased"; the aforementioned single has a music video.

== Production ==
The album marks a departure by the band from their synth-based approach and returning to a much heavier sound, although not abandoning the keyboards altogether. It was produced by Front Line Assembly's Rhys Fulber; the band sought out Fulber to re-establish themselves, and were planning to continue a more electronic sound, but Fulber pushed the band to veer back towards the band's gothic metal roots again.

== Track listing ==
All tracks are written by Gregor MacKintosh and Nick Holmes.

No.	Title	Length
1.	"Isolate"	3:43
2.	"Erased"	3:31
3.	"Two Worlds"	3:29
4.	"Pray Nightfall"	4:11
5.	"Primal"	4:23
6.	"Perfect Mask"	3:46
7.	"Mystify"	3:49
8.	"No Celebration"	3:45
9.	"Self-Obsessed"	3:07
10.	"Symbol of Life"	3:55
11.	"Channel for the Pain"	3:53

Limited edition

No.	Title	Writer(s)	Length
12.	"Xavier" (Dead Can Dance cover)	Lisa Gerrard, Brendan Perry	6:04
13.	"Smalltown Boy" (Bronski Beat cover)	Steve Bronski, Jimmy Somerville, Larry Steinbachek	5:20

== Reception ==
Professional ratings
Review scores
Source	Rating
AllMusic	3/5 stars

Chart (2002)	Peak position
French Albums (SNEP)	61
German Albums (Offizielle Top 100)	16
Swedish Albums (Sverigetopplistan)	56
Swiss Albums (Schweizer Hitparade)	77
UK Albums (OCC)	166

== Credits ==
=== Paradise Lost ===
- Nick Holmes – vocals, lyrics
- Gregor Mackintosh – lead guitar, keyboards, programming, music
- Aaron Aedy – rhythm guitar
- Steve Edmondson – bass guitar
- Lee Morris – drums, backing vocals

=== Additional personnel ===
- Published by: Zomba Music Publishers Ltd.
- Additional Keyboards and programming by: Rhys Fulber
- Recorded and mixed by: Greg Reely
- Additional keyboards by: Jamie Muhoberac (tracks 1, 2, 4, 11)
- Strings arrangements and Piano: Chris Elliott (tracks 8, 10)
- Additional vocals: Lee Dorian (track 2) courtesy of Dreamcatcher Records, Joanna Stevens (tracks 2, 5, 7) and Devin Townsend (tracks 3, 13) courtesy of Century Media Records
- Assistant engineers: Ewan Davies and Will Bartle (Chapel Studios) and Bart (Dreamcatcher Studios)
- Recorded at: Chapel Studios, Lincolnshire, during June–July 2002 and Dreamcatcher Recording Studios, Bradford, 2002
- Additional recording by: Carmen Rizzo at Studio 775, Los Angeles, California, US
- Mixed at: The Green Jacket, Richmond, Canada
- Additional digital editing by: Chris Potter
- Mastered by: Kai Blankenberg at Skyline Studios, Düsseldorf, Germany
- Artwork by: [sleeve design] – Dirk Rudolph
- Photography [band, screens]: Olaf Heine
- Photography [front]: Nick Veasey
