= The Plague Within =

Studio album by Paradise Lost
- Released: 1 June 2015
- Recorded: Orgone Studios in London
- Genre: Death-doom; gothic metal
- Length: 50:27
- Label: Century Media
- Producer: Jaime Gomez Arellano

Paradise Lost chronology
Tragic Illusion 25 (The Rarities) (2013)	The Plague Within (2015)	Medusa (2017)

Professional ratings
Review scores
Source	Rating
About.com	4.5/5 stars
Metal Hammer	(4.3/5)
Metal Storm	(4.3/5)
Revolver	4/5 stars
Sputnikmusic	(3.8/5)
The Quietus	positive

The Plague Within is the fourteenth studio album by British gothic metal band Paradise Lost, released on 1 June 2015 in Europe and 2 June 2015 in North America through Century Media Records. This album shows the band returning to their death-doom roots, mixed with elements of the gothic metal sound they are most known for.

== Track listing ==
All lyrics are written by Nick Holmes; all music is composed by Greg Mackintosh.

No.	Title	Length
1.	"No Hope in Sight"	4:54
2.	"Terminal"	4:28
3.	"An Eternity of Lies"	5:58
4.	"Punishment Through Time"	5:13
5.	"Beneath Broken Earth"	6:09
6.	"Sacrifice the Flame"	4:42
7.	"Victim of the Past"	4:29
8.	"Flesh from Bone"	4:19
9.	"Cry Out"	4:31
10.	"Return to the Sun"	5:44

USA Exclusive Digipak
No.	Title	Additional notes	Length
11.	"Victim of the Past" (orchestra version)	live recording	5:13

Deluxe edition bonus disc
No.	Title	Additional notes	Length
1.	"Fear of Silence"		3:59
2.	"Never Look Away"		5:16
3.	"Victim of the Past" (orchestral version)	live recording	5:13

== Personnel ==
=== Paradise Lost ===
- Nick Holmes – vocals
- Greg Mackintosh – lead guitar
- Aaron Aedy – rhythm guitar
- Steve Edmondson – bass
- Adrian Erlandsson – drums

=== Production ===
- Jaime Gomez Arellano – production

== Charts ==
Chart (2015)	Peak position
Austrian Albums (Ö3 Austria)	14
Belgian Albums (Ultratop Flanders)	21
Belgian Albums (Ultratop Wallonia)	39
Dutch Albums (Album Top 100)	28
French Albums (SNEP)	53
Finnish Albums (Suomen virallinen lista)	4
German Albums (Offizielle Top 100)	7
Japanese Albums (Oricon)	209
Portuguese Albums (AFP)	24
Scottish Albums (OCC)	48
Spanish Albums (PROMUSICAE)	50
Swedish Albums (Sverigetopplistan)	49
Swiss Albums (Schweizer Hitparade)	21
UK Albums (OCC)	51
UK Rock & Metal Albums (OCC)	3
US Top Hard Rock Albums (Billboard)	23
US Heatseekers Albums (Billboard)	15
