= As I Die =

EP by Paradise Lost
- Released: 7 February 1993
- Genre: Death-doom, gothic metal
- Length: 19:38
- Label: Music for Nations
- Producer: Simon Efemey

Paradise Lost chronology
Shades of God (1992)	As I Die (1993)	Icon (1993)

Professional ratings
Review scores
Source	Rating
AllMusic	3/5 stars

As I Die is the first EP by British gothic metal band Paradise Lost. The title track was covered by Finnish symphonic death metal band Eternal Tears of Sorrow as a bonus track on their album A Virgin and a Whore.

== Track listing ==
1. "As I Die" – 3:51
2. "Rape of Virtue" – 4:48
3. "Death Walks Behind You" – 6:30 (cover of an Atomic Rooster song)
4. "Eternal" (recorded live in Amsterdam 1992 on the Shades of God European Tour) – 4:29
