= Obsidian (Paradise Lost album) =

Studio album by Paradise Lost
- Released: 15 May 2020
- Genre: Gothic metal, death-doom
- Length: 45:35
- Label: Nuclear Blast
- Producer: Jaime Gomez Arellano

Paradise Lost chronology
Medusa (2017)	Obsidian (2020)	Icon 30 (2023)

Singles from Obsidian
- 1. "Fall from Grace" Released: 20 March 2020; 2. "Ghosts" Released: 24 April 2020

Professional ratings
Aggregate scores
Source	Rating
Metacritic	90/100
Review scores
Source	Rating
AllMusic	4/5 stars
Classic Rock	4/5 stars
Consequence of Sound	A
Kerrang!	4/5 stars
Metal Hammer	4/5 stars
Metal Storm	8/10
Sputnikmusic	4.8/5

Obsidian is the sixteenth studio album by British gothic metal band Paradise Lost, released on 15 May 2020 through Nuclear Blast Records.

Music videos were released for the songs "Darker Thoughts" and "Fall from Grace". Metal Hammer named it as the 11th best metal album of 2020. Obsidian is the band's last album to feature Waltteri Väyrynen on drums, who went on to join Opeth in 2022.

== Track listing ==
No.	Title	Length
1.	"Darker Thoughts"	5:46
2.	"Fall from Grace"	5:42
3.	"Ghosts"	4:35
4.	"The Devil Embraced"	6:08
5.	"Forsaken"	4:30
6.	"Serenity"	4:46
7.	"Ending Days"	4:36
8.	"Hope Dies Young"	4:02
9.	"Ravenghast"	5:30
Total length:		45:35

Deluxe edition bonus tracks
No.	Title	Length
10.	"Hear the Night"	5:34
11.	"Defiler"	4:45
Total length:		55:54

== Personnel ==
=== Paradise Lost ===
- Nick Holmes – vocals
- Gregor Mackintosh – lead guitar
- Aaron Aedy – rhythm guitar
- Steve Edmondson – bass
- Waltteri Väyrynen – drums

=== Other personnel ===
- Alicia Nurho – violin (1 & 7)
- Heather Mackintosh – backing vocals (8)
- Jaime Gomez Arellano – recording, mixing, and mastering
- Federico De Luca – layout
- Adrian Baxter – artwork

== Charts ==
Chart performance for Obsidian
Chart (2020)	Peak position
Austrian Albums (Ö3 Austria)	5
Belgian Albums (Ultratop Flanders)	11
Belgian Albums (Ultratop Wallonia)	16
Dutch Albums (Album Top 100)	31
Finnish Albums (Suomen virallinen lista)	2
French Albums (SNEP)	105
German Albums (Offizielle Top 100)	2
Hungarian Albums (MAHASZ)	8
Italian Albums (FIMI)	59
Japanese Albums (Oricon)	187
Polish Albums (ZPAV)	5
Portuguese Albums (AFP)	31
Swiss Albums (Schweizer Hitparade)	4
UK Albums (OCC)	32
UK Rock & Metal Albums (OCC)	1
