= Medusa (Paradise Lost album) =

Studio album by Paradise Lost
- Released: 1 September 2017
- Genres: Death-doom; gothic metal
- Length: 42:41; 51:18 (with bonus tracks); 57:03 (Japan edition)
- Label: Nuclear Blast
- Producers: Jaime Gomez Arellano; Paradise Lost

Paradise Lost chronology
| The Plague Within (2015) | Medusa (2017) | Obsidian (2020) |

Singles from Medusa
- 1. "The Longest Winter" Released: 7 July 2017; 2. "Blood & Chaos" Released: 4 August 2017

Medusa is the fifteenth studio album by British gothic metal band Paradise Lost, released on 1 September 2017 through Nuclear Blast Records.

== Composition ==
=== Musical style ===
According to guitarist Greg Mackintosh the album is "slower, sludgier and more doom-filled than ever before". He also considered it "eight riff-laden monster tracks of sheer Northern misery". Meanwhile, front man Nick Holmes described the record as "...definitely our heaviest album; the heaviest we’ve done. The idea was to keep it simple but dark and heavy, and I think we’ve achieved that."

=== Lyrical themes ===
Regarding the album title, Holmes commented that "...when Gregor writes songs, he gives them working titles, so he called one song Medusa. There’s no real meaning to it. It’s not something I would use in a song and wouldn’t use as a title either. I liked the thought though. When we were kids, Medusa was the scariest character we knew. As I looked into it, I found a lot of different metaphorical meanings that she represents. There was one sentence I read which was ‘Attempts to avoid looking into her eyes represent avoiding the ostensibly depressing reality that the universe is meaningless’, which made a lot of sense to me. To me, this is what Medusa stood for. There are many different interpretations, but this was mine."

With the track "No Passage for the Dead" Holmes expressed his skeptical attitude towards the belief in the afterlife, calling it "a ridiculous man-made notion, [...] initially a theory invented to profit clever individuals, aimed at weak, frightened people." He conceded that not sharing this belief is not "a nice thought", but on the other hand could "make you appreciate the time you have, and live life to the fullest."

== Release and promotion ==
In support of the album's release, the band toured Europe during the Fall of 2017, with support from Pallbearer and Sinistro. In December, an Australian tour followed (their first in over six years), while also gradually announcing a UK tour in February, multiple festival slots for the Summer of 2018 and a Central/South American tour in September.

== Critical reception ==
Professional ratings
Review scores
| Source | Rating |
|---|---|
| Blabbermouth | 8.5/10 |
| Loudwire | positive |
| Metal Hammer | 8/10 |
| Metal Storm | 8.7/10 |
| Sputnikmusic | 3.5/5 stars |
| Team Rock | 4/5 stars |
| Terrorizer | 8.5/10 |

Medusa received high critical praise. Andy Walmsley of Terrorizer gave the album eight and a half points out of ten and considered it "one of the darkest, heaviest, and doomiest albums of their career", with "some of the most gloriously grim riffs, cruelly catchy melodies, and spine-tingling vocals (both harsh and clean) that the band have ever recorded." Dom Lawson, comparing Medusa to its predecessor album The Plague Within in his positive review in Metal Hammer, thought that "to a certain extent Medusa is simply more of the same. Only slower and heavier." He concluded: "This is still the sound of noble veterans driving the dark heart of their music forwards and onto new terrain. It's just that a dark and scary world needs music that speaks the truth about mankind's accursed frailty. Few do it better, or with more monstrous power, than this."

=== Accolades ===
Best of the year (2017) lists
| Publisher | Accolade | Rank |
|---|---|---|
| Decibel | Top 40 Albums of 2017 | 1 |
| Loudwire | Best Metal Albums of 2017 | 14 |
| Metal Hammer | Top 100 Albums of 2017 | 9 |
| Rolling Stone | 20 Best Metal Albums of 2017 | 12 |
| Stereogum | The Best Metal Albums of 2017 | 24 |
| WhatCulture | Best Rock and Heavy Metal Albums of 2017 | 14 |

== Track listing ==
| No. | Title | Length |
|---|---|---|
| 1. | "Fearless Sky" | 8:30 |
| 2. | "Gods of Ancient" | 5:50 |
| 3. | "From the Gallows" | 3:42 |
| 4. | "The Longest Winter" | 4:31 |
| 5. | "Medusa" | 6:20 |
| 6. | "No Passage for the Dead" | 4:16 |
| 7. | "Blood & Chaos" | 3:51 |
| 8. | "Until the Grave" | 5:41 |
| Total length: | | 42:41 |

Digital edition and limited edition digipak
| No. | Title | Length |
|---|---|---|
| 9. | "Shrines" | 3:59 |
| 10. | "Symbolic Virtue" | 4:38 |
| Total length: | | 51:18 |

Japanese bonus track
| No. | Title | Original album | Length |
|---|---|---|---|
| 11. | "Frozen Illusion" | Lost Paradise | 5:45 |
| Total length: | | | 57:03 |

== Personnel ==
=== Paradise Lost ===
- Nick Holmes – vocals, lyrics
- Greg Mackintosh – lead guitars, keyboards, music
- Aaron Aedy – rhythm guitar
- Steve Edmondson – bass
- Waltteri Väyrynen – drums

=== Additional musicians ===
- Steve Crobar – backing vocals (2)
- Heather Mackintosh – backing vocals (6)

== Charts ==
| Chart (2017) | Peak position |
|---|---|
| Austrian Albums (Ö3 Austria) | 15 |
| Belgian Albums (Ultratop Flanders) | 20 |
| Belgian Albums (Ultratop Wallonia) | 25 |
| Czech Albums (ČNS IFPI) | 17 |
| Dutch Albums (Album Top 100) | 70 |
| Finnish Albums (Suomen virallinen lista) | 7 |
| French Albums (SNEP) | 85 |
| German Albums (Offizielle Top 100) | 6 |
| Hungarian Albums (MAHASZ) | 24 |
| Japanese Albums (Oricon) | 229 |
| Polish Albums (ZPAV) | 8 |
| Scottish Albums (Official Charts) | 30 |
| Spanish Albums (PROMUSICAE) | 30 |
| Swedish Albums (Sverigetopplistan) | 38 |
| Swiss Albums (Schweizer Hitparade) | 14 |
| UK Albums (Official Charts) | 56 |
| US Heatseekers Albums (Billboard) | 7 |
