= Tragic Illusion 25 (The Rarities) =

- Album cover art by Valnoir

Compilation album by Paradise Lost
- Released: 5 November 2013
- Recorded: 2007–2013
- Genre: Doom metal, gothic metal, symphonic metal, death-doom
- Length: 59:32
- Label: Century Media

Paradise Lost chronology
Tragic Idol (2012)	Tragic Illusion 25 (The Rarities) (2013)	The Plague Within (2015)

Professional ratings
Review scores
Source	Rating
Jukebox:Metal	4/5 stars

Tragic Illusion 25 (The Rarities) is the fifth compilation album by British gothic metal band Paradise Lost, released on 5 November 2013 through Century Media Records. The compilation album contains a previously unreleased track "Loneliness Remains" as well as two cover tracks, two remixes, and two re-recordings.

== Track listing ==
No.	Title	Writer(s)	Album	Length
1.	"Loneliness Remains"		new song	4:56
2.	"Never Take Me Alive" (Spear of Destiny cover)	Kirk Brandon	Tragic Idol	4:42
3.	"Ending Through Changes"		Tragic Idol	4:07
4.	"The Last Fallen Saviour"		"The Last Fallen Saviour" (7" vinyl, single, 2012)	3:39
5.	"Last Regret" (Lost in Prague Orchestra Mix)		Faith Divides Us - Death Unites Us	4:19
6.	"Faith Divides Us - Death Unites Us" (Lost in Prague Orchestra Mix)		Faith Divides Us - Death Unites Us	4:16
7.	"Cardinal Zero"		Faith Divides Us - Death Unites Us	4:26
8.	"Back on Disaster"		Faith Divides Us - Death Unites Us	4:12
9.	"Sons of Perdition"		In Requiem	4:11
10.	"Godless"		"The Enemy" (single, 2007)	2:15
11.	"Missing" (Everything but the Girl cover)		In Requiem	4:27
12.	"Silent in Heart"		In Requiem	3:21
13.	"Gothic 2013"		Gothic	5:13
14.	"Our Saviour 2013"		Lost Paradise	5:28
Total length:				59:32

== Credits ==
=== Paradise Lost ===
- Nick Holmes – vocals
- Greg Mackintosh – lead guitars
- Aaron Aedy – rhythm guitar
- Steve Edmondson – bass guitar
- Adrian Erlandsson - drums (1–4, 13, 14)

=== Additional musicians ===
- Peter Damin - drums (5–8)
- Jeff Singer – drums (9–12)

== Charts ==
Charts (2013)	Peak position
Belgian Albums (Ultratop Wallonia)	120
