= Vallenfyre =

British death metal band

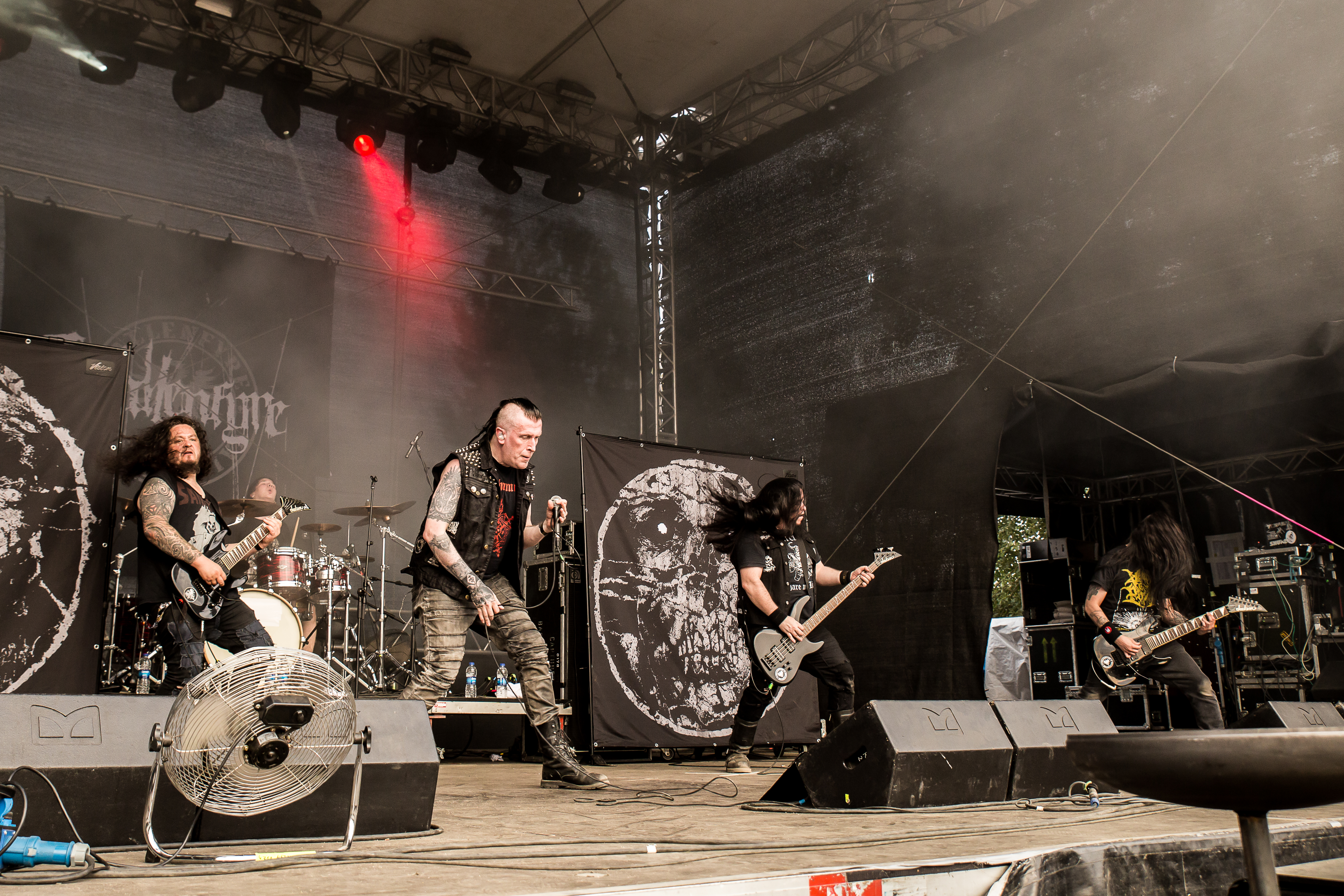
- Vallenfyre performing at With Full Force 2018

Background information
- Origin: Halifax, West Yorkshire, England
- Genres: Death metal, death-doom, crust punk, grindcore
- Years active: 2010–2018
- Labels: Century Media
- Members: Gregor Mackintosh; Hamish Hamilton Glencross; Waltteri Väyrynen; Sam Kelly-Wallace; Chris Casket
- Website: vallenfyre.co.uk

Vallenfyre was a British death metal band founded in Halifax, West Yorkshire, England, as a side project by Paradise Lost's chief songwriter and lead guitarist Gregor Mackintosh in 2010 as tribute to his father's death in December 2009.

Vallenfyre took part in the Decibel Magazine Tour 2015, alongside At the Gates, Converge, and Pallbearer.

== Members ==
Vallenfyre, live at With Full Force 2018

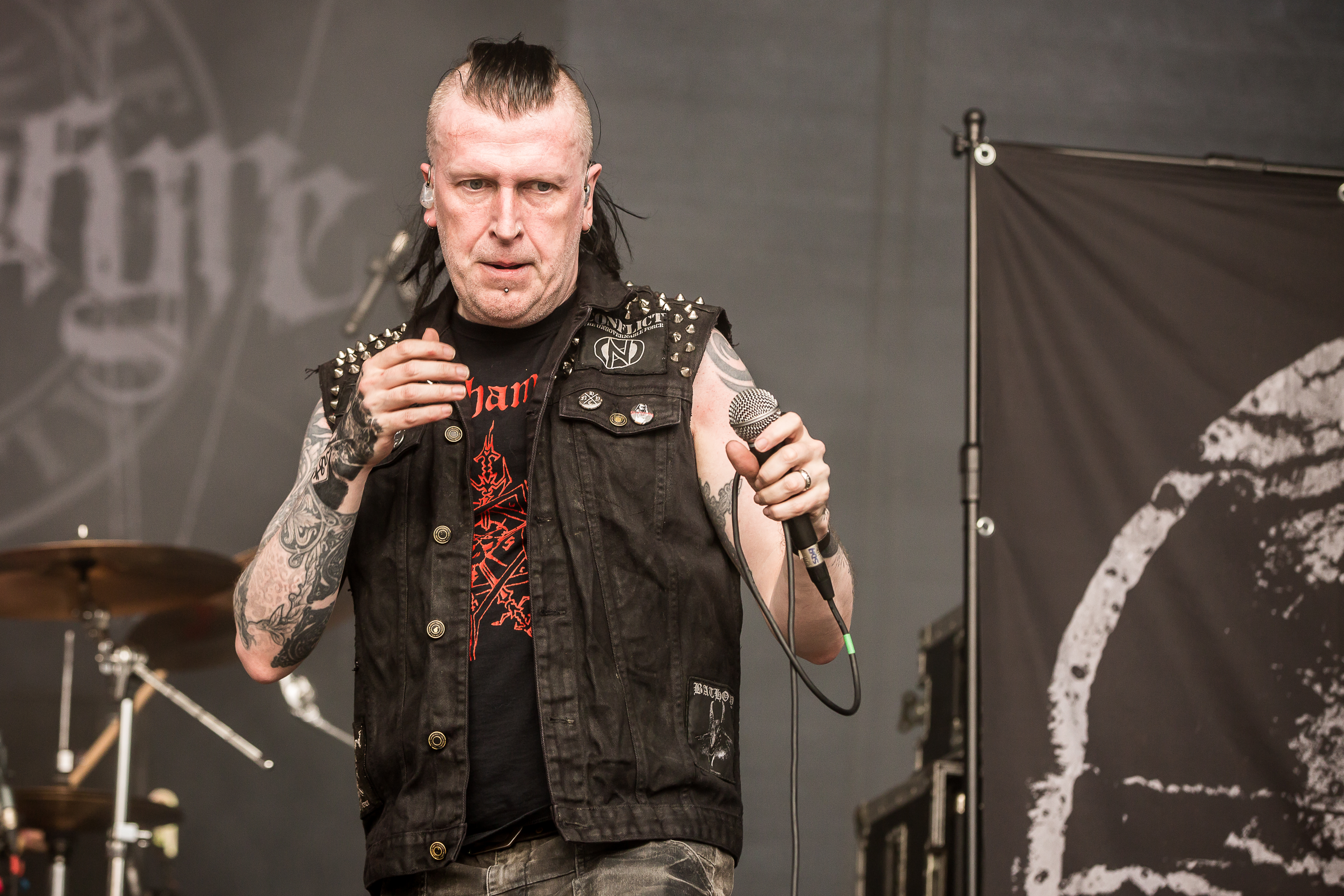
Singer Gregor Mackintosh

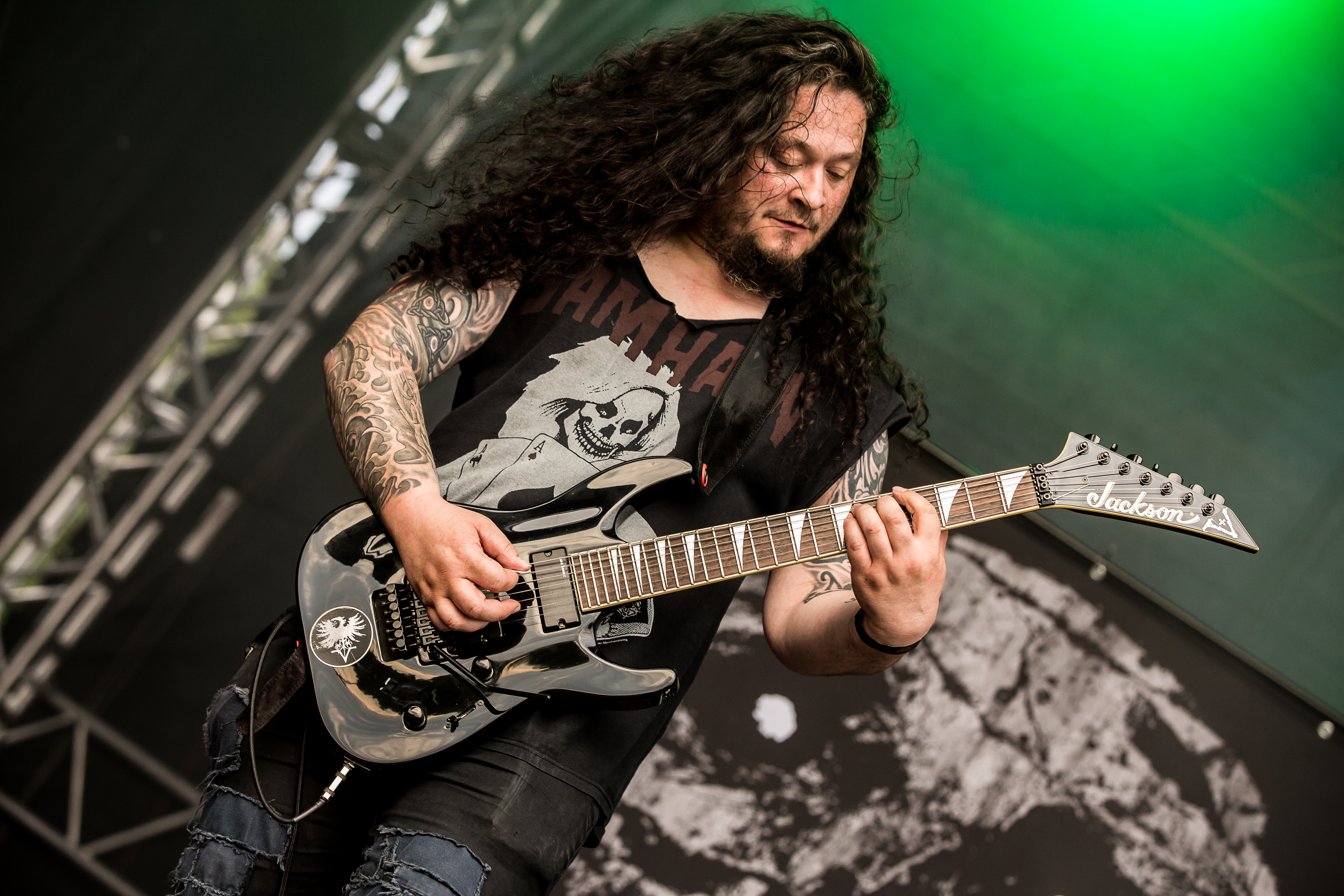
Lead guitarist Hamish Glencross

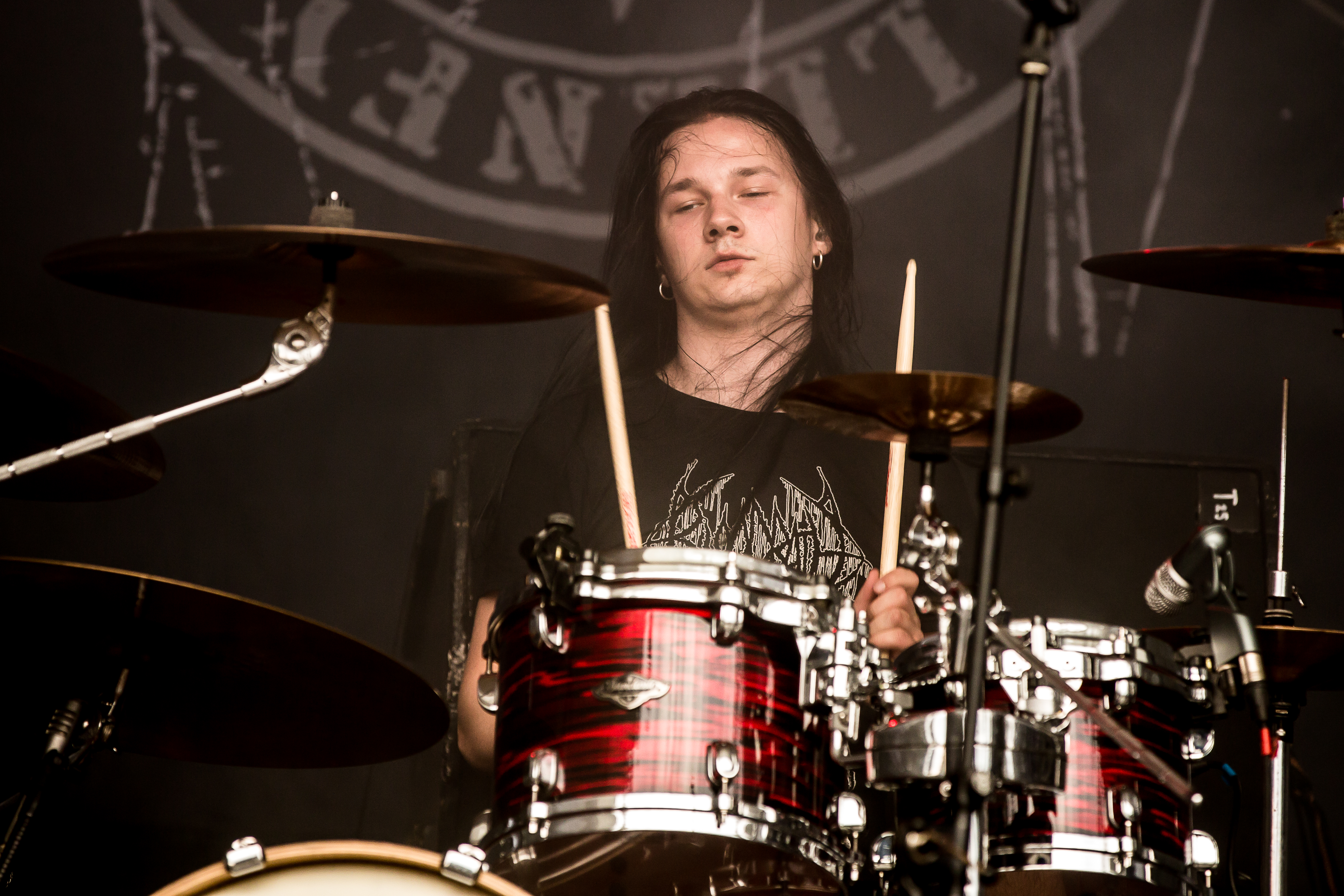
Drummer Waltteri Väyrynen

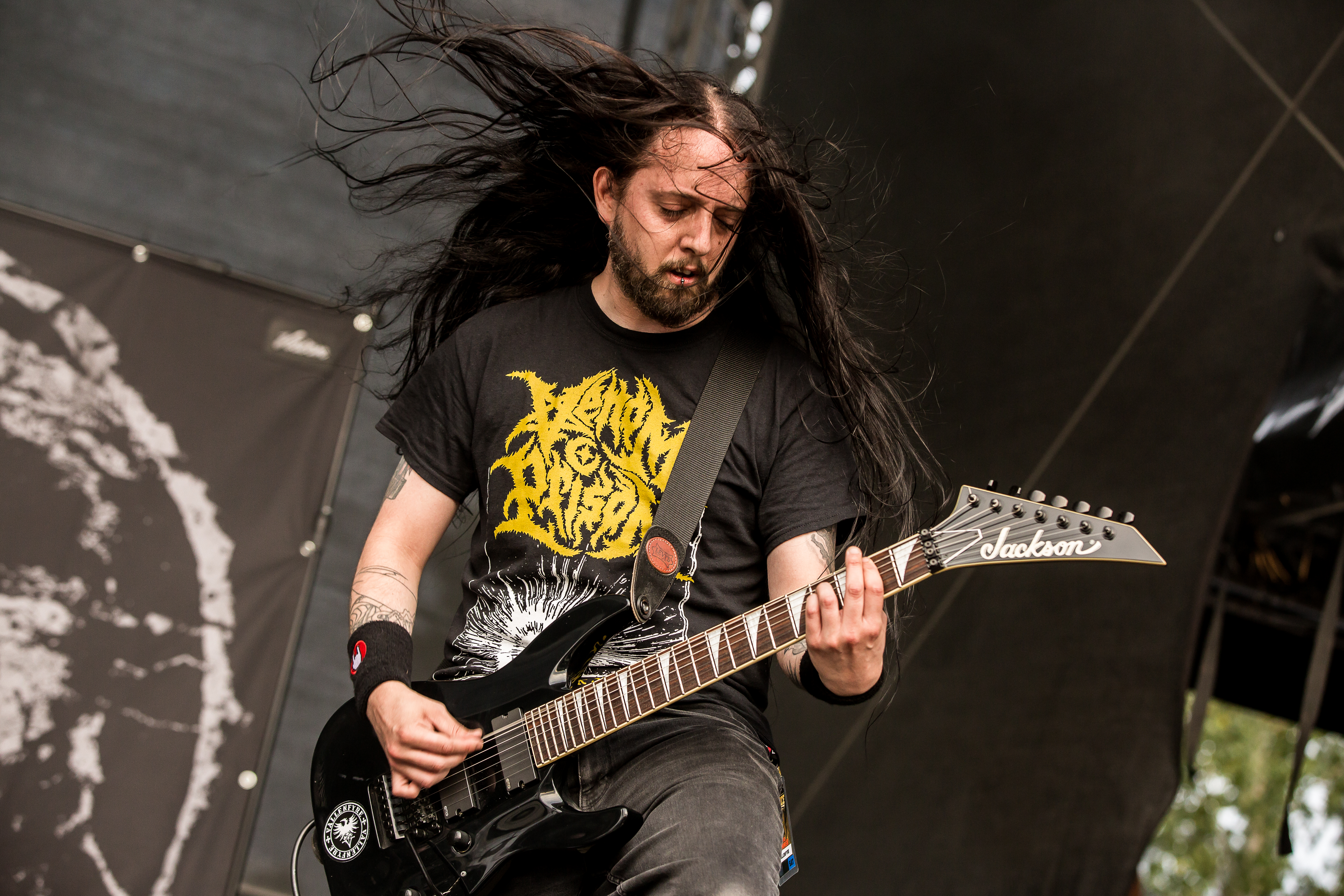
Rhythm guitarist Sam Kelly-Wallace

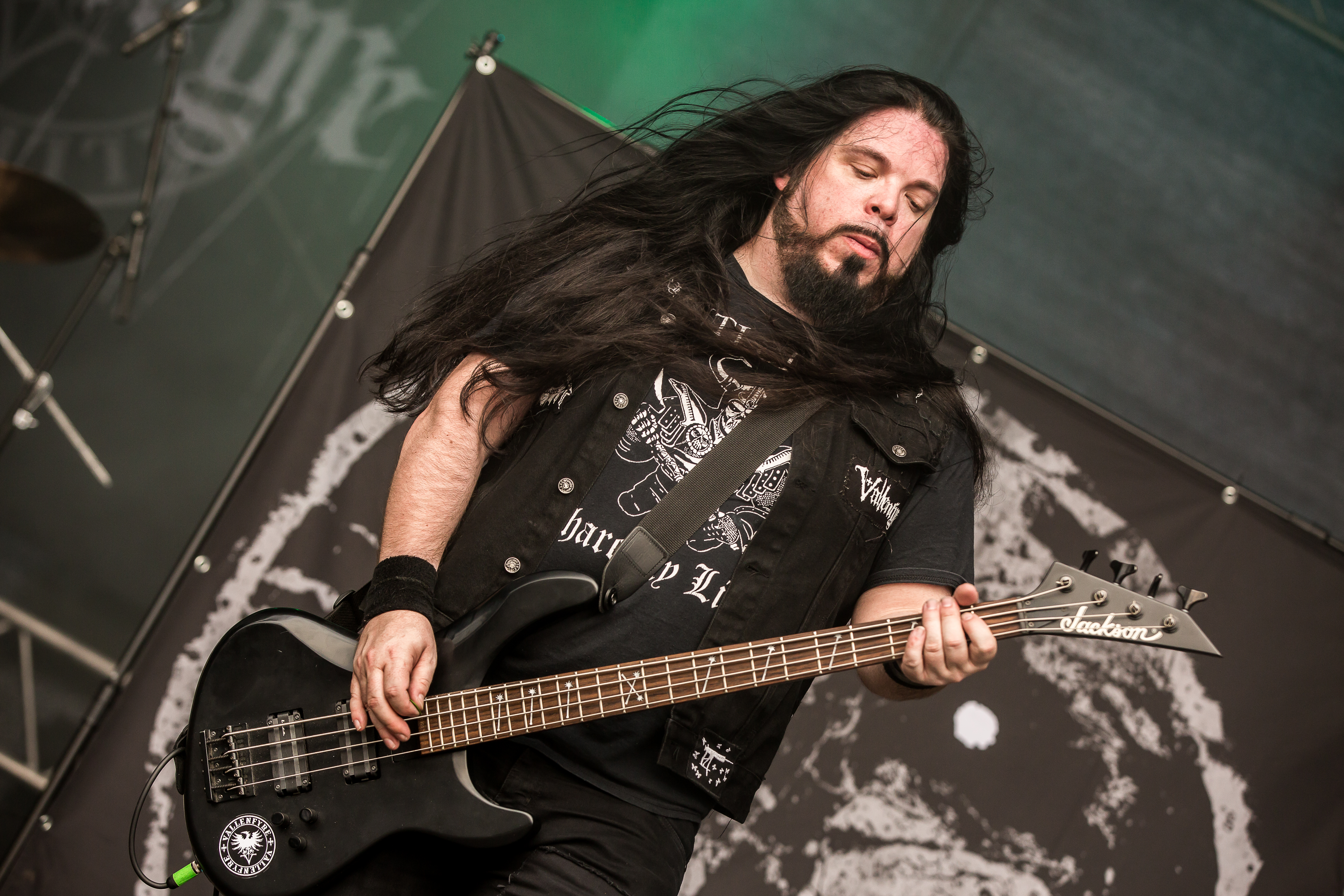
Bassist Chris Casket

=== Final lineup ===
- Gregor Mackintosh – vocals (2010–2018)
- Hamish Glencross – lead guitar (2010–2018)
- Waltteri Väyrynen – drums (2014–2018)

==== Live musicians ====
- Sam Kelly-Wallace – bass guitar (2013), rhythm guitar (2014–2018)
- Chris Casket – bass guitar (2016–2018)

=== Past members ===
- Mully – rhythm guitar (2010–2013)
- Adrian Erlandsson – drums (2010–2014)
- Scoot – bass guitar (2010–2013, 2013–2015, 2015–2016)
- Alejandro Corredor – bass guitar (2015)

== Discography ==
=== Albums ===
Year	Album	Peak positions	
Year	Album	FIN	UK
2011	A Fragile King	–	
2014	Splinters	43	
2017	Fear Those Who Fear Him		

=== EPs ===
Year	EP	Peak positions	
Year	EP	FIN	UK
2011	Desecration (EP)	–	–
2015	The Last Of Our Kind (EP)	–	–

=== Music videos ===
Year	Song	Director
2011	"Cathedrals of Dread"	Unknown
2014	"Splinters"	Unknown
2017	"Kill All Your Masters"	Unknown
2017	"The Merciless Tide"	Ash Pears
