= Lost Paradise (album) =

Studio album by Paradise Lost
- Released: 5 February 1990
- Recorded: December 1989
- Studio: The Academy (West Yorkshire)
- Genre: Death-doom; death metal
- Length: 40:49
- Label: Peaceville
- Producer: Paul "Hammy" Halmshaw

Paradise Lost chronology
Lost Paradise (1990)	Gothic (1991)

Paradise Lost discography chronology
Frozen Illusion (1989)	Lost Paradise (1990)	In Dub (1990)

Professional ratings
Review scores
Source	Rating
Allmusic	2/5 stars
Sputnikmusic	2/5 stars

Lost Paradise is the debut studio album by British gothic metal band Paradise Lost. Released in February 1990 by Peaceville Records, it features the band's early death-doom style. The album was re-issued in 2003 and included three bonus tracks.

== Background ==
The tracks "Our Saviour" and "Frozen Illusion" were rerecorded in other Paradise Lost albums Tragic Illusion 25 and Medusa.

== Music ==
The tracks on Lost Paradise have been characterized as "grinding, de-tuned anthems of woe topped with death metal-style guttural vocals."

== Reception ==
Eduardo Rivadavia of AllMusic said: "On this, their modest debut, Paradise Lost helped define the rules of doom/death metal. [...] Yet, even as they were laying down the blueprint, Paradise Lost was already reaching for realms unknown to their then-amateurish abilities and latent promise. [...] In retrospect, Lost Paradise serves as a welcome rediscovery for serious fans, but casual metalheads likely won't see anything worthwhile here."

== Track listing ==
All songs written by Gregor MacKintosh and Nick Holmes

No.	Title	Length
1.	"Intro"	2:40
2.	"Deadly Inner Sense"	4:36
3.	"Paradise Lost"	5:30
4.	"Our Saviour"	5:07
5.	"Rotting Misery"	5:16
6.	"Frozen Illusion"	5:20
7.	"Breeding Fear"	4:14
8.	"Lost Paradise"	2:08
9.	"Internal Torment II"	5:54
Total length:		40:49

Orion reissue bonus tracks
No.	Title	Length
10.	"Rotting Misery (Doom Dub)"	4:48
11.	"Breeding Fear (Demolition Dub)"	6:08
Total length:		51:45

Reissue bonus tracks
No.	Title	Length
10.	"Eternal (live)"	3:56
11.	"Gothic (mix)"	4:41
12.	"The Painless (mix)"	3:57
Total length:		53:23

== Personnel ==
=== Paradise Lost ===
- Nick Holmes – vocals
- Gregor Mackintosh – lead guitar
- Aaron Aedy – rhythm guitar
- Stephen Edmondson – bass
- Matthew Archer – drums

=== Production ===
- Duncan Fegredo – cover art
- Paul "Hammy" Halmshaw – producer
- Pat Grogan – engineering
- Porl Medlock – photography
- Kay Field – female vocals

=== Credits ===
The album was recorded at The Academy studio in 1989. It was engineered by Pat Grogan and produced by Hammy. Female vocals on "Breeding Fear" were performed by Kay Field. Kay Field appears courtesy of Major Records. The song "Internal Torment II" also appears on the Peaceville Records compilation Vile Vibes.

All Songs composed by Holmes/Mackintosh and Published by Vile Music (Zomba Music Publishers Ltd.). The cover illustration was done by Duncan Fegredo of Exploding Head Designs in 1989. Photography was done by Porl A. Medlock.
