= Aaron Aedy =

British guitarist

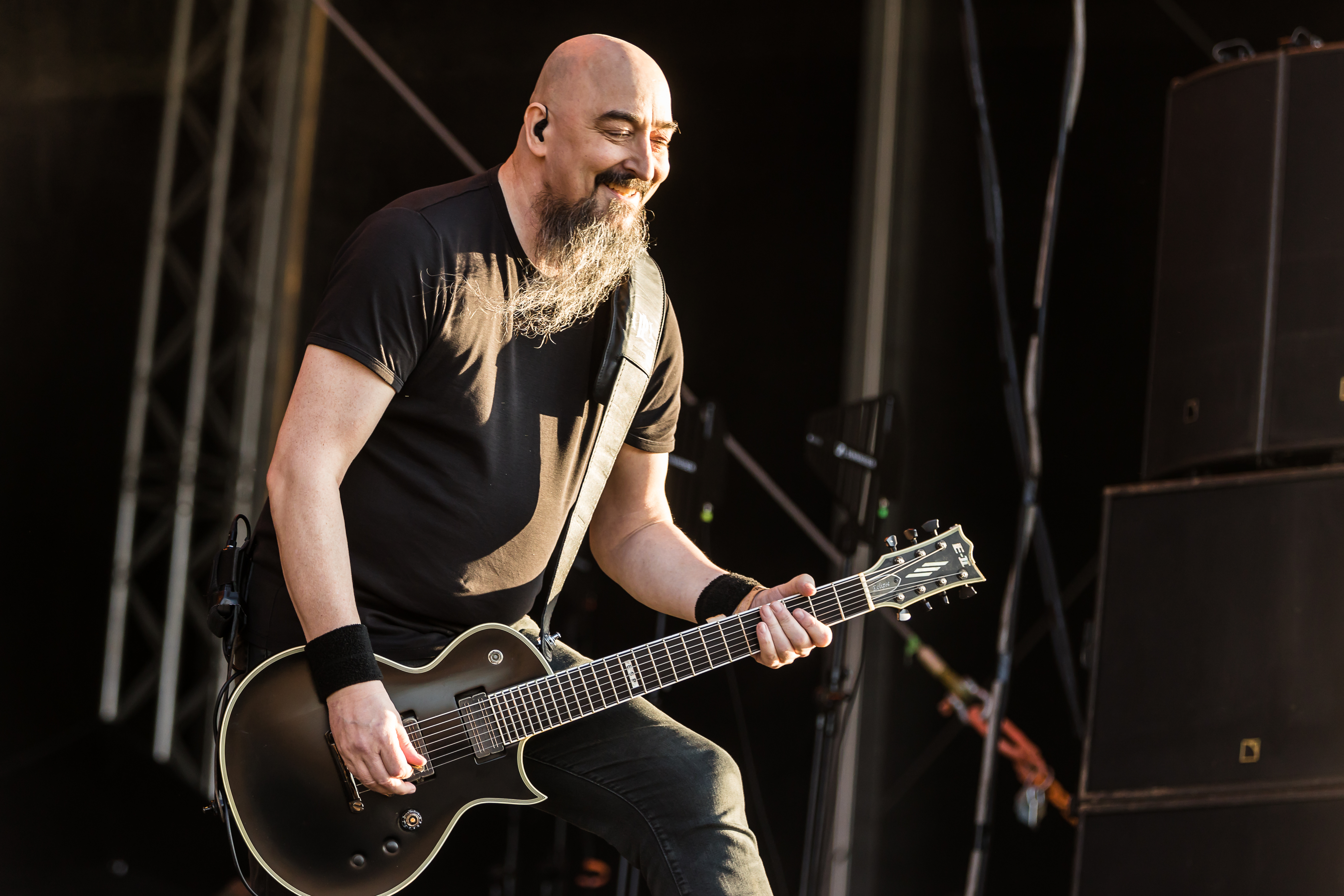
- Aedy performing in 2026

Background information
- Born: Anthony Edward Aaron Aedy; 19 December 1969 (age 56)
- Genres: Gothic metal, doom metal, death-doom
- Occupation: Guitarist
- Years active: 1988–present
- Member of: Paradise Lost

Anthony Edward Aaron Aedy (born 19 December 1969) is an English guitarist who is best known as the rhythm guitarist of the gothic metal band Paradise Lost. He founded the band in 1988 alongside Stephen Edmondson, Gregor Mackintosh and Nick Holmes. Outside from playing the rhythm guitar, sometimes he plays acoustic guitar on some albums such as Shades of God and Draconian Times.

Just like his bandmate Gregor Mackintosh, he is left-handed, but has always played right-handed guitars because they are cheaper than left-handed guitars.

He has also remixed the compilation of German industrial metal band Die Krupps titled The Final Remixes.
