= Shades of God =

Studio album by Paradise Lost
- Released: 14 July 1992
- Recorded: March–April 1992
- Studio: Longhome Studios, Northamptonshire, England
- Genre: Death-doom; gothic metal
- Length: 52:56
- Label: Music for Nations
- Producer: Simon Efemey

Paradise Lost chronology
Gothic (1991)	Shades of God (1992)	Icon (1993)

Professional ratings
Review scores
Source	Rating
Allmusic	4/5 stars

Shades of God is the third studio album by British gothic metal band Paradise Lost, released on 14 July 1992 through Music for Nations. It retains the heavy instrumentation and growled vocals characteristic of the band's previous death-doom efforts, and also shows the beginning of the band's transition to a more melodic, gothic metal sound heard on the follow-up album Icon.

== Track listing ==
All songs written by Nick Holmes and Greg Mackintosh.

No.	Title	Length
1.	"Mortals Watch the Day"	5:12
2.	"Crying for Eternity"	7:05
3.	"Embraced"	4:29
4.	"Daylight Torn"	7:53
5.	"Pity the Sadness"	5:05
6.	"No Forgiveness"	7:37
7.	"Your Hand in Mine"	7:08
8.	"The Word Made Flesh"	4:41
9.	"As I Die" (missing in vinyl edition)	3:46
Total length:		52:56

Japanese edition bonus tracks
No.	Title	Length
10.	"Rape of Virtue"	4:48
11.	"Death Walks Behind You" (Atomic Rooster cover)	6:30
12.	"Eternal" (live)	4:29
Total length:		68:43

== Personnel ==
- Nick Holmes – vocals
- Matthew Archer – drums
- Stephen Edmondson – bass
- Aaron Aedy – guitars
- Gregor Mackintosh – guitars

=== Guest musicians ===
- Sarah Marrion – vocals
- Robert John Godfrey – keyboards

=== Production ===
- George Chin – photography
- Dave McKean – cover art, design, illustrations
- Simon Efemey – engineering, producer, mixing

== Charts ==
Chart (1992)	Peak position
Dutch Albums (Album Top 100)	79
