= Paradise Lost (band) =

British gothic metal band

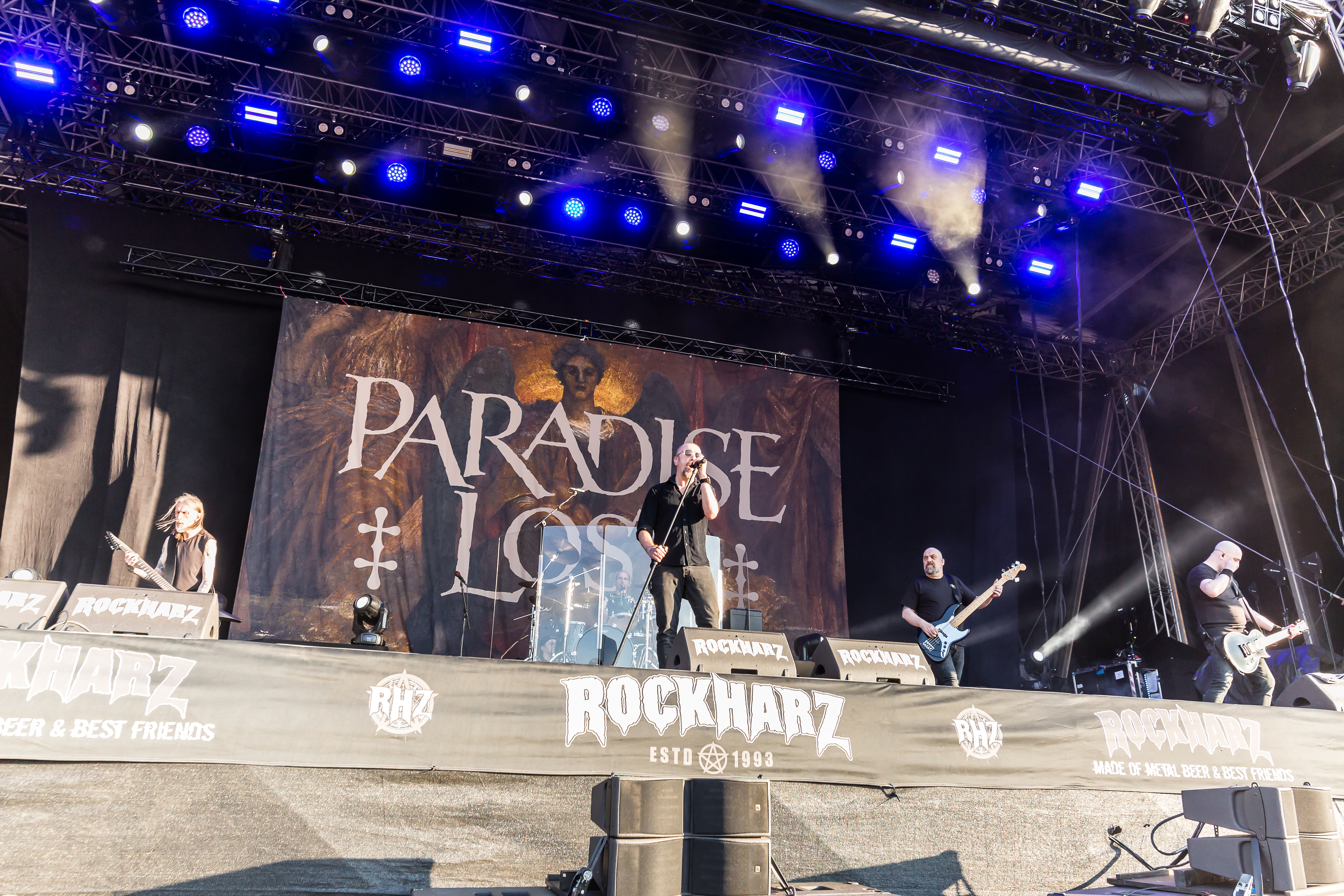
- Paradise Lost at Rockharz 2026

Background information
- Origin: Halifax, West Yorkshire, England
- Genres: Gothic metal; death-doom; doom metal
- Years active: 1988–present
- Labels: Century Media; Music for Nations; Koch; GUN; Peaceville; EMI Electrola; Metal Blade; Nuclear Blast
- Members: Aaron Aedy; Steve Edmondson; Nick Holmes; Gregor Mackintosh; Jeff Singer
- Past members: Matthew Archer; Lee Morris; Adrian Erlandsson; Waltteri Väyrynen; Guido Montanarini
- Website: paradiselost.co.uk

Paradise Lost are a British gothic metal band. Formed in Halifax, West Yorkshire, in 1988, they are considered pioneers of death-doom and the main influence on gothic metal. As of 2005, Paradise Lost have sold over two million albums worldwide.

Their line-up has remained stable, consisting of singer Nick Holmes, guitarists Greg Mackintosh and Aaron Aedy, and bassist Steve Edmondson. Holmes and Mackintosh are the principal composers, writing almost all of the band's songs. The band have only changed drummers.

== History ==
=== Early years and Peaceville Records (1988–1991) ===
After their formation in 1988, Paradise Lost released three cassette demos, Paradise Lost, Frozen Illusion, and Plains of Desolation, before signing to Peaceville Records in 1989. They recorded their debut album, Lost Paradise, at Academy Music Studio in December of that year. The album was released in February 1990.

In November 1990, Paradise Lost returned to Academy Music Studio to record their second album, Gothic, released in March 1991. The band moved away from the death/doom of previous releases, adding keyboards and female vocal accompaniments.

=== Music for Nations (1992–1998) ===
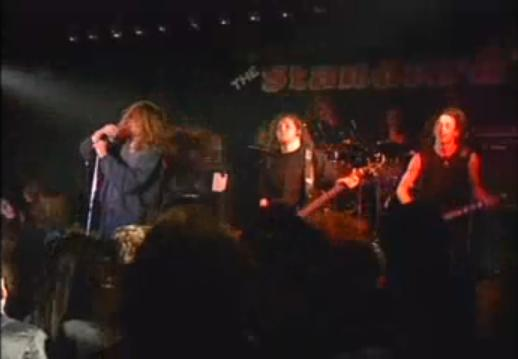
Paradise Lost performing in 1991

Paradise Lost left Peaceville, signed to Music for Nations, and released Shades of God in July 1992. The band's approach continued to evolve with this album, evidenced by the addition of quieter passages, the softening of vocalist Nick Holmes's death grunt, and Gregor Mackintosh's acoustic guitar. The album contained the song "As I Die", later released as a single/EP.

In the summer of 1993, the band recorded their fourth album, Icon, released in September of the same year. The band continued to develop their sound away from doom and towards the dynamics and sound of "As I Die" from their previous album. On Icon, Holmes abandoned his death grunt and started using a "James Hetfield-style bark". After this album, in December 1994, original member Matthew Archer quit and was replaced with drummer Lee Morris; Archer went on to become a television director.

The band entered the studio in January 1995 to record their fifth and most successful album, Draconian Times, released in June 1995. Mackintosh said about Draconian Times, "that it's the album by which everything else we do gets judged. Rightly so, as it's the backbone of our career and sound". The album charted in the Top 20 album chart in a number of countries including the UK and Germany.

Following the success of Draconian Times, and after four years of touring, the band tired of their signature sound and experimented with Depeche Mode-esque synth-pop and electronica. This new direction shaped their next album, One Second, released in 1997, epitomised by lead single "Say Just Words". The album was one of the band's most successful releases, particularly in Northern Europe, cracking the German, Swedish, and Finnish top ten charts.

=== EMI (1999–2001) ===
The band moved to EMI Electrola in Germany for its next album, Host, released in 1999, on which they continued to experiment, appearing to shed their metal roots. While this album alienated their traditional fanbase in the UK, it was their highest-charting album in Germany, entering at number 4 on the Album Chart.

On the next album, 2001's Believe in Nothing, Paradise Lost continued this synth direction, but EMI forced them to add rock elements. Due to the loss of creative control, Mackintosh said that the album "doesn't really exist for him".

=== GUN Records (2002–2005) ===
In May 2002, the band signed to GUN Records, and on the following album, Symbol of Life, the band's metallic roots resurfaced. The band worked with producer Rhys Fulber to reestablish their metal sound. The album included guest musicians Devin Townsend, Jamie Muhoberac, and Lee Dorrian.

In March 2004, Lee Morris left the band due to "personal and musical differences" and was replaced with Jeff Singer.

Paradise Lost released Paradise Lost, their tenth album, in 2005, on GUN Records.

=== Century Media (2006–2016) ===
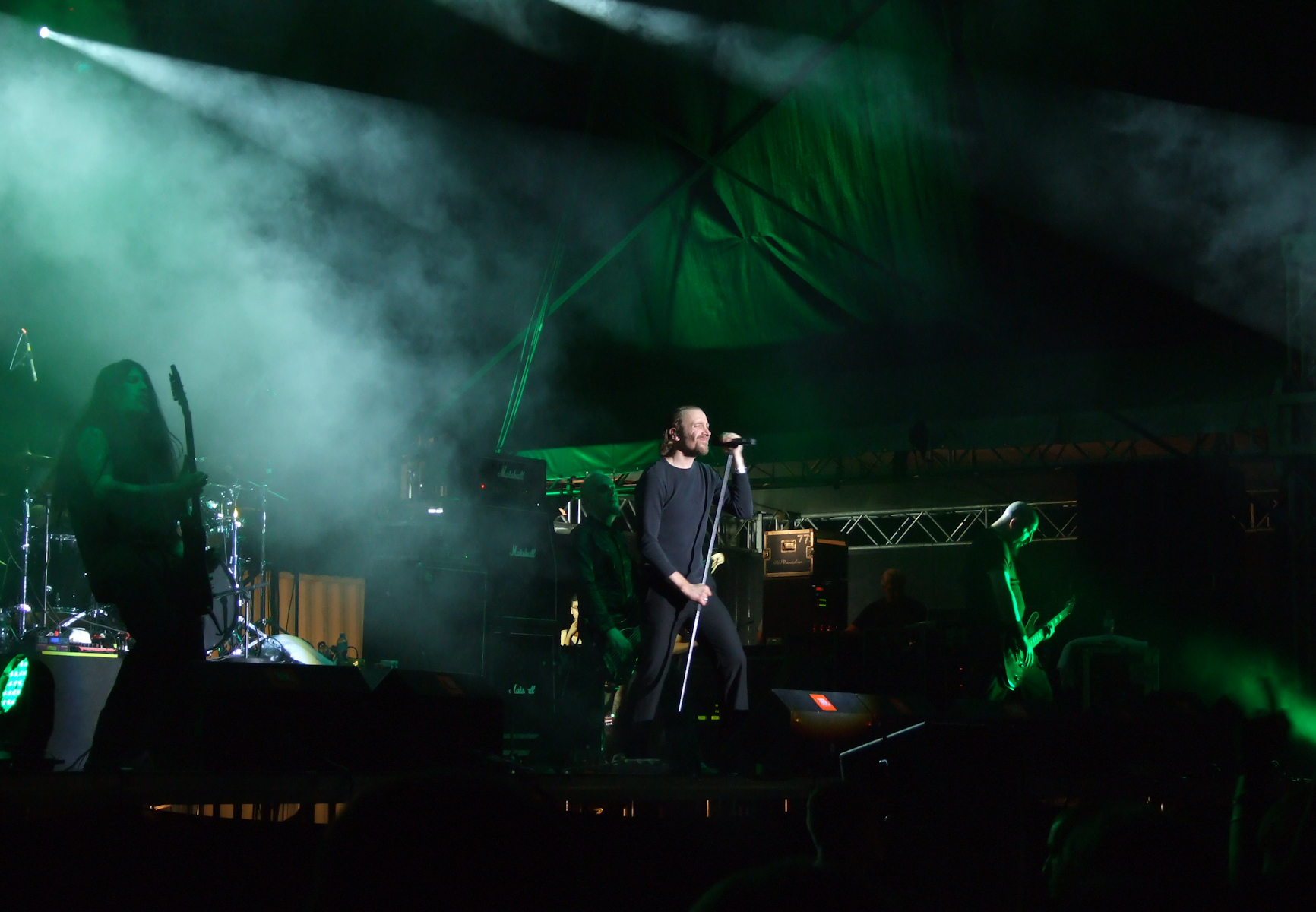
Paradise Lost at Kavarna Rock Fest in Bulgaria, 2011

The eleventh album, In Requiem, was released in the spring of 2007 on Century Media. It was generally well received and highly rated by critics and fans, pleased to see the band returning to their heavier, gothic metal sound similar to Draconian Times. The full-length was preceded by the single "The Enemy." On the single, Singer was listed as a permanent band member. In a recent video interview, Mackintosh and Holmes revealed that Singer had auditioned for the band when Archer left, but they chose Morris because Singer "had a pink drumkit".

In November 2007, Century Media released the DVD Over the Madness, which documents Paradise Lost's impact on gothic metal and provides insight into the band's mindset and inner workings. Disc 2 includes further interviews, rehearsal footage, plus backstage and memorabilia sections.

On 13 August 2008, drummer Jeff Singer announced his departure from the band on the Paradise Lost official website. He wanted to be with his family, had an upcoming job, and the then-upcoming South American tour would interfere with that. As a result, Paradise Lost cancelled the South American tour dates that they had planned. Soon after, on 28 August 2008, the Paradise Lost official website announced that the cancelled South American tour had been reconfirmed and Mark Heron from Oceansize would take over on drums.

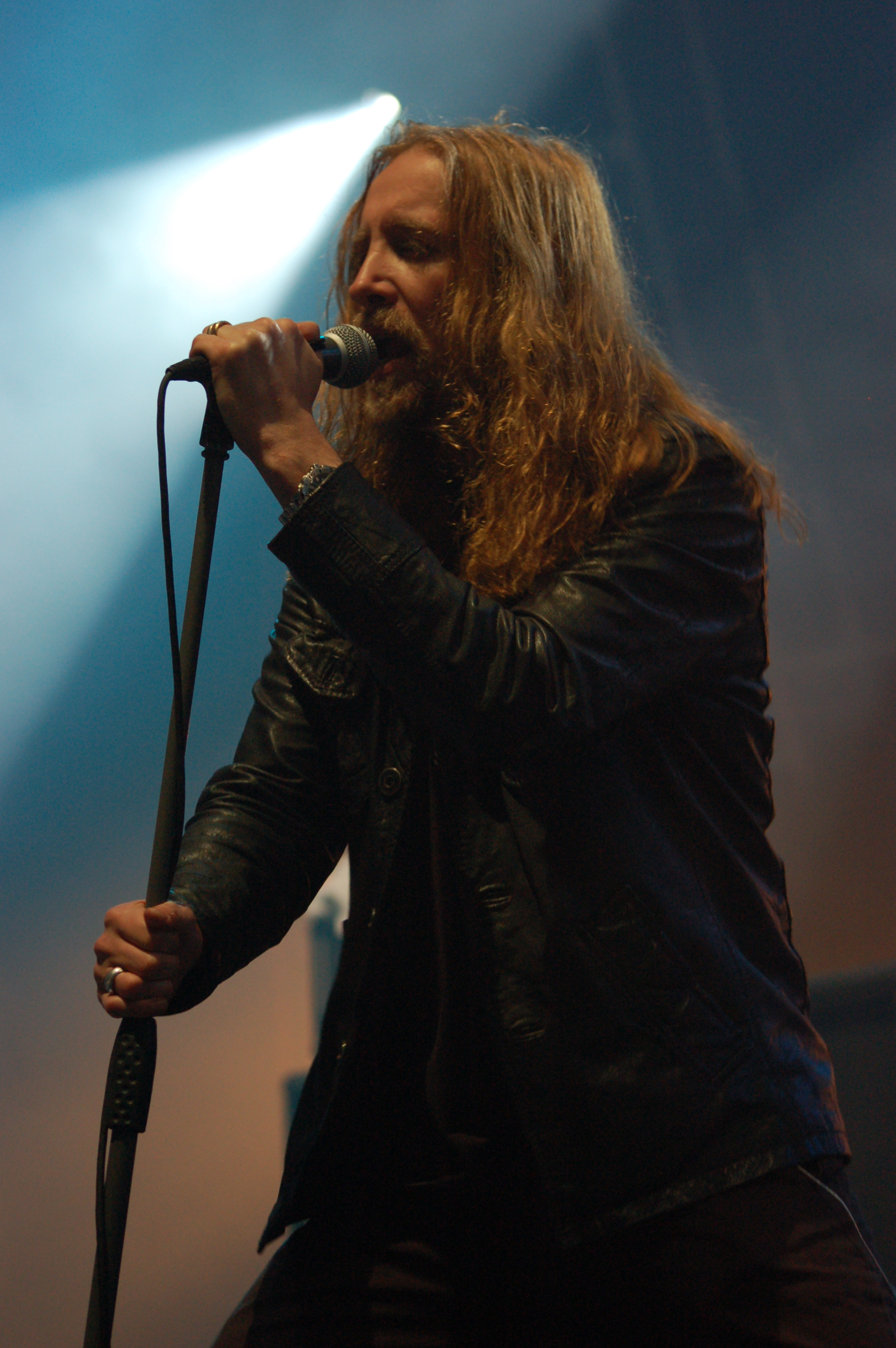
Nick Holmes at Metalmania 2007 festival in Katowice, Poland

At the beginning of 2009, Paradise Lost recorded an album with producer Jens Bogren at Fascination Street Studios in Örebro, Sweden. At the time, there was no full-time replacement for Singer and drums were played by Swedish drummer Peter Damin. On 16 March 2009, when recording for the album was finished, the band recruited Adrian Erlandsson (At the Gates, ex-Cradle of Filth) as a full-time drummer.

On 18 June 2009, Paradise Lost officially announced Faith Divides Us – Death Unites Us as the title of their album, to be released on Century Media Records on 25 September 2009 in Germany, on 28 September 2009 in the rest of Europe and on 6 October 2009 in the US.

Paradise Lost headlined the Jägermeister Stage at Ozzfest 2010 on 18 September 2010.

In late 2011, Paradise Lost began recording its 13th studio album, Tragic Idol, in The Chapel Studios in Lincolnshire. The album was released on 23 April 2012. Adrian Erlandsson was unable to play a few live shows for this album so the band got Jeff Singer again to fill in. They played at Wacken Open Air in August 2012.

Paradise Lost performed some songs at the Metal Hammer Golden Gods awards with Cristina Scabbia on "Say Just Words" and Gus G. on a Black Sabbath cover, "Into the Void".

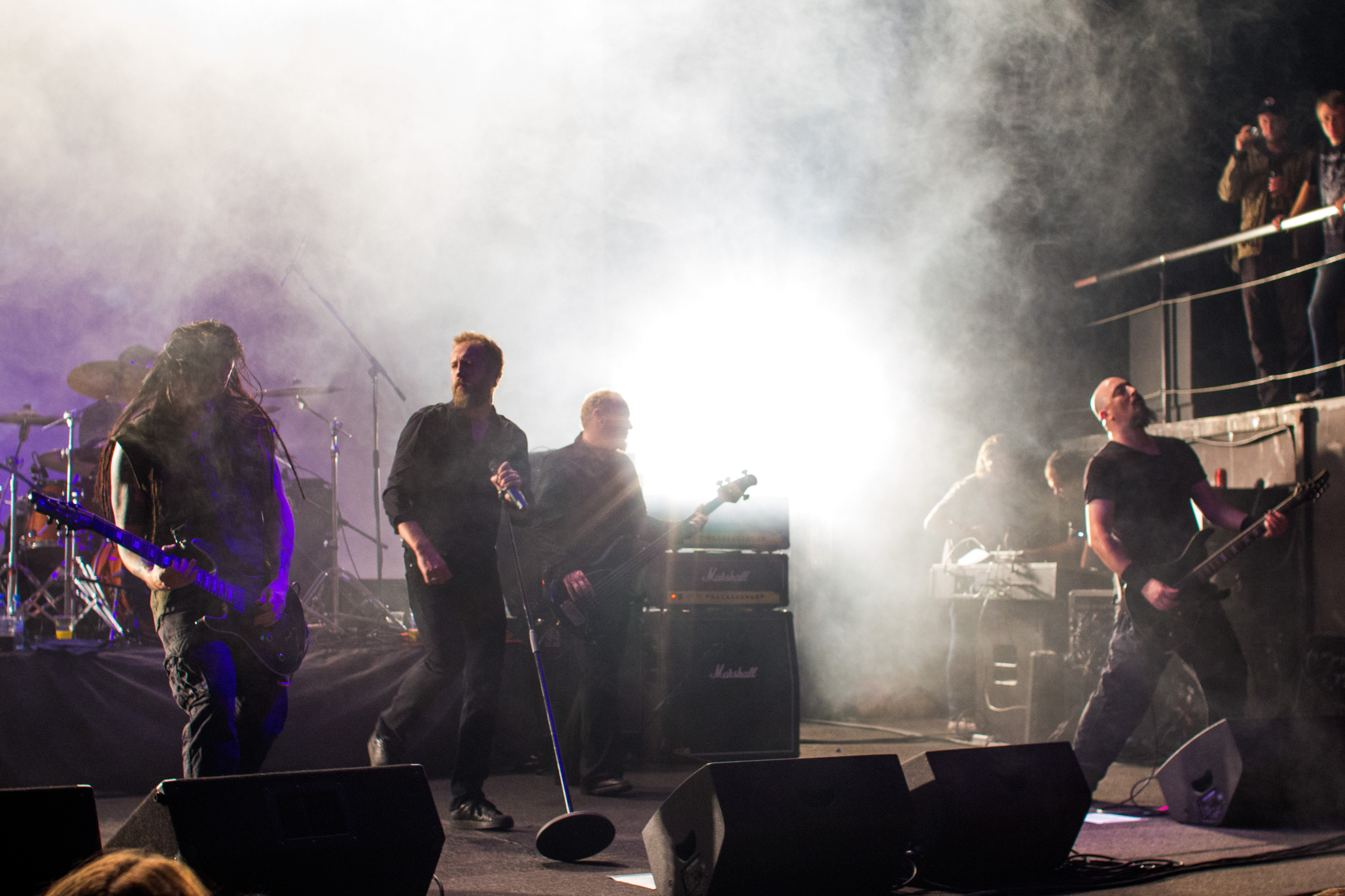
Paradise Lost performing in Saint Petersburg in 2013

On 15 August 2013, the cover and artwork for their compilation album of B-sides, Tragic Illusion 25, were released. From September to October 2014, some songs from the album were released, such as "Loneliness Remains", and older songs that were remade, such as "Our Savior 2013" from Lost Paradise and the title track "Gothic 2013" from Gothic. The album was released on 5 November 2013.

On 27 October 2013, it was announced that writing for the 14th studio album would begin after their 25th-anniversary tour and the recording to the album would start in June 2014. On 29 December 2014, it was revealed that The Plague Within would be the title for the upcoming album. On 26 January 2015, the release date 2 June 2015 was announced, along with producer Jaime Gomez Arellano and the recording location of Orgone Studios, London. Speaking to Rock Sins, Nick Holmes stated that the new album would have elements of all previous Paradise Lost material, including a return to death/doom, stating that "there's some songs that could've been written in 1989, a couple of really old school doom/death songs which are gonna surprise a couple of people when they hear it". The Plague Within is considered by many traditional fans their best and most complete album in many years, as well as a true return to their signature sound.

The band participated in Maryland Deathfest in May 2015.

=== Nuclear Blast (2016–present) ===
On 1 September 2017, Paradise Lost released their 15th studio album, Medusa. The band continued their return to a heavier, doomier sound. Holmes said "...definitely our heaviest album; the heaviest we've done". Medusa was well received by fans and critics.

2018 marked the band's 30th anniversary and was celebrated through select dates around UK and mainland Europe, including their first show in their Halifax hometown, as well as a South and North American tour with Solstafir and The Atlas Moth. In November 2019, Decibel Books issued the band's authorised biography, No Celebration: The Official Story of Paradise Lost. American journalist David E. Gehlke authored the book.

In March 2020, Nuclear Blast announced the release of the group's 16th studio album, Obsidian, for 15 May. Holmes described it as "one of the most eclectic albums we have done in some time, we have miserable songs, sad songs, slow songs and faster songs. Did I mention miserable?". First single "Fall from Grace" premiered on 20 March, with a music video. The next year, the band released the live album At the Mill. While the album was recorded live, the band played with no audience due to the COVID-19 pandemic. On 7 September 2022, drummer Waltteri Väyrynen was announced to have departed the band, who found temporary replacement Guido Montanarini. Montanarini performs with Paradise Lost guitarist/keyboardist Gregor Mackintosh in the band Strigoi. Väyrynen since joined Opeth as their permanent drummer.

In October 2022, Mackintosh and Holmes announced the formation of Host, a synth-pop side-project that is "taking the concept of what we attempted to do on the Paradise Lost album Host but approaching it in a modern context". A music video for the single "Tomorrow's Sky" was uploaded to the label's YouTube page on 21 October 2022. Their debut album, IX, was released on 24 February 2023 via Nuclear Blast.

On 24 March 2023, Paradise Lost announced on their Facebook page that touring drummer Guido Montanarini had become an official member.

In a November 2023 interview with Portugal's Metal Global, Holmes said that Paradise Lost had been working on new material for the follow-up to Obsidian: "Hopefully at the beginning of next year, we can have a few months downtime so we can actually get working more on the album. But we've got a few songs done. I think we've got a few songs done; we need to review them. So, yeah, we'll hopefully write an album next year, anyway. Whether it's gonna be recorded [next year], I don't know, but hopefully at least written".

The band played Maryland Deathfest in 2025.

In May 2025, prior to the release of Ascension, Montanarini became the sixth drummer to leave Paradise Lost. According to Mackintosh, he was dismissed because of "a lot of butting heads". He was replaced with Jeff Singer, who had drummed for Paradise Lost during the 2000s. The band supported King Diamond on tour in Europe during the spring and summer of 2025, along with Angel Witch and Unto Others. Ascension was released on 19 September 2025. They toured Europe the following month alongside Messa, Lacrimas Profundere and High Parasite to promote the album.

== Style and influences ==
Originally coming from death metal, Paradise Lost exerted a decisive influence on the development of death doom and gothic metal in the early 1990s, with their 1991 album Gothic being considered style-defining and name-giving for the latter genre. The apparent influence of the band's early releases has been observed in the work of Anathema, Cathedral and Winter. Other bands that have cited Paradise Lost as an influence (or have covered them) include My Dying Bride, Anathema, The Gathering, Amorphis, Cradle of Filth, Katatonia, Moonspell, Lacuna Coil, HIM, Nightwish and many others.

Guitarist Aaron Aedy said, "In Bradford we used to go to a number of clubs where one minute they'd be playing serious gothic music, and the next minute they'd have on Kreator or something". Nick Holmes cited Iron Maiden's singer Bruce Dickinson in his main influences along with Metallica for their Master of Puppets album. Holmes said that the band's early influences were Black Sabbath and Dead Can Dance: "the old Black Sabbath, that's, to me, the inspiration for when we started the band". Guitarist Mackintosh said that he took inspiration from "Tony Iommi a lot" and also "Johnny Marr [...] Jimi Hendrix and classic music", mixing all these styles with metal music and rock music. Mackintosh also stated that gothic rock was an influence, citing bands like "Southern Death Cult and early Sisters of Mercy, Siouxsie and the Banshees, early Cure". The band was also influenced by sludge metal band the Melvins, which influenced the band's extremely slow tempos. Vocalist Nick Holmes said, "we liked the idea of combining the sort of slower Sabbath riffage, but making it even slower to get the whole doom metal thing going. But honestly, we were so obsessed with the death metal stuff in those days that we didn't really venture that far outside our own musical field".

The band experienced a considerable shift in style between 1997 and 2002, on their albums One Second through Symbol of Life; One Second saw the heavy use of electronics and keyboards and Holmes using clean vocals, with Host moving even more towards synthpop / dark wave. Believe in Nothing moved the band to a more alternative rock direction, with Symbol of Life re-establishing a heavier gothic metal tone. Both Mackintosh and Holmes expressed ambivalence about this period of the band, citing personal problems within the band at the time.

== Band members ==
Paradise Lost, band members at Rockharz 2026

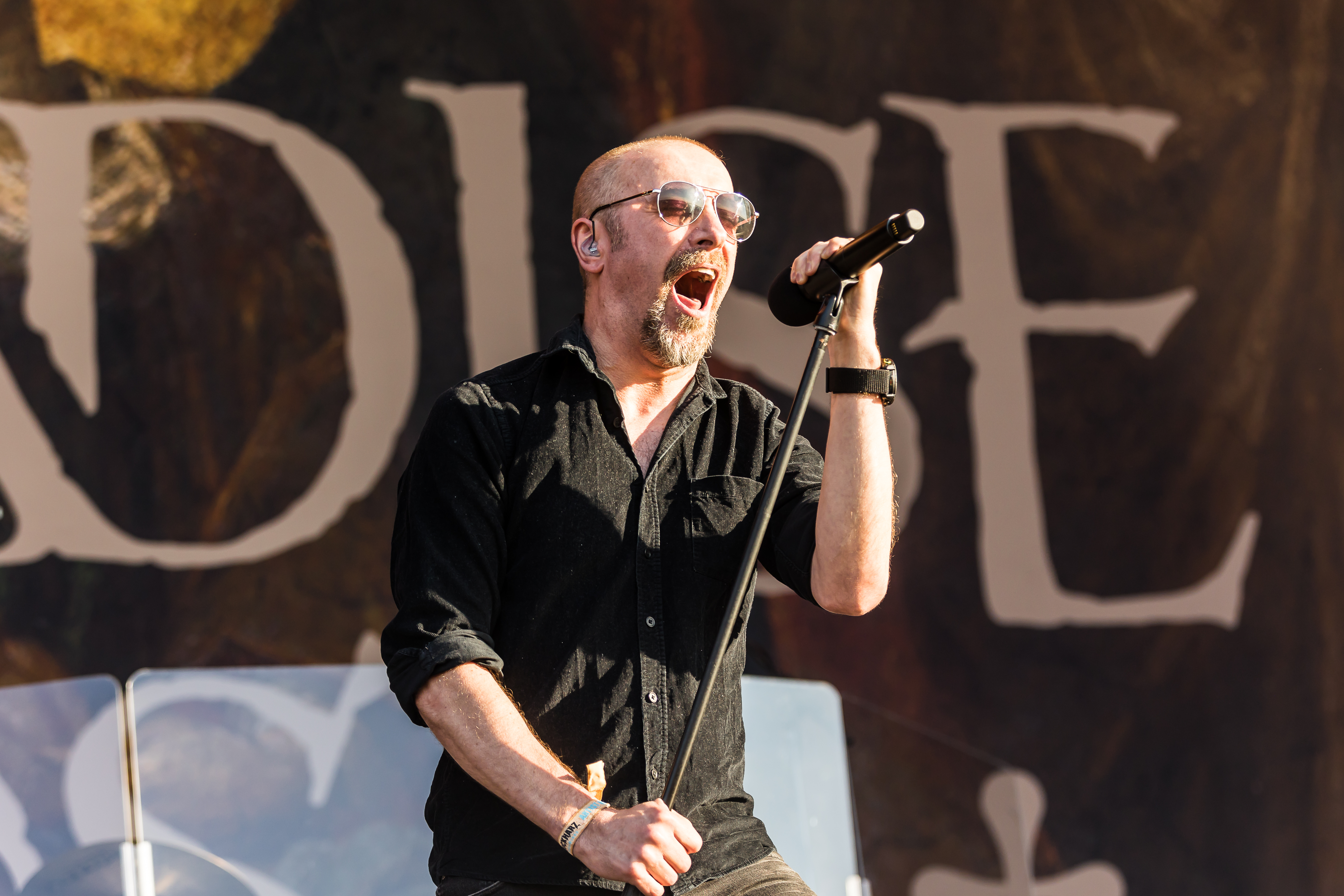
Nick Holmes, vocals

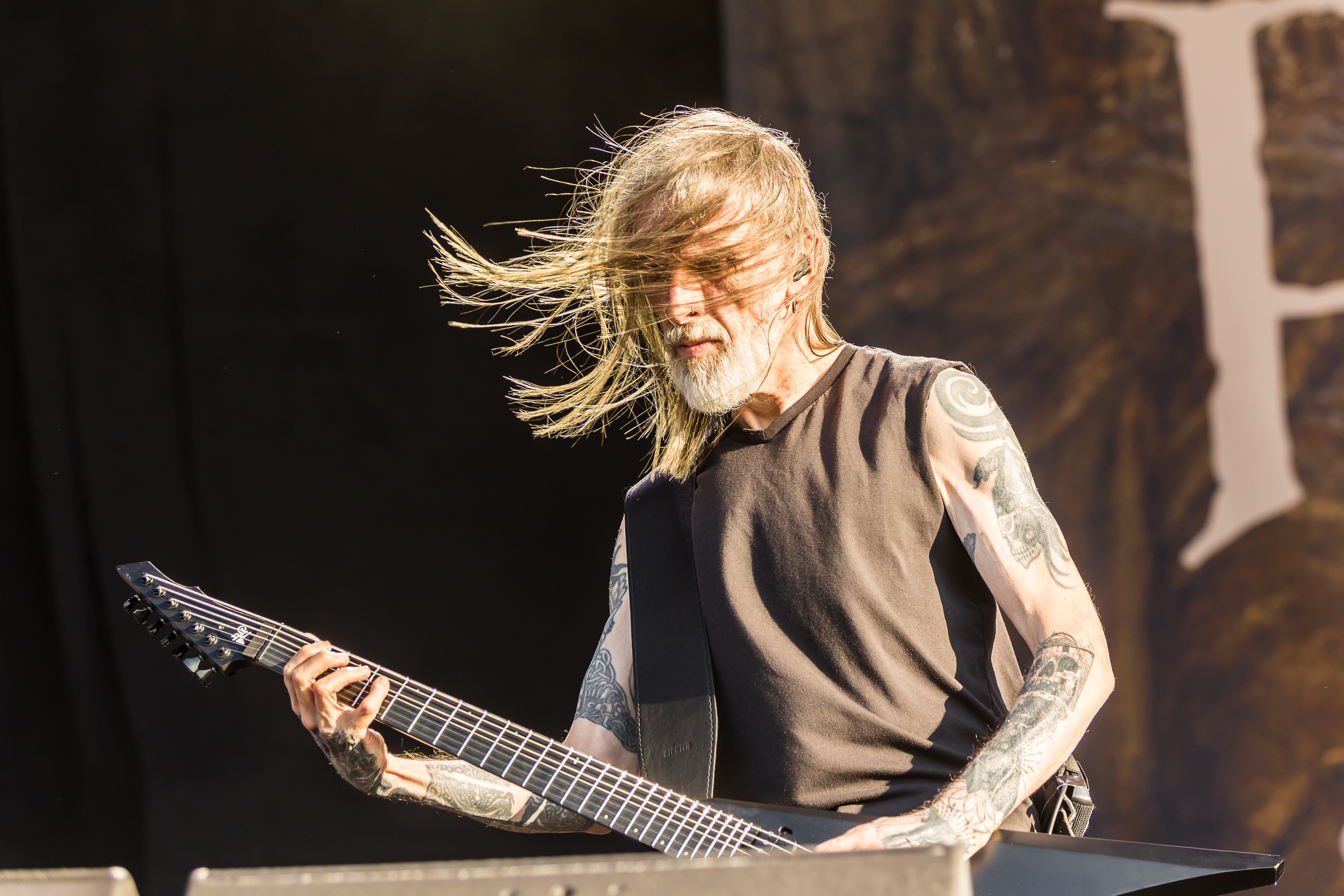
Gregor Mackintosh, guitar

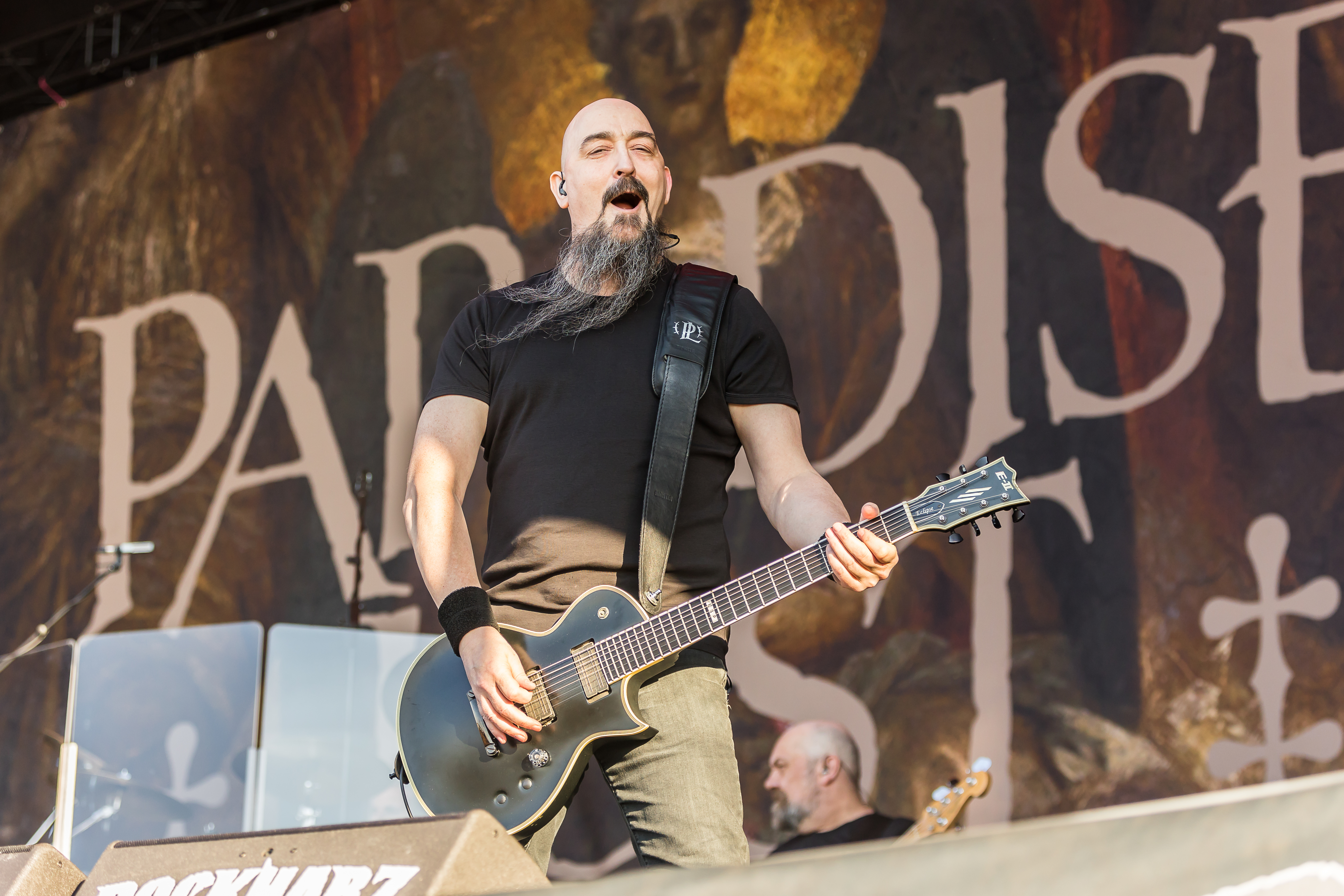
Aaron Aedy, rhythm-guitar

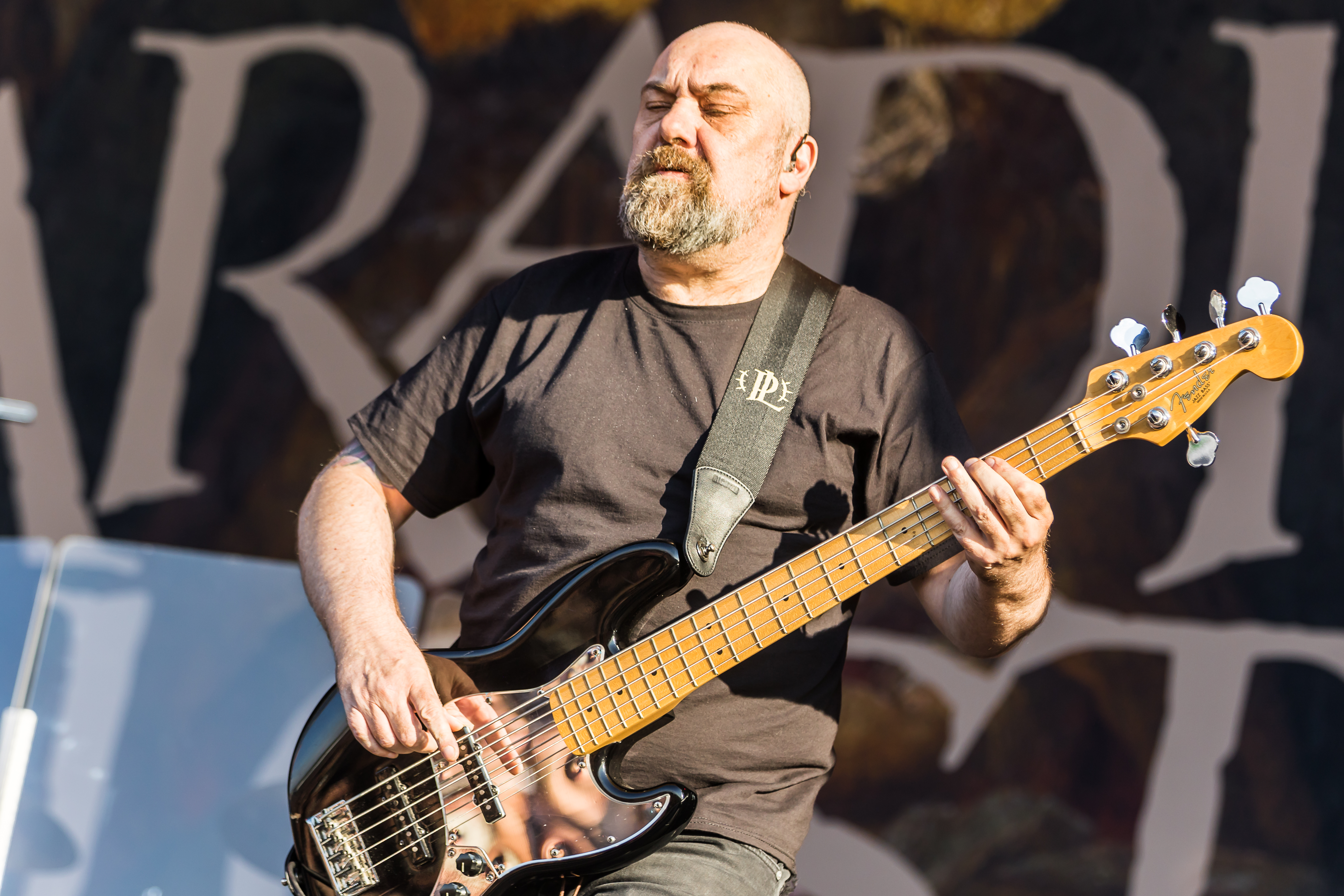
Steve Edmondson, bass

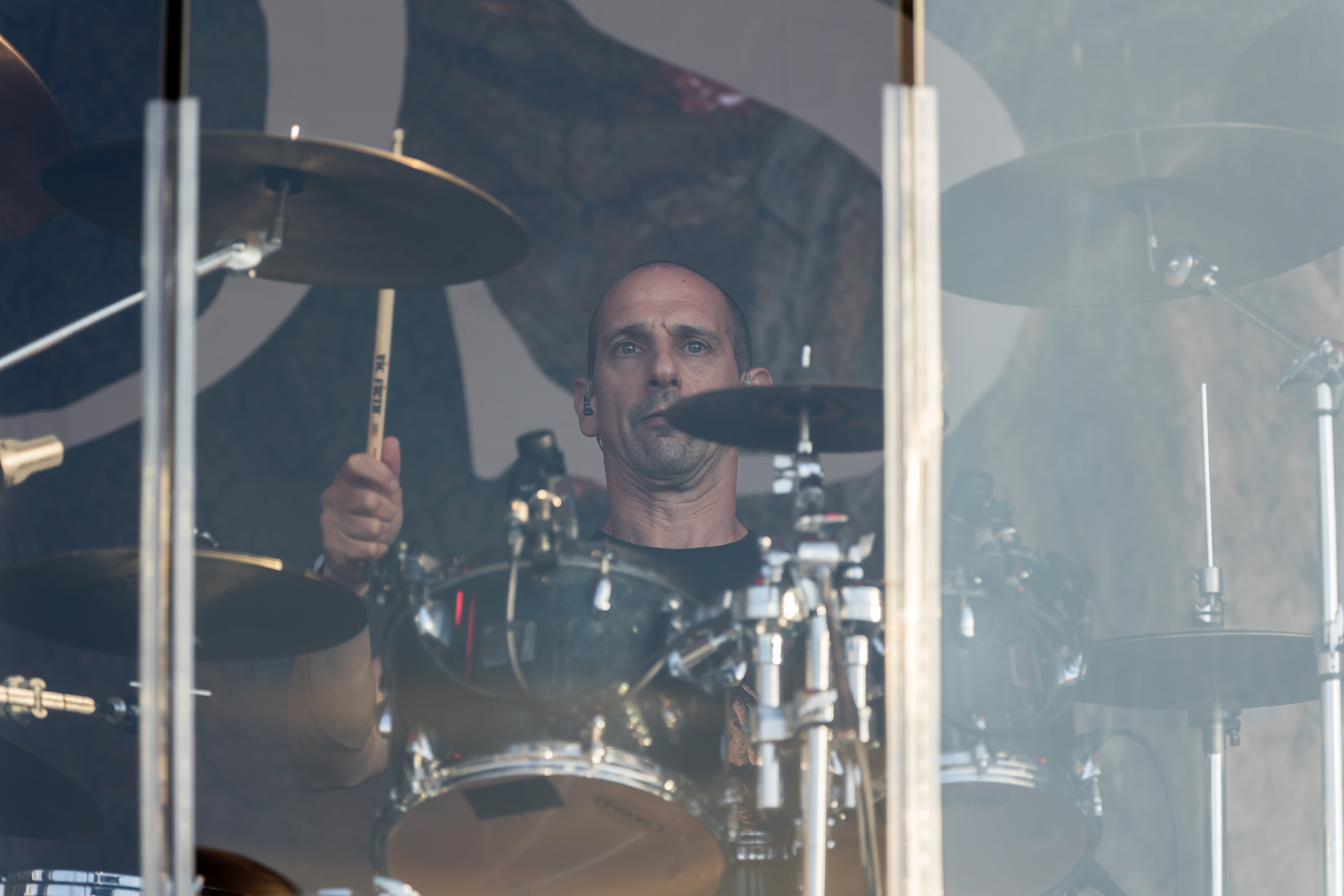
Jeff Singer, drums

=== Current ===
- Nick Holmes – vocals (1988–present)
- Gregor Mackintosh – lead guitar, keyboards (1988–present)
- Aaron Aedy – rhythm guitar (1988–present)
- Stephen Edmondson – bass (1988–present)
- Jeff Singer – drums (2004–2008, 2025–present)

=== Former ===
==== Drummers ====
- Matthew "Tuds" Archer (1988–1993)
- Lee Morris – also backing vocals (1994–2004)
- Adrian Erlandsson (2009–2015)
- Waltteri Väyrynen (2015–2022)
- Guido Montanarini (2022–2025)

==== Session/touring members ====
- Mark Heron – drums (2008–2009)
- Peter Damin – drums (2009)
- Milton "Milly" Evans – lead guitar (1999, 2009–2010), keyboards, backing vocals (2011)

== Discography ==
Studio albums

- Lost Paradise (1990)
- Gothic (1991)
- Shades of God (1992)
- Icon (1993)
- Draconian Times (1995)
- One Second (1997)
- Host (1999)
- Believe in Nothing (2001)
- Symbol of Life (2002)
- Paradise Lost (2005)
- In Requiem (2007)
- Faith Divides Us – Death Unites Us (2009)
- Tragic Idol (2012)
- The Plague Within (2015)
- Medusa (2017)
- Obsidian (2020)
- Ascension (2025)
