= Icon (Paradise Lost album) =

1993 studio album by Paradise Lost

Studio album by Paradise Lost
- Released: 23 September 1993
- Recorded: June–July 1993
- Studios: Jacobs Studios (Surrey, England) and Townhouse Studios (London)
- Genres: Gothic metal; doom metal
- Length: 50:32
- Label: Music for Nations
- Producer: Simon Efemey

Paradise Lost chronology
Shades of God (1992)	Icon (1993)	Draconian Times (1995)

Professional ratings
Review scores
Source	Rating
Allmusic	4.5/5 stars
Metal Storm	(9.8/10)
Rock Hard	(10/10)

Icon is the fourth studio album by British gothic metal band Paradise Lost, released on 28 September 1993 through Music for Nations. It is the band's final album to feature Matthew Archer on drums.

In February 2018, Icon was inducted into the Decibel Magazine Hall of Fame, becoming the second Paradise Lost album to be featured in the Decibel Hall of Fame (alongside Gothic), with the magazine naming it influential to the development of the gothic metal subgenre.

== Style ==
Icon marked a departure from the death-doom sound of their early work. In 2008, speaking to Kerrang! about the album's music, Nick Holmes recalled:

"We were pretty much the first band to coin the phrase 'gothic metal' so I don't have a problem with that label. We've actually done gothier albums than Icon, but if people want to say that it sums up something that's fine with me. At the time there was also black metal, thrash metal and everyone wanted to describe what type of something was so we went 'Okay, we've got The Sisters of Mercy elements in our music, let's call it goth metal'. We were getting better as musicians as well and I was hopefully getting better as a vocalist. When that happens you want to fine-tune what you're doing. It's also about not wanting to get stuck or pigeonholed into one particular musical place. We've kept the whole gothic thing going right throughout our career, but we did want to do something a little different. With the vocals, a lot of it was kind of shouting in key as opposed to just shouting, it's okay singing like Beelzebub, but your voice can get into trouble if you have a big tour."

== Track listing ==
All songs written by Nick Holmes and Gregor Mackintosh.

No.	Title	Length
1.	"Embers Fire"	4:44
2.	"Remembrance"	3:26
3.	"Forging Sympathy"	4:44
4.	"Joys of the Emptiness"	3:29
5.	"Dying Freedom"	3:44
6.	"Widow"	3:04
7.	"Colossal Rains"	4:36
8.	"Weeping Words"	3:51
9.	"Poison"	3:00
10.	"True Belief"	4:30
11.	"Shallow Seasons"	4:55
12.	"Christendom"	4:31
13.	"Deus Misereatur" (instrumental)	1:58
Total length:		50:32

2007 re-release bonus tracks
No.	Title	Length
14.	"Sweetness"	5:34
15.	"Your Hand in Mine"	6:40
Total length:		62:46

== Personnel ==
- Nick Holmes – vocals
- Gregor Mackintosh – guitars
- Aaron Aedy – guitars
- Stephen Edmondson – bass
- Matthew Archer – drums
- Guido Zima Montanarini – drums (Icon 30)

=== Guest musicians ===
- Denise Bernard – female vocals
- Andrew Holdsworth – keyboards

=== Production ===
- Matt Anker – photography
- Geoff Pesche – mastering
- Pete Coleman – mixing
- Simon Efemey – producer, mixing
- Jaime Gomez Arellano – producer (Icon 30)

== Charts ==
Chart (1993)	Peak position
Dutch Albums (Album Top 100)	80
German Albums (Offizielle Top 100)	31

== Icon 30 ==
Icon 30

Studio album of re-recorded songs by Paradise Lost
- Released: 1 December 2023
- Recorded: 2023
- Studios: Arda Recorders (vocals and drums); Black Planet Studios (guitars and bass)
- Genres: Gothic metal; doom metal
- Length: 50:38
- Label: Nuclear Blast
- Producer: Jaime Gomez Arellano

Paradise Lost chronology
Obsidian (2020)	Icon 30 (2023)	Ascension (2025)

Icon 30, a full re-recording of Icon, was released on 1 December 2023 on double vinyl with brand-new artwork, produced by Jaime Gomez Arellano. Vocals and drums were recorded in Arda Recorders in Porto, Portugal, while guitars and bass were recorded in Black Planet Studios, owned by guitarist Gregor Mackintosh. Vocalist Nick Holmes explained, "Our specific record deal around the time we signed for the Icon album meant we would never actually own the rights to our music or artwork, so going forward, to reissue the album ourselves for the 30th anniversary, it was necessary to re-record and completely re-do the album cover." The band will tour the UK in support of the album with My Dying Bride as special guests.

All songs written by Nick Holmes and Gregor Mackintosh.

Icon 30 track listing
No.	Title	Length
1.	"Embers Fire"	4:52
2.	"Remembrance"	3:28
3.	"Forging Sympathy"	4:41
4.	"Joys of the Emptiness"	3:29
5.	"Dying Freedom"	3:43
6.	"Widow"	3:07
7.	"Colossal Rains"	4:31
8.	"Weeping Words"	3:51
9.	"Poison"	3:04
10.	"True Belief"	4:32
11.	"Shallow Seasons"	4:54
12.	"Christendom"	4:33
13.	"Deus Misereatur" (instrumental)	1:53
Total length:		50:38

== Charts ==
Chart (2023)	Peak position
UK Rock & Metal Albums (Official Charts)	33
