= Lee Morris (musician) =

English drummer

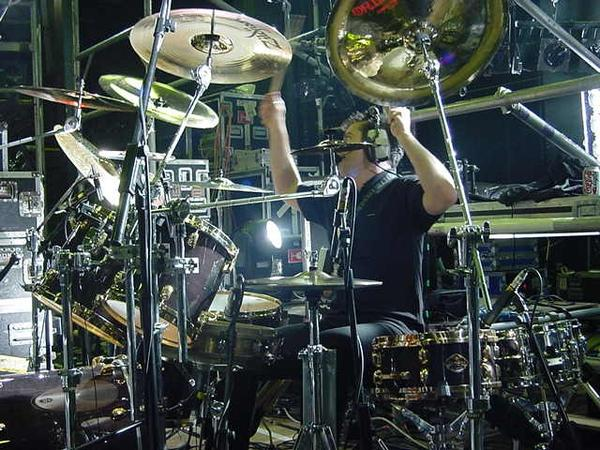

Background information
- Born: 11 January 1970 (age 56); Wolverhampton, England
- Genres: Hard rock, heavy metal, gothic metal
- Member of: Magnum
- Formerly of: Marshall Law, Paradise Lost, Vaughn, Ten

Lee Morris (born 11 January 1970) is an English hard rock and metal drummer, known as current drummer of Magnum and former drummer of Paradise Lost.

== Career ==
Morris came from a musical family and started playing the drums at six years of age. He learnt his instrument from his dad (Ivor Morris) and spent many hours during his early years playing along with various records from the family record collection. At age 12, he joined his first high school cover band, playing the top 40 songs at the time, but the band never played outside the school walls. At the age of 14, Morris discovered a love of rock music after hearing the Iron Maiden Killers and Kiss Alive! albums.

Morris joined his first rock covers band called Wyzed in the early 1980s, and got to enjoy playing rock regularly at various halls, pubs and clubs throughout the English Midlands. He got frustrated with playing covers at that time, and joined Royale, that included Vince O'Regan (Bob Catley / Pulse) in the line-up. During the late 1980s and early 1990s Morris played in his first signed band which was the Birmingham based Marshall Law. He recorded an EP (Power Crazy EP), one studio album (Power Game) and one live album with the outfit before they disbanded. At the start of 1991, Morris auditioned for Little Angels, after a recommendation from departing drummer Michael Lee. He got down to the last two but eventually lost out to Mark Richardson.

After the demise of Marshall Law, Morris was invited to team up with guitarist Robin George in a band called The Promise. He recorded a demo for their album, and appeared on the James Whale TV show, before joining Paradise Lost in December 1994. He recorded five albums with the band between 1994 and 2003 and got to tour the globe several times and played on Top of the Pops in Germany. Blabbermouth reported that Morris "parted ways" with Paradise Lost in 2004 due to "personal and musical differences".

After leaving Paradise Lost, Morris began teaching drums to aspiring drummers, while also getting involved in session work. His first session was some live dates with Ten. He also worked with Danny Vaughn, recording two albums with Vaughn; Traveller and The Road Less Travelled. In 2010, he recorded the Methods to End It All album with Creation's Tears.

In 2011, Morris played drums for the Arabia album, Welcome to the Freakshow, and also performed at the Z Rock Festival with the band. In 2012, he again played the Z Rock Festival with Paul Sabu after having played drums on Sabu's Bangkok Rules album. In September 2013, Thin Lizzy tribute band Limehouse Lizzy announced Lee Morris as their new drummer.

In 2017, he joined the British band Magnum and played on their albums Lost on the Road to Eternity, The Serpent Rings, The Monster Roars, and Here Comes the Rain.
