= Gregor Mackintosh =

British musician

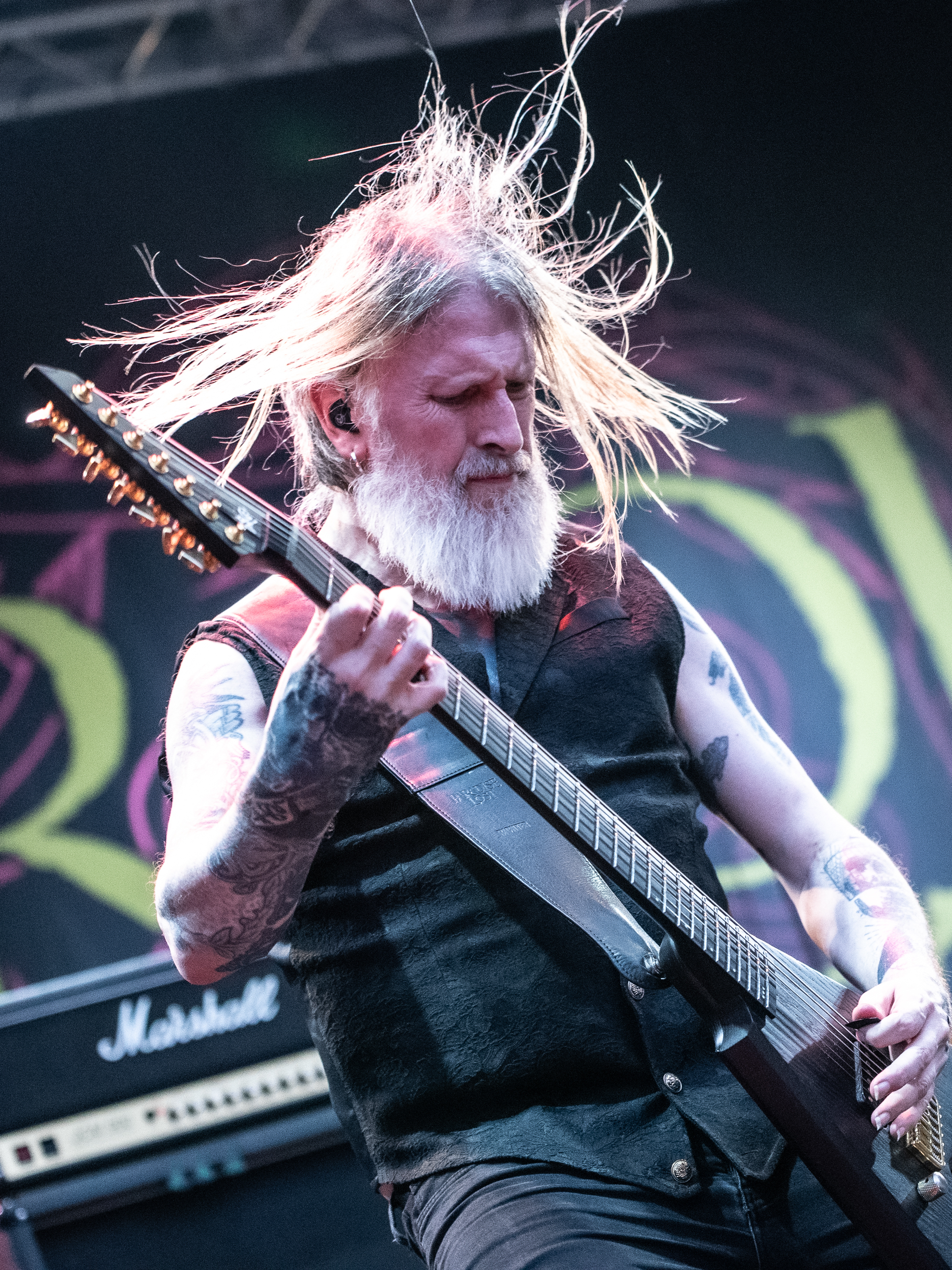
- Mackintosh in 2024

Background information
- Birth name: Gregory John Mackintosh
- Also known as: Greg Mackintosh
- Born: 20 June 1970 (age 55)
- Origin: Halifax, West Yorkshire, England
- Genres: Gothic metal, doom metal, death metal, death-doom, blackened death-doom, gothic rock, dark wave, synth-pop, electronic rock
- Occupation(s): Musician, songwriter
- Instrument(s): Guitar, vocals
- Years active: 1988–present
- Member of: Paradise Lost, Vallenfyre Strigoi, Host

Gregory John Mackintosh (born 20 June 1970), nicknamed Gregor or Greg, is a British guitarist and singer. He is the lead guitarist in the metal band Paradise Lost, which he founded in 1988 together with singer Nick Holmes, rhythm guitarist Aaron Aedy, and bassist Steve Edmondson. He is the main composer of one of the pioneer bands and founding fathers of the gothic metal genre, considered to be influential to many other artists.

Mackintosh also plays keyboards (on several Paradise Lost albums) and uses them to compose music. He founded the bands Vallenfyre, in which he is also the lead vocalist; Strigoi; and Host. Mackintosh has contributed production for the Hull industrial metal act Systemyk.

Regarding his influences, Mackintosh remarked, "I was into punky stuff when I was really young, then I started to delve into the goth stuff – Siouxsie and the Banshees, Bauhaus and especially The Sisters of Mercy."
