= Nick Holmes =

English singer (born 1971)

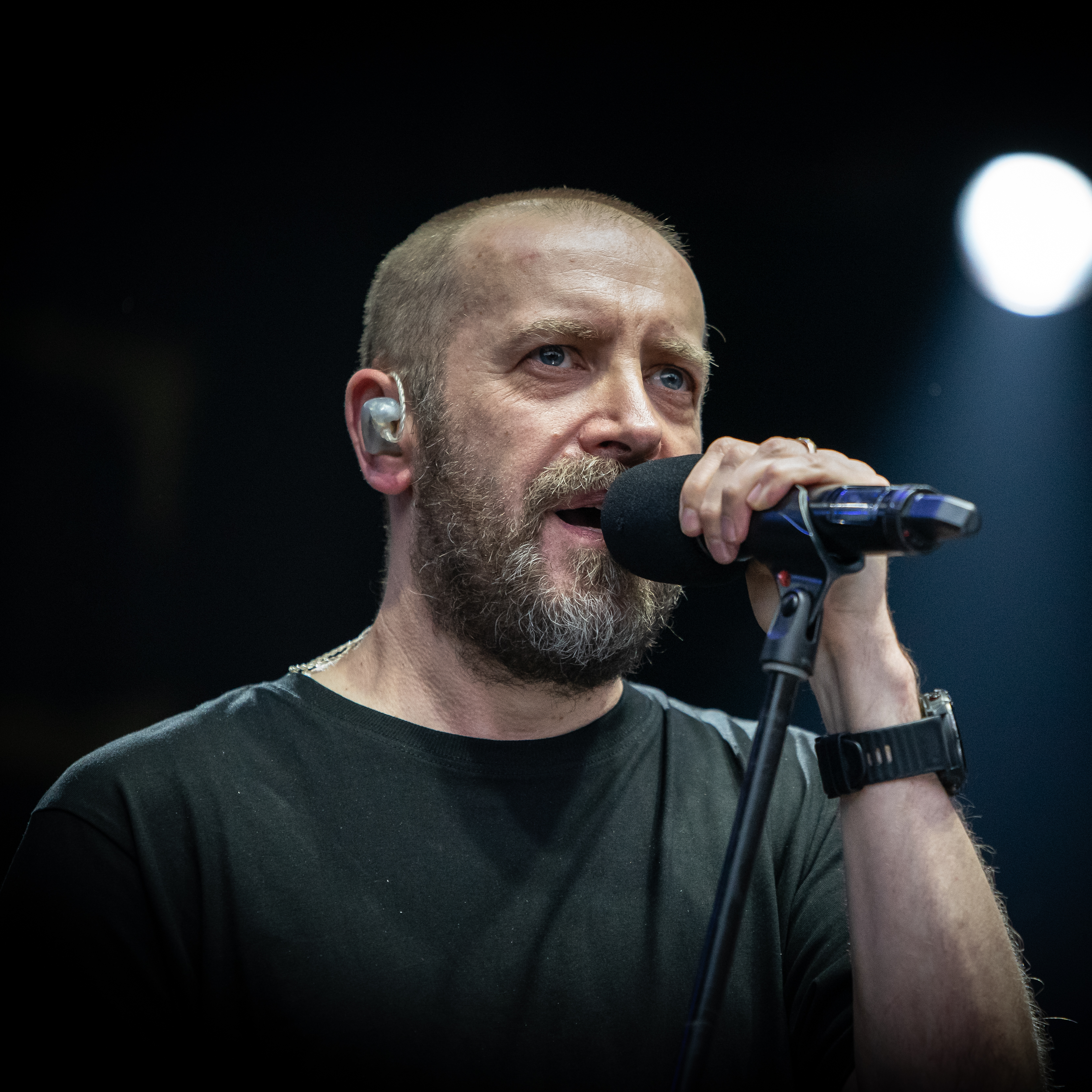
- Holmes performing in 2024

Background information
- Born: Nicholas John Arthur Holmes; 7 January 1971 (age 55)
- Origin: United Kingdom
- Genres: Gothic metal, death metal, death-doom, doom metal, gothic rock, darkwave, electronic rock, synthpop
- Occupations: Singer, songwriter
- Years active: 1988–present
- Member of: Paradise Lost, Bloodbath, Host

Nicholas John Arthur Holmes (born 7 January 1971) is an English singer, best known as the lead vocalist of the gothic metal band Paradise Lost and Swedish death metal supergroup Bloodbath.

== Biography ==
Holmes formed Paradise Lost in late 1988 when he and the other band members were barely out of secondary school.

Like other contemporaries of the British death-doom scene (Anathema and My Dying Bride), the band began purely as death metal, with Holmes using a low, guttural death grunt on their early demos and Lost Paradise (1990), Gothic (1991), and Shades of God (1992) full-lengths (though the latter two albums were not exclusively death metal in execution, and Holmes even utilized some clean vocals as well). Beginning with 1993's Icon, the death grunts were discarded entirely in favour of a raw but decipherable James Hetfield-like bellow. When the band yet again transitioned stylistically with 1997's One Second, Holmes' vocals took on a more gothic rock croon, which remained his prevalent style for the next several albums that followed. However, with 2015's The Plague Within, the band reincorporated low growls in some songs, a style which continued with 2017's Medusa and 2020's Obsidian.

In September 2014, it was officially announced that Holmes had replaced Mikael Åkerfeldt as the vocalist in the Swedish death metal band Bloodbath, taking the moniker Old Nick. He has thus far released three albums with the band, Grand Morbid Funeral (2014), The Arrow of Satan Is Drawn (2018) and Survival of the Sickest (2022).

== Discography ==
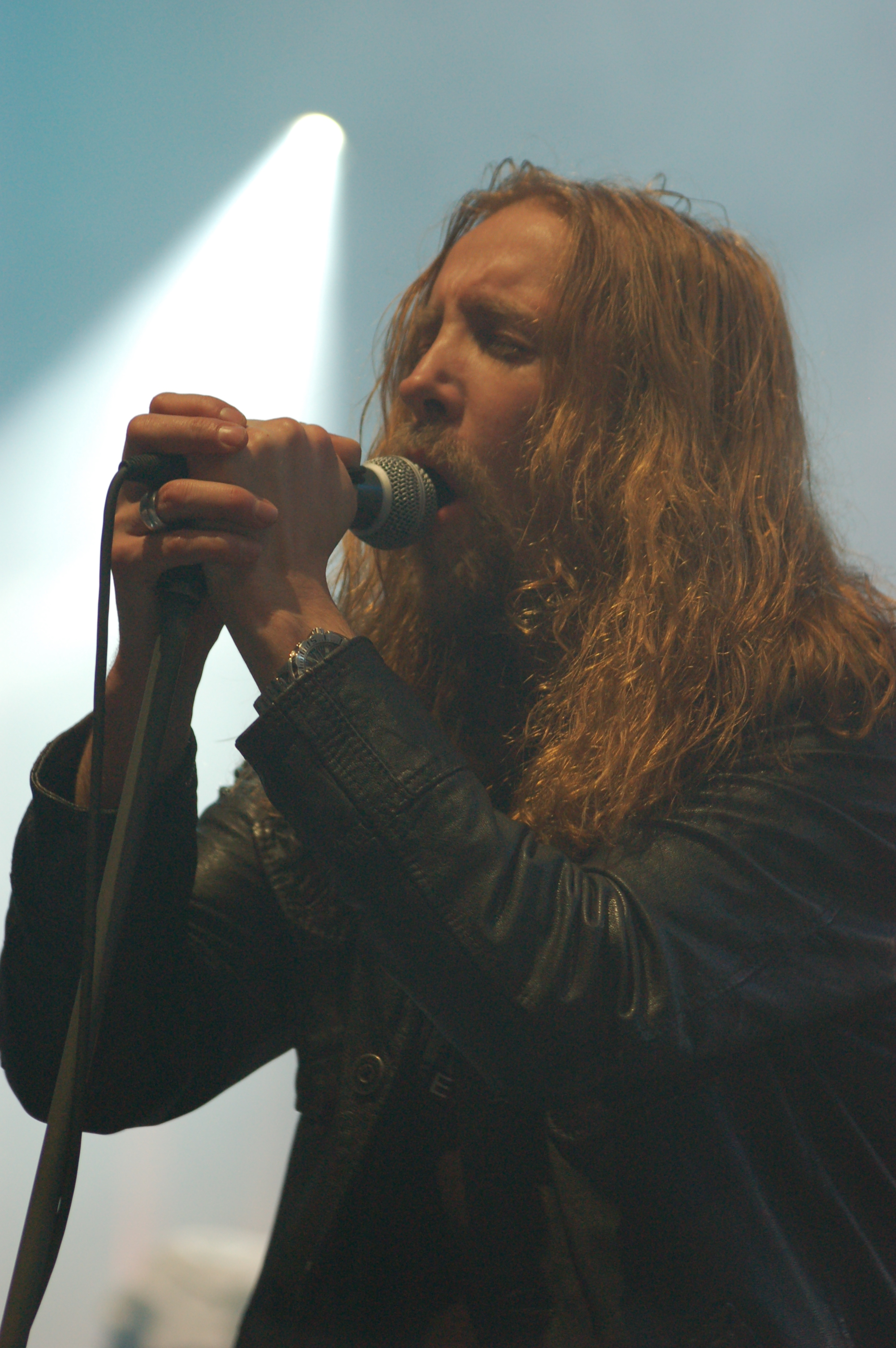
Holmes in 2007

=== With Bloodbath ===
- Grand Morbid Funeral (2014, Peaceville Records)
- The Arrow of Satan is Drawn (2018, Peaceville Records)
- Survival of the Sickest (2022, Napalm Records)

=== With Host ===
- IX (2023, Nuclear Blast)

=== Guest appearances ===
- 3 AM – "Deus Ex Machina" – Liv Kristine (1998, Swanlake)
- For a Voice Like Thunder – "Rituals" – Rotting Christ (2016, Season of Mist)
- Gallows Bird – "Hour of the Nightingale" – Trees of Eternity (2016, Svart Records)
- Wake Up the Coma – "Wake Up the Coma" – Front Line Assembly (2019, Metropolis Records)
- Where Fear and Weapons Meet – "…and a Cross Now Marks His Place" – 1914 (2021, Napalm Records)

== Filmography ==
- 666 - At Calling Death (1993, documentary, directed: Matt Vain)
- Over the Madness (2007, documentary, directed: Diran Noubar)
