= The Young Gods discography =

- Studio albums: 13
- Extended plays: 2
- Live albums: 4
- Tribute albums: 1
- Singles: 8
- Video albums: 1
- Music videos: 5

This is a comprehensive discography of The Young Gods, a Swiss industrial/experimental band.

== Studio albums ==
| Name | Notes | Chart positions | | |
| Name | Notes | SWI | NLD | UK |
|---|---|---|---|---|
| The Young Gods | Debut studio album; Released in April 1987; Label: Wax Trax!; Spent 2 weeks on Swiss charts | 22 | - | - |
| L'Eau Rouge | Second studio album; Released in September 1989; Label: PIAS | - | - | - |
| The Young Gods Play Kurt Weill | Contains covers of famous German composer Kurt Weill; Released in April 1991; Label: PIAS | - | - | - |
| T.V. Sky | Third studio album; Released on 7 February 1992; Label: PIAS; Spent 6 weeks on Swiss charts | 26 | - | 54 |
| Only Heaven | Fourth studio album; Released on 27 June 1995; Label: Interscope; Spent 8 weeks on Swiss charts | 11 | 85 | 91 |
| Heaven Deconstruction | First instrumental album; Released in 1996; Label:PIAS | - | - | - |
| Second Nature | Fifth studio album; Released on 30 October 2000; Label: Ipecac; Spent 3 weeks on Swiss charts | 59 | - | - |
| Music for Artificial Clouds | Second instrumental album; Released on 16 March 2004; Label:Intoxygene | - | - | - |
| Super Ready/Fragmenté | Sixth studio album; Released on 16 April 2007; Label: Ipecac; Spent 4 weeks on Swiss charts | 21 | - | - |
| Everybody Knows | Seventh studio album; Released on 5 November 2010; Label: Two Gentlemen; Spent 5 weeks on Swiss charts | 9 | - | - |
| Data Mirage Tangram | Eighth studio album; Released on 22 February 2019; Label: Two Gentlemen; Spent 7 weeks on Swiss charts | 5 | - | - |
| The Young Gods Play Terry Riley In C | Is a rendition of composer Terry Riley's In C; Released on 9 September 2022; Label: Two Gentlemen | 30 | - | - |
| Appear Disappear | Ninth studio album; Released on 13 June 2025; Label: Two Gentlemen | 1 | - | - |

== Live albums and compilations ==
| Name | Notes | Chart positions |
| Name | Notes | SWI |
|---|---|---|
| Live Sky Tour | First official live album; Released on 13 July 1993; Label: PIAS | - |
| Live Noumatrouff, 1997 | Second official live album; Released on 15 May 2001; Label: Intoxygene | - |
| XXY | Greatest hits/rarities compilation; Released on 10 November 2005; Label: PIAS | - |
| Knock on Wood | Live album and DVD; Released on 21 April 2008; Label: PIAS; Spent 5 weeks on Swiss charts | 21 |
| Data Mirage Tangram: Live at La Maroquinerie, Paris 2019 | Live album; Released on 17 July 2020; Label: Two Gentlemen | - |
| We Are All Young Gods | Live album; Released on 30 October 2026; Label: Two Gentlemen | 17 |

== Singles ==
| Title | Year | Album |
|---|---|---|
| 1986 | "Envoyé!" | — |
| 1987 | "Did You Miss Me?" | The Young Gods |
| 1988 | "L'Amourir" | L'eau rouge |
| 1990 | "Longue route" | L'eau rouge |
| 1991 | "Skinflowers" | T.V. Sky |
| 1992 | "Gasoline Man" | T.V. Sky |
| 1995 | "Kissing the Sun" | Only Heaven |
| 2000 | "Lucidogen" | Second Nature |
| 2002 | "Denature.1 Astronomic" | Second Nature |
| 2005 | "Secret" | XXY |
| 2007 | "C'est quoi c'est ça" | Super Ready/Fragmenté |
| 2007 | "I'm the Drug" | Super Ready/Fragmenté |
| 2010 | "No Land's Man" | Everybody Knows |
| 2018 | "Figure sans nom" | Data Mirage Tangram |
| 2019 | "Tear Up the Red Sky" | Data Mirage Tangram |
| 2019 | "You Gave Me a Name" | Data Mirage Tangram |

== Music videos ==
| Year | Title | Director |
|---|---|---|
| 1986 | "Envoyé!" | |
| 1988 | "L'Amourir" | |
| 1989 | "Rue des Tempêtes" | |
| 1991 | "September Song" | |
| 1991 | "Skinflowers" | |
| 1992 | "Gasoline Man" | |
| 1995 | "Kissing the Sun" | |
| 2000 | "Lucidogen" | Rinaldo Marasco |
