= Franz Treichler =

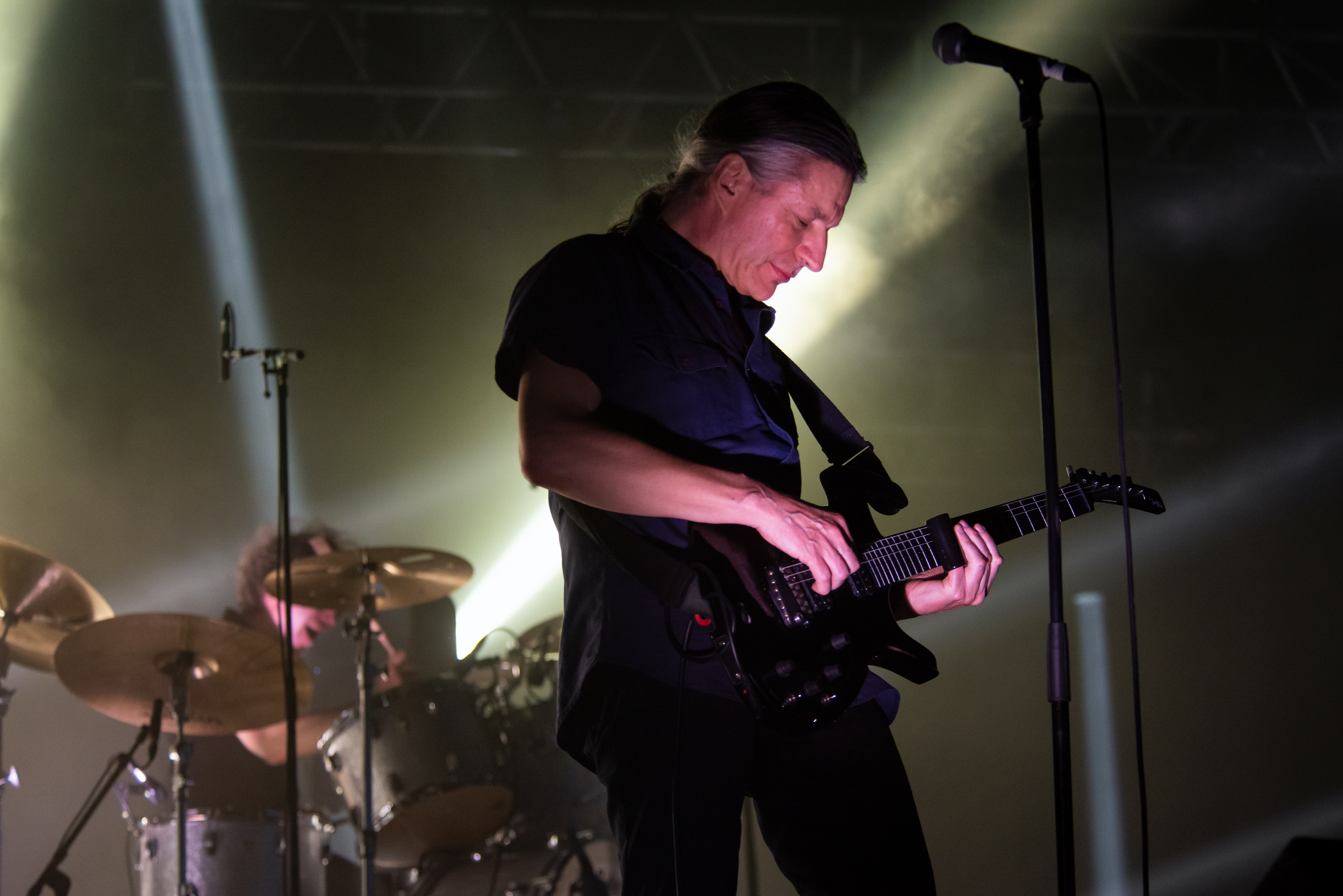
- Treichler in 2019

Background information
- Birth name: Francisco José Conceição Leitão Treichler
- Also known as: Franz Muse
- Born: 14 November 1961 (age 63); Fribourg, Switzerland
- Genres: Industrial rock; electronic; industrial; punk rock (early)
- Occupations: Singer; songwriter; musician; composer; record producer
- Instruments: Vocals; guitar; sampler
- Years active: 1979–present
- Labels: Intoxygene
- Member of: The Young Gods; /A\
- Formerly of: Jof & the Ram; Schizoids
- Website: younggods.com

Francisco José Conceição Leitão Treichler (born 14 November 1961), better known as Franz Treichler, is a Swiss singer, songwriter, musician, composer and record producer. He is best known as the vocalist and sole consistent member of the Swiss industrial rock band The Young Gods, which he founded in 1985 with sampler player Cesare Pizzi and drummer Frank Bagnoud. Treichler was instrumental in the band's adoption of samplers as a main instrument. He released his solo debut album, Braindance in 2001.

== Early and private life ==
Treichler was born on 14 November 1961 in Fribourg. His father is Brazilian and the former editor of the Portuguese language division of Swiss Radio International. His mother is a German-speaking Swiss. Treichler enrolled in Fribourg Conservatory in 1971 and then attended Lausanne Conservatory, where he studied classical guitar. He was introduced to rock music artists such as Pink Floyd and Jimi Hendrix by his older brother. Moving to Geneva in 1977, he was introduced to the burgeoning punk rock movement.

In 1979, Treichler formed the band Johnny Furgler & the Raclette Machine, which became Fribourg's first punk rock band. The band featured Cesare Pizzi on bass and Jacques Schouwey on drums while Treichler sang and played guitar. Pizzi was replaced by Heleen Wubbe at the same year and the band changed their name to Jof & the Ram. The band's self-titled EP was recorded and released in 1979 and 1981, respectively; Jof & the Ram broke up in 1983. During this time, Treichler also played guitar in the punk rock band Schizoids. In 1981, along with Schouwey and Wubbe, he became the co-founder of Fri-Son concert hall in Fribourg.

Treichler was married to his Jof & the Ram bandmate, Heleen Wubbe. They resided in Geneva. Heleen died in February 17, 2023, from cancer.

== Music career ==
=== The Young Gods ===
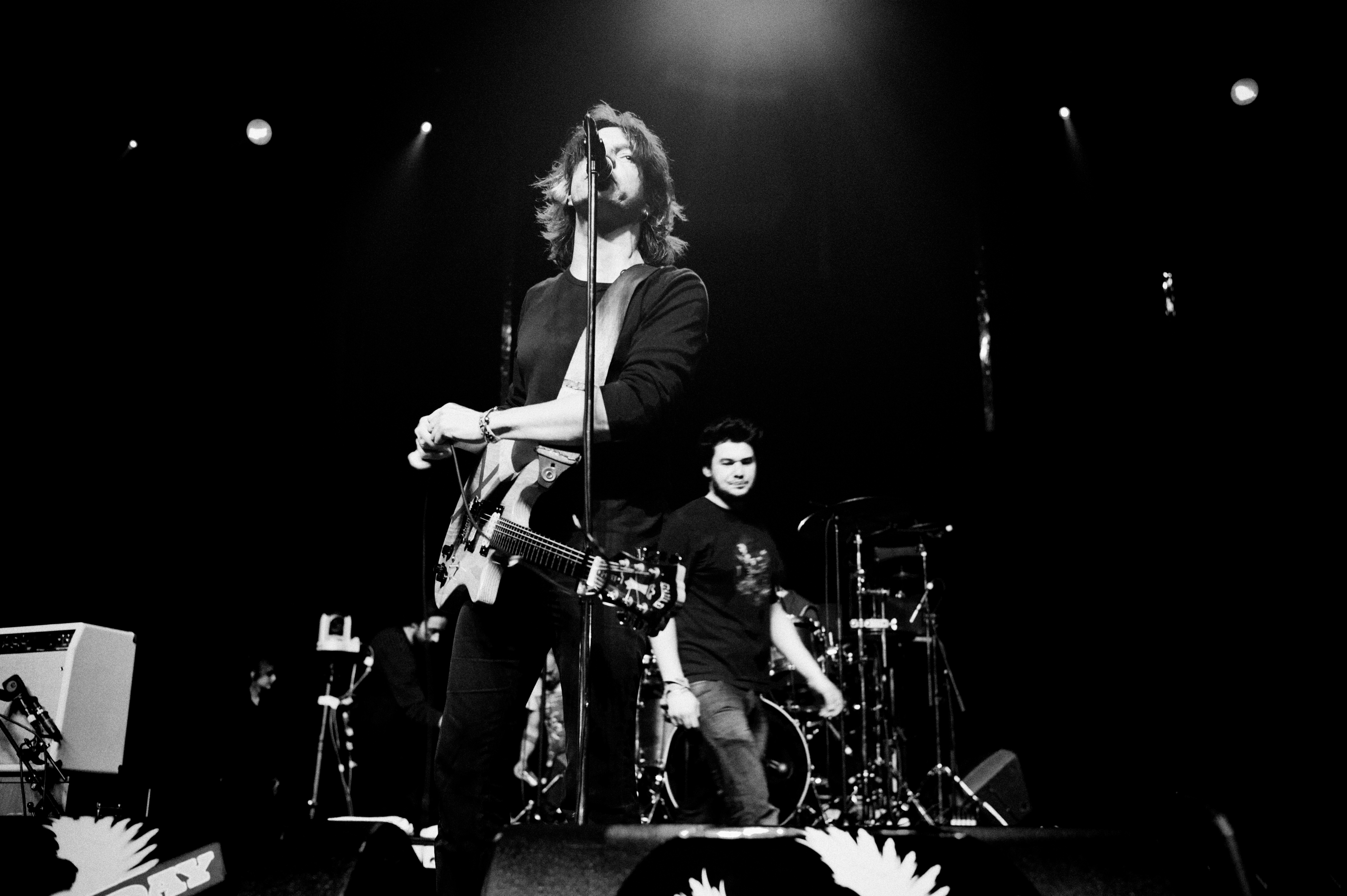
Treichler performing with The Young Gods in 2010

Relocating to Geneva following the demise of Jof & the Ram, Treichler formed The Young Gods with Cesare Pizzi and Frank Bagnoud in 1985. The band originated from Treichler's sound collage experiments with a 4-track recorder and eschewed guitars in favour of a sampler, composing music from distorted guitar and classical music loops. Working with Swans member and producer Roli Mosimann, the band released 1987's The Young Gods and 1989 L'eau rouge to critical acclaim from publications such as Melody Maker. In 1993, the band released The Young Gods Play Kurt Weill, which featured covers of Kurt Weill compositions.

Treichler relocated to the New York for the recording of the band's English-language record T.V. Sky (1992) and Interscope-debut, Only Heaven (1995). He relocated to Switzerland following the departure of the band's second drummer, Urs Hiestand. The band has released electronic-influenced record Second Nature and Super Ready/Fragmenté in 2000 and 2007, respectively. Treichler resumed playing guitar on 2008's Knock on Wood, as well as on the band's 2010 and 2019 studio albums, Everybody Knows and Data Mirage Tangram.

=== Solo work and record production ===
Treichler is also a record producer, having worked with French industrial metal band Treponem Pal on their self-titled 1989 debut and 1993's Excess & Overdrive. He has also produced remixes for artists such as Prong, Foetus and Noir Désir.

In the late 90s, Treichler composed electronic music pieces for dance companies. His compositions for the Swiss choreographer Gilles Jobin from 1997 to 1999 were compiled on his solo studio album, 2001's Braindance. In 2014, Treichler was awarded the Swiss Grand Award for Music. In 2015, he scored an exhibition curated by the Swiss artist Donatella Bernardi.

In 2021, he released a collaborative album with Emily Zoé and Nicolas Pittet under the name /A\.

== Influences ==
Treichler has cited late 60s to early 70s psychedelic music, punk rock, Einstürzende Neubauten and 90s electronic music scene as personal influences. He has also named Kraftwerk and post-punk acts such as Killing Joke, Wire and Gang of Four as additional influences on The Young Gods. His favourite albums include The Doors's L.A. Woman, The Ruts's The Crack and Einstürzende Neubauten's Zeichnungen des Patienten O. T., among others.

== Discography ==
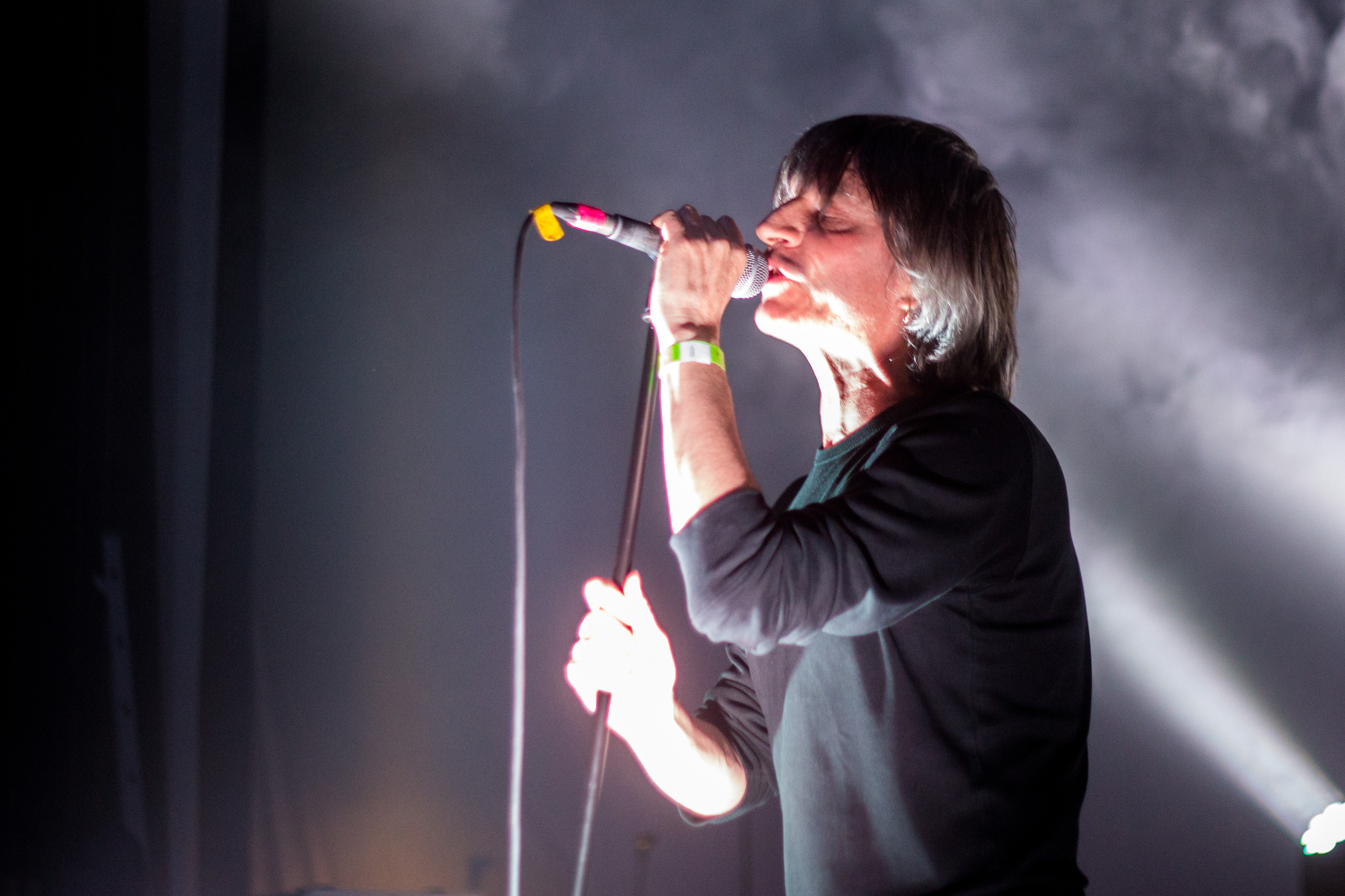
Treichler with The Young Gods in 2014

=== With /A\ ===
- /A\ (2021)

=== Solo discography ===
Studio albums

- Braindance (2001)

Compilation appearances

- "Requiem pour un con" — Great Jewish Music: Serge Gainsbourg (1997)
- "Haïku écrasé" — Haikus urbains (1997)
- "Urban paupière" — Haikus urbains (1997)
- "Illustracion" — Enquête sur le monde invisible (2002)
- "Quintet OP.1" — Intox (2002)
- "Requiem pour un con" — XXY (2005)
- "Ting" — Isn't Nits (2014)

Guest appearances

- Mob Research — "In the Atmosphere" (2012)

=== Technical credits ===
Production work

- Treponem Pal — Treponem Pal (1989)
- Al Comet — L.A.D. (1990)
- Le Faster — Le Faster (1991)
- Al Comet — Europ Pirat Tour (1991)
- Aujourd'hui Madame — Aujourd'hui Madame (1991)
- Shanghai Ladies / Bishop's Daughter — Shanghai Ladies / Bishop's Daughter (1992)
- The Young Gods — Live Sky Tour (1993)
- Treponem Pal — "Pushing You Too Far" (1993)
- Treponem Pal — Excess & Overdrive (1993)
- The Young Gods — Second Nature (2000)
- The Young Gods — "Lucidogen" (2000)
- 7 Tone — La science des fous (2002)
- The Young Gods — XXY (2005)
- The Young Gods — Everybody Knows (2010)
- Sunisit — Sunisit (2013)
- The Young Gods — Data Mirage Tangram (2019)

Remixes

- The Young Gods — "Skinflowers (Brain Forest Remix)" (1991)
- The Young Gods — "Skinflowers (Courtney Speed Love Mix)" (1991)
- The Young Gods — "Gasoline Man (Megadrive Mix)" (1992)
- That Petrol Emotion — "Blue to Black (Remix)" (1993)
- Gary Clail & On-U Sound System — "These Things Are Worth Fighting For (Young Gods Club Mix)" (1993)
- Treponem Pal — "Pushing You Too Far (Tribal Mix)" (1993)
- Prong — "Controller (Club Industrial Mix)" (1996)
- The Young Gods — "Gasoline Man (Megadrive Mix)" (1996)
- Noir Désir — "Le fleuve (A.M.P) (Franz Treichler Mix)" (1998)
- The Mark of Cain — "Interloper (Prelude)" (1998)
- The Mark of Cain — "Interloper (Who Made Who Mix)" (1998)
- Polar — "Bipolar Dream (Echo Version)" (1999)
- Foetus — "The Need Machine (Franz Treichler Mix)" (2001)
