= XXY (album) =

Greatest hits album by The Young Gods
- Released: November 10, 2005
- Recorded: TYG Studio Artamis & Boa Studio
- Genre: Industrial
- Label: PIAS
- Producers: Franz Treichler; Roli Mosimann

The Young Gods chronology
Music for Artificial Clouds (2004)	XXY (2005)	Super Ready/Fragmenté (2007)

Professional ratings
Review scores
Source	Rating
Allmusic	(?)

XXY is a greatest hits/rarities album by The Young Gods. It spans from 1985 to 2005.

== Track listing ==
=== Disc 1 ===
1. "Secret" (Previously Unreleased) - 3:49
2. "Lucidogen" (From Second Nature) - 4:10
3. "Skinflowers (Video Edit) (From T.V. Sky)" - 4:04
4. "Gasoline Man" (From T.V. Sky) - 4:22
5. "Kissing the Sun" (From Only Heaven) - 3:42
6. "Did You Miss Me?" (From The Young Gods) - 3:21
7. "Envoyé!" (From the Envoyé! single) - 2:13
8. "Fais La Mouette" (From The Young Gods) - 4:46
9. "September Song" (From The Young Gods Play Kurt Weill) - 2:44
10. "L’eau Rouge" (From L'Eau Rouge) - 4:22
11. "L'Amourir" (From the L'Amourir single) - 4:17
12. "Pas Mal" (From the L'Amourir single) - 2:46
13. "Charlotte" (From L'Eau Rouge) - 2:04
14. "Our House" (From T.V. Sky) - 2:51
15. "Astronomic" (From Second Nature) - 5:45
16. "Gardez Les Esprits" (From Only Heaven) - 1:07
17. "Toi Du Monde (Edit)" (From Second Nature) - 5:16
18. "Child In The Tree" (From Only Heaven) - 2:18
19. "Donnez Les Esprits" (From Only Heaven) - 6:14
20. "Alabama Song" (From The Young Gods Play Kurt Weill) - 5:50

=== Disc 2 ===
1. "Gasoline Man (Megadrive Mix)" - 6:47
2. "Astronomic (Astronomix Edit)" - 6:07
3. "Skinflowers (Brainforest Mix by F. Treichler)" - 7:27
4. "In The Otherland (Lithos Mix by B. Trontin)" - 3:21
5. "Child In The Tree (String Arrangement Demo by F. Rodi)" - 2:18
6. "Drun (from Heaven Deconstruction by TYG - Album Version)" - 4:36
7. "Supersonic (Dub Mix by F. Treichler)" - 6:00
8. "Requiem Pour Un Con" (Serge Gainsbourg)- 4:58
9. "Astronomic (Version 2 - Edit by V. Hänni)" - 6:33
10. "The End (Live Cover by TYG)" - 3:17
11. "Supersonic (Al Mix by A. Monod)" - 6:00
12. "Kissing The Sun (Dub The Sun Mix by Mad Professor)" - 4:36
13. "The Sound In Your Eyes (Naïve Mix by B. Trontin)" - 3:55
14. "Astronomic (As_Float Mix - Edit by V. Hänni)" - 6:47
15. "Iwasi (from Music For Artificial Clouds by TYG - Album Version)" - 5:25
