= Treponem Pal =

French industrial metal band

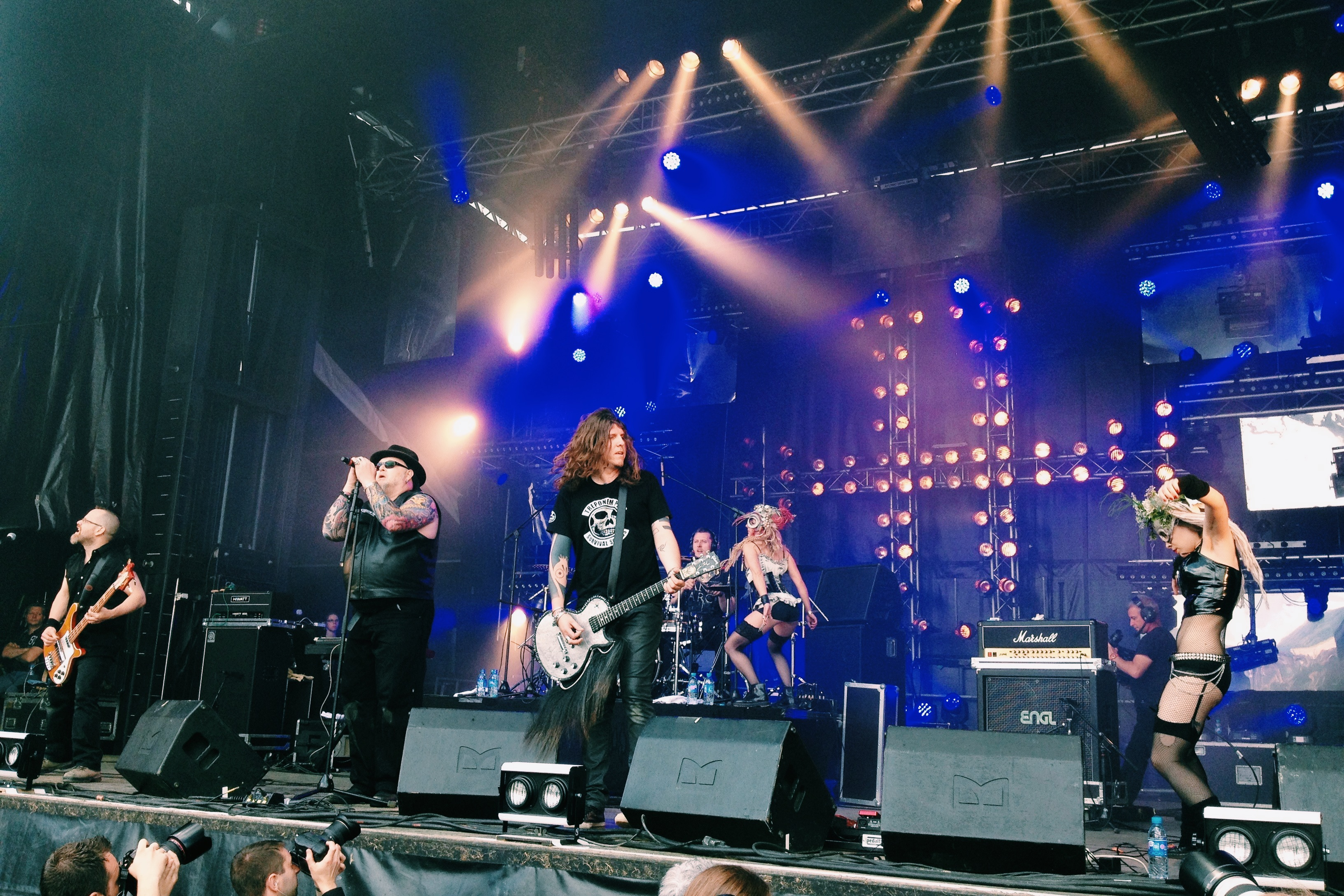
- Treponem Pal at Hellfest 2013

Background information
- Origin: Paris, France
- Genres: Industrial metal
- Years active: 1986–2001, 2006–present
- Labels: Roadrunner, PolyGram, Listenable, Juste Une Trace
- Members: Marco Neves; Polak; Didier Bréard; Mathys Dubois; Syn-Anton
- Past members: Michel Bassin; Laurent B; Alain Fornasari; Ferguson; Stéphane Cressend; Amadou Sall; David Lebrun; Didier Serbourdin; Goran Juresic
- Website: treponempal.com

Treponem Pal is a French industrial metal band formed in Paris in 1986. The current line-up of the band consists of Marco Neves (vocals), Polak (guitar), Didier Bréard (sampler), Mathys Dubois (drums) and Syn-Anton (bass). The band went through multiple line-up changes with Neves being the only constant member. The band is named after treponema pallidum, the bacterium that causes syphilis. The band's music was described as a mixture of "aggressive metal and a hint of industrial" similar to Godflesh and The Young Gods.

== History ==
Treponem Pal formed in France in 1986. Their first (Treponem Pal) and third (Excess & Overdrive) albums were produced by Franz Treichler (The Young Gods). Their second, Aggravation was produced by Roli Mosimann (Swans, Wiseblood). It was their third album, however, which was to prove most popular with fans. Live performances were notable due to their policy of employing two bass players which gave them a massive sound.

They maintained this style up until fourth album Higher, by which time the focus had shifted towards sampling and electronics, giving that album a more techno feel. Higher was produced by Sascha Konietzko from KMFDM.

The band then broke up, though vocalist Marco Neves and several other members formed a new band called Elephant System, which released one album produced by On-U Sound's Adrian Sherwood. This reflected Neves' longstanding interest in Jamaican and European dub as well as his work as a DJ and MC with the Dub Action Sound System and his involvement with the Hammerbass record label. Bass player Goran Juresic went in a more industrial dub direction with the band Lab° while drummer Didier Serbourdin formed the ultra-aggressive band 'Fast Forward' which combined hardcore techno beats with powerful metal guitars.

Treponem Pal returned with a new album in March 2008, entitled Weird Machine. The album featured Ted Parsons (from Swans and Prong) on drums and Paul Raven (from Killing Joke, Ministry and Prong) on bass, though tragically Raven suffered heart failure and died while collaborating with the band on the French-Swiss border. The album combined their earlier aggressive sound with more "rock" pieces as well as some "industrial ballads". The album was produced by David Weber and mastered by Maor Appelbaum.

== Band members ==
=== Line-up 2011 ===
- Marco Neves – vocals
- Polak – guitar
- Mathys Dubois – drums
- Didier Bréard – sampler
- Syn-Anton – bass

=== Former members ===
- Michel Bassin – guitar
- Laurent B. – guitars
- Alain "Ferguson" Fornasari – guitar, bass
- Stéphane Cressend – bass
- Amadou Sall – bass
- David Lebrun – drums
- Didier Serbourdin – drums
- Goran Juresic – bass

== Discography ==
=== Albums ===
- Treponem Pal (1989)
- Aggravation (1991)
- Excess & Overdrive (1993)
- Higher (1997)
- Weird Machine (2008)
- Survival Sounds (2012)
- Rockers Vibes (2017)
- Screamers (2023)

=== Remixes (albums) ===
- Panorama Remixes (1998)
- Evil Music For Evil People (Survival Sounds Remixes) (2013)

=== Singles ===
- "Pushing You Too Far" (1993)
- "Panorama Remixes" (1998)
- "Planet Crash" (2008)
