= Excess & Overdrive =

Studio album by Treponem Pal
- Released: 1993
- Studio: Studio des Forces Motrices (Geneva)
- Genre: Industrial metal
- Length: 58:34
- Label: Roadrunner
- Producer: Franz Treichler

Treponem Pal chronology
Aggravation (1991)	Excess & Overdrive (1993)	Higher (1997)

Singles from Excess & Overdrive
- 1. "Pushing You Too Far" Released: 1993

Excess & Overdrive is the third studio album by French industrial metal band Treponem Pal, released in 1993 on Roadrunner Records. The record was produced by The Young Gods singer Franz Treichler, with whom the band previously worked with on their 1989 debut. The track "Pushing You Too Far" was released as the album's lead single in 1993.

Being recorded after the band's 1992 Lollapalooza tour with Ministry, the album features elements from industrial music, hardcore and tribal music. The album was reissued with bonus tracks in 2009 by Metal Mind Productions.

== Critical reception ==
Professional ratings
Review scores
Source	Rating
AllMusic	4/5 stars
Deseret News	2.5/5 stars

AllMusic critic Romain Guillou described the record as the band's masterpiece and "a dark and powerful album," noting that the band's "compositions have now come to maturity" after the band's 1992 Lollapalooza tour. Guillou further wrote: "The vocal parts, deep and low, of Marco Neves may here be repellent at first for the listener not used to hardcore music, but the loud, intelligent guitars and the great quality of the songs will appeal to any industrial music lover." Alec of Foege of Spin thought that the record "immediately outplaces the impressively limber [1991's] Aggravation, perhaps due to Treichler's sharp-production," while stating that tight arrangements prevail over English-as-a-second-language lyrics on tracks such as "Out of Reach", "Pushing You Too Far" and "Stoned."

In a mixed review, Deseret News's Scott Iwasaki wrote that the record was "filled with sinister riffs and abysmal feedback, but as the album progresses, the music regresses." Nevertheless, Iwasaki thought that the record was "mixed and balanced well," with "the sound and feedback effects being skillfully used and taking the listener on a trip through the senses."

== Track listing ==
All music by Treponem Pal and all lyrics by Marco Neves, except where noted.

No.	Title	Lyrics	Music	Length
1.	"Out of Reach"		Laurent Bizet; Treponem Pal	4:27
2.	"Pushing You Too Far"			7:23
3.	"Excess and Overdrive"			4:37
4.	"For Progress"			4:12
5.	"Crimson Gardens"	Christel Lefebvre		7:27
6.	"Stoned"	Marco Neves; Lyn Pell-Wilson		4:31
7.	"Nowhere Land"			7:04
8.	"Blow Me Out"			6:26
9.	"Sometimes"		Laurent Bizet; Treponem Pal	4:20
10.	"Full Moon"	Christel Lefebvre		3:39
11.	"Excess (Trance Remix)"			4:28
Total length:				58:34

== Personnel ==
Album personnel as adapted from liner notes:

Treponem Pal

- Marco Neves — vocals
- Michel Bassin — guitar
- Alain Fornasari — guitar, bass
- Amadou Sall — bass
- Didier Serbourdin — drums

Other personnel

- J.P. Deslandes — sampler (2)
- Franz Treichler — producer
- David Weber — recording engineer
- Bertrand Siffert — mixing
- Kevin Metcalfe — mastering
- Remi Deluze — photography
- Nicolas Pierroz — artwork
- PJP Grax — artwork
- Jacques Rouxel — design
- Patrick Jammes — management
