= Kissing the Sun =

Single by The Young Gods

from the album Only Heaven
- Released: 6 November 1995
- Recorded: Eastside Sound and Bearsville Studio, New York
- Length: 4:30
- Label: PIAS/Interscope
- Songwriter: The Young Gods
- Producer: Roli Mosimann

The Young Gods singles chronology
"Gasoline Man" (1992)	"Kissing the Sun" (1995)	"Lucidogen" (2000)

"Kissing the Sun" is a single by The Young Gods appearing on their 1995 album Only Heaven.

Music video for the track was directed by Eric Zimmerman, who is known for his work on Nine Inch Nails's "Head Like a Hole" and Soundgarden's "Jesus Christ Pose".

== Track listing ==
1. "Kissing The Sun (Radio Edit)" – 3:40
2. "Lointaine (Instrumental)" – 4:20
3. "Kissing The Sun (Babylon By The Bay Mix)" – 6:08

== Accolades ==
Publication	Country	Accolade	Year	Rank
Melody Maker	United Kingdom	"Singles of the Year"	1995	26
