= Aggravation (album) =

Studio album by Treponem Pal
- Released: 1991
- Recorded: August 1990
- Studio: Artag Studio (Zürich)
- Genre: Industrial metal
- Length: 38:17
- Label: Roadracer
- Producer: Treponem Pal; Voco Fauxpas

Treponem Pal chronology
Treponem Pal (1989)	Aggravation (1991)	Excess & Overdrive (1993)

Aggravation is the second studio album by French industrial metal band Treponem Pal. It was released in 1991 on Roadracer Records. The record features contributions from producer Roli Mosimann and session work from the Celtic Frost drummer Stephen Priestly. The album also features a cover of Kraftwerk's 1976 track, "Radioactivity."

== Background and music ==
Following the release of 1989's Treponem Pal and accompanying touring, the band's bassist Stephane Cressend replaced Alain Ferguson in April 1990 and the band started recording Aggravation in Artag Studio in Zürich. Drummer David LeBrun left the band during the sessions; as a result, Celtic Frost drummer Stephen Priestly filled in for the recording sessions. The album was co-produced by Voco Fauxpas and mixed by former Swans member Roli Mosimann, the latter known for his work with The Young Gods, The The and Celtic Frost. Joining the band at the end of the recording sessions, Didier Serbourdin performed on the track "Out With No Flag."

Aggravation features elements from hardcore punk, industrial music, metal and thrash metal. The tracks "Rest Is War" and "What Does It Mean" were compared to the works of Foetus, while Neves' vocals on "Love" drew comparisons to Swans vocalist Michael Gira.

== Critical reception ==
Professional ratings
Review scores
Source	Rating
AllMusic	4.5/5 stars
Kerrang!	4/5

AllMusic critic John Book compared the record to the works of Ministry and thought that the album may appeal to the fans of Voivod and Godflesh. Mike Gitter of Kerrang! stated that with Aggravation, the band are "nicely sloping towards their own identity", citing the tracks "Fugitive Soul" and "Radioactivity." Sounds's Trish Jaega remarked that the record is "harder and heavier than before," while comparing the record to the "losing the suspense of Psycho and gaining the out and out gore of Hellraiser." Melody Maker critic Ngaire Ruth noted that "however loud, growling and gruesome this music is, it's never inaccessible." Ruth further stated: "If they sound this good on a low-budget album, God only knows what they are doing to people live." NME wrote that Treponem Pal has added an element of sick science to breed in the background of their songs, an ultimately sinister presence that slips unseen into the final mix." Metal Hammer called the record "extremely diverse but extremely good," writing that "the interesting mesh of styles [on the album] are given a further shake-up by Mosimann." Reviewing for Alternative Press Jason Pettigrew called the album as "soundtrack for a brutal attack" and "brooding and animalistic," further concluding it to be "an equivalent of a cluster bomb." Trouser Press critic Jem Aswad thought that the record offers a "offers an even more deeply distilled breed of hate, honed by an improved five-piece lineup and sharper production by Roli Mosimann," compared to the band's debut.

In 2010, the album was included on Spin's list of essential industrial metal albums. The curator and reviewer Chuck Eddy likened the record to "smart-bomb technology, scud-boom sludge and pagan-ritual sorties conducted as if frontman Marco Neves is singing through a gas mask." In 2011, Decibel critic Jeff Treppel wrote that the band "really harnessed an apocalyptic intensity" with Aggravation, "evoking Birmingham in 1980, but foreshadowing the sound of Chicago in 2010."

== Track listing ==
Al tracks written by Treponem Pal except where noted.

1. "Rest Is a War" — 4:27
2. "What Does It Mean" — 4:55
3. "Love" — 5:13
4. "Out With No Flag" — 4:35
5. "Fugitive Soul" — 3:10
6. "Sweet Coma" — 4:11
7. "TV Matic" — 1:10
8. "Radioactivity" (Hütter/Schneider/Schult) — 3:58
9. "You Got What You Deserve" — 6:33

== Personnel ==
Album credits as adapted from CD liner notes.

Treponem Pal

- Marco Neves — vocals
- Laurent B. — guitar
- Michel Bassin — guitar
- Alain Fornasari — bass composer (1–3, 5–7)
- David LeBrun — drum composer (1–3, 5–7)
- Stephane Cressend — bass
- Didier Serbourdin — drums

Other personnel

- Stephen Priestly — drums
- Roli Mosimann — mixing
- Voco Fauxpas — producer
- Treponem Pal — producer, engineer
- Lutin — sleeve design
- Alexis Lalande — photography
