= Live Noumatrouff, 1997 =

Live album by The Young Gods
- Released: May 15, 2001
- Recorded: Noumatrouff Mulhouse, France
- Genre: Industrial; Ambient
- Label: Intoxygene

The Young Gods chronology
Second Nature (2000)	Live Noumatrouff, 1997 (2001)	Music for Artificial Clouds (2004)

Live Noumatrouff, 1997 is a live album by Industrial band The Young Gods. It was recorded on September 27, 1997. This record was originally released as a gift for the audience of The Young Gods concert at Noumatrouff in Mulhouse, France, on May 6, 2000.

== Track listing ==
1. "Gasoline Man" - 4:36
2. "Dame Chance" - 5:16
3. "Moon Revolution" - 18:55
4. "The Dreamhouse" - 5:02
5. "Envoyé!" - 2:21
6. "Speed of Night" - 5:49
7. "L'Amourir" - 5:44
8. "Fais La Mouette" - 4:50
9. "Donnez Les Esprits" - 6:36

== Personnel ==
- Glenn McGaha Miller - Mastering
- Alain Monod - Keyboards, Producer, Mixing
- Roli Mosimann - Arranging
- Bertrand Siffert - Mixing
- Franz Treichler - Vocals
- Bernard Trontin - Drums
