= Agrovation =

Agrovation may refer to:

- Aggravation (disambiguation)
- Agro Vation, the putative full name of Agro (puppet), Australian puppet and media personality
