= Higher (Treponem Pal album) =

Studio album by Treponem Pal
- Released: 26 August 1997
- Studio: Soundhouse (Seattle, Washington)
- Genre: Industrial metal
- Length: 51:41
- Label: Mercury
- Producer: Sascha Konietzko

Treponem Pal chronology
| Excess & Overdrive (1993) | Higher (1997) | Weird Machine (2008) |

Singles from Higher
- 1. "Renegade" Released: 1997; 2. "Funk Me" Released: 1997; 3. "Funky Town" Released: 1998

Higher is the fourth studio album by French industrial metal band Treponem Pal, released on 26 August 1997, by Mercury Records. Being the band's major-label debut, the album was produced by KMFDM frontman Sascha Konietzko. The tracks "Renegade", "Funk Me" and the cover of Lipps Inc.'s "Funky Town" were released as singles; the remix EP Panorama Remixes was also released in 1998.

It is the band's last album before their 2001 hiatus, during which they formed the reggae band Elephant System. Treponem Pal resumed activity with a new line-up in 2006, releasing the follow-up record Weird Machine in 2008.

== Background and promotion ==
Sascha Konietzko was the band's first choice as a producer. Recording Higher in Seattle, the band sought to incorporate influences from reggae and dub, which they were fans of. In contrast to their previous album, Excess & Overdrive, the band simultaneously worked on samples and rock instrumentation instead of mixing in the samples later. In a retrospective interview, vocalist Marco Neves stated that working with Konietzko was "a bit painful" and "tough" "because we had to make him clear he was not producing a new album of KMFDM." Nevertheless, the band was satisfied with the record, with Neves further remarking: "the final result was exactly what we had in mind."

Compared to the band's previous albums on Roadrunner Records, the album was heavily promoted in France. Their 1997 live performance on the French prime time show Nulle part ailleurs as a part of the promotion attracted an obscenity controversy due to a cross-dressing dancer, as well as nudity and simulated sex acts.

== Critical reception ==
Professional ratings
Review scores
| Source | Rating |
|---|---|
| AllMusic | 2/5 stars |

AllMusic critic Victor W. Valdivia wrote that the band and producer Sascha Konietzko "hedged their bets by conventionalizing their sound," resulting in "an album that adds nothing new to the industrial genre" and features usual "heavy guitars, the monotone vocals, the techno rhythms and samples." Nevertheless, Valdivia also thought that "occasional lapses into reggae rhythms" on tracks "Struggle" and "Panorama" were distinguishing factors and concluded: "There's not much that's truly terrible, but there is also not much that's original, and precious little to indicate why this band is considered so influential." In a negative review, CMJ critic Ian Christie described the record as "a plodding barge of bawdy drum machine-rock wherein it plays the part of poor man's White Zombie."

== Track listing ==
All music by Treponem Pal and lyrics by Marco Neves, except where noted.

| No. | Title | Lyrics | Music | Length |
|---|---|---|---|---|
| 1. | "Cyberfreak" | | | 5:05 |
| 2. | "Renegade" | | | 3:16 |
| 3. | "Unchained" | | | 4:07 |
| 4. | "The Struggle" | | | 4:36 |
| 5. | "Lose Control" | | | 3:30 |
| 6. | "Panorama" | Christel Lefebvre; Marco Neves | | 4:47 |
| 7. | "Freetribe" | | | 5:06 |
| 8. | "Funk Me" | Christel Lefebvre; Marco Neves | | 5:58 |
| 9. | "Sick Train" | | | 3:59 |
| 10. | "Belief" | | | 3:19 |
| 11. | "Sweet Vibes" | Christel Lefebvre | | 4:31 |
| 12. | "Psycho Rising" | | | 3:30 |
| 13. | "Funky Town" | | Lipps Inc. | 5:07 |
| Total length: | | | | 51:41 |

== Personnel ==
Album personnel as adapted from liner notes:

Treponem Pal

- Marco Neves — vocals
- Didier Bréard — electronics, sampler
- Michel Bassin — guitar
- Goran Juresic — bass
- Didier Serbourdin — drums

Other personnel

- Jennifer Ginsberg — vocals (2)
- Mark Bentz — horns (4, 6)
- Zach Daves — horns (4, 6)
- Didier Tillit — violin (7)
- Margot Vignat — vocals (8)
- Sascha K. — producer, recording engineer, mixing
- Scott Crane — recording engineer
- Chris Shepard — mixing
- Sam Hofstedt — assistant mixing engineer

== Charts ==
| Chart (1997) | Peak position |
|---|---|
| CMJ Loud Rock | 14 |
