= Everybody Knows (The Young Gods album) =

Studio album by The Young Gods
- Released: November 5, 2010
- Recorded: ICP, Saraswati and Artamis Studios
- Genre: Industrial rock
- Length: 50:20
- Label: Two Gentlemen
- Producer: Roli Mosimann, Franz Treichler

The Young Gods chronology
Knock on Wood (2008)	Everybody Knows (2010)	Data Mirage Tangram (2019)

Professional ratings
Review scores
Source	Rating
Classic Rock	7/10 stars

Everybody Knows is the seventh studio album by post-industrial band The Young Gods.

== Track listing ==
All music written and performed by The Young Gods.

1. "Sirius Business" - 0:42
2. "Blooming" - 4:48
3. "No Land's Man" - 5:01
4. "Mister Sunshine" - 7:03
5. "Miles Away" - 9:58
6. "Two to Tango" - 3:35
7. "Introducing" - 3:53
8. "Tenter le Grillage" - 4:51
9. "Aux Anges" - 2:21
10. "Once Again" - 8:08
