= XXY =

XXY is the condition of having two X chromosomes and one Y chromosome.

- Klinefelter syndrome in males

== Other meanings of XXY ==
- XXY (film), a drama film about an intersex person
- XXY (album), an album by The Young Gods
- XXY, a New York dance and music troupe consisting of Cyndi Lee, Mary Ellen Strom and Pierce Turner that did the choreography for Cyndi Lauper's music-video to Girls Just Want to Have Fun
