= Aggravation =

Aggravation may refer to:

== Events ==
- Aggravation (law) of a crime
- Aggravation of a symptom

== Titled works ==
=== Music ===
- Aggravation (1991 album), by Treponem Pal
- "Aggravation" (1966), single by Chris Curtis, an English musician
- "Aggravation" (1973), song by Martha Veléz, an American singer
- "Aggravation" (1989), song on UK Jive, by The Kinks

=== Other media ===
- Aggravation (1896), a painting by Briton Rivière, English artist
- Aggravation (board game), with marbles as well
