= Illidiance =

Russian metal band

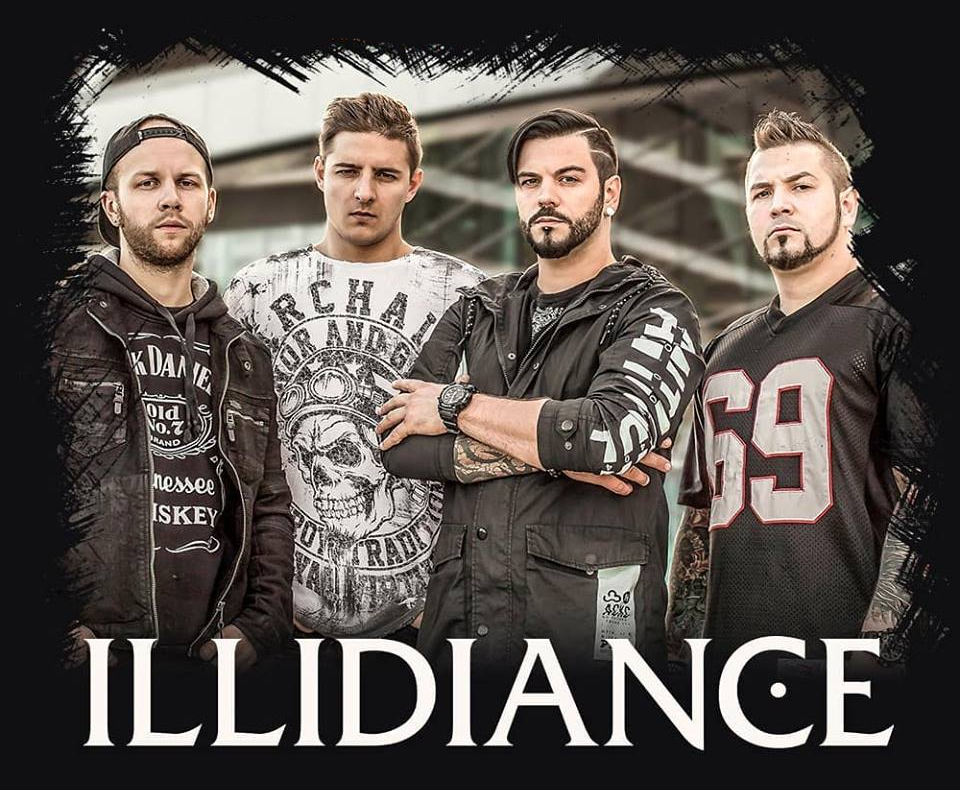

Background information
- Origin: Taganrog, Russia
- Genres: Industrial metal; cyber metal; black metal (early)
- Years active: 2004-present
- Labels: The Flaming Arts Agency, Mazzar Records, Right Recordings, Wave Master
- Members: Xyrohn; Syrex; Cyclonez; Slay
- Past members: Viper; Sockor; Razor; Nemesis; Infinity
- Website: illidiance.ru

Illidiance is an industrial metal band from Taganrog, Russia. The band was founded in 2004 as the successor of the black metal band S.C.A.R.D. They picked up where S.C.A.R.D. left off stylistically with their first EP Withering Razors and debut album Insane Mytheries to Demise. With their next album Nexaeon in 2007, they started hinting at a more melodic cyber metal direction, fully establishing this different sound in their 2009 EP Synthetic Breed. All four songs from the EP were re-recorded as part of their 2010 album Damage Theory, which was reissued via Right Recordings in 2012. They have since released two more full-length albums: "The Iconoclast" and "Oceanborn".

As of January 2016, the first three albums by Illidiance sold over 6 000 copies.

== Current members ==
- Dmitry "Xyrohn" Shkurin — vocals, guitar
- Artem "Syrex" Shkurin — vocals, guitar
- Anton "Cyclonez" Brezhnev — drums
- Vyacheslav "Slay" — bass

== Discography ==
=== Albums ===
- Insane Mytheries to Demise (2005)
- Nexaeon (2007)
- Damage Theory (2010)
- The Iconoclast (2019)
- Oceanborn (acoustic album) (2022)

=== EPs ===
- Withering Razors (2005)
- Cybergore Generation (2009)
- Synthetic Breed (2009)
- Deformity (2013)

=== Singles ===
- New Millenium Crushers (2010)
- Neon Rebels (2012)
- Shockwave (2014)
- Modern Iconoclast (2016)
- Когда грянет гром (When There Is A Thunder) (2018)
- Последний рассвет (Last Dawn) (2018)
- Fuel from My Hate (2018)
- Out of Coverage (2018)
- The Witcher (2020)
- Breaking The Habit (2020)
- Open Your Eyes (2020)
- Hack the Hoax (feat. Jot Maxi from Hacktivist) (2022)

=== Compilations ===
- Damage & Deform (2014)
