= Skinflowers =

Single by The Young Gods

from the album T.V. Sky
- Released: January 1992
- Recorded: CP Studio Brussels
- Genre: Industrial
- Length: 5:08
- Label: PIAS
- Songwriter: The Young Gods
- Producer: Roli Mosimann

The Young Gods singles chronology
"Longue Route" (1990)	"Skinflowers" (1992)	"Gasoline Man" (1992)

"Skinflowers" is a single by The Young Gods appearing on their 1992 album T.V. Sky. It later appeared on the soundtrack of the 1993 film Sliver.

== Cover versions ==
Faith No More, who has cited The Young Gods as an influence, has performed the song live a few times.

== Accolades ==
Year	Publication	Country	Accolade	Rank
2004	Kerrang!	United Kingdom	"666 Songs You Must Own (Alternative Rock)"	*

* denotes an unordered list.

== Track listing ==
1. "Skinflowers (Edited Version)" – 4:04
2. "Skinflowers (Brain Forest Mix (The Orb Style))" – 7:26
3. "Skinflowers (Courtney Speed Love Mix)" – 3:53
4. "Skinflowers (Album Version)" – 5:08
