= Heaven Deconstruction =

Studio album by The Young Gods
- Released: 1996/July 29, 1997
- Recorded: Relief Studio and Studios Des Forces Motrices
- Genre: Industrial; Experimental; Rock
- Label: PIAS/Mutant Sound System

The Young Gods chronology
Only Heaven (1995)	Heaven Deconstruction (1996)	Second Nature (2000)

Professional ratings
Review scores
Source	Rating
Muzik	7/10
NME	6/10

Heaven Deconstruction is an experimental instrumental album by The Young Gods released on July 29, 1997.

== Track listing ==
1. "December" - 6:04
2. "Aoaçu" - 2:48
3. "Acid Strangel" - 5:27
4. "Improper" - 5:25
5. "Drun" - 4:37
6. "Riversky" - 4:49
7. "F" - 3:21
8. "Borea" - 4:58
9. "Scories" - 0:56
10. "Landing" - 5:51
11. "Messages" - 3:11
12. "Nano Pata" - 1:48
13. "Lova" - 4:45
14. "Light Residues" - 2:24
15. "Under" - 6:15
16. "Numière" - 6:39
17. "Windklang" - 4:25
