= Only Heaven =

Studio album by The Young Gods
- Released: June 27, 1995
- Studio: Eastside Sound and Bearsville Studio, New York
- Genre: Post-industrial; ambient; industrial rock
- Length: 61:13
- Label: PIAS/Interscope
- Producer: Roli Mosimann

The Young Gods chronology
Live Sky Tour (1993)	Only Heaven (1995)	Heaven Deconstruction (1996)

Alternative Cover
- Interscope Records cover

Singles from Only Heaven
- 1. "Kissing the Sun" Released: 1995; 2. "Kissing the Sun (Remix)" Released: November 6, 1995

Professional ratings
Review scores
Source	Rating
AllMusic	4.5/5 stars
Spin	4/5 stars

Only Heaven is the fourth album by industrial band The Young Gods. It was released in 1995 on Interscope Records.

== Background ==
The album was conceived and recorded solely in the United States, which was a first for the band. Live instrumentals were played at Eastside Studios, while the majority of sound manipulations were carried out at the rented New York loft. As the band later reflected, frontman Franz Treichler took control of the creative side of the project, while producer Roli Mosimann handled the more technical aspects.

== Accolades ==
Publication	Country	Accolade	Year	Rank
Melody Maker	United Kingdom	"Albums of the Year"	1995	17
Ned Raggett	United States	"The Top 136 Albums of the Nineties"	1999	71

== Track listing ==
1. "Outside" - 0:31
2. "Strangel" - 3:07
3. "Speed of Night" - 6:00
4. "Donnez Les Esprits" - 6:17
5. "Moon Revolutions" - 16:35
6. "Kissing the Sun" - 4:30
7. "The Dreamhouse" - 4:52
8. "Lointaine" - 4:20
9. "Gardez Les Esprits" - 1:08
10. "Child in the Tree" - 4:35
11. "Kissing The Sun (Orange Mix)" - 9:18 (bonus track on some releases)

== Charts ==
Chart	Peak position
Swiss Albums Chart	11
Dutch Albums Chart	85

== Personnel ==
The Young Gods

- Urs Hiestand – drums
- Alain Monod – keyboards
- Franz Treichler – vocals

Additional musicians and production

- Erwin Autique – engineering
- Yaron Fuchs – engineering
- Chris Laidlaw – assistant engineering
- Roli Mosimann – production, mixing
- Gary Townsley – assistant engineering
- Howie Weinberg – mastering
