= Super Ready/Fragmenté =

Studio album by The Young Gods
- Released: April 16, 2007
- Recorded: Relief Studio & TYG Studio, Artamis, Switzerland
- Genre: Industrial rock
- Label: Ipecac Recordings (IPC88) (CD)
- Producer: Roli Mosimann

The Young Gods chronology
XXY (2005)	Super Ready/Fragmenté (2007)	Knock on Wood (2008)

Professional ratings
Review scores
Source	Rating
BBC	Mixed
The Guardian	4/5 stars

Super Ready/Fragmenté is the sixth album by Industrial band The Young Gods.

== Track listing ==
1. "I'm The Drug" – 3:05
2. "Freeze" – 2:36
3. "C'est Quoi C’est Ça" – 4:04
4. "El Magnifico" – 3:28
5. "Stay With Us" – 4:31
6. "About Time" – 5:20
7. "Machine Arrière" – 1:03
8. "The Color Code" – 5:27
9. "Super Ready/Fragmenté" – 8:59
10. "Secret"* – 3:42
11. "Everythere" – 3:49
12. "Un Point C’est Tout" – 5:18
- original (slightly different version) on the compilation album XXY

== Personnel ==
- Al Comet (Alain Monod) – Keyboards
- Yannick Gremaud – Assistant Engineering
- George Marino – Mastering
- Roli Mosimann – Producer, Mixing
- Benoît Saillet – Assistant Engineering
- Bertrand Siffert – Engineering
- Franz Treichler – Vocals
- Bernard Trontin – Drums
