= Knock on Wood (The Young Gods album) =

Live album by The Young Gods
- Released: April 21, 2008
- Recorded: 2006–2007
- Genre: Rock
- Label: Play It Again Sam

The Young Gods chronology
Super Ready/Fragmenté (2007)	Knock on Wood (2008)	Everybody Knows (2010)

Knock On Wood is an album by the Swiss musical group The Young Gods. The album was recorded entirely with acoustic instruments and has a more relaxed mood than their typical industrial rock material.

== CD track listing ==
1. Our House
2. I'm The Drug
3. Everythere
4. Gasoline Man
5. Speak Low (Nash/Weill)
6. Charlotte
7. Ghost Rider (Suicide)
8. Longue Route
9. She Rains
10. Freedom (Richie Havens)
11. Skinflowers

== DVD track listing ==
Live At Moods

1. I'm The Drug
2. Gasoline Man
3. Speak Low
4. Ghost Rider
5. Longue Route
6. She Rains
7. Everything In Its Right Place (Radiohead)
8. If Six Was Nine (Jimi Hendrix)

Take Away Shows

1. Charlotte
2. I'm The Drug
3. Gasoline Man

== LP track listing ==
1A

1. Our House (5:38)
2. Everythere (4:43)
3. Gasoline Man (5:07)

1B

1. Speak Low (5:00)
2. Charlotte (2:07)
3. Longue Route (4:22)
4. She Rains (5:28)

2A

1. Skinflowers (4:20)
2. I'm The Drug (2:55)
3. Freedom (4:03)
4. Stay With Us (4:20)

2B

1. Ghostrider (12:02)

== Credits ==
Main Performer

- Franz Treichler - Guitar, percussion, vocals/
- Al Comet - Guitar, percussion/
- Bernard Trontin - drums, percussion/

Additional personnel

- Vincent Hänni - Guitar
