= Music for Artificial Clouds =

Studio album by The Young Gods
- Released: March 16, 2004
- Recorded: TYG Studio Artamis & Boa Studio
- Genres: Ambient, experimental, instrumental
- Label: Intoxygene

The Young Gods chronology
| Live Noumatrouff, 1997 (2001) | Music for Artificial Clouds (2004) | XXY (2005) |

Music for Artificial Clouds is an experimental instrumental album by The Young Gods.

Kristoffer Noheden of Release Magazine rated the album a 6 out of 10, calling it a "fine ambient album".

== Track listing ==
1. "Eregeen" - 6:40
2. "Oxiam" - 6:11
3. "Arcia" - 6:19
4. "Ophiushi" - 4:42
5. "Pompom Girl" - 6:16
6. "Iwasi" - 5:27
7. "Tangram" - 4:20
8. "Dew Point Five" - 8:13
9. "Double Moon" - 4:30
10. "Paucari" - 8:29
11. "Magnetosphere" - 4:27
12. "Sandvaten" - 4:46

== Personnel ==
- Glenn Miller - Mastering
- Alain Monod - Keyboards
- Franz Treichler - Vocals
- Bernard Trontin - Drums
