= L'Amourir =

Single by The Young Gods

from the album L'Eau Rouge
- B-side: "Pas Mal"
- Released: August 1988
- Recorded: Artag Studio, Studio Zürich
- Genre: Industrial
- Length: 4:18
- Label: PIAS
- Songwriter(s): The Young Gods
- Producer(s): Roli Mosimann

The Young Gods singles chronology
"Did You Miss Me?" (1987)	"L'Amourir" (1988)	"Longue Route" (1990)

"L'Amourir" is a single by The Young Gods released in 1988. It later appeared on the re-issue of their second album L'Eau Rouge in 1995.

== Accolades ==
Publication	Country	Accolade	Year	Rank
Best	France	"Singles of the Year"	1988	2
Melody Maker	United Kingdom	"Singles of the Year"	1988	6

== Track listing ==
1. "L'Amourir" - 4:18
2. "Pas Mal" - 2:46

== Charts ==
Chart (1988)	Peak position
UK Indie Chart	8
