= Live Sky Tour =

Live album by The Young Gods
- Released: July 13, 1993
- Recorded: Sarah Sands Hotel, Melbourne, Australia
- Genre: Industrial; Ambient
- Length: 58:04
- Label: PIAS
- Producer: Alain Monod; Bertrand Siffert

The Young Gods chronology
T.V. Sky (1992)	Live Sky Tour (1993)	Only Heaven (1995)

Professional ratings
Review scores
Source	Rating
Allmusic	4/5 stars

Live Sky Tour is a live album by Industrial band The Young Gods covering their 1992 tour in support of their album T.V. Sky. It was recorded on May 30, 1992.

== Track listing ==
1. "Intro" – 2:49
2. "T.V. Sky" – 3:49
3. "Jimmy" – 2:37
4. "Envoyé!/Chanson Rouge" – 5:02
5. "L'Eau Rouge" – 3:43
6. "Skinflowers" – 5:23
7. "She Rains" – 2:50
8. "Summer Eyes" – 13:40
9. "Pas Mal" – 2:58
10. "Longue Route" – 4:48
11. "September Song" – 4:00
12. "Seeräuber Jenny" – 6:25

== Personnel ==
- Al Mono (Alain Monod) – Keyboards, Producer, Mixing
- Üse Drums (Urs Hiestand) – Drums
- Phil McKellar – Recording
- Kevin Metcalfe – Mastering
- Franz Reise (Franz Treichler) – Vocals
- Bertrand Siffert – Producer, Mixing
