= The Young Gods (album) =

Studio album by the Young Gods
- Released: April 1987
- Recorded: Artag Studio (Zurich)
- Genre: Industrial rock; avant-garde; industrial metal
- Length: 34:10
- Label: Play It Again Sam; Organik; Wax Trax!
- Producer: Roli Mosimann

The Young Gods chronology
The Young Gods (1987)	L'eau rouge (1989)

Singles from The Young Gods
- 1. "Did You Miss Me?" Released: February 1987

The Young Gods is the debut studio album by the Swiss industrial rock band the Young Gods, released in 1987 by Play It Again Sam, Organik and Wax Trax! Records. The album employs a sample-based approach to rock music: the tracks are composed from samples from metal guitar riffs and classical compositions. The Young Gods was produced by Roli Mosimann, who went on to become a frequent collaborator of the band. It is the band's only record to feature their original drummer, Frank Bagnoud.

The Young Gods met with a critical acclaim, with a particular interest from the British music press: it was named as the "Album of the Year" by Melody Maker. The album peaked at number 14 on UK Independent Albums Chart, while its sole single, "Did You Miss Me?", charted on the UK Independent Singles Chart.

== Background and recording ==
The Young Gods formed in Geneva in 1985, after Fribourg-native guitarist Franz Treichler decided to assemble a band for his sound collage compositions. The band started rehearsing and performing with the inclusion of sampler player Cesare Pizzi and drummer Frank Bagnoud. After a series of early gigs, the trio signed to the Swiss label Organik, which was a subsidiary of RecRec Music. Their self-financed debut single, "Envoyé!", was released in 1986 to positive reviews and publicity. It was named as "the Single of the Week" by Melody Maker; the band soon started touring in Europe and the United Kingdom. The success of the single won the band a recording deal with the Belgian label Play It Again Sam.

The band soon started recording their debut album with Roli Mosimann. Treichler had previously met with Mosimann during the latter's tenure as the drummer of Swans. The album was recorded at the Artag Studio in Zurich, Switzerland. According to Treichler, Mosimann was heavily involved in the songwriting and arrangement process.

== Music and lyrics ==
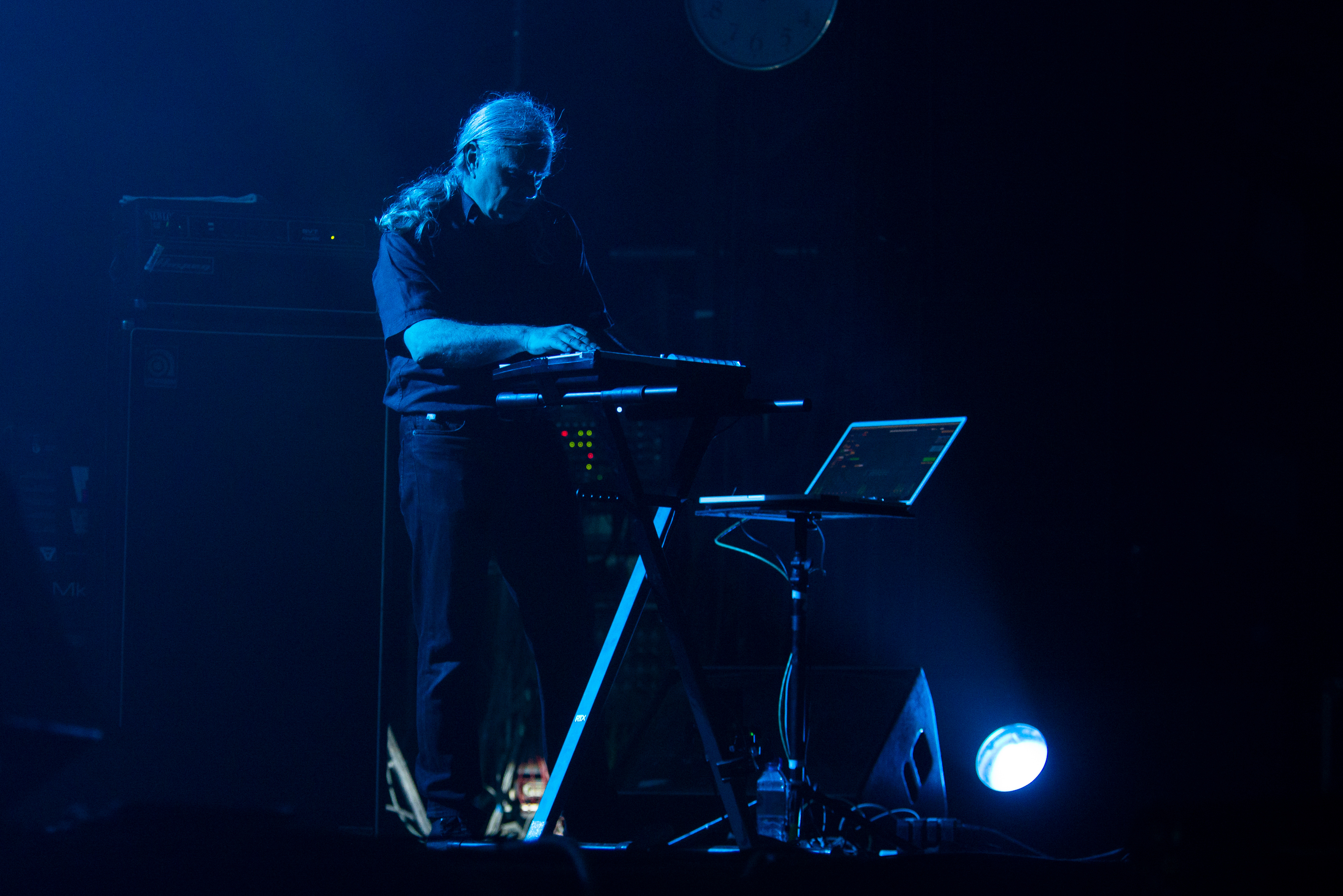
The band's sampler player, Cesare Pizzi, in 2019

On The Young Gods, the band used the sampler as a compositional tool: the tracks are constructed from classical and rock/metal guitar samples. On the band's arrangements, David Stubbs of The Quietus wrote: "They used artifice and synthesis, mechanically retrieving the sounds of the dead rock (and classical) past, but forging them in such a way as to create something bold, grandiose and absolutely new under the sun." Treichler's vocals were described as "leering" and "guttural". The tracks often deviate from the standard verse–chorus form. The band have described their music as "new sonic architecture".

The track "Nous de la lune" features a martial beat, tolling bells, and "a vomiting, bass growl" by Treichler. "Jusqu'au About" was characterized by "exhaust fume sputters of revving guitar", while the track "A ciel ouvert" features "Treichler's melodramatic, pterodactyl-like screams". "Did You Miss Me?", a cover of Gary Glitter's "Hello, Hello, I'm Back Again", was constructed from string samples and was compared to the works of Laibach. The track features an audience sample from a Yello live album. "Jimmy" was described as a "furious punk" track. The tracks "Percussione" and "Feu" are driven by "primitive, muscle-powered percussion" and "a looped riff", respectively. "Envoyé!", featured on the CD version, consists of a "motorik percussion, gunshots, an abbreviated hair metal riff"; the track was likened to "techno played by a speed-metal band". "Comme si était la dernière fois", another CD bonus track, features a slowed down guitar riff from The Ruts.

The lyrics on The Young Gods are sung in French, except for "Did You Miss Me?" and "The Irrtum Boys".

== Release and reception ==
Professional ratings
Review scores
Source	Rating
AllMusic	3.5/5 stars
Robert Christgau	(choice cut)
Uncut	5/5 stars

The Young Gods was released in April 1987 on Play It Again Sam and Organik. Wax Trax! Records handled the North American release. The record received a critical success in the United Kingdom and peaked at number 14 on UK Independent Albums Chart. The band regularly relocated to London for the accompanying tour.

AllMusic critic Ned Raggett wrote: "Even if the uniqueness of the Young Gods' sample-based compositional and playing method of heavy rock wasn't a question, the band's debut would still have caught many a discerning ear." Raggett further added: "While not consistently strong throughout, this self-titled effort has far more hits than misses to its overall credit." Music critic Robert Christgau noted the tracks "Feu" and "Did You Miss Me" as notable cuts from the record. Simon Reynolds of Melody Maker praised the record, stating that the record "looks like the most creative record released this year". Reynolds further stated that the band "takes sampling beyond the dance functionalism which limits hip hop. Where most pop is linear, horizontal, The Young Gods open up space along the vertical." Trouser Press wrote: "'Bombastic' would be a gross understatement, but when ability matches ambition, The Young Gods has a uniquely menacing majesty."

The album was chosen as the "Album of the Year" by Melody Maker in 1987. It was also included on Sounds magazine's lists of "Albums of the Year" and "The Top 80 Albums from the '80s" in 1987 and 1989, respectively. In 2010, Spin featured the record on its list of essential industrial metal albums.

Al Jourgensen of Ministry cited the album as an influence on Ministry's music.

== Track listing ==
All tracks are written by The Young Gods, except "Did You Miss Me?" by Gary Glitter and Mike Leander.

Side one
No.	Title	Length
1.	"Nous de la lune" ("We of the Moon")	4:33
2.	"Jusqu'au bout" ("All the Way")	2:35
3.	"A ciel ouvert" ("In the Open Air")	1:46
4.	"Jimmy"	2:41
5.	"Fais la mouette" ("Do the Seagull")	4:46

Side two
No.	Title	Length
1.	"Percussionne" ("Percussion" (Note: Translated as "Let the Trial Begin" on the liner notes.))	5:28
2.	"Feu" ("Of Old")	3:04
3.	"Did You Miss Me?" (Gary Glitter cover)	3:22
4.	"Si tu gardes" ("If You Keep")	5:55

CD bonus tracks
No.	Title	Length
10.	"The Irrtum Boys"	2:38
11.	"Envoyé!" ("Sent" (Note: Translated as "Go For It and Fuck Off" on the liner notes.))	1:53
12.	"Soul Idiot"	4:23
13.	"Comme si c'était la dernière fois" ("As If It Were the Last Time")	5:09

== Personnel ==
Adapted from The Young Gods liner notes.

The Young Gods

- Frank Bagnoud – drums
- Cesare Pizzi – sampler
- Franz Treichler – vocals

Production and additional personnel

- Voco Fauxpas – assistant engineer
- Jean-Marc Giossi – photography
- Roli Mosimann – production, engineering, trumpet (A5)
- The Young Gods – cover art, design

== Chart positions ==
Chart (1987)	Peak position
Swiss Albums (Schweizer Hitparade)	22
UK Indie Chart	14

== Release history ==
Region	Date	Label	Format	Catalog	Notes
Belgium	1987	PIAS	CD, LP	LD 8821	
Switzerland	1987	Organik	CD, LP	ORG 87/9	
United States	1987	Wax Trax!	CD, LP	WAX 7135	
United States	1995	Interscope	CD	92653	
France	2001	Intoxygene	CD	LD 8821	
Europe	2012	Two Gentlemen	CD	TWOGTL 018	Deluxe edition; includes the previously unreleased live album, Live at Fri-Son (1987)
Europe	2021	Two Gentlemen	LP	TWOGTL 081	Double LP; includes the previously unreleased Peel session from 1988
