= The Young Gods Play Kurt Weill =

Play Kurt Weill

Studio album of cover songs by The Young Gods
- Released: April 1991
- Recorded: Artag Studio (Zurich, CH)
- Genre: Dark cabaret, industrial rock
- Length: 32:33
- Label: PIAS
- Producer: Roli Mosimann

The Young Gods chronology
L'Eau Rouge (1989)	Play Kurt Weill (1991)	T.V. Sky (1992)

Professional ratings
Review scores
Source	Rating
Allmusic	4/5 stars

Play Kurt Weill is a cover album released by Swiss Industrial band The Young Gods. The album comprises interpretations of pieces by German composer Kurt Weill. The band played the entire track list during the Kurt Weill tribute concert in Switzerland in September 1989.

A remastered version was released in 2021, for the album's 30th anniversary.

== Track listing ==
All music is composed by Kurt Weill.

No.	Title	Length
1.	"Prologue"	1:46
2.	"Salomon Song"	4:07
3.	"Mackie Messer"	4:13
4.	"Speak Low"	5:14
5.	"Alabama Song"	5:51
6.	"Seeräuber Jenny"	5:52
7.	"Ouverture"	2:50
8.	"September Song"	2:47

== Personnel ==
Adapted from the liner notes of The Young Gods Play Kurt Weill.

The Young Gods

- Alain Monod – keyboards
- Use Hiestand – drums
- Franz Treichler – vocals

Production and additional personnel

- Voco Fauxpas – engineering
- Roli Mosimann – production
- Howie Weinberg – mastering

== Release history ==
Region	Date	Label	Format	Catalog
Belgium	1991	PIAS	CD, CS, LP	BIAS 188
United States	1995	Interscope	CD	92630
