= T.V. Sky =

Studio album by The Young Gods
- Released: 7 February 1992
- Recorded: CP Studio Brussels
- Genres: Industrial rock, industrial metal, techno
- Length: 48:15
- Label: PIAS
- Producer: Roli Mosimann

The Young Gods chronology
| The Young Gods Play Kurt Weill (1991) | T.V. Sky (1992) | Live Sky Tour (1993) |

Singles from T.V. Sky
- 1. "Skinflowers" Released: January 1992; 2. "Gasoline Man" Released: September 1992

T.V. Sky is the third album by the industrial band The Young Gods, released on 7 February 1992 through PIAS Recordings.

== Critical reception ==
Professional ratings
Review scores
| Source | Rating |
|---|---|
| AllMusic | 4.5/5 stars |
| Metal Forces | 70/100 |
| Music From the Empty Quarter | Favourable |
| Rock Hard | 8.5/10 |

=== Accolades ===
| Year | Publication | Country | Accolade | Rank |
|---|---|---|---|---|
| 1999 | Ned Raggett | United States | "The Top 136 Albums of the Nineties" | 14 |
| 2000 | Kerrang! | United Kingdom | "200 Albums For The Year 2000 (Industrial)" | 8 |
| 2000 | Terrorizer | United Kingdom | "100 Most Important Albums of the Nineties" | * |
| 2005 | Rock Hard | Germany | "The 500 Greatest Rock & Metal Albums of All Time" | 315 |

== Track listing ==
| No. | Title | Length |
|---|---|---|
| 1. | "Our House" | 2:52 |
| 2. | "Gasoline Man" | 4:22 |
| 3. | "T.V. Sky" | 3:48 |
| 4. | "Skinflowers" | 5:09 |
| 5. | "Dame Chance" | 5:02 |
| 6. | "The Night Dance" | 4:19 |
| 7. | "She Rains" | 2:48 |
| 8. | "Summer Eyes" | 19:55 |

== Chart performance ==
| Chart | Peak |
|---|---|
| Swiss Album Chart | 26 |
| UK Albums Chart | 54 |

== Personnel ==
The Young Gods

- Urs Hiestand – drums
- Alain Monod – keyboards
- Franz Treichler – vocals

Additional musicians and production

- Erwin Autique – engineering
- Roli Mosimann – production
