= L'eau rouge =

Studio album by The Young Gods
- Released: September 1989
- Recorded: Artag Studio (Zurich, CH)
- Genre: Industrial rock, dark cabaret, symphonic metal
- Length: 33:46; 40:50 (CD release)
- Label: PIAS
- Producer: Roli Mosimann

The Young Gods chronology
The Young Gods (1987)	L'eau rouge (1989)	The Young Gods Play Kurt Weill (1991)

Singles from L'eau rouge
- 1. "Longue route (Remix)" Released: March 1990

L'eau rouge (French for The Red Water) is the second album by industrial band The Young Gods, released in September 1989 by Play It Again Sam Records. It is usually referred to as their masterpiece and was included in 1001 Albums You Must Hear Before You Die in 2005.

== Track listing ==
All lyrics are written by Franz Treichler; all music is composed by The Young Gods.

Side one
No.	Title	Length
1.	"La fille de la mort" ("The Daughter of Death")	7:58
2.	"Rue des Tempêtes" ("Tempest Street")	2:51
3.	"L'eau rouge" ("The Red Water")	4:20
4.	"Charlotte"	2:01

Side two
No.	Title	Length
1.	"Longue route" ("Long Route")	3:41
2.	"Crier les chiens" ("Screaming the Dogs")	3:15
3.	"Ville nôtre" ("City of Ours")	4:07
4.	"Les enfants" ("The Children")	5:33

CD bonus tracks
No.	Title	Length
9.	"L'Amourir" ("The Love Beat")	4:18
10.	"Pas Mal" ("Not Bad")	2:46

== Personnel ==
Adapted from the L'eau rouge liner notes.

The Young Gods

- Cesare Pizzi – keyboards
- Use Hiestand – drums
- Franz Treichler – vocals

Production and additional personnel

- Michele Amar – programming
- Voco Fauxpas – engineering
- Roli Mosimann – production

== Charts ==
Chart (1989)	Peak position
UK Indie Chart	3

== Reception ==
Professional ratings
Review scores
Source	Rating
Allmusic	4.5/5 stars

=== Accolades ===
Year	Publication	Country	Accolade	Rank
1989	Tip	Germany	"Albums of the Year" (Hanspeter Künzler)	1
1989	Tip	Germany	"Albums of the Year" (Christina Moles Kaup)	1
1989	Melody Maker	United Kingdom	"Albums of the Year"	7
1989	Sounds	United Kingdom	"Albums of the Year"	24
1989	OOR	Netherlands	"Albums of the Year"	31
2000	Terrorizer	United Kingdom	"100 Most Important Albums of the Eighties"	*
2005	1001 Albums You Must Hear Before You Die	United Kingdom	"1001 Albums You Must Hear Before You Die"	*
2021	Metal Hammer	United Kingdom	The 25 Best Symphonic Metal Albums	22
"*" denotes an unordered list.

== Release history ==
Region	Date	Label	Format	Catalog
Belgium	1989	PIAS	CD, CS, LP	BIAS 130
United States	1995	Interscope	CD	92629
