= Industrial metal =

Music genre; fusion of heavy metal and industrial music

- Stylistic origins: Heavy metal; industrial; industrial rock
- Cultural origins: Late 1980s; United Kingdom, United States, Germany, and Switzerland
- Derivative forms: Nu metal

Subgenres
- Cyber metal; Neue Deutsche Härte

Other topics
- Alternative metal; avant-garde metal; NWOAHM; thrash metal; synth-metal

Industrial metal is the fusion of heavy metal and industrial music, typically employing repeating metal guitar riffs, sampling, synthesizer or sequencer lines, and distorted vocals. Prominent industrial metal acts include Ministry, Nine Inch Nails, Fear Factory, Rammstein, KMFDM, and Godflesh.

Industrial metal developed in the late 1980s, as industrial and metal began to fuse into a common genre. Industrial metal did well in the 1990s, with the success of acts such as Nine Inch Nails, Ministry, Marilyn Manson, Rammstein and Rob Zombie.

== History ==
=== Early innovators ===
Though electric guitars had been used by industrial artists since the early days of the genre, archetypal industrial groups such as Throbbing Gristle displayed a strong anti-rock stance. British post-punk band Killing Joke pioneered the crossing over between styles and was an influence on major acts associated with industrial metal such as Ministry, Godflesh, and Nine Inch Nails. Another pioneer industrial rock group, Big Black, also impacted some later groups.

By the late 1980s industrial and heavy metal began to fuse into a common genre, with Godflesh's self-titled EP and Ministry's The Land of Rape and Honey at the forefront. Godflesh was founded by former Napalm Death guitarist Justin Broadrick. Drawing from a wide array of influences—power electronics forefathers Whitehouse, noise rock band Swans, ambient music creator Brian Eno and fellow Birmingham metallers Black Sabbath—the Godflesh sound was once described as "Pornography-era The Cure on Quaaludes". Though not a top seller, Godflesh nonetheless became an influential act, their name mentioned by Korn, Metallica, Danzig, Faith No More, and Fear Factory.

Ministry emerged from the scene surrounding Wax Trax! Records, a Chicago indie label dedicated to industrial music. Ministry's initial foray into guitar rock happened during a recording session of The Land of Rape and Honey on Southern Studios, in London. The band's frontman, the Cuban-born Al Jourgensen, explained this transition:

Rediscovering the guitar on this record was almost like the first day I got my Fairlight. The possibilities just seemed endless on something that had seemed so limiting before. That's really funny. I started out as a guitarist, but I hadn't really touched a guitar in five years. Then I heard that first feedback come out of the Marshall stack and all of a sudden it was like there was a whole new parameter within guitar playing itself – especially in combination with sounds that you get out of a keyboard.

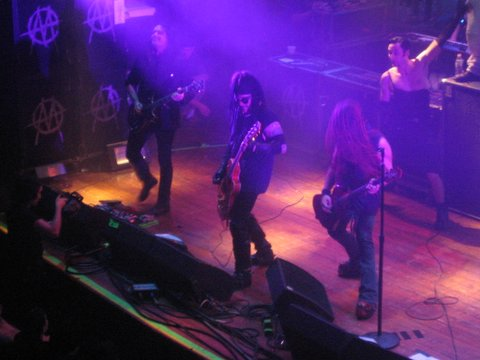
Al Jourgensen (center) with Revolting Cocks

Jourgensen seemed particularly fond of thrash metal. After the release of Land, he recruited guitarist Mike Scaccia from Texas thrashers Rigor Mortis. On one occasion, Jourgensen told the press that Sepultura was his favorite band. He also expressed the desire to produce a Metallica album. Jourgensen's interest in dance-oriented electronic music did not entirely fade, however; he also formed the side-project Revolting Cocks, a more electronic body music-inflected collaboration with Richard23 of Front 242.

German band KMFDM was another seminal industrial metal group. Although not a metal fan, KMFDM leader Sascha Konietzko's "infatuation with ripping off metal licks" stemmed from his experiments with E-mu's Emax sampler in late 1986. He told Guitar World that,

It was just interesting to use it as a kind of white noise reinforcement for our music. All of a sudden heavy metal was free from all those tempo changes and boring attitudes it always had. What I always hated most about heavy metal was that the best riffs came only once and were never repeated. So the fascination, actually, was to sample a great riff, loop it, and play it over and over again.

A Swiss trio, The Young Gods, brushed with the style on their second album, L'Eau Rouge (1989). Prior to its release, singer Franz Treichler declared:

We just wanted to hear guitars. We missed the attack of 'Envoyé'. That's what we want to hear right now, pure power. A metal sound that isn't revivalist, isn't biker style, speed metal style, any style, just WHAP!

Canadian thrash metal band Malhavoc became one of the earlier acts of the genre when they began to mix extreme metal with industrial music in the late 1980s.

Pigface, formed by Martin Atkins and including Ministry drummer Bill Rieflin, emerged as an industrial metal collective of sorts, participating with many figures from the noise rock and industrial worlds. Nine Inch Nails, the "one-man-band" formed by Trent Reznor, brought the genre to mainstream audiences with albums such as the Grammy-winning Broken and the best-selling The Downward Spiral, accompanied by their groundbreaking performance at Woodstock '94. The rivethead subculture also developed at this time, along with the so-called "coldwave" subgenre, which encompassed Chemlab, 16 Volt, and Acumen Nation. Some electro-industrial groups adopted industrial metal techniques in this period, including Skinny Puppy (on their Rabies, co-produced by Jourgensen), and Front Line Assembly.

British band Pitchshifter, formed in 1989 by brothers Jon and Mark Clayden, also started as an industrial metal band. The band later included elements of drum and bass. Frontman JS mentions:

[...]In the early days we were inspired by bands like Head of David and Swans and the like... coming out of punk into the weird, angry, total noise, kind of pre-industrial music. It gets called industrial but I don't know if it really is.

=== Industrial thrash and death metal ===
Industrial metal's popularity led a number of successful thrash metal groups, including Megadeth, Sepultura, and Anthrax, to request remixes by "industrial" artists. Some musicians emerging from the death metal scene, such as Fear Factory, Nailbomb, Autokrator and Meathook Seed, also began to experiment with industrial. Fear Factory, from Los Angeles, were initially influenced by the Earache roster (namely Godflesh, Napalm Death and Bolt Thrower). The German band Oomph! after their second album Sperm started to play industrial metal combined with elements of death metal and groove metal until the album Plastik. Sepultura singer Max Cavalera's Nailbomb, a collaboration with Alex Newport, also practiced a combination of extreme metal and industrial production techniques. Obituary guitarist Trevor Peres suggested drum machines for The End Complete, Obituary's most successful album; however the other band members' refusal led him to form Meathook Seed.

=== Industrial black metal ===
In the early years of the 21st century, groups from the black metal scene began to incorporate elements of industrial music. Mysticum, formed in 1991, was the first of these groups. DHG (Dødheimsgard), Thorns from Norway and Blut Aus Nord, N.K.V.D. and Blacklodge from France, have been acclaimed for their incorporation of industrial elements. Other industrial black metal musicians include Aborym, and ...And Oceans. In addition, The Kovenant, Mortiis and Ulver emerged from the Norwegian black metal scene, but later chose to experiment with industrial music.

=== Progressive industrial metal ===
Several artists with their roots in progressive music, though not often associated with industrial metal scene, also incorporated industrial textures into their music. Later-era King Crimson, whose 2000s albums were referred as "industrial art metal", and OSI can be named as examples of progressive industrial metal. Several acts associated with extreme metal subgenres also mix progressive and avant-garde metal with industrial, those include the Hungarian experimental metal act Thy Catafalque, Blut aus Nord and Norwegian band Shining with their critically acclaimed Blackjazz album, which blended progressive rock, black metal, free jazz and industrial. Canadian artist Devin Townsend, the founder of industrial thrash metal band Strapping Young Lad, later fused industrial with progressive metal during his prolific solo career. Synthetic Breed and The Interbeing have also fused industrial with progressive metal.

=== Coldwave ===
Coldwave
- Stylistic origins: Industrial metal; hard rock; acid house; cyberpunk; pop; punk rock
- Cultural origins: Early-1990s

Other topics
- Synth-rock; synth-metal; synth-pop

Coldwave is a subgenre of industrial metal originating in the 1990s. It has its roots in acts like Nine Inch Nails and Ministry. The style focuses on heavier, punk-based guitars, sampled hard rock-like guitars, synthesizer accompaniment, and acid house elements. Lyrical content is typically cyberpunk-oriented with pop music sensibilities, although it can vary.

Chemlab's 1993 album Burn Out at the Hydrogen Bar is often considered the album that defined the coldwave style.

Artists like the aforementioned Chemlab, 16 Volt and Acumen Nation exemplified this genre.

The coldwave style began to wane rapidly when industrial music in general started to lose popularity in the latter half of the 1990s-early 2000's. Many artists within the genre moved on to different styles that included Hard rock, heavy metal, nu metal, cyber metal, synth-metal, synth-rock, and synth-pop among other genres.

Coldwave today is a small, niche scene within industrial music. Very few bands today describe themselves or are described as coldwave. Bands like Cyanotic and Medicant Downline are perhaps the exception.

Despite sharing the same name as the French genre, it is otherwise unrelated.

=== Cyber metal ===
Cyber metal
- Stylistic origins: Industrial metal; EBM; aggrotech; extreme metal; symphonic metal
- Cultural origins: Mid-late 1990s and early 2000s, United States, Scandinavia, Switzerland, and Finland

Cyber metal is a subgenre of industrial metal which incorporates numerous elements found predominantly in EBM and aggrotech, including the use of more melodic and less repetitive riffs, in opposition to mostly metallic and mechanical sound of industrial music, coined by Fear Factory in the mid-90s. The Kovenant was the first band to develop cyber metal with some of its more well-known aspects: harsh vocals, extreme guitar melodies, and symphonic keyboards. A wave of other bands described as cyber metal would follow, including Deathstars, Mnemic, Sybreed, Turmion Kätilöt, Illidiance, Xe-NONE, Cypecore, Mechina, and Neurotech.

=== Commercial rise ===
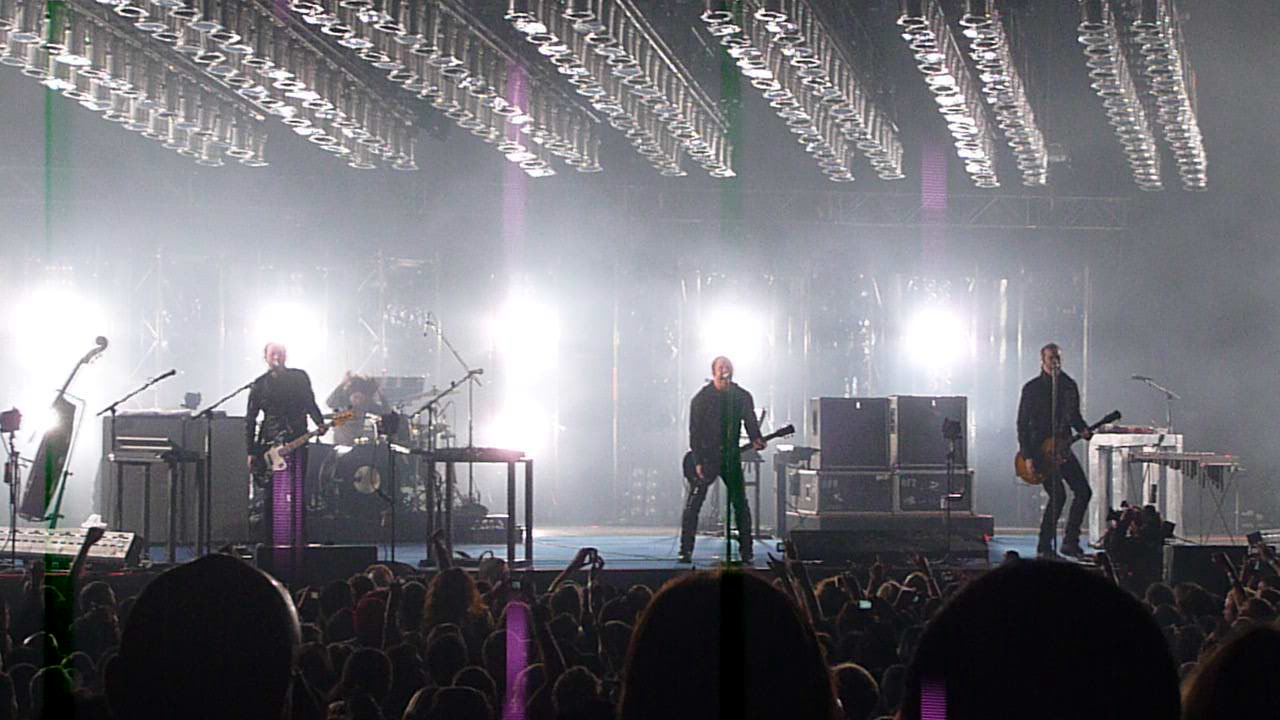
Nine Inch Nails in concert, 2009

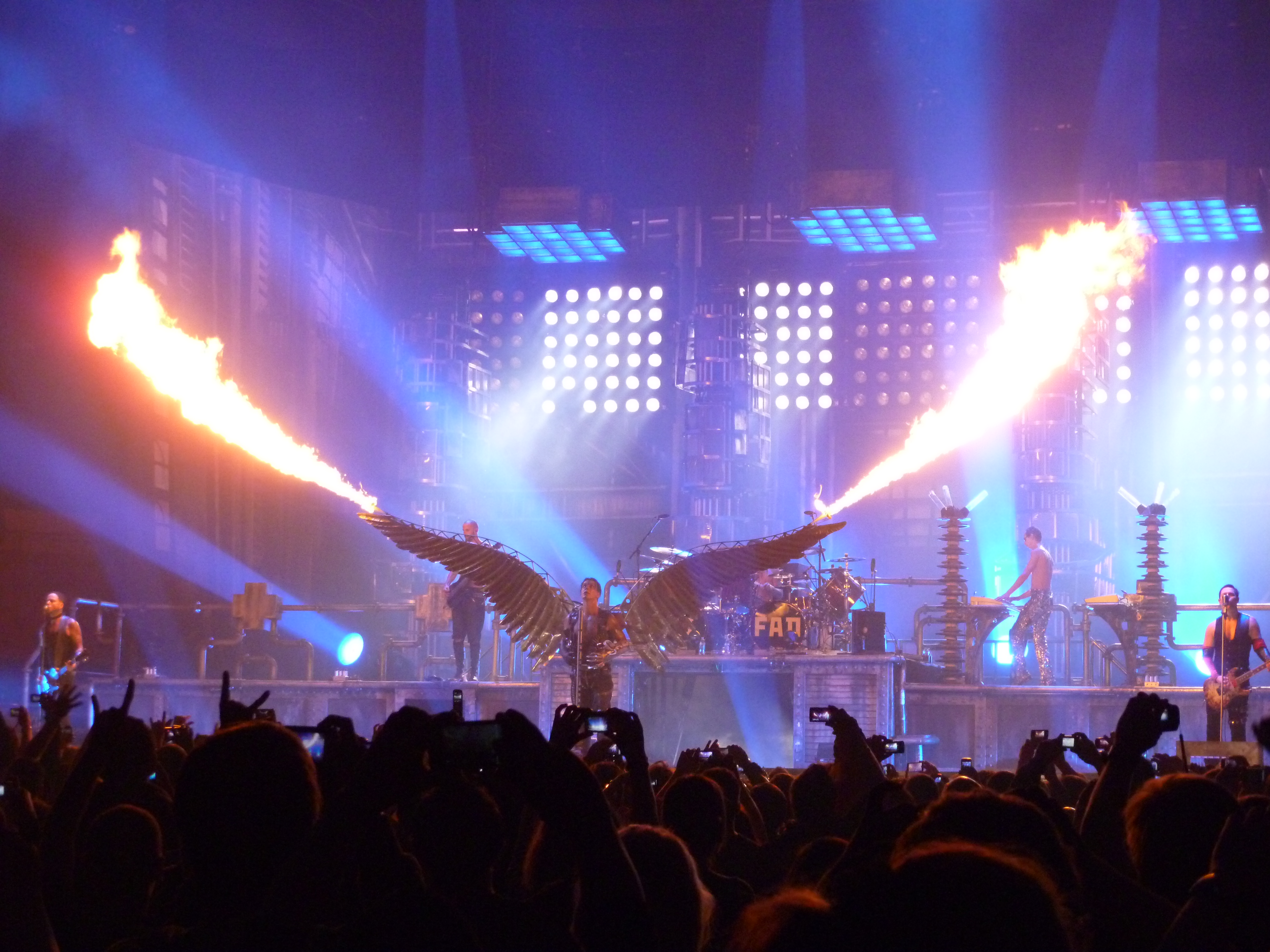
Rammstein Live at Madison Square Garden

Industrial metal blossomed in the early 1990s, particularly in North America, where it would eventually sell close to 35 million units. It first became a commercial force in 1992 when Nine Inch Nails' Broken and Ministry's Psalm 69 went platinum in America, though the latter took three years to reach that status. Both groups were nominated for the Best Metal Performance in the 1992 Grammy Awards, with Nine Inch Nails winning. Two years later, Nine Inch Nails released The Downward Spiral, which debuted at No. 2, and would eventually go quadruple-platinum. This record is considered by AllMusic as "one of the bleakest multi-platinum albums ever".

Overall, popular heavy rock music has changed to become more "industrialized". This robbed the industrial hardcore movement of any hopes of establishing a new identity of its own. The style is dead (or at least dying); the elements of the style continue on in new musical settings.

— David A. Locher, Professor of Sociology, Missouri State University, 1998

Following Nine Inch Nails' success, Marilyn Manson, led by a protégé of Reznor's, came to prominence. The group's live performance and its transgressive appeal was often more commented on than their music.

Industrial metal reached its commercial zenith in the latter half of the 1990s – according to the RIAA databases, its top-selling artists sold around 17.5 million units combined. Records by major industrial metal artists routinely debuted on the top spots of the Billboard 200 chart: Rob Zombie's Hellbilly Deluxe (No. 5), Marilyn Manson's Antichrist Superstar (No. 3), and Nine Inch Nails' The Fragile (No. 1). A number of industrial metal albums performed well on Billboard's Heatseekers chart: Filter's Short Bus (No. 3), Stabbing Westward's Wither Blister Burn + Peel (No. 1), Rammstein's Sehnsucht (No. 2), Orgy's Candyass (No. 1), and Static-X's Wisconsin Death Trip (No. 1).

During this era, Trent Reznor was chosen by Time as one of the most influential Americans of 1997. The genre's popularity was such that established glam metal groups, including Guns N' Roses and Mötley Crüe, began to dabble in the style. Figures from the hip hop scene also began to seek out collaborations with and remixes from industrial metal musicians.

When industrial metal climbed the charts of the late 1990s, its sudden popularity was met with negative reactions from the early innovators of industrial music. Peter Christopherson told The Wire that he no longer felt any kinship with the industrial scene: "this is not me, this is not what I'm about". Lustmord, a prominent early industrial musician, declared that "Ministry just doesn't interest [him]" and "[he has] no time for all this rock and roll shit they're doing now." Skinny Puppy frontman Nivek Ogre dismissed Nine Inch Nails as "cock rock" but have since patched things up and have even performed on stage together.

Industrial metal suffered a critical backlash at the turn of the millennium. In an April 2000 review for the Chicago Sun Times, Jim DeRogatis dismissed Nine Inch Nails' new music as a "generic brand of industrial thrash" and accused Ministry of repeating an act that "was old by 1992". Although The Fragile reached the top spot of the Billboard 200 and went on to earn double platinum status, DeRogatis considered it a "flop" nonetheless. Around this time, veteran industrial metal artists (Ministry, Godflesh, and White Zombie) began to repudiate the industrial label. Sales remained high throughout 2000–2005; at least 10 million records were sold during that time frame. Many groups began to take influence from hip hop and electronic music, in addition to industrial metal. As a result, acts like Powerman 5000 are often described as industrial metal as well as nu metal.

== Film and video ==
Several industrial metal groups have produced eye-catching videos. These include Godflesh's collaboration with Andres Serrano, Aidan Hughes's graphics for KMFDM, Nine Inch Nails' work with Mark Romanek, Rob Zombie's visual work for White Zombie (for which he received the MTV Video Music Award for Best Hard Rock Video), and Marilyn Manson's output with Richard Kern and Floria Sigismondi. NIN later collaborated with Bill Viola for live accompaniment. Trent Reznor also produced the soundtracks for the films Natural Born Killers and Lost Highway, and served as "musical consultant" for Man on Fire. Rob Zombie has directed three films. In 2009, Marilyn Manson was in the process of directing Phantasmagoria: The Visions of Lewis Carroll. The movie has since languished in development hell. Other films that have included prominent contributions from industrial metal artists include The Crow, Johnny Mnemonic, Hideaway, (Mortal Kombat/1997 sequel), The Matrix, Blair Witch and A.I. Artificial Intelligence.

== Controversy ==
Its emphasis on transgressive themes has made a few industrial metal groups vulnerable to attack from American social conservatives. For example, Sen. Bob Dole, then head of the Republican Party, sharply criticized Time Warner after a meeting between Michael J. Fuchs (head of the Warner Music Group), William Bennett, and C. Delores Tucker, at which Tucker and Bennett demanded that Fuchs read lyrics from NIN's "Big Man with a Gun". A year later, Bennett, Tucker, and Joseph Lieberman launched a similar campaign against MCA Records for their distribution of Marilyn Manson's music. Many of his concerts were cancelled by authorities after this uproar. In addition, Dennis Cooper cited Ministry's video for "Just One Fix", which featured footage of William S. Burroughs, as an early example of heroin chic. Some initial reports claimed that Columbine High School shooters Eric Harris and Dylan Klebold were Marilyn Manson fans. In fact, they preferred KMFDM and Rammstein. Asa Coon, another school shooter, was a Manson fan. Manson, a former journalist, published a detailed response to the controversy following the Columbine shootings in an article published in Rolling Stone. It concluded:

I think that the National Rifle Association is far too powerful to take on, so most people choose Doom, The Basketball Diaries or yours truly. This kind of controversy does not help me sell records or tickets, and I wouldn't want it to. I'm a controversial artist, one who dares to have an opinion and bothers to create music and videos that challenge people's ideas in a world that is watered-down and hollow. In my work I examine the America we live in, and I've always tried to show people that the devil we blame our atrocities on is really just each one of us. [...]

Sascha Konietzko reported that KMFDM was "sick and appalled" by the shootings, issuing a statement the following day saying:

First and foremost, KMFDM would like to express their deep and heartfelt sympathy for the parents, families and friends of the murdered and injured children in Littleton. We are sick and appalled, as is the rest of the nation, by what took place in Colorado yesterday. KMFDM are an art form – not a political party. From the beginning, our music has been a statement against war, oppression, fascism and violence against others. While some of the former band members are German as reported in the media, none of us condone any Nazi beliefs whatsoever.

Rammstein stated that they "have no lyrical content or political beliefs that could have possibly influenced such behavior". Rammstein have also been controversial for their use of Nazi imagery, including footage shot by Leni Riefenstahl for Olympia in their video for "Stripped". Alec Empire, a German digital hardcore musician, declared that "[Rammstein is] successful for all the wrong reasons. I think they're not a fascist band at all, but I think in Germany there's a lot of misunderstanding and that's why they sell records and I think that's dangerous." In response to the controversy, Rammstein stated that "We are not Nazis, Neo-Nazis, or any other kind of Nazi. We are against racism, bigotry or any other type of discrimination." The band went on to create the song "Links 2-3-4", released in 2001, which responded to the Nazi allegations by insinuating that they reside left on the political spectrum.

== See also ==
- List of industrial metal bands
- Heavy metal music
- List of industrial music festivals
- List of heavy metal festivals
