= Second Nature (The Young Gods album) =

Studio album by The Young Gods
- Released: Original; October 30, 2000; Re-Issue; January 28, 2003
- Recorded: Relief Studio SA, Belfaux, Switzerland
- Genre: Post-industrial; Electronica
- Length: 52:08
- Label: Intoxygene; Ipecac Recordings (IPC36) (CD)
- Producer: Franz Treichler

The Young Gods chronology
Heaven Deconstruction (1996)	Second Nature (2000)	Live Noumatrouff, 1997 (2001)

Alternative Cover
- Ipecac Records cover

Singles from Second Nature
- 1. "Lucidogen" Released: May 15, 2000

Professional ratings
Review scores
Source	Rating
Allmusic	4/5 stars

Second Nature is the fifth album by Industrial band The Young Gods.

== Track listing ==
1. "Lucidogen" – 4:10
2. "Supersonic" – 4:19
3. "Laisser Couler (Le Son)" – 5:42
4. "Astronomic" – 5:45
5. "Attends" – 4:01
6. "In The Otherland" – 7:34
7. "Stick Around" – 2:53
8. "The Sound In Your Eyes" – 5:58
9. "Toi Du Monde" – 8:08
10. "Love 2.7" – 3:40

== Accolades ==
Publication	Country	Accolade	Year	Rank
Terrorizer	United Kingdom	"Albums of the Year"	2000	31

== Chart performance ==
=== Album ===
Chart	Peak
Swiss Album Chart	59

== Personnel ==
The Young Gods

- Alain Monod – keyboards
- Franz Treichler – vocals, production
- Bernard Trontin – drums

Additional musicians and production

- Bertrand Siffert – engineering
- Benoît Saillet – assistant engineering
- Glenn Miller – mastering
- René Walker – artwork
