= The Young Gods =

Swiss rock band

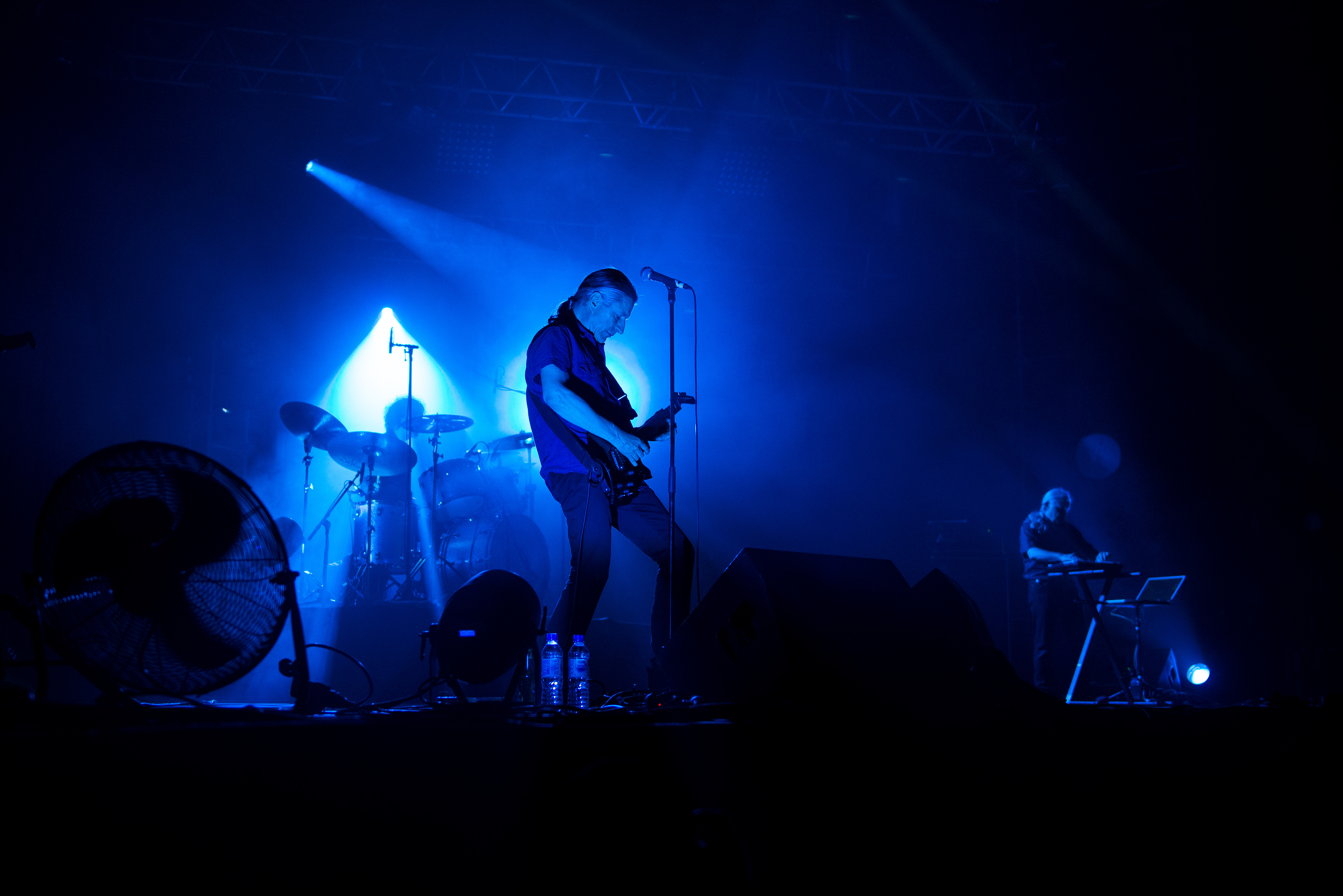
- The Young Gods performing at Hellfest 2019. From left to right, Trontin, Treichler, Pizzi.

Background information
- Origin: Geneva, Switzerland
- Genres: Industrial rock; industrial; avant-rock; post-industrial
- Years active: 1985–present
- Labels: Organik; Wax Trax!; Play It Again Sam; Interscope; Ipecac; Intoxygene; Make Up; Two Gentlemen
- Members: Franz Treichler; Bernard Trontin; Cesare Pizzi
- Past members: Frank Bagnoud; Urs Hiestand; Alain Monod; Vincent Hänni
- Website: younggods.com

The Young Gods are a Swiss industrial rock band from Fribourg, formed in 1985. The original lineup of the band featured singer Franz Treichler, sampler player Cesare Pizzi and drummer Frank Bagnoud. For most of their history, the band maintained a trio format with a singer, a sampler player and a drummer, albeit with multiple line-up changes. Treichler is the band's sole consistent member; the current line-up also features Pizzi and drummer Bernard Trontin. During their career, the band have extensively collaborated with producer Roli Mosimann.

The band's music is largely based on sampling and sound manipulation; the tracks are constructed from various samples, such as distorted guitar riffs and string sections. Their later releases have incorporated elements from ambient and electronic music. Their sample-based approach to rock music influenced numerous musicians such as David Bowie, The Edge and Mike Patton.

== History ==
=== Formation, The Young Gods and L'eau rouge (1985–1991) ===
Circa 1984, Fribourg-native guitarist Franz Treichler relocated to Geneva and started experimenting with sound collages on his 4-track recorder, following the dissolution of his punk band Jof & The Ram, previously known as Johnny Furgler & the Raclette Machine. Inspired by the sampling synthesizer E-mu Emulator, he started composing songs from these sound collages in early 1985 and introduced his roommate, former the Raclette Machine bassist Cesare Pizzi, to the sampler. The band started rehearsing with the addition of drummer Frank Bagnoud, who previously played in the same band as Pizzi.

The band took their name from the track "Young God" from Swans's 1984 EP of the same name; Treichler was exposed to the track after booking the band for a performance in Switzerland in 1984. The band made their live debut in the late 1985. Their early performances were mostly guerrilla gigs, in which the band played at squats, factories and occupied public places illegally. In these very early performances, Pizzi operated the samples through tape-playing keyboards and a loop pedal; the samples were stored in cassettes and taped through an answering machine. While they were able to obtain an Akai sampler after 10 performances, their debut single "Envoyé" was produced with this setup. The band signed to Belgian Play It Again Sam record label after the release of "Envoyé" on Organik and Wax Trax! Records in 1986. A music video for the track was also produced. The single cover art featured the band's logo carved onto Treichler's chest; in 2005, he stated that the scar "disappeared after five or six years". For their debut album, the band started working with former Swans member Roli Mosimann, who went on to become a long-time studio collaborator. The band's self-titled debut was released in 1987 to critical acclaim in the United Kingdom: the record was named as the best album of 1987 by music magazine Melody Maker. "Did You Miss Me?", a Gary Glitter cover from the album, was released as an accompanying single. During this period, the band regularly relocated to London.

Bagnoud left the band in 1987. Drummer Urs Hiestand then joined the band and the band began working on the follow-up album with Mosimann. The drumming duties were first offered to Bernard Trontin, a friend of Treichler and band's then-future drummer; he refused due to his conflicting touring schedule. L'eau rouge was released in 1989 on Play It Again Sam, with non-album track "L'Amourir" and "Longue route" as singles. Like its predecessor, the record ranked among the year's best on Melody Maker. Pizzi departed the band following the release of the album and was replaced by Alain Monod, who performed on the subsequent tour. The tour featured the band's first performances in the United States. Kurt Weill's "September Song" became a staple of the band's live set; they subsequently performed covers of Weill's compositions on Switzerland's Festival du Bois de la Bâtie. The studio versions of the tracks were released as The Young Gods Play Kurt Weill in 1991.

=== T.V. Sky, Only Heaven and Heaven Deconstruction (1992–1997) ===
External videos
- Official music video for "Skinflowers", which was described as an underground hit.

For the recording of the band's fourth album with Mosimann, Treichler located to New York, where he subsequently lived for a couple of years; other members joined them for six months. The band's first English-language album, T.V. Sky, was released in 1992, with the single "Skinflowers" becoming an underground hit. North American leg of the accompanying tour was documented on the television documentary TV-Sky - The Young Gods US Tour 92. The band's 1992 live performance in Australia was released as the live album Live Sky Tour in 1993.

Amidst the commercial success of acts such as Nine Inch Nails, the band signed to Interscope Records. As a part of the label's request, the band worked with a sample clearance expert. The band's ambient-influenced record, Only Heaven, was released in 1995. Music video for the album's lead single, "Kissing the Sun", was directed by Eric Zimmerman of H-Gun, who is known for his work on Nine Inch Nails's "Head Like a Hole" and Soundgarden's "Jesus Christ Pose". To support Only Heaven, the band joined Ministry's 1996 tour, touring extensively for two years. Hiestand, feeling that the touring lifestyle was tiring, left the band in 1996. Treichler and Monod, then living in New York, regarded his departure as a sign and relocated back to Switzerland. To fill in for drumming duties, Bernard Trontin joined the band in 1997.

A companion record to Only Heaven, titled Heaven Deconstruction, was independently released in 1996. The instrumental album featured fully-ambient compositions and soundscapes produced during Only Heaven recording sessions. Treichler originally anticipated Only Heaven to be a double album featuring those outtakes; nevertheless, Interscope vetoed the idea. Towards the end of the decade, the label dropped the band, citing low commercial performance. During this time, the band entered a lawsuit with their former label, Play It Again Sam, regarding their contract.

=== Second Nature, Super Ready/Fragmenté and Everybody Knows (1998–2011) ===
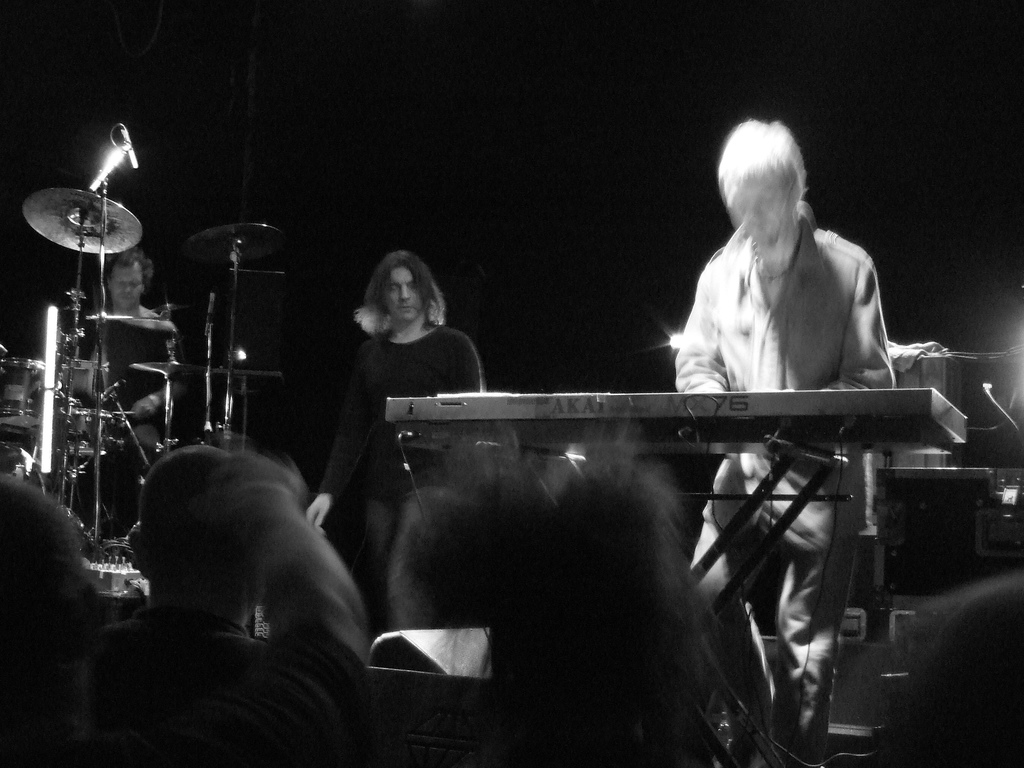
The Young Gods in 2007. From left to right: Trontin, Treichler, Monod

In 2000, the band released their electronic music-influenced seventh album, Second Nature. Citing the past problems with major labels such as Play It Again Sam, the band sought to release their album on their manager's label, Intoxygene, which Treichler subsequently regretted. The track "Lucidogen" was also released as a single in that year. Following the release of the 2001 live album Live Noumatrouff, 1997, the band was commissioned to compose instrumentals for Swiss Federal Office of Public Health at Expo.02; these compositions were later reinterpreted and released under the name Music for Artificial Clouds in 2004. The record was later performed live as a part of which was a collaboration with anthropologist Jeremy Narby. In 2003, Ipecac Recordings issued Second Nature in North America.

Between 2003 and 2004, the band was left without a manager and a label. In 2005, the band started working on new material and released the compilation album XXY: 20 Years (1985-2005), featuring career highlights and rarities. The album was released on Play It Again Sam with a new track, titled "Secret", as a promotional single. In that year, the band played their anniversary shows in Montreux Jazz Festival and Willisau, Switzerland, followed by a European tour in November. The band's performance in Montreux, which was a collaboration with Lausanne Sinfonietta and featured guest vocals from Mike Patton, was later released as a live album in 2010. The band's former drummer, Frank Bagnoud, died after a long illness in June.

In 2006, the band issued Truce Diaries, which was recorded exclusively for the Swiss magazine Truce. The following year's Super Ready/Fragmenté marked a return to a guitar-oriented sound in contrast to Second Nature. Around this time, multi-instrumentalist Vincent Hänni started collaborating with the band, eventually becoming a full member. In 2008, the band released Knock on Wood, which featured acoustic interpretations of their past material. The band paid homage to the original Woodstock festival at their 2009 Paléo Festival gig, scoring the documentary Woodstock live with samples from the original artists. Hänni was involved in the recording of the band's tenth studio album, 2010's Everybody Knows; the band sought an improvisation-oriented direction with the addition of a fourth member. The record was succeeded by live albums, Super Ready/Fragmenté Tour – Live at Rote Fabrik, Zürich and Griots and Gods – Live at Eurockéennes Festival, Belfort; the latter featured the live collaboration between the band and experimental hip hop duo Dälek at Eurockéennes 2007.

=== Pizzi's return and Data Mirage Tangram (2012–present) ===
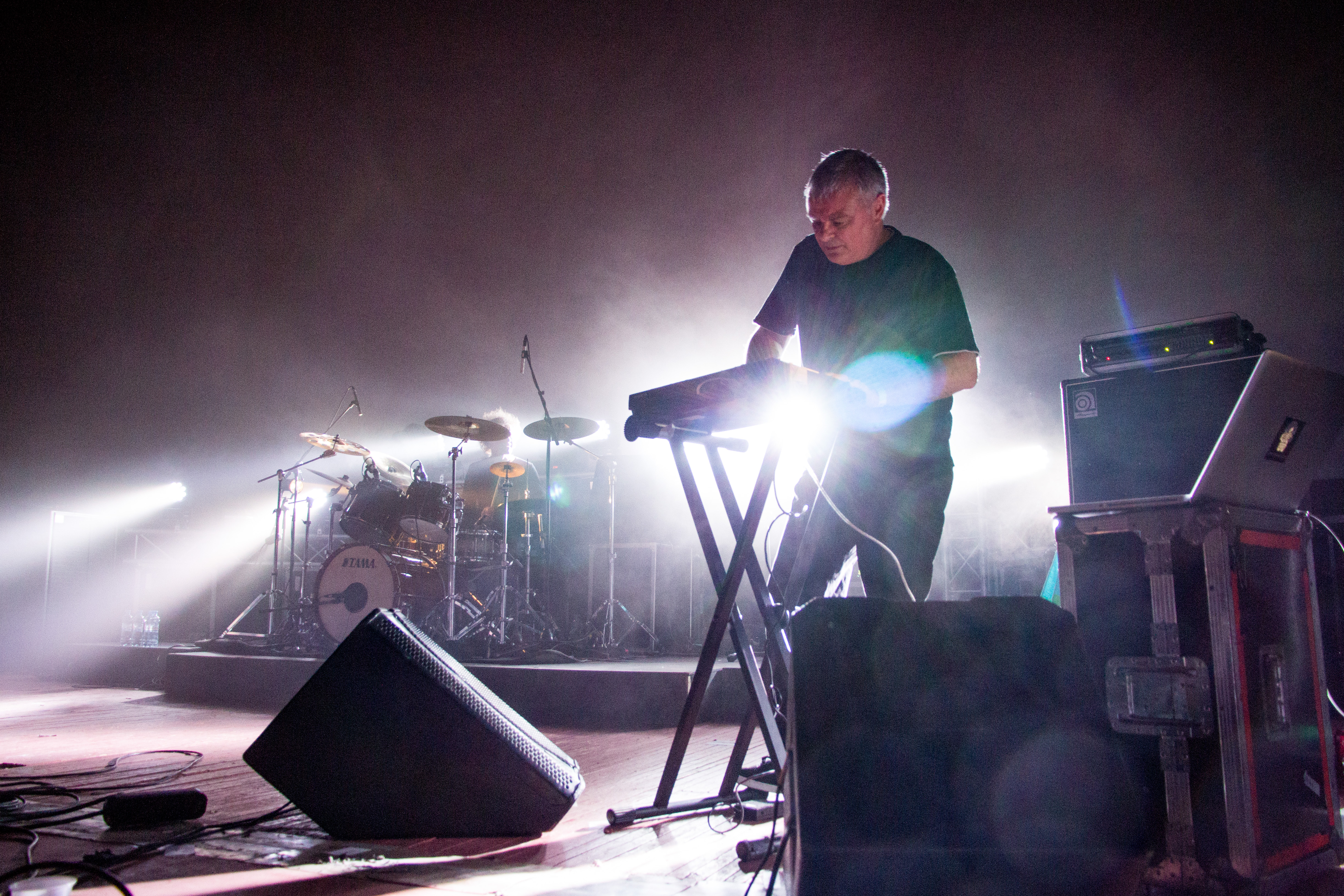
Trontin and Pizzi performing in 2014

Following the tour for Everybody Knows, Monod and Hänni departed the band in 2012. Treichler approached the band's former sampler player, Cesare Pizzi, who rejoined the band. The band toured in that year, performing tracks from the first two studio albums, The Young Gods and L'eau rouge, on which Pizzi had performed. The band also supplied original music for the animated short film, Kali the Little Vampire, which was released in that year.

In 2015, the band began working on new material. The album was inspired by their residency at Cully's Off Festival. The band performed to small crowds and regularly improvised; Treichler has started playing guitar. The resulting record, Data Mirage Tangram, was released in 2019. Mixed by Alan Moulder, the album was nominated for IMPALA's European Independent Album of the Year Award (2019). The band had approached Wax Trax! Records, which released their early work, for the record's North American release, which was turned down by the label. On 17 July 2020, the band released the accompanying live album, Data Mirage Tangram: Live at La Maroquinerie, Paris 2019 on Two Gentlemen.

In 2021, Treichler stated that the band has been working on a rendition of Terry Riley's In C, which the band has been performing live. In June 2022, the band announced their new record, Play Terry Riley In C, to be released on October 21, 2022.

== Musical style and legacy ==
The Young Gods - Envoyé
A 13 second sample from the 1987 single "Envoyé". The track was described as a "two-minute-long explosion of percussion, gunshots, a roughly abbreviated hair metal riff".

The Young Gods's sound has been described as industrial rock, industrial, avant-rock, post-industrial music and "sampledelic rock"; Treichler favours the term "electronic rock music". Since their early career, the band have used sampling as a compositional and performance tool, constructing tracks electronically with treated electric guitar samples, musique concrète, classical vignettes and electronica. Trouser Press remarked that The Young Gods's "unusual vocals/sampler/drums configuration reconstructs rock from the ground up, producing a fiery collage of roaring guitars, blistering rhythms and Wagnerian orchestras, all presided over by Franz Treichler's leering, guttural voice". Treichler has regarded "abstraction" and "element of surprise" as important factors for using the sampler, since they rendered the listeners to "the first time you're listening to music because you don't know what it is". As key influence on the band he has cited 60s psychedelia, Einstürzende Neubauten, Kraftwerk, punk rock movement and post-punk acts such as Killing Joke and Wire. Kurt Weill, whose compositions were covered on 1991's The Young Gods Play Kurt Weill, is also an influence: Treichler has credited him as a model for the band's "experiments with music but still in a song format".

The band has infused various styles of music to their sound through sampling: 1987's The Young Gods made use of classical and metal guitar samples: the band have described their sound on this record as "new sonic architecture". Their second album, L'eau rouge, incorporated cabaret and chanson influences. 1995's Only Heaven delved into ambient territories while "being cherished equally by heavy metal, indie, techno and industrial"; the ambient elements were explored on instrumental albums such as Heaven Deconstruction. Focusing on synthesized, found sounds and computer plug-ins on 2000's Second Nature, The Young Gods also occasionally strayed away from their sampler-based formula: multi-instrumentalist Vincent Hänni was employed for the recording of Everybody Knows and the acoustic record Knock on Wood. Treichler also played the guitar on those albums and Data Mirage Tangram.

Treichler's lyrics are mostly sung in French and English. The Young Gods and L'eau rouge largely featured French vocals while 1992's T.V. Sky became the band's first English-language record. On the subsequent records Treichler mixed the two languages; in 2005, he stated: "I hope to find a solution in between. But they're very different to sing; they both have their rules." Lyricwise, Treichler often uses double entendres: the track "L'Amourir" from L'eau rouge can be interpreted as "an intense love song or the end of a love affair". The title track from L'eau rouge is regarded as "a celebration of 'red water'" and is a reference to menstruation. The track "Lucidogen" from Second Nature illustrates "a fictitious drug which would make people more clairvoyant" and was inspired by an anti-World Trade Organization riot that Treichler witnessed in Geneva in 1998. On The Sex Revolts: Gender, Rebellion and Rock 'n' Roll, authors Simon Reynolds and Joy Press argued: "Treichler's lyrics brought out all the militaristic, fascistic tendencies inherent in Romanticism, Nietzsche et al., only to transcend and transfigure them"; in a 1995 interview, Treichler dismissed Reynolds's and Press's Nietzschean interpretation of his lyrics.

I thought they had some extraordinary ideas, by taking one chunk guitar riff and then sampling it, looping it, and having that as the consistent pattern through a piece of music. That became very much something that I thought, yes, I like that a lot, I'll try to employ that. They're quite something; I'd be very interested to see where they go.

— David Bowie on The Young Gods, in 1995

David Bowie has cited the band as an influence when he was asked in 1995 if his record Outside was influenced by Nine Inch Nails, stating: "The band that I was actually quite taken with was three guys from Switzerland called the Young Gods... I'd been aware of them previous to knowing about Nine Inch Nails." Bowie further praised the band's approach in sampling and looping guitar riffs, which he tried to employ in his record. U2 guitarist The Edge namedropped the band as an influence on his soundtrack work for 1990 musical adaptation of A Clockwork Orange and 1991's Achtung Baby. Devin Townsend reported Only Heaven and Second Nature to be among his favourite albums. Other artists influenced by The Young Gods include Disco Inferno guitarist Ian Crause, Sepultura, Napalm Death, Mike Patton, Ministry, Nine Inch Nails, The Chemical Brothers, Kill the Thrill and Laika.

== Members ==
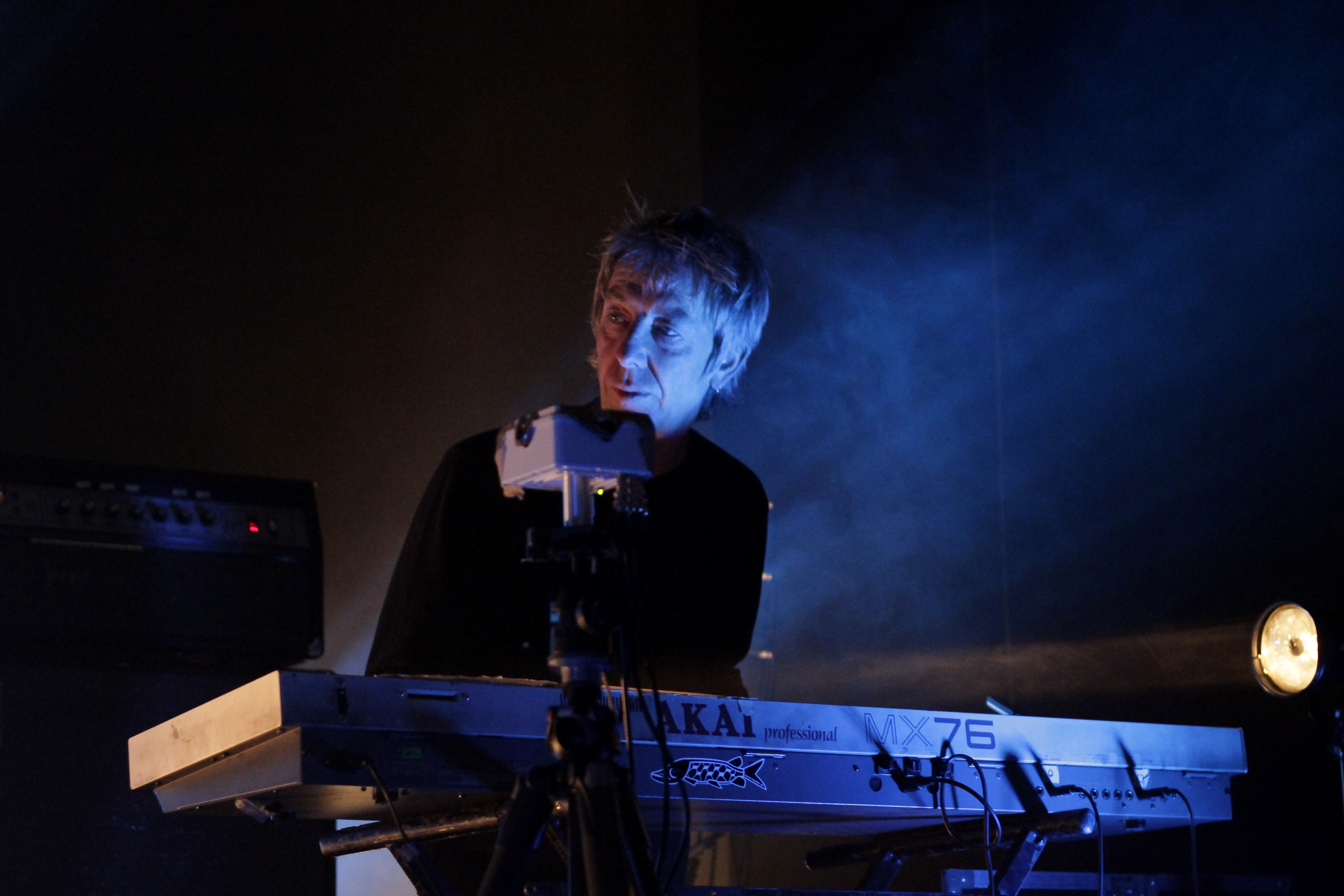
Monod with The Young Gods in 2011

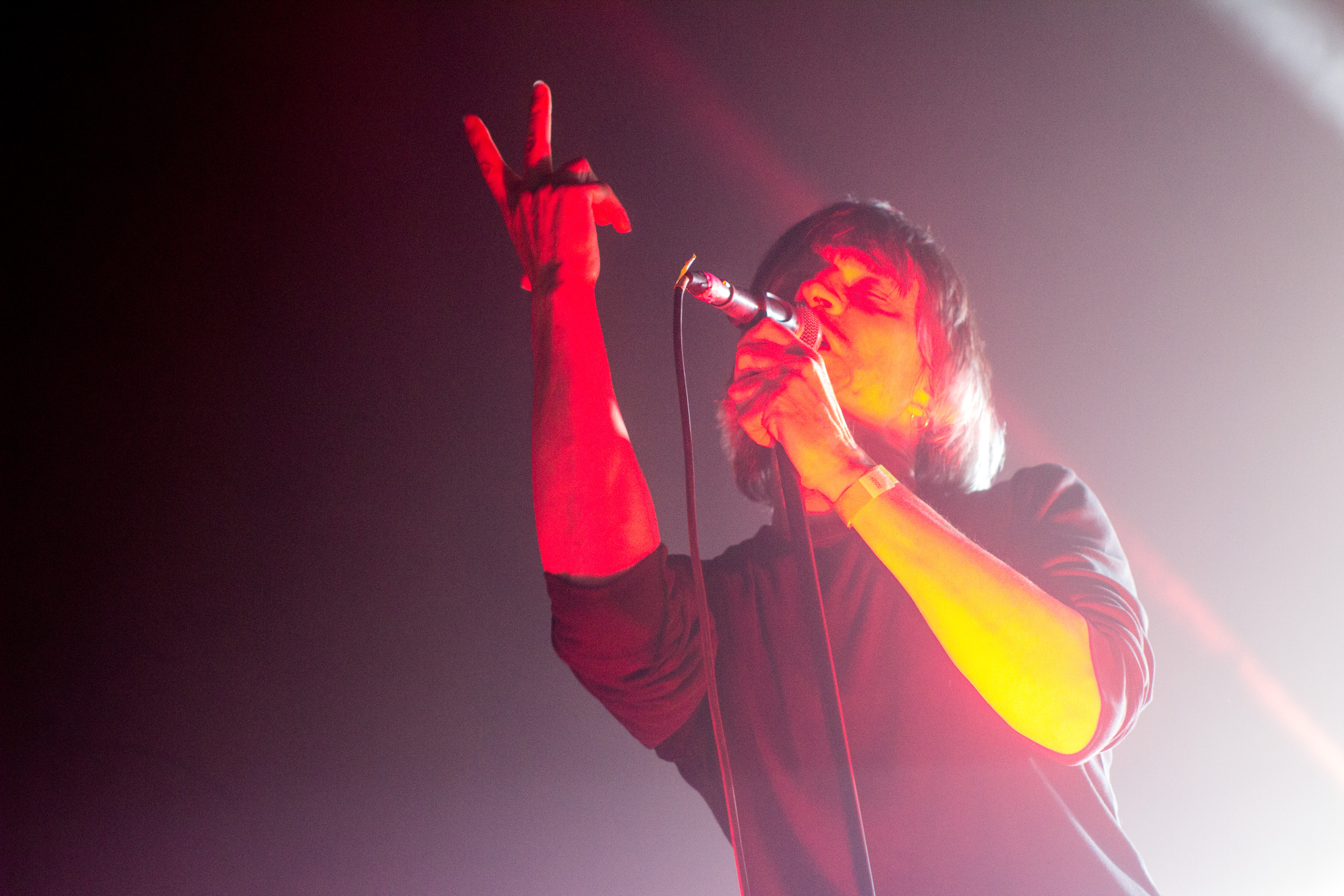
Treichler in 2014

Band members as adapted from the official website:

Current

- Franz Treichler (aka Franz Muse) – vocals, sampler, computer, guitar (1985–present)
- Cesare Pizzi (aka Ludan Dross) – sampler, computer (1985–1989, 2012–present)
- Bernard Trontin – drums, electronics (1997–present)

Past

- Frank Bagnoud (born Patrice Bagnoud) – drums (1985–1987) (died 2005)
- Urs "Üse" Hiestand – drums (1987–1996)
- Alain Monod (aka Al Comet) – sampler, keyboards, guitar (1989–2012)
- Vincent Hänni – guitar, bass guitar, electronics (2006–2011)

== Discography ==
=== Studio albums ===
- The Young Gods (1987)
- L'eau rouge (1989)
- T.V. Sky (1992)
- Only Heaven (1995)
- Second Nature (2000)
- Super Ready/Fragmenté (2007)
- Everybody Knows (2010)
- Data Mirage Tangram (2019)
- Appear Disappear (2025)

=== Instrumental and cover albums ===
- The Young Gods Play Kurt Weill (1991)
- Heaven Deconstruction (1997)
- Music for Artificial Clouds (2004)
- Play Terry Riley In C (2022)
