= Roli Mosimann =

Swiss-born drummer (1955–2024)

- Also known as: Roli Rox
- Born: 7 November 1955; Thurgau, Switzerland
- Died: 15 September 2024 (aged 68); Wrocław, Poland
- Occupations: Musician; record producer
- Instrument: Drums
- Years active: 1983–2024
- Formerly of: Swans; Wiseblood

Roli Mosimann (7 November 1955 – 15 September 2024) was a Swiss-born American drummer, electronic musician, and record producer who worked in genres ranging from industrial to pop. Originally from Switzerland, Mosimann first came to attention with the New York City no wave band Swans and later collaborated with Foetus leader JG Thirlwell in the duo Wiseblood.

Mosimann was born in Thurgau, Switzerland on 7 November 1955. As a producer, Mosimann worked with That Petrol Emotion, the Young Gods, the The, Celtic Frost, New Order and the Hair and Skin Trading Company, and helped birth Faith No More's Album of the Year, among others. He was an early producer for Skinny Puppy's The Process (1996) and Marilyn Manson's Portrait of an American Family (1994); however, both bands were unsatisfied with the results and chose to finish those albums with other producers (Martin Atkins and Trent Reznor, respectively).

Mosimann later worked with Jojo Mayer and Miloopa (engineering and mixing the latter band's Unicode album).

Mosimann died from lung cancer at a hospital in Wrocław, on 15 September 2024, at the age of 68.

== Sources ==
- Ozuna, Tony (26 March 2009). "This isn't jazz, it's Nerve". The Prague Post.
- Ankeny, Jason. "Skinny Puppy". MTV. Archived from the original on 17 December 2005.
- "That Petrol Emotion: Raw, rebellious rock". The Tuscaloosa News. 11 October 1987. p. 33.
