= Spear of Destiny discography =

- Studio albums: 14
- Live albums: 12
- Compilation albums: 15
- Singles: 16
- Video albums: 9
- Box sets: 3

This is the discography of British rock band Spear of Destiny.

== Albums ==
=== Studio albums ===
Title	Album details	Peak chart positions
Title	Album details	UK
Grapes of Wrath	Released: 15 April 1983; Label: Epic/Burning Rome; Formats: LP, MC	62
One Eyed Jacks	Released: April 1984; Label: Epic/Burning Rome; Formats: LP, MC	22
World Service	Released: August 1985; Label: Epic/Burning Rome; Formats: LP, MC	11
Outland	Released: April 1987; Label: 10; Formats: CD, LP, MC	16
The Price You Pay	Released: 10 October 1988; Label: Virgin; Formats: CD, LP, MC	37
Sod's Law	Released: 12 October 1992; Label: Burning Rome; Formats: CD, LP, MC	—
Religion	Released: 3 November 1997; Label: Eastworld Recordings; Formats: CD	—
Volunteers	Released: May 2000; Label: Do-Little; Formats: CD	—
Morning Star	Released: 13 January 2003; Label: Eastersnow; Formats: CD	—
Loadestone	Released: 2005; Label: Eastersnow; Formats: CD	—
Imperial Prototype	Released: 5 November 2007; Label: Eastersnow; Formats: CD	—
Omega Point	Released: 8 November 2010; Label: Eastersnow; Formats: CD, LP, digital download	—
31	Released: 15 September 2014; Label: Eastersnow; Formats: CD, LP, digital download	—
Tontine	Released: 6 April 2018; Label: Eastersnow; Formats: CD, LP, digital download	—
Ghost Population	Released: 14 November 2022; Label: Eastersnow; Formats: CD, LP, digital download	—
"—" denotes releases that did not chart or were not released in that territory.

=== Live albums ===
Title	Album details
Live at the Lyceum 22.12.85	Released: 1993; Label: Mau Mau; Formats: CD
BBC Radio One Live in Concert	Released: March 1994; Label: Windsong International; Formats: CD
Live '83 – The Preacher	Released: May 2000; Label: Receiver; Formats: CD
Kings of London – Live	Released: 2001; Label: Self-released; Formats: CD
Live at Colchester	Released: 2002; Label: Self-released; Formats: CD
Live at the Forum – London '88	Released: 29 May 2006; Label: Easterstone; Formats: CD; Originally released on Psalm 1
Live at the National – London '87	Released: 12 June 2006; Label: Easterstone; Formats: CD; Originally released on Psalm 2
Live at Barrowlands – Glasgow '85	Released: 17 July 2006; Label: Easterstone; Formats: CD; Originally released on Psalm 3
Live at the Ace – Brixton 1983	Released: 18 September 2006; Label: Eastworld Recordings; Formats: CD; Originally released on Psalm 5
Grapes of Wrath – Live	Released: 2008; Label: Self-released; Formats: CD
One Eyed Jacks – Live	Released: 2009; Label: Self-released; Formats: CD
King of Kings	Released: 6 October 2017; Label: Secret; Formats: 2xCD+DVD
Best of live 1988	Released: 3 February 2023; Label: Secret; Formats: LP

=== Compilation albums ===
Title	Album details	Peak chart positions
Title	Album details	UK
S.O.D. The Epic Years	Released: 5 May 1987; Label: Epic/Burning Rome; Formats: CD, LP, MC	53
The Collection	Released: November 1991; Label: Castle Communications; Formats: CD	—
Time of Our Lives – The Best of Spear of Destiny	Released: February 1995; Label: 10; Formats: CD	—
Psalm 1	Released: 12 January 1998; Label: Eastworld Recordings; Formats: 2xCD	—
Psalm 2	Released: February 1998; Label: Eastworld Recordings; Formats: 2xCD	—
Psalm 3	Released: 2 March 1998; Label: Eastworld Recordings; Formats: 2xCD	—
Psalm 4	Released: 6 April 1998; Label: Eastworld Recordings; Formats: 2xCD	—
Psalm 5	Released: 4 May 1998; Label: Eastworld Recordings; Formats: 2xCD	—
The Best of Spear of Destiny	Released: October 1998; Label: Recall 2cd; Formats: 2xCD; Not the original recordings	—
The Best of Spear of Destiny	Released: February 2004; Label: Sony Music; Formats: CD	—
The Best of Spear of Destiny	Released: January 2005; Label: EMI Gold; Formats: CD	—
Sods and Odds	Released: 18 September 2006; Label: Easterstone; Formats: CD	—
The Singles Collection	Released: September 2008; Label: Eastersnow; Formats: CD	—
The Singles 1983–88	Released: 16 July 2012; Label: Anagram; Formats: 2xCD	—
Thirty Years and Counting	Released: 1 October 2013; Label: Easterstone; Formats: 3xCD, digital download	—
"—" denotes releases that did not chart.

=== Box sets ===
Title	Album details
In Concert – Do You Believe in the Westworld?	Released: 25 October 2004; Label: Shakedown; Formats: 2xCD+DVD
The Albums 1983–85	Released: 26 April 2019; Label: Cherry Red; Formats: 3xCD
The Virgin Years	Released: 28 August 2019; Label: Self-released; Formats: 4xCD box set

=== Video albums ===
Title	Album details
The Outland Videos	Released: 1987; Label: Virgin Music Video; Formats: VHS
Live – The Hacienda Manchester England 1983	Released: 30 August 2004; Label: Cherry Red; Formats: DVD
Best of Westworld Weekend III 2004	Released: 2004; Label: Self-released; Formats: DVD
In Performance at Her Majesty's Request	Released: 30 May 2005; Label: Secret Films; Formats: DVD
Re-Animation Tour	Released: 2006; Label: Self-released; Formats: DVD
Grapes of Wrath – Live	Released: 2008; Label: Self-released; Formats: DVD
The Singles Tour Live	Released: 2009; Label: Self-released; Formats: DVD
Westworld Weekend IX – 2010	Released: 2010; Label: Self-released; Formats: DVD
Second Life Tour – Live 2018	Released: 2019; Label: Self-released; Formats: DVD

=== Other albums ===
Title	Album details
One Eyed Jacks @ 35	Released: 3 September 2019; Label: Eastersnow; Formats: CD, LP, digital download; Re-recording of second album
World Service @ 35	Released: 26 October 2020; Label: Eastersnow; Formats: CD, LP, digital download; Re-recording of debut album

== Singles ==
Title	Year	Peak chart positions		Album
Title	Year	UK	IRE	Album
"Flying Scotsman"	1983	85	—	Grapes of Wrath
"The Wheel"	1983	59	—	Grapes of Wrath
"Prisoner of Love"	1984	59	—	One Eyed Jacks
"Liberator"	1984	67	—	One Eyed Jacks
"All My Love (Ask Nothing)"	1985	61	—	World Service
"Come Back"	1985	55	—	World Service
"Mickey" (Netherlands-only release)	1985	—	—	World Service
"Strangers in Our Town"	1987	49	—	Outland
"Never Take Me Alive"	1987	14	18	Outland
"Was That You?"	1987	55	—	Outland
"The Traveller"	1987	44	—	Outland
"So in Love with You"	1988	36	—	The Price You Pay
"Radio Radio"	1988	78	—	The Price You Pay
"Black Country Girl"	1992	—	—	Sod's Law
"Uphill Backwards"	1999	—	—	Volunteers
"Fascinations"	2015	—	—	31
"—" denotes releases that did not chart or were not released in that territory.
