= Paradise Lost discography =

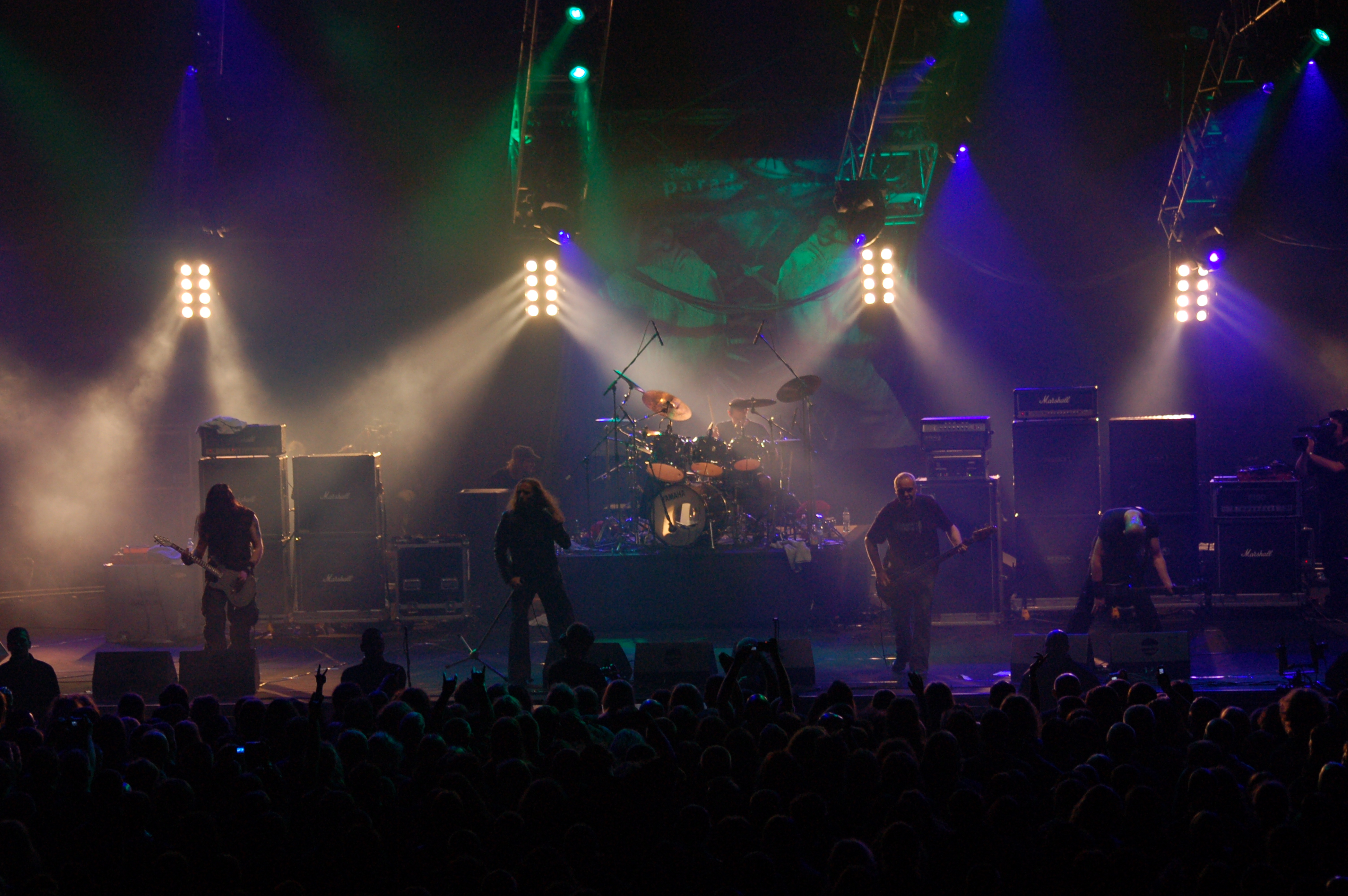
- Paradise Lost performing at Metalmania Festival in 2007
- Studio albums: 17
- Extended plays: 2
- Live albums: 6
- Compilation albums: 5
- Singles: 21
- Video albums: 7
- Music videos: 24

This article lists the comprehensive discography of British gothic metal band Paradise Lost.

== Albums ==
=== Studio albums ===
Title	Album details	Peak chart positions										Sales
Title	Album details	UK	AUT	FIN	FRA	GER	NLD	NOR	SPA	SWE	SWI	Sales
Lost Paradise	Released: 5 February 1990; Label: Peaceville; Formats: CD, CS, LP, DL	—	—	—	—	—	—	—	—	—	—	
Gothic	Released: 19 March 1991; Label: Peaceville; Formats: CD, CS, LP, DL	—	—	—	—	—	—	—	—	—	—	
Shades of God	Released: 14 July 1992; Label: Music for Nations; Formats: CD, CS, LP, DL	—	—	—	—	—	79	—	—	—	—	
Icon	Released: 28 September 1993; Label: Music for Nations; Formats: CD, CS, LP, DL	—	—	—	—	31	80	—	—	—	—	UK: 33,000+; GER: 120,000+; WW: 300,000+
Draconian Times	Released: 12 June 1995; Label: Music for Nations; Formats: CD, CD+DVD, CS, LP, DL	16	21	24	—	15	46	—	—	16	20	US: 19,316+; WW: 500,000+
One Second	Released: 14 July 1997; Label: Music for Nations; Formats: CD, CS, LP, DL	31	10	7	21	8	39	25	—	5	40	
Host	Released: 28 April 1999; Label: EMI; Formats: CD, CS	61	33	7	67	4	—	38	—	19	—	
Believe in Nothing	Released: 29 January 2001; Label: EMI; Formats: CD, CS	144	31	18	48	10	—	—	—	43	41	
Symbol of Life	Released: 21 October 2002; Label: GUN; Formats: CD, CS, DL	166	—	—	61	16	—	—	—	56	77	
Paradise Lost	Released: 17 March 2005; Label: GUN; Formats: CD, CS, DL	—	34	36	63	18	—	—	—	21	59	
In Requiem	Released: 21 May 2007; Label: Century Media; Formats: CD, LP, DL	125	28	19	43	12	—	—	—	33	41	
Faith Divides Us – Death Unites Us	Released: 25 September 2009; Label: Century Media; Formats: CD, LP, DL	122	54	22	45	22	84	—	70	29	52	
Tragic Idol	Released: 18 April 2012; Label: Century Media; Formats: CD, LP, DL	73	15	15	67	6	85	25	90	24	23	
The Plague Within	Released: 1 June 2015; Label: Century Media; Formats: CD, LP, DL	51	14	4	53	7	28	—	50	49	21	
Medusa	Released: 1 September 2017; Label: Nuclear Blast; Formats: CD, LP, DL	56	15	7	85	6	70	—	30	38	14	
Obsidian	Released: 15 May 2020; Label: Nuclear Blast; Formats: CD, LP, DL	32	5	2	105	2	31	—	—	—	4	
Ascension	Released: 19 September 2025; Label: Nuclear Blast; Formats: CD, LP, DL	54	5	7	58	6	29	—	—	—	11	
"—" denotes a recording that did not chart or was not released in that territory.

=== Live albums ===
Title	Album details	Peak chart positions	
Title	Album details	FRA	GER
At the BBC	Released: 14 April 2003; Label: Strange Fruit; Formats: CD	—	—
The Anatomy of Melancholy	Released: 23 May 2008; Label: Century Media; Formats: CD, CD+DVD, LP, DL	175	42
Draconian Times MMXI	Released: 4 November 2011; Label: Century Media; Formats: CD, CD+DVD, LP, DL	—	—
Live at the Roundhouse	Released: 9 December 2013; Label: Abbey Road Studios; Formats: LP	—	—
Symphony for the Lost	Released: 20 November 2015; Label: Century Media; Formats: 2×CD+DVD, DL	192	69
Live at Rockpalast 1995	Released: 29 November 2019; Label: MIG-Music GmbH; Formats: CD+DVD	—	—
At the Mill	Released: 16 July 2021; Label: Nuclear Blast; Formats: CD+DVD	—	11
"—" denotes a recording that did not chart or was not released in that territory.

=== Compilation albums ===
Title	Album details	Peak chart positions	
Title	Album details	UK	BEL (WA)
The Singles Collection	Released: 3 November 1997; Label: Music for Nations; Formats: CD	—	—
Reflection	Released: 6 October 1998; Label: Music for Nations; Formats: CD, CS, DL	191	—
Drown in Darkness – The Early Demos	Released: 25 May 2009; Label: Century Media; Formats: CD, LP, DL	—	—
Lost in Time	Released: 7 June 2012; Label: Century Media; Formats: DL	—	—
Tragic Illusion 25 (The Rarities)	Released: 5 November 2013; Label: Century Media; Formats: CD, CD+LP, DL	—	120
"—" denotes a recording that did not chart or was not released in that territory.

== EPs ==
Title	Album details	Charts
Title	Album details	UK
As I Die	Released: 6 April 1993; Label: Music for Nations; Formats: CD, CS, LP	—
Seals the Sense	Released: 21 February 1994; Label: Music for Nations; Formats: CD & 12"	92
Gothic EP	Released: 18 July 1994; Label: Peaceville; Formats: CD	—

== Demos ==
Title	Demo details
Morbid Existence	Released: 1988; Label: Self-released; Formats: CS
Paradise Lost	Released: 3 December 1988; Label: Self-released; Formats: CS
Plains of Desolation	Released: 1989; Label: Self-released; Formats: CS
Frozen Illusion	Released: August 1989; Label: Self-released; Formats: CS

== Singles ==
Title	Year	Peak chart positions				Album
Title	Year	UK	FIN	GER	SWE	Album
"Frozen Illusion"	1989	—	—	—	—	Lost Paradise
"In Dub (Rotting Misery / Breeding Fear)"	1990	—	—	—	—	Lost Paradise
"As I Die"	1992	177	11	—	—	Shades of God
"The Last Time"	1995	60	—	60	—	Draconian Times
"Enchantment"	1995	—	—	—	—	Draconian Times
"Forever Failure"	1995	66	—	—	—	Draconian Times
"True Belief '97"	1997	—	—	—	—	Icon
"Soul Courageous"	1997	—	—	—	—	One Second
"Say Just Words"	1997	53	8	—	44	One Second
"One Second"	1998	94	—	—	—	One Second
"So Much Is Lost"	1999	—	—	—	—	Host
"Permanent Solution"	1999	—	—	—	—	Host
"Sell it to the World"	2001	—	—	—	—	Believe in Nothing
"Mouth"	2001	—	—	89	—	Believe in Nothing
"Fader"	2001	—	—	—	—	Believe in Nothing
"Isolate"	2002	—	—	—	—	Symbol of Life
"Erased"	2002	—	—	80	—	Symbol of Life
"Small Town Boy"	2003	—	—	—	—	Symbol of Life
"Forever After"	2005	—	—	77	—	Paradise Lost
"The Enemy"	2007	—	—	84	—	In Requiem
"Crucify"	2012	—	—	—	—	Tragic Idol
"—" denotes a recording that did not chart or was not released in that territory.

== Videos ==
=== Video albums ===
Title	Video details	Peak chart positions
Title	Video details	SWE
Live Death	Released: 4 November 1990; Label: Jettisoundz Video; Formats: VHS, DVD	—
Harmony Breaks	Released: 9 June 1994; Label: Music for Nations; Formats: VHS	—
One Second Live	Released: 1999; Label: Music for Nations; Formats: VHS	—
Evolve	Released: 12 June 2002; Label: Music for Nations; Formats: DVD	18
Over the Madness	Released: 26 November 2007; Label: Century Media; Formats: DVD	—
The Anatomy of Melancholy	Released: 23 May 2008; Label: Century Media; Formats: DVD	5
Draconian Times MMXI	Released: 7 November 2011; Label: Century Media; Formats: DVD	—
"—" denotes a recording that did not chart or was not released in that territory.

=== Music videos ===
Year	Title	Director	Album
1992	"Pity the Sadness"	—	Shades of God
1992	"As I Die"	James Engwell	Shades of God
1993	"Widow"	—	Icon
1993	"True Belief"	—	Icon
1993	"Embers Fire"	David Barnard	Icon
1995	"The Last Time"	Jan Russell	Draconian Times
1995	"Forever Failure"	—	Draconian Times
1997	"Say Just Words"	—	One Second
1997	"One Second"	—	One Second
1999	"So Much Is Lost"	Marcus Nispel	Host
1999	"Permanent Solution"	—	Host
2001	"Mouth"	Thomas Job	Believe in Nothing
2001	"Fader"	—	Believe in Nothing
2002	"Erased"	Stefan Klotz	Symbol of Life
2005	"Forever After"	Volker Hannwacker	Paradise Lost
2007	"The Enemy"	Edward 209	In Requiem
2007	"Praise Lamented Shade"	Dash Productions	In Requiem
2009	"Faith Divides Us – Death Unites Us"	Nathan T Heys	Faith Divides Us - Death Unites Us
2009	"The Rise of Denial"	Nigel Crane	Faith Divides Us - Death Unites Us
2012	"Honesty in Death"	Matt Green	Tragic Idol
2012	"Fear of Impending Hell"	Steve Edmondson	Tragic Idol
2015	"Beneath Broken Earth"	Ash Pears	The Plague Within
2016	"Terminal"	—	The Plague Within
2016	"Victim of the Past" (live video)	—	Symphony for the Lost
2017	"Blood and Chaos"	Ash Pears	Medusa
2020	"Fall from Grace"	—	Obsidian
2020	"Darker Thoughts"	Ash Pears	Obsidian
2025	"Silence Like the Grave"	Ash Pears	Ascension
2025	"Serpent on the Cross"	Lars Kristoffer Hormander	Ascension
2025	"Tyrants Serenade"	Ash Pears	Ascension
2025	"Salvation"	Ash Pears	Ascension
