= Kirk Brandon's 10:51 =

Kirk Brandon's 10:51 is the band formed during a visit by Kirk Brandon to Stan Stammers in Philadelphia, Pennsylvania, whilst Spear of Destiny was on hiatus. Stone in the Rain is the band's only album to date, released by Anagram Records in 1995. The album was released by Dojo Records in the United States as Retribution under the Theatre of Hate banner.

== Discography ==
=== Studio albums ===
Stone in the Rain

Studio album by Kirk Brandon's 10:51
- Released: 1995
- Recorded: Mix-O. Lydian Studio, Boonton, N.J. July/August, 1994
- Genre: Rock
- Length: 54:23
- Label: Anagram Records
- Producer: Brad Morrison

- Stone in the Rain
- Retribution

== Personnel ==
- Kirk Brandon - vocals, guitar
- Stan Stammers - bass guitar
- John McNutt - guitar
- Art Smith - drums
- Derek Forbes - bass guitar on "I Can See"

== See also ==
- Dead Men Walking
