= Tragic Idol =

Studio album by Paradise Lost
- Released: 18 April 2012
- Recorded: 16 November 2011 – ?
- Studios: The Chapel Studios, Lincolnshire; Fascination Street Studios, Örebro
- Genres: Gothic metal; doom metal
- Length: 46:05
- Label: Century Media
- Producer: Jens Bogren

Paradise Lost chronology
Faith Divides Us – Death Unites Us (2009)	Tragic Idol (2012)	Tragic Illusion 25 (The Rarities) (2013)

Professional ratings
Review scores
Source	Rating
About.com	4.5/5 stars
Exclaim!	(favorable)
Jukebox:Metal	3.5/5 stars
Metal Forces	(8/10)
Sputnikmusic	3.5/5 stars

Tragic Idol is the thirteenth studio album by British gothic metal band Paradise Lost, released on 23 April 2012 in Europe and 24 April 2012 in North America through Century Media Records.

In support of the album, Paradise Lost went on a UK concert tour with Insomnium.

Formats the album was released through are: Standard CD; Limited Edition 2-CD Box; a fan box, which includes a poster, album slipmat, gold marbled colored 7" & 12" Vinyl, A1 poster 135g, army cap and boxes selected at random will include handwritten lyrics by the band. This band has a box set titled Original Album Classics and they have a similar release titled Original Album Collection which has this album along with this band's other albums, In Requiem and Faith Divides Us - Death Unites Us. There are EMP Edition (200 copies) - gold vinyl, Amazon Edition (400 copies Germany / 200 copies France) - white vinyl, Nuclear Blast Edition (400 copies) - dark blue vinyl and Band Edition (250 copies, signed) - dark sand marbled vinyl

Guitarist Gregor Mackintosh commented: "The [new CD was] again produced by Jens Bogren and is influenced by classic doom metal and classic metal. I would say it is more melodic than the last record whilst retaining the heaviness. There are lots of guitar solos and melodies."

Also this is the first Paradise Lost studio album featuring Adrian Erlandsson on drums, who joined the band in 2009.

There is a track called "The Last Fallen Saviour" which was written for this album but it was initially made only available as a free flexi disc with Decibel magazine, but has since been included on Tragic Illusion 25, a rarities compilation released in 2013 to commemorate the band's 25th anniversary.

== Track listing ==
No.	Title	Length
1.	"Solitary One"	4:08
2.	"Crucify"	4:08
3.	"Fear of Impending Hell"	5:25
4.	"Honesty in Death"	4:08
5.	"Theories from Another World"	5:02
6.	"In This We Dwell"	3:55
7.	"To the Darkness"	5:09
8.	"Tragic Idol"	4:35
9.	"Worth Fighting For"	4:12
10.	"The Glorious End"	5:23
Total length:		46:05

Limited edition bonus CD

No.	Title	Album	Length
11.	"Ending Through Changes"		4:09
12.	"Never Take Me Alive" (Spear of Destiny cover)	Outland	4:48
Total length:			55:02

Limited edition Japanese edition CD

No.	Title	Album	Length
13.	"True Belief (Live)"	Icon	4:52
14.	"One Second (Live)"	One Second	3:38
15.	"Say Just Words (Live)"	One Second	4:51
Total length:			68:23

== Credits ==
=== Paradise Lost ===
- Nick Holmes – vocals and lyrics
- Gregor Mackintosh – lead guitar and music
- Aaron Aedy – rhythm guitar
- Steve Edmondson – bass
- Adrian Erlandsson – drums

=== Production ===
- Jens Bogren – production, mixing
- Johan Örnborg – engineering

=== Imagery ===
- Valnoir & Metastazis.com – album artwork
- Paul Harries – photography
- Paul Grand – background photography
- Takehiko Maeda (前田岳彦) – liner notes

== Charts ==
Chart (2012)	Peak position
Austrian Albums (Ö3 Austria)	15
Belgian Albums (Ultratop Flanders)	62
Belgian Albums (Ultratop Wallonia)	42
Danish Albums (Hitlisten)	40
Dutch Albums (Album Top 100)	85
Finnish Albums (Suomen virallinen lista)	15
French Albums (SNEP)	67
German Albums (Offizielle Top 100)	6
Japanese Albums (Oricon)	243
Hungarian Albums (MAHASZ)	28
Norwegian Albums (VG-lista)	25
Scottish Albums (Official Charts)	85
Spanish Albums (Promusicae)	90
Swedish Albums (Sverigetopplistan)	24
Swiss Albums (Schweizer Hitparade)	23
UK Albums (Official Charts)	73
