= Jim Walker (drummer) =

Canadian musician (born 1955)

- Born: 1955 (age 70–71); Edmonton, Alberta, Canada
- Genres: Punk rock, post-punk
- Occupation: Drummer
- Years active: 1977–1984
- Formerly of: Public Image Ltd.

Jim Walker (born 1955) is a Canadian musician who was a founding director as well as the original drummer for the UK music group Public Image Ltd.

== Early life and education ==
James Donat Walker was born in Edmonton, Alberta. He first trained as a jazz drummer at the Berklee College of Music in Boston, where he was taught by Alan Dawson and Joe Hunt.

== Career ==
In 1977, Walker, along with Malcolm Hasman and Chris Arnett, formed the Vancouver area punk band the Furies, the first punk rock band in Western Canada. The band broke up after a few months, and Walker moved to London later that year. In early May 1978, after answering an ad placed in Melody Maker, he auditioned for and became a founding member of Public Image Ltd., with John Lydon, Keith Levene, and John Wardle (Jah Wobble).

Dissatisfied with the band's direction, he left PiL as a player in February 1979, and as a director in January 1980. After PiL, he played for a few lesser known local London bands, including Kirk Brandon of Theatre of Hate's first band, The Pack, and Stan Stammers' band The Straps, before forming the Human Condition in 1981 with Jah Wobble and Dave "Animal" Maltby. The Human Condition were together for just over a year, playing to mixed reviews, before disbanding in 1982.

In 1984, he left London for New York, and after playing that year left the music industry. Walker was interviewed for the 2017 documentary film, The Public Image is Rotten.
