= Aria of the Devil =

Studio album by Theatre of Hate
- Released: 1998
- Recorded: 1982
- Studio: Wessex Studios, London
- Genre: Post-punk, new wave
- Length: 38:44
- Label: Original Masters/Snapper Music
- Producer: Mick Jones

Theatre of Hate chronology
Ten Years After (1993)	Aria of the Devil (1998)

Aria of the Devil is the second of two studio albums by Theatre of Hate issued after the band's dissolution in 1983. It was released in 1998 by Original Masters/Snapper Music

== Track listing ==
All songs written by Kirk Brandon.

1. "Ovature" – 3:14
2. "Aria of the Devil" – 4:18
3. "Dreams of the Poppy" – 4:03
4. "Omen of the Times" – 3:12
5. "The Incinerator" – 4:07
6. "Nero" – 5:10
7. "Americanos" – 3:51
8. "Eastworld" – 3:29
9. "The Black Madonna" – 3:24
10. "Solution" – 3:35

== Personnel ==
Theatre of Hate

- Kirk Brandon – vocals, guitar
- Stan Stammers – bass guitar
- Nigel Preston – drums

Technical

- Mick Jones – recording, production
