= World Service (disambiguation) =

BBC World Service is an international broadcaster.

World Service may also refer to:

- World Service, an early name of British band Simply Red
- World Service (Spear of Destiny album), a 1985 album by Spear of Destiny
- World Service (Delirious? album), a 2003 album by Delirious?

== See also ==
- World Service Authority
