= Grapes of Wrath (album) =

Studio album by Spear of Destiny
- Released: 15 April 1983
- Recorded: The Shuttle
- Genre: Rock, post-punk
- Length: 35:38
- Label: Epic, Burning Rome Records
- Producer: Nick Launay

Spear of Destiny chronology
Grapes of Wrath (1983)	One Eyed Jacks (1984)

Grapes of Wrath is the first studio album by Spear of Destiny, released by Epic Records in 1983. The band's first single was "Flying Scotsman" followed by the second single "The Wheel".

== Track listing ==
All songs written by Kirk Brandon

Side one

1. "The Wheel" - 3:10
2. "Flying Scotsman" - 3:20
3. "Roof of the World" - 3:02
4. "Aria" - 4:38
5. "Solution" - 3:56

Side two

1. "The Murder of Love" - 3:12
2. "The Preacher" - 2:34
3. "Omen of the Times" - 3:15
4. "The Man Who Tunes the Drums" - 2:47
5. "Grapes of Wrath" - 4:44

A 'Special Cassette Mix' version of the album was also released. It comprises (in track-listed order):

A1 "The Wheel"
A2 "Flying Scotsman" (12" Version)
A3 "Roof of the World"
A4 "Aria"
A5 "Solution" (preceded by a brief guitar version of The Third Man Theme bridging from A4)
B1 "The Preacher" (including a vocal-only intro of the entire song)
B2 "The Murder of Love" (sans finger-clicking intro)
B3 "Omen of the Times" (preceded by an air raid siren bridging from B2)
B4 "The Man Who Tunes the Drums"
B5 "Grapes of Wrath"

== Personnel ==
Spear of Destiny

- Kirk Brandon - vocals, guitar
- Stan Stammers - bass guitar
- Lascelles James - saxophone, flute
- Chris Bell - drums

with:

- The Sisters - backing vocals on "Flying Scotsman" and "Roof of the World"

Technical

- Nick Launay - engineer, mixing
- Gavin MacKillop - assistant engineer
- Pierre Boucher - front cover photography

"Thanks to The Sisters. Special Thanks to Trevor Ravenscroft".
