= Portas (surname) =

Portas is a surname. Notable people with the surname include:

- Adrian Portas, English musician, singer and songwriter
- Albert Portas (born 1973), Spanish former tennis player
- Mary Portas (born 1960), English retail consultant and broadcaster
- Maximiani Portas (1905–1982), pseudonym Savitri Devi, Greek-French writer and World War II Nazi spy in India
- Miguel Portas (1958–2012), Portuguese politician, brother of Paulo Portas
- Nuno Portas (1934–2025), Portuguese architect
- Paulo Portas (born 1962), Portuguese politician, former Deputy Prime Minister of Portugal
