= Imperial Prototype =

Studio album by Spear of Destiny
- Released: 5 November 2007
- Genre: Post-punk
- Length: 45:07
- Label: Eastersnow

Spear of Destiny chronology
Loadestone (2005)	Imperial Prototype (2007)	Omega Point (2010)

Imperial Prototype is the eleventh studio album by Spear of Destiny. The album was released on Brandon's own record label Eastersnow and all the songs were written just prior to recording. A blog on the official Spear of Destiny Myspace said the album would be available through SOD's own mailing list and live outlets before their new distributors Redeyeusa made it available worldwide but Despite the blog saying the album would be available on iTunes as a download it never was.

All the members of the band at the time of which the album was released were previously in other successful or semi-successful bands before joining Kirk Brandon. Craig Adams who plays bass was previously in The Sisters of Mercy and The Mission, Adrian Portas has been in New Model Army, Steve Alan Jones was in The Alarm and Robin Goodridge was in Bush. Brandon claims his favourite song from the album is "Death in the Mountains".

== Track listing ==
All tracks composed by Kirk Brandon; except where indicated

1. "Santa Clause" - 3:42
2. "Berlin Berlin" - 4:13
3. "Lock & Key" - 3:02
4. "‘79" - 4:29
5. "Donkey Ride" - 3:27
6. "Death in the Mountains" - 5:55
7. "Bizarre Personality" - 3:13
8. "Wake of a Ship" - 6:09
9. "Thoughts of an Imperial Prototype" - 3:09
10. "Tupelo Prince" (lyrics: Slim Jim Phantom) - 2:51
11. "Treachery" - 5:06

== Personnel ==
Spear of Destiny

- Kirk Brandon - vocals, guitar
- Robin Goodridge - drums
- Craig Adams - bass
- Adrian Portas - guitar
- Steve Allan Jones - keyboards
