= Westworld (Theatre of Hate album) =

Studio album by Theatre of Hate
- Released: February 1982
- Genre: Post-punk, gothic rock
- Length: 56:07
- Label: Burning Rome
- Producer: Mick Jones

Theatre of Hate chronology
Westworld (1982)	Ten Years After (1993)

Westworld is the first studio album by English post-punk band Theatre of Hate. It was released in February 1982 by record label Burning Rome, prior to the band's dissolution in 1983. It was produced by Mick Jones of the Clash.

== Track listing ==
All tracks are written by Kirk Brandon

Side A
No.	Title	Length
1.	"Do You Believe in the West World"	5:16
2.	"Judgement Hymn"	5:25
3.	"63"	2:51
4.	"Love Is a Ghost"	3:31
5.	"The Wake"	4:17

Side B
No.	Title	Length
1.	"Conquistador"	3:03
2.	"The New Trail of Tears"	2:50
3.	"Freaks"	3:48
4.	"Anniversary"	5:24
5.	"The Klan"	6:52

1997 reissue bonus tracks
No.	Title	Length
11.	"Nero"	5:11
12.	"Incinerator"	4:20
13.	"Propaganda"	3:07

== Release ==
Westworld reached No. 17 on the UK Albums Chart.

== Critical reception ==
Professional ratings
Review scores
Source	Rating
AllMusic	3.5/5 stars

Westworld was generally viewed by critics as a disappointment in comparison to the group's previous work. AllMusic wrote, "Unfortunately, [Westworld] [...] is not as consistently brilliant as the singles that preceded it". Robert Murray, in the book The Rough Guide to Rock, called it "a work [...] heavy on atmospherics, but which ultimately failed to capture the live potency upon which the band's reputation had been built".

== Personnel ==
Theatre of Hate

- Kirk Brandon – vocals, guitar
- Stan Stammers – bass guitar
- John "Boy" Lennard – saxophone, clarinet
- Luke Rendall – drums

Technical

- Mick Jones – production
- Jeremy Green – engineering
- Mark Freegard – assistant engineer
- Kev – cutting
- C·More·Tone Studios – album cover artwork
