= World Service (Spear of Destiny album) =

Studio album by Spear of Destiny
- Released: August 1985
- Studio: Trident 1; RAK Studios, London
- Genre: Rock
- Length: 43:17
- Label: Epic
- Producer: Rusty Egan, Spear of Destiny

Spear of Destiny chronology
One Eyed Jacks (1984)	World Service (1985)	Outland (1987)

Professional ratings
Review scores
Source	Rating
AllMusic	3.5/5 stars

World Service is the third studio album by Spear of Destiny, released by Epic Records in 1985.

== Track listing ==
All songs written by Kirk Brandon

Side one

1. "Rocket Ship" - 4:41
2. "Up All Night" - 3:11
3. "Come Back" - 3:36
4. "World Service" - 4:33
5. "I Can See" - 4:24

Side two

1. "All My Love (Ask Nothing)" - 3:44
2. "Mickey" - 6:20
3. "Somewhere in the East" - 3:24
4. "Once in Her Lifetime" - 5:31
5. "Harlan County" - 3:53

== Personnel ==
Spear of Destiny

- Kirk Brandon - vocals, guitar
- Stan Stammers - bass guitar
- Dolphin Taylor - drums, percussion
- Neil Pyzer - grand and electric piano, organ, alto and tenor saxophone
- Mickey Donnelly - alto and tenor saxophone, clarinet, flute
- Alan St. Clair - guitar

with:

- Barbara Pennington - backing vocals on B4
- Mae McKenna, Lorenza Johnson, Jackie Challenor - backing vocals on A2, B1, B4
- Simon Gardener, Steve Sidwell - trumpet on A2, B4
- Steve Sidwell - flugelhorn on B4

Technical

- Adam Moseley - engineer
- Adam Moseley, Clive Martin, Rusty Egan - mixing
