= Theatre of Hate =

British post-punk band

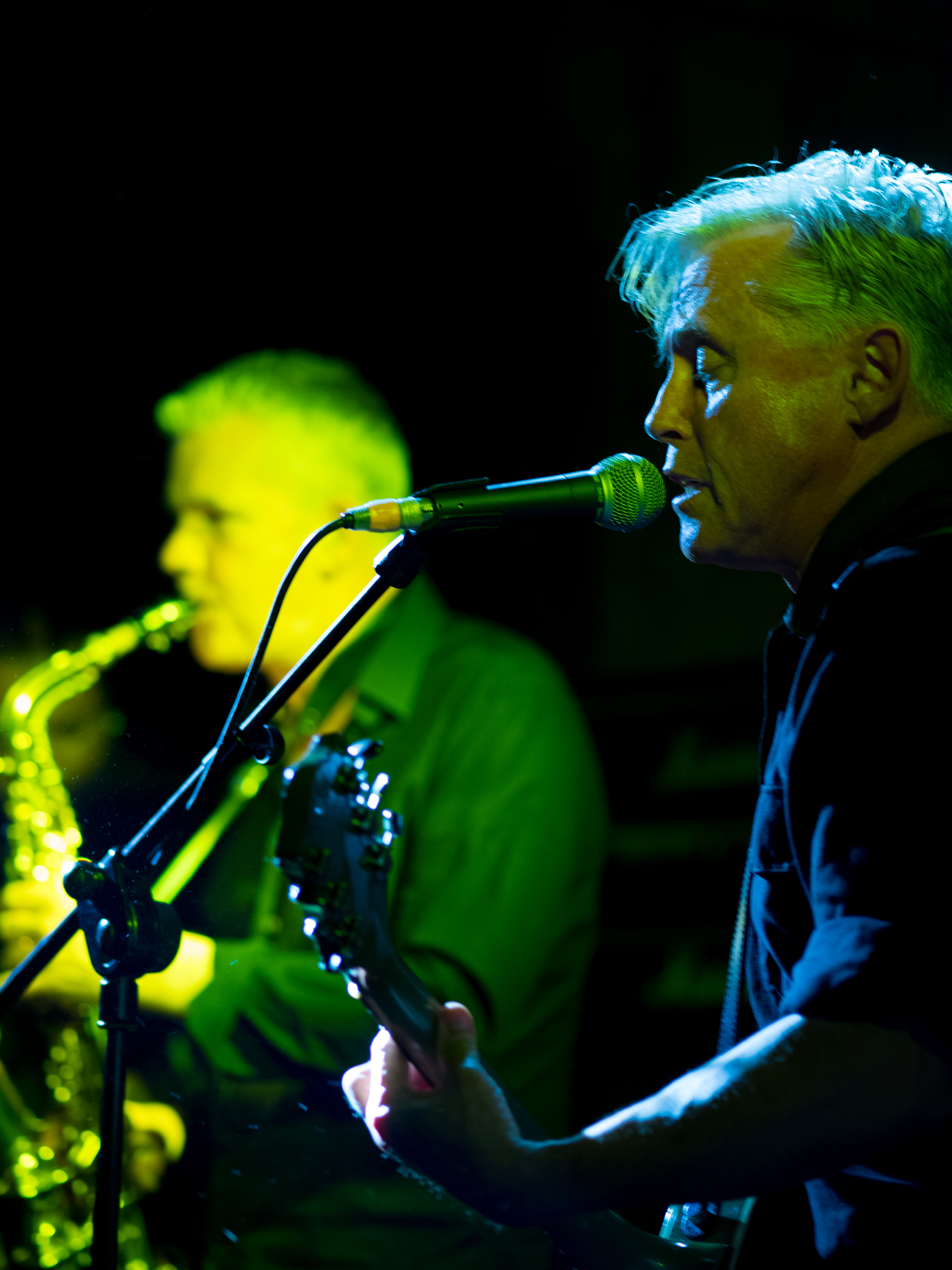
- Theatre of Hate (2015)

Background information
- Origin: London, England
- Genres: Post-punk; gothic rock
- Years active: 1980–1983, 1991, 1993–1996, 2005–present
- Labels: Burning Rome, Straight Music, Mau Mau, Anagram, Dojo, Receiver, Snapper Music, Easterstone, Eastersnow Recording Company
- Spinoffs: Spear of Destiny, Kirk Brandon's 10:51
- Spinoff of: The Pack, The Straps
- Members: Kirk Brandon; Stan Stammers; Chris Bell; Clive Osbourne
- Past members: Steve Guthrie; John Lennard; Luke Rendle; Billy Duffy; Nigel Preston; Mark Thwaite; Pete Barnacle; Volker Janssen; John McNutt; Art Smith; Knut Knutson; Craig Adams; Danny Ferrani; Adrian Portas; Mike Kelly
- Website: kirkbrandon.com

Theatre of Hate are a British post-punk band formed in London, England, in 1980.

Led by singer-songwriter and guitarist Kirk Brandon (formerly of The Pack), the original group also consisted of bassist Stan Stammers (formerly of The Straps and The Epileptics), saxophonist John "Boy" Lennard, guitarist Steve Guthrie and drummer Luke Rendle (formerly of Crisis and The Straps).

== The Pack ==
The Pack were a British punk rock band formed in 1978, comprising Kirk Brandon on guitars and vocals, Simon Werner (died 26 November 2010) on guitars, Jonathan Werner on bass, and Rab Fae Beith (later of UK Subs) on drums. Beith was eventually replaced by Jim Walker. The band released two singles in 1979, ""Heathen" and "King of Kings", and the Kirk Brandon & The Pack of Lies EP in 1980, before splitting. Their posthumous releases were the Long Live the Past EP (1982), The Pack Live 1982 live album, recorded in 1979 and released on cassette only on Walker's Donut Records label, and the collection Dead Ronin (2001).

== Discography ==
=== Live albums ===
- The Pack Live (1982, Donut Records)

=== Compilation albums ===
- Dead Ronin (2001, Yeaah!)

=== Singles and EPs ===
Title	Release date	Label	UK Indie Chart position
"Heathen"/"Brave New Soldiers"	1979	SS Label	–
"King of Kings"/"Number 12"	November 1979	Rough Trade Records	–
Kirk Brandon & The Pack of Lies EP	1980	SS Label	–
Long Live the Past EP	April 1982	Cyclops	No. 12

== Theatre of Hate ==
In 1980, The Pack disbanded. Joined by Luke Rendle (drums), Steve Guthrie (guitar), and John Lennard (saxophone), bassist Stan Stammers completed Brandon's line-up to form Theatre of Hate; the Werner brothers subsequently joined The Straps, the street punk band Stammers had played for prior. Inspired by Antonin Artaud's book Theatre and its Double, the new band took its name from the concept of the Theatre of Cruelty: "Artaud called for the emotional involvement of the audience. Singer Brandon borrowed the thespian term because he was trying to do the same."

"Original Sin", Theatre of Hate's first single, was released in November 1980 as a double A-side with "Legion"; reaching No. 5 in the UK Indie Chart, it was followed by the singles "Rebel Without a Brain" in April 1981, and "Nero" in July. Early attention focused on the band as a live act, its full-length debut in 1981 being the album He Who Dares Wins (Live at the Warehouse Leeds), released on vinyl by Burning Rome Records. Guthrie left the band shortly after the album's release. Another live recording followed, Live at the Lyceum, issued on cassette, also in 1981.

In August 1981, Mick Jones of The Clash produced Westworld, Theatre of Hate's first (and only) studio album to be released prior to the band's dissolution the following year. Guitarist Billy Duffy (formerly of The Nosebleeds) joined the band soon after the album had been recorded, and drummer Rendle was replaced by Nigel Preston. Heralded by the Top 40 single "Do You Believe in the West World" (which afforded the new line-up the band's one appearance on Top of the Pops), Westworld was released in February 1982 by Burning Rome Records, peaking at No. 17 the following month during its seven-week run in the UK Albums Chart. Recorded in September 1981 in Berlin, the live album He Who Dares Wins was also released in February in an attempt to curtail the sale of bootlegged recordings of Theatre of Hate concerts.

A follow-up single, "The Hop", was released in May 1982 and peaked at No. 70. Of the two further singles planned for release, only "Eastworld" was issued, in August. In 1984, and subsequent to Theatre of Hate's split two years previous, Burning Rome Records released Revolution, a compilation album that spent three weeks in the UK Albums Chart, peaking at No. 67. This posthumous album also included "Americanos", Theatre of Hate's final, unreleased single.

== Other projects ==
Brandon went on to front Spear of Destiny with bassist Stammers. Brandon also was a founding member of the punk supergroup Dead Men Walking, while Stammers formed Plastic Eaters in 1996.

Preston played with Sex Gang Children before joining former bandmate Duffy as drummer for The Cult on their 1984 album Dreamtime. Preston later played with The Baby Snakes and The Gun Club. He died in 1992.

== Reformation ==
Theatre of Hate reformed in 1991 for the Return to 8 tour, which included original band members Brandon, Stammers and Lennard, with the addition of three Spear of Destiny members, guitarist Mark Thwaite (also formerly of The Mission), drummer Pete Barnacle and keyboard player Volker Janssen. A live recording of the London Astoria show featuring this line-up was later included in the Act 4 compilation.

Theatre of Hate's unreleased second studio album, recorded in 1982, was released as Ten Years After in 1993.

In 1994, a line-up of Brandon, Stammers, guitarist John McNutt and drummer Art Smith went into Mix-O-Lydian Studio in Boonton, New Jersey with producer Brad Morrison to record a new album under the Theatre of Hate banner. As Stone in the Rain, it was released by Anagram Records in 1995, credited to Kirk Brandon's 10:51; it was released in the US a year later as a Theatre of Hate album, retitled Retribution.

A 1996 tour featuring a line-up of Brandon, McNutt, Smith and new bassist Knut Knutson resulted in the live album Retribution Over the Westworld, issued that year by Receiver Records. Another album of 1982 material recorded with Jones, Aria of the Devil, was released in 1998 by Snapper Music, while Live at the Lyceum was reissued as Love Is a Ghost in 2000.

To coincide with Westworld's 25th anniversary, Theatre of Hate reformed for a week-long tour culminating at the Carling Academy Islington on 29 April 2007. Of the original line-up, only Stammers was unavailable, due to conflicting schedules and family commitments in the US where he now lives. Replacing him was Craig Adams (former bassist for numerous bands including The Sisters of Mercy, The Mission, The Cult, The Alarm and Spear of Destiny), joining Brandon, Guthrie, Lennard and Rendle for the reunion.

In May 2012, Theatre of Hate, with a line-up of Brandon, Stammers and Lennard, augmented by Adrian Portas (New Model Army, Sex Gang Children, Spear of Destiny) on guitar and Mike Kelly on drums, reunited again for three Westworld 30th anniversary concerts, held in Bristol, London and Crewe. 2013 concerts in Birmingham and Bristol with this line-up were self-released as the CD/DVD set Live 2013.

After Kelly was replaced by Danny Ferrani, Theatre of Hate recorded a new four-song EP, Slave, self-released in 2014,. The band issued a free single, "Day of the Dog", in 2015.

In 2016, Theatre of Hate released the album Kinshi, self-released via PledgeMusic. It was followed by Black Irony the following year and Utsukushi-sa (A Thing Of Beauty) in 2020.

== Discography ==
=== Studio albums ===
- Westworld (1982, Burning Rome Records) (UK No. 17)
- Ten Years After (1993, Mau Mau Records)
- Retribution (1996, Dojo Records)
- Aria of the Devil (1998, Snapper Music)
- Kinshi (2016, self-released)
- Black Irony (2017, self-released)
- Utsukushi-sa (A Thing Of Beauty) (2020, Eastersnow Recording Company)

=== Live albums ===
- He Who Dares Wins (Live at the Warehouse Leeds) (1981, Burning Rome Records) (UK Indie No. 1)
- Live at the Lyceum (1981, Straight Music)
- He Who Dares Wins (1982, Burning Rome Records) (UK Indie No. 3)
- Original Sin · Live (1985, Dojo Records) (UK Indie No. 12)
- Retribution Over the Westworld (1996, Receiver Records)
- He Who Dares Wins/He Who Dares Wins II (1996, Dojo Records)
- Love Is a Ghost (2000, Receiver Records)
- Live at the Astoria 91 (2006, Easterstone)
- Live in 82 (2006, Easterstone)
- Live in Sweden (2006, Easterstone)
- Live 2013 (2014, self-released)

=== Compilation albums ===
- Revolution (1983, Burning Rome Records) (UK No. 67, UK Indie No. 1)
- The Complete Singles Collection (1995, Anagram Records)
- The Best Of (1996, Dojo Records)
- Act 1 (Revolution and Live in Sweden 81) (1998, Eastworld Recordings)
- Act 2 (Ten Years After and He Who Dares Wins 1) (1998, Eastworld Recordings)
- Act 3 (Retribution and Live at Bingley Hall 82) (1998, Eastworld Recordings)
- Act 4 (T.O.H the Sessions and Live at the Astoria 91) (1998, Eastworld Recordings)
- Act 5 (The Singles and He Who Dares 2) (1998, Eastworld Recordings)
- The Best of Theatre of Hate (2000, Recall2cd)
- The Singles' (2001, Neon)
- Hits from the Westworld (2001, Dressed to Kill)
- Propaganda – The Best of Theatre of Hate (2001, Music Club)
- The Singles Collection (2002, Yeaah!)
- The Sessions (2006, Easterstone)
- Artificial Sunlight with Spear of Destiny (2011, Easterstone)
- Westworld 30th Anniversary (2014, Eastersnow Recording Company)

=== Singles ===
Title	Release date	label	Album	UK Singles Chart position	UK Indie Chart position
"Original Sin"/"Legion"	November 1980	SS Label	–	–	5
"Rebel Without a Brain"/"My Own Invention"	April 1981	Burning Rome Records	–	–	3
"Nero"/"Incinerator"	July 1981	Burning Rome Records	–	–	2
"Do You Believe in the West World"/"Propaganda"	January 1982	Burning Rome Records	Westworld	40	1
"The Hop"/"Conquistador"	May 1982	Burning Rome Records	–	70	–
"Eastworld"/"Assegai"	November 1982	Burning Rome Records	–	–	3
Slave EP	2014	self-released	–	–	–
"Day of the Dog"	December 2015	Eastersnow Recording Company	–	–	–

== Reference work ==
- Record Collector No. 102 (February 1988)
- Chart runs in the UK Singles Chart since 1952
