= One-eyed jack (disambiguation) =

One-eyed jack is a playing card in a standard deck of cards.

One-eyed jack may also refer to:

== Music ==
- One Eyed Jacks (album), a 1984 album by Spear of Destiny
- One-Eyed Jack (album), a 1978 album by Garland Jeffreys
- "One-Eyed Jacks with Moustaches", a 1976 song by Slade
- One-Eyed Jack (band), a jam band from Rutherford, NJ

== Media ==
- One-Eyed Jacks, a 1961 Western film directed by Marlon Brando
- One Eyed Jacks (Twin Peaks), a brothel on the show Twin Peaks
- "One-Eyed Jacks" (The Punisher), an episode of The Punisher
- Alone in the Dark: One-Eyed Jack's Revenge, the 1993 sequel to the video game Alone in the Dark
- One-Eyed Jack, a 1970s British comic strip
- One-Eyed Jack, leader of the alien Bounty Hunters working for Damocles and the Sword in the Gen^{13} comics and the "Fire from Heaven" crossover.
- One-Eyed Jacks, a 1991 anthology in the Wild Cards series edited by George R. R. Martin

== Other uses ==
- "One-Eyed Jack," an unidentified murder victim discovered in Tok, Alaska
- Egg in the basket, an egg fried in a hole in a slice of bread
