= Omega Point (album) =

Studio album by Spear of Destiny
- Released: 8 November 2010
- Genre: Post-punk
- Length: 41:37
- Label: Eastersnow
- Producer: Kirk Brandon, Chrisophe Bride

Spear of Destiny chronology
Imperial Prototype (2007)	Omega Point (2010)

Omega Point Is the twelfth studio album by Spear of Destiny. The album was made available on Kirk Brandon's official site before the actual release date as a direct download. Unlike the last album, this one was made available on iTunes.

== Track listing ==
All tracks composed by Kirk Brandon

1. "Bold Grenadier" - 1:45
2. "Undertow" - 4:29
3. "Suicide God" - 5:44
4. "Bloody Bill Anderson" - 3:51
5. "They Do As Locusts Do" - 3:41
6. "Model Number One" - 4:04
7. "Kalashnikov" - 3:34
8. "Hubris" - 3:19
9. "People Who Live On the Moon" - 2:51
10. "Windscale" - 4:23
11. "Guinness, Ghosts and Rum" - 4:09

== Personnel ==
Spear of Destiny

- Kirk Brandon - vocals, guitar
- Craig Adams - bass
- Adrian Portas - guitar
- Mike Kelly - drums
- Steve Allan Jones - keyboards

with:

- Clint Boon - Farfisa keyboard on "Bloody Bill Anderson"
