= One Eyed Jacks (album) =

Studio album by Spear of Destiny
- Released: April 1984
- Genre: Rock
- Length: 37:51
- Label: Epic, Burning Rome Records
- Producer: Nick Tauber

Spear of Destiny chronology
Grapes of Wrath (1983)	One Eyed Jacks (1984)	World Service (1985)

One Eyed Jacks is the second studio album by Spear of Destiny, released by Burning Rome Records in 1984.

== Track listing ==
All songs written by Kirk Brandon

1. "Rainmaker" - 2:55
2. "Young Men" - 3:13
3. "Everything You Ever Wanted" - 4:36
4. "Don't Turn Away" - 3:38
5. "Liberator" - 3:39
6. "Prisoner of Love" - 3:36
7. "Playground of the Rich" - 4:45
8. "Forbidden Planet" - 3:14
9. "Attica" - 2:34
10. "These Days Are Gone" - 5:41

== Personnel ==
Spear of Destiny

- Kirk Brandon - vocals, guitar
- Stan Stammers - bass guitar
- Dolphin Taylor - drums, vocals
- Neil Pyzer - keyboards, saxophone, piccolo flute
- Mickey Donnelly - saxophone
- Alan St. Clair - guitar

Technical

- Gary Langan - mixing
- Pete Wilson - mixing on "Prisoner of Love"
- David Levine, Steve Rapport - photography
