= Alan St. Clair =

British guitarist (born 1959)

Alan St. Clair (born 18 May 1959) is a British guitarist, who played with several prominent punk and new wave musicians in the 1970s and 1980s.

== Biography ==
In 1977, he helped form punk band Dog Days, alongside Simon Le Bon, later of Duran Duran. Other members included Peter Johns, Carol Isaacs and Olivier Behzadi. One demo tape was made, one concert played before they disbanded when Le Bon left London for University in Birmingham. After the band dissolved in 1978, St. Clair continued to work with Peter Johns, and in 1980 formed Voxpop, alongside Ian Johns, Steve Wilcox and Neil Pyzer, until 1981 when they disbanded. The same year, he formed Dive Dive Dive with David Pearson, Vincent Pitt, Patrick Ahern and John Pilny and Beau Shave. Demos and concerts followed.

In 1982, he also began to work with Howard Devoto (singer of Buzzcocks and Magazine), helping him with his solo career, playing guitar on his album, Jerky Versions of the Dream. North America and European tours followed. While he was with Howard Devoto, he joined Spear of Destiny. He left Spear of Destiny in 1986 after demos were made of the album that became Outland. St. Clair was asked to rejoin Spear in 1988 to tour their new album, The Price You Pay. Further demos were made by Kirk Brandon and St. Clair, some of which would later appear on Sod's Law, although not performed by him.

St. Clair was also introduced to various performing artists including Alex Gifford of Propellorheads. Demos were made, but no concerts ensued. St. Clair's last official band was ATR, alongside Harry Matthews, Richard Ramsay, Stuart Johnson and Mark Johnson.

He now lives in Portugal designing and producing bespoke furniture and guitars.
