= Sod's Law (album) =

Studio album by Spear of Destiny
- Released: October 1992
- Studio: Eastcote Studios, London; except track 8, Glasstank, London
- Genre: Rock
- Length: 61:25
- Label: Burning Rome Records (1992); Original Masters/Snapper Music (1997 re-issue)
- Producer: Zeus B. Held and Philip Bagenal; except track 8, Terry Razor

Spear of Destiny chronology
The Price You Pay (1988)	Sod's Law (1992)	Religion (1997)

Sod's Law is the sixth studio album by Spear of Destiny, released by Burning Rome Records in 1992 and subsequently re-issued by Snapper Music in 1997.

== Track listing (1997 reissue) ==
All songs written by Kirk Brandon

1. "Goldmine" - 3:55
2. "Into The Rising Sun" - 4:04
3. "Black Country Girl" - 4:30
4. "Bull Comes Down" - 4:12
5. "Slow Me Down" - 4:58
6. "Taking Care Of Business" - 4:50
7. "In The City" - 4:20
8. "Babylon Talking" - 4:59
9. "Crystalize" - 4:35
10. "Captain America" - 3:45
11. "Chemical Head" (Bonus)
12. "Paradise" (Bonus)
13. "Burn Out" (Bonus)

== Personnel ==
Spear of Destiny

- Kirk Brandon - Vocals and guitar
- Mark Gemini Thwaite - Lead and rhythm guitar, bass guitar
- Pete Barnacle - Drums and percussion
- John "Boy" Lennard - Saxophone
- Stan Stammers - Bass guitar

with:

- Fiona Barrow - Violin on 2, 5, 7
- Volker Janssen - Keyboards on 4
