= Volunteers (Spear of Destiny album) =

Studio album by Spear Of Destiny
- Released: 11 September 2001
- Recorded: 2000
- Genre: Post-punk
- Length: 49:16
- Label: Do-Little
- Producer: Kirk Brandon, John Mallison, Roger Tebbutt

Spear Of Destiny chronology
Religion (1997)	Volunteers (2001)	Morning Star (2003)

Professional ratings
Review scores
Source	Rating
Allmusic	3/5 stars

Voltunteers is the eighth full-length studio album by British post-punk band, Spear of Destiny. The album features a re-recording of "Never Take Me Alive", the band's highest-placing single.

== Track listing ==
All tracks composed by Kirk Brandon

1. "Some Kind of Normal" - 4:40
2. "Nothing Under the Sun" - 4:44
3. "Silver Forest" - 4:14
4. "Volunteers" - 1:18
5. "Paranoia" - 3:26
6. "Judas" - 5:25
7. "Never Take Me Alive" - 4:27
8. "Uphill Backwards" - 4:59
9. "Penny Black" - 3:56
10. "Iceman" - 4:15
11. "End of Days" - 7:53

== Personnel ==
Spear of Destiny

- Kirk Brandon - vocals, guitar
- John McNutt - guitar
- James Yardley - bass
- Art Smith - drums
