= Loadestone =

Studio album by Spear of Destiny
- Released: 2005
- Genre: Post-punk
- Length: 1:00:50
- Label: Eastersnow

Spear of Destiny chronology
Morning Star (2003)	Loadestone (2005)	Imperial Prototype (2007)

Loadestone is the tenth studio album by Spear Of Destiny. The album was the first release on Brandon's own record label Eastersnow. The album features a cover of "Transmission" originally by Joy Division, one of Brandon's favourite bands.

== Track listing ==
All tracks composed by Kirk Brandon; except where indicated

1. "Age of Unreason" - 4:42
2. "In Transit" - 5:37
3. "Philadelphia" - 3:52
4. "Transmission" (Bernard Sumner, Ian Curtis, Peter Hook, Stephen Morris) - 5:00
5. "Pskotik" - 5:37
6. "The Devils Game" - 4:39
7. "Cogs" - 5:42
8. "Resurrection" - 2:32
9. "Last Man Standing" - 4:52
10. "Parade for the Living" - 5:41
11. "Red Dust Rocketeers" - 3:27
12. "Palestine" - 3:05
13. "Requiem for the Presidents" - 5:41
14. "Invaders" - 0:29

== Personnel ==
Spear of Destiny

- Kirk Brandon - vocals, guitar
- Steve Allan Jones - keyboards
- James Yardley - bass
- Warren Wilson - guitar
- Chris Bell - drums, percussion
- Derek Forbes - bass
