= Religion (Spear of Destiny album) =

Studio album by Spear of Destiny
- Released: 1997
- Studio: The Levellers' Studio, Brighton
- Genre: Rock
- Length: 47:04
- Label: Eastworld Recordings
- Producer: Jon Mallison, Kirk Brandon

Spear of Destiny chronology
Sod's Law (1992)	Religion (1997)	Volunteers (2000)

Religion is the seventh studio album by Spear of Destiny, released by Eastworld Recordings in 1997.

== Track listing ==
All songs written by Kirk Brandon.

1. "Rainy Day" - 4:55
2. "Iona" - 4:44
3. "Prison Planet" - 4:38
4. "Magic Eye" - 2:11
5. "Mile In My Shoes" - 5:32
6. "X" - 4:18
7. "Female Hero (7 Letters)" - 4:49
8. "Werewolve" - 5:37
9. "Slayride" - 4:34
10. "Total Kontrol" - 5:53

== Personnel ==
Spear of Destiny

- Kirk Brandon - vocals, guitar
- Art Smith - drums
- John McNutt - guitars
- Mark Celvallos - bass
