= The Price You Pay =

Studio album by Spear of Destiny
- Released: 10 October 1988
- Genre: Rock
- Label: Virgin
- Producer: Alan Shacklock

Spear of Destiny chronology
Outland (1987)	The Price You Pay (1988)	Sod's Law (1992)

The Price You Pay is the fifth studio album by Spear of Destiny, released by Virgin Records in 1988 (see 1988 in music).

== Track listing ==
All songs written by Kirk Brandon

1. "So In Love With You" - 4:22
2. "Tinseltown" - 5:15
3. "The Price" - 5:11
4. "I Remember" - 5:50
5. "Dreamtime" - 4:06
6. "Radio Radio" - 3:09
7. "If The Guns" - 4:10
8. "View from a Tree" - 3:40
9. "Junkman" - 5:10
10. "Soldier Soldier" - 2:48
11. "Brave New World" - 4:55

== Personnel ==
Spear of Destiny

- Kirk Brandon - vocals, guitar
- Pete Barnacle - drums
- Volker Janssen - keyboards
- Chris Bostock - bass
- Alan St. Clair - guitar

Technical

- Justin Niebank - engineer
- Anton Corbijn - photography

"Special thanks to: Nancy Brandon, Bunter, Sharkey, Steve Lewis, Rock'n' Roll Hampster, Danny and Richard (L.A.), And of course T.Razor (back cover)"
