= Morning Star (Spear of Destiny album) =

Studio album by Spear of Destiny
- Released: 18 March 2003
- Genre: Pop/rock
- Length: 49:24
- Label: United States Dist
- Producer: Kirk Brandon, Martin Wilding, Mike Jones

Spear of Destiny chronology
Volunteers (2001)	Morning Star (2003)	Loadestone (2005)

Morning Star is the ninth studio album released by Spear of Destiny.

== Track listing ==
All tracks composed by Kirk Brandon

1. "Lucky Man" - 4:42
2. "Mayday" - 4:11
3. "Half Life" - 4:18
4. "This Wonderful Life" - 4:31
5. "Better Man" - 3:11
6. "White Rose" - 4:31
7. "She" - 5:40
8. "Belongings" - 4:41
9. "Mermaid" - 4:05
10. "Warleigh Road" - 6:39
11. "Crowley" - 2:57

== Personnel ==
Spear of Destiny

- Kirk Brandon - vocals, guitar
- Warren Wilson - guitar
- James Yardley - bass
- Danny Farrant - drums
- John Lennard - saxophone

with:

- Claire Colley - voice on "She"
