= Faith Divides Us – Death Unites Us =

Studio album by Paradise Lost
- Released: 25 September 2009
- Recorded: February–March 2009; July 2009 (Lost in Prague tracks)
- Studios: Fascination Street Studios, Örebro: Finnvox Studios; Smecky Music Studios, Prague (Lost in Prague tracks)
- Genres: Gothic metal; doom metal
- Length: 46:02
- Label: Century Media Records
- Producer: Jens Bogren

Paradise Lost chronology
Drown in Darkness – The Early Demos (2009)	Faith Divides Us – Death Unites Us (2009)	Tragic Idol (2012)

Professional ratings
Review scores
Source	Rating
AllMusic	3.5/5 stars
Kerrang	4/5 stars
Metal Hammer	(8/10)
Rock Sound	(9/10)
Sputnikmusic	4/5 stars

Faith Divides Us – Death Unites Us is the twelfth studio album by British gothic metal band Paradise Lost, released through Century Media in September 2009. The album cover is based upon the Danse Macabre – "The Abbot" woodcut, first published in 1538.

== Track listing ==
No.	Title	Length
1.	"As Horizons End"	5:26
2.	"I Remain"	4:09
3.	"First Light"	5:00
4.	"Frailty"	4:25
5.	"Faith Divides Us – Death Unites Us"	4:21
6.	"The Rise of Denial"	4:47
7.	"Living with Scars"	4:22
8.	"Last Regret"	4:24
9.	"Universal Dream"	4:17
10.	"In Truth"	4:51

Japanese edition bonus tracks
No.	Title	Length
11.	"Cardinal Zero"	4:28
12.	"Back on Disaster"	4:15

Special edition
No.	Title	additional notes	Length
11.	"Cardinal Zero"		4:28
12.	"Faith Divides Us – Death Unites Us"	Lost in Prague Orchestra mix	4:17
13.	"Last Regret"	Lost in Prague Orchestra mix	4:20

== Charts ==
Chart (2009)	Peak position
Austria	54
Belgium (Flanders)	66
Belgium (Wallonia)	63
Dutch Albums Chart	84
Finnish Albums Chart	22
Hungarian Albums Chart	39
Japanese Albums Chart	281
Sweden	29
Switzerland	52
UK Albums Chart	122

== Personnel ==
=== Paradise Lost ===
- Nick Holmes – vocals, lyrics
- Gregor Mackintosh – lead guitar; keyboards, music composition
- Aaron Aedy – rhythm guitar
- Steve Edmondson – bass
- Peter Damin – session drums

=== Orchestral ===
- Florian Magnus Maier – arrangements
- Lucie Svehlova – concertmaster
- Miriam Nemcova – conductor
- City of Prague Philharmonic Orchestra – orchestration on the "Prague Mixes"
- Ronny Milanowicz – orchestration (8)

=== Production ===
- Jens Bogren – audio mixing
- HL (Heino Leja) – vinyl cut mastering
- Jan Holzner – recording engineering
- Johan Ornborg – engineer

=== Album design ===
- Chiaki Nozu – photography
- Stefan Wibbeke – layout, artwork
- Takehiko Maeda (前田岳彦 (Maeda Takehiko)) – liner notes

=== Management ===
- Andy Farrow – management
- Vicky Langham – assistant management
- Peter Button – legal management
- Colin Young – accountancy
- Paul Bolton – agent
- James Fitzpatrick – contractor

=== Other credits ===
- Published by Element Music Publishing
- Mixed, Mastered and Produced at Fascination Street Studios
- Additional Mastering at Optimal Media Production – B979423 & B979424
- Pressed by Arvato Digital Services – 53798176
