= The Anatomy of Melancholy (album) =

- Cover art by Seth Siro Anton

Live album by Paradise Lost
- Released: UK - 23 May 2008
- Recorded: 12 April 2007
- Venue: KOKO (London)
- Genre: Gothic metal
- Length: 88:12
- Label: Century Media Records
- Producer: Paul M. Green

Paradise Lost chronology
In Requiem (2007)	The Anatomy of Melancholy (2008)	Drown in Darkness – The Early Demos (2009)

The Anatomy of Melancholy is the second live album by British gothic metal band Paradise Lost. It was recorded on 12 April 2007 at the Koko (London). The album was released on double DVD and double CD. There is also a deluxe 4-disc edition containing both aforementioned releases. The artwork was provided by Greek artist Seth Siro Anton.

== Track listing ==
1. "Intro"
2. "The Enemy"
3. "Grey"
4. "Erased"
5. "Red Shift"
6. "So Much Is Lost"
7. "Sweetness"
8. "Praise Lamented Shade"
9. "Pity the Sadness"
10. "Forever Failure"
11. "Once Solemn"
12. "As I Die"
13. "Embers Fire"
14. "Mouth"
15. "No Celebration"
16. "Eternal"
17. "True Belief"
18. "One Second"
19. "The Last Time"
20. "Gothic"
21. "Say Just Words"
22. "Isolate" (DVD Only, not listed on the tracklisting)

== Track information ==
- Track 1 is from The Anatomy of Melancholy
- Track 2 & 8 are from In Requiem
- Track 3 & 5 are from Paradise Lost
- Track 4, 15, & 22 are from Symbol of Life
- Track 6 is from Host
- Track 7, 13 & 17 are from Icon
- Track 9, 12 is from Shades of God
- Track 10, 11, & 19 are from Draconian Times
- Track 14 is from Believe in Nothing
- Track 16 & 20 are from Gothic
- Track 18 & 21 are from One Second

== Personnel ==
- Nick Holmes – vocals
- Greg Mackintosh – lead guitars
- Aaron Aedy – rhythm guitars
- Steve Edmondson – bass guitar
- Jeff Singer – drums

== Charts ==
Chart (2008)	Peak position
French Albums (SNEP)	175
German Albums (Offizielle Top 100)	42
