= Paradise Lost (Paradise Lost album) =

- Cover art by Seth Siro Anton

Studio album by Paradise Lost
- Released: 17 March 2005
- Recorded: April–September 2004
- Studio: Chapel Studios, Lincolnshire and Hollypark Lane, Los Angeles
- Genre: Gothic metal, gothic rock
- Length: 54:47
- Label: BMG, GUN
- Producer: Rhys Fulber

Paradise Lost chronology
Symbol of Life (2002)	Paradise Lost (2005)	In Requiem (2007)

Paradise Lost is the tenth studio album by British gothic metal band Paradise Lost, released on 17 March 2005. It was recorded between January and June 2004 at Chapel Studios, Lincolnshire and Hollypark Lane, Los Angeles; it was mixed and mastered at Green Jacket Studios.

This is the first album with Jeff Singer, who joined the band after the writing of the album was mostly finished and contributed to the creative process to a less extent than the follow-up, In Requiem.

The band had songs such as "Sedative God", which was written for this album but did not end up on any of the releases of this album (such as singles) but instead ended up on the In Requiem, while other songs such as "Through the Silence" and "Sanctimonious You", although not released on any of the reissues of this album, ended up being on the "Forever After" single CD and the B-Sides & Rarities album. The aforementioned single also has a music video.

== Track listing ==
All songs written by Gregor MacKintosh and Nick Holmes.

No.	Title	Length
1.	"Don't Belong"	4:19
2.	"Close Your Eyes"	4:22
3.	"Grey"	3:28
4.	"Redshift"	3:31
5.	"Forever After"	3:47
6.	"Sun Fading"	3:29
7.	"Laws of Cause"	4:09
8.	"All You Leave Behind"	3:01
9.	"Accept the Pain"	3:20
10.	"Shine"	4:08
11.	"Spirit"	4:20
12.	"Over the Madness"	5:17

Dark Element, Century Media and Icarus reissue
No.	Title	Length
13.	"Let Me Drown"	3:10
14.	"A Side You'll Never Know"	4:09

GUN Records digipak
No.	Title	additional notes	Length
13.	"Don't Belong"	String Dub Mix	3:49
14.	"Over the Madness"	String Dub Mix	5:12

== Forever After ==
"Forever After"

Single by Paradise Lost

from the album Paradise Lost
- A-side: "Forever After"
- Released: 7 February 2005
- Genre: Gothic metal
- Length: 4:48
- Label: GUN / Supersonic Records
- Songwriter(s): Nick Holmes, Greg Mackintosh

Paradise Lost singles chronology
"'Small Town Boy'" (2003)	"Forever After" (2005)	"'The Enemy'" (2007)

Forever After is a maxi-single from the album.

No.	Title	Length
1.	"Forever After"	3:48
2.	"Through the Silence"	3:24
3.	"Sanctimonious You"	3:27
4.	"Let Me Drown"	3:10
5.	"A Side You'll Never Know"	4:10

DVD content
No.	Title	Length
6.	"Behind the Scenes at the Listening Session Cologne"	4:00
7.	"Live Impressions"	3:27
8.	"The Making of Forever After"	4:59

== Personnel ==
=== Paradise Lost ===
- Nick Holmes — vocals, lyrics
- Greg Mackintosh — lead guitar; keyboards, music
- Aaron Aedy — rhythm guitar
- Steve Edmondson — bass guitar
- Jeff Singer — drums

=== Guests ===
- Leah Randi - "choir-esque" chorus on "Forever After"
- Heather Thompson - backing vocals on "Forever After" and "Over The Madness"
- Chris Elliot - keyboards and string arrangements
- Rhys Fulber - keyboards
- Sam Scott-Hunter - photography
- Greg Reely - audio recording, audio mixing and audio mastering
- Ewan Davies - assistant engineer
- Will Bartle - assistant engineer
- Andy Farrow - management
- Vicky Langham - assisted management
- Spiros Antoniou - album cover

== Charts ==
Chart (2005)	Peak position
Austrian Albums (Ö3 Austria)	34
Belgian Albums (Ultratop Flanders)	92
Finnish Albums (Suomen virallinen lista)	36
French Albums (SNEP)	63
German Albums (Offizielle Top 100)	18
Swedish Albums (Sverigetopplistan)	21
Swiss Albums (Schweizer Hitparade)	59
