= Drown in Darkness – The Early Demos =

Drown in Darkness

Compilation album by Paradise Lost
- Released: 25 May 2009
- Genre: Death-doom
- Length: 57:26
- Label: Century Media Records

Paradise Lost chronology
The Anatomy of Melancholy (2008)	Drown in Darkness (2009)	Faith Divides Us – Death Unites Us (2009)

Drown in Darkness – The Early Demos is the third compilation album by British gothic metal band Paradise Lost, consisting of demos released in 1988 and 1989. Tracks 1 through 3 are taken from the band's 1988 demo "Paradise Lost"; tracks 4 through 6 are taken from the band's 1989 demo "Frozen Illusion"; tracks 7 through 12 are taken from the band's other 1989 demo "Plains of Desolation". There was a trailer of this demo, where most of the band members behind the demos were interviewed concerning the demos and the time surrounding the recording and releasing of the demos.

== Track listing ==
1. "Drown in Darkness" – 4:38
2. "Internal Torment" – 5:05
3. "Morbid Existence" – 2:38
4. "Paradise Lost" – 5:24
5. "Our Saviour" – 5:40
6. "Frozen Illusion" – 5:16
7. "Internal Torment" (live) – 4:40
8. "Our Saviour" (live) – 5:56
9. "Plains of Desolation" (live) – 4:10
10. "Drown in Darkness" (live) – 4:37
11. "Paradise Lost" (live) – 5:34
12. "Nuclear Abomination" (live) – 3:48

== Personnel ==
- Nick Holmes - vocals
- Gregor Mackintosh - guitars
- Aaron Aedy - guitars
- Steve Edmondson - bass
- Matthew Archer - drums
