= Never Take Me Alive =

1987 single by Spear of Destiny

- 7-inch vinyl single

Single by Spear of Destiny

from the album Outland
- B-side: "Land of Shame"
- Released: 23 March 1987
- Genre: Rock; post-punk
- Length: 4:15
- Label: 10 Records; Virgin
- Songwriter(s): Kirk Brandon
- Producer(s): Zeus B. Held

Spear of Destiny singles chronology
"Strangers in Our Town" (1987)	"Never Take Me Alive" (1987)	"Was That You?" (1987)

"Never Take Me Alive" is a song by English rock band Spear of Destiny. It was released on 23 March 1987 as the second single (after "Strangers in Our Town" in January) from the band's fourth album, Outland. It achieved the band's highest ever UK chart placing, peaking at number 14.

The song was re-recorded in 1999 and released on their 2001 album Volunteers.

In 2012, the song was covered by the British heavy metal band Paradise Lost, who released it as a bonus track on the limited edition of their Tragic Idol album, as well as on the Tragic Illusion 25 compilation.

== Track listings ==
7": 10 Records/ TEN 162 United Kingdom (1987)

1. "Never Take Me Alive" – 4:15
2. "Land of Shame" – 3:16

12": 10 Records / TENT 162 United Kingdom (1987)

1. "Never Take Me Alive" (Extended version) – 6:18
2. "Land of Shame" (Extended mix) – 8:24
3. "Land of Shame" (Original version) – 2:51

7": Virgin/ PR 2080 United States (Promo EP) (1987)

1. "Never Take Me Alive" – 4:15
2. "Never Take Me Alive" (12" mix) – 6:18
3. "Land of Shame" – 3:16
4. "Land of Shame" (12" mix) - 6:38

== Charts ==
Chart (1987)	Peak position
Ireland (IRMA)	18
UK Singles (OCC)	14
