= Dead Men Walking =

English rock band

Dead Men Walking are an English-based rock supergroup with a multi national line-up, who have toured the UK, Ireland and the United States. From 2001 to 2006 they were led by Mike Peters of the Alarm and Kirk Brandon, of Spear of Destiny, with a varying cast of musicians. Since 2015, they split into two bands, one led by Peters called the Jack Tars, and another led by Brandon keeping the Dead Men Walking name.

== Career ==
The band started in 2001, with Brandon and Peters being joined by Pete Wylie (Wah!) and Glen Matlock (Sex Pistols) for the first live album. For the second album, Wylie was replaced by Billy Duffy (the Cult) and a drummer was added in Slim Jim Phantom (Stray Cats). For the third album, Duffy was replaced by Bruce Watson (Big Country). For the fourth and fifth albums, Watson dropped out and Matlock was replaced by Captain Sensible (the Damned) on bass.

The Peters/Brandon/Sensible/Phantom line-up recorded an original album in 2008, but it was never released as there were disagreements between the band members.

Eventually Peters revived the band in 2014 with Chris Cheney (the Living End) replacing Brandon. This line-up produced the first album of original material by the band, Easy Piracy, the previous releases having all been live albums.

Brandon also formed a new version of the band, with Jake Burns (Stiff Little Fingers) and Dave Ruffy and John "Segs" Jennings (both of Ruts DC). After a name dispute, Brandon kept the name and Peters renamed his band as the Jack Tars.

== Discography ==
=== Brandon/Peters line-up ===
- Live at Guildford (Resistance 001, 2001)
- Live at Leeds (Resistance 002, 2003)
- Live at The Darwen Library Theatre (Resistance 003, 2004) CD
- Live at The Darwen Library Theatre (Resistance DVD 002, 2004) DVD
- Live at CBGB New York City (Resistance 004, 2005)
- Graveyard Smashes Volume 1 (Resistance 005, 2006)

=== Peters line-up ===
- Easy Piracy (Slimstyle Records THIN0084, 2015)

=== Brandon line-up ===
- Live in Bristol (2016)

== Members ==
Dead Men Walking are now –

- Kirk Brandon – Spear Of Destiny, Theatre Of Hate
- Jake Burns – Stiff Little Fingers
- Dave Ruffy – Ruts DC
- John "Segs" Jennings – Ruts DC

The Jack Tars, are now –

- Mike Peters – The Alarm (singer/rhythm guitar)
- Chris Cheney – The Living End (lead guitar)
- Slim Jim Phantom – Stray Cats (drummer)
- Captain Sensible – The Damned (bass guitar)

=== Previous musicians include ===
- Pete Wylie – Wah!
- Glen Matlock – Sex Pistols
- Bruce Watson – Big Country

=== Guest musicians include ===
- Mick Jones - The Clash
- Topper Headon - The Clash
- Duff McKagan - Guns N' Roses
- Derek Forbes - Spear of Destiny, Simple Minds
- Billy Duffy - Theatre of Hate, The Cult
- Lemmy - Motörhead
- Brian Setzer - Stray Cats
- Pauline Black – The Selecter
- Fred Armisen - Trenchmouth, Saturday Night Live
- Mike Scott - The Waterboys
- Roddy Frame - Aztec Camera
- Ian McNabb - The Icicle Works
- Dave Dederer - Presidents of the United States of America
