= Spear of Destiny (band) =

British rock band

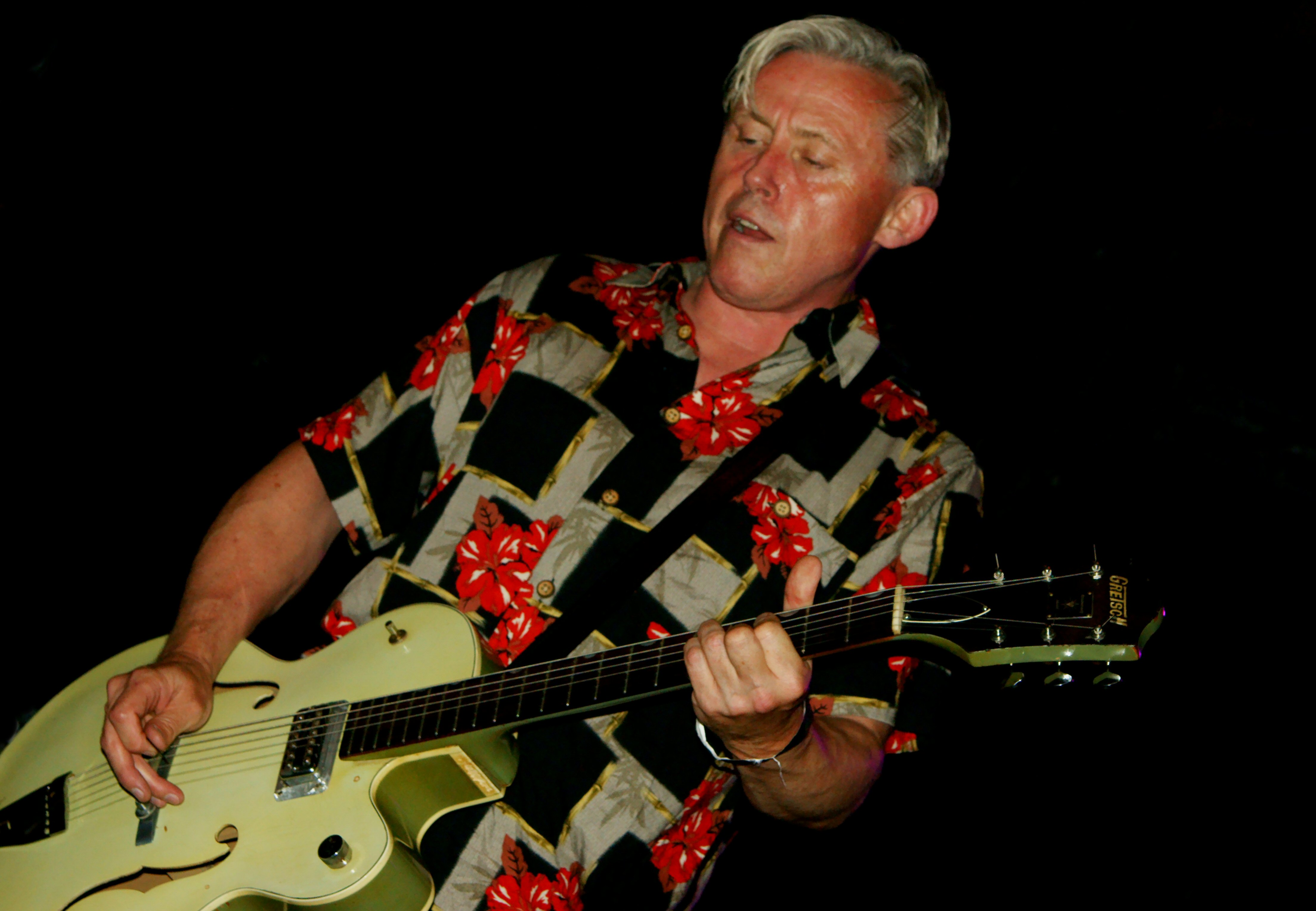
- Kirk Brandon of Spear of Destiny performing in London, 2012

Background information
- Origin: London, England
- Genres: Post-punk; alternative rock; indie rock
- Years active: 1982–present
- Labels: S.S.; Burning Rome; Epic; Virgin; Eastworld; Do-Little
- Members: Craig Adams; Kirk Brandon; Adrian Portas; Phil Martini; Steve Allan Jones
- Past members: Pete Barnacle; Steve Barnacle; Chris Bell; Stevie Blanchard; Chris Bostock; Mark Celvallos; Mickey Donnelly; Robin Goodridge; Lascelles James; Volker Janssen; John Boy Lennard; John McNutt; Marco Pirroni; Mick Proctor; Neil Pyzer; Luke Rendell; Art Smith; Alan St. Clair; Stan Stammers; Dolphin Taylor; Mark Gemini Thwaite; Graham Wilkinson; James Yardley; Mike Kelly
- Website: Kirk Brandon’s Website; Spear of Destiny on Myspace; Stan Stammers' Website

Spear of Destiny is a British rock band, formed in London in 1982 by lead vocalist, guitarist and principal songwriter Kirk Brandon and bassist Stan Stammers. It has had an ever-changing line-up through the years.

It has had 10 UK Singles Chart entries. Four reached the Top 50 but only one made the Top 20 – "Never Take Me Alive" (1987).

== History ==
Formed in 1982, the band's original line-up consisted of Kirk Brandon, Stan Stammers, Chris Bell and Lascelles James. In late 1983, this line-up was superseded by Dolphin Taylor on drums, Alan St. Clair on guitar, John Lennard on saxophone and Neil Pyzer on keyboards and additional saxophone. In 1984, John Lennard was replaced by Mickey Donnelly on saxophone.

Spear of Destiny recorded one session for John Peel (recorded 22 November 1982, transmitted on BBC Radio 1 on 29 November 1982).

"The band played a punk-influenced form of power rock, which often had an anthemic feel."

Their second studio album, One Eyed Jacks was released in 1984. It reached No. 22 in the UK Albums Chart Spear of Destiny’s reputation in the mid-1980s depended to a greater extent on their live performances.

In 1985, their third studio album, World Service reached the UK Top 20.

On 22 June 1985 they were one of five bands supporting U2 at the Longest Day concert at the Milton Keynes Bowl. The other acts were the Faith Brothers, Billy Bragg, the Ramones and R.E.M.

Founding member Stan Stammers left the band in 1986. In the wake of the release of the fourth studio album, Outland (1987) and its Top 15 hit "Never Take Me Alive", the band began achieving some chart success and staging sell-out concerts, including a support slot to U2 at Wembley Stadium. However, ill fortune struck on the eve of the band's appearance at the Reading Festival, as Brandon developed reactive arthritis which obliged the band to put all their plans on hold for nearly a year.

In addition to Brandon and Stammers, past members of the band in the 1980s included former Gillan drummer Pete Barnacle, former JoBoxers bassist Chris Bostock, former Adam and the Ants guitarist Marco Pirroni, former Tom Robinson Band and Stiff Little Fingers drummer Dolphin Taylor, and in the 1990s included guitarist Mark Gemini Thwaite of The Mission.

Brandon was also a member of the supergroup Dead Men Walking.

== Discography ==
- Grapes of Wrath (1983) – UK No. 62
- One Eyed Jacks (1984) – UK No. 22
- World Service (1985) – UK No. 11
- Outland (1987) – UK No. 16
- The Price You Pay (1988) – UK No. 37
- Sod's Law (1991)
- Religion (1997)
- Volunteers (2000)
- Morning Star (2003)
- Loadestone (2005)
- Imperial Prototype (2007)
- Omega Point (2010)
- 31 (2014)
- Tontine (2018)
- World Service @ 35 (2021) Re-recording of the 1985 album. Released as a limited edition 2x10" Gold vinyl LP (Eastersnow Recording Company)
- Ghost Population (2022)

== See also ==
- List of post-punk bands
- Theatre of Hate
- Kirk Brandon's 10:51
