= The Straps =

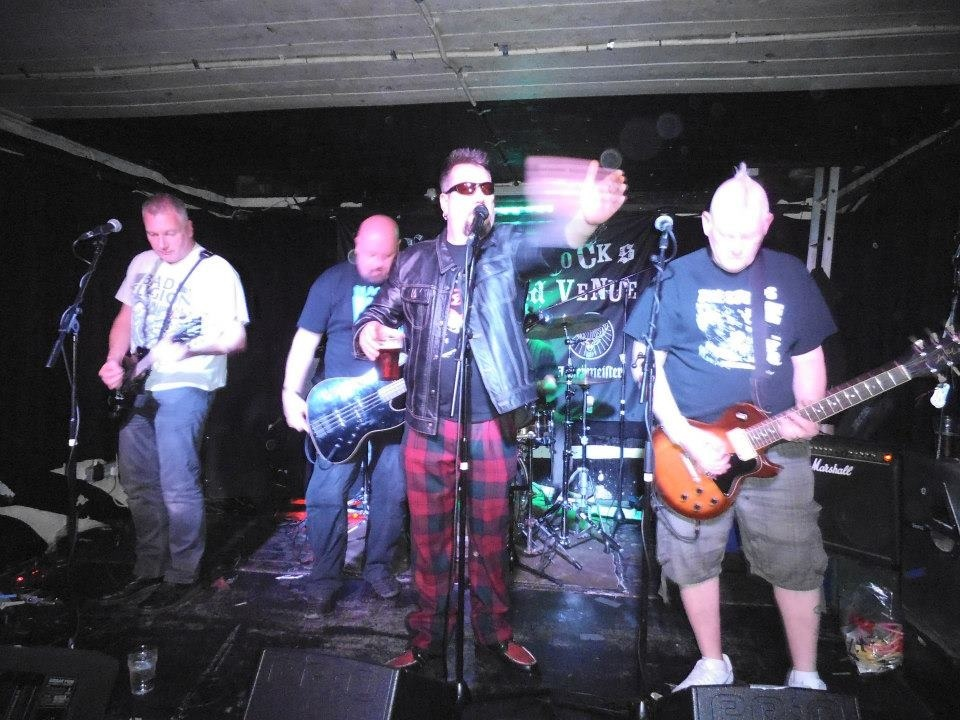
- The Straps in 2013

Background information
- Origin: Battersea, South London, United Kingdom
- Genres: Punk rock, streetpunk
- Years active: 1978–1983, 1993, 2005–2007, 2011-present
- Labels: Donut Records, Cyclops, Strapped for Cash Records, Flicknife Records
- Members: John Grant; Dave Reeves; Pete Davies; Phil McDermott, John Woodward, Bill Gaynor
- Past members: Green; Andi Sex Gang; Steve MacIntosh; Andy "Heed" Forbes; Stan Stammers; Luke Rendal; Cliff; Jim Walker; Jonathan Werner; Simon Werner; Pete Davies; Stuart Phillips; Mark Hobbs; Lloyd Dudley
- Website: Facebook page

The Straps are an English streetpunk band, formed in 1977 in Battersea, South London by vocalist Howard Jackson and guitarists Dave Reeves & Steve MacIntosh & Brad Day on drums

The band played their first gig at the Park Tavern in Streatham on 28 September 1978 with UK Subs, the Tickets and Security Risk & then went on to play more gigs around South London with the UK Subs & The Pack. Vocalist Howard Jackson was replaced by John Grant after Jackson failed to turn up to a band rehearsal at a squat in Battersea. John Grant was there along with Andi Sex Gang, and offered to help. Their original bassist, Green, died of a heroin overdose and was temporarily replaced by Andi Sex Gang for a show at the Latchmere Pub in Battersea.

Stan Stammers, a former Epileptics bassist, joined in 1979, and guitarist Steve MacIntosh was replaced by Andy "Heed" Forbes. Drummers in this period included Luke Rendal (previously of Crisis) and Cliff Warby. Stammers and Rendal left to form Theatre Of Hate in 1980 with Kirk Brandon, while Forbes left to join the Wall. Reeves & Grant then recruited Jim Walker, Simon & John Werner from The Pack to play a gig supporting the UK Subs at the Music Machine in Camden with just 48 hours notice.

The band line up for the recording of the Straps' debut single in 1980 for "Just Can't Take Anymore" (Donut Records) was Grant, Reeves and former members of the Pack: Jim Walker (also original drummer of Public Image Ltd.) and brothers Jonathan and Simon Werner. The same lineup recorded their second single, "Brixton," likewise released in 1982 on Walker's Donut label. The band's debut album was issued in 1982 on Simon Werners Cyclops label. The album featured UK Subs drummer Pete Davies (Walker only played on one track, departing for the Human Condition) and guest appearances by Andi Sex Gang, Captain Scarlet and the Damned's Rat Scabies. The Straps went on a UK tour with The Damned supported and funded by Charlie Dunnett and Dennis Boy Ramone.

The Straps enjoyed a cult following around London, selling out venues and also had monthly residencies at the 100 Club & Music Machine. The band also performed alongside the Damned on their 1980 Black Album tour, as well as Sham 69 and Stiff Little Fingers, before splitting in 1983.

Frontman Grant and Simon Werner later formed Bartok with Jah Wobble & Rat Scabies recording a 12" single, "Insanity" (1983). Grant went on to form Freakshow 1984, performing around the UK without any record releases.

The Straps reformed in 1991 for a one-off gig at the Brixton Academy with other original punk bands including Sham 69, UK Subs and the Lurkers. for the 'Fuck Reading' gig The Straps reformed in December 2004 after being asked to play at The Astoria 2 with The Rezillos & The Priscillas. In 2005, Captain Oi! Records) issued a Straps compilation, The Punk Collection, and the reunited band (including Grant, Reeves, Stuart Phillips on guitar, Mark Hobbs on bass and Lloyd Dudley on drums) in 2007 they released the limited-edition album In Love With the New World Order to coincide with that year's Rebellion Festival performance. The Straps played the Rebellion Festival three years running in 2005, 2006, 2007 until Grant suffered an accidental knee injury, and they separated again in 2008.

The band returned to the UK gig scene in 2012 for the ill-fated Last Jubilee and Punk by the Sea festivals, with a new lineup of Grant, Reeves, Pete Davies (UK Subs) and two new members: ex-Concrete Gods guitarist Phil McDermott and Morgellons & 16 Guns bassist Mark Geraghty. As well as playing a show in Southsea (Punk By The Sea) with Sham 69, UK Subs, Vice Squad and the Defects, this line up played the 100 Club with Chelsea and sold out a headline show at Camden's Barfly.

In August 2013, the band released their third studio album, Brave New Anger, recorded at Pat Collier's Perry Vale Studios.

The band are still gigging occasionally and playing at "Rebellion Festival" on a regular basis.

Current line up is: John Grant, Dave Reeves, Pete Davies, John Woodward (Angelic Upstarts) Phil McDermott (The Gonads), Bill Gaynor (The Glorias)

== Discography ==
=== Studio albums ===
- The Straps (1982, Cyclops)
- In Love With the New World Order (2005, Strapped for Cash Records)
- Brave New Anger (2013, Flicknife Records)

=== Singles ===
- "Just Can't Take Anymore" / "New Age" (1980, Donut Records)
- "Brixton" / "No Liquor" (1982, Donut Records)

=== Compilation albums ===
- The Punk Collection (2005, Captain Oi! Records)
