= Outland (Spear of Destiny album) =

Studio album by Spear of Destiny
- Released: 1987
- Genre: Rock
- Label: 10 Records
- Producer: Zeus B. Held except tracks 10 (Kirk Brandon), 11, 12, 13, 14 (Kirk Brandon, Steve Barnacle)

Spear of Destiny chronology
World Service (1985)	Outland (1987)	The Price You Pay (1988)

Outland is the fourth studio album by the British rock band Spear of Destiny, released by 10 Records in 1987. Outland spent 13 weeks on the UK album charts, peaking at number 16 in May 1987.

It included the hit single "Never Take Me Alive" which reached No. 14 on the UK Singles Chart in 1987 - Spear of Destiny's only Top 20 hit in the UK. Three other singles were released from the album, namely "Strangers in Our Town", "Was That You?" and "The Traveller", all making the UK Top 50.

== Track listing ==
All songs written by Kirk Brandon.

Side one

1. "Outlands" - 5:19
2. "Land of Shame" - 3:19
3. "The Traveller" - 4:49
4. "Was That You?" - 3:58

Side two

1. "Strangers in Our Town" - 3:55
2. "The Whole World's Waiting" - 4:57
3. "Tonight" - 4:31
4. "Miami Vice" - 4:57
5. "Never Take Me Alive" - 4:15

CD bonus tracks

10. "Time of Our Lives" (Original version) - 4:27
11. "Pumpkin Man" - 5:10
12. "Embassy Song" - 4:18
13. "The Man That Never Was" - 3:18
14. "Jack Straw" - 4:26

== Personnel ==
Spear of Destiny

- Kirk Brandon - vocals, guitar
- Pete Barnacle - drums
- Steve Barnacle - bass guitar, fretless bass, keyboards
- Marco Pirroni - guitar, 12-string guitar
- Volker Janssen - keyboards
- Mick Proctor - guitar

Technical

- Neill King - engineer, mixer
- Chris Welch - cover illustration
