= In Requiem =

- Cover art by Seth Siro Anton

Studio album by Paradise Lost
- Released: 21 May 2007 (UK)
- Recorded: 2006–2007
- Studio: The Chapel Studios (London); Strait Sound Studios (Gibson, Vancouver)
- Genre: Gothic metal; doom metal
- Length: 45:08
- Label: Century Media
- Producer: Rhys Fulber

Paradise Lost chronology
Paradise Lost (2005)	In Requiem (2007)	The Anatomy of Melancholy (2008)

Professional ratings
Review scores
Source	Rating
AllMusic	3/5 stars

In Requiem is the eleventh studio album by British gothic metal band Paradise Lost, released on 21 May 2007 through Century Media Records. It was produced by Rhys Fulber. Greek artist Seth Siro Anton from the metal band Septicflesh created the album's artwork.

The song "Sedative God" was originally intended for the previous Paradise Lost album, but was not recorded in time. Drummer Jeff Singer, who played on the aforementioned album, was not an official member of the band back then until the first single of this album The Enemy, although he left Paradise Lost one year after this album's release.

The album features harsh vocals by Nick Holmes, similar to the style he had on Icon.

The title for song "Praise Lamented Shade" comes after An Essay on Criticism by Alexander Pope.

== Track listing ==
All tracks by Nick Holmes and Greg MacKintosh.

No.	Title	Length
1.	"Never for the Damned"	5:02
2.	"Ash & Debris"	4:16
3.	"The Enemy"	3:39
4.	"Praise Lamented Shade"	4:02
5.	"Requiem"	4:25
6.	"Unreachable"	3:38
7.	"Prelude to Descent"	4:11
8.	"Fallen Children"	3:38
9.	"Beneath Black Skies"	4:12
10.	"Sedative God"	3:59
11.	"Your Own Reality"	4:02

Limited edition
No.	Title	Length
12.	"Silent in Heart"	3:22
13.	"Godless"	2:16
14.	"Missing" (Everything but the Girl cover)	4:21

Japan edition
No.	Title	Length
12.	"Missing" (Everything but the Girl cover)	4:32
13.	"Silent in Heart"	3:24
14.	"Sons of Perdition"	4:13

== Credits ==
- Nick Holmes – vocals
- Gregor Mackintosh – lead guitar
- Aaron Aedy – rhythm guitar
- Steve Edmondson – bass
- Jeff Singer – drums

=== Additional personnel ===
- Leah Randi - additional vocals on "The Enemy" and "Praise Lamented Shade"
- Heather Thompson - additional vocals on "The Enemy"
- Mike Fraser - mix
- Ue Nastasi - mastering

== Charts ==
Weekly chart performance for In Requiem
Chart (2007)	Peak position
Austrian Albums (Ö3 Austria)	28
Belgian Albums (Ultratop Wallonia)	95
Finnish Albums (Suomen virallinen lista)	19
French Albums (SNEP)	43
German Albums (Offizielle Top 100)	12
Italian Albums (FIMI)	90
Japanese Albums (Oricon)	236
Swedish Albums (Sverigetopplistan)	33
Swiss Albums (Schweizer Hitparade)	41
UK Albums (OCC)	125
