= Adrian Portas =

English musician, singer and songwriter

Adrian Portas is an English musician, singer and songwriter. Portas plays several instruments including guitar, keyboards, and drums.

He has been a member of the bands Dollface, New Model Army, and Sex Gang Children. Portas wrote all of the songs for Dollface's 1995 album, Giant.

He is currently active as a guitarist in Spear of Destiny.
