= Stan Stammers =

- Stan Stammers performing.

Background information
- Born: Andrew Stammers; 19 May 1961 (age 65)
- Origin: Saffron Walden, Essex, England
- Genres: Punk rock, post-punk
- Occupations: Bassist, vocalist, songwriter, producer
- Instrument: Bass guitar
- Years active: 1978–present
- Labels: CBS Records; Chainsaw Records; ABC Records; Anagram Records; Wasabi Music Entertainment; 45 Records; Plastic Eater Sound
- Website: stanstammers.com

Stan Stammers (born 19 May 1961, England) is an English musician best known as the bass player for the bands Theatre of Hate, Spear of Destiny and Plastic Eaters.

== Early life ==
Stammers grew up in Saffron Walden, Essex. He got into punk music by going to see live bands at Cambridge Corn Exchange and other nearby venues. Stammers' first band was 'The Jump', based in Newport, a village close to Saffron Walden and from an early age his main influence for playing bass was Slade's bass player Jimmy Lea, who he cites as an influence today, along with Paul Simonon (The Clash), Bruce Foxton (The Jam) and Horace Panter (The Specials).

== Musical career ==
Before joining Theatre of Hate Stan played for punk band the Epileptics and later The Straps, a band that featured Jim Walker (drummer) from Public Image Ltd..
