= Kirk Brandon =

English musician (born 1956)

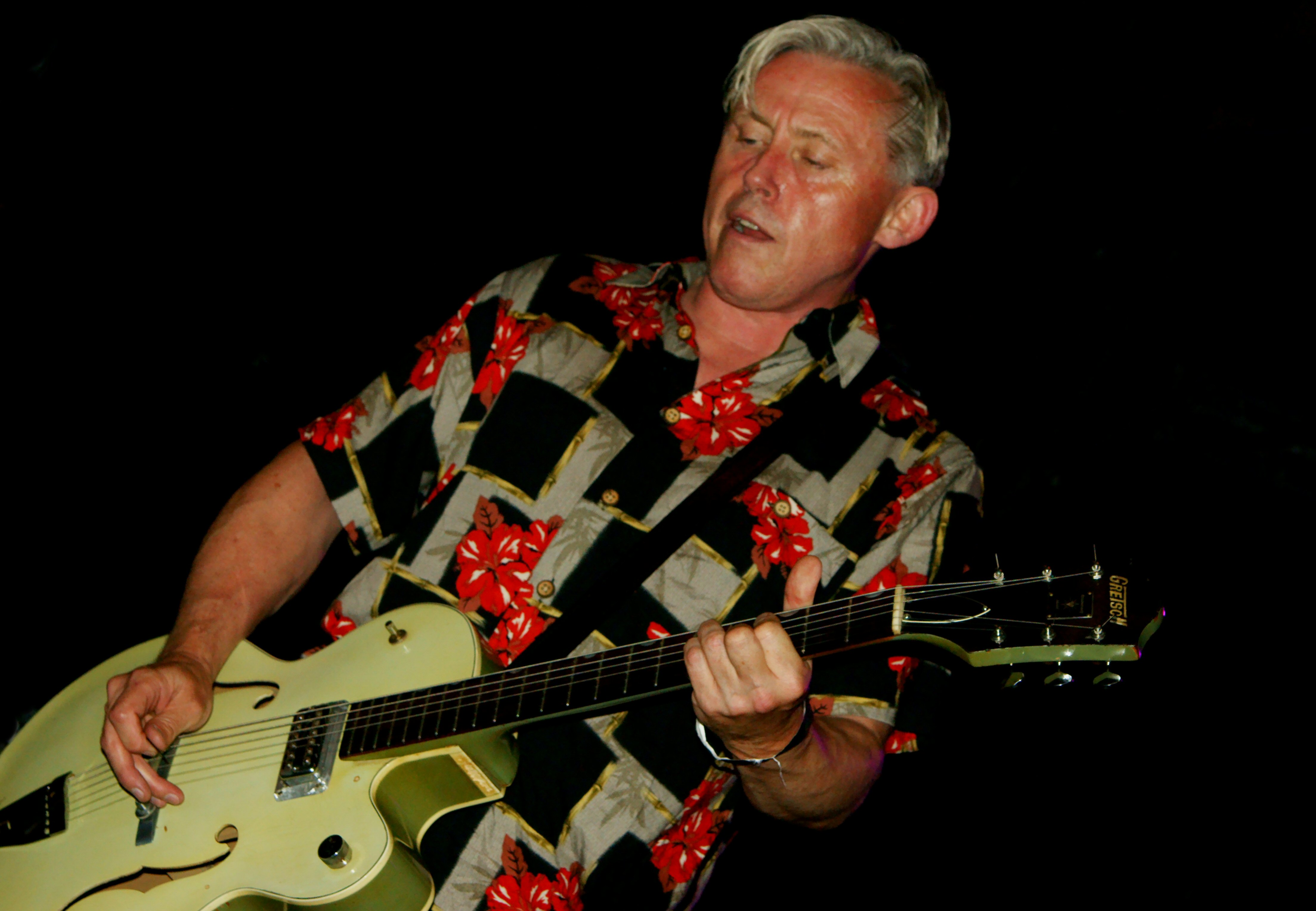
- Brandon performing live in London, 2012

Background information
- Born: 3 August 1956 (age 70); Westminster, London, England
- Genres: Punk; post-punk
- Occupations: Singer-songwriter; musician
- Instruments: Vocals; guitar
- Years active: 1978–present
- Labels: S.S.; Burning Rome; Epic; Virgin; Eastworld; Do-Little
- Member of: Theatre of Hate; Spear of Destiny; Dead Men Walking
- Website: kirkbrandon.com

Kirk Brandon (born 3 August 1956) is an English musician best known as the leader of the bands Theatre of Hate and Spear of Destiny.

== Musical career ==
Brandon's music career started in 1978, in Clapham, south London, with the formation of punk group The Pack, in which he was the singer and songwriter.

The Pack consisted of Brandon, Scottish-born drummer Rab Fae Beith and two Canadian brothers, Simon and Jon Werner on guitars. The last live gig by The Pack took place at the 101 club in Clapham.

Brandon then formed the post punk new wave band Theatre of Hate in 1980 recruiting Stan Stammers, previously of The Straps, on bass guitar, Nigel Preston on drums, Billy Duffy on guitar and John 'Boy' Lennard on saxophone. Theatre of Hate had their largest hit from the Westworld album with the single "Do You Believe in the Westworld?", which achieved number 40 in the UK Singles Chart in January 1982, while the album rose to number 17 in the UK Albums Chart in March 1982.

Theatre of Hate disbanded in 1983. Brandon and Stammers were then joined by Lascelles James of Brit funk band Body, Soul & Spirit on saxophone and Chris Bell on drums to form Spear of Destiny. The new band adopted a more melodic and less aggressive sound, distancing themselves from post-punk and moving a little more towards mainstream pop.

While continuing to explore the political ideas that he wrote about in Theatre of Hate, Brandon's lyrics for Spear of Destiny dealt more frequently with the classic pop themes of love and romance. Many line-up changes followed with the band swelling to a 6-piece and then contracting back to a 4-piece. The band's reputation as a live act never translated itself into record sales, and Spear of Destiny only had one Top 20 hit, "Never Take Me Alive", which reached number 14 in the UK Singles Chart in 1987.

In 2003, Brandon did a solo tour as support to The Alarm on their 'Poppyfields' tour. His set included some new material played on an acoustic guitar with electric pick up, as well as some material from his time with Theatre of Hate and Spear of Destiny.

In later years he performed in the punk supergroup, Dead Men Walking, before reforming and touring with Spear of Destiny in 2007 and 2008. Brandon continues to tour with both Spear of Destiny and Theatre of Hate, as well as a revamped Dead Men Walking and playing occasionally as The Pack.

== Personal life ==
As a boy, Brandon attended Churston Ferrers Grammar School in Devon.

In 1987, Brandon developed reactive arthritis and could not walk for more than a year.

Brandon was married in 1994 to a Danish woman, Christina. Shortly afterwards, he was declared bankrupt.

In 1997, Brandon sued the singer Boy George for malicious falsehood. In his 1995 autobiography Take It Like a Man, George stated that he had had a homosexual relationship with Brandon years earlier. Brandon denied that he had had sex with George and stated that stories about their alleged relationship had damaged his career as a musician. He also objected to the lyrics of a Boy George song, "Unfinished Business", which apparently were aimed at him: "I hear you married a Danish girl ... You break your promise easily ... You lie, you lie, you lie. Yeah tough guy, you know exactly what I mean." Brandon demanded damages from Boy George, George's publishers, Sidgwick and Jackson, and also from Virgin Records and EMI Virgin Music Publishing. In April 1997, Mr Justice Douglas Brown ruled in favor of George, adding that he did not believe Brandon when Brandon denied having had a physical relationship with George. The judge ordered Brandon to pay £200,000 to Virgin Records, EMI Virgin Music, and the book publisher in court costs. Following the lawsuit, Brandon declared bankruptcy, which resulted in Boy George paying over £20,000 in legal fees instead.

In January 2008, Brandon sued GlaxoSmithKline UK over personal injuries as a result of taking the anti-depressant drug Seroxat.

Brandon had heart surgery in 2011.

He was a tutor at the BIMM University in 2012.

== Media portrayal ==
Brandon was portrayed by Richard Madden in the 2010 television film Worried About the Boy, a dramatisation of Boy George's rise to fame in the early 1980s.
