= List of songs recorded by Chuck Mosley =

Songs recorded by Chuck Mosley
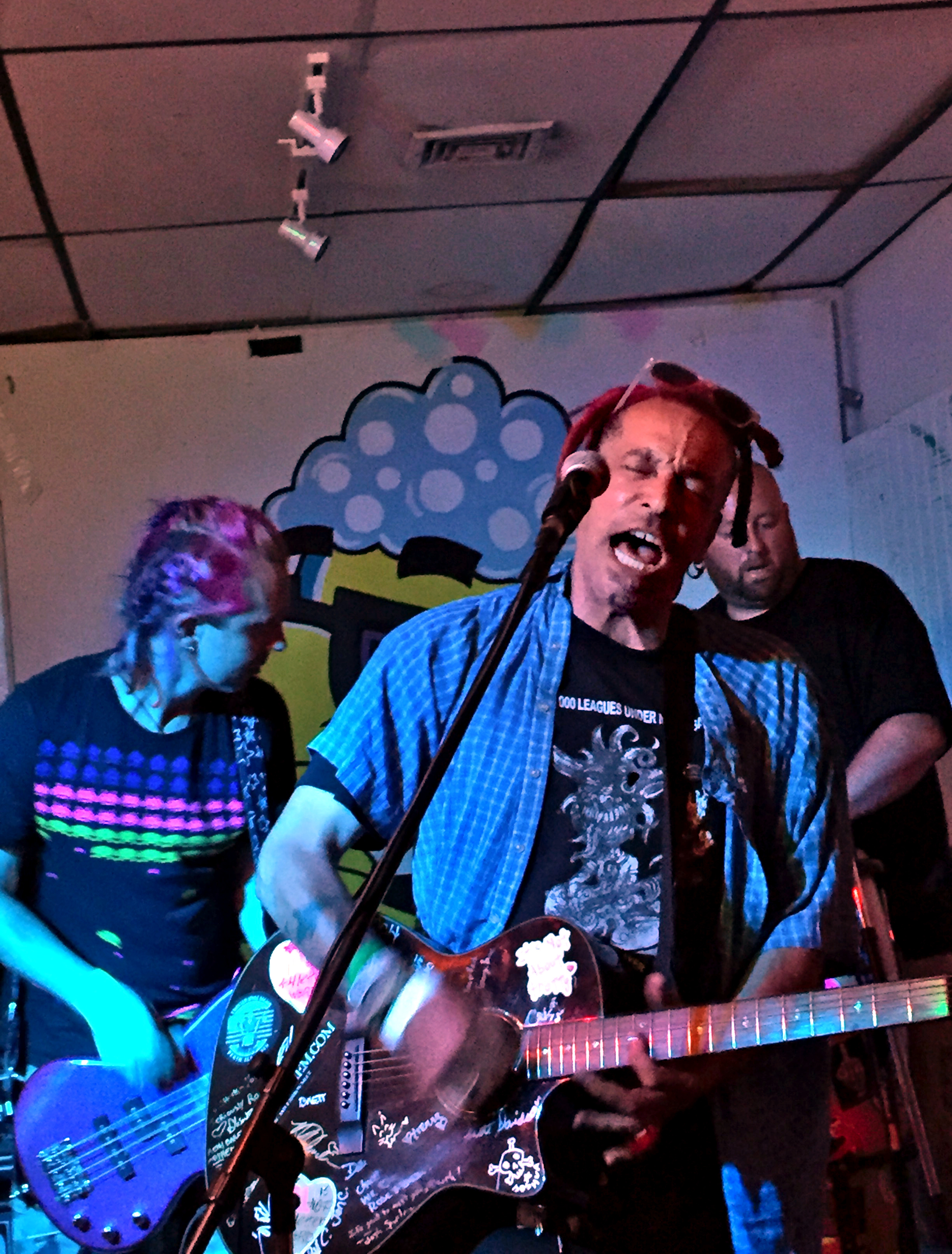
Breakdown by artist
Artist	No. songs
Chuck Mosley	30
Cement	26
Primitive Race	21
Faith No More	20
Indoria	8

Chuck Mosley, born Charles Henry Mosley III (December 26, 1959 – November 9, 2017), was an American musician, singer and songwriter. During his career, he recorded over 100 songs, both as a solo artist and as a member of Faith No More, Cement, and Primitive Race.

Mosley began his career in Los Angeles, performing in local bands The Animated and Haircuts That Kill, before joining Faith No More in 1983. He appeared on two albums with the group, We Care a Lot (1985) and follow-up Introduce Yourself (1987), before being fired for "erratic behaviour" the following year. Mosley's last recording for the band was "New Improved Song", released as a covermount for Sounds magazine that same year; the song was later reworked as "The Morning After" for the band's next album The Real Thing.

After Faith No More, Mosley briefly joined the group Bad Brains, before moving on to form Cement. The latter group released two albums—Cement and The Man with the Action Hair—before a bus accident, which left Mosley with a broken back, curtailed their career. Following this, Mosley left the music industry for several years before returning in 2009 with his solo debut, Will Rap Over Hard Rock for Food. Mosley joined the musical supergroup Primitive Race for their album Soul Pretender, which was released a week before his death; the material on this album was later reworked for the posthumous remix album Cranial Matter. Towards the end of his life, Mosley focussed on acoustic performances, some of which saw release as the 2019 Record Store Day exclusive Joe Haze Sessions#2. According to a statement released by his family, Mosley died "due to the disease of addiction" on November 9, 2017, at age 57.

Mosley is known for his distinctive vocal style—described as "an acquired taste to most"—which blended elements of rap music, punk, and metal, and which has been seen as an influence on popular music of the 1990s. Mosley credited the development of this style to his initial confusion with Faith No More's music, stating, "I hadn't heard anything like it before […] that's where the rapping stuff came from. I couldn't really understand the music. It was complicated and different to me, so I was just screaming to the beat, like ranting".

== Songs ==
The thing I hear most often is: 'Did you ever think of going into stand up?' I learned early on the devastating effect of the in-between song silence with the band trying to talk among themselves and tune up. So I always tried to fill it up by just saying really stupid stuff.

–Mosley on his stage presence

Over the hills, they came from the valley
Making innuendoes about my lack of talent, oh well…
They say that when I'm supposed to be singing
All I'm really doing is yelling

–Mosley's lyrics for "Greed", inspired by early criticism
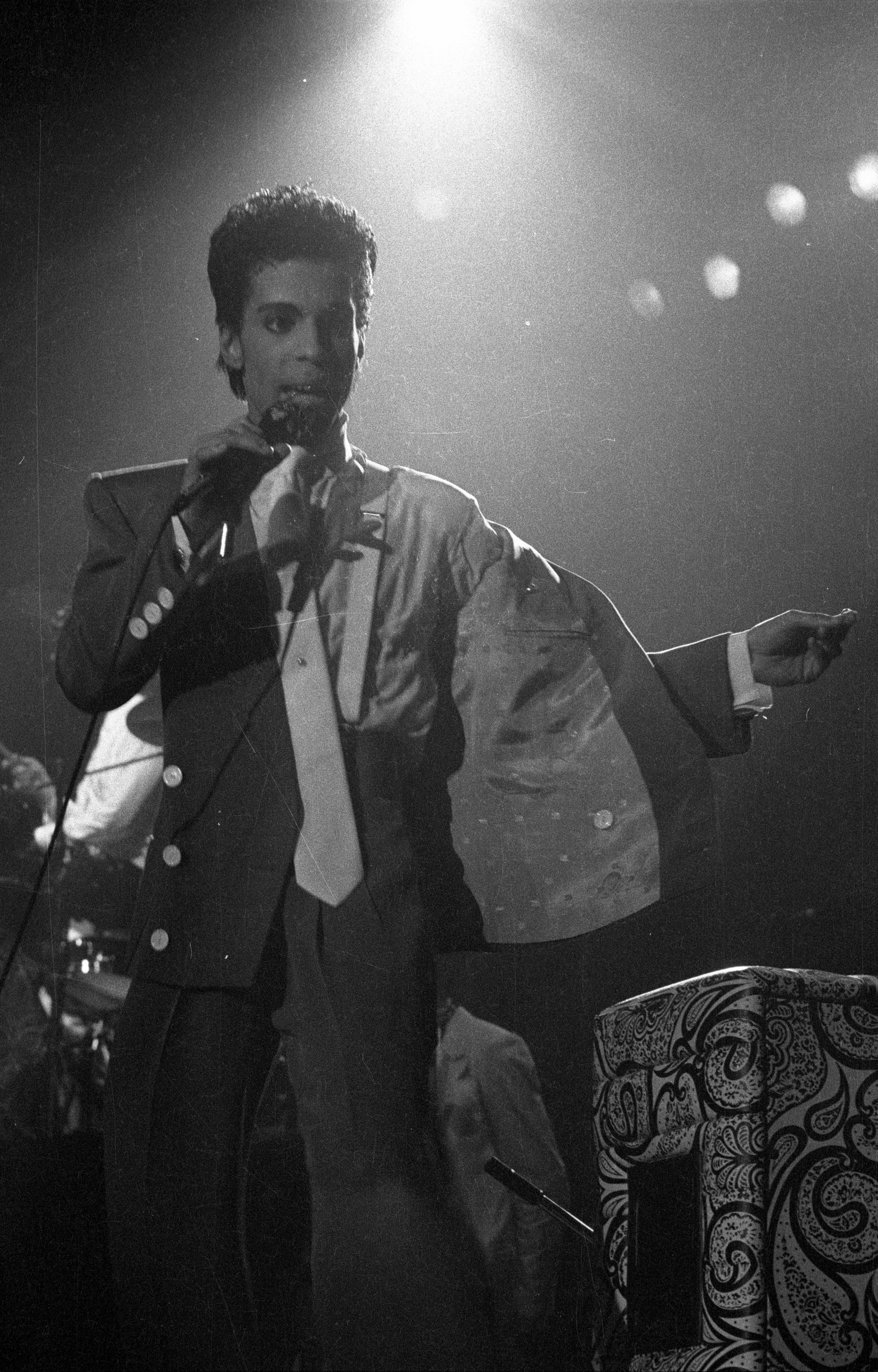
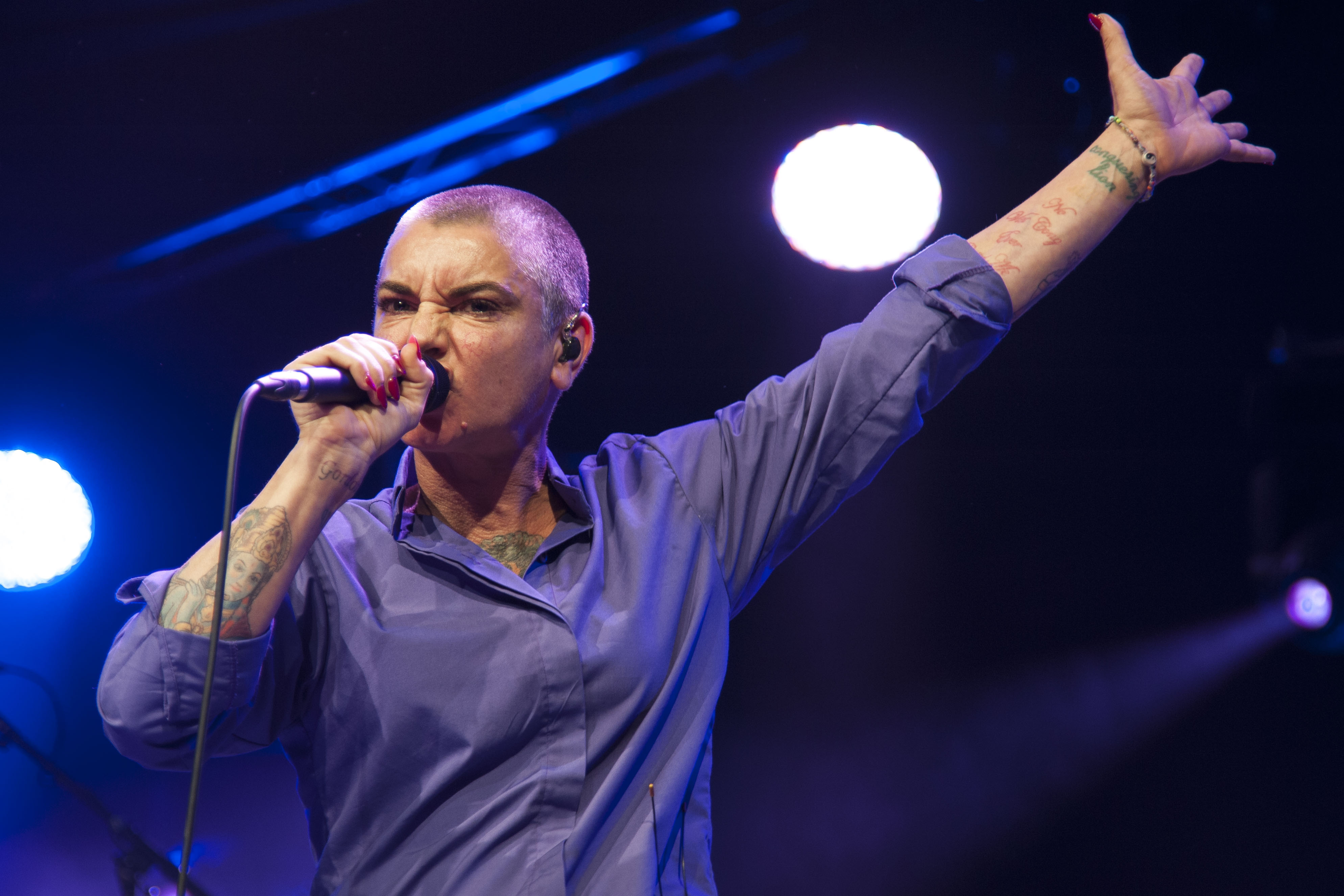
Mosley posthumously released a cover of "Nothing Compares 2 U", written by Prince and previously recorded by Sinéad O'Connor.

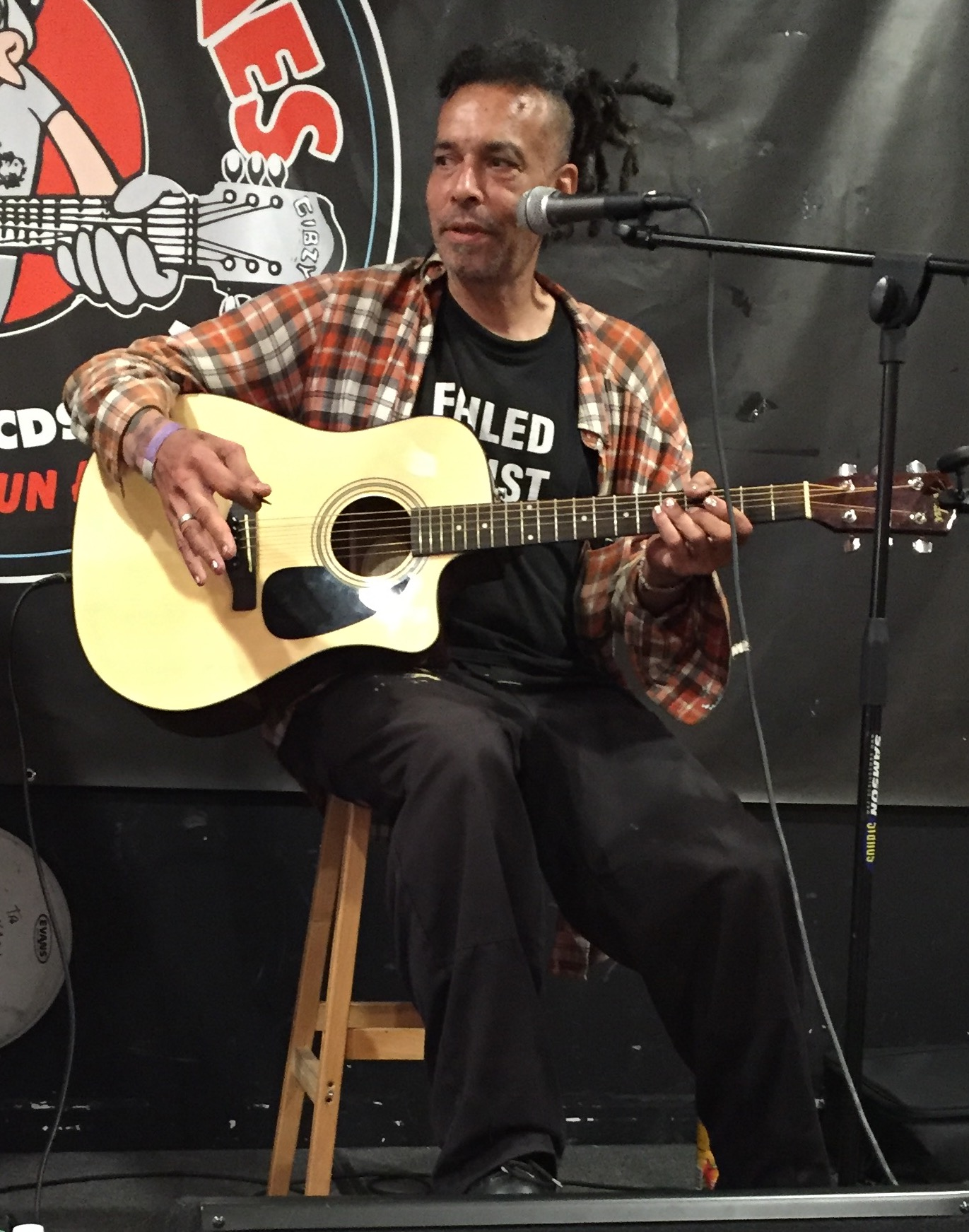
Mosley's late career (pictured in 2016) saw a focus on acoustic music.

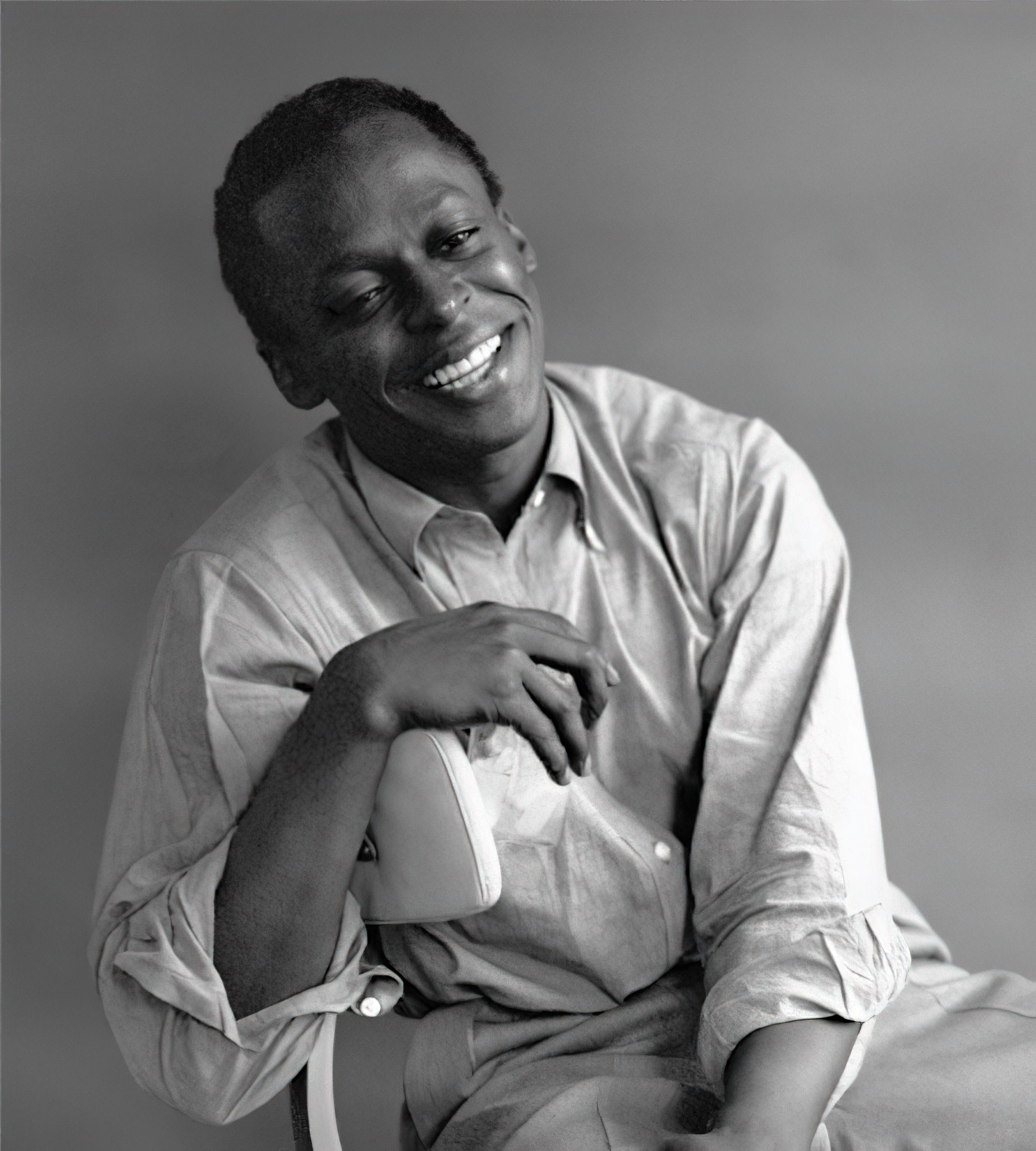
Cement's first album featured a cover of "Four", a composition by Miles Davis.

Key
†	Indicates single release

Songs recorded by Chuck Mosley
Song	Artist	Credit as writer(s)	Release	Year	Ref(s)
"Anne's Song" †	Faith No More	Gould; Bottum	Introduce Yourself	1987	
"Arabian Disco"	Faith No More	Mosley; Gould	We Care a Lot	1985	
"As the Worm Turns"	Faith No More	Mosley; Bottum; Gould	We Care a Lot	1985	
"Bed Six"	Primitive Race	Kniker; Loch; Mosley; Thwaite	Soul Pretender	2017	
"Bed Six (Dave Ogilvie Mix)"	Primitive Race	Kniker; Loch; Mosley; Thwaite	Cranial Matter	2019	
"Bed Six (Rodney Anonymous Mix)"	Primitive Race	Kniker; Loch; Mosley; Thwaite	Cranial Matter	2019	
"Bella Donna (The Indoria Mix)"	Indoria	Indoria	You'll Never Make the Six	2016	
"Bella Donna (Live in London)"	Chuck Mosley	Indoria	First Hellos and Last Goodbyes	2020	
"Blood"	Faith No More	Mosley	Introduce Yourself	1987	
"Blue"	Cement	Cement	Cement	1993	
"Blue Heart (Live in Knoxville)"	Chuck Mosley	Mosley	First Hellos and Last Goodbyes	2020	
"Bob Forest"	Chuck Mosley	Mosley	Will Rap Over Hard Rock for Food	2009	
"Bob Forest (Live in London)"	Chuck Mosley	Mosley	First Hellos and Last Goodbyes	2020	
"Bob Forest (The Only Mix)"	Chuck Mosley	Mosley	Demos for Sale	2016	
"Bonnie Brea"	Cement	Cement	The Man with the Action Hair	1994	
"Chinese Arithmetic"	Faith No More	Mosley; Bordin; Martin	Introduce Yourself	1987	
"Chip Away"	Cement	Cement	Cement	1993	
"Come Around"	Chuck Mosley	Mosley	Will Rap Over Hard Rock for Food	2009	
"Come Around (Demo)"	Chuck Mosley	Mosley	Demos for Sale	2016	
"Come Around (Live in Huntsville)"	Chuck Mosley	Mosley	First Hellos and Last Goodbyes	2020	
"The Crab Song"	Faith No More	Mosley; Gould; Bordin	Introduce Yourself	1987	
"Cranial Matter"	Primitive Race	Kniker; Loch; Mosley; Thwaite	Soul Pretender	2017	
"Cranial Matter (Toshi Kasai Mix)"	Primitive Race	Kniker; Loch; Mosley; Thwaite	Cranial Matter	2019	
"Cry Out"	Primitive Race	Kniker; Loch; Mosley; Thwaite	Soul Pretender	2017	
"Cry Out (Angelspit Mix)"	Primitive Race	Kniker; Loch; Mosley; Thwaite	Cranial Matter	2019	
"Crying"	Cement	Cement	The Man with the Action Hair	1994	
"Dancing from the Depths of the Fire"	Cement	Cement	The Man with the Action Hair	1994	
"Dancing on the Sun"	Primitive Race	Kniker; Loch; Mosley; Thwaite	Soul Pretender	2017	
"Dancing on the Sun (Bumblebee Mix)"	Primitive Race	Kniker; Loch; Mosley; Thwaite	Cranial Matter	2019	
"Death March"	Faith No More	Mosley; Gould; Bottum; Martin	Introduce Yourself	1987	
"The Enabler"	Chuck Mosley	Mosley	Will Rap Over Hard Rock for Food	2009	
"The Enabler (Hold the Korn Mix)"	Chuck Mosley	Mosley	Demos for Sale	2016	
"Fade"	Indoria	Indoria	You'll Never Make the Six	2016	
"Faster Disco"	Faith No More	Mosley; Gould; Bottum; Martin	Introduce Yourself	1987	
"Four"	Cement	Davis	Cement	1993	
"Greed"	Faith No More	Gould; Mosley	We Care a Lot	1985	
"Hotel Diablo"	Cement	Cement	The Man with the Action Hair	1994	
"I Feel"	Cement	Cement	Cement	1993	
"Incomplete"	Indoria	Indoria	You'll Never Make the Six	2016	
"Intro"	Chuck Mosley	Mosley	Will Rap Over Hard Rock for Food	2009	
"Introduce Yourself"	Faith No More	Mosley; Gould; Bottum; Bordin; Martin	Introduce Yourself	1987	
"Jim"	Faith No More	Martin	We Care a Lot	1985	
"The Jungle"	Faith No More	Mosley; Bottum; Gould; Bordin	We Care a Lot	1985	
"KCMT"	Cement	Cement	Cement	1993	
"Killing an Angel"	Cement	Cement	The Man with the Action Hair	1994	
"King Arthur"	Cement	Cement	The Man with the Action Hair	1994	
"King Arthur's Cousin Ted"	Chuck Mosley	Mosley	Will Rap Over Hard Rock for Food	2009	
"King Arthur's Cousin Ted (Ultra Extended Version)"	Chuck Mosley	Mosley	Demos for Sale	2016	
"Life on the Sun"	Cement	Cement	The Man with the Action Hair	1994	
"Living Sound Delay"	Cement	Cement	Cement	1993	
"Magic Number"	Cement	Cement	The Man with the Action Hair	1994	
"The Man with the Action Hair"	Cement	Cement	The Man with the Action Hair	1994	
"Mark Bowen"	Faith No More	Mosley; Gould; Bordin	We Care a Lot	1985	
"Nameless"	Chuck Mosley	Mosley	Will Rap Over Hard Rock for Food	2009	
"Nameless (Live in Manchester)"	Chuck Mosley	Mosley	First Hellos and Last Goodbyes	2020	
"New Beginnings"	Faith No More	Mosley	We Care a Lot	1985	
"New Improved Song"	Faith No More	Faith No More	Sounds Waves 2	1988	(Note: Included on covermount by Sounds)
"Nothing Compares 2 U"	Chuck Mosley	Prince	Joe Haze Sessions #2	2019	
"Nothing to Behold"	Primitive Race	Kniker; Loch; Mosley; Thwaite	Soul Pretender	2017	
"Nothing to Behold (Ego Likeness Mix)"	Primitive Race	Kniker; Loch; Mosley; Thwaite	Cranial Matter	2019	
"Ode from the Road"	Indoria	Indoria	You'll Never Make the Six	2016	
"Old Days"	Cement	Pankow	Cement	1993	
"Only in My Head"	Indoria	Indoria	You'll Never Make the Six	2016	
"Pile Driver"	Cement	Cement	The Man with the Action Hair	1994	
"Pile Driver"	Chuck Mosley	Mosley; Williams	Will Rap Over Hard Rock for Food	2009	
"Power and the Magic"	Cement	Cement	The Man with the Action Hair	1994	
"Prison Love"	Cement	Cement	Cement	1993	
"Punk Rock Movie"	Chuck Mosley	Mosley	Will Rap Over Hard Rock for Food	2009	
"Punk Rock Movie (Lights, Camera, Action Mix)"	Chuck Mosley	Mosley	Demos for Sale	2016	
"Reason to Live"	Indoria	Indoria	You'll Never Make the Six	2016	
"Reputation Shot"	Cement	Cement	Cement	1993	
"Rn'R"	Faith No More	Mosley; Gould; Martin	Introduce Yourself	1987	
"Row House"	Primitive Race	Kniker; Loch; Mosley; Thwaite	Soul Pretender	2017	
"Say the Words"	Indoria	Indoria	You'll Never Make the Six	2016	
"Shout"	Cement	Cement	Cement	1993	
"Six"	Cement	Cement	Cement	1993	
"Sleep"	Cement	Cement	The Man with the Action Hair	1994	
"Song #2 (Live in Huntsville)"	Chuck Mosley	Mosley	First Hellos and Last Goodbyes	2020	
"Sophie"	Chuck Mosley	Mosley	Will Rap Over Hard Rock for Food	2009	
"Sophie (Live in Manchester)"	Chuck Mosley	Mosley	First Hellos and Last Goodbyes	2020	
"Sophie (Where's My Acoustic Mix)"	Chuck Mosley	Mosley	Demos for Sale	2016	
"Soul Pretender"	Primitive Race	Kniker; Loch; Mosley; Thwaite	Soul Pretender	2017	
"Soul Pretender (Paul Leary Mix)"	Primitive Race	Kniker; Loch; Mosley; Thwaite	Cranial Matter	2019	
"Spirit"	Faith No More	Gould	Introduce Yourself	1987	
"Stepping Stone"	Primitive Race	Kniker; Loch; Mosley; Thwaite	Soul Pretender	2017	
"Take It All"	Primitive Race	Kniker; Loch; Mosley; Thwaite	Soul Pretender	2017	
"Take It All (Kevin Rutmanis Mix)"	Primitive Race	Kniker; Loch; Mosley; Thwaite	Cranial Matter	2019	
"Take It All (Skatenigs Mix)"	Primitive Race	Kniker; Loch; Mosley; Thwaite	Cranial Matter	2019	
"Take It Easy"	Cement	Cement	Cement	1993	
"Take This Bottle"	Chuck Mosley	Faith No More	Joe Haze Sessions #2	2019	
"Too Beat"	Cement	Cement	Cement	1993	
"Tractor"	Chuck Mosley	Mosley	Will Rap Over Hard Rock for Food	2009	
"Tractor (Demo)"	Chuck Mosley	Mosley	Demos for Sale	2016	
"Tractor (Doug's Unapproved Radio Edit)"	Chuck Mosley	Mosley	Demos for Sale	2016	
"Tractor (Live in London)"	Chuck Mosley	Mosley	First Hellos and Last Goodbyes	2020	
"Train"	Cement	Cement	The Man with the Action Hair	1994	
"Turn It Up"	Primitive Race	Kniker; Loch; Mosley; Thwaite	Soul Pretender	2017	
"Turn It Up (Dave Lombardo Mix)"	Primitive Race	Kniker; Loch; Mosley; Thwaite	Cranial Matter	2019	
"WCAL (I've Got Two Rules Mix)"	Chuck Mosley	Mosley; Gould; Bordin; Bottum; Martin	Demos for Sale	2016	
"We Care a Lot"	Faith No More	Mosley; Bottum	We Care a Lot	1985	
"We Care a Lot" (Slash Version) †	Faith No More	Mosley; Gould; Bottum	Introduce Yourself	1987	
"We Care a Lot"	Chuck Mosley	Mosley; Gould; Bordin; Bottum; Martin	Will Rap Over Hard Rock for Food	2009	
"What I Feel"	Indoria	Indoria	You'll Never Make the Six	2016	
"Why Do You Bother"	Faith No More	Gould; Bordin; Bottum	We Care a Lot	1985	
"Your Heart in Real Time"	Primitive Race	Kniker; Loch; Mosley; Thwaite	Cranial Matter	2019	
