= Primitive Race (album) =

Studio album by Primitive Race
- Released: August 7, 2015
- Genre: Industrial rock
- Label: Metropolis

Primitive Race chronology
| Long in the Tooth (EP) (2015) | Primitive Race (2015) |

Primitive Race is the first full-length album by industrial supergroup Primitive Race. Created by Chris Kniker, the project has regular appearances by Graham Crabb, Erie Loch, and Mark Gemini Thwaite. A few more additional contributors include Tommy Victor, Dave “Rave” Ogilvie, Kourtney Klein, Mark “3KSK” Brooks, Josh Bradford, Andi Sex Gang.

== Track listing ==
| No. | Title | Length |
|---|---|---|
| 1. | "So Strange" | 4:14 |
| 2. | "Follow The Leader" | 3:27 |
| 3. | "Acceptance of Reality" | 4:03 |
| 4. | "Addict Now" | 4:07 |
| 5. | "Cage Rattler" | 3:03 |
| 6. | "Give Up The Ghost" | 4:05 |
| 7. | "Taking Things Back" | 5:01 |
| 8. | "Platinum Balls" | 3:44 |
| 9. | "Seeing Right Through It All" | 5:00 |
| 10. | "DJFH" | 3:01 |
| 11. | "Below Zero" | 5:33 |
| Total length: | | 45:18 |

== Personnel ==
- Chris Kniker - Bass, Programmed By, Noises
- Mark Brooks - Guitar, Synth, Programmed By
- Mark Gemini Thwaite - Guitar, Synth, Programmed By, Bass
- Erie Loch - Guitar, Synth, Programmed By, Bass, Vocals
- Kourtney Klein - Synthesizer, Programmed By
- Dave Ogilvie - Synthesizer, Programmed By, Noises
- Josh Bradford - Vocals
- Tommy Victor - Vocals
- Graham Crabb - Vocals, Synth, Programmed By
