= Long in the Tooth =

Long in the Tooth may refer to:

- Horse teeth
- Long in the Tooth (Billy Joe Shaver album), 2014
- Long in the Tooth (Primitive Race EP), 2015
- "Long in the Tooth" (Justified), a 2010 episode of the TV series Justified
