= Boom! (TV series) =

American reality television series

Boom! is an American reality television series that aired on Spike TV in 2005 and was hosted by Kourtney Klein. It featured a group of demolition experts using explosives to destroy objects such as trailers, houses, boats and cars. Often, the suggestions on what should be blown up were sent in by home viewers via a "BOOM! Mailbag". Each episode covered obtaining the materials (such as the item to be destroyed), cleaning, gutting, and rigging the thing with explosives, and then making the final countdown and pushing the detonator, and watching the devastation.
