= New Disease (band) =

New Disease are a British-based rock band formed in 2002 by The Mission guitarist Mark Thwaite, vocalist Jacob Lee Bane, Daisy Chainsaw and Queen Adreena bassist Richard Adams and The Wildhearts drummer Ritch Battersby.

The band released the Axiomatic EP in 2003, co-produced by John Fryer, and the band received favourable reviews in the British rock press including Kerrang! magazine, Metal Hammer and Rock Sound magazine. This drew the attention of Tool and Godsmack producer David Bottrill, who negotiated a deal for the band with Universal Records USA and his label imprint "Mainstation Music" in 2004. During this time drummer Ritch Battersby departed the band and was replaced with former One Minute Silence drummer Eddie Stratton.

After signing to Universal records and releasing the single Like Rain (#97 UK) produced by Canadian producer David Bottrill, the band were later dropped by Universal during a restructure, and Thwaite relocated to the USA in 2005 and joined Peter Murphy's band, and rejoined his old band The Mission later that year. New Disease never officially disbanded but all plans to release the band's debut album were placed on indefinite hiatus.

In June 2014 the band announced on their website and Facebook page that after a hiatus of nearly 10 years, founder members Mark Gemini Thwaite and Jacob Lee Bane had written new material and decided to release the long-awaited and to date unreleased New Disease album on CD and digital download.

Patent Life was mastered by Maor Appelbaum and is released via worldwide independent distributors CDBaby in North America on 11 August 2014. Recorded between 2003 and 2004 during sessions with producer David Bottrill (Tool/Muse/Peter Gabriel) and John Fryer, the 15-track album includes some of the band's self-recorded sessions, a brand new re-recorded version of the 2014 single "Like Rain" and an exclusive new 2014 song "Plain field".

In February 2015 UK label Armalyte Industries released a special edition of the album called Patent Life Deluxe in CD and digital format complete with a bonus disc full of rarities, demos and unreleased tracks, and new sleeve art. The special 2xCD release included 11 bonus tracks, including another new song "Ascend", written and recorded by Bane and Thwaite in 2014.

== Discography ==
- New Disease Discography
- Discogs.com
