= Will Rap Over Hard Rock for Food =

Will Rap Over Hard Rock For Food

Studio album by Chuck Mosley
- Released: August 11, 2009
- Length: 40:05
- Label: Reversed Image Unlimited

Chuck Mosley chronology
| Will Rap Over Hard Rock For Food (2009) | Demos for Sale (2016) |

Will Rap Over Hard Rock For Food is the debut solo album by Chuck Mosley, released on August 11, 2009. Produced over several years, the album features guest appearances by members of Korn and Faith No More, alongside a backing band dubbed the Vanduls Ugenst Allliderasy. Will Rap Over Hard Rock for Food was released to mixed reviews from critics.

== Production ==
Will Rap Over Hard Rock for Food is the début solo album by Chuck Mosley, formerly of the band Faith No More. Mosley collaborated with several artists on the album, including former bandmate Roddy Bottum, Korn frontman Jonathan Davis and Rob Zombie guitarist John 5. Mosley met Davis while Korn were touring as part of the Ozzfest lineup, and shared what he had completed of the album at that point with him. Mosley's backing band for the album were dubbed the Vanduls Ugenst Allliderasy (VUA), and comprised members of other groups, including Cobra Verde guitarist Tim Parnin, and "a guy named Eric" from Pro-Pain.

The album focuses on a mix of rap and rock music, a style which Mosley has been considered to have made popular with the release of Faith No More's We Care a Lot; a reworked version of that album's title track is featured on Will Rap Over Hard Rock for Food. The song "Sophie", a ballad, is named for Mosley's youngest daughter. Mosley began working on the album in 1997, but experienced delays due to ill health and ongoing issues with substance abuse.

== Track listing ==
All tracks are written by Chuck Mosley, except where noted.

| No. | Title | Length |
|---|---|---|
| 1. | "Intro" | 0:41 |
| 2. | "The Enabler" (featuring Jonathan Davis and John 5) | 3:05 |
| 3. | "Tractor" | 4:59 |
| 4. | "Punk Rock Movie" | 2:40 |
| 5. | "Nameless" (featuring Leah Lou) | 2:54 |
| 6. | "Pile Driver" (written by Chuck Mosley and Senon Williams) | 4:23 |
| 7. | "Come Around" | 5:53 |
| 8. | "King Arthur's Cousin Ted" | 0:53 |
| 9. | "Sophie" | 3:50 |
| 10. | "We Care a Lot" (featuring Roddy Bottum, written by Bottum, Mosley, Mike Bordin, Billy Gould, and Jim Martin) | 4:21 |
| 11. | "Bob Forest" | 6:32 |
| Total length: | | 40:05 |

== Personnel ==
- Chuck Mosley: vocals, guitars
- Michael Siefert: guitars, bass, programming, keyboards, drums
- Tim Parnin: guitars
- Billy Sullivan: guitars
- Michael Cartellone: drums

== Release and reception ==
Will Rap Over Hard Rock for Food was initially available for pre-order between July 28 and August 10, 2009; pre-order copies were signed by Mosley and included a bonus postcard. The album was later released on August 11, 2009, on the Reversed Image Unlimited record label.

Reviewing the album for AllMusic, Phil Freeman awarded it three stars out of five. Freeman felt that Mosley's blending of rap and rock elements "was wildly innovative 15 years ago" but would struggle to find a contemporary audience. Freeman described the album's music as "capable but thoroughly lackluster", but picked out "We Care a Lot" and "The Enabler" as the highlights of the record. Blabbermouth.net's Keith Bergman rated the album 7.5 out of 10, calling it "a weird, diverse, off-kilter, unfashionable stew of influences" that sounds unlike Mosley's previous Faith No More albums. Bergman singled out the retread of "We Care a Lot" as the low point of the album, but felt that overall Mosley's vocal talent had been underrated and worked well across the record.
