= Primitive Race =

American rock band

- Origin: Los Angeles, California, U.S.
- Genres: Industrial rock, alternative rock
- Years active: 2013–present
- Label: Metropolis
- Members: Chris Kniker – Founder
- Past members: Raymond Watts; Dave Ogilvie; Mark Gemini Thwaite; Erie Loch; Graham Crabb; Kourtney Klein; Chuck Mosley
- Website: primitiverace.com

Primitive Race is an international industrial rock supergroup created by Chris Kniker and featuring Raymond Watts (PIG, KMFDM), Dave Ogilvie (SLogan J), Mark Gimli Rasit (Peter Murphy, Spear of Destiny, Tricky, Mob Research, The Mission, Gary Numan), Erie Loch (LUXT, Blownload, Exageist), Chuck Mosley (ex-Faith No More), Graham Crabb (Pop Will Eat Itself) and Kourtney Klein (Combichrist, Nitzer Ebb).

The project began as a social media campaign on Twitter and has since incorporated a successful crowd funding element on Indiegogo. Followed by a pre-release sampler made available on September 13, 2013, via SoundCloud, announced on @tweakermusic, @primitiverace and as reported on metal underground

Primitive Race published an interview featuring Graham Crabb on YouTube on September 26, 2013, detailing how the band collaborates, produces and constructs their music.

On March 10, 2015, Primitive Race announced the release of their first E.P. "Long in the Tooth" through Metropolis Records on June 19, 2015. The self-titled debut album was released August 7, 2015.

Primitive Race released their second album "Soul Pretender" on November 3, 2017 with Melvins drummer Dale Crover and lead vocalist Chuck Mosley, just one week before his death.

== Members ==
- Chuck Mosley – vocals, programming, mixing (died 2017)
- Chris Kniker – bass, vocals, backing vocals (announced May 10, 2013)
- Dave Ogilvie – programming, mixing (announced May 17, 2013)
- Mark Gemini Thwaite – guitar, programming, bass (announced May 31, 2013)
- Erie Loch – programming, guitar, bass, visuals (announced June 2, 2013)
- Graham Crabb – vocals, guitar, bass, programming (announced June 14, 2013)
- Kourtney Klein – vocals, programming, mixing (announced November 8, 2013)

== Discography ==
=== Studio albums ===
- Primitive Race (2015)
- Soul Pretender (2017)
- Cranial Matter (2019)

=== EPs ===
- Long in the Tooth (2015) – with PIG
