= Reversed Image Unlimited =

American record label

Reversed Image Unlimited is a record label featuring electronic, rock and pop artists. Located in Cleveland, Ohio, Reversed Image is owned and operated by multi-platinum award-winning producer, engineer, arranger, and composer Michael Seifert. Reversed Image's releases for 2009 include Love Kills (May 5) by THIS IS A SHAKEDOWN! and Will Rap Over Hard Rock For Food (August 11) by Chuck Mosley.
