= Kourtney Klein =

American drummer, vocalist, keyboardist

Kourtney Klein is a music producer, vocalist, keyboardist, and drummer who is best known as the lead vocalist the synthpop band Army on the Dance Floor. She was previously a member of Combichrist.

== Biography ==
Klein grew up in Temecula, California. A classically trained mallet percussionist, she attended Riverside Community College, where she studied sound engineering. In 2005, she hosted the Spike TV show Boom!.

She performed as a touring musician for industrial bands Nitzer Ebb and Combichrist between 2006 and 2009 before forming her own group, Army on the Dance Floor, in 2011. The group released their first single, "Listen Like Strangers", in March 2012. They toured in late 2013. Their debut album, Many Faces of War, was released in January 2014. Klein is also a contributor to the industrial supergroup Primitive Race.
