= Mark Thwaite =

British guitarist

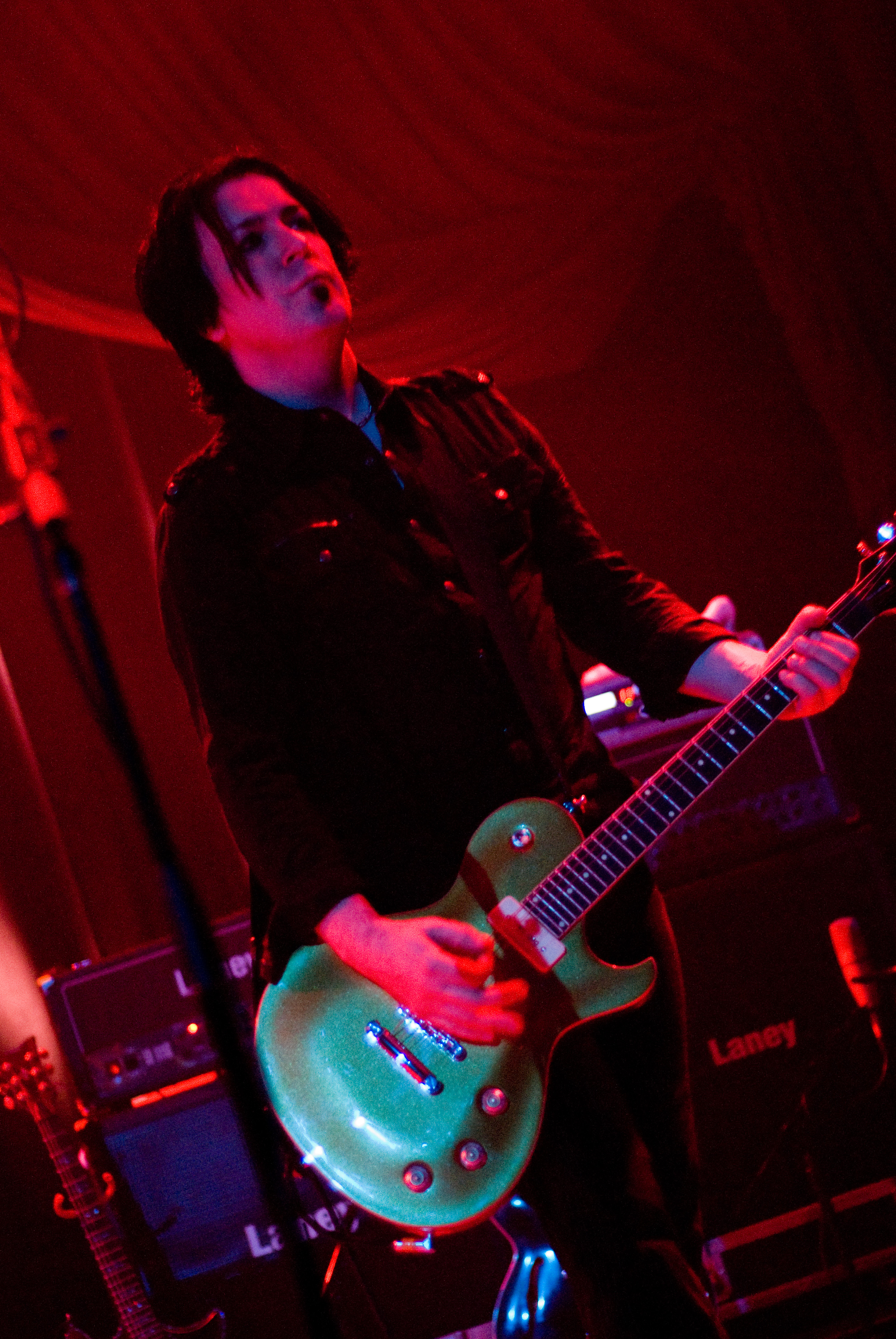
- Mark Gemini Thwaite performing at a Peter Murphy gig, HOB Chicago, 2009

Background information
- Also known as: MGT
- Born: Mark Gemini Thwaite; 15 June 1965 (age 61); Birmingham, England
- Genres: Industrial rock, alternative rock, alternative metal, gothic rock, hard rock
- Occupations: Musician, songwriter
- Instrument: Guitar
- Labels: Sony Music/Echozone, SPV
- Website: mgtofficial.com

Mark Gemini Thwaite (born 15 June 1965), also known as MGT, is an English musician who has been the guitarist for a number of rock bands and artists, including The Mission, trip hop pioneer Tricky, Peter Murphy of Bauhaus, New Disease, Spear of Destiny & Theatre of Hate, Mob Research (with Paul Raven of Killing Joke), and Canadian band National Velvet plus various live and recorded appearances with Gary Numan, Al Jourgensen of Ministry, Revolting Cocks, Roger Daltrey of the Who, P.J. Harvey, Alanis Morissette, Raymond Watts and PIG, Primitive Race (with Chuck Mosley of Faith No More), Ricky Warwick of Thin Lizzy, Ginger of The Wildhearts, Stan Lee of Marvel Comics, Franz Treichler of The Young Gods, Miles Hunt & The Wonder Stuff, Burton C. Bell of Fear Factory, American rapper DMX, Laurence "Lol" Tolhurst and Porl Thompson of The Cure and Ville Valo of Finnish band HIM.

== Early years ==
Thwaite was born in Marston Green, Birmingham, and moved to Lichfield in Staffordshire in the early 1970s, attending Christ Church Primary School and then Lichfield Friary Grange comprehensive school from 1977. He formed his first school band with fellow school-mate Steve Ellett (drums), a.k.a. Steve Danger from British metal band Wolfsbane. Thwaite later formed Lichfield-based rock band Monteagle with local musicians including Martin Wilkins (drums) and Dave Pearson, later known as Computerchemist. Thwaite spent part of 1985 living in Toronto, Ontario, Canada, joining Gothic rock band National Velvet, before returning to the UK in 1986. After forming a few bands in the Birmingham area, including The First, he relocated to London in 1989.

In 1989, Thwaite joined London-based Gothic group The Children (featuring Dave Roberts of Sex Gang Children on vocals), and performed on the 12" single "Never Get Out Alive", released in 1990. During this time Thwaite was introduced to Kirk Brandon, founder member and vocalist for Spear of Destiny and Theatre of Hate. This began a three-year collaboration between Thwaite and Brandon.

Thwaite performed live with Spear of Destiny in 1990, and replaced original Theatre of Hate guitarist Billy Duffy on the 10th anniversary Theatre of Hate UK tour in 1991. A TOH live album 'Live at the Astoria '91' including Thwaite on guitar was subsequently released by Easterstone records. Thwaite continued as a member of Spear of Destiny, contributing guitars and some bass guitar to their 1992 album Sod's Law and the subsequent tour that same year.

== Career ==
=== The Mission, 1992–1996 ===
In 1992, Thwaite joined UK Gothic rock band The Mission. During this period, Thwaite also collaborated with Roger Daltrey of The Who on a BBC radio play titled A Fake's Progress, based on the life of Twiggy's manager Justin de Villeneuve. Thwaite also contributed guitars to a remix for Situation 2 release Salvation (SIT 98) by UK band Terminal Power Company.

Thwaite featured on two studio albums with The Mission during this period, Neverland and Blue, and singles compilation album Sum and Substance before they disbanded in 1996; he would later rejoin the reformed band in 1999 and record on three more studio albums and several live albums and DVDs with the band. He toured with the band throughout this period, which included two broadcasts on German television. Thwaite also performed live with UK band Mice at the UK Phoenix Festival and London's Highbury Garage in 1997, with a lineup featuring All About Eve singer Julianne Regan and AAE/Mission bassist Andy Cousin.

=== Tricky ===
In 1998, Thwaite was invited to join Tricky's live band for his upcoming world tour to promote studio album Angels with Dirty Faces. Thwaite continued to work with Tricky, touring with the live band worldwide and contributing to three studio albums and an EP – Mission Accomplished EP (2000), Blowback (2001), Vulnerable (2003) and Knowle West Boy (2008) and performing with Tricky and P.J. Harvey on the Late Show with David Letterman and Late Night with Conan O'Brien. He also performed with Tricky on UK show Later With Jools Holland. He also performed guitar on Tricky's remix of MethodMan's "Judgement Day" single.

=== The Mission, 1999 and onwards ===
The Mission re-formed once again in 1999, with Thwaite rejoining the band to tour the US and Europe. Following the success of the tour, the band continued, undertaking a world tour in 2000 and releasing a live CD entitled Ever After. Thwaite remained with the band to record their next studio album, Aura (2001).

During the same period, Thwaite also recorded guitars for Tricky's Mission Accomplished EP – his first for Epitaph records, released in 2000, followed by Blowback, an album which included collaborations between Thwaite and Alanis Morissette, Flea, Anthony Kiedis and John Frusciante.

Owing to touring commitments with Tricky, Thwaite was unable to play on The Mission's next tour, and officially left the band in September 2001. He toured the United States with Tricky, as special guests of rock band Tool in 2001. While continuing to work with Tricky, Thwaite also collaborated with Gary Numan on heavy industrial metal reworkings of Are 'Friends' Electric? and This Wreckage for Numan's RIP single (released in 2002) and Hybrid album (2003).

=== New Disease ===
In 2002 Thwaite formed UK-based rock band New Disease. releasing the Axiomatic EP in 2003, co-produced by John Fryer. In 2004 the band signed to Universal records and released the single Like Rain produced by Canadian producer David Bottrill (Tool, Muse, Rush), the band were later dropped by Universal during a restructure, with the band's debut album unreleased, and Thwaite relocated to the US in 2005. The band would release the posthumous album Patent Life 10 years later in 2014.

=== Peter Murphy ===
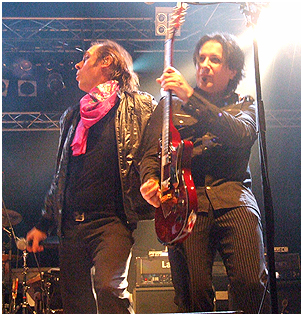
Thwaite and Murphy in 2009

Thwaite toured the United States and Europe in summer 2005 with Bauhaus vocalist Peter Murphy to promote Murphy's album Unshattered. During this period, Wayne Hussey invited Thwaite to rejoin The Mission for shows in South Africa in July 2005; Thwaite agreed, and played shows in South Africa followed by an extensive Europe-wide tour later that year.

In 2006 Thwaite joined New York-based singer songwriter Sarah Fimm for a concert supporting British goth pioneers Bauhaus in Buffalo, New York, which was followed by a week of recording sessions in Woodstock, NY featuring session drummer Josh Freese, best known for his work with Nine Inch Nails and Devo plus Tony Levin on bass, known for his work with King Crimson and Peter Gabriel. Peter Murphy also makes a guest appearance on vocals.

MGT would continue to perform with Murphy's band until 2015, recording on his Ninth album and The Secret Bees of Ninth EP (both 2011), as well as the Mr. Moonlight Tour: 35 Years of Bauhaus live DVD (2014). Thwaite toured once again with Murphy from October 2018 through March 2019 for his 40 Years of Bauhaus Ruby Celebration featuring David J tour of North and South America, Europe, Australia, New Zealand, and Russia. This was followed by Thwaite performing guitar duties on Murphy career retrospective residencies in San Francisco in March 2019 and Le Poisson Rouge in New York City in both August 2019 and rescheduled shows in January 2020 following Peter Murphys heart attack.

=== Mob Research ===
In March 2007 Thwaite formed a studio-based project Mob Research with Killing Joke / Ministry bassist Paul Raven and Warrior Soul vocalist Kory Clarke. Work on the band's debut album, Holy City Zoo, was halted by Raven's sudden death in October 2007: the remaining band members decided to complete the album in honour of Raven. The album was finally released by Echozone Records in 2009. The remaining band members reconvened three years later in 2012 and released the "Motormouth" EP on Echozone records. The release also featured a collaboration between Thwaite and Franz Treichler of The Young Gods Thwaite also appeared on the Warrior Soul album Stiff Middle Finger, released in October 2012, contributing lead guitars.

Thwaite's ongoing collaboration with Trip Hop pioneer Tricky also continues, with contributions to 2008 studio album Knowle West Boy: he also continued as a member of The Mission, contributing to their 2007 album God is a Bullet, and playing live with them, first to promote the album and then for their four-show "farewell" event and at the Shepherd's Bush Empire in London.

=== Al Jourgensen ===
During 2009, Thwaite collaborated with Al Jourgensen of Ministry and Revolting Cocks on It's Always Christmas Time, a Christmas-themed single released in November 2009. In December 2009 Thwaite joined Jourgensen in his recording studio in El Paso, Texas to write and record material for a forthcoming solo project by Jourgensen. The Mission released the live video of the Farewell shows recorded in 2008 on the Final ChapterDVD box set, which reached No.6 in the UK Music DVD chart.

Thwaite continued to work with Jourgensen, playing lead guitar on the track Filthy Senoritas, from the Revolting Cocks 2010 album Got Cock? released in April 2010. He also played on Voices in My Head and Walkie Talkie, which was made available as a bonus download to those who purchased the 'Got Cock?' RevCo album. Works also commences on a Jourgensen 'solo' album with Thwaite, Mike Scaccia and Tony Campos of Ministry.

In summer 2010 Thwaite resumed touring with Peter Murphy, undertaking the Dirty Dirt European tour and some dates in Canada. During the tour Thwaite joined frontman Andy LaPlegua and his band Combichrist onstage playing guitar during the band's encore at London Electric Ballroom on 5 August 2010. Thwaite had previously remixed a track by the band in 2008 under his Metalmorphosis alter ego.

In 2011 Thwaite joined Peter Murphy and band for a 29 date US tour promoting the studio album Ninth released on 7 June 2011,. In the autumn of 2011 Thwaite also made a guest appearance onstage with his old band The Mission at their sold out 25th Anniversary show at London Brixton Academy on 22 October with special guests Fields of the Nephilim. The concert was filmed and later released as Silver on DVD/Blu-ray.

In 2012 Thwaite also undertook more international touring with Peter Murphy, including a performance at Club Nokia on 15 September in Los Angeles featuring a duet between Peter Murphy and Marvel Comics legend Stan Lee, with Thwaite on guitar. In 2013 Peter Murphy undertakes a world tour performing a 100% Bauhaus set, billed as 'Mr. Moonlight – Celebrating 35yrs of Bauhaus', including Thwaite on guitar. The tour rates in the top 50 Pollstar US tours of 2013.

=== Gary Numan ===
Thwaite joined electronic icon Gary Numan and his band for a US tour in the summer of 2013, in place of Nine Inch Nails guitarist Robin Finck, who was originally signed on for the tour but was called back to Nine Inch Nails. Thwaite subsequently played guitar on the tour and performed with both Numan and Finck at the band's Santa Ana show in September 2013, where Finck guests with the band for 6 songs.

Later that year Thwaite announced he was leaving the Peter Murphy band due to 'personal differences'. Thwaite subsequently appeared as guitarist on the 'Mr Moonlight' live DVD, which was released by Nettwerk records in June 2014, recorded live at the Henry Fonda Theatre in Hollywood. In 2014 Thwaite collaborated with Ginger Wildheart of The Wildhearts, along with Robin Diaz of the Courtney Love band and Jimmy Ashhurst ex Buckcherry on several recordings for G-A-S-S, subsequently appearing on Ginger's 'Year of the Fanclub' solo album released in 2016. Thwaite also recorded guest guitars on "Toffee Town" from the solo album for Ricky Warwick of Thin Lizzy and Black Star Riders. In addition he contributed strings and mixes 4 acoustic tracks for Black Star Riders second album The Killer Instinct on Nuclear Blast records, also fronted by Warwick, which debuted at #2 in the UK National Rock Charts in March 2015.

=== Primitive Race / PIG ===
On 10 March 2015 Primitive Race announced the release of their first E.P. "Long in the Tooth" through Metropolis Records on 19 June 2015. The EP features vocals by Raymond Watts (of PIG) and guitars by Thwaite. Thwaite also co-wrote and recorded on numerous tracks on PIG album 'The Gospel' which was released on Metropolis records in 2016. This was followed by the full-length album 'Primitive Race' also on Metropolis records released on 7 August, featuring Thwaite on many of the tracks, including collaborations with Tommy Victor of US metal band Prong, Dave Ogilvie (Skinny Puppy), and Graham Crabb (Pop Will Eat Itself) In 2017 Primitive Race announced a second album with ex Faith No More frontman Chuck Mosley on vocals, guitarist Mark Gemini Thwaite, Erie Loch (LUXT, Blownload, Exageist), bassist Chris Kniker and drummer Dale Crover of Melvins. The new lineup recorded and released the second album 'Soul Pretender' on 3 November 2017 on Metropolis records to positive reviews, only a week before Mosley died suddenly at age 57.

=== Ricky Warwick & The Fighting Hearts ===
Thwaite tours with Ricky Warwick and the Fighting Hearts twice in 2016. MGT appeared on Warwick's latest solo album When Patsy Cline Was Crazy (And Guy Mitchell Sang The Blues), and appears in the promotional video for 'Celebrating Sinking', released on Nuclear Blast records in February 2016. The release also includes guest appearances by Joe Elliott (Def Leppard), Damon Johnson (Thin Lizzy), Andy Cairns (Therapy?), Billy Morrison (Billy Idol), Nathan Connolly (Snow Patrol), Ginger Wildheart, Jake Burns (Stiff Little Fingers) and Richard Fortus (Guns N' Roses)

=== MGT ===
In March 2016 Thwaite announced that he had signed with Hanover record imprint SPV Records and released his debut solo album, "Volumes" under his MGT acronym at the end of June worldwide. The lead single, "Knowing Me Knowing You", a cover version of the ABBA classic featuring guest vocalist Ville Valo of HIM, is released in April, mixed by Tim Palmer and mastered by Maor Appelbaum, and a promotional video featuring both MGT & Valo is posted on YouTube, with over half a million views in one month (over 2M views in 18 months). Valo is not the only guest musician on "Volumes", other appearances include Wayne Hussey of Mark's previous band The Mission, Miles Hunt, Ricky Warwick (Black Star Riders, Thin Lizzy), Raymond Watts (PIG, KMFDM), Saffron (Republica), Julianne Regan (All About Eve), Ashton Nyte (The Awakening), Carlo Van Putten (Dead Guitars) and goth legend Andi Sex Gang.

In July 2017 Cleopatra records announced that MGT has signed a deal with the US based label for a new record. In February 2018 MGT release 'The Assembly Line Cured mix', a standalone single collaboration with Laurence "Lol" Tolhurst & Porl Thompson, both founder members of The Cure. This is followed by the second album 'Gemini Nyte', released on 23 February 2018, co-written with Nyte who handles all vocal duties, along with 'Big' Paul Ferguson from Killing Joke on drums, plus a guest vocal appearance by Burton C. Bell of Fear Factory, who Thwaite also performs live with Bell as part of Ascension of the Watchers at Cold Waves festival in 2017, later contributing guitars to the AOTW album "Apocrypha" released in 2021.

Thwaite joins Ginger of The Wildhearts onstage in London in December 2018 to perform several songs including two Hanoi Rocks songs with Hanoi singer Michael Monroe and 'Endangered Species' with punk band UK Subs frontman Charlie Harper, subsequently featured on the live album 'Ginger Wildheart's Birthday Bash 2018'. Thwaite also appears on Big Paul Ferguson's first solo record 'Remote Viewing EP' in 2018, and co-writes & records on the full-length studio album 'Virtual Control' in summer 2021.

In September 2019, Thwaite began offering remote recording services through the online site Airgigs and has since appeared with Nik Hughes and Corey Britz of Bush, Dan Konopka of OK Go and Mark King of Hinder on God Analog's debut album.

=== The Wonder Stuff ===
In May 2019, Thwaite joined UK band The Wonder Stuff on live UK tour dates on bass guitar, and co-wrote and recorded on the band's ninth full-length studio album, Better Being Lucky, touring again with the band in winter 2019 on bass and electric guitars, performing the band's first two albums 'The Eight Legged Groove Machine' & 'Hup' in their entirety. Thwaite would continue with the band on guitar duties for UK tours in 2022 (performing the band's 'Never Loved Elvis' album in full) and 'Construction for the Modern Idiot' in 2023, also performing that album in full.

=== SEVENDIALS ===
In February 2025 new post-punk band Sevendials - founded by MGT - announced their debut single and video for 'Zodiac Morals, released by new label imprint CREATION YOUTH records formed by Killing Joke bassist & producer Youth and Creation records founder Alan McGee. Comprising the line-up of vocalist Chris Connelly (Ministry, Revolting Cocks, Murder, Inc.), drummer Paul Ferguson (Killing Joke, Murder, Inc.) and guitarist Mark Gemini Thwaite (The Mission, Peter Murphy, the band's debut album 'A Crash Course in Catastrophe' was released on vinyl and CD on 11 April 2025, featuring a turbo-charged cover of Sparks 1979 synthpop classic 'Number One Song in Heaven'.

== Equipment ==
Thwaite currently holds an artist endorsement with Schecter Guitar Research, and the Schecter Mark Thwaite Signature Solo-II guitar model debuted at NAMM in January 2017. MGT also holds endorsement deals with Mesa Boogie Amplification, GHS Strings, Roland/Boss FX USA, Seymour Duncan, and Pro Tone effects pedals who also released the MGT Dirty Chorus signature pedal in autumn 2016. He also has a long association with Gibson Les Paul guitars, having played them frequently since first joining Spear of Destiny in 1990.

== Discography ==
| Date | Band | Title | Format | Label |
|---|---|---|---|---|
| 1991 | Theatre of Hate | Live at the Astoria 91 | CD | Easterstone |
| 1992 | Spear of Destiny | Sod's Law | CD/Vinyl | Burning Rome |
| 1994 | The Mission | Sum and Substance | CD/Vinyl | Phonogram/Mercury |
| 1995 | The Mission | Neverland | CD/Vinyl | Equator/Sony Dragnet |
| 1996 | The Mission | Blue | CD/Vinyl | Equator/Sony Dragnet |
| 1999 | The Lucy Nation | Austin Powers: The Spy Who Shagged Me: Music From the Motion Picture | CD/Vinyl | Warners /Maverick |
| 1999 | Method Man / Tricky | Judgement Day Remixes | CD | Def Jam |
| 2000 | Tricky | Mission Accomplished EP | CD/Vinyl | Epitaph |
| 2000 | Grand Theft Audio | Blame Everyone | CD | WEA/London/Sire |
| 2000 | The Mission | Ever After | CD | Trojan/Receiver |
| 2001 | Tricky | Blowback | CD/Vinyl | Anti/Epitaph |
| 2001 | The Mission | Aura | CD/Vinyl | SPV/Playground |
| 2002 | The Mission | Aural Delight | CD/Vinyl | SPV/Playground |
| 2002 | Gary Numan | RIP EP | CD | Jagged Halo/Universal |
| 2003 | Gary Numan | Hybrid | CD | Jagged Halo/Universal |
| 2003 | Tricky | Vulnerable | CD/Vinyl | Anti/Epitaph |
| 2003 | New Disease | Axiomatic EP | CD | ChangesOne |
| 2004 | New Disease | Like Rain | CD/Vinyl | Universal |
| 2007 | The Mission | God is a Bullet | CD/Vinyl | SPV |
| 2007 | The Mission | Live MMVII | CD | Concert Live |
| 2008 | Tricky | Knowle West Boy | CD/Vinyl | Domino |
| 2009 | Revolting Cocks | Sex-O-Mixx-O | CD/Vinyl | 13th Planet |
| 2009 | The Mission | The Final Chapter live | DVD | SPV |
| 2009 | The Mission | Live & Last | CD | Eyes Wide Shut |
| 2009 | The Mission | The First Chapter: Live | CD/Vinyl | Goth Collector's Series |
| 2009 | The Mission | God's Own Medicine: Live | CD/Vinyl | Goth Collector's Series |
| 2009 | The Mission | Children: Live | CD/Vinyl | Goth Collector's Series |
| 2009 | The Mission | Carved in Sand: Live | CD/Vinyl | Goth Collector's Series |
| 2009 | Mob Research | Holy City Zoo | CD | Echozone/Sony Music |
| 2010 | Revolting Cocks /RevCo | Got Cock? | CD/Vinyl | 13th Planet |
| 2010 | Al Jourgensen & Mark Thwaite | It's Always Christmas Time | CD | 13th Planet |
| 2010 | Al Jourgensen | Voices in My Head | CD | 13th Planet |
| 2010 | The Mission | Dum Dum Bullet | CD | SPV |
| 2011 | Peter Murphy | "I Spit Roses EP" | CD/MP3 | Nettwerk |
| 2011 | Peter Murphy | "See Saw Sway" | CD/MP3 | Nettwerk |
| 2011 | Peter Murphy | Ninth | CD/Vinyl/MP3 | Nettwerk |
| 2011 | Peter Murphy | The Secret Bees of Ninth | CD/Vinyl/MP3 | Nettwerk |
| 2011 | Aesthetic Perfection | The Devil's in the Details EP | CD/MP3 | Limited Edition |
| 2012 | Mob Research | Motormouth EP | CD/MP3 | Echozone/Sony Music |
| 2012 | Warrior Soul | Stiff Middle Finger | CD/MP3 | Cargo |
| 2012 | Erica Nockalls | Imminent Room | CD | Independent |
| 2013 | Imperative Reaction | "Siphon EP" | MP3 | BandCamp |
| 2013 | Sex Gang Children | Viva Vigilante | CD/MP3 | SongAndLegend |
| 2014 | Peter Murphy | Mr Moonlight Tour:35 Years of Bauhaus live | DVD | Nettwerk |
| 2014 | Erica Nockalls | EN2 | CD | Independent |
| 2015 | Black Star Riders | The Killer Instinct Deluxe Edition | CD/Vinyl | Nuclear Blast |
| 2015 | New Disease | "Patent Life Deluxe" | CD/MP3 | Armalyte |
| 2015 | Ricky Warwick | "Stairwell Troubadour" | CD/MP3 | PledgeMusic |
| 2015 | PIG vs Primitive Race | "Long in the Tooth EP" | CD/MP3 | Metropolis |
| 2015 | Primitive Race | "Primitive Race" | CD/MP3 | Metropolis |
| 2015 | Bluemax | "Bluemax" | MP3 | Emission |
| 2016 | Ricky Warwick | –"When Patsy Cline was Crazy (And Guy Mitchell Sang the Blues)" | CD/MP3 | Nuclear Blast |
| 2016 | Ginger Wildheart | "Year of The Fan Club" | CD/MP3 | Round Records |
| 2016 | MGT with Ville Valo | "Knowing Me Knowing You" | MP3 | SPV/Oblivion |
| 2016 | MGT | "Volumes" | CD/MP3 | SPV/Oblivion |
| 2016 | PIG | The Gospel | CD/MP3/Vinyl | Metropolis |
| 2016 | Ginger Wildheart | "From G*A*S*S with Love"/"Friends of Bill" – Limited Edition | Vinyl | Round Records |
| 2017 | Primitive Race | Soul Pretender | CD/MP3 | Metropolis |
| 2017 | BPF (of Killing Joke) | "The Great Motivator" / Twilight of the Mortals EP | 7" Vinyl | PC Press |
| 2017 | MGT | "All The Broken Things" | Digital MP3 | Cleopatra |
| 2018 | MGT | The Assembly Line Cured mix with Lol Tolhurst/Pearl Thompson | Digital MP3 | Cleopatra |
| 2018 | MGT | Gemini Nyte | CD/Digital MP3 | Cleopatra |
| 2018 | The Mission | For Ever More – Live at London Shepherd's Bush Empire Box set | CD/Digital MP3 | Cherry Red |
| 2018 | The Mission | Live at Rockpalast 1990/1995 DVD/CD Box set | CD/Digital MP3 | Mig Music |
| 2018 | BPF (Big Paul Ferguson) | Remote Viewing | CD/Digital MP3 | Dead Radio Station Record Label |
| 2018 | Ginger Wildheart | G*A*S*S MARK II | Digital MP3 | Round Records |
| 2019 | Sex Gang Children | Fear Silk & Sex 1981-2013 (feat. MGT remixes) | CD/Digital MP3 | Cleopatra Records |
| 2019 | Peter Murphy | Live in London (live at Brixton Academy Dec 2018) | CD/Vinyl/Digital MP3 | Live Here Now |
| 2019 | The Wonder Stuff | Better Being Lucky | CD/MP3/Vinyl | Good Deeds Music |
| 2020 | MGT | "How Long" w. Chris Connelly | Digital MP3 | Cleopatra |
| 2021 | Ricky Warwick | When Life Was Hard & Fast (2xCD) | CD/Digital MP3 | Nuclear Blast |
| 2021 | (Big Paul Ferguson) | Virtual Control | CD/Vinyl/Digital MP3 | Cleopatra records |
| 2021 | Ascension of the Watchers | Apocrypha | CD/Digital MP3 | Dissonance Productions |
| 2022 | Pailhead | Man Should Surrender (MGT mix)single | Vinyl/Digital MP3 | Cleopatra |
| 2022 | DMX | Know What I Am (co-written/produced by M.G.T.) | Vinyl/Digital MP3 | X-Ray |
| 2022 | The Mission | Collected | CD/Vinyl/Digital MP3 | Universal |
| 2023 | Burton C. Bell | Du Hast A Tribute to Rammstein | CD/Vinyl/Digital MP3 | Cleopatra |
| 2024 | Peter Murphy | Peter Live Vol.1-Covers | Vinyl | Cadiz Music/Silver Shade |
| 2024 | Peter Murphy | Peter Live-Volume 2-Blender Theater New York 2008 | Vinyl | Cadiz Music/Silver Shade |
| 2025 | Sevendials | A Crash Course in Catastrophe | CD/Vinyl/Digital | Creation Youth Music |
