= Chuck Mosley =

American musician (1959–2017)

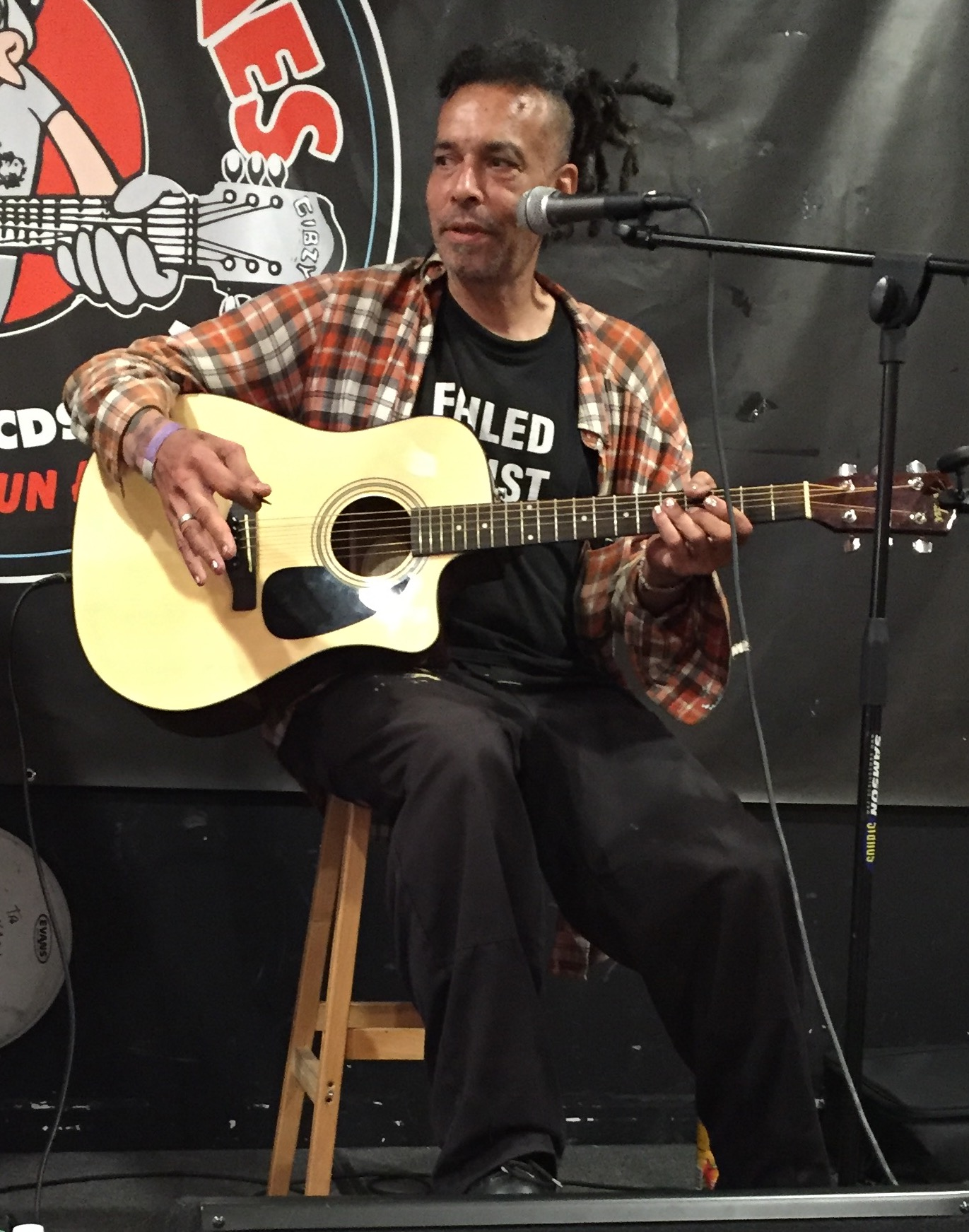
- Mosley in 2016

Background information
- Born: Charles Henry Mosley III; December 26, 1959; Los Angeles, California, U.S.
- Died: November 9, 2017 (aged 57) Cleveland, Ohio, U.S.
- Genres: Funk metal; alternative metal; alternative rock; hardcore punk
- Occupations: Musician; singer; songwriter
- Instruments: Vocals; guitar; keyboards
- Years active: 1979–2017
- Formerly of: Bad Brains; Cement; Faith No More; VUA; Indoria; Primitive Race

Charles Henry Mosley III (December 26, 1959 – November 9, 2017) was an American musician, singer and songwriter, best known as the lead vocalist for the rock band Faith No More from 1984 to 1988. He contributed to the band's early sound, combining elements of funk, punk, and rap-rock, and appeared on their first two albums, We Care a Lot (1985) and Introduce Yourself (1987). After leaving Faith No More, Mosley performed with bands like Bad Brains and Cement. He continued to influence the alternative music scene until his death in 2017.

== Biography ==
=== Early life ===
Mosley was born in the Hollywood district of Los Angeles, but raised in the South Central and Venice neighborhoods. He was adopted at a very early age. Coincidentally, both his biological parents and adoptive parents had the same ethnic backgrounds. In a 2013 interview, Mosley said his adoptive parents "met at some kind of socialist/communist get-together in the '50s. They were interracial—my mom was Jewish and my dad was black and Native American. So that was something controversial in itself. My dad had a daughter and my mom had two daughters, and all they were missing was a boy, so they went out and adopted one, and it was me."

=== Faith No More years ===
Mosley first met Billy Gould in 1977, at a The Zeros, Johnny Navotnee and Bags show. He then went on to play keyboards in Gould's first band The Animated in 1979. In 1984, he joined Haircuts That Kill, a post-punk band from the San Francisco area. He left the band to join Faith No More in 1985 replacing, among others, Courtney Love, as lead singer.

By 1987, Faith No More were gaining mainstream traction, signing with major label Slash Records (Warner Music Group) and touring with prominent acts such as Red Hot Chili Peppers. According to Billy Gould, he and other band members began to consider firing Mosley during a 1988 tour of Europe when his behaviour became increasingly erratic. Incidents include Mosley allegedly punching Gould on stage and one of Mosley's roadies getting into a fist fight with guitarist Jim Martin.

Gould stated: "By the time that happened, Chuck was already kind of out of it for me. I guess Jim and the roadie had been drinking and they got in a fight. It came a point where Jim was our guitar player, and he broke his hand fighting the guy. It's the first night of our European tour, and somebody had to go—it obviously wasn't going to be our guitar player. Chuck took it very personally, sticking up for this roadie."

Mosley was eventually fired after the band returned home from Europe. Gould said: "There was a certain point when I went to rehearsal, and Chuck wanted to do all acoustic guitar songs. It was just so far off the mark. The upshot was that I got up, walked out and quit the band. I just said: 'I'm done—I can't take this any longer. It's just so ridiculous'. The same day, I talked to Bordin, and he said: 'Well, I still want to play with you'. Roddy Bottum did the same thing. It was another one of these 'firing somebody without firing them' scenarios."

==== Subsequent legal battles ====
Mosley sued his bandmates in 1989, claiming a partnership interest in Faith No More's financial assets. They eventually settled, and Mosley agreed to give up his rights to most of the band's works, most of its assets, and its name. At the time of his death in 2017, there was an ongoing legal battle between Manifesto Records and Faith No More regarding the right to release the band's debut album We Care a Lot. Mosley stated in January 2016, "I am distraught that I am being sued by my former band members and even more distraught if I did something that would negatively impact my future relationship with the band, which I value. I consider certain members of Faith No More as my 'family.' I would never have signed the Manifesto contract if I fully appreciated the dissention [sic] it would cause or how the band would object."

=== Post-Faith No More ===
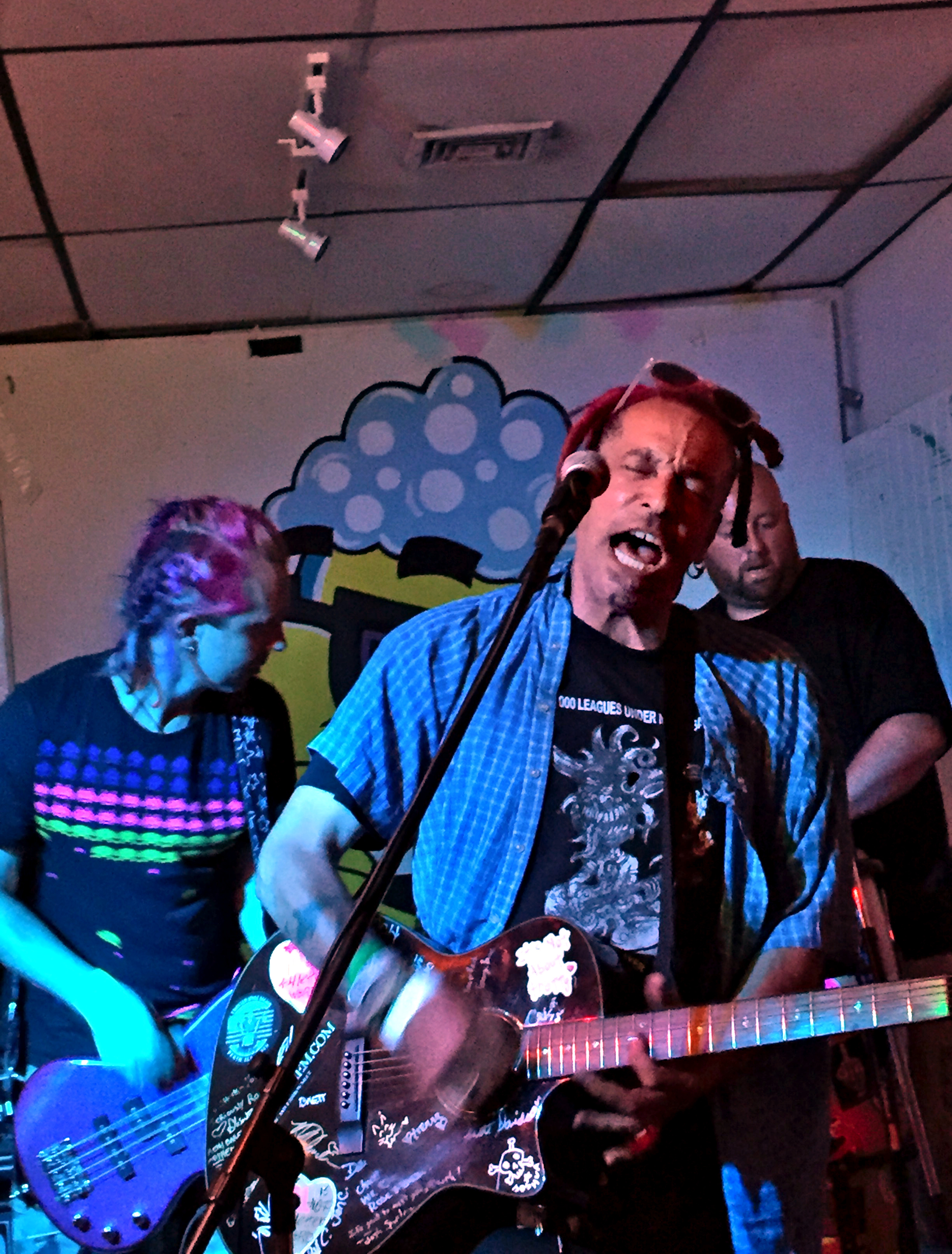
Mosley performing in New York - July 22, 2017

In 1990, Mosley began a stint as lead singer in the revered hardcore punk band Bad Brains. He performed at nearly 60 shows in the United States and Europe, then left the band in January 1992.

Mosley went on to form a new band, Cement in late 1992. They released two albums: Cement and Man with the Action Hair. Both albums were distributed by Dutch East India Trading (United States) and Rough Trade (Europe). The band toured both locations promoting their music. During the first week of what was to be a year-long tour for Man with the Action Hair, the band's driver fell asleep at the wheel, causing a major accident. Mosley spent a year recovering from a broken back, the tour was canceled, and the band was subsequently shelved.

Mosley moved to Cleveland, Ohio in March 1996, where he spent several years writing and compiling material while raising his two daughters and working as a chef in various restaurants.

On October 6, 2001, Mosley joined Unified Culture on stage to cover We Care A Lot.

In 2009, Mosley announced an album would be released under the name of "V.U.A. (Vanduls Ugenst Allliderasy)". The band name was extended to include Mosley's name. Will Rap Over Hard Rock for Food was released on August 11, 2009 by Reversed Image Unlimited. Guest appearances on the LP include Jonathan Davis (Korn), John 5 (Marilyn Manson, Rob Zombie), Michael Cartellone (Lynyrd Skynyrd), and Roddy Bottum (Imperial Teen, Faith No More), and Reversed Image labelmate Leah Lou.

On April 14, 2010, Mosley made an appearance on stage at a Faith No More concert in San Francisco, the first time since 1988 that he performed with the band. Mosley performed the songs "As the Worm Turns", "Death March", "We Care a Lot", and "Mark Bowen" on his own with the band, and was joined by frontman Mike Patton during the final encore, performing a duet of "Introduce Yourself".

On November 17, 2012, Mosley re-released his album Will Rap Over Hard Rock for Food while working on an autobiography.

In 2014, he was interviewed extensively for the book Punk! Hardcore! Reggae! PMA! Bad Brains! by author Greg Prato, where he recounted his time as singer of the band.

In late 2014, he publicly revealed that he was broke and that he and his family were on the verge of eviction: "The shocking truth is, that I'm not rich. We struggle every day, just like most everybody, more, right now, worse than ever, in a long time. I'm ashamed for being in this condition. Our band, VUA, has had to put off trying to tour or play any shows. We're starting to record new stuff, but even that is suffering at the hands of my family's financial situation."

In May 2015, he again made another appearance at a Faith No More concert, performing the track "Mark Bowen" at their Detroit show.

In fall 2015, Mosley published a non-fiction essay in an anthology titled A Matter of Words, about the writing and recording of the Faith No More track "Mark Bowen".

In mid-2016, Mosley toured the U.S. doing an "unplugged" show, and a reissue of the We Care a Lot album, with extra tracks. At a performance on July 20 that same year, Bottum joined Mosley on stage for a rendition of an Imperial Teen tune. A month later, Mosley performed two concerts with Faith No More, billed as Chuck Mosley and Friends, which Mosley opened with an acoustic set on August 18 in San Francisco and on August 20 in Los Angeles. This was the last time Mosley performed on stage with Faith No More, and it was also the last set of shows Faith No More did before entering a still-ongoing hiatus.

Mosley appeared as the vocalist on You'll Never Make the Six, the fourth album from the Cleveland band Indoria. The album, released August 30, 2016, featured an expanded role for Mosley, who had joined the band late during the recording of their previous release.

In 2017, Mosley joined Primitive Race, the industrial collective created by Chris Kniker featuring guitarist Mark Gemini Thwaite (Peter Murphy, Tricky, The Mission, Gary Numan), Erie Loch (LUXT, Blownload, Exageist), and drummer Dale Crover of Melvins. The lineup released sophomore album Soul Pretender with Metropolis Records on November 3, 2017, to positive reviews, just a week before Mosley's passing.

In July 2017, Mosley played a fictional version of himself in the film Like an Open Heart It Shines, written and directed by David Collupy.

In early 2018, it was announced that Mosley will be the subject of a forthcoming documentary Thanks. And Sorry: The Chuck Mosley Movie, directed by his guitarist Drew Fortier and produced by bandmate/manager Douglas Esper, who has written a memoir about their time together on the road and in the studio, titled Reintroducing Chuck Mosley.

== Death ==
On the evening of November 9, 2017, Mosley, aged 57, was found dead on the living room floor of his Cleveland home by his partner Pip Logan and their friend. Drug paraphernalia was discovered at the scene, with police suspecting a heroin overdose as the cause of death. His family released a statement that read:

After a long period of sobriety, Charles Henry Mosley III lost his life, on November 9th, 2017, due to the disease of addiction. We're sharing the manner in which he passed, in the hopes that it might serve as a warning or wake up call or beacon to anyone else struggling to fight for sobriety. He is survived by long-term partner Pip Logan, two daughters, Erica and Sophie and his grandson Wolfgang Logan Mosley. The family will be accepting donations for funeral expenses. Details to follow when arranged.

Faith No More released the following statement on its Facebook page:

It's with a heavy, heavy heart we acknowledge the passing of our friend and bandmate, Chuck Mosley. He was a reckless and caterwauling force of energy who delivered with conviction and helped set us on a track of uniqueness and originality that would not have developed the way it had had he not been a part. How fortunate we are to have been able to perform with him last year in a reunion style when we re-released our very first record. His enthusiasm, his sense of humor, his style and his bravado will be missed by so many. We were a family, an odd and dysfunctional family, and we'll be forever grateful for the time we shared with Chuck.

== Legacy and influences ==
Some of Mosley's influences included David Bowie, Iggy Pop, Roxy Music, Killing Joke, Motown, Michael Jackson and Black Sabbath. His rock/rap singing style has been cited as an influence by successful rap rock and nu metal groups such as Korn, Disturbed, and Limp Bizkit. Regarding the rap rock genre, Mosley stated in 2017 "I would say I am the originator. Some will argue and say the Chili Peppers, and I will say 'No, that was funk'. Some will say the Beastie Boys, and I'll say 'No, they were playing punk rock, then they started playing the beats, then they started playing the rock'."

The original recording of Faith No More's "We Care a Lot", for which he performed the vocals, has been featured as the theme song for the show Dirty Jobs as well as in the movies Grosse Pointe Blank and Bio-Dome.

== Discography ==
=== The Animated ===
- Four Song EP (keyboards) (1981)

=== Faith No More ===
- We Care a Lot (1985)
- Introduce Yourself (1987)

=== Cement ===
- Cement (1993)
- The Man with the Action Hair (1994)

=== Chuck Mosley and VUA ===
- Will Rap Over Hard Rock for Food (2009)
- Ericalution (Digital Single) (2015)
- Demos for Sale (2016)

=== Primitive Race ===
- Soul Pretender (2017)

=== Solo ===
- Joe Haze Session#2 (2019)
- First Hellos and Last Goodbyes (2020)

=== Guest appearances ===
- Indoria - "What I Feel", guest vocals (2014)
- Indoria - "You'll Never Make the Six", vocals and guitar (2016)
