= Mob Research =

Mob Research is an American-based rock band, with a multi-national lineup including Killing Joke / Ministry bassist Paul Raven, Warrior Soul vocalist Kory Clarke, and two members of Peter Murphy's band, guitarist Mark Thwaite formerly of The Mission, and drummer Nick Lucero formerly of Queens of the Stone Age.

== History ==
In 2007, Raven began work together with Mark Gemini Thwaite (The Mission, Peter Murphy) in Los Angeles on a new musical project called Mob Research. Warrior Soul frontman Kory Clarke, and ex-Queens of the Stone Age and Peter Murphy band drummer Nick Lucero completed the line-up.

Raven died of an apparent heart attack in his sleep on October 20, 2007 while recording with Treponem Pal in Geneva, Switzerland. At the time of his death, he was also recording with Mob Research on their debut album, Holy City Zoo. The core of the music for the album had already been recorded at the time of his death, with all of Raven's contributions already recorded, and four songs had also been completed with vocals by Kory Clarke at the time of Raven's death. The completion and subsequent commercial release of Holy City Zoo was delayed considerably as the remaining band members came to terms with Paul Raven's death and Clarke attempted to complete the remaining songs for the unreleased album. Work was completed in 2008 and the album was partly mixed by noted producer Tim Palmer and released in June 2009 on Echozone / Sony Music in Europe. The band's subsequent self-produced video for Tribe - partly composed as a homage to Raven - was included on the Klangrausch - Schmerzmittel DVD release by Echozone in December 2010.

In 2012, founder member and guitarist Mark Thwaite collaborated with vocalist Kory Clarke, on their first new material in three years since the Holy City Zoo album released in 2009, after being approached by record label Echozone to come up with a new Mob Research remix for a forthcoming EP.

The Motormouth, EP was released on limited edition gate-fold digipak CD and digital download on Echozone on May 18, 2012. The CD featured several new songs by Clarke/Thwaite - their first compositions since the death of Paul Raven in 2007 - including new songs "Motormouth", "Another Dead Day in Paradise" and an exclusive version of "In The Atmosphere" featuring Franz Treichler of The Young Gods on vocals. The original music "Atmosphere" was featured as an instrumental, lamenting the death of Raven on the Holy City Zoo album. The nine track CD and digital release also included bonus remixes by MarkGT, Aesthetic Perfection, de:ad:libel, Imperative Reaction, Hannibal and Inertia (featuring Reza of Killing Joke).

== Discography ==
- Holy City Zoo (2009)
- Echozone:Correlation (2010) - Wambulance
- Gothic Visions II (2010) - New Paradigm
- Plasmatic Mutation - Various (August 2010) - Wambulance
- Klangrausch - Schmerzmittel DVD (December 2010) - Tribe video
- Motormouth EP (2012).

== Musicians ==
- Paul Raven
- Mark Thwaite
- Kory Clarke
- Nick Lucero
- Franz Treichler of The Young Gods.
