= Long in the Tooth (Primitive Race EP) =

2015 studio album by PIG and Primitive Race

Studio album by PIG and Primitive Race
- Released: June 5, 2015
- Genre: Industrial
- Label: Metropolis

Primitive Race chronology
Long in the Tooth (2015)	Primitive Race (2015)

PIG chronology
Compound Eye Sessions (2015)	Long in the Tooth (2015)

Long In The Tooth is an EP by PIG (Raymond Watts) and Primitive Race released June 5, 2015 through Metropolis Records. The EP contains three new songs and various remixes by Army of the Universe, Mary Byker, Praga Kahn and more. It is the first release by the industrial supergroup Primitive Race. A remix of the title track that was unable to make the release due to technical problems was released through Primitive Race's official Facebook on April 1. The official music video for the song was posted on YouTube the following day.

== Track listing ==
No.	Title	Writer(s)	Length
1.	"Long In The Tooth"	Raymond Watts, Erie Loch, Chris Kniker	5:13
2.	"Long In the Tooth (Praga Khan Mix)"	Raymond Watts, Erie Loch, Chris Kniker, remix by Praga Kahn	4:08
3.	"Long Live Death"	Raymond Watts, Mark Gemini Thwaite, Dave Brown	3:40
4.	"Come For Deutschland"	Raymond Watts	4:42
5.	"Long In the Tooth (AK & Son Megamix)"	Raymond Watts, Erie Loch, Chris Kniker, Remix by Dave Minner and Son	4:11
6.	"Long In the Tooth (Crabbi Mix)"	Raymond Watts, Erie Loch, Chris Kniker, Remix and additional vocals by Graham Crabb	6:09
7.	"Come For Deutschland (Mary Byker Mix)"	Raymond Watts, Remix by Mary Byker	5:08
8.	"Long In The Tooth (Army Of The Universe Mix)"	Raymond Watts, Erie Loch, Chris Kniker, Remix by Trebla	4:52
9.	"Come For Deutschland (Night Club Mix)"	Raymond Watts, Remix by Mark Brooks	3:43
10.	"Long In the Tooth (Bells Into Machines Mix)"	Raymond Watts, Erie Loch, Chris Kniker, Remix by Brian Diemar	4:33
Total length:			46:19

== Credits ==
- Produced by: Raymond Watts, Erie Loch, Chris Kniker
- Mixed by: Raymond Watts
- Mastered by: Erie Loch
- Art Concept: Chris Kniker
- Design & Layout: Erie Loch
- Panorex: Jennifer Kniker
