= Kai (musician, born 1993) =

Rock musician

Kai 海
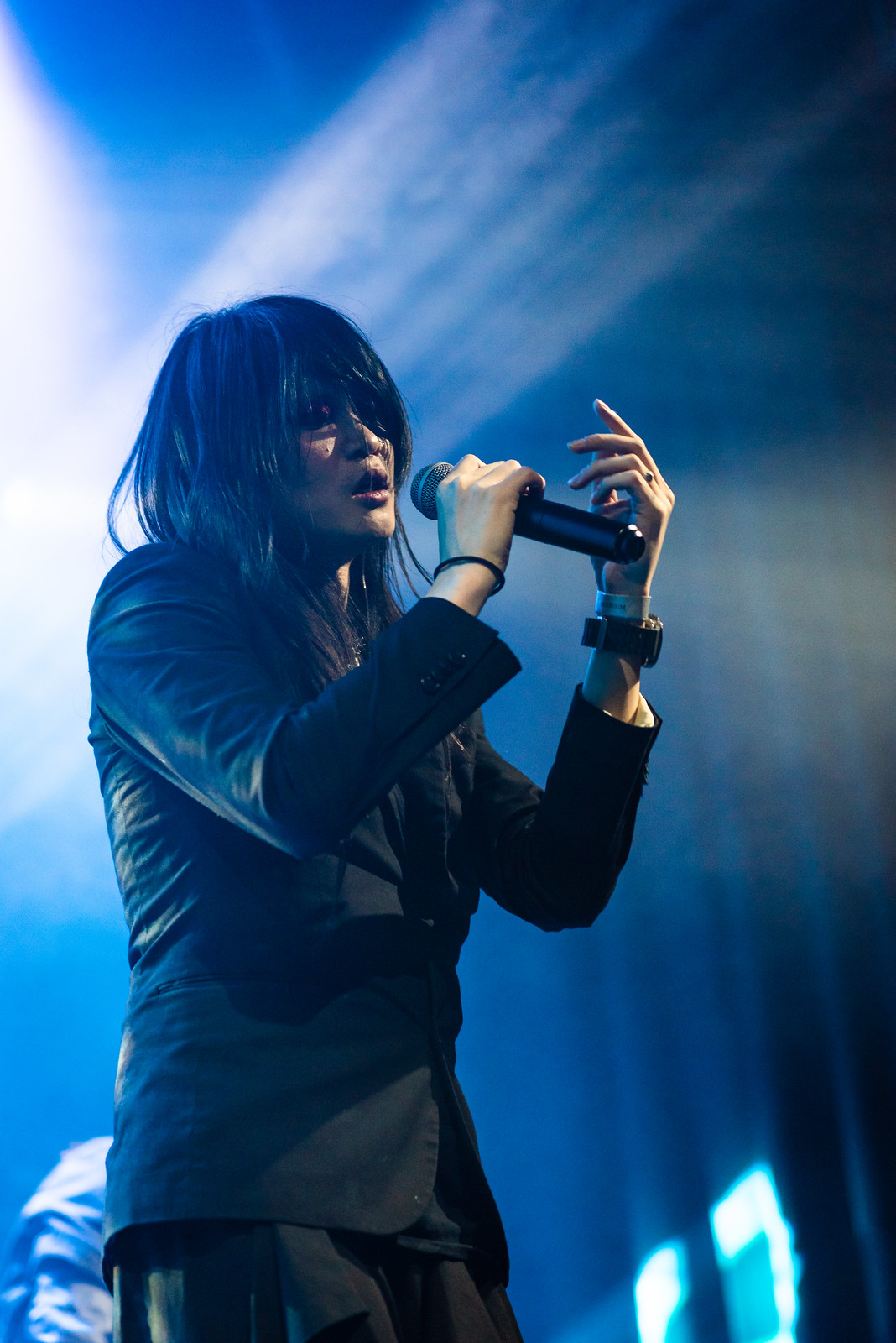
- Kai from Esprit D'Air performing at Electric Ballroom, London in 2025

Background information
- Genres: Heavy metal; progressive rock; gothic rock
- Occupations: Musician, songwriter, composer, producer
- Instruments: Guitar, vocals, bass, piano
- Years active: 2010–present
- Member of: Esprit D'Air, the Sisters of Mercy
- Website: www.espritdair.com twitch.tv/espritdair

Kai (Japanese: 海) is a rock singer, musician, producer, and leader of the Japanese rock and alternative metal group Esprit D'Air as a multi-instrumentalist. He (Note: Kai uses he/him and they/them pronouns. This article uses he/him for consistency.) is also one of the current guitarists for English rock band the Sisters of Mercy.

== Early life ==
Kai acquired his first guitar as a gift from his mother, but says that his father was not supportive of his musical aspirations, smashing a guitar against a wall in an act of frustration when he caught Kai skipping school to practice.

Kai has cited HYDE of L'Arc~en~Ciel as their first major musical influence, stating that seeing HYDE play guitar and sing in the music video for "HELLO" at the age of ten sparked his interest in becoming a musician. Kai began learning guitar at age 15, practising for up to ten hours a day.

== Career ==
=== Esprit D'Air ===
At the age of 17, Kai founded Esprit D'Air in London in 2010 as the lead guitarist. The band shortly went on hiatus in 2013 when most members returned to Japan.

Esprit D'Air later reformed as Kai's solo project in 2016 and have since produced a catalogue of albums and singles as lead vocalist, composer, and producer, regularly entering the Official Charts in various top ten positions. Notably, the singles "Leviathan" and the 2023 re-release of "Shizuku" reached the top ten.

Since then, Esprit D'Air has released three albums—Constellations (2018), which won Best Metal Album at the Independent Music Awards (judged by Slayer, Sepultura, and Amy Lee from Evanescence), Oceans (2022), which reached the top 10 of the Official Rock & Metal Albums Chart in the UK; and Seasons (2024), which contained unreleased work from the early era of the band, as well as covers and remixes.

Kai also books and promotes tours and concerts for Esprit D'Air without the help of booking agents and promoters. Kai has cited creative freedom and self-determination as the main reasons for avoiding record label contracts, stating, "What I love about what I do is that I don't have to compromise or answer to anyone else’s vision".

In the interview, when asked about possibly adding full-time members to Esprit D'Air, Kai explained that while he has long-term collaborators, he would not be able to run a band at the level they work at if he was not the full-time leader. Kai creates most of the songs, self-funds the project and handles the business side of the band alone.

In a 2026 interview with French music publication Prémonition, Kai clarified that Esprit D'Air remained his primary musical project, describing his role as its vocalist, guitarist, manager and producer. He emphasised that his career with Esprit D'Air predated his involvement with the Sisters of Mercy and that the two represented distinct professional roles.

=== The Sisters of Mercy ===
In mid-October 2023, Kai joined the Sisters of Mercy as a guitarist and backing vocalist and is touring extensively in Europe, North America, and South America. After being introduced to the band by Ben Christo, Kai was brought in as the replacement guitarist for Dylan Smith with only a few days' notice.

While touring with his band Esprit D'Air, Kai was contacted by Christo regarding an opportunity to play guitar or bass for an unspecified rock band. Initially told only that a band was urgently looking for a musician in a particular style, Kai expressed interest despite his busy schedule. The following day, Christo revealed that the opportunity was with the Sisters of Mercy, and that the mention of bass was a ploy to maintain secrecy. Although the band required someone immediately, Kai agreed to join after completing his final Esprit D'Air show on October 12, 2023. With only a few days' notice, he flew to Würzburg, Germany on October 13 to perform with the band for their show on October 14, learning over 20 songs in that short span while touring with Esprit D'Air. After a couple of shows, Andrew Eldritch took Kai to one side and said, "Do you want to make this permanent?", and he said yes.

Despite his background as a progressive metal guitarist, Kai introduced a less heavy metal influence, bringing back a live sound closer to the band's earlier work. Kai also performs female-sounding vocals in the Sisters of Mercy's live performances in songs such as "Dominion", "This Corrosion", "More", and "Temple of Love", which had not been present in live performances for decades.

==== Musical contributions and reception ====
In 2024, Kai toured with the Sisters of Mercy in Europe and North America and has contributed new guitar parts for unreleased material.

After joining, Kai was credited with improving the Sisters of Mercy's live performances, with BrooklynVegan stating that "no small part of this was due to new guitarist Kai"; Louder reporting that the band's UK shows had improved, to which Andrew Eldritch responded, "The whole Kai thing worked out for us"; and The Aquarian describing the sound as "even more appealing with the addition of Kai's guitar licks". Reviewing a 2025 performance at London's Roundhouse, Post-Punk Music credited Kai's arrival with having "completely transformed the band", praising his guitar playing, backing vocals and rapport with Eldritch. Fellow guitarist Ben Christo stated that "Kai has brought so much to the band", particularly highlighting his vocal contributions and the differences they brought to the group's live performances.

In a September 2025 interview with Rolling Stone, fellow guitarist Ben Christo praised Kai's vocal abilities, stating that Kai's range had motivated him to improve his own singing. Christo also credited Kai with guiding his vocal approach towards a sound more representative of the Sisters of Mercy.

As of 2026, Kai has headlined or played shows and festivals alongside Green Day, the Damned, Iggy Pop, Queens of the Stone Age, Manic Street Preachers, Billy Talent, Palaye Royale, Keanu Reeves' Dogstar, Jane's Addiction, Pulp, the Prodigy, and more.

==== Relationship with the Sisters of Mercy and Andrew Eldritch ====
Kai has stated that they respect Andrew Eldritch's approach to independence and self-control, although their own methods differ.

“Both of us have built something on our own terms... The difference is that I push Esprit D’Air forward, actively engaging with fans and growing the project, whereas Andrew seems more content keeping things elusive.”

Eldritch later commented positively on Kai's addition to the band, stating that “the whole Kai thing worked out for us” and expressing enthusiasm about bringing them to the United States.

In 2024, Andrew Eldritch attended an Esprit D'Air concert at The Warehouse in Leeds.

=== Session and other work ===
In 2016, Kai played bass for Stereo Juggernaut and went on a UK tour supporting the Birthday Massacre, as well as shows with 3Teeth, Hed PE and Warrior Soul.

Between 2018 and 2019, Kai was a frequent guest vocalist for London-based project Shot Through the Heart, a "monthly night of live hard rock, AOR and glam metal covers" presented by Ben Christo. The live sets featured guest musicians from various rock/glam/metal groups, including Bruce Dickinson (Iron Maiden), Rainbow, Michael Schenker, Gun, Marco Mendoza, Jettblack, and Lauren Harris.

On 15 October 2022, Kai was asked to perform guitar for original Tigertailz vocalist Steevi Jaimz on a one-off show to celebrate the 35th anniversary of the Tigertailz' debut album Young and Crazy alongside Bruce Dickinson and Rachel Stamp, drummer Robin Guy and former BulletBoys bass player Rob Lane.

== Equipment and endorsements ==
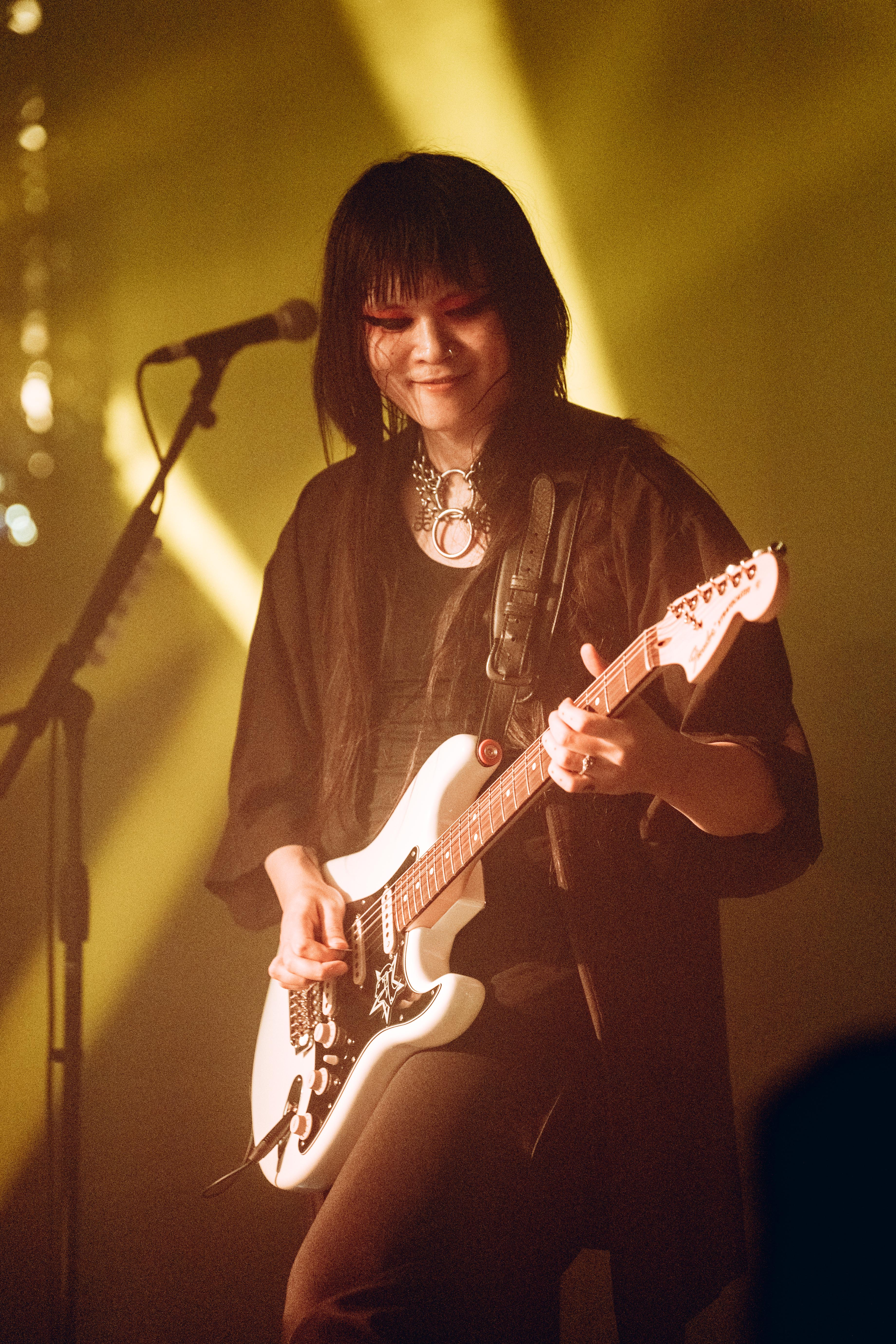
Kai performing with a white Fender American Stratocaster

Kai uses a white Ibanez S-Series electric guitar equipped with Seymour Duncan pickups, including a SCR-1n Cool Rails in the middle position and the Hot Rodded Humbucker set (JB in the bridge and Jazz in the neck). He also uses a white Fender American Stratocaster, an Ibanez YY20 (Yvette Young signature model), a Hagström Siljan II Grand Auditorium CE 12-string acoustic-electric guitar, a white Schecter Stargazer, and a blue Schecter Omen Extreme-6.

For live performances, Kai uses a Line 6 HX Stomp multi-effects processor. Their live setup includes Shure wireless systems for vocals, guitar, and in-ear monitoring. For guitar strings, Kai uses Ernie Ball products and is an endorsed artist.

Kai is also a Vocalzone endorsed artist, using the product before rehearsals, performances, and during warm-ups.

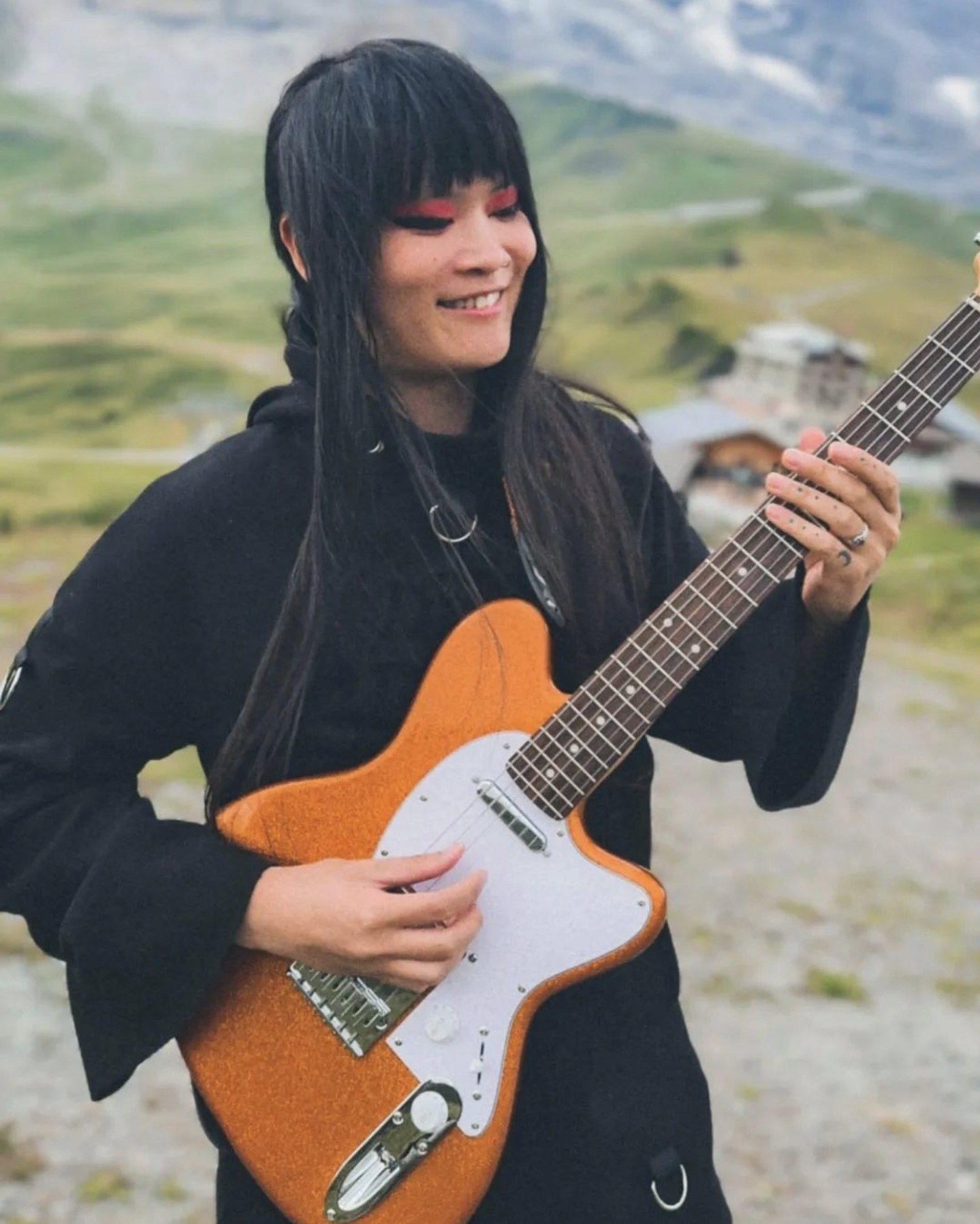
Kai using an Ibanez YY20 (Yvette Young Signature)

== Musical influences ==
As well as HYDE from L'Arc~en~Ciel, Kai has also cited Iron Maiden and other artists with "larger-than-life" presence as key inspirations during their formative years. They have expressed admiration for musicians and artists who explore creative boundaries, including Yvette Young, for her prolific output and multidisciplinary creativity.

In terms of musical taste, Kai frequently listens to post-rock bands such as Mogwai and Explosions in the Sky, as well as new wave and post-punk bands like Joy Division and the Cure. They also list the Smashing Pumpkins, the Jesus and Mary Chain, and Alice in Chains among their favourite artists. While these influences differ from the sound of Esprit D'Air, Kai credits them for shaping their approach to mood, texture, and atmosphere in songwriting.

Though not an active listener of visual kei, Kai has acknowledged the influence of bands during his upbringing. Kai named X Japan, Luna Sea, L'Arc-en-Ciel, and Dead End as some of his favorite bands from Japan in an article for Loudwire.

Kai is also inspired by the games of Final Fantasy, specifically Final Fantasy VII, and wanted to create music that sounds like it is from another world.

== Personal life ==
Kai follows a vegan diet and does not drink alcohol. He has two cats, named Zack (named after Final Fantasy VII's Zack Fair) and Pan (named after the Japanese word for bread).

Kai uses both he/him and they/them pronouns and has an androgynous appearance.

Kai currently splits his time between the United Kingdom and Japan.

=== Twitch streaming ===
Kai is a gamer who mainly plays Fortnite. As of January 2026, he live streams on his Twitch channel "EspritDAir" playing video games, singing songs, and playing guitar.

== Philanthropy ==
In March 2016, Kai performed at a charity event in London, where all proceeds went to Aoba-gakuen, an orphanage in Fukushima, Japan. Through tickets, merchandise, food sales, and donations, the event raised over £1,100 for the orphanage.

Kai supports LGBTQ+ rights and donates a percentage of record sales to Stonewall. Kai has also donated a percentage of record sales to Black Lives Matter, and Razom, a non-profit in Ukraine, to provide humanitarian assistance to the people affected by the ongoing war.

In 2024, Kai donated over $1,200 to the Palestine Children's Relief Fund to aid the humanitarian crisis facing Palestinian youths.

In 2026, Kai raised over $1,000 for Cats Protection through a charity livestream as part of the organisation's Longest Day for the Longest Stays campaign, which supports long-stay cats waiting to be rehomed.

== Other work ==
=== Kai Koffee ===
Kai created his own coffee brand called Kai Koffee with products named after Esprit D'Air song titles such as "Leviathan" and "The Awakening". Each batch is freshly roasted weekly from a carbon-neutral coffee source.

== Discography ==
=== Albums ===
List of albums, with selected chart positions
Title	Album details	Peak chart positions						
Title	Album details	UK Albums Sales	UK Album Downloads	UK Rock & Metal Albums	UK Independent Albums Breakers	UK Independent Albums	UK Physical Albums	Scottish Albums
Constellations	Released: 7 July 2017; Label: Starstorm	—	45	33	16	48	—	81
Oceans	Released: 18 February 2022; Label: Starstorm	25	5	8	5	12	80	19
Seasons	Released: 8 November 2024; Label: Starstorm	—	13	20	5	45	—	—
Aeons	Released: 7 November 2025; Label: Starstorm	29	6	1	3	12	51	—
