= Seasons (Esprit D'Air album) =

Studio album by Esprit D'Air
- Released: 8 November 2024
- Recorded: 2023–2024
- Length: 56:38
- Label: Starstorm
- Producer: Kai

Esprit D'Air chronology
Oceans (2022)	Seasons (2024)	Aeons (2025)

Singles from Seasons
- 1. "Shizuku" Released: 10 February 2023; 2. "Guiding Light (Slyder Remix)" Released: 1 September 2023; 3. "The Trooper" Released: 29 September 2023; 4. "Grudge" Released: 27 October 2023; 5. "Shizuku (Zardonic Remix)" Released: 14 June 2024; 6. "Glaciers (Orchestral Version)" Released: 12 July 2024; 7. "Aire" Released: 29 August 2024

Seasons is the third studio album by Japanese rock band Esprit D'Air. It was released on 8 November 2024 through Starstorm Records.

The album features a collection of previously unreleased works written and composed by the band's current vocalist and guitarist, Kai (then serving as guitarist), and former vocalist Yoshisuke between 2010 and 2013. It also includes covers and remixes, offering a retrospective look at the band's formative years and creative evolution.

== Commercial performance ==
Seasons peaked at number 20 on the UK Rock and Metal Albums Chart, number 13 on the UK Album Downloads Chart, and number 5 on the UK Independent Albums Breakers Chart.

== Track listing ==
Oceans track listing
No.	Title	Music	Length
1.	"Shizuku"	Kai; Yoshisuke Suga	1:45
2.	"Grudge"	Kai; Yoshisuke Suga	2:49
3.	"Reminisce" (2024 version)	Kai	4:49
4.	"Aire"	Kai; Yoshisuke Suga	2:55
5.	"As If in a dream"	Hyde; Ken	3:22
6.	"Serafine" (2024 version)	Morrie; You	3:44
7.	"Glamorous Sky"	Hyde; Ai Yazawa	2:58
8.	"Perfect World"	Kai; Yoshisuke Suga	4:24
9.	"Glaciers" (orchestral version)	Kai; John Hutchins	3:58
10.	"Guiding Light" (SlYder remix)	Kai	4:28
11.	"Aire" (acoustic version)	Kai; Yoshisuke Suga	3:45
12.	"Shizuku" (Zardonic Remix)	Kai	3:12
13.	"The Trooper" (featuring Tim "Ripper" Owens and Ben Christo)	Steve Harris	2:12

== Personnel ==
=== Production ===
- Kai – lead vocals, guitar, bass, drums, piano, production
- John Hutchins – mixing and mastering engineer (all tracks except 10 & 12)

=== Session musicians ===
- Takeshi Tokunaga – bass (tracks 5 and 13)
- Yoshisuke Suga – writer (tracks 1, 2, 4, 8, 11 and 12)
- Jan-Vincent Velazco – drums (tracks 3, 4, 5 and 13)
- Ben Christo – additional vocals and 2nd guitar solo (track 13)
- Misstiq – synthesizer (track 1)

=== Artwork ===
- Lewis-Jon Somerscales – disc and inlay innerpage artwork

=== Remixers ===
- SlYder – remix engineer (track 10)
- Zardonic – remix engineer (track 12)

== Charts ==
Chart performance for Seasons
Chart (2024)	Peak position
UK Album Downloads (OCC)	13
UK Independent Albums (OCC)	45
UK Rock & Metal Albums (OCC)	20
