= Robin Guy =

English musician (1970–2024)

- Born: June 14, 1970; England
- Died: September 8, 2024 (aged 54)
- Genres: Rock, punk rock, heavy metal, glam rock
- Occupation: Drummer
- Instruments: Drums, percussion
- Years active: 1990s–2024
- Spouse: Jessica Rush (m. 2023)

Robin Guy (14 June 1970 — 8 September 2024) was an English rock drummer known for his live performances and wide-ranging session work. He played with Rachel Stamp, Sham 69, All About Eve and others, he also substituted for Faith No More's Mike Bordin on Top of the Pops. He co-founded the band GMT alongside Bernie Tormé and John McCoy.

Guy was celebrated in tribute articles following his death from cancer in September 2024.

== Early life and education ==
Robin Guy was born on 14 June 1970 in England. He began playing drums in his early teenage years and cited discovering Iron Maiden at the age of 13 as a pivotal moment in shaping his musical direction.

Although he took a formal drum course early on, he later expressed that his performance style evolved more through experimentation and live playing rather than formal lessons. He described adopting unconventional techniques—such as animated motion behind the kit—partly in reaction against rigid teaching methods, which he felt limited his personal expression.

== Personal life ==
Guy was married to drummer Jessica Rush after eight years together, from 2023 until his death. They were married on June 11, 2023, at Bliss Chapel, in Las Vegas, Nevada.

== Career ==
=== Session and touring work ===
Robin Guy began working professionally as a drummer in the early 1990s. He performed and recorded with a number of UK and international rock bands across various genres. He was a member of the glam rock band Rachel Stamp, and also played live or recorded with acts including Sham 69, All About Eve, Bay City Rollers, Tattoo of Pain, and GMT. In addition to his work with Rachel Stamp and Sham 69, Guy also performed with bands including Violent New Breed and Ragdolls.

In 1997, Guy appeared on the BBC television programme Top of the Pops, standing in for Faith No More drummer Mike Bordin during a live mimed performance of the song "Ashes to Ashes".

In 2002, Guy performed as drummer in Bruce Dickinson's touring band during a European festival series while Iron Maiden was on hiatus. The band featured Pete Friesen (guitar) and Chris Dale (bass), and appeared at events such as Wacken Open Air.

Guy was a founding member of the band GMT, alongside former Gillan members Bernie Tormé and John McCoy, releasing the album Bitter & Twisted in 2006.

In 2010, Guy was announced as the drummer for Tigertailz for a series of live dates, succeeding Matt Blakout. He performed at festivals including Hard Rock Hell and featured on the live recording *Bezerk Live – Burnin’ Fuel*.

In October 2022, original Tigertailz vocalist Steevi Jaimz performed Young and Crazy live in full at a London concert. The band included Robin Guy on drums, guitarist Kai (Esprit D'Air), and bassist Rob Lane.

== Performance and style ==
Guy was noted for his energetic live drumming and theatrical stage presence. His live performances often incorporated showmanship techniques such as stick tricks and mid-performance standing, while maintaining traditional rock and punk drumming techniques.

== Teaching and clinics ==
Guy was also involved in music education, having taught drums at the Brighton Institute of Modern Music and delivered numerous masterclasses over the course of his career.

== Influences ==
In a 2024 interview with Pearl Drums, Guy cited Iron Maiden, The Police, and Adam & The Ants as early inspirations for their "seriously original stuff". He also praised Chad Smith (Red Hot Chili Peppers), Vinnie Paul (Pantera), and Ronald Bruner Jr. among others.

== Death and legacy ==
Guy died on 8 September 2024 of cancer, announced by his wife, Jessica Rush. Following the announcement of his death, tributes were shared across the music industry. John Robb (The Membranes) described him as "an extraordinary drummer whose power and finesse made him one of the most in demand players on the scene", particularly for his work with Rachel Stamp and All About Eve. Music critic Simon Price called him "one of those super-energetic, all-action drummers who makes every gig 20 per cent more watchable".

Singer Julianne Regan also wrote that it was "such a privilege to have known him and to have had him in the band", while fans praised him as "a tremendously talented drummer", "super showman", and "an incredible force behind that kit".
