= TVOD =

TVOD may refer to:

- TVoD, transactional video on demand
- TVöD, a grade of academic ranks in Germany
- "TVOD", a 2006 song by Tigertailz from the album Bezerk 2.0
- "T.V.O.D.", a 1978 song by the Normal
- The Vicar of Dibley, a British television sitcom
