= Aeons (Esprit D'Air album) =

Studio album by Esprit D'Air
- Released: 7 November 2025
- Recorded: 2024–2025
- Genres: Alternative metal; electronic metal; trance metal; electronicore
- Length: 35:48
- Label: Starstorm
- Producers: Kai, Takeshi Tokunaga

Esprit D'Air chronology
Seasons (2024)	Aeons (2025)

Singles from Aeons
- 1. "Lost Horizon" Released: 28 February 2025; 2. "Shadow of Time" Released: 14 March 2025; 3. "Zetsubō no Hikari" Released: 28 March 2025; 4. "Silver Leaf" Released: 18 July 2025; 5. "Chronos" Released: 19 September 2025; 6. "Broken Mirror" Released: 24 October 2025

Aeons is the fourth studio album by Japanese rock band Esprit D'Air. It was released on 7 November 2025, and described by the band as a "new dark future metal odyssey". The album debuted at #1 in the Official Rock & Metal Albums Chart.

== Background ==
Following the release of their third studio album Seasons in November 2024, Esprit D'Air announced plans for Aeons as part of their ongoing development. In advance of the album's release, the band previewed material from the record during their 2025 European tour, performing songs in the United Kingdom, Belgium, the Netherlands, Germany, Czech Republic, Poland, Hungary, Italy, Spain, and France.

=== Composition ===
The first song released from the album, "Lost Horizon", appeared on 28 February 2025. Metal Hammer featured the track in its Tracks of the Week column and described it as "sci-fi noir".

The second song, "Shadow of Time", was released on 14 March 2025.

"Zetsubō no Hikari" followed on 28 March 2025, incorporating elements of nu metal.

The fourth track released in advance of the album was "Silver Leaf", on 18 July 2025.

The fifth track released was "Chronos" on 19 September 2025, examining humanity's recurrent tendency to repeat past errors and questioning whether people can break free from destructive cycles. It was composed as a thematic reflection on how history can seem trapped on loop, and posits that change begins with individual agency.

On 24 October 2025, Esprit D'Air released "Broken Mirror", the sixth and final single before the release of Aeons. The track is described as one of the album’s heavier and darker songs, exploring themes of internal struggle, self-doubt, and breaking free from expectations.

== Musical style, influences and themes ==
Aeons incorporates a blend of alternative metal, industrial rock, electronic music, and melodic songwriting. Lyrically and conceptually, Aeons centers on the theme of time and its psychological weight. According to vocalist and producer Kai, the album explores how time "traps us, shapes us, and forces us to confront ourselves" reflecting feelings of uncertainty as well as resilience. The record contrasts darker, introspective moments with themes of renewal, framing the album as a movement between "struggle and hope, darkness and light".

== Critical reception ==
Professional ratings
Review scores
Source	Rating
Angry Metal Guy	3/5 stars
Anteverse	4.5/5 stars
Chaoszine	5/5 stars
Dead Rhetoric	4/5 stars
Distopic.it	3.5/5 stars
Metal Hammer	5/5 stars
Music Waves	5/5 stars
My Global Mind	4.5/5 stars
PowerPlay Magazine	4.5/5 stars

Aeons received positive notices from music publications. Devolution Magazine called the album "technically right on point", praising its "beautifully constructed melodies", and wrote that it "marks another step forward for one of metal's most consistent acts".

Metal Hammer highlighted the single "Chronos" as having "a touch of the symphonic... a healthy dose of power metal and even a bit of traditional Japanese instrumentation", calling it "an exhilarating sprint of a track" that "leaves lofty expectations for new album Aeons".

The singles "Chronos" and "Silver Leaf" were also voted by Metal Hammer readers as the best new metal tracks of the week.

Chaoszine gave the album five stars, praising its atmosphere, production, and songwriting, and described it as "a masterpiece from start to finish".

Dead Rhetoric gave Aeons a positive review, praising its blend of genres and cohesive flow — concluding that Aeons is "more streamlined than some previous releases" while still showcasing "a progressive and innovative spirit".

Aeons also received a favourable review from Angry Metal Guy, with the reviewer noting that the album “is built around alternative metal filtered through an anthemic, rock-oriented quality”. Overall, the review concluded that “the positives ultimately outweigh its stumbles”, describing Aeons as "an entertaining, tight bundle of melodic genre-defying goodness".

MusicWaves awarded Aeons a 5/5 rating, praising its blend of power metal, prog metal, and alternative metal influences. The review highlighted the album's strong sense of melody and emotional depth, noting the balance between darker, heavier passages and more delicate moments such as the piano sections in "Shadow of Time" and the ballad "Stardust". The critic also praised Kai's vocal performance as versatile and expressive, describing it as central to the album’s emotional impact. The publication wrote that Aeons demonstrates a stronger cohesion than the band's previous releases, calling it "a perfect blend of darkness and rage, hope and white magic", and concluding that Esprit D'Air is "a band to be reckoned with."

According to MyGlobalMind, the album explores themes such as the passage of time, recurring human mistakes, and the transformation of despair into hope.

== Commercial ==
Aeons debuted at number 1 on the UK Rock & Metal Albums Chart, number 3 on the UK Independent Album Breakers Chart, number 6 on the UK Album Downloads Chart, and number 12 on the UK Independent Albums Chart.

== Tour dates ==
Esprit D'Air announced a run of 27 live dates, beginning with a series of pre-release preview shows in March and April 2025, followed by the official post-release Aeons tour in November 2025 and February 2026.

List of concerts, showing date, city, country, venue
Date	City	Country	Venue
2025 – Europe & UK
22 March 2025	Bristol	England	Marble Factory
23 March 2025	Manchester	England	Academy 2
24 March 2025	Newcastle	England	Digital
25 March 2025	Glasgow	Scotland	The Garage
26 March 2025	London	England	Electric Ballroom
15 April 2025	Antwerp	Belgium	Kavka
16 April 2025	Cologne	Germany	Essigfabrik
17 April 2025	Hamburg	Germany	Knust
18 April 2025	Eindhoven	Netherlands	Effenaar
20 April 2025	Berlin	Germany	Columbia Theater
21 April 2025	Prague	Czech Republic	Rock Café
22 April 2025	Kraków	Poland	Klub Studio
23 April 2025	Budapest	Hungary	Barba Negra
24 April 2025	Milan	Italy	Legend Club
27 April 2025	Madrid	Spain	Sala Mon
28 April 2025	Barcelona	Spain	Razzmatazz (postponed due to power cut)
29 April 2025	Paris	France	New Morning
2025 – UK
11 November 2025	Manchester	England	Rebellion
12 November 2025	Wolverhampton	England	KK's Steel Mill
13 November 2025	Swansea	Wales	Hangar 18
14 November 2025	York	England	The Crescent
15 November 2025	Dunfermline	Scotland	PJ Molloys
18 November 2025	Barcelona	Spain	Razzmatazz
21 November 2025	London	England	229
22 November 2025	London	England	229
2026 – Ireland
26 February 2026	Dublin	Ireland	Academy Green Room
27 February 2026	Belfast	Northern Ireland	Limelight 2

== Track listing ==
Aeons track listing
No.	Title	Writer(s)	Length
1.	"Tempus"	Kai	1:05
2.	"Chronos"	Kai; Yusuke Okamoto	3:20
3.	"Shadow of Time"	Kai	3:10
4.	"Quetzalcoatl"	Kai; Yusuke Okamoto	3:57
5.	"Silver Leaf"	Takeshi Tokunaga; Yusuke Okamoto	3:55
6.	"Stardust"	Takeshi Tokunaga	4:42
7.	"Machina"	Kai	1:00
8.	"Lost Horizon"	Kai	2:23
9.	"Broken Mirror"	Kai	2:48
10.	"Zetsubō no Hikari"	Kai	2:26
11.	"Like A Phoenix"	Kai	3:37
12.	"Habatake"	Kai	3:25

== Personnel ==
Esprit D'Air

- Kai – vocals, guitar, bass, synthesizer, piano, production (all tracks except 5 & 6)
- Takeshi Tokunaga – guitar, bass, synthesizer, production (track 5 & 6)
- Jan-Vincent Velazco – drums

Additional personnel

- John Hutchins – mixing, mastering
- Lewis-Jon Somerscales – artwork

== Charts ==
Chart performance for Aeons
Chart (2025)	Peak position
UK Albums Sales (OCC)	29
UK Album Downloads (Official Charts)	6
UK Independent Albums (Official Charts)	12
UK Rock & Metal Albums (Official Charts)	1
