= Young and Crazy =

Young and Crazy may refer to:

- "Young and Crazy" an album by Tigertailz
- "Young and Crazy", instrumental from Motörhead album Iron Fist 1982
- "Young & Crazy", song by Frankie Ballard
- "Young and Crazy", single 1980 by Nikki & the Corvettes from Nikki & the Corvettes
