= Oceans (Esprit D'Air album) =

Studio album by Esprit D'Air
- Released: 18 February 2022
- Recorded: 2018–2021
- Genre: Progressive metal; electronicore; djent
- Length: 76:00
- Label: Starstorm
- Producer: Kai

Esprit D'Air chronology
| Constellations (2017) | Oceans (2022) | Seasons (2024) |

Singles from Oceans
- 1. "Calling You" Released: 11 May 2018; 2. "Serafine" Released: 31 August 2018; 3. "Amethyst" Released: 19 February 2019; 4. "Leviathan" Released: 4 December 2020; 5. "Kurenai" Released: 19 March 2021; 6. "Nebulae" Released: 30 April 2021; 7. "Glaciers" Released: 11 June 2021; 8. "Guiding Light (Reimagined)" Released: 23 July 2021; 9. "Tsunami" Released: 4 September 2021; 10. "Sōhō Raia" Released: 15 October 2021; 11. "Deai (Orchestra Mix)" Released: 26 November 2021; 12. "The Abyss" Released: 11 February 2022; 13. "Dead Zone" Released: 11 March 2022

Professional ratings
Review scores
| Source | Rating |
|---|---|
| Metal Digest | 60/100 |
| Metal Planet Music | 5/5 stars |
| MetalTalk | 5/5 stars |
| Powerplay | 10/10 |

Oceans is the second studio album by London-based Japanese rock band Esprit D'Air. It was released on 18 February 2022, through the band's own Starstorm Records with a distribution partnership with AWAL and Plastic Head Distribution. Work on the album began in 2018, but was halted due to the theft of producer and singer Kai's laptop and backups in 2019, which delayed new singles and the album releases.

Esprit D'Air completed the album in late in 2021 after successfully crowdfunding the album. Oceans is a very genre-fluid album containing various metal and rock genres with elements of electronics and piano. It was produced entirely by Kai with collaborations from session musicians and featured artists including Ben Christo from the Sisters of Mercy and Ryo Kinoshita from Crystal Lake, and Japanese vocaloid artist UmiKazeTaiyou.

== Composition ==
Critics have identified the style to be genre-fluid with various tracks ranging from djent and electronicore to power metal and post-rock. The use of digital synthesizer is prevalent in most tracks, much like their debut album Constellations.

== Singles ==
Esprit D'Air released multiple singles from the album including their most popular song 'Leviathan', which premiered on Loudwire, as well as songs such as "The Abyss" featuring Ryo Kinoshita from Crystal Lake, and "Dead Zone" featuring Ben Christo from The Sisters of Mercy.

== Reception ==
=== Critical ===
The release of 'Leviathan' garnered some praise from peers with The Sisters of Mercy's Ben Christo stating of the song, "It's a really unique blend of djent, industrial, electro, goth, emo, metal and much more. I love the dramatics and cinematic quality it has, with haunting, melancholy colors swooping betwixt the cruel, relentless jaws of the machine." Michael Falcore of The Birthday Massacre stated that 'Leviathan' is a "wonderful song, feels like a modern day opera with heavy guitars set on fire! Melancholic and haunting, the vocals cut deep. A truly inspired song."

About the track, 'Dead Zone', Richard Shaw, the guitarist of Cradle of Filth stated, "Catchy and atmospheric, with incredible vocals and an otherworldly guitar solo. What a song!".

PowerPlay Magazine gave Oceans a 10/10 review, and a live review, citing that "In the 25 years that I've been publishing Powerplay and of the thousands of bands that I've seen play live, this rated as one of the most crushingly intense shows that I've ever experienced".

=== Radio coverage ===
Both 'Calling You' and 'Amethyst' were played on BBC Radio's F.N.A.T. show.

'Leviathan' was played on BBC Radio 1's Future Alternative show with Nels Hylton and Kerrang! Radio's Fresh Blood with Alex Baker. About 'Leviathan', Nels Hylton states, "Gargantuan, taking electronic-sounding elements and just layering it over some of the best guitar riffs I’ve heard in a minute.", whilst Alex Baker states, "Showcases how these guys have the ability to mix up so many flavors. It's proggy, cinematic, it's synthy, it's a bit DragonForce-y at times, a bit metal-y, but all the time, it's bloody great."

Ollie Winiberg (BBC Radio 1) also stated, "One of the most phenomenal guitar players I have seen in years, going by the name of Esprit D'Air." on his Heavy Hooks podcast.

'The Abyss' was played on TotalRock and Midlands Metalheads Radio.

Matthew Kiichi Heafy of Trivium played 'Leviathan' as an opening track on his Chaos Hour show on SiriusXM.

=== Commercial ===
Despite not being on a major record label and releasing independently, "Oceans" peaked at number 8 on the UK Rock and Metal Albums Chart, and number 5 on the UK Independent Albums Chart and has re-entered and stayed in the Official Charts for several weeks in 2022. It was their first album to reach the UK charts.

== Tour dates ==
Esprit D'Air announced an extensive string of 34 tour dates to perform songs from the Oceans album, including an album launch party at the O2 Academy Islington, London.

List of concerts, showing date, city, country, venue
| Date | City | Country | Venue |
British Isles
| 20 February 2022 | London | England | O2 Academy Islington |
| 30 July 2022 | London | England | The Underworld |
| 31 July 2022 | Newcastle upon Tyne | England | The Cluny 2 |
| 1 August 2022 | Glasgow | Scotland | The Garage (G2) |
| 2 August 2022 | Manchester | England | Rebellion |
| 17 February 2023 | Cardiff | Wales | The Globe |
| 19 February 2023 | York | England | The Fulford Arms |
| 20 February 2023 | Newcastle upon Tyne | England | The Cluny |
| 21 February 2023 | Edinburgh | Scotland | La Belle Angèle |
| 22 February 2023 | Manchester | England | Manchester Academy 3 |
| 23 February 2023 | Birmingham | England | O2 Academy3 Birmingham |
| 25 February 2023 | London | England | The Black Heart (Patreon-only show) |
Europe
| 8 October 2023 | Kraków | Poland | Klub Zaścianek |
| 10 October 2023 | Budapest | Hungary | Dürer Kert |
| 12 October 2023 | Barcelona | Spain | La Nau |
British Isles
| 12 February 2024 | Bournemouth | England | The Old Fire Station |
| 13 February 2024 | Exeter | England | Exeter Phoenix |
| 14 February 2024 | Bristol | England | Thekla |
| 16 February 2024 | Swansea | Wales | Hangar 18 |
| 18 February 2024 | Wolverhampton | England | KK's Steel Mill |
| 19 February 2024 | Sheffield | England | Corporation |
| 20 February 2024 | Manchester | England | Manchester Academy 3 |
| 21 February 2024 | Liverpool | England | O2 Academy Liverpool |
| 23 February 2024 | Dublin | Ireland | The Grand Social |
| 24 February 2024 | Belfast | Northern Ireland | Oh Yeah Music Centre |
| 26 February 2024 | Leeds | England | The Warehouse |
| 27 February 2024 | Glasgow | Scotland | The Garage |
| 28 February 2024 | Newcastle upon Tyne | England | Northumbria University Students' Union |
| 29 February 2024 | Nottingham | England | Rescue Rooms |
| 2 March 2024 | London | England | The Garage |
Europe
| 29 March 2024 | Heerlen | Netherlands | Poppodium Nieuwe Nor |
| 30 March 2024 | Hamburg | Germany | Headcrash |
| 31 March 2024 | Cologne | Germany | MTC |
| 1 April 2024 | Antwerp | Belgium | Kavka Oudaan |

== Track listing ==
Oceans track listing
| No. | Title | Music | Length |
|---|---|---|---|
| 1. | "Into the Oceans" | Kai | 1:45 |
| 2. | "Tsunami (津波)" | Kai; Ryoma Takahashi | 2:49 |
| 3. | "Leviathan" | Kai | 4:49 |
| 4. | "Ocean's Call" | Kai; Yusuke Okamoto | 2:55 |
| 5. | "The Abyss" (featuring Ryo Kinoshita) | Kai; Ryo Kinoshita | 3:22 |
| 6. | "Dead Zone" (featuring Ben Christo) | Kai; Ben Christo | 3:44 |
| 7. | "Nebulae" | Kai | 2:58 |
| 8. | "Amethyst" (album version) | Kai | 4:24 |
| 9. | "Sōhō Raia (双方ライアー)" | Kai; UmiKazeTaiyou | 3:58 |
| 10. | "Sazanami (漣)" | Kai; Takeshi Tokunaga | 4:28 |
| 11. | "Guiding Light (Reimagined)" | Kai | 3:45 |
| 12. | "Calling You" | Kai | 3:12 |
| 13. | "Distant Waves" | Kai | 2:12 |
| 14. | "Glaciers" | Kai; Ryoma Takahashi | 5:52 |
| 15. | "Moonlight Tides" | Kai | 2:09 |
| 16. | "Deai (出逢い)" (orchestra mix) | Kai; Yoshisuke Suga; Tatsuya Nashimoto | 5:50 |
| 17. | "Leviathan" (Heavygrinder Remix) | Kai | 4:16 |
| 18. | "Kurenai (紅)" | Yoshiki | 4:16 |
| 19. | "Serafine" | Morrie; You | 5:24 |
| 20. | "Leviathan" (Shirobon Remix) | Kai | 3:51 |

== Personnel ==
=== Production ===
- Kai – lead vocals, guitar, bass, drums, piano, synthesizer, production, programming, recording engineer, art direction and typography
- Paul Visser – mixing and mastering engineer (all tracks except 1, 12, 13, 15, 17, 19 and 20)

=== Session musicians ===
- Ryoma Takahashi – co-producer and writer (tracks 2 and 14)
- Yusuke Okamoto – co-producer and writer (track 4)
- UmiKazeTaiyou – co-producer and writer (track 9)
- Takeshi Tokunaga – co-producer and writer (track 10), bass (tracks 3, 10 and 14)
- Yoshisuke Suga – writer (track 16)
- Tatsuya Nashimoto – producer (track 16)
- Jan-Vincent Velazco – drums (track 14 and 18)
- Sougo Akiyoshi – drums (track 7 and 8)
- Ryo Kinoshita – additional vocals and lyrics (track 5)
- Ben Christo – additional vocals and lyrics (track 6)

=== Artwork ===
- Lewis-Jon Somerscales – disc and inlay innerpage artwork
- Alex Kie – photographer

=== Remixers ===
- Heavygrinder – remix engineer (track 17)
- Shirobon – remix engineer (track 20)

== Charts ==
Chart performance for Oceans
| Chart (2022–2024) | Peak position |
|---|---|
| Scottish Albums (OCC) | 19 |
| UK Album Downloads (OCC) | 5 |
| UK Independent Albums (OCC) | 12 |
| UK Rock & Metal Albums (OCC) | 8 |
