= Banzai! (album) =

Studio album by Tigertailz
- Released: 1991
- Recorded: 1991
- Studio: Loco Studios (Usk), The Coach House (Bristol), Molez (Bath); track 4 recorded on the "Banzai!" tour
- Genre: Glam metal
- Producer: Thighpaulsandra

Tigertailz chronology
Bezerk (1990)	Banzai! (1991)	Wazbones (1995)

Banzai! is the third studio album by Tigertailz. It is a collection of B sides and singles originally for Japan only. It includes a remake version of "Livin' without you", and a live version of "She'z too hot" from their first album Young and Crazy, and two covers: "Creeping Death" by Metallica and "Peace Sells" by Megadeth which hint at the direction they would take for the next album.

== Track listing ==
1. "Murderess"
2. "Livin' Without You"
3. "Million Dollar Smile"
4. "She's Too Hot (Live)"
5. "Creeping Death" (Metallica Cover)
6. "Nine Livez"
7. "Peace Sellz" (Megadeth Cover)
8. "For a Few Dollarz More"
9. "Taking the Pain"

== Personnel ==
- Kim Hooker - vocals
- Jay Pepper - guitars
- Pepsi Tate - bass
- Ace Finchum - drums
