= Bezerk 2.0 =

Studio album by Tigertailz
- Released: 23 June 2006
- Genre: Glam metal
- Length: 48:53
- Label: Demolition Records
- Producer: Thighpaulsandra

Tigertailz chronology
Wazbones (1995)	Bezerk 2.0 (2006)	Thrill Pistol (2007)

Bezerk 2.0 is a 2006 album by Welsh glam metal band Tigertailz, released on Demolition Records. It is seen as a follow-up to the original album Bezerk released on Music For Nations in 1990. It goes back to the more pop metal sound the band had at the time rather than the heavier sound they used on albums such as Banzai! and Wazbones. The album features similar artwork to the original Bezerk album.

== Track listing ==
1. "Bezerk" (Instrumental) - 1:26
2. "Do It Up" - 3:33
3. "One Beat of Your Heart" - 4:05
4. "I Believe" - 5:25
5. "TVOD" - 3:30
6. "Falling Down" - 3:49
7. "Make Me Bleed" - 5:49
8. "Get Real" - 3:22
9. "Annie'z Gone" - 4:35
10. "For Hate'z Sake" - 5:37
11. "Sugar Fever" - 3:24
12. "Dirty Needlez" - 4:13
13. "Interview" (Bonus track)
