= Bezerk (album) =

Studio album by Tigertailz
- Released: 1990
- Recorded: Great Linford Manor, Milton Keynes, Battery Studios, London and Loco Studios, Wales
- Genre: Glam metal
- Length: 42:14
- Label: Music for Nations
- Producer: Chris Tsangarides

Tigertailz chronology
Young and Crazy (1987)	Bezerk (1990)	Banzai! (1991)

Singles from Bezerk
- 1. "Noise Level Critical" Released: 1990; 2. "Heaven" Released: 1990; 3. "Love Bomb Baby" Released: 1990

Bezerk is the second studio album by Welsh glam metal band Tigertailz. It was released on the Music for Nations record label and is still the band's most successful and well known album, having reached the UK top 40 at number 36. It is the first album to feature new lead vocalist Kim Hooker. The album takes a strongly pop influenced approach to the genre, typical of Tigertailz's sound.

In 2006 Tigertailz released a new album called Bezerk 2.0 which featured similar album art to the original release.

To celebrate the albums 20th anniversary Tigertailz performed the entire album in 2013 at Fuel Rock Club, Cardiff.

== Track listing ==
All tracks composed by Ace Finchum, Jay Pepper, Kim Hooker and Pepsi Tate

Side one

1. "Sick Sex" - 4:26
2. "Love Bomb Baby" - 3:03
3. "I Can Fight Dirty Too" - 3:50
4. "Noise Level Critical" - 5:23
5. "Heaven" - 6:04

Side two

1. "Love Overload" - 3:52
2. "Action City" - 4:02
3. "Twist and Shake" - 3:32
4. "Squeeze It Dry" - 4:04
5. "Call of the Wild" - 3:58

== Personnel ==
=== Tigertailz ===
- Kim Hooker - vocals
- Jay Pepper - guitar, mandolin
- Pepsi Tate - bass
- Ace Finchum - drums

=== Additional musicians ===
- Don Airey - keyboards, strings arrangements
- Tim Lewis - additional keyboards
- Glen Thompson - additional percussion
- Peter Goalby, John Blood - backing vocals
- London SSO - strings

=== Production ===
- Chris Tsangarides - producer, engineer
- Gordon Bonnar, Nick Blundell, Tim Lewis - engineers
