= Leviathan (Esprit D'Air song) =

Single by Esprit D'Air

from the album Oceans
- Released: December 4, 2020
- Recorded: 2020
- Genre: Gothic metal, electronicore, alternative metal, nu metal, industrial metal, metalcore
- Length: 4:49
- Label: Starstorm Records
- Songwriter: Kai
- Producer: Kai

Esprit D'Air singles chronology
| "Shizuku" (2012) | "Leviathan" (2020) |

"Leviathan" is a song by Japanese electronicore band Esprit D'Air, released on December 4, 2020, as a single from the Oceans album.

Leviathan was recorded during the pandemic in 2020. The song was producer and songwriter Kai's favorite song on the album, as he said when the album was released.

== Background and composition ==
It is the third track of the album, containing djent guitar riffs with melodic vocals and futuristic synthesizers layered on top.

== Chart performance ==
The single entered the Official Charts, peaking at #4 in the Physical Singles Chart, #10 in the Single Downloads Chart, #9 in the Single Sales Chart, and #10 in Singles Vinyl Chart.

== Lyrical meaning ==
The song, as Kai explained, "we interpreted 'Leviathan' as a huge power or impact beyond human power or knowledge. When we wrote this, we were thinking about how significantly our world has changed with the pandemic and how we can think positively and have hopes in tough times. Through our composition and songwriting, we tried to express lights of despair, human weakness and stupidity, and human wisdom to build a new world.

== Music videos ==
The song has two versions of music videos, both directed by Andy Mihov. The video tells the story of a post-apocalyptic world, ravaged by pandemics, where an AI seeks to break free from her abusive creator and help humankind. The second version of the music video, "Leviathan 2.0: Enhanced Edition", contained new visual effects.

The video went on to achieve multiple awards and nominations from Paris Film Awards, Boden International Film Festival, Experimental Film and Music Video Festival and more.

== Remixes ==
The track was remixed by Heavygrinder and Shirobon.

== Reception ==
Loudwire premiered the music video on their website and listed 'Leviathan' in their '2022's Best Metal Songs' playlist on Spotify.

The song received praise from Ben Christo from The Sisters of Mercy, stating "It's a really unique blend of djent, industrial, electro, goth, emo, metal and much more. I love the dramatics and cinematic quality it has, with haunting, melancholy colors swooping betwixt the cruel, relentless jaws of the machine.", whilst Michael Falcore of The Birthday Massacre adds, "Wonderful song, feels like a modern day opera with heavy guitars set on fire! Melancholic and haunting, the vocals cut deep. A truly inspired song."

'Leviathan' was played on BBC Radio 1's Future Alternative show with Nels Hylton and Kerrang! Radio's Fresh Blood with Alex Baker. About 'Leviathan', Nels Hylton states, "Gargantuan, taking electronic-sounding elements and just layering it over some of the best guitar riffs I’ve heard in a minute.", whilst Alex Baker states, "Showcases how these guys have the ability to mix up so many flavors. It's proggy, cinematic, it's synthy, it's a bit DragonForce-y at times, a bit metal-y, but all the time, it's bloody great."

Whilst playing Leviathan, Ollie Winiberg (BBC Radio 1) also stated, "One of the most phenomenal guitar players I have seen in years, going by the name of Esprit D'Air." on his Heavy Hooks podcast.

Matthew Kiichi Heafy of Trivium played "Leviathan" as an opening track on his Chaos Hour show on SiriusXM.

== Track listing ==
=== Leviathan ===
| No. | Title | Length |
|---|---|---|
| 1. | "Leviathan" | 4:49 |
| 2. | "Leviathan (HEAVYGRINDER Remix)" | 4:16 |
| 3. | "Leviathan (Shirobon Remix)" | 3:51 |

=== Leviathan (Special Edition) ===
Available on CD, cassette and vinyl.

| No. | Title | Length |
|---|---|---|
| 1. | "Leviathan" | 4:49 |
| 2. | "Leviathan (HEAVYGRINDER Remix)" | 4:16 |
| 3. | "Leviathan (Shirobon Remix)" | 3:51 |
| 4. | "Leviathan (Acoustic Version)" | 3:36 |

== Charts ==
Chart performance of "Leviathan"
| Chart | Peak position |
|---|---|
| UK Singles Sales Chart | 9 |
| UK Singles Downloads Chart | 10 |
| Official Physical Singles Chart | 4 |
| Official Vinyl Singles Chart | 10 |

== Personnel ==
Production

- Kai – lead vocals, guitar, drums, backing vocals, synthesizer, composition, songwriting
- Takeshi Tokunaga – bass

Mix and mastering

- Paul Visser at The Recording Studio London

=== Music videos ===
- Leviathan (2020)
- Leviathan 2.0 (Enhanced Edition) (2022)

== Awards and nominations ==
=== Boden International Film Festival ===
The Boden International Film Festival showcases documentaries and shorts from around the world.

| Year | Nominee / work | Award | Result | Ref. |
|---|---|---|---|---|
| 2022 | Leviathan 2.0 | Best Music Video | Won | |

=== Experimental Film and Music Video Festival ===
The Experimental Film and Music Video Festival runs every three months at the Carlton Cinemas in downtown Toronto, Canada.

| Year | Nominee / work | Award | Result | Ref. |
|---|---|---|---|---|
| 2022 | Leviathan 2.0 | Best Cinematography | Won | |

=== Music Video Awards ===
A competition festival exclusively focused on music videos, music, dance films, and animated music videos.

| Year | Nominee / work | Award | Result | Ref. |
|---|---|---|---|---|
| 2022 | Leviathan 2.0 (Enhanced Edition) | Best Low Budget | Nominated | |

=== Music Video Underground ===
A competition festival exclusively focused on music videos, music, dance films, and animated music videos.

| Year | Nominee / work | Award | Result | Ref. |
|---|---|---|---|---|
| 2022 | Leviathan 2.0 | Best Music Video | Nominated | |

=== Paris Film Awards ===
IMDb qualifier's Paris Film Awards is a monthly international film festival. A selection of short films are screened every month in Paris.

| Year | Nominee / work | Award | Result | Ref. |
|---|---|---|---|---|
| 2022 | Leviathan 2.0 (Enhanced Edition) | Best Music Video | Won | |
| 2022 | Leviathan 2.0 (Enhanced Edition) | Best Director | Won | |
