= Wazbones =

Studio album by Tigertailz
- Released: 1995
- Recorded: 1994–1995
- Genres: Thrash metal, glam metal
- Producer: Thighpaulsandra

Tigertailz chronology
Banzai! (1991)	Wazbones (1995)	Bezerk 2.0 (2006)

Singles from Wazbones
- 1. "Belly of the Beast" Released: 1995

Wazbones is a 1995 album by Tigertailz. Originally recorded in 1992, with line-up consisting in Kim Hooker (vocals), Pepsi Tate (bass), Jay Pepper (guitar) and Andy Skinner (drums), replacing Ace Finchum. They were signed to Amuse America, but the company dropped them. Pepper left, being replaced by Cy Danaher. The band continued but they changed their name to Wazbones, and re-recorded the original album.

The sound is a drastic change to their previous work, dealing with some kind of mid-tempo Thrash metal, but in the vein of their previous work with power ballads, and for moments emulating Slayer.

== Track listing ==
1. "Tyfho"
2. "Dirty Needles"
3. "Belly of the Beast"
4. "Pigface"
5. "Love Junkie"
6. "Make Me Bleed"
7. "Perish"
8. "Let Your Flesh Instruct Your Mind"
9. "Love Can Kill"
10. "In the Name of the Gun"
11. "Wazbones"
12. "I Believe"
13. "Show Me"
14. "Tyfho (version #1)"
15. "The Final Solution"

== Personnel ==
- Kim Hooker - vocals
- Cy Danaher - guitars
- Pepsi Tate - bass
- Andy Skinner - drums
