= Constellations (Esprit D'Air album) =

Studio album by Esprit D'Air
- Released: June 30, 2017
- Recorded: 2016–2017
- Length: 51:03
- Label: Starstorm
- Producer: Kai

Esprit D'Air chronology
Constellations (2017)	Oceans (2022)

Singles from Constellations
- 1. "Rebirth" Released: December 14, 2016; 2. "Guiding Light" Released: April 14, 2017; 3. "Ignition" Released: August 18, 2017; 4. "Starstorm" Released: January 26, 2018

Professional ratings
Review scores
Source	Rating
HuffPost	5/5 stars
Powerplay	7/10
Rock Sins	8.5/10

Constellations is the debut studio album by British-Japanese metal band Esprit D'Air.

== Background ==
The digital album was released on June 30, 2017, and the physical version was released on July 7, 2017, through the band's own label, Starstorm Records.

== Singles ==
Esprit D'Air released four singles from the album—"Rebirth", "Guiding Light", "Ignition", and "Starstorm"—with accompanying music videos for each. A reimagined version of "Guiding Light" was later released in 2021.

== Accolades ==
In 2018, Constellations was awarded Best Metal Album at the Independent Music Awards, judged by Slayer, Amy Lee of Evanescence, and Sepultura. The award was presented at the Lincoln Center for the Performing Arts, New York.

Teamrock.com featured "Guiding Light" as one of the Best 50 Rock Songs of 2017.

== Track listing ==
No.	Title	Music	Length
1.	"Ignition"	Kai	4:03
2.	"Rebirth"	Kai; Daishi	5:12
3.	"Guiding Light"	Kai	3:49
4.	"The Hunter"	Kai; Daishi; Yoshisuke Suga	6:10
5.	"Starstorm"	Kai	3:38
6.	"The Awakening"	Kai; Ellis; Yoshisuke Suga	3:55
7.	"Reminisce"	Kai	4:46
8.	"Versus"	Kai	5:14

Constellations: CD exclusive bonus tracks
No.	Title	Music	Length
9.	"Shizuku" (雫; "Teardrop")	Kai; Yoshisuke Suga	4:07
10.	"Grudge"	Kai; Ellis; Yoshisuke Suga	4:21
11.	"Deai" (出逢い; "Encounter")	Kai; Yoshisuke Suga; Tatsuya Nashimoto	5:48

== Personnel ==
- Kai – lead vocals, guitar, bass, keyboards, drums, production, programming, mixing & mastering
- Ellis – bass ("Rebirth", "Guiding Light", "Reminisce")
- Daishi – drums ("Rebirth", "The Hunter", "Versus")
- Koichi Shoji – recording engineering ("Rebirth", "Guiding Light", "Reminisce")
- Yoshisuke Suga – lyric writing ("The Hunter", "The Awakening")
- Shutaro Tsujimoto – production
- Choizilla – artwork

== Charts ==
Chart performance for Constellations
Chart (2023)	Peak position
Scottish Albums (OCC)	81
UK Album Downloads (OCC)	45
UK Independent Albums (OCC)	48
UK Rock & Metal Albums (OCC)	33
