= DJ Heavygrinder =

American model and DJ

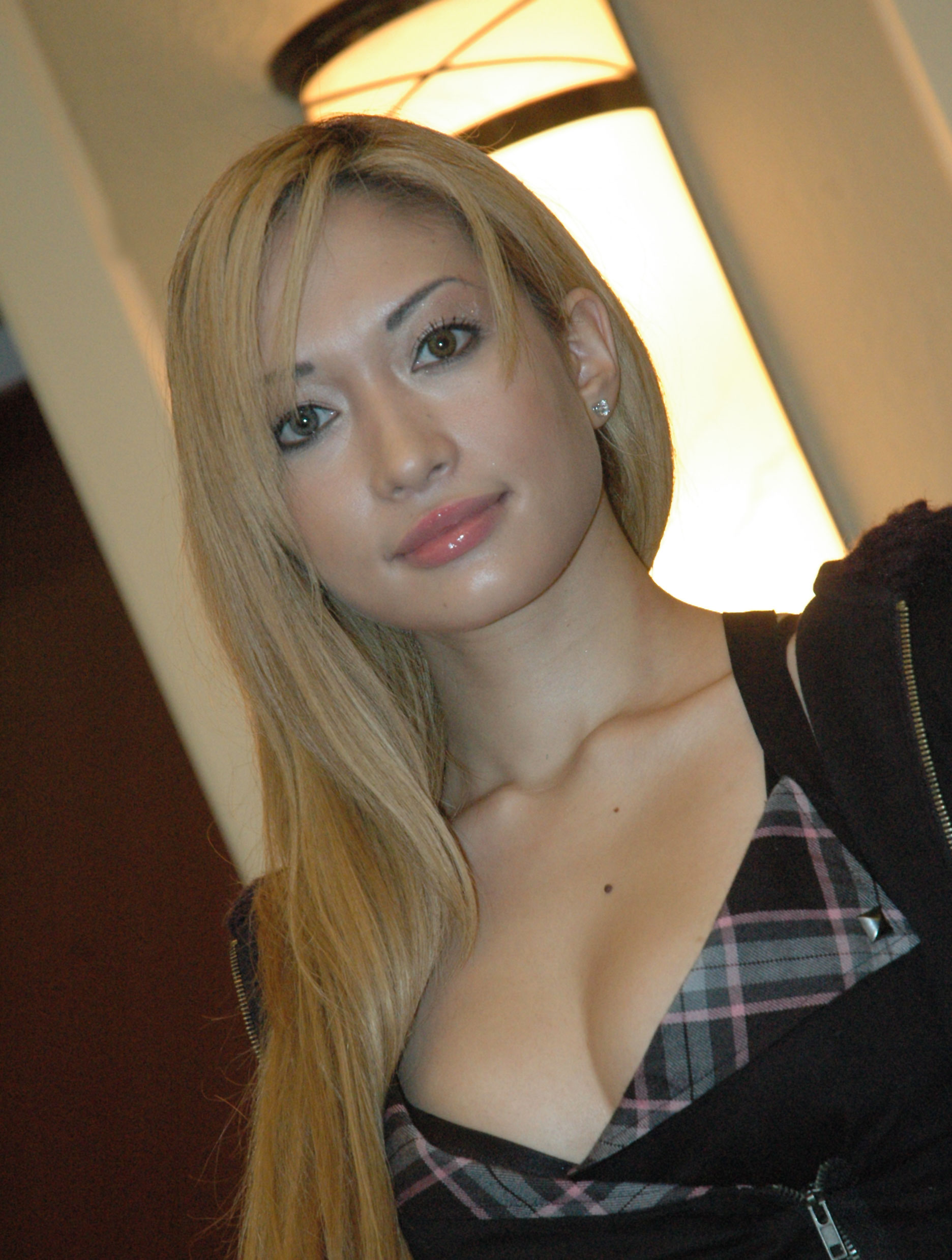
- DJ Heavygrinder at the 2008 Florida Supercon.

Background information
- Also known as: DJ Heavygrinder, Bobbie HG Mervelle, Marie Vaunt
- Born: Bobbie Merveille; 1983 (age 42–43); Seattle, Washington, U.S.
- Origin: Los Angeles, California, U.S.
- Genres: Electronic; drum and bass; dubstep; electro house; indie; trance
- Occupation: Disc jockey
- Instruments: Turntables, sampler, mixer
- Years active: 2000–present
- Labels: BugEyed Records, Kurai Records
- Website: Official website

Bobbie Merveille (born 1983) better known by her stage names DJ Heavygrinder and Marie Vaunt is an American disc jockey.

== Biography ==
Merveille was born in Seattle, Washington to a French father and a Japanese mother. She was raised in Japan's Kanagawa Prefecture, where she lived until the age of 14. While in her teens, her parents decided that she would receive education in the United States. She soon got involved in the art of DJing after returning to the US.

The genres of music she plays are house, electronica, indie, and trance. Her musical mentors and strongest influences include Cannibal Corpse, Pantera, Deicide, Justice, Gackt, L'Arc-en-Ciel, The Prodigy, Jamiroquai, Ryuichi Sakamoto, and Daft Punk.

Although she worked as an actress during her years in Japan, she has very little or no interest in acting.

DJ Heavygrinder also performed at AnimeMatsuri in Houston, Texas in March 2011, as well as March 2014.

Merveille began performing as Marie Vaunt in 2018

== Discography ==
=== Albums ===
- Eternity (2008)

=== EPs ===
- Setsuna (2016)
- Shadow Chaser (2013)

=== Singles ===
- Sway (2012)
- Lovesick Hypocrite (2013)
- Disguise (2013)
- Superstar (2013)
- The Riot (2013)
- Warning Destruction (2014)
- Black Is A Color (2014)
- Save You (2014)
- Break Free (2016)

=== Collaborations & remixes ===
Year	Song	Album	Album artist
2014	"1Up"; HEAVYGRINDER Remix	Level Up (EP)	FUTR3
2015	"Cutie Mark Crusaders"; HEAVYGRINDER Remix	Friendship is Magic Remixed	Various Artists
2016	"BAD BOY" -GARNiDELiA vs HEAVYGRINDER-	Violet Cry	GARNiDELiA
2017	"Twizted"; HEAVYGRINDER Remix	Twizted (Remixes)	DJ BL3ND
2018	"Poppin'Trip" -GARNiDELiA vs HEAVYGRINDER-	G.R.N.D.	GARNiDELiA
2020	"Leviathan"; HEAVYGRINDER Remix	Leviathan (Single)	Esprit D'Air
2022	"Leviathan"; HEAVYGRINDER Remix	Oceans	Esprit D'Air

== Personal life ==
She currently resides in Los Angeles, California and is married to fellow producer and DJ, Katfyr.
