= Jan-Vincent Velazco =

British drummer, session musician and composer

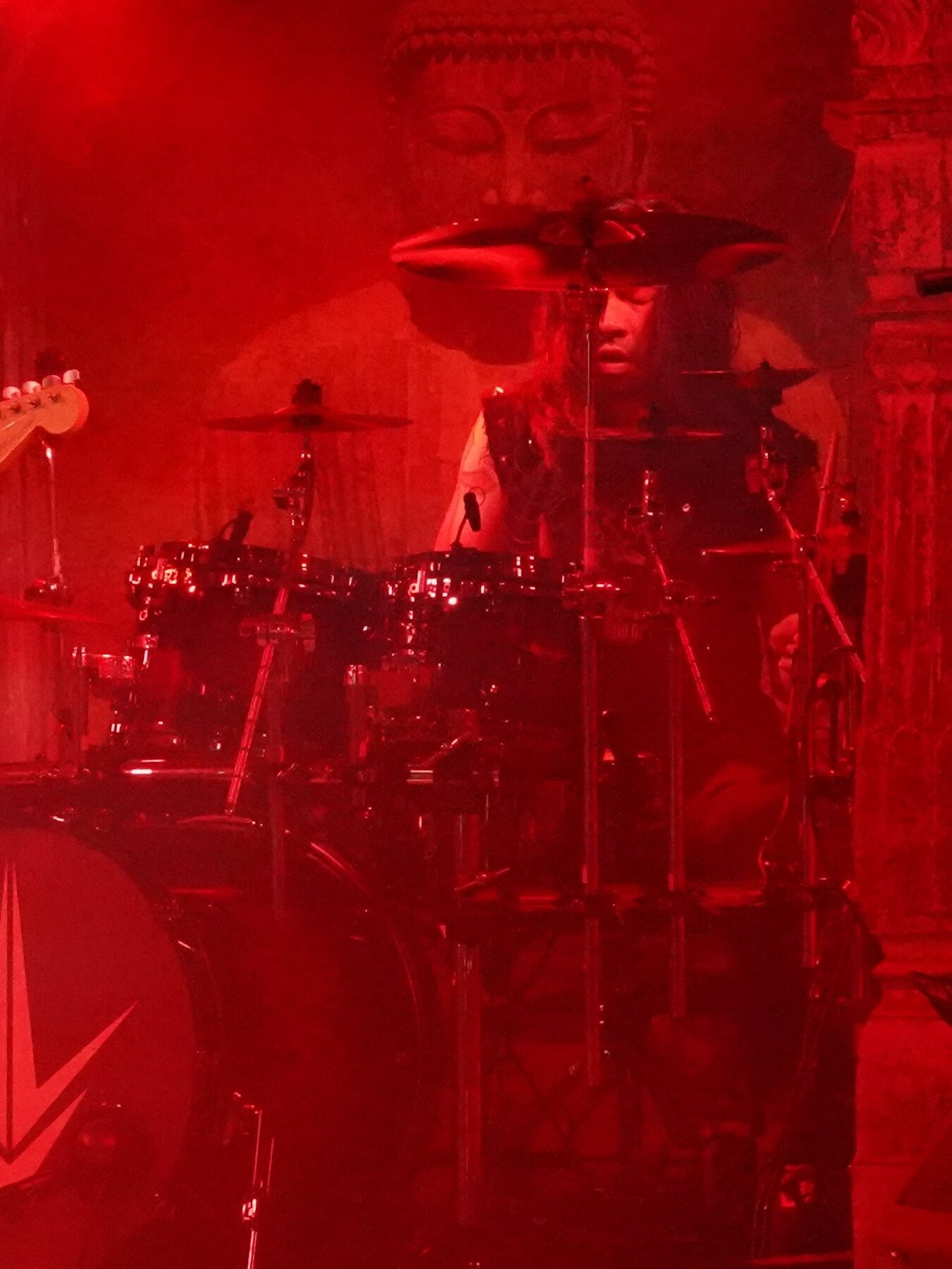

Background information
- Born: Jan-Vincent Velazco; Philippines
- Genres: Rock, progressive rock, alternative metal
- Occupations: Musician, Session drummer
- Instruments: Drums, percussion
- Years active: 2004–present
- Website: Official website

Jan-Vincent Velazco is a UK-based session rock musician and composer. He is a current member of Pendragon after the recommendation of Craig Blundell, drummer for Steven Wilson and Frost*. He also plays with Raymond Watts of PIG, Esprit D'Air, Diamond Black and previously with Control. In 2017, it was reported that Velazco joined the Swedish metal band, Ghost, as one of the Nameless Ghouls (Earth). It is not known when he exited the band.

== Early life ==
Velazco began playing drums at a young age. Initially self-taught, he later studied at the Yamaha Music Foundation while playing in several bands. He later moved to Guildford, UK, to study at (ACM) Academy of Contemporary Music, before relocating to London the following year.

== Pendragon ==
In July 2015, Pendragon were scheduled to perform at Night of the Prog in Germany and Ramblin' Man Fair United Kingdom together with acts like Neal Morse and Scorpions but due to commitments for the Steven Wilson tour, Craig Blundell was unable to appear with the band so recommended Vincent to stand in for him for these 2 shows.

Later that year, both Pendragon and Craig decided that Velazco would become the new permanent drummer for the band and in 2016 they announced a string of European headline shows in Germany, France, Netherlands, Switzerland, Italy, Austria, Poland, Belgium and the UK with support from John Young of Lifesigns/Bonnie Tyler.

They also recorded their live DVD from Katowice, Poland and an interview from Metal Mind Productions.

Whilst in Pendragon, Velazco has played alongside Dream Theater, Marillion, Scorpions, Pain of Salvation, Steve Hackett, Blue Öyster Cult, Saxon, FM, Anathema, Gregg Allman and Camel and has also toured Europe, Japan and North America.

In 2018, Velazco recorded the albums Men Who Climb Mountains and The World as part of Pendragon's fortieth anniversary booklet which included a live CD from their sold out European tour.

In 2019 Pendragon went back to the studio and recorded “Love Over Fear” which is the band’s most recent album. It became Amazon’s best selling album for a week, spent 3 months at the Official Progressive Charts and number 4 in the 2020 Prog Reader’s Poll.

== Sessions and other work ==
In 2016, Velazco started touring with Esprit D'Air (fronted by Kai from the Sisters of Mercy), and has been their touring drummer since. In 2021, Velazco recorded drums for their single, 'Glaciers', which ended up in their charting album Oceans. In 2025, he recorded the drums on the album Aeons. It debuted at number 1 on the UK Rock & Metal Albums Chart, number 3 on the UK Independent Album Breakers Chart, number 6 on the UK Album Downloads Chart, and number 12 on the UK Independent Albums Chart.

In 2018, Velazco went on tour with Industrial rock musician Raymond Watts (Pig) in the U.S. supporting Killing Joke as part of their fortieth anniversary world tour. They performed the newly released album "Risen" plus some classics like "Juke Joint Jezebel" which was KMFDM’s biggest hit and was featured on films Bad Boys, and Mortal Kombat (1995) soundtrack.

This was followed by a UK tour in 2020 supporting the Los Angeles-based band 3Teeth.

In April 2019, Velazco was invited by Chris Dale to perform a special show in Sarajevo, Bosnia, commemorating 25 years since Bruce Dickinson’s band, Skunkworks (featuring Dale on bass), had played there during the war (as documented in the award-winning movie "Scream for me Sarajevo"). The show was a sell-out success, filmed for national television and with Dickinson himself in attendance.

In 2020, Velazco collaborated with Steve Rothery of Marillion and Gabriel Agudo to record the full length album New Life.

In 2021, it was announced that Velazco recorded the drums for world renowned guitar virtuoso and former Ozzy Osbourne guitarist and Firewind founder, Gus G. The album, “Quantum Leap”, was released via AFM Records and also features Dennis Ward on bass. It received commercial success reaching number 7 on Greece’s Official Album Charts, number 4 on the U.S. iTunes Charts, number 26 on the U.S. Hard Music Charts and landed number 2 in Guitar World’s “Best Guitar Albums of 2021”.

== Endorsements ==
Velazco uses and officially endorses Pearl Drums, Sabian, D’Addario (Evans Drumheads and Promark), Audix Microphones, Czarcie Kopyto Pedals, Protection Racket, Porter & Davies and Drumtacs.

== Discography ==
=== Pendragon ===
Albums

- Masquerade 20 Live (2017)
- The First 40 Year (2019)
- Love Over Fear (2020)
- Men Who Climb Mountains, Remixed (2022)
- North Star (2023)

DVDs

- Masquerade 20 Live DVD (2017)

=== Gus G ===
Albums

- Quantum Leap (2021)

=== Gypsy Pistoleros ===
Albums

- The Mescalito Vampires (2021)

=== Gabriel ===
Albums

- New Life (2020)

=== Esprit D'Air ===
Singles

- Glaciers (2021)

Albums

- Oceans (2022)
- Live in Barcelona (2024)

=== Lannon ===
Singles

- Heaven's Gate (2020)

=== Leo Carnicella ===
EP

- Until a New Dawn (2020)

Album

- Super~Sargasso Sea (2022)
