= Young and Crazy (album) =

Studio album by Tigertailz
- Released: 1987
- Studios: Gooseberry Sound Studios, Gerrard Street, London; Loco Studios, near Newport, Wales
- Genre: Glam metal
- Length: 36:41
- Label: Music For Nations
- Producer: Steve James

Tigertailz chronology
Young and Crazy (1987)	Bezerk (1990)

Singles from Young and Crazy
- 1. "Shoot to Kill" Released: 1987; 2. "Livin' Without You" Released: 1988

Young and Crazy is a 1987 album by Tigertailz, with artwork by the band's bassist Pepsi Tate. It has a heavier sound than its successor, with less elements of pop metal. It is the only album to feature the original lead vocalist Steevi Jaimz. The album was released in America on Combat records. The compact disc is now considered a collector's item, and is much sought after by Tigertailz fans. The CD was re-released in the US on May 27, 2008, on independent label Krescendo.

In 2021, Metal Hammer listed Young and Crazy as one of their ten 'obscure but brilliant hair metal albums' in an article.

On 15 October 2022, original vocalist Steevi Jaimz performed a one-off 35th anniversary show at the 229 in London. The album was performed live in full for the first time with a backing band featuring Kai from Esprit D'Air on guitar, previous Tigertailz drummer Robin Guy, and BulletBoys bassist Rob Lane.

== Track listing ==
1. "Star Attraction" - 2:51
2. "Hollywood Killer" - 3:39
3. "Ballerina" (Instrumental) - 0:51
4. "Livin' Without You" - 4:17
5. "Shameless" - 4:20
6. "City Kidz" - 3:56
7. "Shoot to Kill" - 3:20
8. "Turn Me On" - 2:44
9. "She'z Too Hot" - 3:12
10. "Young and Crazy" - 3:03
11. "Fall in Love Again" - 4:44

All songs written by S. Jaimz/J. Pepper, except "She'z Too Hot" written by P. Tate

== Personnel ==
Tigertailz

- Steevi Jaimz - vocals
- Jay Pepper - guitar
- Pepsi Tate - bass guitar, keyboards
- Ace Finchum - drums

with:

- Tim Lewis - keyboards
- Jakki Lynn, Toni - backing vocals
