= Tigertailz =

Welsh glam metal band from Cardiff

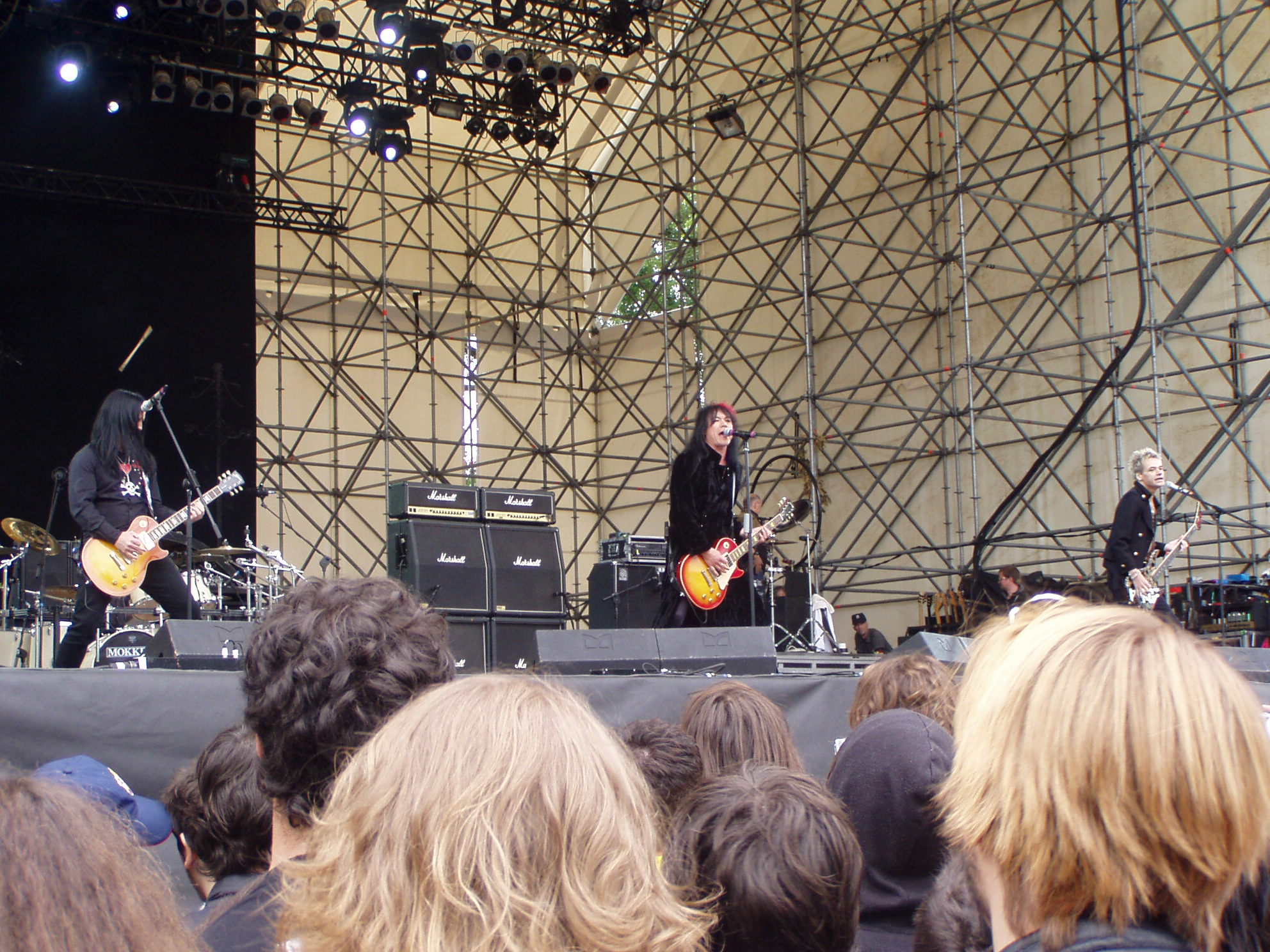
- Tigertailz performing in 2007

Background information
- Origin: Cardiff, Wales
- Genre: Glam metal
- Years active: 1984–1996, 2005–present
- Labels: Music for Nations, Demolition, Sanctuary, Relativity, Combat
- Members: Jay Pepper; Matthew Blakout; Ashley Edison
- Past members: Steevi Jaimz; Pepsi Tate † (Huw Justin Smith); Cy Danahar; Andy Skinner; Glenn "Nailz" Quinn; Robin Guy †; Sarah Firebrand; Kim Hooker; Ace Finchum †; Jason Sims; Jules Millis; Rob Wylde; Berty Burton

Tigertailz are a Welsh glam metal band from Cardiff. Their 1990 album Bezerk made the Top 40 on the UK Albums Chart and contained the hit singles "Love Bomb Baby" and "Heaven". The band reformed in 2005.

== History ==
=== Formation and early years ===
Tigertailz (originally Stagefright) formed in 1984 when guitarist Jay Pepper joined bassist Pepsi Tate and drummer Ian Welch, responding to their advert in Cardiff record store Spillers Records. Adding guitarist Phil Harling and singer Jim Dovey, the band amassed a local following. Former Treason and Crash KO members vocalist Steevi Jaimz (Steve Denham) replaced Dovey, and drummer Ace Finchum (Stephen Wayne Finchum) replaced Welch to complete the line-up for the band's debut album.

=== Commercial success (1987–1995) ===
Part of the nascent glam metal scene in the late 1980s, Tigertailz issued their debut album, Young and Crazy, in 1987 with Jaimz, Pepper, Tate, and Finchum. The album included their first single, "Livin' Without You".

There was conflict among band members as Tigertailz toured, so the band recruited Kim Hooker to replace Jaimz for follow-up album Bezerk, released in 1990 on Music For Nations.

Prior to the release of Bezerk, the band re-recorded "Livin' Without You" with Hooker as vocalist, releasing it as a single. Bezerk saw the band break through as a headline act, and delivered three singles, "Love Bomb Baby", "Noise Level Critical" and "Heaven". The album peaked at number 36 on the UK Albums Chart.

Tigertailz released Banzai!, a collection of B-sides and re-recorded tracks, in 1991 in Japan. They also issued Wazbones in 1995, by which time the line-up had fragmented. Cy Danahar replaced Pepper on lead guitar, and Andy Skinner replaced Finchum on drums. The band toured, but was unable to secure a record label deal to sustain the band.

=== Reunion (2005–2009) ===
In 2005, the band reformed their classic line-up, replacing Andy Skinner with former City Kidds drummer Matt Blakout. The band won a court order for ownership of the Tigertailz name, reclaiming it from a spin-off band fronted by Steevi Jaimz.

They completed a reunion tour of the United Kingdom, then performed in festivals in Sweden and Spain for more than 70,000 people with Whitesnake and Twisted Sister. Kerrang! magazine wrote in praise of the reunion, journalist Steve Beebee describing it as "persistently entertaining, with monstrous melodies that reach delirious peaks".

Bezerk 2.0 was released on Demolition Records in August 2006.

On 18 September 2007, aged 42, Pepsi Tate died after suffering with pancreatic cancer. He died at Holme Towers Cancer Hospice in Penarth only a few weeks after he had married his longtime partner, Welsh opera singer Shân Cothi.

The band signed a new recording contract with Sanctuary Records, and in August 2007 released Thrill Pistol, a double album packaged with the previously unreleased original version of 1992's Wazbones album. Beebee praised the album in Kerrang!, calling on fans to "kindly hail this rejuvenated band for the time-defying devils they are". It was dedicated to Pepsi and his family.

Following Tate's death in September 2007, Tigertailz continued to tour with former City Kidds lead guitarist Glenn "Nailz" Quinn playing bass. They played numerous European festival shows, supported Ace Frehley in the UK, and performed at the UK's Hard Rock Hell festival in 2008 and 2009.

=== Bezerk anniversary (2010) ===
In January 2010, Tigertailz recruited Sarah Firebrand, briefly a member of alternative band We've Got a Fuzzbox and We're Gonna Use It, as their new bass player. They played Bezerk entirely in sequence at some live shows, recording some performances for a future live album. After an April benefit performance at the Fuel Rock Club in Cardiff for the Amser Justin Time charity, set up in Pepsi Tate's memory, the band headlined the Stockholm Rock Out Festival in Sweden in May.

Following further Bezerk Live dates, Tigertailz replaced drummer Matt Blakout with former Rachel Stamp drummer Robin Guy. Tigertailz headlined the first night of 2010's Hard Rock Hell and released Bezerk Live - Burnin' Fuel in December. In June 2011, Ace Finchum rejoined the band.

They were expected to record their next studio album in 2011 but in an interview with the Queens of Steel webzine, Jay Pepper cast doubt on the future of the band, saying, "(It's) facing a crossroads as to its survival. I don't know if we can survive the latest troubles."

The band parted company with Sarah Firebrand in late 2011. Frontman Kim Hooker left in 2012, the remaining members citing "a total breakdown of relationship resulting from the singer's unprofessional conduct".

=== New line-up (2012) ===
On 26 June 2012, Tigertailz announced its new line-up, and a European tour for September and October. Joining original members Jay Pepper and Ace Finchum were Jules Millis (vocals), Rob Wylde (guitar) and Jason Sims (bass). The band re-recorded an old song, "Fall In Love Again", and filmed a video for it - with all proceeds going towards a charity set up in Pepsi Tate's memory.

After a tour and an appearance at the Hard Rock Hell festival, this line-up fragmented in 2013. In a statement, Jay Pepper confirmed that there would be no reunion but that he would continue to perform as Tigertailz, and in June 2013 it was confirmed that drummer Matthew Blakout had re-joined the band, with Wylde switching from guitar to bass, and a new EP 'Knives' being prepared for release.

On 7 October 2013, the Classic Rock Magazine website premiered Tigertailz latest video "The Shoe Collector", ahead of the release of the "Knives" EP on 15 October. The magazine described it as "a major step on Tigertailz’ road back from the brink". On 17 February 2014, Classic Rock premiered the second video release from "Knives" EP "One Life". On 30 June 2014, Classic Rock once again premiered the final video from "Knives" EP "Punched In The Gutz" Filmed in Cardiff's St David's Hall in November 2013.

Tigertailz announced European tour dates for Autumn 2014 and also made their US debut. They supported Kiss and Cheap Trick on the 2014 Kiss Kruise.

A further line up change happened in 2015 when vocalist Jules Millis was replaced by guitarist turned bassist now turned vocalist Rob Wylde, with the bass position being filled by Berty Burton.

In 2016, this line up released the song "Pipped It, Popped It" which they - unsuccessfully - submitted for consideration as a UK Eurovision Song Contest entry. The song was included on the largely ignored 2016 Blast album released on the band's own TT Records.

In 2019, the band were forced to cancel an appearance at Hard Rock Hell due to guitarist Jay Pepper's worsening hearing loss.

Tigertailz made a headline appearance at the 2021 Hard Rock Hell event in Sheffield 1 August 2021 to a sold out crowd and followed up with a performance at another Hard Rock Hell festival in Great Yarmouth 6 November, with Jay Pepper having overcome his hearing difficulties.

Jay Pepper confirmed Tigertailz would continue to perform and record into 2022.

On 20 May 2022, the Tigertailz FaceBook page announced that Rob Wylde was no longer a member of the band. On 17 December 2022 the band announced that Dendera and Power Quest frontman Ashley Edison would be joining the band as the new vocalist.

Former drummer Ace Finchum died in October 2025, at the age of 62.

=== Bare Knuckle Messiahs ===
A second Tigertailz reunion (of sorts) took place in 2019 when departed vocalist Kim Hooker announced his new band Bare Knuckle Messiahs which features Hooker on vocals and guitar, joined by two former "Wazbones" era Tigertailz members, guitarist Cy Danaher and drummer Andy Skinner, with the line up being rounded out with the addition of bassist JJ. Hooker's new band released their debut album That Which Preys On The Dead through the DIAFOL label in October 2019.

== Band members ==
Current members

- Jay Pepper – lead guitar, backing vocals (1984–1994, 2005–present)
- Matthew Blakout – drums, percussion (2005–2010, 2013–present)
- Ashley Edison - lead vocals (2022–present)

Past members

- Steevi Jaimz - lead vocals (1984–1988)
- Kim Hooker – lead vocals, occasional rhythm guitar (1988–1996, 2005–2012)
- Jules Millis – lead vocals (2012–2015)
- Rob Wylde - lead vocals (2015–2022), rhythm guitar (2012–2013), bass (2013–2015)
- Berty Burton - bass (2015–2024)
- Cy Danahar - lead guitar (1994–1996)
- Pepsi Tate - bass (1984–1996, 2005–2007; died 2007)
- Glenn Quinn - bass (2007–2009)
- Sarah Firebrand - bass (2010–2012)
- Andy Skinner - drums (1991–1996)
- Jason Sims – bass, backing vocals (2012–2013)
- Ace Finchum – drums, percussion, backing vocals (1984–1991, 2011–2013; died 2025)
- Robin Guy – drums (2010–2011; died 2024)

== Discography ==
=== Studio albums ===
- Young and Crazy (1987)
- Bezerk (1990) UK No. 36
- Banzai! (1991)
- Wazbones! (1995)
- Original Sin (2003)
- Bezerk 2.0 (2006)
- Thrill Pistol (2007)
- Lost Reelz (2015)
- Blast (2016)

=== Live albums ===
- You Lookin' at Me? (1996) (live)
- Bezerk Live-Burnin' Fuel (2010)

=== EPs ===
- Knives (2013)
- Shoot To Kill (2016)
