= Shizuku (song) =

Single by Esprit D'Air
- Released: June 29, 2012 (single version); February 10, 2023 (re-recorded version feat. Misstiq)
- Recorded: 2012 (2012 version); 2022 (2023 version)
- Genre: Electronicore, alternative metal
- Length: 4:23
- Label: Starstorm Records
- Songwriters: Kai, Yoshisuke Suga
- Producer: Kai

Esprit D'Air singles chronology
"Shizuku" (2012)	"Leviathan" (2020)

"Shizuku" (雫, literally "droplet") is a song by Japanese electronicore band Esprit D'Air, originally released on June 29, 2012, as a single. It was later re-recorded and re-released on February 10, 2023, in collaboration with Australian producer, Misstiq and new vocals from Kai.

Shizuku is one of Esprit D'Air's oldest songs. The song was producer Kai's first song he had ever produced with the original singer Yoshisuke Suga.

== Chart performance ==
The single entered the Official Charts, peaking at #4 in the Physical Singles Chart, #47 in the Single Downloads Chart, and #37 in the Single Sales Chart.

== Use in video games ==
"Shizuku" appears in the Harmonix's Rock Band video game series. It was first available on Rock Band 3 for Xbox 360 as the first playable song in the 'J-Rock' genre tag of the game in 2013. It was later re-released onto Rock Band 4 for both Xbox One and PlayStation 4 in 2023, still as the only song in the 'J-Rock' genre tag.

== Track listing ==
=== Original 2012 version ===
No.	Title	Length
1.	"Shizuku"	4:23

=== Re-recorded 2023 version ===
No.	Title	Length
1.	"雫 ('Shizuku') feat. Misstiq"	4:23

== Charts ==
Chart performance of "Shizuku"
Chart	Peak position
UK Singles Sales Chart	37
UK Singles Downloads Chart	47
Official Physical Singles Chart	4
