= Esprit D'Air =

Japanese rock band

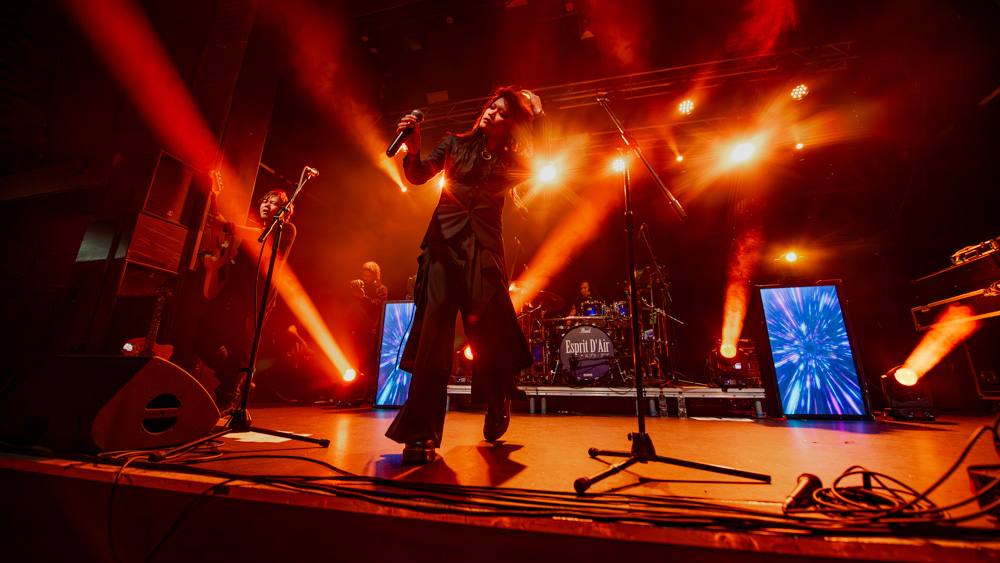
- Esprit D'Air performing at Manchester Academy in 2025

Background information
- Origin: London, England
- Genres: Alternative metal; electronicore; gothic metal; progressive metal
- Years active: 2010–2013 (as a group), 2016–present (as a solo project)
- Label: Starstorm
- Members: Kai; Yusuke Okamoto; Takeshi Tokunaga; Jan-Vincent Velazco
- Past members: Ellis; Yoshisuke Suga; Daishi; Yuki; Coma; Tatsuya Nashimoto (Hakuren)
- Website: www.espritdair.com

Esprit D'Air ("Spirit of Air" in French) is an alternative metal band formed in 2010 with members from Japan who coalesced in London. The band is led and fronted by Kai, current guitarist of the Sisters of Mercy. Their latest album Aeons entered #1 in the Official Rock & Metal Albums Chart.

In 2013, the band increased in popularity as their single "Shizuku" became the first playable song in the J-rock category in the video game Rock Band 3 (and now Rock Band 4 since 2023) but disbanded in the same year as members went back to Japan. Since reforming in 2016, Kai appoints session musicians and support members, which included some of the original line-up to perform with him on tour.

Reformed in 2016 as Kai's solo project, their debut album Constellations was released in 2017, to critical acclaim. The album won "Best Metal Album" at the Independent Music Awards, judged by a panel including Amy Lee of Evanescence, Slayer, and Sepultura and entered the Top 40 Rock & Metal Albums Chart.

In 2022, Esprit D'Air released their second album Oceans, which entered the UK Official Charts peaking at #8 in the Rock & Metal Albums Chart, and #5 in the Independent Albums Breakers Charts. The album later re-entered the charts for several weeks following the success of their UK Oceans tour in summer 2022.

== History ==
=== Formation and Deai (2010–2011) ===
The band met at a concert in London and made their debut in May 2010. At the time, the band had five members – Yosh (lead vocals), Kai (lead guitar and backing vocals), Ellis (bass), Yuki (rhythm guitar) and Daishi (drums). Esprit D'Air first released an EP entitled 'Deai' in October 2010, which loosely translates to 'encounter'. Kai described the name as a 'sort of like the first hello from the band'. They recorded the 3-track EP at Sarm East Studios in Brick Lane, London.

Since forming in 2010, the band performed at numerous shows in the UK and Spain and have been interviewed by Japanese video sharing website, Nico Nico Douga.

In early 2011, rhythm guitarist Yuki left the band for personal reasons, leaving the band as a four-piece, whilst Yosh organised and performed at charity events in aid of Japan's 2011 Tōhoku earthquake and tsunami. The band also announced news about their second release.

=== The Hunter and Shizuku (2012) ===
In February 2012, Esprit D'Air released The Hunter and performed two headline shows at Nambucca (London, UK) and La Farga (Barcelona, Spain) as part of their single launch. Tom Smith, the director of European-based independent record label JPU Records (The Gazette, Polysics, Ling Tosite Sigure), described the single as a release that 'excites them much more than any recent visual kei or J-rock from Japan'.

In June 2012, Esprit D'Air released Shizuku and offered the track free for a limited time.

=== Rock Band 3, hiatus and Yosh's departure (2012–2013) ===
In early 2013, the band rose in popularity as Shizuku became the first playable Japanese-language track on the Xbox 360 video game, Rock Band 3 and the only track to be featured in the J-Rock category.

Due to personal reasons, Yosh was no longer a part of the band in early 2013 and returned to Tokyo six months after the band announced their indefinite hiatus in late 2013.

=== Coma, Hakuren and disbandment (2013) ===
Coma and Hakuren joined as the new lead vocalist and rhythm guitarist respectively, in April 2013 making the band a five-piece once again. However, the band performed their last show with this line-up at Brighton Japan Festival in September 2013. A month later, Coma flew back to Tokyo, Japan without a definite plan to return. With the singer in another country, the band could not see a future together and decided to disband, despite having record label interest for their upcoming album.

It was revealed in an interview with Louder Sound that the disbandment was partially due to primary songwriter and composer Kai's depression and personal struggles, which led him to split up the band.

=== Reunion and comeback single, Rebirth (2016) ===
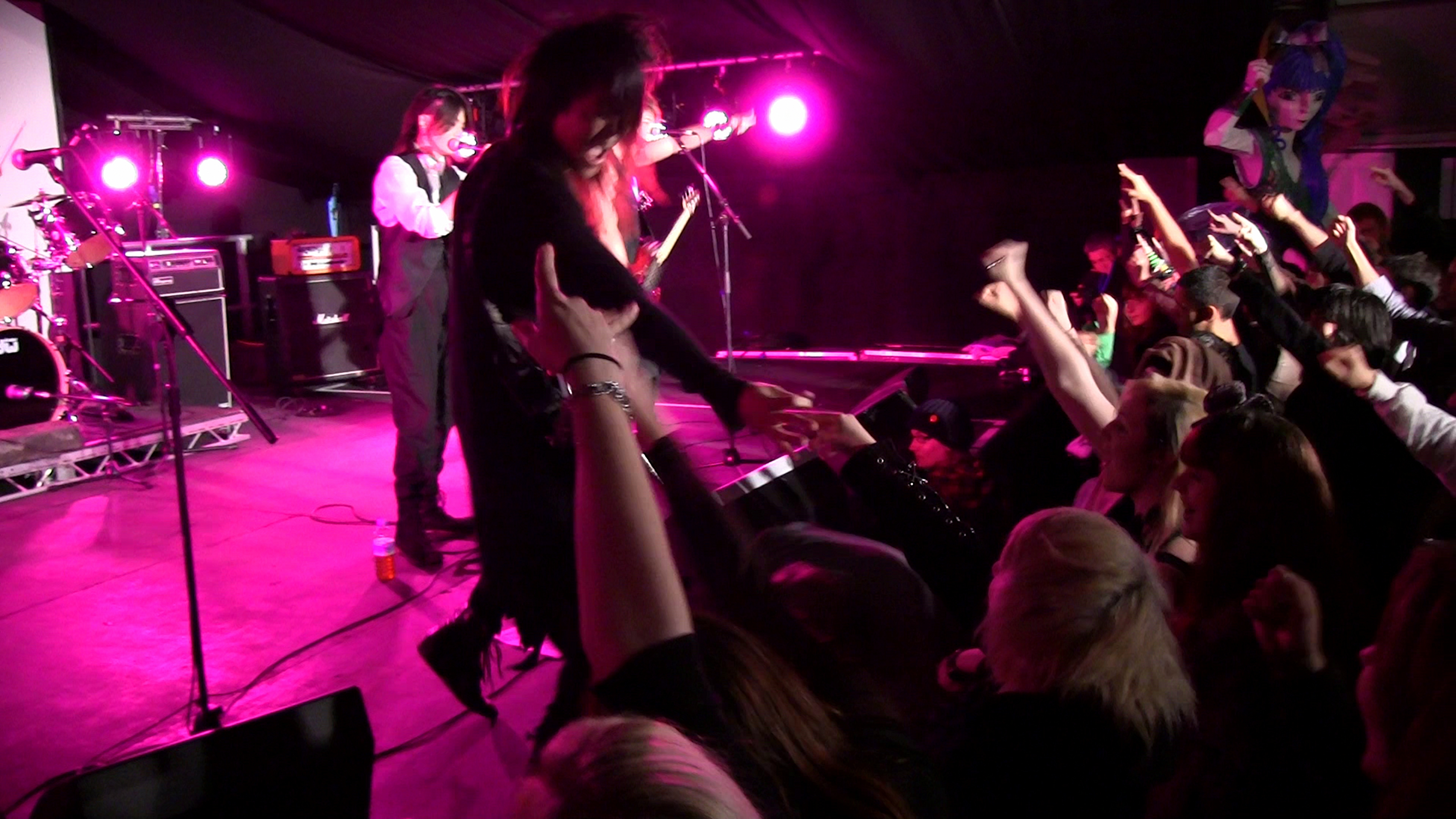
Esprit D'Air in 2013

In March 2016, Esprit D'Air reunited for a one-off show as a three-piece with Kai on vocals to perform at a charity event in London, where all proceeds went to Aoba-gakuen, an orphanage in Fukushima, Japan. Through ticket, merchandise, food sales, and donations, the event raised over £1,100 for the orphanage. At this point, it was uncertain whether Esprit D'Air were going to reform. Subsequently, due to interest and demand by fans, in June 2016, Esprit D'Air officially announced their return with original guitarist Kai taking over the role of lead vocalist, Ellis on bass and Daishi on drums (it is later revealed that Ellis and Daishi were not really in the reformation but as session musicians). The band also announced three shows, including a performance at the main stage of Hyper Japan Festival.

In December 2016, Esprit D'Air released "Rebirth", their first single in four years and celebrated the launch of their single at Zigfrid von Underbelly in London and at Le Trianon in Paris. According to Kai, the song tells the story of a man who finds his voice and sings under the stars, this leads to him becoming the savior of his town as his voice inspires and refreshes everyone who hears it. The first and second lines allude to the beautiful view of audiences from the stage ("Aoku yureta hoshi wo matoi" – in blurred lights of the blue stars). The middle bridge implies his bright future, and how he's moving forward towards it.

=== Constellations (2017–2018) ===
In March 2017, Esprit D'Air performed a full capacity headline show at the O2 Academy2 Islington.

In April 2017, the band released their second comeback single, Guiding Light and premiered their music video exclusively with Teamrock.com, and was later listed as their top 50 best rock songs of 2017 so far.

Esprit D'Air released their album Constellations digitally on 30 June, followed by a physical album on 7 July featuring three bonus tracks under Starstorm Records. Kai described the overarching theme of the album as finding hope and positivity in the darkest and most challenging times.

"For example, Rebirth is a story of a man who regained his voice to sing again among the stars. It reflects my personal story of the reformation of Esprit D'Air, and the strong feelings I have of performing music again after many struggles. Guiding Light is about finding optimism and the will of moving forward in the most bleak of times. Starstorm is an abstract story about fulfilling a promise in the doomed future on a dying planet. Reminisce is about the death of someone really important to you, but you move on as you reminisce about the person, with the last line meaning 'my courage has just started to turn into freedom'. Versus is about chasing your dreams – the 'you' in the Japanese lyrics sounds like it is chasing romance, but the 'you' is actually used as a metaphor for your dreams."

Constellations reached number three in the Amazon.com hard rock & metal sales charts and number eight in the rock charts. The album release was shortly followed by a release of another single, Ignition in August, and the single received airplay on Kerrang! Radio.

Esprit D'Air performed at O2 Academy Islington as a support act for The Birthday Massacre on 24 October 2017, as well as a 7-day headline UK tour in London, Cardiff, Birmingham, Manchester, Newcastle, Carlisle and Glasgow in February 2018 to celebrate the release of Constellations.

In January 2018, Esprit D'Air released their single "Starstorm" from their album Constellations. The single version is remastered by Stuart Hawkes, who is known for his works with Miyavi, Sugizo, and Mika Nakashima. It also contains a remix by Shudan and an instrumental version.

In March 2018, Esprit D'Air won the award for "Best Metal or Hardcore Album" at The Independent Music Awards in New York for their album Constellations. The judging panel featured Amy Lee of Evanescence, Slayer and Sepultura. The band shortly announced that they will extend their Constellations Tour to Europe in September 2018.

In May 2018, the band released the single, "Calling You". The track featured on Louder's Tracks Of The Week alongside Nine Inch Nails, Ghost and Bullet for My Valentine, and also received its first airplay on BBC Radio.

In August 2018, Esprit D'Air released a cover of Dead End's "Serafine".

At the end of 2018, Esprit D'Air was nominated for "Best Musical Act" at the Neo Awards, sponsored by Sega. The band finished fourth place among Crossfaith, The GazettE, and Band-Maid.

=== Oceans (2018-present) ===
Esprit D'Air recorded their second album Oceans from 2018 to the end of 2021. It was finally released in February 2022 and reached #8 in the UK Rock & Metal Albums Chart. The recording of the album was halted in mid-2019 when producer Kai's laptop was stolen.

At the start of 2019, Esprit D'Air started a crowdfunding campaign to raise funds to release their new single "Amethyst". The band reached their goal within three days. Midway through the campaign, Ellis left the band for personal reasons, and the single was released in February 2019.

In June 2019, it was announced that the laptop that contained all the contents of their upcoming album was stolen from them, which meant that they would have to start the recording process all over again. It was then that they had also announced that the upcoming album was going to be entitled, Oceans. The release of the new album is now delayed as Esprit D'Air is re-recording it. The stolen work also included backups of their single "Amethyst".

In May 2020, Esprit D'Air announced their 10th anniversary show to take place at The Dome in London on 24 October 2020. However, due to the COVID-19 pandemic, the live show was replaced by a livestream on the same date, and instead took place at KK's Steel Mill in Wolverhampton.

In December 2020, Esprit D'Air released their single, "Leviathan" accompanied by a music video directed by Andy Mihov, which premiered on Loudwire. Kai tells Loudwire:

"We interpreted 'Leviathan' as a huge power or impact beyond human power or knowledge. When we wrote this, we were thinking about how significantly our world has changed with the pandemic and how we can think positively and have hopes in tough times. Through our composition and songwriting, we tried to express lights of despair, human weakness and stupidity, and human wisdom to build a new world."

The release of "Leviathan" garnered some praise from peers with The Sisters of Mercy's Ben Christo stating of the song, "It's a really unique blend of djent, industrial, electro, goth, emo, metal and much more. I love the dramatics and cinematic quality it has, with haunting, melancholy colors swooping betwixt the cruel, relentless jaws of the machine." Michael Falcore of The Birthday Massacre stated that "Leviathan" is a "wonderful song, feels like a modern day opera with heavy guitars set on fire! Melancholic and haunting, the vocals cut deep. A truly inspired song." Accompanied with the release were two remixes, one in the style of drum and bass by Los Angeles-based Heavygrinder, and one in the style of eurobeat by London-based producer Shirobon. Matthew Kiichi Heafy of Trivium also played 'Leviathan' as an opening track on his Chaos Hour show on SiriusXM.

In February 2021, Esprit D'Air released their 10th Anniversary Live album with recordings from their online concert in October 2020. The physical CD version contains the full twelve tracks, whilst the digital version contains ten recordings from the show.

In March 2021, Esprit D'Air released a cover of X Japan's Kurenai, with the guitars, bass, and vocals recorded by Kai, and drums by Jan-Vincent Velazco. Due to the ongoing pandemic, this is the first release by Esprit D'Air without a full performance music video and instead was released with a motion graphics video.

In April 2021, Esprit D'Air released their single, 'Nebulae'. The single is described as a song about moving forward and taking the wheel of your own life. Kai commented, "We can let circumstances rule us, or we can take charge of our destiny. This is our anthem of motivation and inventing our own future.". It was announced that Esprit D'Air will continue to release new music every six weeks via the Patreon platform.

In June 2021, Esprit D'Air released their single, 'Glaciers'. The single went towards having a post-rock ballad direction, which Kai has said was inspired by bands such as Mogwai and Explosions in the Sky.

In July 2021, Esprit D'Air released a re-recorded version of their 2017 single 'Guiding Light' containing a different ending and arrangement.

In September 2021, Esprit D'Air announced their return to performing a concert in London at the O2 Academy Islington in February 2022 and released their single, 'Tsunami', which is performed in a heavier djent and electronicore style. The video features touring members Jan-Vincent, Yusuke, and Takeshi.

In October 2021, Esprit D'Air released the single Souhou Raiā in collaboration with Tokyo-based Vocaloid producer UmiKazeTaiyou.

In November 2021, Esprit D'Air released a new orchestra mix and re-recording of their debut song Deai.

In January 2021, it was announced that the new album Oceans would finally be released on 18 February 2022. The album includes songs ('Dead Zone' and 'The Abyss') that feature The Sisters of Mercy member Ben Christo, and Ryo Kinoshita from Japanese metalcore band Crystal Lake as special guest vocalists, respectively.

In February 2022, the second album Oceans was finally released. The album entered four UK Official Charts positions, including number 13 on the Top 40 Rock and Metal Albums in that week. The album was also listed on Loudwire, Metal Injection, and the Knotfest news website and received favorable reviews by critics. Simultaneously, Esprit D'Air released an enhanced edition of the 'Leviathan' music video called 'Leviathan 2.0', featuring new visual effects created by Andy Mihov and a team across the UK, France, and Taiwan. The music video went on to win a few cinematography and music video awards.

The Oceans album was followed up by a launch party at the O2 Academy Islington on 20 February, and a summer UK tour, which includes a headline festival slot at Amplified Festival.

In March 2022, Esprit D'Air released a video and single for 'Dead Zone' featuring Ben Christo from The Sisters of Mercy.

After their UK summer tour in July and August 2022, the Oceans album re-entered the Official Charts in six categories including #8 in the Top 40 Rock and Metal Albums and #5 in Independent Albums Breakers. The album re-entered a few more times and stayed in the charts for weeks.

Esprit D'Air announced several tour dates across the UK performing in Cardiff, York, Newcastle upon Tyne, Edinburgh, Manchester, Birmingham and London in February 2023, selling out a couple of dates months in advance.

=== Seasons (2023-2024) ===
In January 2023, 'Shizuku' was released on Rock Band 4 for PlayStation 4 and Xbox One, ten years after its release on its predecessor Rock Band 3. The song remains as the only song within the 'J-Rock' genre tag.

It was announced that Esprit D'Air is working on a re-recording and re-release of 'Shizuku' due to be released in February 2023 to commemorate its 10th anniversary.

In collaboration with Australian producer Misstiq, Esprit D'Air released 'Shizuku' on 10 February with an animated music video. The new version contained new synthesizers and keyboard parts provided by Misstiq and guitars, vocals, bass, and drums recorded by Kai.

After selling out their entire UK tour in 2023, they announced new dates in Poland, Hungary and Spain in 2023, and the UK and Ireland in 2024.

On 29 September 2023, Esprit D'Air collaborated with ex-Judas Priest vocalist Tim "Ripper" Owens on an Iron Maiden cover of The Trooper, also featuring Ben Christo from The Sisters of Mercy. The track peaked at #1 in the iTunes UK Metal Charts.

In June 2024, Esprit D'Air released a remix of 'Shizuku' by Zardonic.

Esprit D'Air released their third studio album, Seasons, and a live album entitled Live in Barcelona in November 2024, and announced their forthcoming album, Aeons, set for release in 2025.

=== Aeons (2025-present) ===
In March and April 2025, Esprit D'Air embarked on a European tour across ten countries, promoting the Seasons album and previewing songs from the upcoming Aeons album.

Esprit D'Air released the single "Lost Horizon" on 28 February 2025, as the first single from their upcoming album Aeons. Metal Hammer included it in their Tracks of the Week feature and described it as "sci-fi noir".

The second single "Shadow of Time" was released two weeks after on 14 March 2025.

Two weeks later, the third single "Zetsubou no Hikari" was released on 28 March 2025, showcasing a nu metal approach.

In July 2025, a tour announcement of the UK and Ireland was made. Fourth single "Silver Leaf" was released on 18 July and was voted as the best metal song of the week on Metal Hammer.

In September 2025, the fifth single "Chronos" was released and was also voted as the best metal song of the week on Metal Hammer, and was played on Ireland's RTÉ radio station.

== Musical style and influences ==
Like many Japanese rock bands, Esprit D'Air has been categorized in many genres, but they are mainly known as an electronic metal band. In various interviews, Kai has said his favorite bands are Iron Maiden, Judas Priest, Megadeth, X Japan, Mötley Crüe, W.A.S.P., and Anthrax, although the music of Esprit D'Air does not reflect this. Kai says:

"How I approach music is to try and evolve from what is already done in rock and metal music. I do not find it inspiring to copy music that is already done, but at the same time, I also do not want to follow a current trend."

In an article about Japanese rock and metal bands on Loudwire, Kai cites X Japan, Dead End, and L'Arc-en-Ciel (particularly Hyde) to be some of his main influences.

== Personnel ==
During their brief 2010–2013 line-up, Esprit D'Air was a group where all members contributed to the songwriting and production. Since their reformation in 2016, Esprit D'Air is now considered to be a one-man band, with Kai being the sole official member, playing and recording all instruments on the releases, and having complete creative control. In a recent interview with Heavy Magazine, it is confirmed that Esprit D'Air is Kai's solo project since 2016.

In a live setting, Kai appoints a backing group of musicians to perform the songs, including long-time previous official members Ellis on bass (until 2019) and Daishi on drums (until 2018), as well as Pendragon's Jan-Vincent Velazco on drums. Kai also books and promotes tours for Esprit D'Air without a booking agent or promoter. Esprit D'Air takes a DIY approach by purposely not seeking a label, management, or booking agent, but instead manage everything themselves to be as self-sufficient as possible.

== Band members ==
=== Current members ===
Official members

- Kai – guitar (2010–2013, 2016–present), lead vocals, bass guitar, drums, composer (2016–present)

Session/touring members

- Jan-Vincent Velazco – drums, percussion (2016–present)
- Yusuke Okamoto – guitar (2019–present)
- Takeshi Tokunaga – bass (2019–present)

=== Past members ===
Official members

- Yuki – guitar (2010–2011)
- Tatsuya "Hakuren" Nashimoto – guitar (2013)
- Ellis – bass (2010–2013, 2016–2018 live only)
- Daishi – drums, percussion (2010–2013, 2016–2017 live only)
- Yoshisuke "Yosh" Suga – lead vocals (2010–2013)
- Coma – lead vocals (2013)

Session/touring members

- Jimmy Pallagrosi – percussion, drums (2016)
- Chris Allan-Whyte – percussion, drums (2016–2017)
- Ryoma "Ryo" Takahashi – guitar (2016–present)
- Juri Uchishiba – violin (2016–2017), acoustic sessions
- Yutaka Kaneko – percussion (2016–2017), acoustic sessions
- Taku Miyamoto – percussion, drums (2018–2019)
- Yuri Shibuichi – bass (2019)
- Andre Joyzi – percussion, drums (2020)
- Kazuki Nishigaki – bass (2020)

=== Line-ups ===
2010–2011	2011–2013	2013
Yoshisuke "Yosh" Suga – lead vocals; Kai – lead guitar, backing vocals; Ellis – bass, backing vocals; Yuki – rhythm guitar; Daishi – drums	Yoshisuke "Yosh" Suga – lead vocals; Kai – lead guitar, backing vocals; Ellis – bass, backing vocals; Daishi – drums	Coma – lead vocals; Kai – lead guitar, backing vocals; Ellis – bass, backing vocals; Tasuya "Hakuren" Nashimoto – rhythm guitar; Daishi – drums
2013–2016	2016–present
Disbanded	Kai – lead vocals, guitars and various instrumentation

== Discography ==
=== Albums ===
List of albums, with selected chart positions
Title	Album details	Peak chart positions						
Title	Album details	UK Albums Sales	UK Album Downloads	UK Rock & Metal Albums	UK Independent Albums Breakers	UK Independent Albums	UK Physical Albums	Scottish Albums
Constellations	Released: 7 July 2017; Label: Starstorm	—	45	33	16	48	—	81
Oceans	Released: 18 February 2022; Label: Starstorm	25	5	8	5	12	80	19
Seasons	Released: 8 November 2024; Label: Starstorm	—	13	20	5	45	—	—
Aeons	Released: 7 November 2025; Label: Starstorm	29	6	1	3	12	51	—

=== Live albums ===
List of live albums, with selected chart positions
Title	Album details	Peak chart positions	
Title	Album details	UK Album Downloads	UK Independent Albums Breakers
10th Anniversary Live	Released: 5 February 2021; Label: Starstorm	—	—
Live in Barcelona	Released: 8 November 2024; Label: Starstorm	39	20

=== Singles ===
List of singles, with selected chart positions
Title	Year	Single details	Peak chart positions			
Title	Year	Single details	UK Singles Sales	UK Single Downloads	UK Physical	UK Vinyl
Shizuku (雫; Teardrop)	2012	Released: 29 June 2012; Label: Independent	37	47	4	—
Rebirth	2016	Released: 14 December 2016; Label: Starstorm Records	—	—	—	—
Guiding Light	2017	Released: 14 April 2017; Label: Starstorm Records	—	—	—	—
Ignition	2017	Released: 18 August 2017; Label: Starstorm Records	—	—	—	—
Starstorm	2018	Released: 26 January 2018; Label: Starstorm Records	—	—	—	—
Calling You	2018	Released: 11 May 2018; Label: Starstorm Records	—	—	—	—
Serafine	2018	Released: 31 August 2018; Label: Starstorm Records	—	—	—	—
Amethyst	2019	Released: 22 February 2019; Label: Starstorm Records	—	—	—	—
Leviathan	2020	Released: 4 December 2020; Label: Starstorm Records	9	10	4	10
Kurenai (紅; Crimson)	2021	Released: 19 March 2021; Label: Starstorm Records	—	—	—	—
Nebulae	2021	Released: 30 April 2021; Label: Starstorm Records	—	—	—	—
Glaciers	2021	Released: 11 June 2021; Label: Starstorm Records	—	—	—	—
Guiding Light (Reimagined)	2021	Released: 23 July 2021; Label: Starstorm Records	—	—	—	—
Tsunami (津波)	2021	Released: 3 September 2021; Label: Starstorm Records	—	—	—	—
Souhou Raiā (双方ライアー) (feat. UmiKazeTaiyou)	2021	Released: 15 October 2021; Label: Starstorm Records	—	—	—	—
Deai - Orchestra Mix (出逢い - オーケストラ・ミックス)	2021	Released: 26 November 2021; Label: Starstorm Records	—	—	—	—
The Abyss (feat. Ryo Kinoshita)	2022	Released: 11 February 2022; Label: Starstorm Records	—	—	—	—
Dead Zone (feat. Ben Christo)	2022	Released: 11 March 2022; Label: Starstorm Records	—	—	—	—
Shizuku (雫; Teardrop) (feat. Misstiq)	2023	Released: 10 February 2023; Label: Starstorm Records	—	—	—	—
Guiding Light (SlYder Remix)	2023	Released: 1 September 2023; Label: Starstorm Records	—	—	—	—
The Trooper (feat. Tim "Ripper" Owens & Ben Christo)	2023	Released: 29 September 2023; Label: Starstorm Records	—	—	—	—
Grudge	2023	Released: 27 October 2023; Label: Starstorm Records	—	—	—	—
Shizuku (Zardonic Remix)	2024	Released: 14 June 2024; Label: Starstorm Records	—	—	—	—
Glaciers (Orchestral Version)	2024	Released: 12 July 2024; Label: Starstorm Records	—	—	—	—
Aire (アイレ; Air)	2024	Released: 30 August 2024; Label: Starstorm Records	—	—	—	—
Lost Horizon	2025	Released: 28 February 2025; Label: Starstorm Records	—	—	—	—
Shadow of Time	2025	Released: 14 March 2025; Label: Starstorm Records	—	—	—	—
Zetsubou no Hikari (絶望の光; Light of Despair)	2025	Released: 28 March 2025; Label: Starstorm Records	—	—	—	—
Silver Leaf	2025	Released: 18 July 2025; Label: Starstorm Records	—	—	—	—
Chronos	2025	Released: 19 September 2025; Label: Starstorm Records	—	—	—	—

=== Extended plays ===
Year	Album details
2010	Deai (出逢い; Encounter): Released: 29 October 2010; Label: Independent
2012	The Hunter: Released: 29 February 2012; Label: Independent
2020	Amethyst: Released: 5 June 2020; Label: Starstorm Records
2020	Leviathan: Released: 4 December 2020; Label: Starstorm Records

=== Other appearances ===
- Various artists – Now Hear This! The Winners of The 16th Independent Music Awards (2018)

=== Music videos ===
- The Hunter (2012)
- 雫 ('Shizuku') (2012)
- Rebirth (2016)
- Guiding Light (2017)
- Ignition (2017)
- Starstorm (2018)
- Calling You (2018)
- Serafine (2018)
- Amethyst (2019)
- Leviathan (2020)
- Kurenai (2021)
- Nebulae (2021)
- Glaciers (2021)
- Guiding Light (Reimagined) (2021)
- 津波 ('Tsunami') (2021)
- 双方ライアー ('Souhou Raiā') (2021)
- 出逢い ('Deai') (2021)
- Leviathan 2.0 (Enhanced Edition) (2022)
- The Abyss (2022)
- Dead Zone (2022)
- 雫 ('Shizuku') (2023)
- Glaciers (2024)
- アイレ ('Aire') (2024)
- Lost Horizon (2025)
- Shadow of Time (2025)
- 絶望の光 ('Zetsubou no Hikari') (2025)
- Silver Leaf (2025)

== Awards and nominations ==
=== Boden International Film Festival ===
The Boden International Film Festival showcases documentaries and shorts from around the world.

Year	Nominee / work	Award	Result	Ref.
2022	Leviathan 2.0	Best Music Video	Won	

=== Experimental Film and Music Video Festival ===
The Experimental Film and Music Video Festival runs every three months at the Carlton Cinemas in downtown Toronto, Canada.

Year	Nominee / work	Award	Result	Ref.
2022	Leviathan 2.0	Best Cinematography	Won	

=== JpopAsia Music Awards ===
JpopAsia Music Awards is the largest online Asian music awards with its nominees picked by an online community.

Year	Nominee / work	Award	Result	Ref.
2012	Shizuku	Best J-Rock Single	Nominated	

=== Music Video Awards ===
A competition festival exclusively focused on music videos, music, dance films, and animated music videos.

Year	Nominee / work	Award	Result	Ref.
2022	Leviathan 2.0 (Enhanced Edition)	Best Low Budget	Nominated	

=== Music Video Underground ===
A competition festival exclusively focused on music videos, music, dance films, and animated music videos.

Year	Nominee / work	Award	Result	Ref.
2022	Leviathan 2.0	Best Music Video	Nominated	

=== NEO Awards ===
NEO has run an annual UK-based industry awards since 2005. Readers are encouraged to vote for the best in Asian pop culture, from anime, manga, film and music. Eligible titles must have been released in the UK in the past 12 months, and the winners are announced at MCM London Comic Con.

Year	Nominee / work	Award	Result	Ref.
2017	Esprit D'Air	Best Musical Act (Sponsored by MVM Entertainment)	Nominated	
2019	Esprit D'Air	Best Musical Act (Sponsored by SEGA)	Nominated	

=== Paris Film Awards ===
IMDb qualifier's Paris Film Awards is a monthly international film festival. A selection of short films are screened every month in Paris.

Year	Nominee / work	Award	Result	Ref.
2022	Leviathan 2.0 (Enhanced Edition)	Best Music Video	Won	
2022	Leviathan 2.0 (Enhanced Edition)	Best Director	Won	

=== The Independent Music Awards (IMAs) ===
The Independent Music Awards (IMAs) is an international awards program created by Music Resource Group (MRG) in 2000 to recognize self-distributed recordings and releases from independent record labels.

Year	Nominee / work	Award	Result	Ref.
2018	Constellations	Best Metal/Hardcore Album	Won	

== See also ==
- List of Rock Band Network songs
- Sarm East Studios
