= Ben Christo =

British rock musician

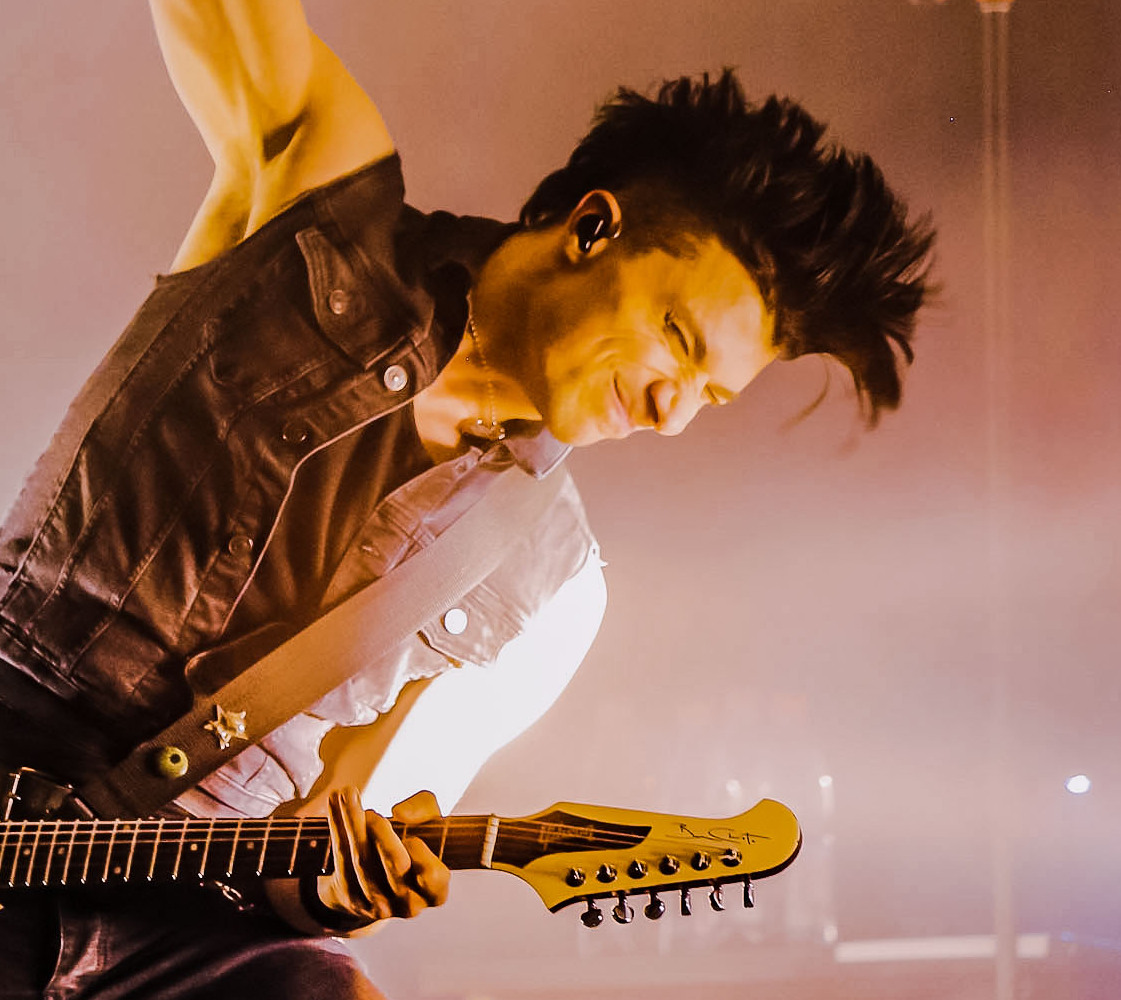
- Christo during a Sisters of Mercy concert in 2024

Background information
- Born: 22 March 1980 (age 46); Bristol, England
- Genres: Industrial rock, alternative rock, alternative metal, gothic rock
- Occupations: Musician, songwriter
- Instruments: Guitar, vocals

Benjamin David Christodoulou (born 22 March 1980) is an English rock musician, guitarist, songwriter, vocalist, lyricist and session musician, he is best known for his tenures with The Sisters of Mercy, Night By Night and Diamond Black.

== Early life ==
Christo was born in Bristol, England and began playing music at seven years old. During a 2023 interview he said: "At a very young age, I gravitated toward any pop music that featured rock guitar. Michael Jackson, Tina Turner, Michael Bolton, even stuff like Belinda Carlisle! If there was a guitar solo or heavy guitar, I would be drawn in". He continued performing in a number of rock, metal and punk bands in his early to mid-teens. At 15, his school group, Balanced State, won the South West of England's regional battle of the bands, leading to his first TV appearance.

== AKO ==
He first saw national success in the hardcore punk/metal/rock band AKO, which he co-founded in 1998, whose debut album received favourable reviews in Kerrang!, Metal Hammer and Total Guitar. The band's unique combination of punk, hardcore, nu-metal and melodic rock caught the attention of Tony Iommi’s management, who gave Christo one of Iommi's old Laney amplifiers and arranged for the band to meet with producer Bob Marlette (Alice Cooper, Shinedown, Rob Zombie), to discuss collaboration on their second album. However, 9/11 severed trans-Atlantic links to such an extent that the plans were shelved indefinitely.

AKO released two more EPs and toured in support of Alkaline Trio, AFI, Stiff Little Fingers, Avenged Sevenfold and Stonesour, amongst others, and were featured on Mike Davies’ BBC Radio 1 show The Lock Up at Maida Vale Studios. The AKO song, "Tread Easy" was used on BBC 2’s "Football Diaries".

The band's final show was at the 2005 South By South West Festival in Austin, Texas. AKO decided to call it a day shortly thereafter and Christo moved to London.

In October 2020, Cherry Red Records began re-releasing the back catalogue on worldwide digital platforms, including previously unreleased single "The Death of Us", which includes never-before-heard B-sides from the "Tomorrow Night's Regret" sessions.

== The Sisters of Mercy ==
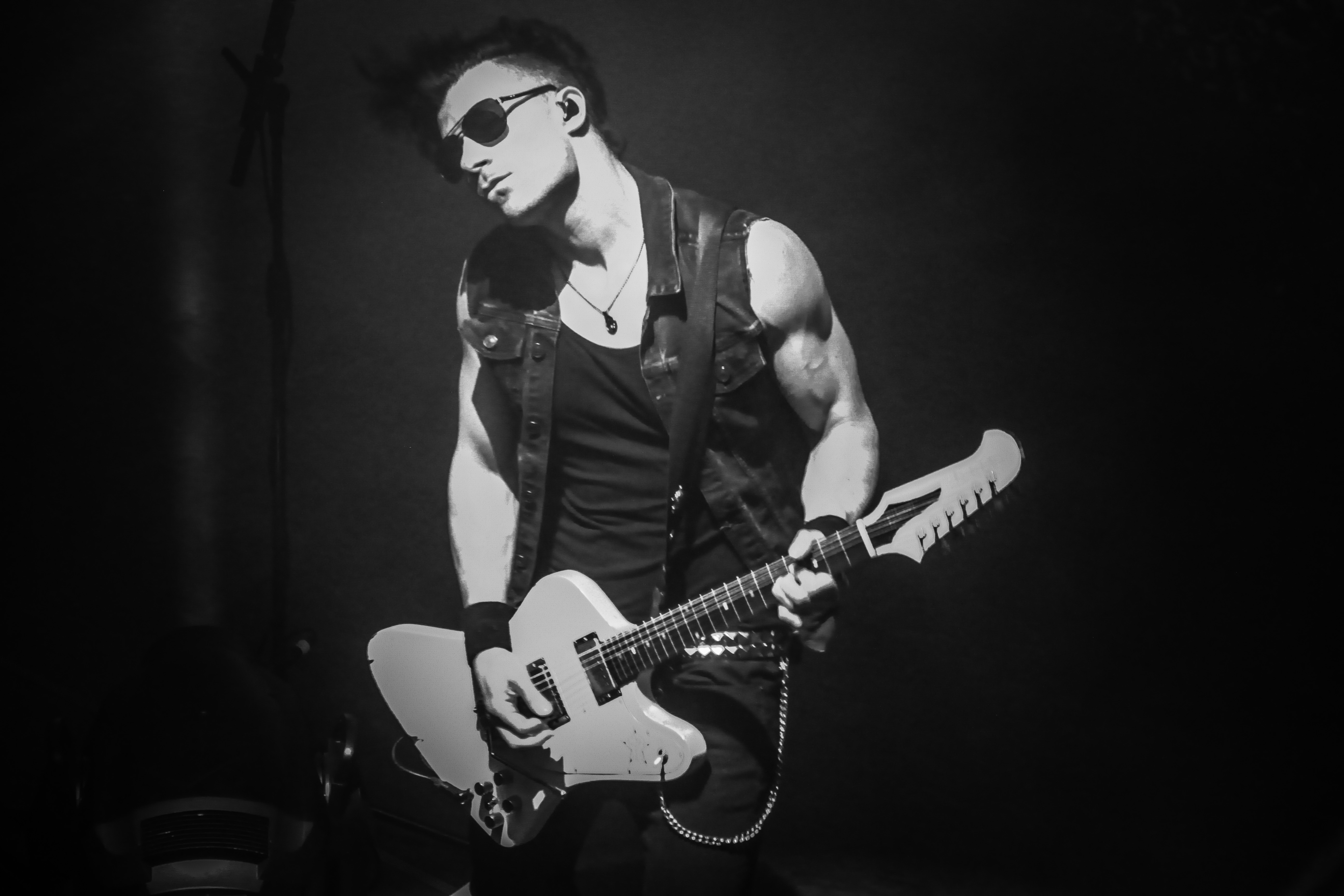
Ben Christo

In 2006, Christo joined The Sisters of Mercy, as lead guitarist and backing vocalist. He was first invited to the band via phone in December 2005. Said Christo, "I got a call one afternoon, from an unknown number. With very little preamble, the caller, without introducing himself, stated, ‘We might want you to be in our band'." He has toured extensively with the band, headlining festivals worldwide such as Sonsiphere, Fuji Rock, Nova Rock, Tuska OpenAir Metal Festival, M’era Luna, Greenfield Festival, Spirit of Burgas, Amphi and Soundwave Australia. The 2019 – 2020 world tour showcased a number of new songs that Christo had co-written with Andrew Eldritch and new guitarist Dylan Smith, with additional new works being premiered during the 2022 tour dates.

2023 saw the band return to the US for the first time in 14 years, commencing at Sick New World Festival, which led to features in LA Weekly and Spin.com. During the Los Angeles date, at the Hollywood Palladium, the band were joined onstage by Berlin vocalist Terri Nunn for a performance of Temple of Love. During the tour, Christo was professionally photographed by and with Lamb of God frontman Randy Blythe. The tour extended in Europe and the UK, with the latter leg seeing a live cameo from Psychedelic Furs' Duncan Kilburn.

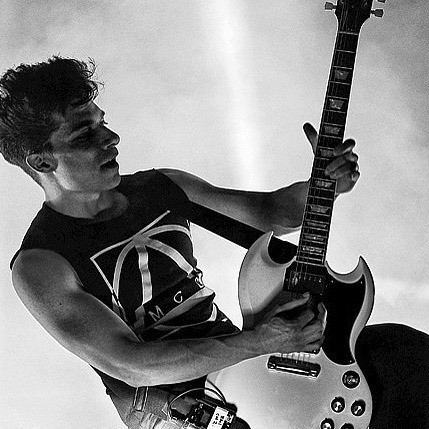
Ben Christo playing with The Sisters of Mercy in Berlin, Germany

In 2024 TSOM returned to the US for an extensive fall tour, supported by Blaqk Audio, featuring Davey Havok and Jade Puget of AFI. The 26-date tour went coast to coast and included Canadian shows in Vancouver and Toronto.

== Night by Night ==
In 2008, Christo founded Night By Night, where he was lead singer, guitarist, primary songwriter and key lyricist for the band. Their first EP, "Just Tonight", was produced by Paul Tipler (Idlewild) and released in 2009. Later recruiting an additional lead singer and expanding to a 5-piece, Night by Night's debut album, "NxN", was released to critical acclaim in 2014.

Produced and mixed by Romesh Dodangoda (Motorhead, Funeral for a Friend) and John Mitchell and released on Sun Hill Production/Cargo Records the album was publicly applauded by several musicians including those from Def Leppard, Kane Roberts, Harem Scarem and Firehouse, claiming 6th place in Fireworks Magazine’s Top 10 Albums of 2014, alongside Mr. Big and Night Ranger. In his review, Classic Rock Magazine’s Geoff Barton scored the album 8/10 and made a point of commending both Christo's lead playing (comparing him to Neal Schon) and lyrics.

In addition to substantial touring across the UK, Sweden, Norway, Finland, Poland, Germany and Switzerland (including shows supporting Alannah Miles, The Quireboys, Lord of the Lost and Jettblack), Night by Night was selected as sole tour supports to both Europe and Y&T, and also appeared at Download (2013) and Hard Rock Hell (2012 and 2015) festivals. In June 2015, the band announced that they would be on hiatus until further notice.

== Diamond Black ==
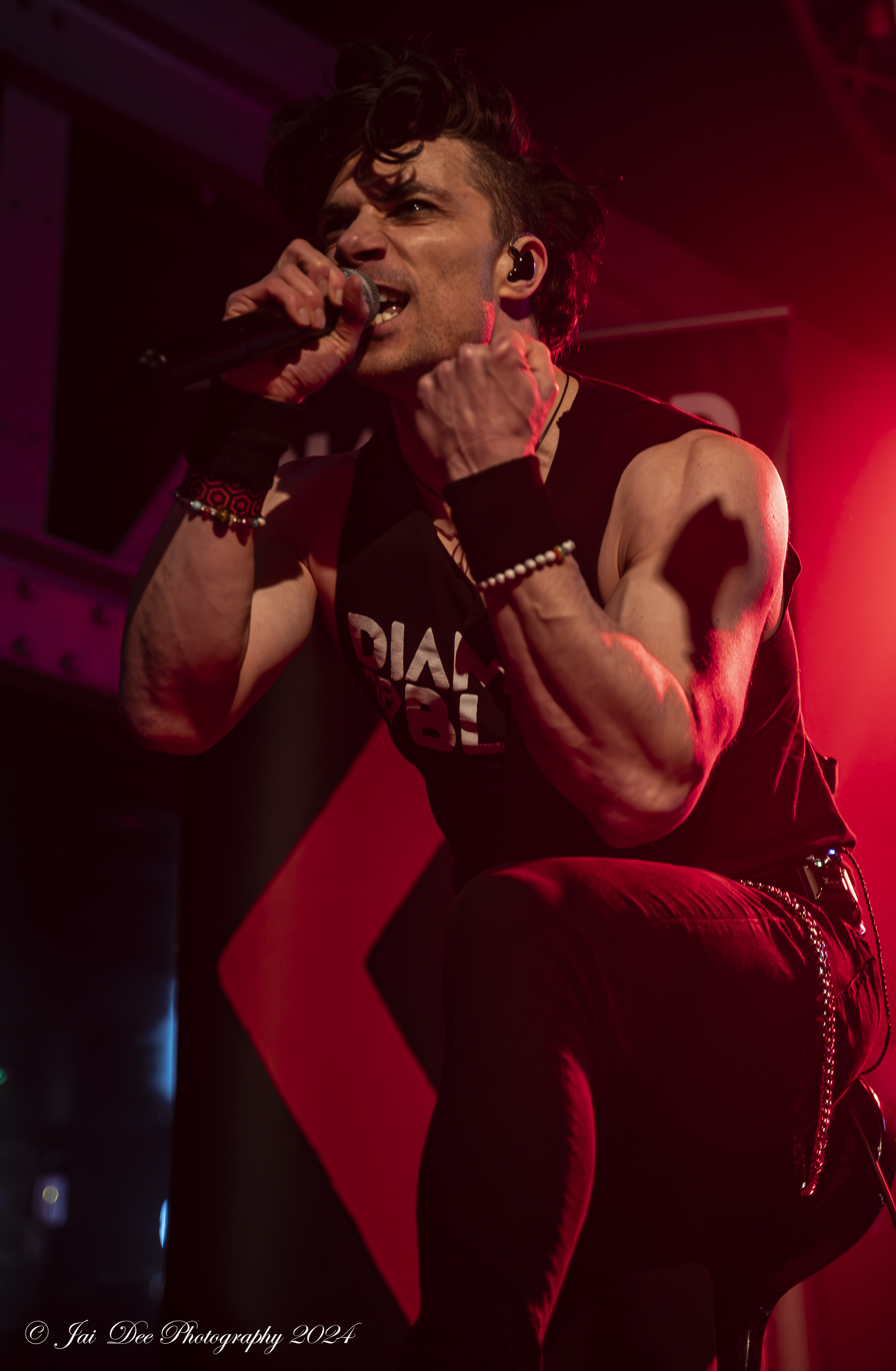
Ben on vocals during a Diamond Black show

In 2016, Christo established dark-rock quartet, Diamond Black, with Finnish singer J.I. Turunen and Finnish producer Jaani Peuhu (Swallow the Sun, Lord of the Lost), with artist & bassist Adam Lightspeed joining shortly after to help create the band's identity. Drummer Jan-Vincent Velazco (Pendragon) was recruited soon after, completing the group. The debut single was released on 20 October 2017 and received public praise from Metal Hammer, W.A.S.P. and Deathstars, with Piggy D of Rob Zombie and Mark Thwaite of The Mission sharing the video on their social media. Sony Pictures Television channel Scuzz set the track on rotation and Bass Guitar Magazine ran a feature on the band. On 12 December, a limited-edition physical copy of the single was released from the band's website, selling out in 2 hours, which included Christo's hand-written lyrics as part of the CD package. In March 2018, Diamond Black toured the UK as sole support to Cellar Darling, to positive feedback from public and press. Soon after, the sophomore single, Ghost in the Glass was released, gaining public acclaim from Therapy?'s Michael McKeegan and scoring the band rotation on one of Spotify's new music playlists, seeing the band's Spotify plays shoot to 70K+ in a number of days. In June 2019, the band signed to Cargo Records, and with first release with the label, The Scarlet, publicly hailed by Michael Rainbow of The Birthday massacre and with the promotional video clip winning first place in both the New York Cinematography Awards and Paris International Music Awards. This activity caught the attention of live booker, United Talent Agency, who signed the band, leading to a support slot to Finnish rockers The 69 Eyes. In June 2020, during worldwide lockdown, the band released single If You Kill My Demons. In August 2022, it was announced that the band would move forward as a three-piece, with Christo adopting lead vocal duties, with a UK tour supporting Esprit D'Air scheduled for February 2023.

The band released single Though the Misery on Cargo, which Jyrki 69 lauded as "Goth AOR... DB are creating a new scene!" and was featured in Sonic Seducer. Summer 2023 UK dates followed with Lord of the Lost and in spring 2024, Diamond Black embarked on another tour with Esprit D'Air, this time expanding into mainland Europe.

June 30th saw the band perform at Hellfest, with dates either side in France and Belgium. The set featured a cameo by Neonfly guitarist Freddy Thunder.

Further singles followed in late 2024 and early 2025: In Venom, featuring Lord of the Lost's Chris Harms and Dark Anthems, with the latter receiving public acclaim from members of Jesus Jones, Boysetsfire, Strung Out and The Wildhearts. Dark Anthems reached number 4 in the German Alternative Singles Charts.

== Session and other work ==
As a studio session guitarist and vocalist, he has recorded with Greg Haver (Manic Street Preachers), Tom Dalgety (Royal Blood, Pixies, Ghost), Raymond Watts (KMFDM, PIG), Steve Lima (Corrine Bailey-Rae) and Bob White of NFD. He has also composed music and lyrics for various international artists, including the no. 2 chart position album Judas by Lord of the Lost.

As a live musician, Christo has also headlined or played shows and festivals alongside Depeche Mode, Metallica, Placebo, Editors, Strung Out, Serj Tankian, The Cult, Faith No More, Marilyn Manson, Tricky, OMD, Machine Head (band), Linkin Park, Rob Zombie, Iron Maiden, Skunk Anansie, Manic Street Preachers, Prophets of Rage and Limp Bizkit and headlined Bloodstock and Grona lund.

In 2002, Christo was selected as one of eight songwriters, alongside Jonny Kalsi, chosen from thousands of members of PRS for Music for their The Song's The Thing workshop, led by Boo Hewerdine. Around the same time, he appeared in a promo feature for Roadrunner Records.

In 2004, Ben co-wrote and directed a comedy short, "Sold Out", with fellow University of Bristol graduate David R. Watson, featuring Ninian Doff (Kasabian, Royal Blood, Miike Snow, Chemical Brothers, Get Duked!) as the D.O.P, Nick Gadd (Sherlock, TV Series) as starring role and John Heffernan in a cameo. The short won a Dazed national film award, selected by Rhys Ifans.

From 2008 to 2016, Christo has featured as a live guitarist and backing vocalist with Richie Faulkner, Therapy?, Mike Tramp, Chris Dale, Doogie White, Stephen Gilchrist, Chris Catalyst, Jon Poole, Boysetsfire, Claytown Troupe and members of Uriah Heep, Breed 77, Rachel Stamp, Ben and Jason, DragonForce, Cradle of Filth and Sikth.

In 2011, Christo wrote and performed live for Lauren Harris’s band, Six Hour Sundown, when previous guitarist Richie Faulkner, who left to join Judas Priest, personally asked Ben to take his place.

In 2014, Christo composed and played guitar parts for Anzi Destruction’s "Black Dog Bias".

From 2016 - 2020, Ben was performer and promoter at Shot Through the Heart, an eighties cover act and monthly rock club night in at The Lounge in London, with whom he performed at Stone Free Festival alongside Scorpions and Megadeth.

In June 2018, Pig released full-length album "Risen", on which Christo co-wrote and performed. The album also features En Esch, Tim Skold, Marc Heal and Mark Thwaite. The album release promoted by a US tour, including a 3-week support slot for Killing Joke on the U.S.A. leg of their fortieth anniversary world tour. In May 2019, The Revelation, a song Ben co-wrote and performed with Raymond Watts was featured in DC Comics' Legends of Tomorrow, as John Constantine prepares to battle demons in the night club ‘Hell’.

April 2019 saw Christo invited by Chris Dale to perform a special show in Sarajevo, Bosnia, commemorating 25 years since Bruce Dickinson’s band, Skunkworks (featuring Dale on bass), had played there during the war (as documented in the award-winning movie "Scream for me Sarajevo"). The show was a sell-out success, filmed for national television and with Dickinson himself in attendance.

In May and August 2018, Christo accompanied Nathan Gray (Boysetsfire) on his solo tour of Germany as guitarist, backing vocalist and keyboard player, the recordings of which were released in February 2019 as a live album and DVD. The physical copies of the album sold out in just 4 days. A European tour followed in March, with many shows being sold out. Ben then co-wrote and performed guitars and backing vocals on a number of Nathan's new recordings, featured on the 2019 EP Split (with Jesse Barnett of Stick to Your Guns ) and the 2020 album Working Title, both produced by Pete Steinkopf of the Bouncing Souls, the new songs from which were debuted on a February 2020 European tour. In August 2022, he rejoined the band for three European festivals.

During lockdown 2020/21, Ben composed and performed parts for Lev Kerzhner and Noa Gruman's Together On Our Own, a remotely-recorded collaboration featuring members of Kamelot and Subway to Sally. He also appeared on Rob Lane's Straight to Video podcast, joining a roster of guests that includes members of Steel Panther, Slash and the Conspirators and The Alice Cooper Band.

Spring 2021 saw Ben remix 'Tribe' for an EP by Caroline of Sunshine Blind, with Christo's version appearing alongside remixes by Mark Thwaite and Andee Blacksugar of KMFDM.

In July 2021, Lord of the Lost's Judas was released, on which Ben contributed music, lyrics, guitars and vocals (Argent - composed lyrics and co-wrote music with Chris Harms and Jaani Peuhu) and Still Life to Die For (composed lyrics, vocal melody, sang all vocals and played lead guitar). The album reached no. 2 in the German mainstream chart.

On January 18, 2022, it was announced that Ben would join Ricky Warwick (The Almighty, Black Star Riders, Thin Lizzy) on his upcoming solo tour of the UK and Ireland, as lead guitarist and backing vocalist, alongside Jack Taylor (Tax the Heat) and Richard Vernon (The Mission).

In summer that year, IANAI's Sunir record was released, on which Ben sang backing vocals. The album also featured members of HIM and Massive Attack.

That year, Ben contributed to the Oceans album, by award-winning J-rock artist, Esprit D'Air. Ben wrote lyrics and vocal melodies and sang guest lead vocals on Dead Zone, which was released as a single on March 11 and publicly lauded by Cradle of Filth guitarist Richard Shaw.

A further collaboration with Esprit D'Air followed in 2023: a cover of Iron Maiden's The Trooper, also featuring ex-Judas Priest vocalist Tim "Ripper" Owens. The track peaked at #1 in the iTunes UK Metal Charts.

Mid 2023, Ben contributed a guitar solo to Khalil Turk & Friends' Don't Surrender, featuring Robin McAuley (Michael Schenker) and Rudy Sarzo (Quiet Riot, Ozzy Osbourne and Whitesnake).

2024 saw the release of Ovdan by Tomorrow's Rains, on which Ben composed and recorded guitar parts onTurnaround (Gothic Rock Version), featuring Michael Denner of Mercyful Fate / King Diamond. The album also featured cameos by Xmal Deutschland and Mayhem.

For Christmas 2024, Ricky Warwick released All I Want for Christmas... Is Christmas!, featuring Def Leppard frontman Joe Elliot and The Cult's guitarist, Billy Duffy. Having toured extensively with Warwick, Christo appeared in the official video as lead guitarist and backing vocalist.

Warwick's fourth full-length solo album, Blood Ties, followed in March 2025, and featured a co-write (Crocodile Tears), lead guitar and backing vocal duties (Crocodile Tears, Rise and Grind, Wishing Your Life Away) from Christo. The record was produced by Keith Nelson (Buckcherry) and featured cameos from Billy Duffy, Charlie Starr and Lita Ford and reached number 25 in the mainstream UK album charts.

== Equipment and endorsements ==
Christo uses Gibson & Fender guitars, Kemper amplifiers, RotoSound strings, DiMarzio pick-ups and InTune guitar picks, with clothing endorsements from Alexander McQueen and Dr Martens.

== Recorded work ==
The following represent the body of recorded work with which Christo has been involved:

Date	Band	Title	Format	Label
1997	Disrupt	D.D.K.	E.P.	Clocktower
1998	KAT>DNA	13%/Myrrh	Single	(Self Release)
1999	AKO	Cover My Eyes	E.P.	(Self Release)
2000	AKO	Fragments of Reason	E.P.	(Self Release)
2001	AKO	Find Yourself	Album	Trash City
2002	AKO	Tomorrow Night's Regret	E.P.	Naked Ambition
2004	AKO	The Last Goodbye	Single	Naked Ambition
2005	Ben Christo	At The Brink	Single	(Self Release)
2008	Night By Night	Just Tonight	E.P.	(Self Release)
2009	Night By Night	Can't Walk Away	E.P.	(Self Release)
2013	Night By Night	Tune Out the Static	E.P.	Sun Hill Production
2014	Anzi Destruction	Black Dog Bias	Album	Chemical Music Enterprises
2014	Night By Night	NxN	Album	Sun Hill Production/Cargo Records
2014	Night By Night	A Thousand Lies	Single	Sun Hill Production/Cargo Records
2017	Diamond Black	Sorrow	Single	(Self Release)
2017	Pig	Prey and Obey	EP	Metropolis Records
2018	Pig	Risen	Album	Metropolis Records
2018	Diamond Black	Ghost in the Glass	Single	(Self Release)
2019	Nathan Gray	Live at Dechenhöhle Iserlohn	Album	End Hits Records
2019	Diamond Black	The Scarlet	Single	Cargo Records
2019	Nathan Gray / Jesse Barnett	Split	EP	End Hits Records
2019	Nathan Gray	Never Alone	Single	End Hits Records
2020	Nathan Gray	Working Title	Album	End Hits Records
2020	Passion	Passion	Album	Frontiers Records
2020	Noa & Lev	Together On Our Own	Single	LMH Records
2020	Diamond Black	If You Kill My Demons	Single	Cargo Records
2020	AKO	The Death of Us	Single	Trash City/Cherry Red Records
2021	Lord of the Lost	Judas	Album	Napalm Records
2021	Mercury Circle	Killing Moons	Album	Noble Demon
2021	Caroline Blind	Tribe - The Remixes	EP	Motherofskye Creations
2021	Roxville	Fallen From Grace	Album	Rox Muzic
2022	Esprit D'Air	Oceans	Album	Starstorm Records
2022	Esprit D'Air	Dead Zone	Single	Starstorm Records
2022	IANAI	Sunir	Album	Svart Records
2023	Plasmata	You Call Him The Devil (Ten Bells - Christo Version)	Single	Plasmata
2023	NFD	Surrender to My Will (Ben Christo Insurgent Version)	Single	Gothic Citadel Records
2023	Diamond Black	Through the Misery	Single	Cargo Records
2023	The 69 Eyes	Death of Darkness	Single	Atomic Fire Records
2023	Esprit D'Air	The Trooper (feat. Tim "Ripper" Owens & Ben Christo)	Single	Starstorm Records
2023	Khalil Turk & Friends	Turkish Delight II	Album	Escape Music
2024	Tomorrow's Rain	Ovdan	Album	AOP Records
2024	Diamond Black, Chris Harms	In Venom	Single	Shadow Cast
2025	Diamond Black	Dark Anthems	Single	Shadow Cast
2025	Diamond Black	Fall Into the Silence	Single	Shadow Cast
2025	Ricky Warwick	Rise And Grind	Single	Earache Records
2025	Ricky Warwick	Blood Ties	Single	Earache Records
2025	Diamond Black	Dark Anthems	EP	Shadow Cast
2025	Anne Bennett feat. Ben Christo	Closing the Dark	Single	Anne Bennett Music
2026	Locus Noir	Cemetery Youth	Single	Listenable Records
