= Night By Night =

Night by Night
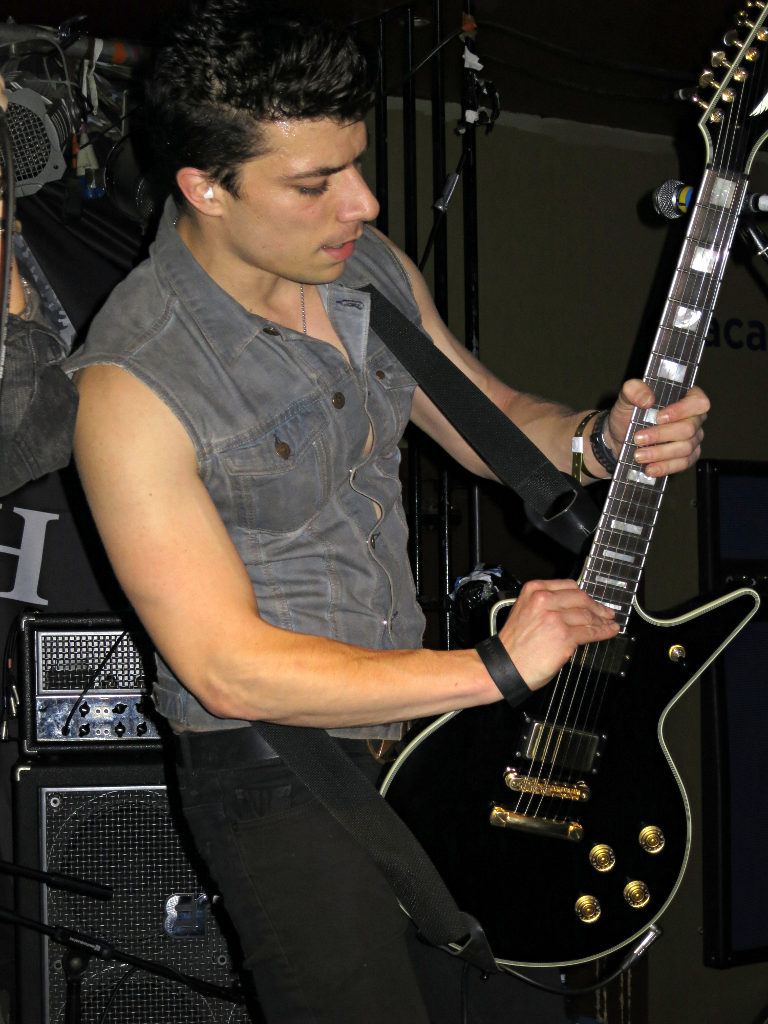
- Ben Christo performing with Night By Night in 2014

Background information
- Origin: UK
- Genres: Hard rock
- Years active: 2008 – present
- Labels: Sun Hill Production distributed by Cargo Records (UK)
- Members: Ben Christo; Jonny Thornton; Tom Daniel; Damien Diablo; Henry Rundell
- Past members: Daniel Rossall; Iain Frisk; Moyano de Diego
- Website: nxnofficial.com

Night by Night is a British hard rock band founded in 2008 by Ben Christo (guitarist of The Sisters Of Mercy) and Jonny Thornton. The band's music style is that of a modern take on the classic 80's bands such as Def Leppard with its dual guitars and three-part vocal harmonies.

== Early years (2008–2011) ==
The original line up with Ben Christo as lead singer/guitarist, bassist Jonny Thornton, guitarist Iain Frisk and Moyano de Diego on drums toured Europe from late 2008, notably supporting Alannah Myles. Jonny Thornton appeared in the July 2010 issue of Bass Guitar magazine discussing his on stage equipment with Night by Night.

Following the introduction of a new guitarist (Tom Daniel) and drummer (Damien Diablo) in 2010, the band expanded to a five-piece with temporary vocalist Willy Norton (Neonfly) leading to a search for a permanent lead singer. This culminated in Daniel Rossall being selected for lead vocals in 2011.

In June 2011, Ben Christo was interviewed about the band's forthcoming EP for Fireworks Melodic Rock Magazine which appeared in issue 47 along with the band's track 'Can't Walk Away' included in the magazine's cover CD.

== 2012–present ==
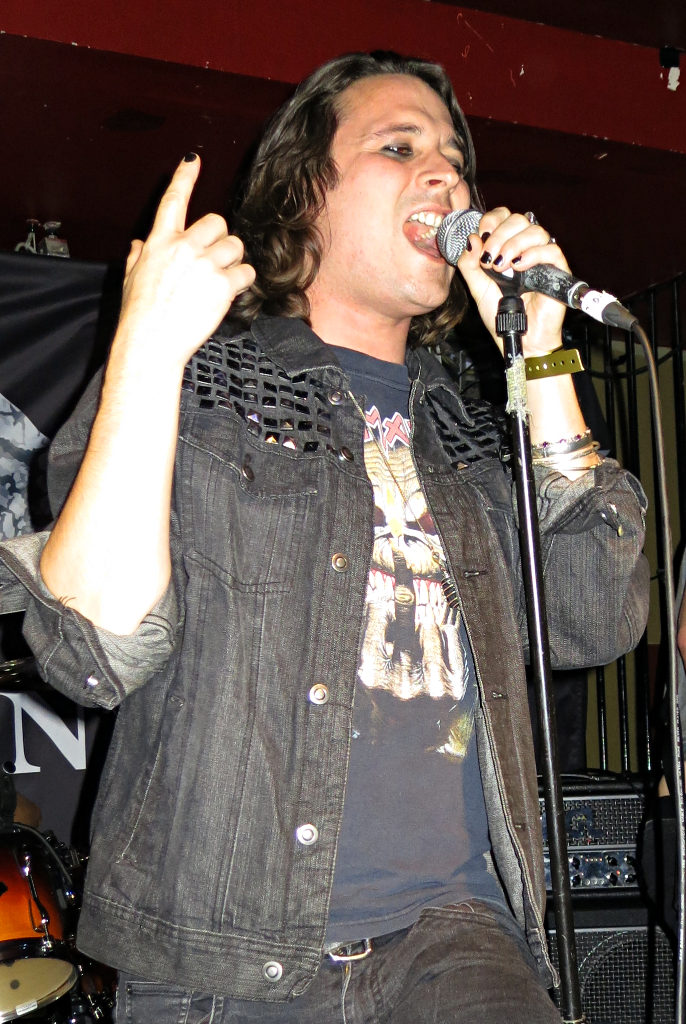
Henry Rundell performing in London with Night By Night

Night by Night recorded its debut album with producer Romesh Dodangoda in late 2012. Prior to leaving the band, Daniel Rossall was interviewed about Night by Night in the December 2012 issue of Classic Rock Presents AOR.

The band carried out a UK tour supporting Jettblack in 2012. and a performance at the sixth Hard Rock Hell festival held in October 2012 at Gwynedd, North Wales. Henry Rundell, former singer for Voodoo Six, joined Night By Night in late 2012.

In March 2013, Night By Night was awarded single/EP of the year with "Time To Escape" at the 2013 Pure Rawk Awards.

Jonny Thornton appeared in the October 2012 issue of Bass Guitar magazine revealing the musical influences on the band.

In June 2013, the band members received a sponsorship from fashion house Bolongaro Trevor for stage clothing in time for the shooting of The Moment video.

In September 2013, the band supported Y&T on a UK Tour.

In early 2014, Night by Night signed to Sun Hill Production, a Swedish-based label.

In March 2014, Europe played four dates in their homeland of Sweden and were supported solely by Night by Night.

In March 2015 the band announced that they had amicably parted ways with Henry Rundell, and would be seeking a new singer. Daniel Leigh of New Device filled in to help fulfill existing performance commitments.

== Band members ==
=== Current members ===
- Ben Christo – guitars, vocals (2008–present)
- Jonny Thornton – bass, backing vocals (2008–present)
- Tom Daniel – guitars (2010–present)
- Damian Diablo – drums (2010–present)

=== Former members ===
- Iain Frisk – guitars, backing vocals (2008–2010)
- Moyano de Diego – drums (2008–2010)
- Daniel Rossall – lead vocals (2011–2012)
- Henry Rundell – lead vocals (2012–2015)
- Daniel Leigh – lead vocals (2015; touring)

== Discography ==
=== Albums ===
- N×N : 2014

01. Time To Escape
02. Holding Onto Holding On
03. Can't Walk Away
04. Everywhere Tonight
05. Siren
06. A Thousand Lies
07. It's Not Faith
08. The Moment
09. If Only
10. Never Die Again

=== Singles / EPs ===
- Just Tonight : 2008
- Can't Walk Away / The Moment / It's Not Faith : 2010
- Time To Escape / The Moment : 2012
- Tune Out The Static (Time To Escape / If Only / The Moment) : 2013
- A Thousand Lies 2014
