= Katariina Souri =

Finnish playmate and writer (born 1968)

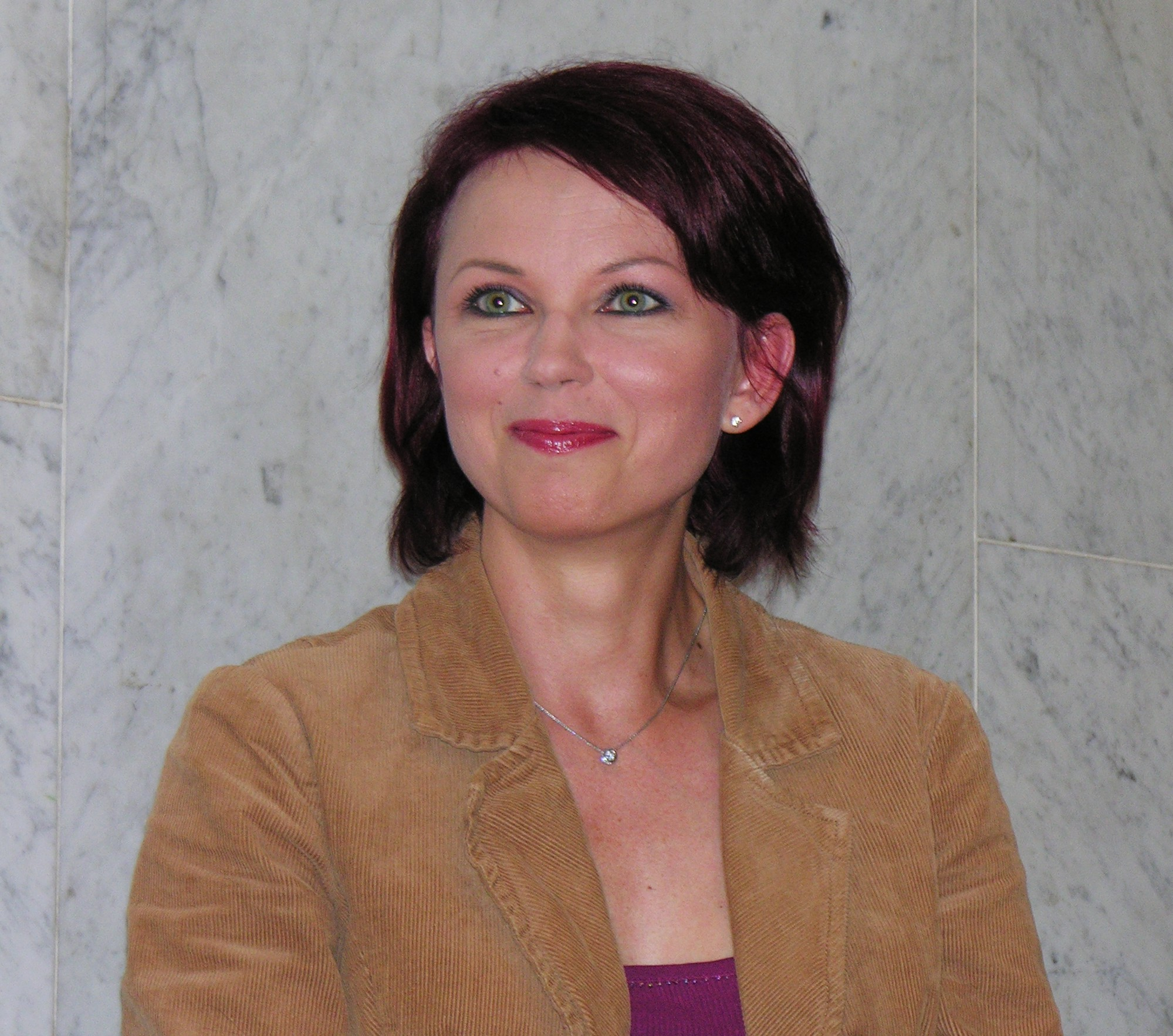
- Souri in 2008

Playboy centerfold appearance
- December 1988
- Preceded by: Pia Reyes
- Succeeded by: Fawna MacLaren

Personal details
- Born: 27 October 1968 (age 57) Helsinki, Finland
- Height: 5 ft 6 in (1.68 m)

Katariina Souri (born Minna Katariina "Kata" Kärkkäinen; 27 October 1968) is a Finnish author, artist, columnist and Playboy's Playmate of the Month for December, 1988. On January 25, 2010, she announced that she changed her name to Katariina Souri.

Katariina Souri married Finnish rock musician Anzi Destruction in 2010. The couple divorced in 2012 but continued living together.

== Novels ==
- Minä ja Morrison, 1999. Also a feature film (2001).
- Vangitse minut vapaaksi, 2001.
- Tulikärpäsiä, 2004. (autobiographical)
- Jumalasta seuraava, 2006.
- Kahdeksas huone, 2008.

== Discography ==
- I Need Love / Lonely Eyes, single by Kata, Bang Trax Finland 1989

== See also ==
- List of people in Playboy 1980–1989

Kimberley Conrad	Kari Kennell	Susie Owens	Eloise Broady	Diana Lee	Emily Arth
Terri Lynn Doss	Helle Michaelsen	Laura Richmond	Shannon Long	Pia Reyes	Kata Kärkkäinen
