= Pia Reyes =

Filipino model and actor

Playboy centerfold appearance
- November 1988
- Preceded by: Shannon Long
- Succeeded by: Kata Kärkkäinen

Pia Reyes (born July 3, 1964) is a Filipino American model and actress.

== Life ==
Reyes graduated class of 1982 at Haverford High School. She was the November 1988 Playboy Playmate of the Month, and appeared in the 1993 cult horror film Return of the Living Dead 3 and Steven Seagal's On Deadly Ground (1994), among other projects.

Reyes was once married to convicted French con artist, Christophe Rocancourt, with whom she has a son, Zeus. On April 27, 2001 she and Rocancourt were arrested in Oak Bay, British Columbia, Canada. Rocancourt was charged with fraud, but Reyes was immediately released after authorities determined that she had no involvement in her husband's fraudulent activities.

She later relocated to New York and enrolled in 2009 at the NYU School of Professional and Continuing Studies Portfolio Management Advanced Certificate Program. She finished with the Advanced Certificate in Portfolio Management.

== See also ==
- List of people in Playboy 1980–89

Kimberley Conrad	Kari Kennell	Susie Owens	Eloise Broady	Diana Lee	Emily Arth
Terri Lynn Doss	Helle Michaelsen	Laura Richmond	Shannon Long	Pia Reyes	Kata Kärkkäinen
