= Raining Rock =

Studio album by Jettblack
- Released: August 7, 2012
- Genre: Hard rock, glam metal
- Length: 50:50
- Label: Spinefarm Records

Jettblack chronology
Get Your Hands Dirty (2010)	Raining Rock (2012)	Disguises (2015)

Raining Rock is the second studio album from Jettblack, released through Spinefarm Records.

== Reception ==
Music Enthusiast Magazine wrote, "Whether it’s the party rocking “Something About This Girl”, the standout ballad “Black Gold”, or the fast paced “Temptation”, the entire album completely dominates".

== Track listing ==
1. "Intro" - 1:09
2. "Raining Rock" - 3:43
3. "Less Torque, More Thrust" - 3:41
4. "Prison Of Love" - 4:05
5. "System" - 3:59
6. "Black Gold" - 7:10
7. "Something About This Girl" - 3:43
8. "Sunshine" - 3:19
9. "Temptation" - 3:53
10. "Never Gonna Give It Up" - 3:17
11. "Inbetween Lovers" - 3:57
12. "Side Of The Road" - 3:31
13. "The Sweet And The Brave" - 5:32
14. "Raining Rock" (feat. Udo Dirkschneider) - "3:42" [Bonus Track]

== Personnel ==
- Will Stapleton - vocals & guitars
- Jon Dow - vocals & guitars
- Tom Wright - bass
- Matt Oliver - drums

Additional musicians:

- Udo Dirkschneider - co-vocals on #14
