= Christophe Rocancourt =

French imposter

- Born: Christophe Thierry Rocancourt; 16 July 1967 (age 59); Honfleur, Calvados, France
- Other names: Christopher Rocancourt; Eric Rockefeller; Christopher Reyes; Christopher De Laurentiis; Christopher de la Renta; Christopher Loren; Christopher Lloyd; Fabien Ortuna; Prince Galitzine Christo; Michael van Hoven
- Occupations: Impostor, Confidence man
- Spouse(s): Gry Park; Pia Reyes (1996–?)
- Children: 3
- Parent(s): Daniel Rocancourt & Annick Villers

Christophe Thierry Daniel Rocancourt colloquially Christopher Rocancourt (born 16 July 1967), is a French impostor and confidence man who scammed affluent people by masquerading in turn as a French nobleman, the heir to the Rockefeller family or family member of a celebrity.

== Early life and education ==
Rocancourt was born 16 July 1967 in Honfleur, France, to Daniel Rocancourt, a financially destitute painter, who suffered from alcoholism and unemployment, and Annick Rocancourt (née Villars). She was 17 when his father married one month after he was born. Rocancourt confirmed to Dateline NBC in a 2006 broadcast that his mother sometimes worked as a prostitute. He has a younger sister, Angelina.

== Later life ==
His first big con was made in Paris, where he faked the deed to a property that he did not own, which he then "sold" for US$1.4 million.

Making his way to the United States, Rocancourt used at least a dozen aliases, and got the rich and powerful to invest in his schemes, he told Dateline, by tapping into their greed. He convinced them that he, too, was rich by paying for their lavish dinners in cash. He once estimated to Dateline that his various schemes/ventures netted him at least US$40 million, but this cannot be confirmed.

In Los Angeles, he pretended to be a movie producer, ex-boxing champion or venture capitalist; he also claimed to be the illegitimate son of Sophia Loren, the nephew of Oscar de la Renta and Dino De Laurentiis, and he associated himself with various celebrities, living for a time with Mickey Rourke, and apparently convincing actor Jean-Claude Van Damme to produce his next movie. He was also in talks with Jermaine Jackson to develop a line of fragrances inspired by Michael Jackson songs.

Rocancourt, using the name Christopher De Laurentiis, married Gry Park in 1992, with whom he had a child. He married Playboy model Pia Reyes in May 1996, and they had a son, Zeus. Beside being married to Pia Reyes, according to the press, he lived with Playboy model Rhonda Rydell for six months; Rydell did not know Rocancourt was married, and said he had told her he was French nobility, the son of a countess.

In 1997 police raided Rocancourt's hotel suite, and in 1998 he was arrested for involvement in a shootout before he jumped bail.

In 1999 he was freed of charges of forging passports. He was arrested in 2000 in the Hamptons for an unpaid hotel bill.

After posting bail, he again fled and relocated to Canada where he assumed the identity of Grand Prix driver Michael van Hoven. On April 27, 2001 he and Reyes were detained in Victoria, British Columbia, Canada, and Rocancourt was later charged with defrauding an elderly couple; Reyes was released after convincing authorities that she had no part in the scam, nor even any idea of her husband's criminal activities. Rocancourt served a year in prison before being extradited to New York and pleading guilty to charges of theft, grand larceny, smuggling, bribery, perjury and fraud against 19 victims. In September 2003, the plea resulted in a fine of $9 million, an order to pay $1.2 million in restitution and a term of three years and ten months in federal prison.

While being held in Canada, Rocancourt wrote an autobiography in which he ridiculed his victims. In Switzerland, police have connected him with a jewel theft, and at one point barred him from the country for 14 years; this ban expired in 2016.

Rocancourt returned to Paris in October 2005 after completing his prison sentence. He lived with former Miss France Sonia Rolland, and they had a daughter together, named Tess. They announced their split in early 2008.

In July 2009, French filmmaker Catherine Breillat accused Rocancourt of scamming her out of €700,000. Breillat, who was diagnosed with a cerebrovascular disease in 2004, accused him of taking advantage of her due to her mental incapacity. Due to this event, the film Bad Love, with Rocancourt and model Naomi Campbell, was cancelled. Breillat told a French journalist that her first meeting with Rocancourt was the worst day of her life, even worse than the day when she was diagnosed with her cerebrovascular disease. In 2012, Rocancourt was convicted of "abus de faiblesse" ("abuse of weakness") for taking Breillat's money, and sentenced to 16 months in prison.

In October 2014, he was arrested along with his lawyer, 23-year-old girlfriend, and a member of the French police that he allegedly bribed to supply him with genuine passports and visas to be sold on for extortionate sums to illegal migrants.

== In popular culture ==
The American Court TV (now TruTV) television series Mugshots released an episode on Christophe Rocancourt titled Chris Rocancourt - A French Con, aired in 2013.

Catherine Breillat's 2014 film Abuse of Weakness presents a lightly fictionalized depiction of her relationship with Rocancourt.

72 Hours: True Crime S2E2, "The Hustler," is about Christophe Rocancourt and his crimes in Canada.

The American TV show The Unexplained discussed his abilities and how he manipulated people.

The Investigation Discovery show Vanity Fair Confidential also covered his story in the first season sixth episode.

The Law & Order: Criminal Intent season 1 episode "The Extra Man" was inspired by Christophe Rocancourt.

In 2024, David Serero directed and produced the official biopic with Christophe Rocancourt: "ROCANCOURT, The Film," which was released in movie theaters in France and Europe and premiered at the 2024 Cannes Film Festival.
