= Hard Rock Hell =

Music festival in Pwllheli, Wales

- Genre: Heavy metal, hard rock, rock
- Dates: October/November/December
- Locations: Haven Holidays, Hafan y Môr Holiday Park, Pwllheli, Gwynedd, Wales
- Years active: 2007–present
- Website: hardrockhell.com

Hard Rock Hell is a three day music festival held at Vauxhall Holiday resort, Great Yarmouth. It was previously held at Hafan y Môr Holiday Park, Pwllheli, Gwynedd, North Wales, and up until 2011 at Pontin's Holiday Village, Prestatyn, Wales. Holding the festival in a holiday camp gives the organisers pre-built venues and stages and because of the on-site accommodation allows them to hold a multi day festival over winter/spring months when outdoor camping is not desirable. The first edition of the festival was held at Butlins Holiday Camp, Minehead, England, but the festival relocated to its current location in 2008.

== Hard Rock Hell I : The Winter Ball ==
The first edition of the Hard Rock Hell festival was subtitled "The Winter Ball". Held at Butlins Holiday Camp, Minehead, England over Friday 9th and Saturday 10 November 2007. The headliners for the first edition of the festival were Cradle of Filth and Twisted Sister.

Stage One
| Friday | Saturday |
| Tokyo Dragons; Crucified Barbara; Girlschool; Vixen; Lauren Harris; Zodiac Mindwarp and the Love Reaction; Spit Like This | Diamond Head; Tesla; UFO; Twisted Sister; Saxon; Fastway; McQueen |

Stage Two
| Friday | Saturday |
| Cradle of Filth; My Dying Bride; Tiamat; Chthonic; Amenti | Grand Magus; Finntroll; Sabbat; 3 Inches Of Blood; Turisas |

Stage Three
| Friday | Saturday |
| Tolerance; Nemhain; Forever Never; Romeo Must Die; Gu Medicine; Zero Cipher; Feicomodo; Avenger; Sacred Mother Tongue; SKWAD; Immanis | Raven; Beyond The Grave; Brazabon; 4 bands in Battle of the Bands competition |

== Hard Rock Hell II : The Dragons Ball ==
The second edition of the Hard Rock Hell festival was subtitled "The Dragons Ball". Held at Pontin's Holiday Village, Prestatyn, Wales over Friday 5th and Saturday 6 December 2008, the headliners for the festival were Thin Lizzy and Black Label Society.

Stage One: Classic Rock
| Friday | Saturday |
| Tigertailz; Doro; Thin Lizzy; Budgie; Benedictum; Glyder | Viking Skull; Wildhearts; Black Label Society; Clutch; Orange Goblin; Panic Cell; Hawkwind; Litmus |

Stage Two
| Friday: Metal Hammer / Radio 1 | Saturday: Born Again / Porshamar |
| Cancer Bats; Johnny Truant; Ghost of a Thousand; The Plight; Textures; Black Hole; Hexes | Blitzkrieg; Firewind; Powerquest; This is Menace; Ravenscreed; Outcry Fire; Alestorm; Korpiklaani; Battlelore; Waysted; Tygers of Pan Tang; Praying Mantis; Pride Tiger; Spit Like This |

Stage Three
| Friday: Young Blood | Saturday: Clive Aid |
| Jett Black; Attica Rage; Heaven's Basement; Big Linda; Get Vegas; Lethargy | Chariot; Warrior Soul; Dope; Pig Iron; Million$Reload; Hecate Enthroned; Beholder |

== Hard Rock Hell III : The Vikings Ball ==
The third edition of the Hard Rock Hell festival was subtitled "The Vikings Ball". Held at Pontin's Holiday Village, Prestatyn, Wales over Friday 4th and Saturday 5 December 2009 with a pre-event show on Thursday 3 December, the headliners for the festival were Monster Magnet and Queensrÿche.

Thursday 3 December
| Stage 2 | Stage 3 |
| Weapon; G.M.T. Beholder; Marshall Law; Attica Rage | Raw Glory; New Device; Riot: Noise |

Friday 4 December
| Stage 1: Hard Rock Heaven | Stage 2: Porshamar / TotalRock | Stage 3: Young Blood |
| Sonata Arctica; Monster Magnet; Terrorvision; Ratt; Gun; Logan | Four Wheel Drive; Tribal Law; Winterborn; Edens Curse; Sons Of Merrick; Black Spiders; Hysterica; Delain; Korplikanni; Die Apokalyptishien Reiter; Waylander | Hanging Doll; Dead Against The Rest; 9 X Dead; Remedy; Voodoo Johnson; Arthemis; Imicus |

Saturday 5 December
| Stage 1: Trick Or Treat | Stage 2: Metal Aid / Metal On Metal | Stage 3: Old Skool / N.W.O.B.H.M. |
| Spit Like This; Lauren Harris; New York Dolls; Queensrÿche; W.A.S.P. Rogue Male; Marya Roxx | Toxic Holocaust; Skeleton Witch; Goatwhore; Onslaught; Susperia; Demon; Angelwitch; Witchfynder; Quireboys; Tigertailz; Girlschool; The Glitterati; Pig Iron | Hanging Doll; Hammerhead; Elixr; Saracen; Marseille; Tyson Dog; Dumpys Rusty Nuts; Cloven Hoof |

== Hard Rock Hell IV ==
The 4th annual Hard Rock Well was held at Pontin's Holiday Village in Prestatyn, the line-up included Airbourne, 9xDead, Helloween, UFO, Uriah Heep, Skid Row and MSG.

== Hard Rock Hell V ==
The 5th edition of Hard Rock Hell was held at Pontins in Prestatyn, the theme was Village of the Damned, the line-up included Airbourne, Diamond Head, Enuff Z'Nuff, FM, Helloween, JettBlack, LA Guns, Lizzy Borden, MSG, Paul D'ianno, Pretty Boy Floyd, Saxon, Skid Row, Stratovarius, UFO and Uriah Heep.

== Hard Rock Hell VI : A Fistful Of Rock ==
Hard Rock Hell VI took place on 29 November to 3 December 2012 at Hafan Y Môr Holiday Park, Pwllheli, Gwynedd, North Wales, LL53 6HJ.

| Thursday | Friday | Saturday | Sunday |
|---|---|---|---|
| McCoy; TNT; Tigertailz; Toadstool; Night By Night; Bad Touch; Krusher | Sebastian Bach; Molly Hatchet; Grave Digger; Blackfoot; Dan Baird; Vicious Rumors; Skinny Molly; Electric Mary; Ten; Dante Fox; Serpentine; Die So Fluid; The Burning Crows; Circus Town; Havana Rocks; BlackWolf; The Idol Dead; Estrella; Chemicals Of Democracy | Testament; Ugly Kid Joe; The Quireboys; Primal Fear; The Dogs D'Amour; Little Caesar; Graveyard; I Am I Electric Boys; Rocky Shades' Wildside Riot; Jettblack; Bonafide; Tytan; More; Soldier; Overdrive; Gaskin; Chaser; The Handsome Beasts | Buckcherry; The Union; SOiL; Red White N' Blues; Dr. Feelgood; Fozzy; Breed 77; Kobra And The Lotus; Pig Iron; Stray; Slam Cartel; Savage; Trucker Diablo |

== Hard Rock Hell VII: Cirque Du Rock ==
Took place from 28 November to 1 December 2013 in Hafan y Môr Holiday Park, Pwllheli, Gwynedd, North Wales.

== Hard Rock Hell VIII: HRH Helloween (sic) ==
Returns to Haven Holidays, Hafan y Môr Holiday Park, Pwllheli, Gwynedd, North Wales from Thursday 13th to Sunday 16 November 2014.

The event completely sold out on 13/05/14.

W.A.S.P. return to HRH to headline the Friday night, and Blue Öyster Cult top the bill on Saturday, other acts announced include M.S.G., Y&T, Diamond Head, Bonafide, Electric Mary, Krokus, Vardis, Grifters, Heavy Metal Kids, and Carousel Vertigo. The latest additions are Big Elf, Truckfighters, Witchrider, Massive, Chemia, The Black Marbles, Thundermother, The Brew, Piston and Buffalo Summer. More bands will be announced in due course.

== Hard Rock Hell X: HRH 10th Anniversary ==
Returned to Haven Holidays, Hafan y Môr Holiday Park, Pwllheli, Gwynedd, North Wales from Thursday 10 November to Saturday 12 November 2016

Bands included Ugly Kid Joe, Ratt, Living Colour, Hayseed Dixie, Last In Line, Graham Bonnet Band, Phil Campbell’s All Starr Band, Ricky Warwick & The Fighting Hearts, Bonfire, Sweet Savage, The Vintage Caravan, Lionize, The Treatment, Massive, The Amorettes, Vodun, Aaron Buchanan & The Cult Classics, Hand Of Dimes, The Last Vegas, Dear Lord Hailmary, Tequila Mockingbyrd, Black Aces, 4Bitten, Joan of Arc, Syteria, The Mojo Sinners, Welcome Back Delta, Dorje, The Texas Flood, Chase The Ace, Skam, Crowsaw, Theia, Departed, and Soil.

== Hard Rock Hell XI: Knights of the Dark Order ==
Airbourne, Black Star Riders, Dee Snider, Idlewar, Y&T, Lynch Mob, The New Roses and Tyketto, along with home grown talent including Bad Touch, Gun, Buffalo Summer, Chasing Dragons and Wayward Sons rocked the masses at Hard Rock Hell XI, which was held at Camp HRH in Pwllheli, North Wales.

Saturday night headliners Black Star Riders describe themselves as "lifers in an industry less secure than a secret in a soap opera." Formed from recent members of Thin Lizzy, Black Star Riders have been described as the next step in the evolution of the legendary band.

The Graveltones are a crowd-rousing two-piece heavy blues/rock and roll band, influenced by great artists such as Captain Beefheart, John Lee Hooker and Queens of The Stone Age.

Wayward Sons were formed last year by Toby Jepson (former frontman of GUN and Little Angels). "I feel I have unfinished business," Toby explained, "stories still left to tell, points to make, noise to create; all of the above." HRH XI is proud to present this established artist’s latest project.

Other acts joining the festival’s super tasty line-up include Toseland, Swiss rockers Sideburn, the big bluesy Southern-tinged rock of Buffalo Summer, psych rockers Goldray, and the descendants of Taint: Hark and the powerful three piece from California Idlewa, Dead City Ruins, Bad Touch, Western Sand, The Blanko, The Brink, King Creature, Black Whiskey, Wicked Stone, Those Damn Crows, King Breaker, Kikamora, Blind River, Chasing Dragons, Bad Dog, Killit, and Beth Blade & the Beautiful Disasters.

These artists join acts already announced for HRH XI: Dee Snider, Airbourne, Reef, Lynch Mob, Y&T, Tyketto, GUN, Von Hertzen Brothers, Black Aces, Burnt Out Wreck, The New Roses, Syron Vanes, Killcode, Florence Black, Syteria, The Jokers, Fire Red Empress, The Cut, and Louder Still.

| Thursday 9 November 2017 | Friday 10 November 2017 | Saturday 11 November 2017 |
|---|---|---|
| Stage 1 Opening Ceremony – 16:45 Ryders Creed – 17:00 – 17:45 Idlewar – 18:00 – 18:50 Killcode – 19:10 – 20:00 Black Aces – 20:20 – 21:20 Wayward Sons – 21:40 – 22:40 Dee Snider – 23:00 – 00:30 Bonga Wonga After Party – 00:30 – 01:30 | Stage 1 Screening of the Airbourne documentary – 12:30 – 13:30 Goldray – 14:00 – 14:50 Syteria – 15:10 – 16:10 The Graveltones – 16:30 – 17:30 The New Roses – 17:50 – 18:50 Tyketto – 19:10 – 20:10 Y&T – 20:30 – 21:45 Airbourne – 22:05 – 00:05 | Stage 1 Screening of '10 Years Of Hell' documentary – 12:00 – 13:15 Buffalo Summer – 13:40 – 14:25 Toseland – 15:10 – 16:00 Von Hertzen Brothers – 16:20 – 17:20 Gun – 17:40 – 18:40 Lynch Mob – 19:00 – 20:00 Reef – 20:20 – 21:45 Black Star Riders – 22:05 – 00:00 |
| | Stage 2 Those Damn Crows – 12:50 – 13:30 Kingbreaker – 13:50 – 14:35 The Jokers – 14:50 – 15:35 Fire Red Empress – 15:55 – 16:40 The Kut – 17:00 – 17:45 Florence Black – 18:00 – 18:45 Kikamora – 19:00 – 19:40 Sideburn – 20:00 – 20:45 Blind River – 21:00 – 21:45 Chasing Dragons – 22:00 – 22:40 Bad Dog – 23:00 – 23:50 Killit – 00:10 – 01:10 Bonga Wonga After Party – 00:15 – 01:30 | Stage 2 Beth Blade And The Beautiful Disasters – 12:00 – 12:30 Western Sand – 12:45 – 13:30 Bad Touch – 13:45 – 14:30 Syron Vanes – 14:45 – 15:30 Burnt Out Wreck – 15:45 – 16:35 Hark – 16:45 – 17:30 Louder Still – 17:45 – 18:30 The Blanco – 18:45 – 19:30 The Brink – 19:45 – 20:30 King Creature – 20:45 – 21:30 Black Whiskey – 21:45 – 22:30 Wicked Stone – 22:45 – 23:45 Dead City Ruins – 00:00 – 01:00 |

== Hard Rock Hell XII: Goes Over The Top ==
Arenas Performance Slot Times

Thursday 8 November 2018 - Stage 1
| 18:00 – 18:40 | Eden's Curse |
| 19:00 – 19:40 | Myke Gray |
| 20:00 – 20:55 | Rock Goddess |
| 21:15 – 22:15 | Phil Campbell & The Bastard Sons |
| 22:35 – 00:15 | Michael Schenker Fest |

Friday 9 November 2018 - Stage 1
| 14:00 – 14:50 | Vambo |
| 15:10 – 16:10 | Thunderstick |
| 16:30 – 17:30 | Blitzkrieg |
| 17:50 – 18:50 | Vintage Caravan |
| 19:10 – 20:10 | Dan Reed Network |
| 20:30 – 21-45 | Girlschool |
| 22:05 – 00:05 | Saxon |

Friday 9 November 2018 - Stage 2
| 12:50 – 13:30 | Dead Man's Whiskey |
| 13:50 – 14:35 | Blind River |
| 14:50 – 15:35 | Renegade Twelve |
| 15:55 – 16:40 | Voodoo Blood |
| 17:00 – 17:45 | VA Rocks |
| 18:00 – 18:45 | Sinside |
| 19:00 – 19:40 | City of Thieves |
| 20:00 – 20:45 | Anchor Lane |
| 21:00 – 21:45 | The Dust Coda |
| 22:00 – 23:00 | Witchfynde |
| 23:15 – 00:15 | SNEW |
| 00:30 – 01:30 | Everyday Heroes |

Saturday 10 November 2018 - Stage 1
| 13:40 – 14:25 | Kaleb McKane |
| 15:00 – 16:00 | Hawklords |
| 16:20 – 17:20 | Massive |
| 17:40 – 18:40 | Tygers Of Pan Tang |
| 19:00 – 20:00 | John Coghlan's Quo |
| 20:20 – 21:45 | Femme Fatale |
| 22:05 – 00:00 | The Dead Daisies |

Saturday 10 November 2018 - Stage 2
| 12:00 – 12:30 | The Bad Flowers |
| 12:45 – 13:30 | Ryders Creed |
| 13:45 – 14:30 | The Dukes Of Bordello |
| 14:45 – 15:30 | The Rising Souls |
| 15:45 – 16:35 | Stand Amongst Giants |
| 16:45 – 17:30 | Black Star Bullet |
| 17:45 – 18:30 | Walkway |
| 18:45 – 19:30 | Smoking Martha |
| 19:45 – 20:30 | The Loved & Lost |
| 20:45 – 21:30 | Riders To Ruin |
| 21:45 – 22:30 | Red Hawk Rising |
| 22:45 – 23:45 | Demon |
| 00:00 – 01:00 | The Wild! |

== Hard Rock Hell XIII : Rise Of The Dead ==
Held at Camp HRH, Vauxhall Holiday Park, Acle New Road, Great Yarmouth. NR30 1TB

https://clashfinder.com/s/hrhxiii/?user=0rz0hz.yn
