= Fireworks (magazine) =

British firework magazine

Fireworks is a British magazine about fireworks, aimed at enthusiasts and pyrotechnic professionals.

== History and profile ==
The magazine began life in February 1982 as a photocopied newsletter for firework enthusiasts. At the time, the number of British firework companies was in sharp decline and their tangible remains were being lost or destroyed. Fireworks was also intended to record the histories of these companies, firework celebrations and print readers' nostalgic recollections of Guy Fawkes' Night.

Fireworks includes colour pictures of early British fireworks and celebrations, including displays for Guy Fawkes Night.

The Letters page is a forum for debate, for instance the recent discovery of nineteenth century flares by the UK coastguard service, and the new Amberley firework museum. The magazine is in colour throughout, and pictures are of displays, events, and people as well as popular British fireworks from the 1930s to the 1970s. Pictorial matter includes cartoons (Sturtz, Fireworks' resident cartoonist among others). Some cartoons are historical. There is a once-a-year directory of firework companies; snippets of firework news in Round Up; and safety information and news which provide firers with the information they require to safely fire displays.

Major events, both current and historical, are covered in articles, and there are profiles of prominent figures, as well as a hall of fame.

The magazine's articles are written by notable figures in the firework industry and the firework world generally, including Reverend Ron Lancaster (author of Fireworks: Principles and Practice, an authoritative work for firework people), who has paid tribute to the magazine's work to preserve firework history in that book.

The current issues are very different from the early stapled sheets, and the magazine is commercial in appearance. The magazine has had a part to play in the foundation of a firework museum, the formation of a family of firework collectors and admirers, and the presentation of fireworks as an acceptable form of enjoyment by responsible people aware of safety issues and determined to improve safety wherever possible.
