= Anzi Destruction =

Finnish rock musician

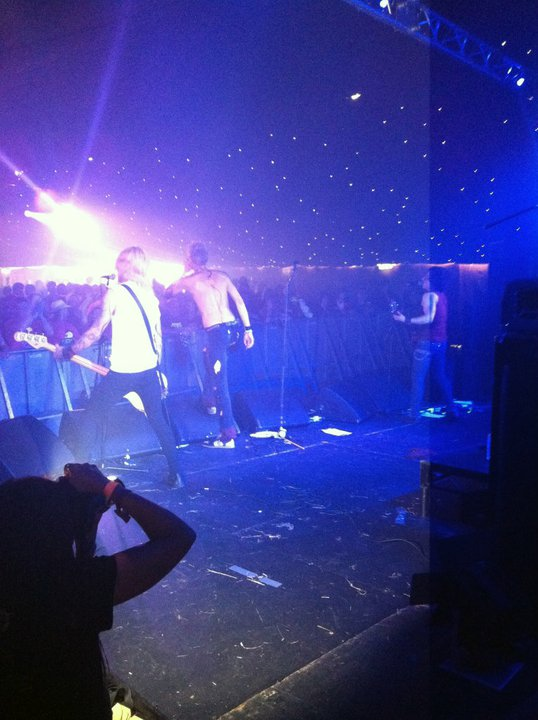
- Anzi Destruction performing at Guilfest UK 2011

Background information
- Born: 1982; Helsinki, Finland
- Genres: Hard rock, punk rock, glam rock, industrial rock, garage rock, metal
- Occupations: Singer-songwriter; musician; producer
- Instruments: Vocals, guitar, harmonica, synth
- Years active: 1997–present

Anzi Destruction (born Antero Koskikallio; 1982) is a Finnish rock musician. He is known for his energic and wild live shows that feature fire breathing. He was the lead singer of Stereo Junks! (2003–2010). Prior to joining Stereo Junks!, he played guitar in the glam/punk band Plastic Tears in the late 1990s. In 2001, he released two solo EPs Shoot I and Shoot II. In 2010, he joined The Salvation as its lead singer. His first full-length solo album, High Clash Motherf***er, was released in April 2011. It was followed in 2015 by the album Black Dog Bias. Anzi produced an album "The Book Of V" for the alternative metal band V For Violence together with producer Hiili Hiilesmaa in 2015.

Destruction married Katariina Souri in 2010. The couple divorced in 2012. He currently lives in London.

== Discography ==
Solo

- Shoot I – EP (2001)
- Shoot II – EP (2001)
- High Clash Motherf***er – CD (2011)
- Black Dog Bias – CD (2015)
- Fuel for Napoleon – Digi (2019)
- Walk the Mine – Single (2020)

The Salvation

- Auto Destructive (2013)

Stereo Junks!

- Shut Up 'N' Sit Down – EP (2003)
- Living Bomb – CD (2003)
- China White – Single (2004)
- Suicide Angels – EP (2006)
- Chemistry – EP (2009)

Plastic Tears

- Stranded in Rock 'N' Roll – CD (1999)

V For Violence

- The Book Of V (2015)
