= Jettblack =

English rock band (2007–2017)

- Origin: England
- Genres: Hard rock, glam metal, heavy metal
- Years active: 2007–2017
- Label: Spinefarm
- Past members: Will Stapleton; Tom Wright; Matt Oliver; Jon Dow
- Website: Jettblackuk.com (Archived - 5 April 2015)

Jettblack were an English rock band from High Wycombe, England. They have released three studio albums, Get Your Hands Dirty (2010), Raining Rock (2012), and Disguises (2015).

== History ==
Originally known as skate rock band Skirtbox, who released two albums between 2000 and 2003.

2008 took them touring with Airbourne and playing a variety of high-profile summer festivals such as T in the Park, finishing off the year headlining the third stage at Hard Rock Hell Festival.

In 2009, Jettblack played sets at Download Festival and Relentless Boardmasters.

2010 saw Jettblack added for two dates at the London Roundhouse at the end of the Kerrang! Tour. The year also saw the releasing of their debut album, "Get Your Hands Dirty" on 7 June 2010. They previously launched their single at a special gig at the Purple Turtle in Camden, London. This was followed by a number of one-off gigs including supporting Reckless Love at the historic Barfly, Camden and supporting Papa Roach in the Netherlands before returning to the Relentless Boardmasters Festival and a set at the UK leg of Ozzfest. In September, the band rejoined with Finnish Rockers Reckless Love, supporting them on their 'Back to Paradise' UK tour.

In 2011, Jettblack supported Australian rock group Grinspoon in their UK tour before embarking on their own co-headline tour with Heaven's Basement. They then played the Jägermeister Stage at Sonisphere UK 2011 where they were joined on-stage by two female fire-eaters during their song "Two Hot Girls". They also played a number of small acoustic sets at the festival that same day. In September 2011, they played at Merthyr Rock Festival before setting out on another UK in November with Fozzy.

On 30 May 2012 they played their first solo headlining show, at a launch party for their new album to a sold-out crowd at the Borderline in London.

Their second album Raining Rock, was released on 4 June 2012. They had their first full tour as headliners in the UK during October 2012.

== Discography ==
=== Albums ===
- 2010: Get Your Hands Dirty
- 2012: Raining Rock
- 2013: Black Gold (Covers and oddities)
- 2015: Disguises

=== Singles ===
- 2010: "Get Your Hands Dirty"
- 2010: "Two Hot Girls"
- 2010: "When It Comes To Lovin'"
- 2010: "War Between US"
- 2011: "Not Even Love"
- 2011: "Slip It On"
- 2012: "Raining Rock"
- 2012: "Prison of Love"
- 2012: "Black Gold"
- 2012: "Less Torque, More Thrust"
- 2012: "Never Gonna Give It Up"
- 2012: "Something About This Girl"
- 2015: "Explode"
- 2015: "Kick in the Teeth"

=== Video clips ===
- 2010: "Two Hot Girls"
- 2010: "Get Your Hands Dirty"
- 2012: "Raining Rock"
- 2012: "Prison of Love"
- 2015: "Explode"
