= Sun Hill Production =

Swedish production company

- 2009-Present Sunhill. Logo
- Founded: 2009 - present
- Headquarters: Stockholm, Sweden
- Products: Music, Records, Management, Digital, Live entertainment, Motion pictures, Television programs
- Website: Official website

A Sun Hill Production AB — since 2009, commonly referred to as Sun Hill Production — is a Swedish production company in the entertainment industry, including record label, publishing, live entertainment, CD, DVD and Blu-ray productions & management.

== History ==
=== 2009: Founding ===
The company produces music & filmed entertainment as well as live entertainment in Sweden.

=== 2010-2011 ===
"Sun Hill" began its productions with producing and releasing a 3-disc DVD box set with the Swedish multi musician, comedian, linguist icon & songwriter Robert Broberg. This collaboration went on to produce Mr. Brobergs 70th anniversary show for national Swedish TV and on October 26, 2011 this show was later released to DVD & CD. The music can also be found on digital platforms.

Swedish rock band Europe Live! At Shepherd’s Bush, London is another release Sun Hill produced for the DVD and Blu-ray format (both formats included Europe’s first live CD as well). Main concert was filmed at Shepherds Bush in London, U.K. Recording started on December 28, 2009 at Stockholm Ice Stadium to be followed in 2010, September 17 with the band's performance at the amusement park Gröna Lund also in Stockholm. The recordings ended with the main show at Shepherd's Bush. Up on its release in June 2011 it reached nr 1 on the national Swedish sales chart.

After the tragic death of Marcel Jacob, Sun Hill become the natural partner for Marcel's music and his legacy in his own band Talisman.

=== 2012 - 2020 Music ===
"Sun Hill" released Mark Spiro's both albums Care Of My Soul Vol. 1 and Care Of My Soul. Vol. 2, Talisman, with the band's four first albums and continuing Talisman legacy with additional Talisman albums released both on CD and vinyl. Over the years artists like Glenn Hughes, Europe, Robert Broberg, Clif Magness, Brett Walker, Clockwise, Masquerade, Fortune, Southpaw, Coldspell, Erika, to name a few is also found under the label.

In 2019 Marcel Jacob and Pontus Norgren's project Humanimal was re-released to the digital format and CD.

In December 2019 Talisman released the first new song in 12 years, a song called Never Die(A song for Marcel) Talisman reunited for a song in memory for their fallen brother Marcel Jacob who took his own life on July 21, 2009. Any and all proceeds from this recording will to go to suicide awareness and mental illness in cooperation with Suicide Zero.

=== Live entertainment ===
In 2013 "Sun Hill" arranged Michael Schenker and his Temple Of Rock - tour in Sweden. "Sun Hill" also arranged the very first Stockholm Rocks music festival held in the heart of Stockholm, in 2014. Bands like TNT, Santa Cruz, Pretty Maids, Reckless Love, Vandenberg, Gus G, Marty Friedman, Imber, Corroded, Xandria, Avatarium, Joe Lynn Turner, Grand Magus and Allegiance Of Rock among others have performed at the Festival.

In 2014, Sun Hill arranged and was the promoter for "Wings Over Sweden" tour with Swedish rock band Europe where the band performed the album Wings of Tomorrow in full together with selected hits and fan favorites.
