= Re-Constriction Records discography =

Re-Constriction Records released many albums and singles from various bands as well as a number of compilations which were influential in the electronic and Industrial music genres. Below is a complete listing of recordings released by Re-Constriction between its inception and folding. The label dissolved in 1999.

== Key ==
No.	The release's unique catalog number. These are formatted as IPC-000.
CD	Compact disc
CS	Cassette tape
7"	7 inch single
LP	Long play
DVD	Digital versatile disc

== List of releases ==
=== Main discography ===
Re-Constriction Records Catalogue
No.	Year	Artist	Title	Format
001	1992	Diatribe	Nothing	CD
002	1992	Leæther Strip	Penetrate the Satanic Citizen	CD
003	1993	Various artists	The Technotic Effect: A Hard Techno Compilation	CD
004	1993	16volt	Wisdom	CD
005	1993	Numb	Death on the Installment Plan	CD, CS
006	1993	The Clay People	Firetribe	CD
007	1996	Diatribe	Diatribe	CD, CS
008	1993	Vampire Rodents	Lullaby Land	CD
009	1993	Various artists	Shut Up Kitty: A Cyber-Based Covers Compilation	CD
010	1994	Non-Aggression Pact	9mm Grudge	CD
011	1993	Swamp Terrorists	Combat Shock	CD
012	1994	16volt	Skin	CD
013	1995	Killing Floor	Killing Floor	CD, LP
014	1995	SMP	Stalemate	CD
015	1995	The Clay People	The Iron Icon	CD
016	1995	Various artists	Thugs 'n' Kisses	CD
017	1995	Vampire Rodents	Clockseed	CD
018	1995	Apparatus	Apparatus	CD
019	1996	Society Burning	Entropy.Lingua	CD
020	1996	Collide	Beneath the Skin	CD
021	1997	Iron Lung Corp	Big Shiny Spears	CD
022	1996	16volt	LetDownCrush	CD, CS
023	1996	Various artists	Operation Beatbox	CD, CS
024	1999	Non-Aggression Pact	Broadcast-Quality Belligerence	CD
025	1997	Killing Floor	Divide by Zero	CD
026	1997	The Clay People	Stone-Ten Stitches	CD
027	1996	Tinfed	Hypersonic Hyperphonic	CD
028	1997	Christ Analogue	In Radiant Decay	CD
030	1996	Waiting for God	Quarter Inch Thick	CD
031	1998	Various artists	Cyberpunk Fiction: A Synthcore "Soundtrack"	CD
032	1997	Various artists	TV Terror: Felching a Dead Horse	CD
033	1998	Collide	Distort	CD
034	1998	H3llb3nt	Helium	CD
035	1999	Various artists	Nod's Tacklebox o' Fun	CD
036	1997	Society Burning	Tactiq	CD
037	1997	Various artists	Got Moose? Re-Constriction CD Sampler#2	CD
038	2000	Purr Machine	Ging Ging	CD
039	1998	Hexedene	Choking on Lilies	CD
040	1997	Waiting for God	Desipramine	CD
041	1998	Various artists	Songs From the Wasteland (A Tribute to the Mission)	CD

Singles Catalogue
No.	Year	Artist	Title	Format
007	1996	Diatribe	Ultracide/Junkyard	CD
020	1997	Collide	Deep/Violet's Dance	CD
022	1996	16volt	The Dreams That Rot in Your Heart/Two Wires Thin	CD
025	1998	Killing Floor	Come Together	CD
026	1996	The Clay People	Strange Day	CD
028	1996	Christ Analogue	Optima	CD
038	1999	Purr Machine	Speak Clearly	CD

Other releases
No.	Year	Artist	Title	Format
001	1993	Various artists	Assimilation	LP
001	1993	Various artists	Grid Slinger	LP
300	1995	Various artists	Chambermade	CS
400	1996	Various artists	Re-Constriction 10* Year Anniversary	CD
701	1993	Various artists	Ripped Up and So Sedated	7"
	1994	Various artists	Crowbar America	CS
	1995	Various artists	Frostbyte (Re-Constriction Sampler)	CS
002	1997	Various artists	Built for Stomping: A Re-Constriction & Cleopatra Sampler	CD
	1998	Collide	Son of a Preacher Man	VHS

If It Moves... Catalogue
No.	Year	Artist	Title	Format
001	1991	Various artists	Torture Tech Overdrive	CD
002	1992	Various artists	The Cyberflesh Conspiracy	CD
003	1993	Various artists	Rivet Head Culture	CD
004	1994	Various artists	Scavengers in the Matrix	CD
