= Re-Constriction 10* Year Anniversary =

Compilation album by Various artists
- Released: 1996
- Genre: Electro-industrial
- Length: 73:17
- Label: Re-Constriction

Re-Constriction Records V/A chronology
Thugs 'n' Kisses (1995)	Re-Constriction 10* Year Anniversary (1996)	Operation Beatbox (1996)

Re-Constriction 10* Year Anniversary is a various artists compilation album released in 1996 by Re-Constriction Records. Sonic Boom commended the collection and claimed "once again the perverse humor of the resident label slumlord has made its way into his product."

== Track listing ==
No.	Title	Writer(s)	Artist	Length
1.	"The Dreams That Rot in Your Heart"	Marc LaCorte, Eric Powell	16volt	3:39
2.	"Tear It All Away"	James Basore, John Belew, Marc Phillips, Karl Tellefsen, Christian Void	Killing Floor	4:07
3.	"Spider's Bride"	Roger Fracé, Daniel Neet	The Clay People	4:37
4.	"Optima" (Long Rough Mix)	Wade Alin, Rey Guajardo, Markus Von Prause	Christ Analogue	5:01
5.	"Violet's Dance"	kaRIN, Statik	Collide	2:38
6.	"The Son" (Rough Mix)	Marc Jameson, Kevin Marburg, Pat Toves	Diatribe	3:52
7.	"Murderous" (Nitzer Ebb cover)	Bon Harris, Douglas McCarthy	Iron Lung Corp	4:04
8.	"1000 Pieces"	Daemon Cadman, Martin Myers, Greg Price	Waiting for God	3:53
9.	"Awaken" (Hate Dept. Mix)	Dave Creadeau, Boom chr Paige	Society Burning	3:35
10.	"Blown Livid"	Jeff Hillard, Jason Whitcomb	Non-Aggression Pact	4:21
11.	"Whatever"	Nick Frederick, Matt McCord, Rey Osburn, Eric Stenman	Tinfed	4:14
12.	"Womb" (Coathanger Mix)	Blake Barnes, David York, Scott Morgan	Apparatus	4:59
13.	"Pure Uncut Anger"	Jason Bazinet, Sean Ivy	SMP	5:14
14.	"Saturation"	Steven Seibold, Daniel Vahnke	Vampire Rodents	2:50
15.	"Perfectly Fake"	Eric Powell, Jeff Taylor, Von Vinhasa	16volt	4:12
16.	"Never Go Right"	James Basore, John Belew, Marc Phillips, Christian Void	Killing Floor	5:05
17.	"Dead Man"	Dave Creadeau, Boom chr Paige	Society Burning	4:33
18.	"Untitled"	Rush Limbaugh	Rush Limbaugh	2:06
19.	"All Hail the King of Hate"	Steven Seibold	Steven Seibold	0:17

== Personnel ==
Adapted from the Re-Constriction 10* Year Anniversary liner notes.

- Steven Seibold – mastering

== Release history ==
Region	Date	Label	Format	Catalog
United States	1996	Re-Constriction	CD	REC-400
