= Got Moose? Re-Constriction CD Sampler 2 =

Got Moose? Re-Constriction CD Sampler #2

Compilation album by Various artists
- Released: 1997
- Genre: Electro-industrial
- Length: 71:16
- Label: Re-Constriction

Re-Constriction Records V/A chronology
TV Terror (1997)	Got Moose? Re-Constriction CD Sampler #2 (1997)	Cyberpunk Fiction (1998)

Got Moose? Re-Constriction CD Sampler #2 is a various artists compilation album released in 1997 by Re-Constriction Records. The album's title was inspired by Re-Constriction Records photographer Moose. Sonic Boom gave the album a mixed review, calling it an excellent prelude to later label material but noted the contributions of Purr Machine, Hot Box and Sissy Bar as being detractors.

== Track listing ==
No.	Title	Writer(s)	Artist	Length
1.	"Ultracide"	Phil Biagini, Marc Jameson, Kevin Marburg, Pat Toves	Diatribe	4:26
2.	"Cold Magnetic Sun" (Collide Remix)	Wade Alin, Rey Guajardo, Markus Von Prause	Christ Analogue	4:32
3.	"Twelve.Ten.Forty-Eight"	James Basore, John Belew, Marc Phillips, Karl Tellefsen, Christian Void	Killing Floor	3:59
4.	"Son of a Preacher Man" (Raw Mix)	John Hurley, Ronnie Wilkins	Collide	4:44
5.	"Turn"	Katie Helsby, Ian Palmer, Jonathan Sharp	Hexedene	4:53
6.	"Positive I.D."	Daemon Cadman, Martin Myers, Greg Price	Waiting for God	3:43
7.	"Gun Lover"	Ethan Novak, Gregory A. Lopez, Jason Novak	Acumen	3:56
8.	"Wake" (The Mission cover)	Mick Brown, Craig Adams, Simon Hinkler, Wayne Hussey	Hotbox	4:47
9.	"A Strange Day"	Daniel Neet	The Clay People	5:55
10.	"The Cut Collector"	Eric Powell	16volt	3:53
11.	"Tactiq"	Dave Creadeau, Boom chr Paige	Society Burning	6:17
12.	"Chemikaze" (DJ Twitch Remix)	Jason Novak	Iron Lung Corp	5:02
13.	"Mother Tongue"	Eric Powell, Daniel Vahnke	Vampire Rodents	3:10
14.	"Friday the 13th"	Jason Bazinet, Sean Ivy	SMP	3:24
15.	"Disjointed"	Nick Frederick, Matt McCord, Rey Osburn, Eric Stenman	Tinfed	4:32
16.	"Gin & Juice"	Snoop Dogg	Sissy Bar	4:03

== Personnel ==
Adapted from the Got Moose? Re-Constriction CD Sampler #2 liner notes.

- Chase – executive-producer

== Release history ==
Region	Date	Label	Format	Catalog
United States	1997	Re-Constriction	CD	REC-037
