= Ultracide =

Single by Diatribe
- B-side: "Junkyard"
- Released: 1996
- Studio: Various: Noiseplus; (Los Angeles, California); The Sonic Skateboards Studio
- Genre: Industrial rock
- Length: 4:26
- Label: Re-Constriction
- Songwriter(s): Phil Biagini; Marc Jameson; Kevin Marburg; Pat Toves

Ultracide is a song by Diatribe, released as a single in 1996 by Re-Constriction Records.

== Music ==
The songs "Ultracide" and "Advanced Therapy" were previously unreleased before appearing on the Ultracide single while the original version of "Junkyard" was taken from the band's self-titled debut. In 1997 "Ultracide" was placed on Got Moose? Re-Constriction CD Sampler #2 by Re-Constriction Records while "Junkyard" (Radio Edit) was released on Awake the Machines - On the Line Vol. 2 by Out of Line and Sub/Mission Records.

== Reception ==
Fabryka Music Magazine gave Ultracide three out of four possible stars and said ""Advanced Therapy" reminds me a bit of MLWTTKK, and "Ultracide" is a typical for Diatribe song with a variety of samples and stable atmosphere." Randolph Heard of Option recommended the release to those who enjoyed their 1996 debut album

== Track listing ==
No.	Title	Lyrics	Music	Remixer(s)	Length
1.	"Ultracide"	Marc Jameson	Phil Biagini; Marc Jameson; Kevin Marburg; Pat Toves		4:26
2.	"Junkyard" (Radio Edit)	Jameson	Biagini; Jameson		4:16
3.	"Junkyard" (Club Mix)	Jameson	Biagini; Jameson	Collide	5:24
4.	"Junkyard" (Two-Color Mix)	Jameson	Biagini; Jameson	Diatribe	5:59
5.	"Advanced Therapy"				7:38

== Personnel ==
Adapted from the Ultracide liner notes.

Diatribe

- Phil Biagini – electric guitar
- Marc Jameson – lead vocals, keyboards, drums, programming, production, engineering
- Kevin Marburg – bass guitar, sampler, cover art, design
- Pat Toves – electric guitar

Additional performers

- Eric Anest (as Statik) – editing and remixer (3)

== Release history ==
Region	Date	Label	Format	Catalog
United States	1996	Re-Constriction	CD	REC-007
United States	1996	Cargo	CD	REC-007
