= Rivethead =

Subculture of industrial dance music

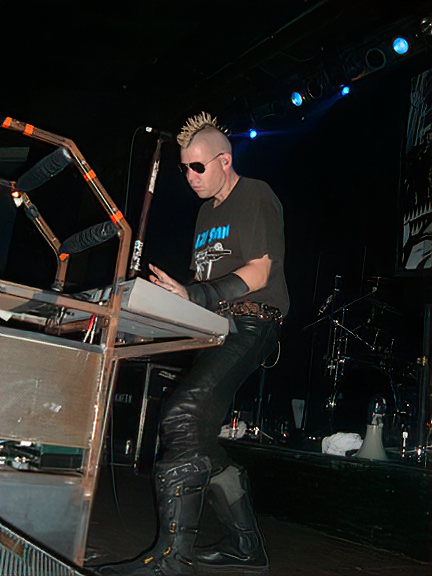
Sascha Konietzko, one of the most influential persons in the rivethead music scene since the 1990s, both musically and visually

A rivethead or rivet head is a person associated with the industrial dance music scene. In stark contrast to the original industrial culture, whose performers and heterogeneous audience were sometimes referred to as "industrialists", the rivethead scene is a coherent youth culture closely linked to a discernible fashion style. The scene emerged in the late 1980s on the basis of electro-industrial, EBM, and industrial rock music. The associated dress style draws on military fashion and punk aesthetics with hints of fetish wear, mainly inspired by the scene's musical protagonists.

== Origins of the term ==
Initially, the term rivethead had been used since the 1940s as a nickname for North American automotive assembly line and steel construction workers; the term hit the mainstream through the publication of Ben Hamper's Rivethead: Tales From the Assembly Line, which is otherwise unrelated to the subculture.

Chase, founder of San Diego label Re-Constriction Records, is responsible for the term's meaning in the 1990s. In 1993, he released Rivet Head Culture, a compilation that contains several electro-industrial and industrial rock acts from the American underground music scene. In the same year, industrial rock group Chemlab − whose members were close friends of Chase − had released their debut album Burn Out at the Hydrogen Bar, which includes a track called "Rivet Head". Chemlab singer Jared Louche said he did not remember where the term came from, although he stated that this song title was in his mind for years.

== Music ==
The rivethead scene is remotely related but not directly connected to the industrial music culture. Industrial music is a genre of experimental and avant garde music, intertwined with graphical visualization (mostly with disturbing graphical content). The absence of conventional song structures, such as rhythm and melody, is a main characteristic of the genre, whereas the music preferred by the rivethead scene includes several danceable and song-oriented styles that are sometimes considered "post-industrial". Like post-punk, the term post-industrial describes a musical genre that developed distinctly from its roots and turned into several strands of sound, namely electro-industrial, electronic body music, and industrial rock, often referred to as industrial dance music. Those styles differ from traditional industrial music regarding aesthetics, sound, and production techniques.

== Aesthetics ==
The rivethead dress style has been inspired by military aesthetics, complemented by fashion "that mimics the grit and grime of industrial sectors in major metropolitan areas". Additionally, it borrows elements of punk fashion, such as a fanned and dyed Mohawk hairstyle, and fetish wear such as black leather and PVC tops, pants and shorts partly supplemented with modern primitive body modifications such as tattoos and piercings.

Occasionally, rivetheads emphasize a post-apocalyptic, dystopian influence, often inspired by movies, e.g. Mad Max (1979), Escape from New York (1981), Gunhed (1989), Death Machine (1994), and Strange Days (1995). Several movies, such as Hardware (1990), Strange Days and Johnny Mnemonic (1995), feature music tracks by Ministry, KMFDM, Diatribe, Stabbing Westward and other bands associated with the rivethead culture. Other influences include sci-fi archetypes such as Lupus Yonderboy and Razorgirl, characters from the Sprawl trilogy by William Gibson.

Below are some basic characteristics of the rivethead dress style. As a divergence from the extravagance of youth cultures such as New Romantic, goth, cyber, and steampunk, the idea is to make a statement with as few fashion components as possible. The rivethead look commonly is unadorned and epitomizes a direct reflection of the social environment ("street survival wear").

=== Male ===
- Tops: Black, gray or olive tank tops, plain t-shirts, band shirts, sleeveless shirts (sometimes with the sleeves ripped off), tie-dye crinkle or burst pattern shirts; black leather jackets (frequently painted with band logos), and MA-1 flight jackets.
- Pants: Cargo and BDU paratrooper pants, ripped jeans, vintage shorts, often but not always black or Woodland camouflage; usually tucked into boots, rolled at the bottom cuffs or worn as cut-off shorts. Black leather pants and bondage pants are sometimes worn.
- Footwear: Combat boots, steel-toe boots or low shoes, such as Dr. Martens, Gripfasts, Grinders and Underground shoes.
- Hair: Partially shaved (undercut), flattop, Mohawk or completely shaved. Sometimes long hair in combination with undercut or dreadlocks.
- Accessories: Teashades and Ray-Ban Aviator sunglasses. Battle Dress Uniform-style or military belts; bracelets and dog tags; fingerless leather gloves; sometimes jewelry that incorporates industrial elements such as nails, screws and cogs. Suspenders, or "braces", normally worn hanging off trousers or shorts.
- Body modification: Primarily piercings and tattoos.

=== Female ===
Rivetgirls may dress along with the femme fatale look: sexuality as power. Common are fetish wear, such as black PVC and leather corsages, miniskirts, ankle-deep or knee-high stiletto heel boots; less makeup than Goths and 1980s New Wave fashion girls, who were also an influence on the late-1980s/early 1990s rivetgirl style (cf. fishnet tights, stilettos, Dr. Martens low boots). Often dyed hair (black, sometimes red or blond) that is long, short, spiked, partially shaved (see Maria Azevedo of Battery and Yone Dudas of Decoded Feedback) or dreadlocked (see Anna Christine of Luxt). On the other hand, the female rivethead fashion look may be and often is identical to the tough style of the male rivetheads (Tank Girl aesthetic; military wear such as tank tops, paratrooper pants and combat boots). Kim X, co-founder of California-based music label COP International, compared the female rivethead attitude to the Riot grrrl movement.

Women involved in the 'Industrial scene' wore less makeup, particularly less elaborate eye makeup. They also adopted a much more traditional Punk look, with shorter skirts, made of leather or vinyl, and combat boots. Because of the athletics required of 'Industrial' dancing, it was rare to see women in this scene with spike heels, as it would constrain their movement on the dance floor. The male 'Industrial style' also was much closer to Punk, with men wearing shorts, big boots and adopting partially shaved hairstyles.

— Kristen Schilt, sociologist at the University of Chicago

== Comparison with goth subculture ==
The rivethead scene of the 1980s and 1990s was different from the goth subculture in ideological and musical terms, as well as in their visual aesthetics. Confusion regarding the boundaries of those two youth cultures has heightened because of the late-1990s "multi-subcultural" cross-hybridization, which led people to incorrectly believe that rivetheads are an offshoot of the goth subculture. Canadian novelist and author Nancy Kilpatrick labelled this youth-cultural overlap "industrial goth", as does Julia Borden. ( − Note: In the heyday of the rivethead culture, the term "industrial goth" as a description of a youth culture did not exist).

"The 'Industrial look' began to emerge in the late 1980s. […] The typical 'Industrial' guy, circa 1989, was a Punk who liked technology."

— Julia Borden

"In contrast to the old-style Goth look, which was androgynous, the male 'Industrial look' was tough and military, with a sci-fi edge. The men wore […] band T-shirts, black trousers or military cargo pants in black, military accessories, such as dog-tags, heavy boots […] 'Industrial' women, who were fewer in number, tended to wear waist-cinching corsets, small tank tops or 'wife-beaters' [sleeveless t-shirts], trousers, and sometimes suspenders hanging down off the pants. They also […] sometimes shaved their heads."

— Valerie Steele, fashion historian and director of MFIT, New York.

"Stylistically, both men and women in the Gothic subculture […] rely heavily on feminine signifiers, such as makeup, skirts and corsets, while the 'Industrial scene' adopts a much more masculine style that incorporates more traditional Punk elements, such as combat boots and leather pants. […] Unlike their Gothic counterparts, the male 'Industrials' did not wear makeup."

— Kristen Schilt, sociologist at the University of Chicago

Goths are a dark romantic outgrowth of the punk and post-punk movements that emerged in the early 1980s while rivetheads developed from the industrial dance music scene that came to be in the second half of the 1980s, hand in hand with the media success of post-industrial artists such as Skinny Puppy, Front 242, Front Line Assembly, Ministry, KMFDM, and Numb. The rivethead scene is a male-dominated youth subculture that shows a provocative, insurgent as well as socio-critical approach. The Goth subculture is "equally open to women, men and transgendered [sic] people", and frequently devoid of any interest in ethical activism or political involvements.

"Gothic expresses the emotional, beautiful, supernatural, feminine, poetic, theatrical side. Industrial embodies the masculine, angry, aggressive, noisy, scientific, technological, political side. Industrial music often uses electronics, synthesizers, samples from movies or political speeches, loops, and distorted vocals. It tends to be male-oriented in those who make the music and those who enjoy it."

== See also ==
- Cyberpunk
- Electronic body music
- Industrial music
- List of industrial music festivals
