= Nothing (Diatribe EP) =

EP by Diatribe
- Released: October 19, 1992
- Recorded: 1992
- Studio: Various: Razor's Edge Recording; (San Francisco, CA)); Suburban Blood Shed; (San Jose, CA)
- Genre: Industrial rock
- Length: 18:06
- Label: Re-Constriction
- Producers: Marc Jameson; Kevin Marburg; Vince Montalbano; Nivek Ogre; Lee Popa; Pat Toves

Diatribe chronology
| Therapy (1991) | Nothing (1992) | Diatribe (1996) |

Nothing is the second EP by Diatribe, released on October 19, 1992, by Re-Constriction Records.

== Music ==
Recording for Nothing began after the band released Therapy in 1991 for Eight One Nine Productions and COP International. When asked about how Lee Popa and Nivek Ogre become involved with the production of Nothing, Kevin Marburg stated:

It was just through this weird connections of friends who hang out with some weird people in Chicago. One of my friends, who is a skateboarder went on a Ministry tour and met Lee. He happened to bring along a tape of Diatribe material and he played it for Lee. Lee liked our music a lot and he came out to California to help us out because he felt that we had some potential. He also brought Ogre along to help out whom he had met during the Ministry tour as well. We've been friends with both of them ever since.

The band released several songs from the EP to various artists compilations for promotion. Remixed versions of "The Other Side" and "Kingpin" were released on the 1992 Assimilation compilation album by Metal Blade Records. Another remix of "Kingpin" titled "Exclusive Mix" was later released on the compilations Funky Alternatives Seven in 1993 and again a year later on Alternative Route '94. "The Other Side" was released on the Chambermade compilation by Re-Constriction Records in 1995 and later re-recorded for band's 1996 eponymously titled debut studio album Diatribe. Between the release of Nothing and the band's debut album they recorded a cover of Sugarcubes' "Coldsweat" for Shut Up Kitty: A Cyber-Based Covers Compilation by Re-Constriction Records, which was released in 1993.

== Reception ==
Fabryka Music Magazine gave the album three out of four possible stars and recommended the album for enthusiasts of early 90's industrial rock. Sonic Boom gave both Diatribe's debut release and Nothing a positive review, saying "Diatribe has at least as much talent as the rest of their label mates."

== Track listing ==
All tracks are written by Marc Jameson, Kevin Marburg, Vince Montalbano and Pat Toves.

| No. | Title | Length |
|---|---|---|
| 1. | "Nothing" | 4:38 |
| 2. | "The Other Side" | 5:25 |
| 3. | "Kingpin" | 5:59 |
| 4. | "Lu-Chow Phang" | 2:04 |

== Personnel ==
Adapted from the Nothing liner notes.

Diatribe

- Marc Jameson – lead vocals, keyboards, drums, programming, production (1–3), engineering (1–3), mixing (1, 3), recording (4)
- Kevin Marburg – bass guitar, sampler, cover art, design, production (1, 3), engineering (1, 3), mixing (1, 3)
- Vince Montalbano – electric guitar, production (1, 3), engineering (1, 3), mixing (1, 3)
- Pat Toves – electric guitar, production (1, 3), engineering (1, 3), mixing (1, 3)

Production and additional personnel

- Jonathan Burnside – editing, engineering
- Ken Lee – mastering
- Nivek Ogre – production (1, 3), engineering (1, 3), mixing (1, 3)
- Lee Popa – production (1, 3), engineering (1, 3), mixing (1, 3)
- Jeff Stuart Saltzman – mixing (2)

== Release history ==
| Region | Date | Label | Format | Catalog |
|---|---|---|---|---|
| United States | 1992 | Re-Constriction | CD | REC-001 |
