= Operation Beatbox =

Compilation album by Various artists
- Released: September 17, 1996
- Genre: Industrial rock, electro-industrial
- Length: 74:01
- Label: Re-Constriction

Re-Constriction Records V/A chronology
Re-Constriction 10* Year Anniversary (1996)	Operation Beatbox (1996)	Built for Stomping (1997)

Professional ratings
Review scores
Source	Rating
Allmusic	2/5 stars
Alternative Press	5/5 stars

Operation Beatbox is a various artists compilation album released on September 17, 1996 by Re-Constriction Records. The album compiles covers of popular hip hop tracks performed by electro-industrial acts, many of whom were part of the Re-Constriction roster. It served as a direct sequel to the similarly themed cover album compilation Shut Up Kitty, released in 1993.

== Reception ==
Alternative Press gave the album high praises, awarding it five out of five stars and saying "there's no doubt that when it comes to rewriting rap's classic moments, industrial/goth bands say more for the cultural links between the two black sheep of modern musical culture than one might have dreamed." Aiding & Abetting gave it a more mixed review, saying the material ranges "from the sublime (SMP thrashing out "Prophets of Rage") to the utterly silly (as any cover of "Gangsta's Paradise" was bound to be)." Sonic Boom found the compilation's absurdity to be part of its charm, saying "don't be surprised if you find the majority of these tracks more than amusing as there is something fundamentally wrong with a gang of privileged white kids trying to sound like a band of inner city black youths."

== Track listing ==
No.	Title	Writer(s)	Artist	Length
1.	"Natural Born Killaz" (Dr. Dre & Ice Cube cover)	James Anderson, O'Shea Jackson, Andre Young	Christ Analogue	4:09
2.	"I Ain't Goin' Out Like That" (Cypress Hill cover)	Louis Freese, Lawrence Muggerud, Richard Todd Ray	16Volt	4:15
3.	"Jump Around" (House of Pain cover)	Everlast	The Clay People	3:34
4.	"Colors" (Ice-T cover)	Ice-T, Afrika Islam	Society Burning	4:56
5.	"Night of the Living Baseheads" (Public Enemy cover)	Carlton "Chuck D" Ridenhour, Eric "Vietnam" Sadler, Hank Shocklee	Terminal 46	4:11
6.	"The Devil Made Me Do It" (Paris cover)	Oscar Jackson, Jr.	Apparatus	4:00
7.	"Gangsta's Paradise" (Coolio & L.V. cover)	Stevie Wonder, Coolio, Doug Rasheed, Larry Sanders	Battery	4:52
8.	"Push It" (Salt-n-Pepa cover)	Hurby Azor, Ray Davies	Numb	4:40
9.	"Fight the Power" (Public Enemy cover)	Hank Boxley, Keith Boxley, Carlton Ridenhour, Eric Sadler	D.C.K.	4:20
10.	"Looking Down the Barrel of a Gun" (Beastie Boys cover)	Mike Diamond, Adam Horovitz, John King, Michael Simpson, Adam Yauch	Tinfed & Killing Floor	3:55
11.	"Prophets of Rage" (Public Enemy cover)	William Drayton, Carlton Ridenhour, Eric Sadler, Hank Shocklee	SMP	3:21
12.	"Wicked" (Ice Cube cover)	O'Shea Jackson	Colla Destra	4:47
13.	"Typical American" (The Goats cover)	James D'Angelo, Swayzack, Maxx Stoyanoff-Williams	Slave Unit	3:14
14.	"King of Rock" (Run–D.M.C. cover)	Darryl McDaniels, Jay Mizel, Joseph Simmons, Larry Smith, Russell Simmons	Institute of Technology	4:56
15.	"Mama Said Knock You Out" (LL Cool J cover)	James Todd Smith	Apolitiq	5:17
16.	"Can You Rock It Like This" (Run–D.M.C. cover)	J.T. Smith, Larry Smith, Rick Rubin	Insight 23	4:37
17.	"Two Three Break" (Beastie Boys cover)	Mike Diamond, Adam Horovitz, Rick Rubin, Adam Yauch	Abstinence	4:57

== Accolades ==
Year	Publication	Country	Accolade	Rank
1995	CMJ New Music Monthly	United States	"Dance"	17
"*" denotes an unordered list.

== Personnel ==
Adapted from the Operation Beatbox liner notes.

- Chase – compiling
- Scan, Boy! – cover art
- Steven Seibold – mastering

== Release history ==
Region	Date	Label	Format	Catalog
United States	1996	Re-Constriction	CD, CS	REC-023
