= Diatribe (disambiguation) =

A diatribe is a kind of oration made in criticism of someone or something.

Diatribe or Diatribes may also refer to:

== Books and publications ==
- "Diatribe" (newspaper column), a weekly newspaper column by Dean Kalimniou
- Discourses of Epictetus or Diatribes, texts circulated by Arrian circa 108
- Diatribes, a work by Bion of Borysthenes
- Diatribes, texts by Teles of Megara written circa 235 BC

== Music ==
- Diatribe (band), an industrial rock group
  - Diatribe (album), a 1996 album by Diatribe
- Diatribes (album), a 1996 album by Napalm Death
