= Cyberpunk Fiction: A Synthcore "Soundtrack" =

1998 compilation album by various artists

Cyberpunk Fiction - A Synthcore "Soundtrack"

Compilation album by Various artists
- Released: November 17, 1998
- Genres: Industrial rock, electro-industrial
- Length: 67:10
- Label: Re-Constriction

Re-Constriction Records V/A chronology
Got Moose? (1997)	Cyberpunk Fiction - A Synthcore "Soundtrack" (1998)	Songs From the Wasteland (1998)

Professional ratings
Review scores
Source	Rating
Allmusic	2/5 stars

Cyberpunk Fiction: A Synthcore "Soundtrack" is a various artists compilation album released on November 17, 1998 by Re-Constriction Records.

== Reception ==
Aiding & Abetting gave it mixed review, praising the execution while saying "the spoken parts sound a little hokey" and the "music sounds like rote walkthroughs." Sonic Boom called the album a parody masterpiece and "not only are most of the cover interpretations by Synthcore and Electro bands dazzling but the re-written dialogue is the funniest thing I have heard in years." Chris Best of Lollipop Magazine praised the "concoction of heavy beats and eerily juxtaposed melodies", saying "the fit is strange and awkward, but the accidental result is that each group transforms their sound from typical dance floor industrial into a totally new beast."

== Track listing ==
No.	Title	Writer(s)	Artist	Length
1.	"Misirlou Twist" (Dick Dale and His Del-Tones cover)	Milton Leeds, Joseph C. Pina, Nicholas Roubanis, Chaim Tauber, Fred Wise	Tinfed	3:45
2.	"Electro Body Music"		Dave Creadeau & Roman Greene	1:26
3.	"Jungle Boogie" (Kool & the Gang cover)	Clifford Adams, Robert Earl Bell, Ronald Nathan Bell, Donald Boyce, George Melvin Brown, Robert Spike Mickens, Claydes Charles Smith, Dennis Thomas	Killing Floor & Arjan McNamara	3:49
4.	"Let's Stay Together" (Al Green cover)	Al Green, Al Jackson Jr., Kieran Lenssen, Willie Mitchell	Christ Analogue	3:42
5.	"Bustin' Surfboards" (The Tornadoes cover)	Leonard Delaney, Gerald Sanders, Jesse Sanders, Norman Sanders	Society Burning	3:46
6.	"Son of a Preacher Man" (Dusty Springfield cover)	John Hurley, Ronnie Wilkins	Collide	4:42
7.	"Bullwinkle Part II" (The Centurians cover)	Ernie Furrow, Dennis Rose	Society Burning	4:52
8.	"Mos Eisley Download Contest"		Dave Creadeau & Kari Beth Hodson	0:31
9.	"You Never Can Tell" (Chuck Berry cover)	Chuck Berry	Hotbox	3:01
10.	"Lonesome Town" (Ricky Nelson cover)	Baker Knight	Nimpf	3:32
11.	"Girl, You'll Be a Woman Soon" (Neil Diamond cover)	Neil Diamond	Purr Machine	4:29
12.	"If Love Is a Red Dress (Hang Me in Rags)" (Maria McKee cover)	Maria McKee	Society Burning	4:44
13.	"Bring Out the Hack/Comanche" (The Revels cover)	Robert John Hafner	Society Burning	2:56
14.	"Flowers on the Wall" (The Statler Brothers cover)		Non-Aggression Pact	5:09
15.	"User Friendliness Goes a Long Way"		Roman Greene	1:01
16.	"Surf Rider" (The Ventures cover)	Bob Bogle, Nokie Edwards, Don Wilson	Society Burning	2:57
17.	"FAQ 25.17"		Roman Greene	0:48
18.	"Girl, You'll Be a Woman Soon" (Neil Diamond cover)	Neil Diamond	16volt	4:38
19.	"You Never Can Tell" (Chuck Berry cover)	Chuck Berry	Hexedene & Jude Graham	4:31
20.	"Flowers on the Wall" (The Statler Brothers cover)	Lew DeWitt	Society Burning	3:22

== Accolades ==
Year	Publication	Country	Accolade	Rank
1995	CMJ New Music Monthly	United States	"RPM"	9
"*" denotes an unordered list.

== Personnel ==
Adapted from the CyberPunk Fiction - A Synthcore "Soundtrack" liner notes.

Production and design

- Chase – compiling
- Scott Gorham – mastering
- Kevin Marburg – cover art
- Josquin des Pres – mastering

Additional musicians

- Kait Ellen Cottengim – voice (1)
- Kyle Cottengim – voice (1)
- Dave Creadeau – voice (2, 8, 15)
- DJ Twitch – voice (7)
- Kari Beth Hodson – voice (8)
- Satan Ferrell – voice (13)
- Roman Greene – voice (2, 15, 17)
- John "Ur-Grue" Holder – voice (13)

== Release history ==
Region	Date	Label	Format	Catalog
United States	1998	Re-Constriction	CD	REC-031
