= Waiting for God =

Waiting for God may refer to:

- Waiting for God (1950 book), by Simone Weil
- Waiting for God (TV series), a British TV sitcom, 1990–1994
- Waiting for God (band), a Canadian goth-industrial band
  - Waiting for God (album), 1994
- "Waiting for God" (Red Dwarf), a 1988 episode of the TV series
- "Waiting for God", a song by Paradise Lost, from the album Believe in Nothing

== See also ==
- Waiting for Godot, a 1949 play by Samuel Beckett
