= Chambermade =

Compilation album by Various artists
- Released: 1995
- Genre: Electro-industrial
- Label: Cargo Music/Re-Constriction

Re-Constriction Records V/A chronology
Frostbyte (1995)	Chambermade (1995)	Thugs 'n' Kisses (1995)

Chambermade is a various artists compilation album released in 1995 by Cargo Music and Re-Constriction Records.

== Reception ==
Larry Dean Miles of Black Monday gave Chambermade a positive review and pointed to "the intense simplicity of Clay People's powerful guitar oriented crunch, the ever charming 16 Volt, and Non-Aggression Pact's thumping, enduring pulse." Sonic Boom mostly praised the album but noted Non-Aggression Pact's contribution as being a detractor.

== Track listing ==
Side one
No.	Title	Writer(s)	Artist	Length
1.	"Awaken" (Hate Mix)	Dave Creadeau, Boom chr Paige	Society Burning
2.	"Pariah"	Daniel Neet	The Clay People
3.	"Wrench" (Gizmo Edit)	Blake Barnes, Scott Morgan, David York	Apparatus
4.	"Never Go Right"	James Basore, John Belew, Marc Phillips, Christian Void	Killing Floor
5.	"Violet's Dance"	Eric Anest, kaRIN	Collide

Side two
No.	Title	Writer(s)	Artist	Length
1.	"Perfectly Fake"	Eric Powell, Jeff Taylor, Von Vinhasa	16volt
2.	"Thin Wall Turmoil"	Nick Frederick, Matt McCord, Rey Osburn, Eric Stenman	Tinfed
3.	"Blown Livid"	Jeff Hillard, Jason Whitcomb	Non-Aggression Pact
4.	"Mother Tongue"	Eric Powell, Daniel Vahnke	Vampire Rodents
5.	"Pure Uncut Anger"	Jason Bazinet, Sean Setterberg	SMP

== Personnel ==
Adapted from the Chambermade liner notes.

- Chase – compiling

== Release history ==
Region	Date	Label	Format	Catalog
United States	1995	Cargo Music, Re-Constriction	CS	REC-300
