= Songs from the Wasteland (A Tribute to the Mission) =

Compilation album of cover songs by Various artists
- Released: February 17, 1998
- Genre: Industrial rock, electro-industrial
- Length: 73:57
- Label: Re-Constriction

Re-Constriction Records V/A chronology
Cyberpunk Fiction (1998)	Songs from the Wasteland (A Tribute to the Mission) (1998)	Nod's Tacklebox o' Fun (1999)

Songs from the Wasteland (A Tribute to the Mission) is a various artists compilation album released on February 17, 1998 by Re-Constriction Records. The album features industrial rock acts performing cover songs originally written by gothic rock band Mission UK. The idea originated from Tony Lestat, who approached Re-Constriction Records manager Chase to release the album.

== Reception ==
Professional ratings
Review scores
Source	Rating
AllMusic	2.5/5 stars

Heather Phares of AllMusic said Songs from the Wasteland is arguably "fans of either the Mission UK or the bands paying tribute may find Songs From The Wasteland worthwhile." Aiding & Abetting gave the album a somewhat negative review, saying "unfortunately, most of the bands on this set (the ones picked by Tony Lestat, the main compilator) are fairly generic gothic (excuse me, darkwave) runthroughs" and "some of the more gothic versions sound nice enough, but they don't have anything new to say." Sonic Boom shared their critique and called the release "rather shallow and vapid" and "if it wasn't for the four Synthcore artists on this collection of The Mission covers by Gothic acts, this mediocre and monotonous release would fall flat on its face."

== Track listing ==
All tracks are written by Craig Adams, Michael Brown, Simon Hinkler and Wayne Hussey

No.	Title	Artist	Length
1.	"Naked & Savage"	Society Burning	4:14
2.	"Deliverance"	The Last Dance	5:37
3.	"Garden of Delight"	Christ Analogue	4:18
4.	"Tower of Strength"	Wreckage	5:58
5.	"Wake (R.S.V.)"	Hotbox	4:45
6.	"Spider and the Fly"	Stone 588	4:38
7.	"Serpents Kiss"	Tungsten Coil	4:16
8.	"Wasteland"	Fahrenheit 451	5:25
9.	"Severina"	The Shroud	4:09
10.	"Butterfly on a Wheel"	Purr Machine	5:01
11.	"The Grapes of Wrath"	Cruciform	4:59
12.	"Raising Cain"	Desmo Donte	4:26
13.	"Blood Brother"	Ex-Voto	5:22
14.	"Kingdom Come"	Human Drama	4:52
15.	"Love Me to Death"	Eva O & Stun Gun	5:57

== Personnel ==
Adapted from the Songs from the Wasteland (A Tribute to the Mission) liner notes.

- Kaja Blackley – cover art
- Chase – compiling, design
- Trevor Henthorn – mastering
- Tony Lestat – compiling
- Jeff Motch – design

== Release history ==
Region	Date	Label	Format	Catalog
United States	1998	Re-Constriction	CD	REC-041
