= Nod's Tacklebox o' Fun =

Compilation album by Various artists
- Released: 1999
- Genre: Industrial rock, electro-industrial
- Length: 70:32
- Label: Re-Constriction

Re-Constriction Records V/A chronology
Songs From the Wasteland (1998)	Nod's Tacklebox o' Fun (1999)

Nod's Tacklebox o' Fun is a various artists compilation album released in 1999 by Re-Constriction Records.

== Reception ==
Aiding & Abetting gave it a mixed review, saying "the same incoherent mix of covers (everything from "MMMBop" to "Ice Ice Baby" to "The Devil Went Down to Georgia" to "Diamonds are Forever"), the same sorts of bands. The same mixed results." Chris Best of Lollipop Magazine agreed, saying "while not great, the concept is fun and so are the covers." Ink 19 claimed that "this disc isn’t something that you'll listen to that much farther down the road, but for now, it’s certain to leave you in hysterics."

== Track listing ==
No.	Title	Writer(s)	Artist	Length
1.	"Lovefool" (The Cardigans cover)	Nina Persson, Peter Svensson	Society Burning	4:34
2.	"MMMBop" (Hanson cover)	Isaac Hanson, Taylor Hanson, Zac Hanson	Purr Machine	3:45
3.	"You Spin Me Round" (Dead or Alive cover)	Pete Burns, Steve Coy, Wayne Hussey, Tim Lever, Mike Percy	Hate Dept.	4:18
4.	"Policy of Truth" (Depeche Mode cover)	Martin Gore	Tinfed	4:31
5.	"Don't You Want Me" (The Human League cover)	Jo Callis, Philip Oakey, Philip Adrian Wright	db9d9	4:00
6.	"Just a Girl" (No Doubt cover)	Tom Dumont, Gwen Stefani	Hotbox	3:34
7.	"Waterfalls" (TLC cover)	Marqueze Etheridge, Lisa Lopes, Organized Noize	New Mind	4:51
8.	"When Doves Cry" (Prince cover)	Prince	Mindless Faith	3:30
9.	"Devil Went Down to Georgia" (Charlie Daniels Band cover)	Tom Crain, Charlie Daniels, "Taz" DiGregorio, Fred Edwards, Charles Hayward, James W Marshall	Vault Point 9	4:09
10.	"Revenge" (Ministry cover)	Al Jourgensen	Trust Obey	4:11
11.	"Ice Ice Baby" (Vanilla Ice cover)	Floyd Brown, Mario Johnson, Vanilla Ice	The WFG All-Stars	3:54
12.	"You Oughta Know" (Alanis Morissette cover)	Glen Ballard, Alanis Morissette	Alien Faktor	4:04
13.	"The Metro" (Berlin cover)	John Crawford	SMP	4:16
14.	"Safety Dance" (Men Without Hats cover)	Ivan Doroschuk	Pain Station	5:10
15.	"Diamonds Are Forever" (Shirley Bassey cover)	John Barry, Don Black	Hexedene	2:55
16.	"Animal Magnetism" (Scorpions cover)	Klaus Meine, Herman Rarebell, Rudolf Schenker	Oneiroid Psychosis	4:55
17.	"Sabotage" (Beastie Boys cover)	Michael Diamond, Adam Horovitz, Adam Yauch	Ordnance	3:53

== Personnel ==
Adapted from the Nod's Tacklebox o' Fun liner notes.

- Josquin des Pres – mastering
- Jay Stephens – cover art

== Release history ==
Region	Date	Label	Format	Catalog
United States	1999	Re-Constriction	CD	REC-035
