= Awake the Machines - On the Line Vol. 2 =

Compilation album by Various artists
- Released: 1997
- Genre: Electro-industrial
- Length: 72:56
- Label: Out of Line/Sub/Mission

Awake the Machines: On the Line Vol. 2 is a various artists compilation album released in 1997 by Out of Line and Sub/Mission Records. Sonic Boom called Awake the Machines: On the Line Vol. 2 "one of the most thorough collections of North American industrial artists available."

== Track listing ==
Disc one
No.	Title	Writer(s)	Artist	Length
1.	"Laurels"	Matt Green; Athan Maroulis	Spahn Ranch	4:53
2.	"Blinding"	Mick Hale; vMarkus	Crocodile Shop	4:43
3.	"Fascion" (Demo)	Chris Liggio	Bile	4:00
4.	"Self Destructive Path"	Rasco Agroyam; Erk Aicrag	Hocico	5:58
5.	"Burn the Bridge"	Robert Andrew Bowman; Adelheid "Heidi" Winkler	Randolph's Grin	4:01
6.	"Lessor of 2 Evils"	Dwayne Dassing; Gary Dassing; Richard Mendez	Benestrophe	5:18
7.	"Optima" (Organic-Clean Radio Edit)	Wade Alin; Rey Guajardo; Markus Von Prause	Christ Analogue	4:15
8.	"Electric Molecular" (KMFDM "Death Before Taxes" Mix)	Jared Louche; Dylan Thomas More; William Tucker	Chemlab	4:05
9.	"Junkyard" (Radio Edit)	Phil Biagini; Marc Jameson	Diatribe	4:15
10.	"This Is the Life"	Chad Bishop; David Ivy; Bruce King; Alan Premselaar	Idiot Stare	3:26
11.	"OnLine" (Moda Mix)	Davide Balbo; David Loop	L.I.N.	4:41
12.	"reInventing sLeep" (electroBodyedit)	Hale; George Sarah	proGREX.iv	3:35
13.	"Suffer the Flesh"	Shikhee D'iordna	Android Lust	5:07
14.	"Dark Room"	Ivan Iusco; Dirk Ivens	Dive	4:09
15.	"Awake the Machine"	Jeremy Daw; Lynda Sterling	Yeht Mae	3:49
16.	"Some Urban Myths"	Shawn Rudiman; Ed Vargo	THD	6:57

Disc two
No.	Title	Writer(s)	Artist	Length
1.	"Pleiadian Agenda"	Vas Kallas; Kaizer Von Loopy	Hanzel und Gretyl	3:40
2.	"Moses Gun" (D!V!S!ON #9 Flowmix)	John Bainbridge; Travis Earl; James Ray; Damon Vingoe	James Ray's Gangwar	4:22
3.	"Space Divider"	Vesa Rainne; Jarkko Tuohimaa	Neuroactive	3:50
4.	"3 Murders, 3 Nights"	Bryan Barton; Charles Levi; Jared Louche; Jordan Nogood; Eric Powell	H3llb3nt	4:13
5.	"Behind the Line" (Crocodile Shop Edit)	Bruno Van Garsse; Jacky Meurisse; Michel Nachtergaele	Signal Aout 42	3:01
6.	"Less Than Zero"	Boom Fernandez; Dave Mansfield	Society Burning	4:28
7.	"Crobar America"	Jamie Duffy; Alex Eller; Gregory A. Lopez; Brian McGarvey; Daniel Neet; Will Nivens; Ethan Novak; Jason Novak	Iron Lung Corp	4:06
8.	"Monuments of Flesh"	Carri; E.S.T.L.; Joni	Chaingun Operate	4:46
9.	"The Fall"	Roger Jarvis; Ryan Gribbin	Kevorkian Death Cycle	4:04
10.	"My Weakest Point"	Robert Bustamante	Fektion Fekler	3:30
11.	"People of the Land"	James Mendez; Mendez	Two Witches	5:11
12.	"Crisis de Identidad#1749"	Jose Luis Pellicer; Fernando Zambrana	Deus Ex Machina	4:08
13.	"Taste" (Salvation-Remixed By Birmingham 6)	Michael Antener	Hellsau	5:11
14.	"Kick th' Eye"	13-ate; theHand	Hand of God	3:29
15.	"Arena 85"	F.J. DeSanto; Michael Hess; Mark Mohtashemi; Tom Whitfleet	The Aggression	4:54
16.	"California Dreamin"	Brigit Brat	God's Girlfriend	4:26
17.	"Strange Day"	Brian McGarvey; Daniel Neet	Clay People	5:54

== Personnel ==
Adapted from the Awake the Machines - On the Line Vol. 2 liner notes.

Musicians

- Birmingham 6 – remixer (2.13)
- Paolo Favati – remixer (1.1)
- Mick Hale – remixer (2.2)
- Sascha Konietzko – remixer (1.8)
- Ricardo May – remixer (11.1)
- Chris Shepard – remixer (1.8)
- vMarkus – remixer (2.5)

Production and design

- John Bergin – cover art
- Dance Assembly Music Network (DAMn!) – design
- Alan Douches – mastering
- Mick Hale – mastering

== Release history ==
Region	Date	Label	Format	Catalog
Germany	1997	Out of Line/Sub/Mission	CD	OUT 017, WHIP 037
