= Liquid Sex Decay (album) =

1997 studio album by Liquid Sex Decay

Studio album by Liquid Sex Decay
- Released: December 1997
- Studio: Studio B (Charlotte, NC)
- Genre: Electro-industrial
- Length: 47:22
- Label: MJ-12

Liquid Sex Decay is the eponymously titled and only studio album by Liquid Sex Decay, released in December 1997 by MJ-12 Records.

== Reception ==
Aiding & Abetting called Liquid Sex Decay "better than average" and "the results are generally good, though sometimes the final sound seems oddly lightweight." A critic at Black Monday called the compositions intriguing and said "LSD is fresh, fun and exciting, including ambient, industrial and electronic elements in dark trip into gorgeously textured imagery." Sonic Boom praised the musicians of Apparatus and commended them for revealing their artistic growth and moving away from guitar dominated compositions. Steven Cannon of Vibrations of Doom praised the diverse instrumentation and unusual gothic atmosphere.

== Track listing ==
All tracks are written by Scott Morgan and David York.

No.	Title	Length
1.	"LSD"	5:34
2.	"Dr. Who?"	6:24
3.	"Everything Dies"	6:07
4.	"Pins and Needles"	6:44
5.	"Different Breed"	6:57
6.	"Schizophrenia"	6:06
7.	"Needles and Pins"	5:38
8.	"Pins and Needles" (Radio Edit)	3:52

== Personnel ==
Adapted from the Liquid Sex Decay liner notes.

Liquid Sex Decay

- Scott Morgan (as Sid) – guitar, engineering
- David York (as D. York) – keyboards, engineering

Production and design

- Dave Harris – mastering
- Mary Lawing – cover art

== Release history ==
Region	Date	Label	Format	Catalog
United States	1997	MJ-12	CD	MJ12-001
