= Starry =

Starry may refer to:

- Starry (drink), a beverage sold by PepsiCo
- Starry (The Killjoys album), 1994
- Starry (Purr Machine album), 2007
- Donn A. Starry (1925–2011), United States Army general
- Starry Lee (born 1974), Hong Kong politician
- Starry Internet, a Verizon fixed wireless internet service provider
- Starry (musical), a musical about van Gogh.

== See also ==
- Star (disambiguation)
