= Tantau =

Tantau may refer to:

- Rosen Tantau, a German flower breeding company
- "Tantau", a song by Diatribe from their EP Therapy
- Tantau Avenue in Cupertino, California, the street on which many offices of Apple Inc are located
