= Therapy (Diatribe EP) =

EP by Diatribe
- Released: 1991
- Recorded: 1990 – 1991
- Studios: Suburban Blood Shed (San Jose, CA)
- Genre: Industrial rock
- Length: 21:49
- Label: Eight One Nine
- Producer: Marc Jameson

Diatribe chronology
Therapy (1991)	Nothing (1992)

Therapy is the debut EP of Diatribe, released in 1991 by Eight One Nine Productions. It was reissued by COP International later that year.

== Music ==
Diatribe's Therapy EP was originally released in 1991 by Eight One Nine Productions. The music came to the attention of Christian Petke, vocalist and founding member of Deathline International, and he decided to use Diatribe and Battery as premier band's for his label COP International. "Cockeyed Motherfucker" was first released on the 1990 various artists compilations From the Machine by Index Productions and A Reason for Living by Santa Cruz Skateboards. The songs "Tantau" and "Needle Park" were released on COP Intl.'s California Cyber Crash Compilation and If It Moves...'s The Cyberflesh Conspiracy in 1992. The artwork for the release was accidentally switched with Meat Market by Diatribe when it was reissued on COP International in 1992.

== Track listing ==
All tracks are written by Marc Jameson, Kevin Marburg, Vince Montalbano and Pat Toves.

No.	Title	Length
1.	"Therapy"	4:29
2.	"Tantau"	5:43
3.	"Billy the Kid"	1:15

Side two
No.	Title	Length
1.	"Cockeyed Motherfucker"	5:13
2.	"Needle Park"	5:09

CD issue
No.	Title	Length
1.	"Therapy"	4:42
2.	"Tantau"	5:42
3.	"Maximum Therapy"	8:48
4.	"Meathook"	1:27

== Personnel ==
Adapted from the Therapy liner notes.

Diatribe

- Marc Jameson – lead vocals, keyboards, drums, programming, production, engineering
- Kevin Marburg – bass guitar, sampler, cover art, design
- Vince Montalbano – electric guitar
- Pat Toves – electric guitar

== Release history ==
Region	Date	Label	Format	Catalog
United States	1991	Eight One Nine	CS	eon 021
United States	1991	COP Intl.	CD	COP 003
United States	1992	COP Intl.	CD	COP 003
