= Liquid Sex Decay =

Electro-industrial band

- Origin: Charlotte, North Carolina, US
- Genres: Electro-industrial
- Years active: 1997–1998
- Label: MJ-12
- Past members: Scott Morgan; David York

Liquid Sex Decay was an electro-industrial band based in Charlotte, North Carolina. The duo was created by keyboardist David York (as D. York) and guitarist Scott Morgan (as Sid), who were formerly in the band Apparatus. They debuted with their only full-length studio album Liquid Sex Decay in 1997 before disbanding.

== History ==
Liquid Sex Decay was formed by musicians Scott Morgan and David York from the band Apparatus, which dissolved in 1995. The band issued their self-titled debut album in 1997 on MJ-12 Records and critics considered the album a direct follow-up to 1995's Apparatus. The duo wanted to continue experimenting fusing ambient, techno, industrial and electronic music while moving away from a guitar dominated sound. Later that year the band released a cover of Angelo Badalamenti's score to Twin Peaks on the various artists album TV Terror: Felching a Dead Horse by Re-Constriction Records.

== Discography ==
Studio albums

- Liquid Sex Decay (1997, MJ-12)
