= Ripped Up and So Sedated =

1993 compilation album by various artists

Compilation album by Various artists
- Released: 1993
- Genre: Electro-industrial
- Label: Re-Constriction

Re-Constriction Records V/A chronology
Rivet Head Culture (1993)	Ripped Up and So Sedated (1993)	Shut Up Kitty (1993)

Ripped Up and So Sedated is a compilation album of works by various artists, released in 1993 by Re-Constriction Records.

== Reception ==
A critic at Aiding & Abetting reviewed Ripped Up and So Sedated positively, proclaiming "Ampersand" by Eggbound as the standout track and that every band represented on the compilation deserved airplay.

== Track listing ==
Side one
No.	Title	Writer(s)	Artist	Length
1.	"Ampersand"	Chuck Basset, Bob Kissinger, Jason Ranck, Bob Sweeny	Eggbound
2.	"Stood Still"	Balance	Balance

Side two
No.	Title	Writer(s)	Artist	Length
1.	"Head of Stone" (Short Mix)	Joel Bornzin, Jon Fell, Eric Powell, Jeff Taylor	16volt
2.	"Stuck in One" (Re-Con Version)	Shonn Bratlien, Thomas Smith	Pain Emission

== Personnel ==
Adapted from the Ripped Up and So Sedated liner notes.

- Chase – compiling, design
- A.T. Tribby – cover art
- Ed Yaffa – illustrations

== Release history ==
Region	Date	Label	Format	Catalog
United States	1993	Re-Constriction	LP	REC-701
