= From the Machine =

Compilation album by Various artists
- Released: 1990
- Genre: Industrial
- Length: 47:03
- Label: Index

From the Machine is a various artists compilation album released in 1990 by Index Productions.

== Music ==
Several bands represented on From the Machine later re-released their songs in their own albums. "Mine Eyes" by Switchblade Symphony was later released on the band's debut 1991 EP Fable and 1995 album Serpentine Gallery. The track "Pharmaceutical" by Grotus was later mixed again and released on their 1991 debut studio album Brown. Diatribe's track "Cockeyed Motherfucker" also appeared on the 1990 A Reason for Living compilation and on the band's debut EP Therapy the following year.

== Reception ==
The Fifth Path gave From the Machine a positive review, chose Switchblade Symphony's contribution as a favorite and also said "I'm giving Sharkbait special mention for being "different," something like a mix of rap, rock and Nitzer Ebb."

== Track listing ==
Side one
No.	Title	Artist	Length
1.	"Exorcize"	Retina
2.	"Structures Collapse"	Blast Conservatory
3.	"Mine Eyes"	Switchblade Symphony
4.	"Little Flowers Dying"	Carbon 14
5.	"Tell Me a Lie"	Stash Kröhl

Side two
No.	Title	Artist	Length
1.	"Buy the Lie"	Constant Velocity
2.	"Pharmaceutical"	Grotus
3.	"Time Ghost"	Iao Core
4.	"Cockeyed MF"	Diatribe
5.	"Ruined Forever"	M.N.L.F.
6.	"Feel Steel"	Sharkbait

== Personnel ==
Adapted from the From the Machine liner notes.

== Release history ==
Region	Date	Label	Format	Catalog
United States	1990	Index	LP	FILE001, DL 8443
