= The Technotic Effect: A Hard Techno Compilation =

The Technotic Effect

Compilation album by Various artists
- Released: March 26, 1993
- Genre: Techno, industrial
- Length: 69:23
- Label: Re-Constriction

Re-Constriction Records V/A chronology
Grid Slinger (1993)	The Technotic Effect (1993)	Rivet Head Culture (1993)

The Technotic Effect: A Hard Techno Compilation is a various artists compilation album released on March 26, 1993, by Re-Constriction Records. Aiding & Abetting gave it a positive review, calling the album "adventurous listening for the uninitiated" that "dares to bare a little emotion (see the X Marks the Pedwalk track) and ventures towards industrial territory."

== Track listing ==
No.	Title	Artist	Length
1.	"Das Mass Der Dinge"	U-Tek	7:21
2.	"Was Meint'n Der"	Tranceformer	4:36
3.	"Plasma I-D" (Gizmo edit)	Y-Decibel	4:53
4.	"Space Balls"	Negrosex	5:21
5.	"Never Dare to Ask"	X-Marks the Pedwalk	3:56
6.	"Electrofixx" (Thug mix)	Shift	3:19
7.	"Tehniska Musika"	Noise Control	6:35
8.	"Terror"	Nautilus	9:06
9.	"Frogs in Space"	Komakino	5:15
10.	"Parametic"	Tranceformer	5:20
11.	"Cysex" (Gate Edit)	Pornotanz	4:13
12.	"Don't Look at Me" (Razormaid Mix)	Blind Vision	6:07
13.	"Komboloy" (Niguräth Mix)	A-Head	3:21

== Personnel ==
Adapted from the liner notes of The Technotic Effect: A Hard Techno Compilation.

- Andreas Tomalla – compiling

== Release history ==
Region	Date	Label	Format	Catalog
United States	1993	Re-Constriction	CD	REC-003
