= TV Terror: Felching a Dead Horse =

Compilation album by Various artists
- Released: September 23, 1997
- Genre: Industrial rock, electro-industrial
- Length: 103:13
- Label: Re-Constriction

Re-Constriction Records V/A chronology
Built for Stomping (1997)	TV Terror: Felching a Dead Horse (1997)	Got Moose? (1997)

TV Terror: Felching a Dead Horse is a various artists compilation album released on September 23, 1997, by Re-Constriction Records. The idea came to fruition when Permission founder Jayson Elliot discovered Monochrome - A Tribute to the Sisters of Mercy via a car ride through Chicago in June 1994 and compiled the music on the second disc. Its release was the cause of the first utterance of the word "felch" on national television when Kurt Loder reported its release on MTV News.

== Reception ==
Aiding & Abetting said "there are more good shots than bad ones. This is one of those pseudo-tribute albums that actually works, mostly because the artists involved didn't feel constrained by convention." Lex Marburger of Lollipop Magazine praised the tracks for the "way they hit you, make you shudder or howl with laughter, then depart before they get tiresome." Jeff Stark of SF Weekly gave the album a positive review.

A critic at Black Monday was largely negative towards the compilation, noting the covers by Numb and Alien Sex Fiend as being highlights but saying "TV Terror is to be taken lightly, with most of the music lacking in quality and merit." Sonic Boom criticized the inconsistent production while noting "there are quite a handful of selections on both discs which should both amuse and incite you to go postal near the neighborhood kids."

== Track listing ==
Disc one
No.	Title	Writer(s)	Artist	Length
1.	"Felix the Wonderful Cat"	Winston Sharples	Collide	2:17
2.	"Mr. Rogers' Neighborhood (Won't You Be My Neighbor?)"	Fred Rogers	Numb	1:50
3.	"Laverne & Shirley (Making Our Dreams Come True)" (Cyndi Grecco cover)	Charles Fox, Norman Gimbel	Alien Faktor & Pain Station	2:46
4.	"Mary Tyler Moore"	Sonny Curtis	Institute of Technology	3:03
5.	"Happy Days" (Pratt & McClain cover)	Charles Fox, Norman Gimbel	Christ Analogue	2:00
6.	"Love Boat" (Jack Jones cover)	Charles Fox, Paul Williams	16volt	4:00
7.	"Addams Family"	Vic Mizzy	29 Died	3:50
8.	"Charles in Charge"	Al Burton, Michael Jacobs, David Kurtz, Shandi Sinnamon	The Electric Hellfire Club	1:55
9.	"One Day at a Time"	Jeff Barry, Nancy Barry	Kevorkian Death Cycle	2:46
10.	"X Files"	Mark Snow	Battery	3:27
11.	"Facts of Life"	Al Burton, Gloria Loring, Alan Thicke	Hate Dept.	1:27
12.	"Magnum, P.I."	Pete Carpenter, Mike Post, Ian Freebairn-Smith	Coin of the Realm	2:34
13.	"Three's Company"	Don Nicholl, Joe Raposo	Terminal 46	2:36
14.	"Dark Shadows"	Bob Cobert	Oneiroid Psychosis	4:31
15.	"Brady Bunch"	Sherwood Schwartz, Frank De Vol	Idiot Stare	2:25
16.	"Dukes of Hazzard (Good Ol' Boys)" (Waylon Jennings cover)	Waylon Jennings	Pinchpoint	3:41
17.	"WKRP in Cincinnati"	Tom Wells, Hugh Wilson	apolitiq	2:43
18.	"Speed Racer"	Nobuyoshi Koshibe, Yoshida Yoshiyuki	Sweat Engine	1:19

Disc two
No.	Title	Writer(s)	Artist	Length
1.	"Twin Peaks"	Angelo Badalamenti	Liquid Sex Decay	3:59
2.	"The Jeffersons (Movin on Up)"	Jeff Barry, Ja'Net DuBois	cut.rate.box	2:15
3.	"Scooby Doo"	Joseph Barbera, Hoyt Curtin, William Hanna	Loretta's Doll	3:36
4.	"Welcome Back Kotter (Welcome Back)" (John Sebastian cover)	John Sebastian	Kill Switch...Klick	2:59
5.	"Batman"	Neal Hefti	Alien Sex Fiend	3:55
6.	"Fat Albert"	Bill Cosby, Samuel Denoff, Jack Elliott, William Allan Persky	haloblack	4:19
7.	"Creature Feature (Experiment in Terror)"	Henry Mancini	Stone 588	2:09
8.	"Ballad of Gilligan's Island"	Sherwood Schwartz, George Wyle	Ikon	4:00
9.	"Baretta (Keep Your Eye on the Sparrow)"	Morgan Ames, Dave Grusin	Ex-Voto	2:14
10.	"Star Trek"	Alexander Courage	Lick	3:37
11.	"Spiderman"	Bob Harris, Dana Kaproff, Stu Phillips	Wreckage	1:48
12.	"Outer Limits"	Dominic Frontiere	Coin of the Realm	4:06
13.	"Dynasty"	Bill Conti	Triple Point	3:35
14.	"Knight Rider"	Glen A. Larson, Stu Phillips	Dystopia One	2:27
15.	"And Then There's Maude"	Alan Bergman, Marilyn Bergman, Dave Grusin	The Thessalonian Dope Gods	1:40
16.	"Mary Hartman, Mary Hartman"	Barry White	Sullen	4:02
17.	"Muppet Show"	Jim Henson, Sam Pottle	My Glass Beside Yours	1:30
18.	"Josie & The Pussycats"	Joseph Barbera, Hoyt Curtin, William Hanna	Sofia Run	1:48

== Accolades ==
Year	Publication	Country	Accolade	Rank
1997	CMJ New Music Monthly	United States	"RPM"	11
"*" denotes an unordered list.

== Personnel ==
Adapted from the TV Terror: Felching a Dead Horse liner notes.

- Jayson Elliot – compiling, cover art, design
- Eric Fisher – photography
- Ric Laciak – mastering

== Release history ==
Region	Date	Label	Format	Catalog
United States	1997	Re-Constriction	CD	REC-032
