= Ging Ging =

Studio album by Purr Machine
- Released: January 13, 2000
- Genre: Electro-industrial
- Length: 65:49
- Label: Re-Constriction
- Producer: Kevin Kipnis

Purr Machine chronology
| Speak Clearly (1999) | Ging Ging (2000) | Starry (2007) |

Ging Ging is the debut studio album by Purr Machine, released on January 13, 2000, by Re-Constriction Records.

== Reception ==
Professional ratings
Review scores
| Source | Rating |
|---|---|
| AllMusic | 3/5 stars |

Steve Kurutz of Allmusic criticized Ging Ging for being "difficult album to listen to" that "create[s] a near impenetrable aural wall for listeners." Despite this, "he concluded that during the album's softer moments, "Regarding Mary" and "There's More" among them, the album does achieve moments of beauty." Aiding & Abetting praised Betsy Martin's performance and the band for drawing from a broad ranges of influences. Exclaim! critic Matt Mernagh gave it mixed review, saying "about the only thing Purr Machine won't do on their full-length debut is create a headache with their odd sounding goth electronica and fuzzy guitar."

== Track listing ==
All lyrics are written by Betsy Martin, except "Send Me an Angel" by David Sterry; all music is composed by Kevin Kipnis, except "Send Me an Angel" by Richard Zatorski.

| No. | Title | Length |
|---|---|---|
| 1. | "The Moon and My Head Are Full" | 4:15 |
| 2. | "Regarding Mary" | 7:03 |
| 3. | "Speak Clearly" | 4:52 |
| 4. | "Darjeeling" | 2:51 |
| 5. | "Keep Calm" | 5:50 |
| 6. | "Perspicuous Minds" | 5:29 |
| 7. | "Circumstance" | 4:00 |
| 8. | "Phoebe" | 7:15 |
| 9. | "The Enormity of It All" | 5:51 |
| 10. | "Cerebellum" | 4:57 |
| 11. | "Anice" | 3:50 |
| 12. | "Send Me an Angel" (Real Life cover) | 4:58 |
| 13. | "There's More" | 4:38 |

== Personnel ==
Adapted from the Ging Ging liner notes.

Purr Machine

- Kirk Hellie – guitar
- Kevin Kipnis – bass guitar, guitar, programming, production, mixing
- Betsy Martin – lead vocals, acoustic guitar, loops, noises

Additional performers

- Kevin Choby (as Monkey Boy) – vocals (6)
- Michael Ciravolo – guitar (11)
- Kevin Pinnt – drum programming (7)

Production and design

- Susan Adams – photography
- Stan Gaz – illustrations
- Kevin M Robie – cover art, design
- Brad Vance – mastering

== Release history ==
| Region | Date | Label | Format | Catalog |
|---|---|---|---|---|
| United States | 2000 | Re-Constriction | CD | REC-038 |
