= 9mm Grudge =

Studio album by Non-Aggression Pact
- Released: March 1994
- Studio: 1X Studios: (Tampa, FL)
- Genre: Industrial
- Length: 56:10
- Label: Re-Constriction
- Producer: Jeff Hillard; Jason Whitcomb

Non-Aggression Pact chronology
Gesticulate (1992)	9mm Grudge (1994)	Broadcast-Quality Belligerence (1999)

9mm Grudge is the second studio album by Non-Aggression Pact, released in March 1994 by Re-Constriction Records. The album peaked at No. 21 on the CMJ RPM Charts.

== Reception ==
Aiding & Abetting gave 9mm Grudge a positive review, calling it "a pleasant industrial-dance outing, with lyrics more biting than the background noise." Option said "the thing that distinguishes Non-Aggression Pact from every other industrial dance project is the overload of vague, anti-racism voice samples that are littered throughout this disc."

== Track listing ==
All tracks are written by Jeff Hillard, except "Flask" and "Bleeding Messiah" co-written with Jason Whitcomb.

No.	Title	Length
1.	"Join Hands"	3:01
2.	"Blind Facts"	4:23
3.	"Bleeding Messiah"	3:54
4.	"Wicked Prelude"	1:03
5.	"Wicked Painted Sun"	2:51
6.	"Flask"	7:21
7.	"Powder Keg"	3:51
8.	"Der Angriff" (Battered Again Remix)	3:40
9.	"Choking"	5:17
10.	"Guided by Lust"	4:23
11.	"1 KHZ"	4:21
12.	"Illusion of Freedom"	5:42
13.	"Data Rape"	4:03
14.	"Gages Theme"	2:20

== Personnel ==
Adapted from the 9mm Grudge liner notes.

Non-Aggression Pact

- Jeff Hillard – drums, keyboards, sampler, programming, production, engineering, photography, remix (8)
- Jason Whitcomb – lead vocals, keyboards, sampler, programming, production, engineering

Additional performers

- Dan Bates – bass guitar (9, 13), scratching (13)

Production and design

- Chase – design
- Ben Dunn – illustrations
- Trevor Henthorn – mastering
- Theresa Milam – cover art, typesetting
- Joseph Wight – illustrations

== Release history ==
Region	Date	Label	Format	Catalog
United States	1994	Re-Constriction	CD	REC-010
