= Apparatus (album) =

Studio album by Apparatus
- Released: August 1, 1995
- Recorded: Various: Hole Note; (Matthews, NC); Studio B; (Charlotte, NC)
- Genre: Electro-industrial
- Length: 30:33
- Label: Re-Constriction
- Producer: Blake Barnes; Scott Morgan; Lee Popa; David York

Apparatus is the eponymously titled and only album by Apparatus, released on August 1, 1995, by Re-Constriction Records. Promotional music videos were filmed for the songs "Come Alive" and "Hell's Home". After the album's publication the trio disbanded, with keyboardist David York and guitarist Scott Morgan forming the band Liquid Sex Decay later.

== Reception ==
Aiding & Abetting praised Apparatus for their aggressive sound, saying the band "has put together a wild ride that massages both the club folks and metal freaks." Alternative Press also gave Apparatus a positive review, saying it "emulates the sound of rage." A critic at Black Monday commended the band for their originality and placed the album at their top five albums of the year. Fabryka Music Magazine gave the album three out of four possible stars and said "this album deserves a purchase not only by coldwave style lovers but also by many bands in today's crisis of identity." Sonic Boom gave the album a somewhat mixed review but commended the musical programming and said "I definitely found myself wondering why there weren't twice as many tracks on the album because surely the band has the talent for that many original tracks."

== Track listing ==
All tracks are written by Blake Barnes, Scott Morgan and David York

No.	Title	Length
1.	"Ministry of Rage"	1:23
2.	"Come Alive"	4:01
3.	"Womb" (Coathanger Mix)	4:58
4.	"Hell's Home"	4:03
5.	"Slave or Payer"	3:12
6.	"Cock Panther"	1:34
7.	"Baal"	3:50
8.	"Wrench"	4:51
9.	"Aria for 1,000 Heads"	2:41

== Personnel ==
Adapted from the Apparatus liner notes.

Apparatus

- Blake Barnes – lead vocals, arrangements, production
- Scott Morgan (as Sid) – electric guitar, arrangements, production
- David York (as D. York) – keyboards, electronics, arrangements, production, mixing (1, 4, 5, 9)

Production and design

- Kelli Brinkley – photography
- Dave Harris – mastering, engineering (2–7), mixing (2, 3, 6–8)
- Mary Lawing – cover art
- Lee Popa – production and mixing (4, 5), arrangements (4)

== Release history ==
Region	Date	Label	Format	Catalog
United States	1995	Re-Constriction	CD	REC-018
