= The Bitcrusher Remixes =

Remix album by Christ Analogue
- Released: December 7, 2004
- Studio: Brooklyn Central (New York City, NY)
- Genre: Industrial rock
- Length: 66:31
- Label: Architecture/Flagrant
- Producer: Wade Alin

Christ Analogue chronology
Everyday Is Distortion (2003)	The Bitcrusher Remixes (2004)

The Bitcrusher Remixes is remix album by Christ Analogue, released on December 7, 2004, by Architecture and Flagrant Records.

== Track listing ==
All tracks are written by Wade Alin, Rey Guajardo and Markus Von Prause.

No.	Title	Remixer(s)	Length
1.	"Sore" (Bit-Drop Mix)	Rey Guajardo	3:38
2.	"Ana" (A Hole in the District of Columbia Mix)	Wade Alin	3:43
3.	"Sore" (Headache Mix)	hEADaCHE	3:54
4.	"Piss"		3:44
5.	"So Brand New" (The Denver Incident Mix)	Sister Machine Gun	6:32
6.	"Hemisphere" (In 4 Easy Parts for Fat People Mix)	Defragmentation	3:53
7.	"Sore" (Tussin Rub Mix)	Monstrum Sepsis	5:38
8.	"Sore" (Manifest One Mix)	Shok	4:21
9.	"Impure" (Penal Colony Funktravox Mix)	Penal Colony	4:16
10.	"A Slight Rage" (PTI Downmix)	PTI	5:15
11.	"A Slight Rage" (An Evening With the Starfuckers Mix)	SMP, Wade Alin	4:28
12.	"A Slight Rage" (Lasseration Mix)	Rey Guajardo	4:05
13.	"Sustain" (Minor Solution Mix)	Cylab	4:00
14.	"Brxxthe"		3:13
15.	"Sore" (Pacific Mix)	Shok	5:53

== Personnel ==
Adapted from The Bitcrusher Remixes liner notes.

Christ Analogue

- Wade Alin – lead vocals, programming, production

== Release history ==
Region	Date	Label	Format	Catalog
United States	2004	Architecture/Flagrant	CD	ARR001, FLAGRANT0002
