= Waiting for God (album) =

Studio album by Waiting for God
- Released: 1994
- Genre: Electro-industrial
- Length: 30:27
- Label: KMG
- Producer: Tom Ferris

Waiting for God chronology
| Waiting for God (1994) | Desipramine (1997) |

Alternative cover
- 1996 reissue cover

Waiting for God is the self-titled debut studio album of Waiting for God, released in late 1994 by KMG. The album was re-issued as Quarter Inch Thick by Re-Constriction Records in 1996 with an expanded track listing featuring bonus remixes.

== Reception ==
Aiding & Abetting gave Waiting for God a positive review, saying "there are plenty of diverse elements woven into this fabric" and "Daemon Cadman's lighter-than-air vocals mix well with the edgy guitars and sea of keyboards brought in by the rest of the band." Sonic Boom also praised Cadman's vocal prowess, saying "the steadfast vocal style and the music coupled together create a very unique sound that lacks any obvious evidence of outside musical influence that plagues many a new band." Scott Hefflon of Lollipop Magazine gave the album a more mixed review and criticized the material for being too dance oriented.

== Track listing ==
All tracks are written by Daemon Cadman, Martin Myers and Greg Price

| No. | Title | Length |
|---|---|---|
| 1. | "1000 Pieces" | 3:53 |
| 2. | "Apologies" | 5:08 |
| 3. | "Revenge" | 4:11 |
| 4. | "Two Extremes" | 4:26 |
| 5. | "Remember" | 4:21 |
| 6. | "Inside" | 4:52 |
| 7. | "Quarter Inch Thick" | 3:36 |

| No. | Title | Remixer(s) | Length |
|---|---|---|---|
| 8. | "1000 Pieces" (Sonic Deconstruction Club Mix) | Eric Chalmers, Martin Myers |
| 9. | "Sickness Ridden Soul Machine" |

| No. | Title | Remixer(s) | Length |
|---|---|---|---|
| 1. | "1000 Pieces" | | 3:56 |
| 2. | "Apologies" | | 5:20 |
| 3. | "Revenge" | | 4:16 |
| 4. | "Two Extremes" | | 4:29 |
| 5. | "Remember" | | 4:25 |
| 6. | "Inside" | | 5:02 |
| 7. | "Quarter Inch Thick" | | 3:40 |
| 8. | "2 Extremes" (Priceless Mix) | Greg Price | 6:00 |
| 9. | "Sickness Ridden Soul Machine" | | 3:37 |
| 10. | "1000 Pieces" (Gin & Sin Remix) | Eric Chalmers, Martin Myers | 5:27 |
| 11. | "2 Extremes" (Dextrose Mix) | Dextrose | 4:31 |
| 12. | "2 Extremes" (PolyGod Mix) | Christ Analogue | 5:06 |
| 13. | "Quarter Inch Thick" (Remixed By Collide) | Collide | 4:18 |

== Personnel ==
Adapted from the Waiting for God liner notes.

Waiting for God

- Daemon Cadman – lead vocals
- Martin Myers – guitar, keyboards, programming
- Greg Price – drums

Additional performers

- Doug Nolan – guitar (2)
- Jed Simon – guitar (1)

Production and design

- Cyberkrishna Media – design
- Tom Ferris – production, mixing

== Release history ==
| Region | Date | Label | Format | Catalog |
|---|---|---|---|---|
| 1994 | Canada | KMG | CD | 001 |
| 1995 | Germany | Synthetic Symphony | CD | SPV 085-61332 |
| 1996 | United States | Re-Constriction | CD | REC-030 |
