= Gesticulate (album) =

Studio album by Non-Aggression Pact
- Released: 1992
- Recorded: 1991 – 1992
- Studio: Axium Studios (Tampa, FL)
- Genre: Industrial
- Length: 51:59
- Label: GPC Productions
- Producer: Jeff Hillard; Jason Whitcomb

Non-Aggression Pact chronology
Non-Aggression Pact (1992)	Gesticulate (1992)	9mm Grudge (1994)

Gesticulate is the debut studio album by Non-Aggression Pact, released in 1992 by GPC Productions.

== Reception ==
Professional ratings
Review scores
Source	Rating
AllMusic	2/5 stars

William I. Lengeman III of AllMusic notes the "hard-edged industrial-styled beats (b.p.m. included) from Jason Whitcomb and Jeff Hillard on a variety of electronics, percussion and vocals, with guest bass and piano from Dan Bates. Several of the 12 tracks feature vocals, and the rest are sample-heavy instrumentals."

== Track listing ==
All tracks are written by Jeff Hillard and Jason Whitcomb, except "Boy" by Ted Ottaviano.

No.	Title	Writer(s)	Length
1.	"Enigmatic Theory Enema"		4:34
2.	"Boy" (LAPD Nightstick Remix) (Book of Love cover)	Ted Ottaviano	4:04
3.	"Unify"		4:25
4.	"Give"		4:37
5.	"Der Angriff (The Assault)"		3:39
6.	"Flesh Mecca"		3:50
7.	"Hymn"		4:24
8.	"Done"		3:35
9.	"The Holy Babble"		3:14
10.	"Propaganda"		4:47
11.	"The Debriefing"		5:08
12.	"Boy" (Milk the Media Mix) (Book of Love cover)	Ottaviano	4:57

== Personnel ==
Adapted from the Gesticulate liner notes.

Non-Aggression Pact

- Jeff Hillard – drums, keyboards, sampler, programming, remix (2, 12)
- Jason Whitcomb – lead vocals, keyboards, sampler, programming

Additional performers

- Dan Bates – bass guitar (3, 8), piano (8)

Production and design

- Shaun Egger – recording
- Paul Rowe – cover art, design

== Release history ==
Region	Date	Label	Format	Catalog
United States	1992	GPC	CD, CS	GPCD01
United States	2009		DL	
