= Speak Clearly =

EP by Purr Machine
- Released: March 1999
- Genre: Electro-industrial
- Length: 45:16
- Label: Re-Constriction

Purr Machine chronology
Speak Clearly (1999)	Ging Ging (2000)

Speak Clearly is the debut EP of Purr Machine, released in March 1999 by Re-Constriction Records.

== Reception ==
Aiding & Abetting gave Speak Clearly a positive review, saying "There's a reason for this disc. These remixes take the basic Purr Machine idea and connect it to other nodes in the universe. Precisely what this sort of single is supposed to do."

== Track listing ==
All lyrics are written by Betsy Martin, except "Girl, You'll Be a Woman Soon" by Neil Diamond; all music is composed by Kevin Kipnis, except "Girl, You'll Be a Woman Soon" by Neil Diamond.

No.	Title	Remixer(s)	Length
1.	"Speak Clearly"		3:59
2.	"Speak Clearly" (Ge41 Mix)	Boom chr Paige	4:06
3.	"Speak Clearly" (Tommy Boy Mix)	Tom Muschitz	4:19
4.	"Phoebe" (Lo-fi Felidae Mix)	Boom chr Paige	3:48
5.	"Girl, You'll Be a Woman Soon (Rehash Mix)" (Neil Diamond cover)	Tom Muschitz	4:55
6.	"Speak Clearly" (Lowicide Mix)	Boom chr Paige	4:20
7.	"Keep Calm" (Gaucho Mix)	Tom Muschitz	5:37
8.	"Phoebe" (Demo Version)		4:53
58.	"Untitled" (hidden track)		5:30

== Personnel ==
Adapted from the Speak Clearly liner notes.

Purr Machine

- Kirk Hellie – guitar
- Kevin Kipnis – bass guitar, programming
- Betsy Martin – lead vocals

== Release history ==
Region	Date	Label	Format	Catalog
United States	1999	Re-Constriction	CD	CSREC-038
