= Tried + True =

Studio album by Tinfed
- Released: August 22, 2000
- Studio: The Plant Studios
- Genre: Alternative rock
- Length: 43:05
- Label: Hollywood
- Producer: Ed Buller

Tinfed chronology
Hypersonic Hyperphonic (1996)	Tried + True (2000)	Designated Rivals (2003)

Professional ratings
Review scores
Source	Rating
AllMusic	3/5 stars

Tried + True is the third and final studio album by American rock band Tinfed. It was released on August 22, 2000, via Hollywood Records. Production was handled by Ed Buller, known for his work with English groups such as Suede, Spiritualized and Slowdive. The album also contains "Immune", which was featured in the 2000 film Mission: Impossible 2 and appeared on its soundtrack.

== Reception ==
Stanton Swihart of AllMusic gave the album a mixed review and criticised the band for sounding too derivative of Britpop groups such as Radiohead and Travis, saying "they ultimately fail to attain the same levels of esoteric complexity as those bands." Swihart concluded his review saying the band's best material may be ahead of them: "While Tinfed is not unequivocally successful or innovative on a sonic level, it is frequently exciting and a terribly promising effort from a band that may eventually cast its own considerable shadow". CMJ reviewed it more positively, calling Tried + True a "forward-thinking rock record with plenty of potential commercial appeal" that "contains pretty guitar pop enhanced only minimally by studio machinery".

== Track listing ==
All tracks are written by Tinfed.

No.	Title	Length
1.	"Arrange"	3:05
2.	"Way Thru"	3:14
3.	"Immune"	3:48
4.	"Drop"	3:58
5.	"Never Was Sure"	4:18
6.	"Always/Never"	2:45
7.	"Halo"	3:22
8.	"Mouth as Sharp"	3:41
9.	"Idol"	3:44
10.	"Overrated"	3:03
11.	"Dangergirl"	3:51
12.	"It's Late"	4:16

== Personnel ==
Adapted from the Tried + True liner notes.

Tinfed

- Matt McCord – drums, percussion
- Rey Osburn – lead vocals, electric guitar, electronics
- Eric Stenman – electric guitar, bass guitar
- Rick Verrett – bass guitar

Production

- Ed Buller – production, engineering, mixing
- Enrique Gonzalez Muller – engineering

== Release history ==
Region	Date	Label	Format	Catalog
United States	2000	Hollywood	CD	TR-68107
