= The Texture ov Despise =

Studio album by Christ Analogue
- Released: May 1995
- Studio: The Razor (Seattle, WA)
- Genre: Industrial rock
- Length: 44:42
- Label: Manifest
- Producer: Wade Alin

Christ Analogue chronology
The Texture ov Despise (1995)	Optima (1996)

The Texture ov Despise is the debut studio album of Christ Analogue, released in May 1995 by Manifest Records.

== Reception ==
A critic at Sonic Boom praised the band's' unique sound and said "the caustic mesh behind the guitar work, the harsh vocals, and programming is often intense and overwhelming."

== Track listing ==
All tracks are written by Wade Alin, except "Product of the Rape" by Rey Guajardo and Markus Von Prause.

No.	Title	Length
1.	"The God of Crack"	1:13
2.	"Intervention"	0:55
3.	"Antipathy"	5:18
4.	"Southern Baptist Result"	0:50
5.	"Surface Like Nerve"	5:14
6.	"Lie of the Mind"	2:16
7.	"Divine Intervention"	1:14
8.	"Product of the Rape"	5:29
9.	"Withdrawal Method - Type 1"	1:24
10.	"Withdrawal Method - Type 2"	3:05
11.	"Fracture"	4:49
12.	"The Religious Experience of Mankind"	5:28
13.	"I Believe in Slavery"	4:37
14.	"Sour Nation"	2:50

== Personnel ==
Adapted from the album's liner notes.

Christ Analogue

- Wade Alin – programming, arrangements, production

Additional musicians

- Casha – instruments (6)
- Rey Guajardo – instruments and arrangements (8)

Production and design

- Chrome – design
- Markus Von Prause – assistant engineering, instruments (1)

== Release history ==
Region	Date	Label	Format	Catalog
1995	United States	Manifest	CD	001-4
