= Funky Alternatives Seven =

Compilation album by Various artists
- Released: 1993
- Genre: Electro-industrial
- Length: 59:08
- Label: Concrete

Funky Alternatives Seven is a various artists compilation album released in 1993 by Concrete Productions.

== Reception ==
Randolph Heard of Option gave a Funky Alternatives Seven and claimed "manly growling and bleating over lead-footed beats and pop-culture sampling depict a cartoonish cyberpunk world full of diseased machines, rabid Christians, terminal drug abuse and, of course, cop killing." He went on to say "the more techno-oriented cuts, the hyper, plastic rhythms tend to take the sting out of the industrial sound, which turns the crashing guitars, distorted vocals and aura of destruction into mere flavoring for the techno beat."

== Track listing ==
No.	Title	Lyrics	Music	Artist	Length
1.	"Hoodlum Priest" (Exclusive Remix)	Derek Thompson	Derek Thompson	Hoodlum Priest	5:27
2.	"Metal Machine Music" (Exclusive Remix)	Jürgen Engler	Mary Buck; Ralf Dörper; Rüdiger Esch	Die Krupps	5:27
3.	"Rebuff!" (Exclusive Mix)	Ane Hebeisen	Michael Antener; Ane Hebeisen	Swamp Terrorists	6:15
4.	"Shotgun Blues" (Exclusive Mix)	Tom Withers	Tom Withers	Klute	1:59
5.	"God Fear" (Exclusive Technodistortion Remix)	Richard McKinlay	Richard McKinlay	Electro Assassin	5:42
6.	"Relief"	Tod Ashley	Tod Ashley; Jim Coleman; Steven McMillen; Jack Natz; Phil Puleo	Cop Shoot Cop	2:51
7.	"Father Don't Cry" (Exclusive Edit)	Kevin Crompton; Dwayne R. Goettel; Dave Ogilvie	Kevin Crompton; Dwayne R. Goettel; Dave Ogilvie	Doubting Thomas	8:36
8.	"Kingpin" (Exclusive Remix)	Marc Jameson	Marc Jameson; Kevin Marburg; Vince Montalbano; Pat Toves	Diatribe	5:51
9.	"Florence Is Dead" (Exclusive Angel Mix)	Alessandro Micheli	Maurizio Fasolo; Paolo Favati; Davide Ragonesi	Pankow	5:03
10.	"Solid State" (Exclusive Remix)	Sean Bailey; Ian Hicks	Sean Bailey; Ian Hicks	Johnson Engineering Co.	5:55
11.	"Area 51" (Exclusive Remix)	Graham Cupples; David Mitchell; Andy Phillips; Darren Till	Graham Cupples; David Mitchell; Andy Phillips; Darren Till	Code	6:00

== Personnel ==
Adapted from the Funky Alternatives Seven liner notes.

- Carl Edwards – design
- Judson Leach – mastering

== Release history ==
Region	Date	Label	Format	Catalog
United Kingdom	1993	Concrete	CD	CPROD CD021
