= Everyday Is Distortion =

Studio album by Christ Analogue
- Released: August 15, 2003
- Studio: Brooklyn Central (New York City)
- Length: 59:32
- Label: Flagrant
- Producer: Wade Alin

Christ Analogue chronology
In Radiant Decay (1997)	Everyday Is Distortion (2003)	The Bitcrusher Remixes (2004)

Everyday Is Distortion is the third studio album by Christ Analogue, released on August 15, 2003, by Flagrant Records.

== Track listing ==
All tracks are written by Wade Alin, Rey Guajardo and Markus Von Prause

No.	Title	Length
1.	"So Brand New"	4:31
2.	"Ana"	4:29
3.	"American Glamour Girl"	1:54
4.	"Sore"	4:07
5.	"Hemisphere"	3:21
6.	"Bitchwarmer"	4:00
7.	"Everyone Is Looking"	3:15
8.	"A Slight Rage"	5:08
9.	"Consequence"	3:36
10.	"Fathom"	4:20
11.	"Sustain"	3:12
12.	"The Wrong Man"	2:50
13.	"Fair Game"	3:23
14.	"Ana V2"	4:55
15.	"The Talker"	2:08
16.	"Impure (Technically)"	4:23

== Personnel ==
Adapted from the album's liner notes.

Christ Analogue

- Wade Alin – lead vocals, programming, production, mixing
- Markus Von Prause – synthesizer, vocals

Additional musicians

- Charlie Lormé – drum programming
- Joe Schill – programming

Production and design

- Immaculate – cover art
- Shawn McClough – photography

== Release history ==
Region	Date	Label	Format	Catalog
United States	2003	Flagrant	CD	FLAGRANT0001
