= A Reason for Living =

Compilation album by Various artists
- Released: 1990
- Genres: Punk rock; Industrial rock
- Label: Santa Cruz Skateboards
- Producer: Ray Stevens II

Alternative cover
- VHS cover

A Reason for Living is a various artists compilation album released on cassette tape and fifty-seven minute VHS in 1990 by Santa Cruz Skateboards. "Cockeyed Motherfucker" was also released on From the Machine by Index Productions and later on Diatribe debut EP Therapy in 1991.

== Track listing ==
Side one
No.	Title	Artist	Length
1.	"Solitary Confinement" (1977)	The Weirdos
2.	"Song That Ate Spider Baby"	Spider Baby
3.	"Laws"	Sioux Nation
4.	"Rooster Crest Swamp Villians"	Penal Kennel
5.	"We Got Soul"	Big Boys
6.	"(There's a Party) On James Dean's Grave Tonight"	Screamin' Lord Salba & His Heavy Friends
7.	"Looking for You"	The Faction
8.	"Cockeyed Motherfucker"	Diatribe

Side two
No.	Title	Artist	Length
1.	"King Kan"	The Bone Shavers
2.	"Joe Done Gone"	Goodbye Gemini
3.	"Little Kings and Queens"	The Odd Numbers
4.	"Revealed by Composed Nature"	Bad Mutha Goose and The Brothers Grimm
5.	"Bad Medication"	BL'AST!

== Personnel ==
Adapted from the A Reason for Living liner notes.

- Bill Darm – engineering
- Steve Keenan – photography
- John Munnerlyn – design
- Rich Novak – executive-production
- Gavin O'Brien – compiling
- Dolly Phillips – design
- Ray Stevens II – production, compiling
- Miki Vuckovich – photography

== Release history ==
Region	Date	Label	Format	Catalog
United States	1990	Santa Cruz Skateboards	CS, VHS	
