= Scavengers in the Matrix =

Compilation album by Various artists
- Released: June 10, 1994
- Genre: Electro-industrial
- Length: 76:58
- Label: If It Moves...

Re-Constriction Records V/A chronology
| Shut Up Kitty (1993) | Scavengers in the Matrix (1994) | Crowbar America (1994) |

Scavengers in the Matrix is a various artists compilation album released on June 10, 1994 by If It Moves....

== Reception ==
Aiding & Abetting called described Scavengers in the Matrix as being "truly experimental dance music" and "like most compilations, production values and music quality do vary, but as usual, Chase has brought a load of great stuff together, weeding out the chaff."

== Track listing ==
| No. | Title | Writer(s) | Artist | Length |
|---|---|---|---|---|
| 1. | "Drown" | Zul Arifin | Primal Engine | 6:16 |
| 2. | "Zygote" | Dan Gatto, Daniel Vahnke | Recliner | 4:00 |
| 3. | "I Am Truth" | Coby Bassett, Dean Love, Steven Ortiz, Steven Seibold | Hate Dept. | 3:14 |
| 4. | "F/2.8" | "Big C" Jones, Jon Bondelli, Mel Hammond, Nikki Camcam III | Colla Destra | 4:48 |
| 5. | "Glass" | James Basore, John Belew, Marc Phillips, Christian Void | Killing Floor | 4:40 |
| 6. | "Hate" (Flesh Mix) | Keith Arem, Jack Boughner, Mical Pedriana, David Smith | Biohazard PCB | 5:21 |
| 7. | "Gun Lover" | Ethan Novak, Gregory A. Lopez, Jason Novak | Acumen | 4:48 |
| 8. | "Guilt" (Trip Mix) | Timothy Wiles | Death Method | 4:18 |
| 9. | "Halidified" (Subgenius Mix) | Jason Hubbard, Dee Madden, Andy Shaw, Chris Shinkus | Penal Colony | 4:09 |
| 10. | "Stalemate" | Jason Bazinet, Sean Ivy | SMP | 6:02 |
| 11. | "Submit" | Greg Davis, Torsten Hartwell, Mike Paikos, Lee Pennington, Randy Rai, Alan Sartirana, Mike Welch | Slave Unit | 4:30 |
| 12. | "Insecure" | Shonn Bratlien, Johan Sherriffs, Thomas Patrick Smith | Pain Emission | 4:36 |
| 13. | "Chaos" | William Hayden, Keith York | apolitiq | 4:55 |
| 14. | "In Darkness" | Electric Don, Trevor Henthorn, Tymo Raek | Sweat Engine | 2:53 |
| 15. | "Like the Plague" | Michael Gunn, Jeff Tatman | Death Industry | 4:32 |
| 16. | "Dominion" | Eric Stenman, Giovanni Mercado, Rey Osburn | Tinfed | 4:41 |
| 17. | "Growing Stronger" (Steroid Mix) | Chad Bishop, Allan King, Shayde Sartin, David Skott, Shane Talada | STG | 3:15 |

== Personnel ==
Adapted from the Scavengers in the Matrix liner notes.

- Chase – compiling, design
- Benn Dunn – illustrations
- Trevor Henthorn – mastering

== Release history ==
| Region | Date | Label | Format | Catalog |
|---|---|---|---|---|
| United States | 1994 | If It Moves... | CD | IIM-004 |
