= In Radiant Decay =

Studio album by Christ Analogue
- Released: April 8, 1997
- Recorded: 1996
- Studio: The Razor (Seattle, WA)
- Genre: Industrial rock, electronic rock
- Length: 38:22
- Label: Cargo/Re-Constriction
- Producer: Wade Alin

Christ Analogue chronology
Optima (1996)	In Radiant Decay (1997)	Everyday Is Distortion (2003)

In Radiant Decay is the second studio album by Christ Analogue, released on April 8, 1997, by Cargo Music and Re-Constriction Records. Compared to the band's punk-styled live performances, the album displays more of the band's talent for combining industrial, techno and indie rock into an electronic music format.

== Production and music ==
The technology used to record In Radiant Decay included Digidesign's Pro Tools software, an Akai S3000, E-mu Emax II and Morpheus, Korg Prophecy, Kurzweil K2000, and Roland Juno-1 06. When asked about how producing the album compared to the band's experience working previously, Wade Alin stated:

This time we've grown and changed, as we hope to do with each album. More than everything, we had better technology to work with, and also I was tired of suppressing my sense of melody to be considered an 'industrial' band. When we started working on the album, there were no limitations; it was a free-for-all. If there was a melody that worked for us, then we were going to use it.

== Reception ==
Aiding & Abetting gave In Radiant Decay a negative review, calling "a middling rehash" and that "Christ Analogue has very little new ideas to bring to the cold wave (or is it cybercore? I get so confused) table." Larry Dean Miles at Black Monday described the album as "a direction of industrial music evolution that doesn't compromise in sound or soul as so many others have." Keyboard disagreed, calling the music "rich with emotion and intensity but devoid of the typical distortion and calamity" and "extensive use of sequencers and industrial beats combined with organic instruments create a 21st Century pastiche of sounds that escapes a tight pigeonhole." Sonic Boom also gave the album a positive review, calling it an "album of maturity and a summation of all the trials and tribulations that Christ Analogue was exposed to since its inception" while noting that "the use of lo-fi sound elements has taken its toll on the composite sound quality of the final mix down."

== Track listing ==
All tracks are written by Wade Alin, Rey Guajardo and Markus Von Prause.

No.	Title	Length
1.	"No Daughter Icon"	4:01
2.	"This Shall Not Breathe"	4:04
3.	"Optima"	4:18
4.	"Grain"	4:29
5.	"Cradle and Debase"	3:52
6.	"Wear"	3:54
7.	"Rigor"	4:05
8.	"Unclean"	5:15
9.	"Cold Magnetic Sun"	4:24

== Personnel ==
Adapted from the In Radiant Decay liner notes.

Christ Analogue

- Wade Alin – lead vocals, programming, guitar, bass guitar, production, recording
- Rey Guajardo – drum programming, programming, vocals, assistant engineering
- Markus Von Prause – synthesizer, sampler, programming, vocals, assistant engineering

Additional musicians

- Tracy Moody – guitar

Production and design

- Dana Brett – photography
- Jason Graham – photography
- Immaculate – cover art
- Shawn McClough – photography
- Robert Sydow – live engineering

== Release history ==
Region	Date	Label	Format	Catalog
United States	1997	Cargo/Re-Constriction	CD	CRGD 84054, REC-028
