= Starry (Purr Machine album) =

Studio album by Purr Machine
- Released: March 16, 2007
- Recorded: 2006
- Genre: Electro-industrial
- Length: 66:09
- Label: No Bliss Lost
- Producer: Kevin Kipnis

Purr Machine chronology
Ging Ging (2000)	Starry (2007)

Starry is the second studio album by Purr Machine, released on March 16, 2007 by No Bliss Lost Records. The album was recorded with the collaborative efforts of Chris Vrenna of Nine Inch Nails/Tweaker, William Faith of Faith and the Muse, electronic artist Alex Gordon, Statik from Collide and guitarist Byron Brown of Mercurine.

== Track listing ==
All lyrics are written by Betsy Martin; all music is composed by Kevin Kipnis.

No.	Title	Length
1.	"Get Close"	2:55
2.	"Sad I'm Gone"	3:56
3.	"Monkey Dreams"	4:09
4.	"Nefarious"	5:12
5.	"Elasticized"	4:32
6.	"Keep Me in Mind"	4:14
7.	"Everlast"	4:35
8.	"Starry"	4:28
9.	"Ember"	0:28
10.	"Choose Your Fire"	2:51
11.	"Not Any More"	4:41
12.	"The Warning"	4:49
13.	"Holding Back the Tears"	6:48
14.	"Universe"	5:08
15.	"Sister"	7:23

== Personnel ==
Adapted from the Starry liner notes.

Purr Machine

- Kevin Kipnis – bass guitar, guitar, programming, keyboards, production, mixing
- Betsy Martin – lead vocals, photography

Additional performers

- Byron Brown – guitar (3, 12, 14)
- Charlie – vocals (4)
- William Faith – guitar (15)
- Alex Gordon – guitar (13, 15), additional production (15)
- Kirk Hellie – guitar (2, 4, 10)
- Todd Shoemaker – drums (13)
- Statik – drum programming (2, 11)
- Janice Stone – vocals (15), photography
- Chris Vrenna – drums (2, 4, 10, 15), arrangements (14)

Production and design

- Chad Blinman – additional production and additional mixing (10–12, 15)
- Tony Hoffer – vocal treatments (10)
- Gary Silva – photography
- Pierre Silva – photography
- Monica Richards – design

== Release history ==
Region	Date	Label	Format	Catalog
United States	2007	No Bliss Lost	CD	NBLR-001
Germany	2007	Pandaimonium	CD	PAN-61
