= Rivet Head Culture =

Compilation album by Various artists
- Released: May 30, 1993
- Genre: Electro-industrial
- Length: 77:39
- Label: If It Moves...

Re-Constriction Records V/A chronology
The Technotic Effect (1993)	Rivet Head Culture (1993)	Ripped Up and So Sedated (1993)

Rivet Head Culture is a various artists compilation album released on May 30, 1993 by If It Moves....

== Reception ==
A critic at Sonic Boom praised the Rivet Head Culture compilation, saying "it amazes me that bands like A-Politiq, Death Method and M.A.S. still remain hidden from record labels" and "Chase has done the entire industrial music industry a huge favor by digging through the mountains of demo tapes he receives for some of the best unsigned talent in the industry."

== Track listing ==
No.	Title	Writer(s)	Artist	Length
1.	"Wicked Painted Sun"	Jeff Hillard, Jason Whitcomb	Non-Aggression Pact	2:42
2.	"Mein Klein Engel (My Little Angel)"	Timothy Wiles	Death Method	4:30
3.	"Satellite Thought (Taken Out Life)"	Dana Gumbiner, Britton Holland, Matt Holland	Little Guilt Shrine	3:57
4.	"Nose Dive"	Dan Gatto, Daniel Vahnke	Recliner	2:59
5.	"Perversion (Of the Truth)"	Todd Christenson, James Frisch	Stash Krohl	3:23
6.	"More Like Me"	Steven Seibold	Hate Dept.	3:02
7.	"Neurozone"	Jared Louche, Dylan Thomas Moore	Chemlab	5:33
8.	"Raw Dog"	Dave Ogilvie, Kevin Ogilvie, Rose Ogilvie	Raw Dog	4:39
9.	"Selfish"	Shonn Bratlien, Barry Dost, Johan Sherriffs, Thomas Smith	Pain Emission	4:43
10.	"Party Girl"	Dave Creadeau, Boom chr Paige	Society Burning	3:32
11.	"Admire the Question" (Naïve Mix)	Mark Alan Miller	Out Out	4:25
12.	"Progression"	John D. Norten	Blue Eyed Christ	4:08
13.	"Televandalism" (Drive-By Judas Mix)	Chad Bishop, Allan King, Shayde Sartin	STG	3:42
14.	"Cold (Insight)"	Seann Vowell, Steve Watkins	Scar Tissue	3:39
15.	"Black Box"	William Hayden, Keith York	Apolitiq	4:44
16.	"Send Me to Heaven"	Steve Lenos	The M.A.S.	4:25
17.	"Growing Stronger" (Steroid Mix)	Mick Hale, R.A. Werner, vMarkus	Crocodile Shop	3:58
18.	"Whitley Park"	Michael J. Fasano, J. Eliot Goldberg, Jason Thretcher, Ray Usher	They Killed Fritz	4:13
19.	"Santa in Flames"	Jim Coursey, Mark Edwards	Fleshhouse	5:26

== Personnel ==
Adapted from the Rivet Head Culture liner notes.

- Chase – compiling, design, typesetting
- John Gire – illustrations
- Trevor Henthorn – mastering
- Kristin Martin – typesetting
- Paulkun Noy – design

== Release history ==
Region	Date	Label	Format	Catalog
United States	1993	If It Moves...	CD	IIM-003
