= Torture Tech Overdrive =

Compilation album by Various artists
- Released: 1991
- Genre: Electro-industrial
- Length: 42:25
- Label: If It Moves...

Re-Constriction Records V/A chronology
Torture Tech Overdrive (1991)	The Cyberflesh Conspiracy (1992)

Alternative cover
- 1994 CD cover

Torture Tech Overdrive is a various artists compilation album released in 1991 by If It Moves.... In October 1994 the album was reissued for a limited run of 1000 pressings by Cleopatra Records with an extended track listing additional versions of tracks. The uncredited song is "Back in Black", an cover of the hard rock band AC/DC by Chase's musical outlet Rendering Service. The song "Lupe Velez" by Jimmy Jazz is about the illogicality of attempting to create a "beautiful suicide."

== Reception ==
Sonic Boom gave Torture Tech Overdrive a positive review and said "definitely a compilation to try and find regardless of its limited edition status."

== Track listing ==
Side one
No.	Title	Writer(s)	Artist	Length
1.	"Fight!"	Keith Arem, Jack Boughner	Biohazard PCB	3:49
2.	"Character Machine" (Reanimated Edit)	Anthony Floriano, Kenneth Spain, Stephen Synoski	Fixed Image	4:47
3.	"CDB" (Gizmo Edit)	R. Orret, Steve Watkins	Scar Tissue	3:41
4.	"Countdown to Meltdown '94" (Gate Edit)	Timothy Wiles	Death Method	4:28
5.	"Shallow Grave (Date With an Embalmer Mix)"	Chad Bishop, Allan King, Shayde Sartin	STG	4:21

Side two
No.	Title	Writer(s)	Artist	Length
1.	"Numbing Device" (1991 V. Remix)	Mark Deadrick, Trevor Henthorn	Sweat Engine	4:26
2.	"White Noise"	William Hayden, Keith York	Apolitiq	4:18
3.	"So Big (Original Un-Edited Mix)"	Peter Stone	Xorcist	5:05
4.	"Back in Black" (AC/DC cover)	Brian Johnson, Angus Young, Malcolm Young	Rendering Service	3:27
5.	"Freedom"	Jeremy Daw, Lynda Sterling	Yeht Mae	4:04

1994 CD track listing
No.	Title	Writer(s)	Artist	Length
1.	"Fight!"	Keith Arem, Jack Boughner	Biohazard PCB	3:49
2.	"Numbing Device"	Mark Deadrick, Trevor Henthorn	Sweat Engine	4:26
3.	"CDB" (Gizmo Edit)	R. Orret, Steve Watkins	Scar Tissue	3:41
4.	"Shallow Grave (Date With an Embalmer Mix)"	Chad Bishop, Allan King, Shayde Sartin	STG	4:21
5.	"White Noise"	William Hayden, Keith York	Apolitiq	4:18
6.	"Crock of Shit"	Shonn Bratlien, Barry Dost, Johan Sherriffs, Thomas Patrick Smith	Pain Emission	2:59
7.	"Character Machine"	Anthony Floriano, Kenneth Spain, Stephen Synoski	Fixed Image	4:47
8.	"Secret Hate"	Michael Gunn, Jeff Tatman	Death Industry	4:52
9.	"Manifesto Primitive"	Jeremy Goody	A Release Project	3:36
10.	"So Big (Original Un-Edited Mix)"	Peter Stone	Xorcist	5:05
11.	"Countdown to Meltdown '94"	Timothy Wiles	Death Method	4:28
12.	"Flesh Feeds Soul (Perversion '94)" (Razormaid Mix)	Steven Seibold	Hate Dept.	4:17
13.	"Freedom"	Jeremy Daw, Lynda Sterling	Yeht Mae	4:04
14.	"Technocality"	Mark Deadrick, Trevor Henthorn	Sweat Engine	5:01
15.	"Roundhouse"	Larry Rainwater	Ex-Voto	4:03
16.	"Glass" (Clean Mix)	James Basore, John Belew, Marc Phillips, Christian Void	Killing Floor	4:41
17.	"Lupe Velez"	Justin Hopkins	Jimmy Jazz	0:49
18.	"Back in Black" (AC/DC cover)	Brian Johnson, Angus Young, Malcolm Young	Rendering Service	3:27

== Personnel ==
Adapted from the Torture Tech Overdrive liner notes.

- Carol – compiling, design
- Chase – compiling
- Billy Peculiar – cover art

== Release history ==
Region	Date	Label	Format	Catalog
United States	1991	If It Moves...	LP	IIM-001
United States	1994	Cleopatra	CD	CLEO 9499
