= Optima (EP) =

EP by Christ Analogue
- Released: 1996
- Genre: Industrial rock
- Length: 46:24
- Label: Re-Constriction

Christ Analogue chronology
| The Texture ov Despise (1995) | Optima (1996) | In Radiant Decay (1997) |

Optima is an EP by Christ Analogue, released in 1996 by Re-Constriction Records. It was released in support of the band's second album In Radiant Decay and to promote remix material by Wade Alin, who had received attention for his club version of "Deep" by Collide.

== Track listing ==
All tracks are written by Wade Alin, Rey Guajardo and Markus Von Prause, except "Natural Born Killaz" by James Anderson, O'Shea Jackson and Andre Young.

| No. | Title | Remixer(s) | Length |
|---|---|---|---|
| 1. | "Optima (Organic)" (Clean Radio Edit) | | 4:19 |
| 2. | "This Shall Not Breathe (Oxygen)" (Extended Club Mix) | | 5:10 |
| 3. | "Cold Magnetic Sun" (Black Hole) | Statik | 4:32 |
| 4. | "Optima" (Synthetic) | Beyond Within | 6:55 |
| 5. | "Optima" (Digital) | Digital Shamen | 5:03 |
| 6. | "Optima" (Atomic) | Phobia | 5:58 |
| 7. | "Antibody" | | 3:53 |
| 8. | "Surface Like Nerve" (Violation) | Die Warzau | 6:24 |
| 9. | "Natural Born Killaz" (Dr. Dre & Ice Cube cover) | | 4:10 |

== Personnel ==
Adapted from the Optima liner notes.

Christ Analogue

- Wade Alin – instruments, assistant engineering (6)
- Rey Guajardo – instruments
- Sean Ivy – instruments
- Markus Von Prause – instruments

Additional musicians

- Tracy Moody – additional guitar

Production and design

- Immaculate – design

== Release history ==
| Region | Date | Label | Format | Catalog |
|---|---|---|---|---|
| United States | 1996 | Re-Constriction | CD | REC-028 |
