= The Cyberflesh Conspiracy =

Compilation album by Various artists
- Released: 1992
- Genre: Electro-industrial
- Length: 75:10
- Label: If It Moves...

Re-Constriction Records V/A chronology
Torture Tech Overdrive (1991)	The Cyberflesh Conspiracy (1992)	Assimilation (1993)

The Cyberflesh Conspiracy is a various artists compilation album released in 1992 by If It Moves.... The theme of the album is anti-ivory, as indicated by the display of an elephant killed for its tusks on the front cover.

== Track listing ==
No.	Title	Writer(s)	Artist	Length
1.	"Black Radio (In the Neon Blur)"	Jared Hendrickson, Joe Frank, Dylan Thomas Moore	Chemlab	3:43
2.	"Brutal Rapture"	Gary Dassing	Mentallo & The Fixer	5:04
3.	"Needle Park"	Marc Jameson, Kevin Marburg, Vince Montalbano, Pat Toves	Diatribe	5:19
4.	"Mindfuck"	Dan Gatto	Babyland	3:05
5.	"Burial at Sea"	Daniel Vahnke	Vampire Rodents	4:26
6.	"Violent Mood Swings"	Jim Sellers	Stabbing Westward	6:19
7.	"Merciful Release"	Dave Creadeau	Watchmen	4:38
8.	"Squirm"	Travis Crocker	The Bleeding Stone	4:58
9.	"El Topo" (Remix)	Arthur Woznik, John Zewizz	Sleep Chamber	4:09
10.	"Harbinger of Death"	Michael Lauter	Creeping Eruption	4:34
11.	"Man Mind Machine"	Jeff Foster	We of Sound Mind	4:14
12.	"Motorskills"	Joel Bornzin, Jon Fell, Eric Powell, Jeff Taylor	16volt	5:25
13.	"Bimbo"	Shonn Bratlien, Thomas Smith	Pain Emission	3:37
14.	"No Tears"	Mike Castle	Red Red Groove	5:03
15.	"Man Is the Animal"	Alex Kane	Teknition	4:54
16.	"Brain Dead"	Steve Lenos	U.T.O.	5:42

== Personnel ==
Adapted from The Cyberflesh Conspiracy liner notes.

- Chase – compiling
- Trevor Henthorn – mastering
- Paulkun Noy – cover art

== Release history ==
Region	Date	Label	Format	Catalog
United States	1992	If It Moves...	CD	IIM-002
