= Desipramine (album) =

Studio album by Waiting for God
- Released: 1997
- Studio: NAL Studios (Vancouver, BC)
- Genre: Electro-industrial
- Length: 41:47
- Label: Synthetic Symphony
- Producer: Martin Myers; Greg Price

Waiting for God chronology
Waiting for God (1994)	Desipramine (1997)

Desipramine is the second studio album by Waiting for God, released in 1997 by Synthetic Symphony.

== Reception ==
Aiding & Abetting gave Desipramine a positive review, calling it "much edgier sound than the first album" and saying "the change in sophistication and general adventurousness is impressive." Larry Dean Miles at Black Monday was somewhat critical of the album, saying "there are no hooks, the vocals are grating, and the rhythms are erratic in their pulsating monotony" but "the female vocal arrangements of Daemon Cadman are the saving grace to the monotony of Waiting for God's" Sonic Boom praised the band for being able "to push the envelope of their own music by incorporating noise concepts into their already unique pseudo-Darkwave style ultimately yielding another new hybrid sound."

== Track listing ==
All tracks are written by Daemon Cadman, Martin Myers and Greg Price

No.	Title	Length
1.	"Desipramine"	3:20
2.	"Inefficient Machine"	4:57
3.	"Trust in Me"	3:59
4.	"Tragic Cinderella"	3:23
5.	"Bitch"	4:29
6.	"Untitled"	4:32
7.	"Positive I.D."	3:42
8.	"Denial"	3:42
9.	"Inefficient Machine"	4:55
10.	"Guilt"	4:47

== Personnel ==
Adapted from the Desipramine liner notes.

Waiting for God

- Daemon Cadman – lead vocals
- Martin Myers – guitar, keyboards, programming, production, mixing, editing (1, 9, 10)
- Greg Price – drums, production, mixing (1, 9, 10), editing

Additional performers

- Michael Balch – sampler (4)
- Bill Briscall – bass guitar (9)
- Jay Byiak – guitar (2, 3, 5)
- Eric Chalmers – guitar (1, 2, 5)

Production and design

- Ken Marshall – mixing (2–8)

== Release history ==
Region	Date	Label	Format	Catalog
1997	Germany	Synthetic Symphony	CD	SPV 085-61582
1998	United States	Re-Constriction	CD	REC-040
