= Diatribe (album) =

Studio album by Diatribe
- Released: November 3, 1996
- Studio: The Sonic Skateboards Studio
- Genre: Industrial rock
- Length: 46:46
- Label: Cargo/Re-Constriction
- Producer: Marc Jameson

Diatribe chronology
Nothing (1992)	Diatribe (1996)

Diatribe is the debut studio album by American industrial rock band Diatribe, released on November 3, 1996, by Cargo and Re-Constriction Records. The album features tracks dating back to 1992, with most of the tracks being produced around 1995.

== Reception ==
Aiding & Abetting called Diatribe "a solid effort that connects on every level" and that "the power is palpable in every track." Sonic Boom gave Diatribe a positive review, saying the "album has the potential, if marketed right, to blow the lid off the entire crossover industrial scene. All of the elements are present; ballads, club tracks, industrial rock staples, and a lyricist who can sound like Sting one minute and Daniel Ash the next." Scott Hefflon of Lollipop Magazine agreed, saying "combining the singable vocal lines of typical rock music with the fat guitars of metal and the flexibility of looping percussion, surreal sound slicing, and slick keyboards, Diatribe offers a fresh, accessible variation of rock, without losing sight of the fact that they are, first and foremost, an electronics-based band." Option described the album as a "harsh, yet accessible mesh of guitars, complex electronics, organic & programmed percussion, with Marc J.'s indelible vocals."

== Track listing ==
No.	Title	Lyrics	Music	Length
1.	"Sick the Dogs"	Marc Jameson	Marc Jameson; Pat Toves	4:20
2.	"Junkyard"	Jameson	Phil Biagini; Jameson	5:01
3.	"Four Fifty One"	Jameson	Biagini; Jameson	4:40
4.	"Land's End"	Jameson	Jameson; Toves	5:16
5.	"Another Time"	Jameson	Biagini; Jameson	4:15
6.	"The Son"	Jameson; Kevin Marburg	Jameson; Toves	3:38
7.	"Web"	Jameson	Biagini; Jameson	4:04
8.	"Sister"	Jameson	Jameson	4:26
9.	"The Other Side"	Jameson; Marburg	Jameson	4:27
10.	"Freaks"	Jameson; Marburg	Jameson; Toves	6:40

== Personnel ==
Adapted from the Diatribe liner notes.

Diatribe

- Phil Biagini – guitar on tracks: 2, 3, 5, 7
- Marc Jameson – lead vocals, keyboards, drums, programming, production, engineering
- Kevin Marburg – bass guitar, sampler, cover art, design
- Pat Toves – guitar on tracks: 1, 4, 6, 10

Production and design

- Mike Bogus – engineering
- Jacqueline Gallier – additional vocals (3)
- Scott Gorham – mastering
- Daniel Jameson – engineering (6)
- Josquin des Pres – mastering

== Release history ==
Region	Date	Label	Format	Catalog
United States	1996	Cargo	CD	723248 40522 1
United States	1996	Re-Constriction Records	CD, CS	REC-007
