= Shut Up Kitty: A Cyber-Based Covers Compilation =

Compilation album by Various artists
- Released: November 5, 1993
- Genre: Industrial rock, electro-industrial
- Length: 68:07
- Label: Re-Constriction

Re-Constriction Records V/A chronology
| Ripped Up and So Sedated (1993) | Shut Up Kitty: A Cyber-Based Covers Compilation (1993) | Scavengers in the Matrix (1994) |

Shut Up Kitty: A Cyber-Based Covers Compilation is a various artists compilation album released on November 5, 1993, by Re-Constriction Records.

== Reception ==
Aiding & Abetting gave Shut Up Kitty: A Cyber-Based Covers Compilation a somewhat positive review, saying "a lot of this is pretty cool, especially when songs are just completely deconstructed" while criticizing some lackluster material.

== Track listing ==
| No. | Title | Writer(s) | Artist | Length |
|---|---|---|---|---|
| 1. | "Mysterious Ways" (U2 cover) | Bono, Adam Clayton, The Edge, Larry Mullen Jr. | KMFDM | 3:09 |
| 2. | "Coldsweat" (Sugarcubes cover) | Sigtryggur Baldursson, Einar Örn Benediktsson, Þór Eldon, Björk Guðmundsdóttir, Bragi Ólafsson | Diatribe | 3:49 |
| 3. | "Sympathy for the Devil" (Rolling Stones cover) | Mick Jagger, Keith Richards | Skrew | 4:31 |
| 4. | "White Rabbit" (Jefferson Airplane cover) | Grace Slick | Death Method | 3:14 |
| 5. | "Obsession" (Animotion cover) | Michael Des Barres, Holly Knight | Blue Eyed Christ | 3:54 |
| 6. | "Smells Like Teen Spirit" (Nirvana cover) | Kurt Cobain, Dave Grohl, Krist Novoselic | Xorcist | 5:02 |
| 7. | "Paranoid" (Black Sabbath cover) | Geezer Butler, Tony Iommi, Ozzy Osbourne, Bill Ward | The Clay People | 3:36 |
| 8. | "Vogue" (Madonna cover) | Madonna, Shep Pettibone | D.D.T. | 4:51 |
| 9. | "Freedom of Choice" (Devo cover) | Mark Mothersbaugh, Gerald Casale | 16Volt | 3:23 |
| 10. | "She Watch Channel Zero?!" (Public Enemy cover) | William Drayton, Richard Griffin, Carlton Ridenhour, Eric Sadler, Hank Shocklee | Apolitiq | 3:38 |
| 11. | "Boy" (Book of Love cover) | Ted Ottaviano, Lauren Roselli | Non-Aggression Pact | 4:51 |
| 12. | "Burning Up" (Madonna cover) | Madonna | Babyland | 3:35 |
| 13. | "Stand and Deliver" (Adam and the Ants cover) | Adam Ant, Marco Pirroni | Society Burning | 5:03 |
| 14. | "Good Vibrations" (Beach Boys cover) | Mike Love, Brian Wilson | Fleshhouse | 5:00 |
| 15. | "In-A-Gadda-Da-Vida" (Iron Butterfly cover) | Doug Ingle | Martyr Colony | 3:24 |
| 16. | "Order of Death" (Public Image Ltd cover) | Martin Atkins, Keith Levene, John Lydon | Virus 23 | 5:17 |
| 17. | "[untitled]" | | | 1:50 |

== Personnel ==
Adapted from the Shut Up Kitty: A Cyber-Based Covers Compilation liner notes.

- Chase – compiling, design
- Jim Woodring – cover art

== Release history ==
| Region | Date | Label | Format | Catalog |
|---|---|---|---|---|
| United States | 1993 | Re-Constriction | CD | REC-009 |
