= Diatribe (band) =

American industrial rock band

- Origin: San Jose, California, U.S.
- Genre: Industrial rock
- Years active: 1990–1997
- Labels: Cargo; COP Intl.; Eight One Nine; Re-Constriction
- Past members: Phil Biagini; Marc Jameson; Kevin Marburg; Dennis Morehouse; Vince Montalbano; Pat Toves
- Website: marcjameson

Diatribe was an American industrial rock group from San Jose, California, active in the 1990s. They had a sound similar to 16 Volt and Chemlab, integrating synthesizers and vocal samples with more traditional rock instruments. The band's full-length debut Diatribe was released by Cargo Music and Re-Constriction Records on November 3, 1996.

== History ==
Diatribe was formed in San Jose, California, by vocalist/keyboardist Marc Jameson, bassist Kevin Marburg and guitarists Vince Montalbano and Pat Toves. They recorded "Cockeyed Motherfucker" in 1990 and released the song on two various artists compilations, A Reason for Living by Santa Cruz Skateboards and From the Machine by Index Productions. The band debuted with the EP Therapy for Eight One Nine Productions. The EP's title track was later used in the 1995 film Strange Days but did not appear on the official soundtrack album. The music came to the attention of Christian Petke, vocalist and founding member of Deathline International, who decided to reissue Diatribe's debut and utilize them with Battery as premier band's for his label COP International.

Diatribe came to attention of Re-Constriction Records owner Chase, who adopted the band onto his roster and released Nothing in 1992. The EP contained the songs "Kingpin" and "Nothing", which became staples for the band. Guitarist Montalbano parted ways with the band after the Nothing's release and his position was filled by Phil Biagini. In 1994 the band fell under the management of Lawrence Christopher and participated with KMFDM and Sister Machine Gun on the Angstfest tour, where they premiered the song "Sick the Dogs". The band began incorporating electronic music into their guitar oriented sound. The band finished recording a demo in 1995, which included the songs "Another Time", "Freaks", "New Breed", "The Son", "Web" and "World on Fire". The following year they released Diatribe for Re-Constriction Records. The band released the single Ultracide with "Junkyard" as a B-side. With Marc Jameson having his interests diverted to breakbeat, drum and bass, downtempo and trip hop, the Diatribe's artistic direction splintered and they decided to disband.

== Discography ==
Studio albums

- Diatribe (1996, Re-Constriction)

Extended plays

- Therapy (1991, Eight One Nine)
- Nothing (1992, Re-Constriction)

Singles

- Ultracide (1996, Re-Constriction)

Compilation appearances

- A Reason for Living (1990, Santa Cruz Skateboards)
- From the Machine (1990, Index)
- Assimilation (1992, Metal Blade)
- California Cyber Crash Compilation (1992, COP International)
- The Cyberflesh Conspiracy (1992, If It Moves...)
- Funky Alternatives Seven (1993, Concrete)
- Shut Up Kitty: A Cyber-Based Covers Compilation (1993, Re-Constriction)
- Crowbar America (1994, Re-Constriction)
- Live 105 10 Year Anniversary: 1986-1996 (1994)
- Re-Constriction 10* Year Anniversary (1996, Re-Constriction)
- Industrial War: The Agony and the Ecstasy of Industrial Music (1997, Shanachie)
- Awake the Machines - On the Line Vol. 2 (1997, Out Of Line)
- Got Moose? Re-Constriction CD Sampler#2 (1997, Re-Constriction)
- Industrial Virus (1997, Dressed To Kill)
- Industrial War: The Agony And Ecstasy Of Industrial Music (1997, Shanachie)
- Industrial Hazard (1998, Dressed To Kill)
- Machines And Noise (Volume 3) (2002, Mastertech)
