= Purr Machine =

American electro-industrial band

- Origin: North Hollywood, California, United States
- Genres: Electro-industrial
- Years active: 1996–present
- Label: Re-Constriction
- Past members: Kirk Hellie; Kevin Kipnis; Betsy Martin
- Website: purrmachine.com

Purr Machine are an American electro-industrial group based in Los Angeles, California, and comprising guitarist Kirk Hellie, bassist Kevin Kipnis and vocalist Betsy Martin. They band were known for their atmospheric blend of electronica, gothic music and industrial rock. With Kevin Kipnis serving as their main songwriter and programmer, Purr Machine released Speak Clearly and Ging Ging respectively in 1999 and 2000 for Re-Constriction Records. Purr Machine's second studio album Starry was released in 2007 by No Bliss Lost Records.

== History ==
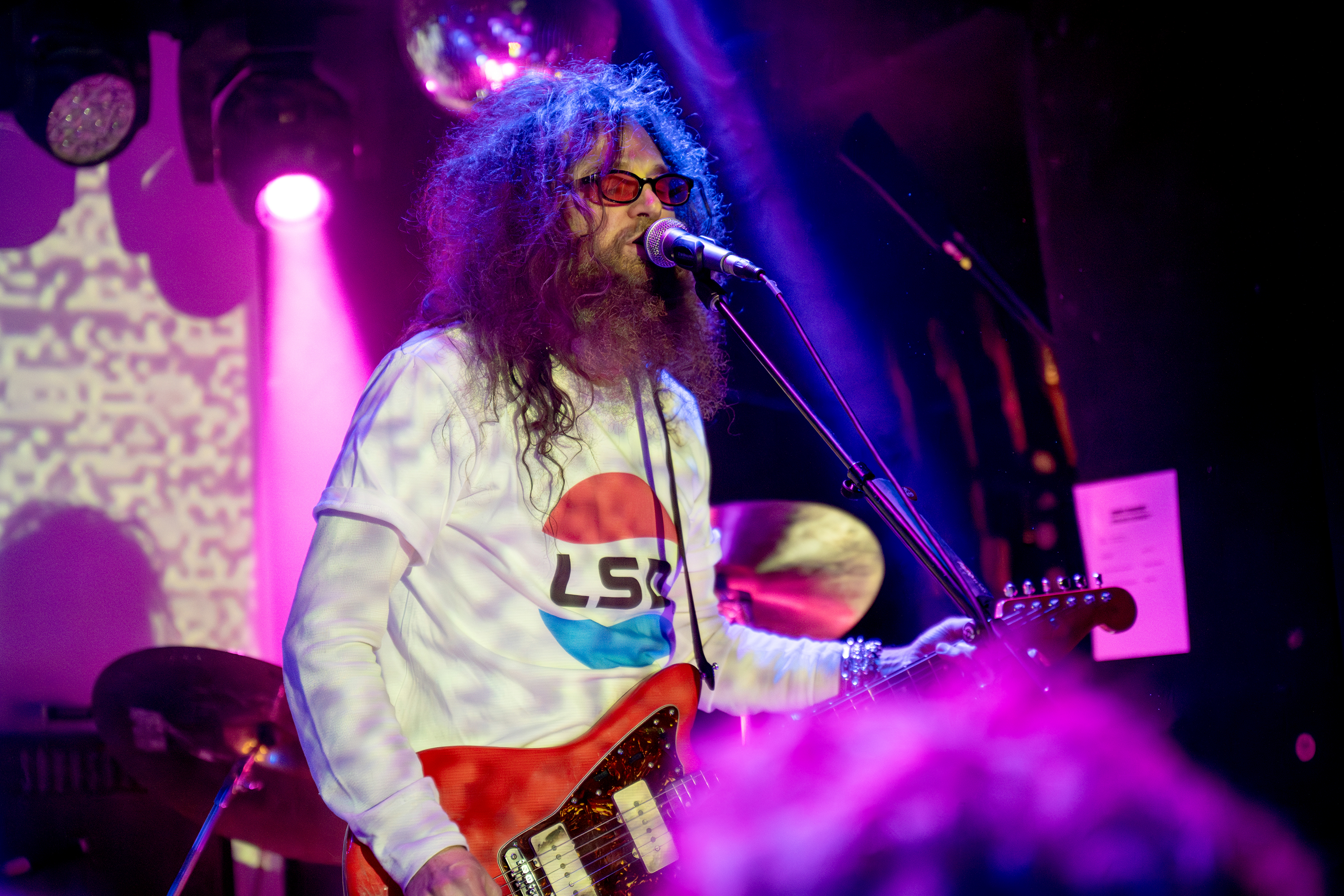
Kirk Hellie (2024)

Purr Machine was formed in 1996 North Hollywood by bassist Kevin Kipnis and vocalist Betsy Martin, both of whom were recording as a duo under the name Kore. The idea for the band name Purr Machine was conceived by Betsy Martin in relation to her obsession with cats. Previously Betsy Martin had been in the Phoenix-based band Caterwaul and later Drumatic, while Kevin Kipnis was recognized for his work with the seminal death rock group Kommunity FK. Guitarist Kirk Hellie of Pink Noise Test later joined the duo to record the EP Speak Clearly for Re-Constriction Records, which contained "Girl, You'll Be a Woman Soon" from the Cyberpunk Fiction: A Synthcore "Soundtrack" with three original tracks. The band's debut studio album Ging Ging was released in 2000 and was praised for its "combination of heavy metal aggression fused with electronica soundscapes" and "moments of beauty."

After a seven-year hiatus, Purr Machine released their second full-length album Starry on No Bliss Lost Records in 2007. The band collaborated with several artists on the release, including Chris Vrenna of Nine Inch Nails, William Faith of Faith and the Muse and Statik from Collide. In 2015 Kevin Kipnis was asked to perform bass and guitar for the band Silver Ghost Shimmer fronted by John Fryer, who later collaborated with Betsy Martin on the track "Dead Star" from Black Needle Noise's 2017 album Before the Tears Came. A third Purr Machine album is in production and planned for release in 2020.

== Discography ==
Studio albums

- Ging Ging (2000, Re-Constriction)
- Starry (2007, No Bliss Lost)

EPs

- Speak Clearly (1999, Re-Constriction)
