= Waiting for God (band) =

Canadian goth-industrial band

- Origin: Vancouver, British Columbia, Canada
- Genres: Goth-industrial
- Years active: 1994–1997
- Label: Re-Constriction
- Past members: Daemon Cadman; Steven Fairweather; Martin Myers; Greg Price

Waiting for God was a Canadian goth-industrial band from Vancouver, British Columbia, Canada, who recorded from 1994 to 1997. The band consisted of Daemon Cadman, Martin Myers, Greg Price and Steven Fairweather; lead singer Cadman's lyrics were often about her murdered brother, Jesse Cadman. Waiting For God released two albums, Quarter Inch Thick and Desipramine, before breaking up.

== Etymology ==
The members of Waiting For God have given different answers in different interviews about the origin of the band's name.

Apocalypse magazine interview:
Apocalypse: Where did you get the name Waiting For God?
Daemon: You must realize that no matter what we say, we could by lying......
Martin: I don't remember. The first EP was finished and one of us, Daemon or I, just came up with it. Sorry if that's a bit of a boring answer. If someone has a more interesting one maybe they can send it to me?

Ink 19 interview:
We agreed to be 50/50 partners, and use other musicians live. We 'borrowed' the name Waiting For God from an episode of Red Dwarf . I had to fight and tooth and nail to keep that band name, as Martin wanted to get rid of it. Funny, years go by and now he can't part with the name...

Trashcan Bangin Culture interview:
Trash: How did you come up with your name?
Martin: I don't know man, that was Daemon's doing. When we finished the "Rapture" EP we didn't even have a band name yet. I think Daemon pulled that one out of a hat. There is no story behind the name.

Chaotic Critiques interview:
[The interviewer] questioned Greg about the meaning behind the band name, and whether it has any connection to some of the religious millenarian movements that are arising in anticipation of the turn of the century. Greg feels that "the name 'WAITING FOR GOD' doesn't really hold any deep meaning to us, it's just a name we decided upon." Elaborating further, Greg recalls that "it came to us after watching the movie The Rapture. In the movie, a woman takes her daughter out to the desert to wait for Jesus to return. After waiting, she decides to send her daughter off (thinking God told her to) to Heaven early by killing her. By doing this, the mother loses faith, and when Jesus returns she refuses to go off to Heaven because of her hatred towards God for what she believed he made her do....It seems too many people wait for God. The second coming seems to be the 21st century buzz word...people actually waiting around to find out baffles me. Objectively, I'm going to have to say 'I'm going to make the most of my life.'"

== Discography ==
- Waiting for God (KMG, 1994)
- Desipramine (Synthetic Symphony, 1997)

== Trivia ==
Daemon is the daughter of Chuck Cadman, who fought for victim's rights after the murder of Jesse Cadman.

== See also ==
- Music of Canada
- Music of Vancouver
- Canadian rock
- List of Canadian musicians
- List of bands from Canada
- List of bands from British Columbia
- Category:Canadian musical groups
