= Apparatus (band) =

Electro-industrial band

- Origin: Charlotte, North Carolina, US
- Genres: Electro-industrial
- Years active: 1993–1996
- Label: Re-Constriction
- Spinoffs: Liquid Sex Decay
- Past members: Blake Barnes; Scott Morgan; David York

Apparatus was an electro-industrial band based in Charlotte, North Carolina. The trio comprised vocalist Blake Barnes, guitarist Scott Morgan (as Sid) and keyboardist David York (as D. York). They released a sole full-length self-titled album in 1995 before disbanding.

== History ==
Apparatus was formed in Charlotte, North Carolina, by Blake Barnes, David York, and Scott Morgan. Their melding of guitar, electronics and hip hop beats earned them comparisons to Nine Inch Nails and KMFDM. The band caught the attention of Re-Constriction Records and were signed in 1995.

The band released their self-titled debut album in 1995. "Hell's Home" and "Slave Or Prayer" were made in collaboration with industrial rock producer Lee Popa. Aiding & Abetting praised the band for their aggressive sound, saying the band "has put together a wild ride that massages both the club folks and metal freaks." Music videos were filmed for the songs "Come Alive" and "Hell's Home". The trio disbanded shortly after the release of the album, with D. York and Sid forming the dark ambient project Liquid Sex Decay in 1997.

== Discography ==
Studio albums

- Apparatus (Re-Constriction, 1995)
