= Non-Aggression Pact (band) =

American electro-industrial band

Non-aggression Pact
- Origin: Tampa, Florida, United States
- Genres: Electro-industrial
- Years active: 1990–2001
- Labels: Re-Constriction; Cleopatra; Simbiose; GPC Productions
- Members: Jeff Hillard; Jason Whitcomb
- Past members: Dan Bates; Matthew Marzolf

Non-Aggression Pact (abbv. as N.A.P.) was an urban-electro-industrial music group from Tampa, Florida formed by Jeff Hillard and Jason Whitcomb. Their music featured an abrasive industrial-dance sound, with funky, grind-hop drum loops overlain by harsh vocals and thought-provoking audio samples from various movies and documentaries. Their lyrics focused mostly on the issues of racism and mass media.

== History ==
Jeff Hillard and Jason Whitcomb met during high school in Tampa, Florida. After graduating, Whitcomb and his friend Dan Bates began working on music and asked Hillard to join. The trio played in several live-only incarnations before distilling into Non-Aggression Pact with Hillard as keyboardist/drummer, Whitcomb as keyboardist/vocalist, and additional support on bass and piano from Bates.

At the time, Hillard was also a DJ at a local alternative music club where a fellow DJ encouraged him to contact Chase, who was working at the time with Cargo Records, in the interest of securing a deal for the band. Chase passed the reference to Alex Kane who had recently started his General Purpose Cassettes (G.P.C.) label. Two cassettes worth of material from the band were released by GPC as split cassettes in 1991 and 1992 with Mentallo and the Fixer and Xorcist, respectively. In 1993, GPC released the band's first full album, Gesticulate, which was the first CD release by the label. The electronic music was composed and sequenced with an Ensoniq EPS 16+ digital sampler. Additional sounds were taken from a Roland Juno-106 analog synthesizer.

The G.P.C. label usually sold merchandise with unusual packaging, as such, the Gesticulate CD was a limited-edition release with an aluminum foil cover and screen-printed artwork. The cassette tape version was sold in a metal can. There were two different versions of the CD cover printed.

The band's second release was 9mm Grudge in 1994 on Chase's Re-Constriction label. It was more guitar driven, however much of it was sampled including a riff from Van Halen appearing in a song.

Five years later, Broadcast-Quality Belligerence was released. This marked a change in production with a shift to PC based recording software instead of their previous "Live Take" approach via DAT. This also appears to be the band's final commercial release. Newer material was released on their MP3.com page until the site changed formats.

== Discography ==
- Non-Aggression Pact — Cass, EP 1990 – Retroflex Records
- .5 Honkey/Wreckage + Ruin + & + Regrets + [Redemption] – Cass 1991, all Side A tracks (with Side B feat. Mentallo and the Fixer) – GPC Productions
- Repossessed/Non-Aggression Pact – 2xCass 1992, all cassette #1 (with cassette #2 feat. Xorcist) – GPC Productions
- Gesticulate – CD Album 1992 – GPC Productions
- 9mm Grudge – CD Album 1994 – Re-constriction Records
- Spent Casings: Gesticulate Reloaded - CD Album 1995 – 24 Hr. Service Station/IODA
- Broadcast-Quality Belligerence – CD Album 1998 – Re-constriction Records

== Compilation appearances ==
- "Gárgula Mecânica" World Electrostatic Assembly – CD 1992, track #4 "The Debriefing" - Simbiose Records
- Death Rave 2000 – CD 1993, track #6 "Holy Babel (Receptor Mix)" and track #9 "Razor" - 21st Circuity
- Grid Slinger – LP 1993, side B, track #2 "Powder Keg", and side B, track #4 "Der Angriff" - Re-constriction Records, Cleopatra
- Rivet Head Culture – CD 1993, track #1 "Wicked Painted Sun" - If It Moves...
- Shut Up Kitty: A Cyber-Based Covers Compilation – CD 1993, track #11 "Boy (1 Bullet mix)" - Re-constriction Records
- Chambermade – Cass 1995, side B, track #3 "Blown Livid" - Re-constriction Records
- Frostbyte – Cass 1995, side A, track 5 "Wicked Painted Sun" and side B, track #5 "Flask Edit" - Re-constriction Records
- 21st Circuitry Shox – CD 1996, track #13 "Razor" - 21st Circuitry
- Built for Stomping – CD Promo Sampler 1996, track #16 "Bleeding Messiah" - Re-constriction Records, Cleopatra
- Re-Constriction 10* Year Anniversary – CD Promo 1998, track #10 "Blown Livid" - Re-constriction Records
- Cyberpunk Fiction – CD 1998, track #14 "Flowers on the Wall" - Re-constriction Records
- Black Sunshine: The Tampa Underground & Beyond – 2xCD 2002, disc 1, track #5 "Celtic Frog" and disc 2, track #4 "I Know Your Crimes" - Cleopatra
