= Christ Analogue =

American industrial rock band

- Origin: Seattle, Washington, U.S.
- Genres: Electronic, industrial rock
- Years active: 1995–1998; 2003–2004
- Labels: Architecture, Flagrant, Manifest, Re-Constriction
- Members: Wade Alin
- Past members: Rey Guajardo; Sean Ivy; Tracy Moody; Markus Von Prause
- Website: christanalogue.com

Christ Analogue was an American industrial rock group started in 1995 by frontman and producer Wade Alin.

== History ==
Christ Analogue was devised in 1995 by programmer/vocalist Wade Alin. After Markus Von Prause joined on guitar, the duo debuted with the single "This Shall Not Breathe" in 1994 and was compared favorably to Sister Machine Gun. The 1996 release of their debut album, The Texture ov Despise, earned Christ Analogue instant respect in the electronic/industrial music scene. For an electronic-based act, they approached their live performances with an unusually aggressive, and often destructive punk ethic. This exciting live act helped them develop a strong following in the Seattle, WA, and Vancouver, BC, areas.

In an effort to gain national recognition, the band booked and headlined their own tours of the United States. Christ Analogue did five national tours within two years, including shows with Sheep on Drugs, 16 Volt, Electric Hellfire Club, Stabbing Westward, Insight 23, and two appearances at the CMJ Musicfest.

After signing to MCA/Cargo/Re-Constriction, Christ Analogue self-produced their second album, In Radiant Decay. Critically acclaimed by both the commercial and underground press, In Radiant Decay made an impact both in clubs and on college radio throughout the US.

Despite these successes, Wade Alin's relocation to New York coupled with the collapse of Re-Constriction Records caused the band's dissolution. However, Alin continued to apply the Christ Analogue name to various remixes, and remains a sought-after producer.

Five years after their apparent departure, Christ Analogue reemerged with the album Everyday Is Distortion in 2003.

In April 2012 Wade Alin created and had successfully funded a Kickstarter project to re-create In Radiant Decay from a combination of the original recordings and new material.

On 8 November 2023, former guitarist Tracy Moody died.

== Discography ==
Studio albums

- The Texture ov Despise (1995, Manifest)
- In Radiant Decay (1997, Re-Constriction)
- Everyday Is Distortion (2003, Flagrant)
- The Bitcrusher Remixes (2004, Architecture)

EPs

- Optima (1996, Re-Constriction)

Singles

- "This Shall Not Breathe" (1994, Manifest)

Tracks appear on

- Operation Beatbox (1996, Re-Constriction Records) -- "Natural Born Killaz"
- Re-Constriction 10* Year Anniversary (1996, Re-Constriction Records) -- "Optima"
- Awake The Machines – On The Line Vol. 2 (1997, Out Of Line, Sub/Mission Records) -- "Optima (Organic Radio)"
- Got Moose? Re-Constriction CD Sampler #2 (1997, Re-Constriction Records) -- "Cold Magnetic Sun"
- TV Terror: Felching A Dead Horse (1997, Re-Constriction Records) -- "Happy Days"
- Apocalypse Now Vol. 2 (1998, Sub Terranean) -- "Optima (Digital)"
- Cyberpunk Fiction (1998, Re-Constriction Records) -- "Let's Stay Together"
- Songs From The Wasteland (A Tribute To The Mission) (1998, Re-Constriction Records) -- "Garden of Delight"
- Sounds From The Asylum 1 (1998, Base Asylum) -- "Wear"
- Komposi002 (2003, Positron! Records) -- "So Brand New"
- Electronic Saviors: Industrial Music To Cure Cancer (2010, Metropolis Records) -- "The Fight"

Remixes

- Collide—Deep (Christ Analogue Remix) (1996)
- Killing Floor—Wood (Christ Analogue Remix) (1997)
- Waiting for God—2 Extremes (PolyGod Mix) (2000)
- Acumen Nation—Just A Bastard (Fatherless Mix) (2002)
- VooDou—Dogfight (Doberman Mix) (2002)
- Idiot Stare—Ghost (Bufferfuck Mix) (2003)
- Sister Machine Gun—To Hell With You (Christ Analogue Remix) (2003)
- PTI—IDentify (Christ Analogue Putrefaction) (2004)
- Cylab—Maze (Christ Analogue Remix) (2004)
- Collide—Razor Sharp (Dull Mix) (2004)
- Collide—Inside (External Mix) (2004)
- Chemlab—Scornocopia (Glitchstar Mix) (2006)
- CEOXiME—Stop In Your Tracks (Christ Analogue Remix) (2006)
