= Marc Jameson =

American record producer

- Also known as: Marc Jay, Marc J
- Born: Los Angeles, California
- Genres: Pop, rock, alternative, electro, drum and bass, industrial rock, coldwave, trip hop
- Occupations: Record producer, programmer, remixer
- Instruments: Drums, keyboards, vocals

Marc Jameson is an American former record producer, audio engineer, programmer, writer, and remixer. He began his career as an artist, in bands such as Kikiwest and The Distnce. Prior to his production work, he was the lead singer and keyboardist of the industrial rock band Diatribe. His credits include Christina Aguilera, Madonna, Kelly Osbourne, Matt & Kim, Static-X, Bon Jovi, and more.

== Discography ==
=== Records ===
- The Distnce – Dry Land
- Christina Aguilera – Keeps Gettin' Better: A Decade of Hits
- Static-X – Cult of Static
- Boh Runga – "Names in the Sand"
- Christina Aguilera – Back to Basics
- Christina Aguilera – "Da Da Da", Pepsi
- Sierra Swan – LadyLand
- Kelly Osbourne – "Secret Lover"
- Madonna – "American Life" (Felix Da Housecat's Devin Dazzle Club Mix)
- Bon Jovi – Bounce
- Lizzie West – Holy Road: Freedom Songs
- Lizzie West – Lizzie West EP
- Felix da Housecat – "Rocket Ride"
- Shannon Curfman – Fast Lane Addiction
- Mighty Six Ninety – Cheers to the Bitter End
- Mighty Six Ninety – Cheers to the Bitter End [Bonus Tracks]

=== Film ===
- Le Reve de la Mere – Original score
- Secretary – "Chariots Rise", Lizzie West.
- Strange Days – "Therapy".
- Saving Emily – "Twilight", Jayspex.

=== Television ===
- Miss Match – "Feel Better", Kikiwest.
- MTV Road Rules – "Creeper", Kikiwest
- Battle of the Sexes – "Creeper", Kikiwest.

=== Video games ===
- Bloody Roar 2

== Band origins ==
=== Kikiwest ===
Marc Jameson and Jacqueline Gallier formed Kikiwest in the late 1990s. A trip hop duo influenced by bands like Portishead, Kikiwest found initial success by sending out four demos to four different record companies and receiving offers from every one of them. Jameson and Gallier chose to sign with London/FFRR, and although the future looked bright for Kikiwest, the relationship fell apart before an album was released. Kikiwest has only had one official major release: "Creeper" on She – A Female Trip-Hop Experience (2001) compilation. They continue to release independent recording of their official MySpace website.

Kikiwest discography

- Kikiwest – She: A Female Triphop Experience
- Kikiwest – Chilled Sirens
- Kikiwest – Definitive Chilled
