= Tinfed =

American rock band

- Origin: Sacramento, California, US
- Genres: Alternative rock
- Years active: 1992–2003
- Labels: Hollywood, Primitech, Re-Constriction
- Past members: Nick Frederick; Giovanni Mercado; Matt McCord; Rey Osburn; Eric Stenman; Rick Verrett; Eddie Jorgensen

Tinfed was an American alternative rock group started in Sacramento, California. The final line-up consisted of vocalist and instrumentalist Rey Osburn, guitarist Eric Stenman, drummer Matt McCord, and bassist Rick Verrett. They released three studio albums: Synaptic Hardware (1993), Hypersonic Hyperphonic (1996) and Tried + True (2000).

== History ==
=== Early years and indie releases (1992–2000) ===
Tinfed was founded in Sacramento, California by Rey Osburn and Eric Stenman. Stenman and Osburn had previously performed together in the band Elegy, who had only released a 7" titled Dormant / Separated in 1990. Similar to that project, Tinfed's sound was heavily influenced by punk rock, industrial rock, and indie rock. The band released their debut, titled Synaptic Hardware, in 1993 on Primitech Releases. Mercado left the band shortly after the release and the band expanded to include bassist Nick Frederick and drummer/percussionist Matt McCord, the latter of whom had also been a former member of Elegy. Their second album was issued by electro-industrial label Re-Constriction Records on December 3, 1996 and was titled Hypersonic Hyperphonic. Sonic Boom noted that "Tinfed is one of those bands who would fit perfectly on tour with the likes of God Lives Underwater, Stabbing Westward, Filter & Gravity Kills which means they should do rather well with the current crossover audience." In 2000, their song "Immune" was featured in the film Mission: Impossible 2 and appeared on its soundtrack.

=== Major label years and break-up (2000–2003) ===
The band signed to Third Rail Records who were distributed by Hollywood Records and just before, replaced Nick Frederick with Rick Verrett. Tinfed released their major-label debut Tried + True on August 22, 2000. Stanton Swihart of Allmusic gave the album a mixed review and criticized the band for sounding too derivative of Britpop groups such as Radiohead and Travis, saying "they ultimately fail to attain the same levels of esoteric complexity as those bands." Swihart concluded his review saying the band's best material may be ahead of them: "While Tinfed is not unequivocally successful or innovative on a sonic level, it is frequently exciting and a terribly promising effort from a band that may eventually cast its own considerable shadow." CMJ reviewed it more positively, calling Tried + True a "forward-thinking rock record with plenty of potential commercial appeal" that "contains pretty guitar pop enhanced only minimally by studio machinery."

On March 4, 2003 the band released Designated Rivals, an album containing remixed and several previously unreleased tracks, on Attinuator Records. In July the members of Tinfed announced they had decided to turn their attention to separate projects, effectively ending the band. Rey Osburn formed the two bands Ghostride and Death Valley High, with Matt McCord also joining Death Valley High along with Osburn. Rick Verrett had joined Team Sleep in 2001 and appeared on their self-titled debut in 2005. Eric Stenman continued building his resume as a producer and recording engineer, working with bands such as AWOLNATION, Saves The Day, Will Haven, Senses Fail and Thrice.

== Band members ==
Final line-up

- Matt McCord – drums (1996–2003)
- Rey Osburn – vocals and guitar (1992–2003)
- Eric Stenman – guitar (1992–2003) and bass guitar (1992–1996, 2000–2003)
- Rick Verrett – bass guitar (2000–2003)

Former members

- Nick Frederick – bass guitar (1996–2000)
- Eddie Jorgensen – drums (1991)
- Giovanni Mercado – drums (1992–1996)

Timeline

== Discography ==
Studio albums

- Synaptic Hardware (Primitech, 1993)
- Hypersonic Hyperphonic (Re-Constriction, 1996)
- Tried + True (Hollywood, 2000)

Remix albums

- Designated Rivals (Attinuator, 2003)

Extended Plays

- And Here Lies Love (Attinuator, 2010)
