= Re-Constriction Records =

US record label

- Parent company: Cargo Music
- Founded: 1992
- Founder: Chase
- Status: Defunct
- Distributor: Cargo Music, Inc.
- Genre: Electro-industrial, industrial rock
- Country of origin: United States
- Location: San Diego, California

Re-Constriction Records was a division of Cargo Music based in California. The label was founded in 1992 and headed by Chase, who previously was the music director at KCR, a student radio station on the campus of San Diego State University. They specialized in releasing bands belonging to the industrial, aggrotech, and EBM genres.

After the label folded, Chase worked for Access Communications for 14 years in video game-related public relations, including helping to launch Twitch in 2011. In May 2013, he took a staff job at Twitch overseeing all of their PR efforts. In 2019, he left Twitch and soon joined StreamElements. After 6 years, he left StreamElements to work at videogame publisher Metatheory in 2025 to help launch Gido Gido: Kaiju Battle Party.

== History ==
Chase contacted Belgium-based industrial label KK Records, a division of Cargo Music, to arrange for product servicing for the station which led to him getting a job with Cargo. While doing promotional work for their KK label in North America, Chase convinced Cargo Music to allow him to start a new division called Re-Constriction Records.

The first band signed to the label was Diatribe and then 16volt and The Clay People. That helped define the "Re-Con" sound of heavy guitars over electronics with vocalists who did not overprocess their voices. Chase adhered to this blueprint throughout much of the label's existence. The label's debut release was the 1992 EP Nothing by Diatribe. The top selling release on his label was Shut Up Kitty, the first domestic industrial dance cover song compilation. It inspired other compilations notably 21st Circuitry's Newer Wave and Newer Wave 2.0 releases. Other unique industrial cover song releases which predated the popularity of this trend included Operation Beatbox (covers of hip hop songs), TV Terror (a 2 CD compilation featuring covers of Television theme songs), Cyberpunk Fiction (A satirical spoof of the Pulp Fiction soundtrack) and Nod's Tacklebox o' Fun (assorted pop hits).

Re-Constriction Records folded in 1999 after releasing approximately 40 records. While running Re-Constriction, Chase began, owned, and ran a compilation-only label called If It Moves... which featured Torture Tech Overdrive (1991), The Cyberflesh Conspiracy (1992), Rivet Head Culture (1993), and Scavengers in the Matrix (1994). The Cyberflesh Conspiracy featured the only song which Stabbing Westward released on CD prior to being signed to a major label, while Rivet Head Culture was notable for popularizing the term "rivet head" (a descriptor for fans of industrial dance music) and featuring a song by Raw Dog, an unreleased side project by Nivek Ogre and Dave Ogilvie of Skinny Puppy.

== Discography ==
- Re-Constriction Records discography

== Notable artists ==
- 16volt
- Apparatus
- Christ Analogue
- The Clay People
- Collide
- Diatribe
- H3llb3nt
- Hexedene
- Iron Lung Corp
- Killing Floor
- Leæther Strip
- Non-Aggression Pact
- Numb
- Purr Machine
- SMP
- Society Burning
- Swamp Terrorists
- Tinfed
- Vampire Rodents
- Waiting for God
