= Infiltrate & Corrupt! =

Compilation album by Various artists
- Released: March 24, 1997
- Genre: Electro-industrial; EBM
- Length: 72:56
- Label: COP Intl.

COP International V/A chronology
Diva X Machina (1997)	Infiltrate & Corrupt! (1997)	14 Years of Electronic Challenge Vol. II (1997)

Infiltrate & Corrupt! is a compilation album featuring various artists, which was released on March 24, 1997, by COP International.

== Reception ==
The album titled "Sonic Boom" provides an excellent cross section of the COP International roster for anyone interested in the sounds of their current roster. The critic went on to praise the new bands Urania and Imbue, both formerly Under the Noise, for "exhibit[ing] a fresh new sound while still containing a few old roots that made their previous band so successful."

== Track listing ==
No.	Title	Writer(s)	Artist	Length
1.	"Chasing the Flag"	Nigel; Phillips; Walters	Imbue	4:18
2.	"You Can't Take It!"	Shawn Brice; Christian Petke	Deathline International	3:45
3.	"My Disguise" (Dementia Mix)	Warren Harrison	Fishtank No. 9	4:45
4.	"Life Unfolds" (97 Edit)	Torsten Hartwell; Rey Osburn; Mike Paikos; Alan Sartirana; Mike Welch	Slave Unit	4:30
5.	"God Soiled"		Finally God	4:34
6.	"Hanged Man"	Corey Gunderson; Karen Kardell	The Razor Skyline	3:39
7.	"Zero Becomes One"	George Hagegeorge; Melissa Sharlat	Urania	3:59
8.	"Dopplegänger"	Maria Azevedo; Brice; Evan Sornstein	Battery	3:56
9.	"Bliss" (Extended Minimal Fade)	Cody Cast; Eric Lawrence Chamberlain	Index	7:50
10.	"Growing Deep Inside"	Dirk Ivens	Dive	3:41
11.	"Remains" (A Capella Edit)	Samuel Pfannkuche; John Ricker	Pulse Legion	4:50
12.	"Holle" (Meow Mix)	Azevedo; Brice; Sornstein	Ivoux	4:27
13.	"Rejoice"	G.W. Childs; Jay Tye	Soil & Eclipse	5:11

== Personnel ==
Adapted from the Infiltrate & Corrupt! liner notes.

- Stefan Noltemeyer – mastering
- Christian Petke (as Count Zero) – compiling, design

== Release history ==
Region	Date	Label	Format	Catalog
United States	1997	COP Intl.	CD	COP 037
