= COP Compilation =

Compilation album by Various artists
- Released: January 20, 1997
- Genre: Electro-industrial
- Length: 66:04
- Label: COP Intl.

COP International V/A chronology
New Life: 13 Years of Electronic Lust (1996)	COP Compilation (1997)	Diva X Machina (1997)

COP Compilation is a various artists compilation album released on January 20, 1997 by COP International.

== Reception ==
Professional ratings
Review scores
Source	Rating
Allmusic	3/5 stars

AllMusic gave COP Compilation a rating of three out of five stars, saying "the majority of these cuts are prime industrial", crediting the tracks by Deathline International and Slave Unit as the album's highlights, "with only a few mediocre offerings from Index, Heavy Water Unit and Battery." Black Monday criticized the release for not representing the musical quality of COP International and said "if your not familiar with the label, or the musicians, this is a safe buy; you'll be enchanted by the unique feel and integrity of the COP clan of musicians." Sonic Boom called the album "an excellent compilation for both a first time COP purchaser and for completest's as they can either sample the entire label on this single release or collect all the track found only here." The album peaked at number twenty-five on CMJ New Music Monthly's top dance releases in 1997.

== Track listing ==
No.	Title	Writer(s)	Artist	Length
1.	"Sun" (Floe Shut Mix by Swamp Terrorists)	George Hagegeorge; Ric Nigel	Under the Noise	6:46
2.	"Eclipse"	Warren Harrison	Fishtank No. 9	4:43
3.	"Frostbite" (Psychotic Mix)	Torsten Hartwell; Rey Osburn; Mike Paikos; Alan Sartirana; Mike Welch	Slave Unit	4:02
4.	"Open Your Eyes" (Numb Remix by Don Gordon)	Shawn Brice; Christian Petke	Deathline International	4:02
5.	"Ne Plus Ultra" (Blue Snow Mix)	Cody Cast; Eric Lawrence Chamberlain	Index	4:56
6.	"Transit"	Maria Azevedo; Brice; Evan Sornstein	Battery	4:17
7.	"Victim (Sanction of the Victim)"	Dave Gronson	Heavy Water Factory	4:37
8.	"Orchid" (Remix)	Warren Harrison	...Of Skin & Saliva	4:43
9.	"Stuck"	Hartwell; Osburn; Paikos; Sartirana; Welch	Slave Unit	5:20
10.	"Cutting Thin Blue Lines" (Freak Mix)	Brice; Christian Petke	Deathline International	5:10
11.	"Christine"	Azevedo; Brice; Sornstein	Battery	4:03
12.	"Halcyon Ghetto"	Cody Cast; Eric Lawrence Chamberlain	Index	4:14
13.	"Manna"	Hagegeorge; Nigel	Under the Noise	4:34
14.	"Angela" (Grand Minimal Mix)	Karen Kardell; Corey Gunderson	The Razor Skyline	4:37

== Accolades ==
Year	Publication	Country	Accolade	Rank
1995	CMJ New Music Monthly	United States	"Top 25 Dance"	25
"*" denotes an unordered list.

== Personnel ==
Adapted from the COP Compilation liner notes.

- Kim Hansen (as Kim X) – compiling
- Evan Sornstein (Curium Design) – cover art, photography
- Christian Petke (as Count Zero) – compiling
- Stefan Vardopoulos – mastering

== Release history ==
Region	Date	Label	Format	Catalog
United States	1997	COP Intl.	CD	COP 026
