= Diva X Machina =

Compilation album by Various artists
- Released: February 18, 1997
- Genres: Electro-industrial; dark wave
- Length: 68:25
- Label: COP Intl.

COP International V/A chronology
COP Compilation (1997)	Diva X Machina (1997)	Infiltrate & Corrupt! (1997)

Diva X Machina series chronology
Diva X Machina (1997)	Diva X Machina 2 (1997)

Diva X Machina is a various artists compilation album released on February 18, 1997, by COP International. The collection was released intending to showcase the burgeoning feminine presence in gothic/industrial music and was the first international compilation to do so featuring all female vocalists.

== Reception ==
Professional ratings
Review scores
Source	Rating
AllMusic	2.5/5 stars

AllMusic gave Diva X Machina two and half out of five possible stars. Sonic Boom lauded the album for "shatter[ing] all previous misconceptions" and presenting "all sides of the more diverse gender."

== Track listing ==
No.	Title	Writer(s)	Artist	Length
1.	"Queen of Heaven"	Karen Kardell; Corey Gunderson	The Razor Skyline	4:12
2.	"Regodless"	Mark Anquoe; Caroline Blind; CWHK	Sunshine Blind	3:09
3.	"Devil in Disguise"	Bernie Baum; Bill Giant; Florence Kaye	Coptic Rain	4:29
4.	"Fucked Up Generation"	Mark Blasquez; Linda LeSabre	Death Ride 69	3:49
5.	"Revenge" (Post Mortem Edit)	Madame Quattorze	Thrive	5:34
6.	"Spring" (Nosferatu Mix)	Daniel Kleczyński; Leszek Rakowski; Katarzyna Ziemek	Fading Colours	5:09
7.	"Turn"	Katie Helsby; Ian Palmer; Jonathan Sharp	Hexedene	4:53
8.	"Repress" (Microtronic Edit)	Maria Azevedo; Brice; Evan Sornstein	Battery	3:57
9.	"Indulgence"	Robert Andrew Bowman; Adelheid "Heidi" Winkler	Randolph's Grin	4:45
10.	"Beneath the Skin" (Adrenaline Edit)	kaRIN; Statik	Collide	5:11
11.	"Down"	Shikhee D'iordna	Android Lust	3:07
12.	"Rush"	Wrex Mock; Gear Sullins; Patrice Synthea	Regenerator	3:26
13.	"Attrition I Am" (Eternity Mix)	Martin Bowes	Attrition	4:44
14.	"The Shepherd's Deathline"	Benoît Blanchart; Séba Dolimont	Aïboforcen	4:13
15.	"Revenge"	Daemon Cadman; Martin Myers; Greg Price	Waiting for God	4:18
16.	"Red. Black and Blue"	Andrea DiNapoli; David Winn	Venus Walk	3:30

== Personnel ==
Adapted from the Diva X Machina liner notes.

- Erik Butler – photography
- Kim Hansen (as Kim X) – compiling
- Stefan "Lupo" Noltemeyer – mastering
- Christian Petke (as Count Zero) – compiling
- Amanda Williams – cover art

== Release history ==
Region	Date	Label	Format	Catalog
United States	1997	COP Intl.	CD	COP 027
