= Diva X Machina 2 =

Compilation album by Various artists
- Released: July 14, 1998
- Genres: Electro-industrial; EBM; dark wave
- Length: 71:11
- Label: COP Intl.

COP International V/A chronology
14 Years of Electronic Challenge Vol. II (1997)	Diva X Machina 2 (1998)	New Violent Breed (1998)

Diva X Machina series chronology
Diva X Machina (1997)	Diva X Machina 2 (1998)	Diva X Machina 3 (2000)

Diva X Machina 2 is a various artists compilation album released on July 14, 1998, by COP International. The compilation peaked at No. 2 on the CMJ RPM charts.

== Reception ==
Professional ratings
Review scores
Source	Rating
AllMusic	2.5/5 stars

AllMusic gave Diva X Machina 2 a two-and-a-half out of five possible stars. A critic at Last Sigh Magazine called the collection "an important addition to have on hand for DJ's" and "an excellent addition to any CD collection as it portrays a wide variety of "industrial" sounds from the more mellow works of Ivoux to the hard hitting "slap in your face industrial" of Luxt." Alex Steininger of In Music We Trust called the album a "a powerful, seductive breath of life that will allow you to never look at the originals in the same light again." Sonic Boom said "once again COP International pulls together a collection of the female acts who pioneer the way we listen to electronic music" and "every track attempts to outperform its sisters are more often than not, succeeds."

== Track listing ==
No.	Title	Writer(s)	Artist	Length
1.	"162 Darkness" (Darkness Arena Mix)	John Prassas	162 Darkness	6:47
2.	"One Mind" (Radio Edit)	Anders Odden; Vilde Lockert	Magenta	3:28
3.	"The Betrayal" (Megamix)	Maria Azevedo; Shawn Brice; Evan Sornstein	Battery	4:20
4.	"No Escape" (Pankow Mix)	Isabelle Gernand; Marc Werner	Sabotage Q.C.Q.C.?	7:06
5.	"Spite"	Anna Christine; Erie Loch	LUXT	3:30
6.	"Twisted"	Sheldon Reynolds	Lucid Dementia	4:07
7.	"Make My Nana"	Donna Regina	Donna Regina	3:37
8.	"Hypocrite"	Sheldon Reynolds	Clan of Xymox	4:44
9.	"Pleiadian Agenda"	Vas Kallas; Kaizer Von Loopy	Hanzel und Gretyl	3:39
10.	"Dive"	John Dubs; Kristin Kowalski	Evulva	6:01
11.	"Butterfly"	Matt Ballesteros; Charlie Dennis; Eric Fisher; Kevin Serra; Paul Sutherland	Tapping the Vein	4:35
12.	"Serpents Serenade"	Erin Allen; Steve Stegg; Heather Thompson	This Ascension	3:50
13.	"Exit Zero"	Angela Goodman; Corey Gunderson	The Razor Skyline	3:17
14.	"Your Face in the Sun"	Simon Balestrazzi; Angelo Bergamini; Emilia Lo Jacono	Kirlian Camera	6:35
15.	"Sif"	Azevedo; Brice; Sornstein	Ivoux	5:35

== Personnel ==
Adapted from the Diva X Machina 2 liner notes.

- Kim Hansen (as Kim X) – compiling
- Louis "Magic" Zachert – mastering
- Nadine – cover art
- Christian Petke (as Count Zero) – compiling, design

== Release history ==
Region	Date	Label	Format	Catalog
United States	1998	COP Intl.	CD	COP 039
