= Ivoux =

Electronic music project

- Origin: San Francisco, California, United States
- Genres: Ambient
- Years active: 1996-1999
- Label: COP Intl.
- Past members: Maria Azevedo; Shawn Brice; Evan Sornstein

Ivoux was the name of an electronic music project founded by musicians Maria Azevedo, Shawn Brice and Evan Sornstein and based in San Francisco. The name "Ivoux" stands for "voice", which signifies storytelling and personal expression. The band released one studio album titled Frozen: A Suite of Winter Songs in 1998 for COP International.

== History ==
Ivoux was created as a collaborative project by Battery members Maria Azevedo and Evan Sornstein, who began recording for the project in December 1996. They pressed the music to cassette and showed it to Battery bandmate Shawn Brice, who began writing music for the band's first release. In 1998 Ivoux released Frozen: A Suite of Winter Songs on COP International. The album comprises nine compositions, each one representing a different femininity based winter myth and fairy tale. The tracks "Holle" (Meow Mix) and "Sif" and were released on the COP Intl. various artists compilations Infiltrate & Corrupt! and Diva X Machina 2 respectively. The music draws inspiration from several sources: H. A. Geuber's Myths of the Norsemen; Hans Christian Andersen's Complete Illustrated Stories; The Brothers Grimm's Complete Illustrated Stories; and C. S. Lewis's The Lion, the Witch and the Wardrobe. A second album was planned, tentatively titled Lost, but Ivoux disbanded before the album ever came into fruition.

== Discography ==
Studio albums

- Frozen: A Suite of Winter Songs (1997, Federation/COP Int'l.)
