= Lilith 3.2 =

EP by Battery
- Released: August 2, 1994
- Studio: The Fringe (Oakland, California)
- Genre: Electro-industrial
- Length: 18:35
- Label: COP Intl.
- Producer: Maria Azevedo; Shawn Brice; Christian Petke; Evan Sornstein

Battery chronology
Mutate (1993)	Lilith 3.2 (1994)	nv (1995)

Lilith 3.2 is the third EP by Battery, released on August 2, 1994, by COP International.

== Reception ==
Industrial Reviews gave Lilith 3.2 three stars out of five and praised the cheery nostalgia of "Pax Neurotica" and bleak atmosphere of "Lilith". Sonic Boom said "If you are looking for a band with unbelievable strong female vocals and who are not afraid to develop a music style all of their own that have a listen to Battery and I am sure that you will not be disappointed."

== Track listing ==
No.	Title	Lyrics	Music	Length
1.	"Pax Neurotica"	Shawn Brice; Evan Sornstein	Shawn Brice; Stuart Scanlon; Evan Sornstein	3:23
2.	"Digital Angel"	Sornstein	Sornstein	3:42
3.	"The Keep" (Edit)	Azevedo	Azevedo	7:59
4.	"Lilith"		Brice; Sornstein	3:31

== Personnel ==
Adapted from the Lilith 3.2 liner notes.

Battery

- Maria Azevedo – production, lead vocals (3), backing vocals (2)
- Shawn Brice – instruments, production, backing vocals (2)
- Evan Sornstein (Curium Design) – instruments, production, lead vocals (2), cover art, illustrations, design

Production and design

- Christian Petke (as Count Zero) – production

== Release history ==
Region	Date	Label	Format	Catalog
Germany	1994	COP Intl.	CD	COP 009
