= Frozen: A Suite of Winter Songs =

Studio album by Ivoux
- Released: March 10, 1998
- Genre: Darkwave; ethereal wave
- Length: 47:54
- Label: Federation/COP Int'l.
- Producer: Maria Azevedo; Shawn Brice; Evan Sornstein

Frozen: A Suite of Winter Songs is the debut studio album of Ivoux, released on March 10, 1998, by Federation Records COP Int'l. The recording sessions for the album were first pressed to cassette in December 1996 by founding members Maria Azevedo and Evan Sornstein.

== Reception ==
Last Sigh called Frozen: A Suite of Winter Songs a "sensitive and deeply moving composition" that's "wonderfully soft and elegant, with a unique flare" Sonic Boom called the album "the most Gothic release produced by this trio, albeit it shares more in common with the Darkwave and Ethereal scenes than true Gothic music due to its lack of guitars."

== Track listing ==
All music is composed by Maria Azevedo, Shawn Brice and Evan Sornstein

No.	Title	Length
1.	"The White Witch"	5:00
2.	"Proserpina"	5:02
3.	"Rusalka"	4:27
4.	"Emily"	5:19
5.	"Sif"	5:38
6.	"Yuki Onna"	7:25
7.	"Koturine"	4:54
8.	"Holle"	3:03
9.	"Snow Queen"	7:06

== Personnel ==
Adapted from the Frozen: A Suite of Winter Songs liner notes.

Ivoux

- Maria Azevedo – lead vocals, production, recording
- Shawn Brice – instruments, production, recording
- Evan Sornstein (Curium Design) – instruments, production, recording, design

Additional performers

- Melanie Olstad – spoken word (6)

Production and design

- Stefan Noltemeyer – mastering

== Release history ==
Region	Date	Label	Format	Catalog
Germany	1998	Federation/COP Int'l.	CD	FED 2001, COP 035
