= Momentum (Battery EP) =

EP by Battery
- Released: November 17, 1998
- Studio: The Pit Studios (Oakland, California)
- Genre: Electro-industrial
- Length: 29:43
- Label: COP Intl.
- Producer: Maria Azevedo; Shawn Brice; Christian Petke; Evan Sornstein

Battery chronology
Aftermath (1998)	Momentum (1998)	Debris (1999)

Momentum is the fourth EP by Battery, released on November 17, 1998, by COP International. The album peaked at No. 15 on the CMJ RPM charts.

== Reception ==
A critic at Last Sigh Magazine called Momentum "not music to necessarily relax to, Hate Dept., Cameron Lewis (Ipecac Loop), Fishtank No. 9 and Heavy Water Factory kick it hard with their own renditions of Battery songs that whisp the listener into another dimension of high intensity sound energy." Sonic Boom said "If you are looking for a band with unbelievable strong female vocals and who are not afraid to develop a music style all of their own that have a listen to Battery and I am sure that you will not be disappointed."

== Track listing ==
All lyrics are written by Maria Azevedo; all music is composed by Shawn Brice and Evan Sornstein.

No.	Title	Remixer(s)	Length
1.	"Betrayal" (Edit)		3:37
2.	"This Much" (Hate Dept. Remix)	Steven Seibold	4:07
3.	"Headcheck"		4:16
4.	"Betrayal" (Exit Planet Hwf Remix)	Jesse Mcclear	4:41
5.	"Doppelganger" (Majestic)	Warren Harrison	4:58
6.	"Theme" (Dub)		4:57
7.	"Theme" (Eulogy Edit)	Cameron Lewis	3:07

== Personnel ==
Adapted from the Momentum liner notes.

Battery

- Maria Azevedo – lead vocals, production, recording
- Shawn Brice – instruments, production, recording
- Evan Sornstein (Curium Design) – instruments, production, recording, cover art, illustrations, design

Additional performers

- Warren Harrison – remixer (5)
- Cameron Lewis – remixer (7)
- Jesse McClear – remixer (4)
- Steven Seibold – remixer (2)

Production and design

- Christian Petke (as Count Zero) – production

== Release history ==
Region	Date	Label	Format	Catalog
Germany	1998	COP Intl.	CD	COP 041
