= Chaos Compilation =

Compilation album by Various artists
- Released: May 1, 1995
- Genres: Electro-industrial; EBM
- Length: 72:56
- Label: COP Intl.

COP International V/A chronology
Cyber Core Compilation (1994)	Chaos Compilation (1995)	New Life: 13 Years of Electronic Lust (1996)

Chaos Compilation is a various artists compilation album released on May 1, 1995, by COP International.

== Reception ==
Black Monday called Chaos Compilation "a most wonderful compilation" and named "Canine" by Tongue as the best song of the year. Sonic Boom called the album "a reasonably conclusive collection of recent caustic coldwave industrial chaos" and "a very strong coldwave industrial compilation albeit heavy on previously signed bands." The album peaked at number six on CMJ New Music Monthly's top dance releases in 1995.

== Track listing ==
No.	Title	Writer(s)	Artist	Length
1.	"Serenade for the Dead"	Claus Larsen	Leæther Strip	3:53
2.	"Strong Hold"	Jack Boughner; Marque Rebmann; Dave Smith	Pinchpoint	4:38
3.	"Wrench"	Blake Barnes; Scott Morgan; David York	Apparatus	4:49
4.	"Send Me a Sign"	Gerry Owens, Emmet O’Connell, Santos De Castro	Arcane Asylum	4:58
5.	"Tainted Love" (Soft Cell cover)	Ed Cobb	Deathline International	3:59
6.	"Future Automatic"	George Hagegeorge; Ric Nigel	Under the Noise	5:49
7.	"My Time"	John Hopkins	Piece Machine	3:12
8.	"Get O." (LP Remix)	Michael Antener; Ane Hebeisen	Swamp Terrorists	4:27
9.	"On a Threat"	Shonn Bratlien; Thomas Smith	Pain Emission	5:05
10.	"Shine 2001"	Vas Kallas; Kaizer Von Loopy	Hanzel und Gretyl	3:55
11.	"Canine"	Marian Donnelly	Tongue	6:15
12.	"Thinker"	Steven Seibold	Hate Dept.	3:36
13.	"Static Sky"	Cody Cast; Eric Lawrence Chamberlain	Index	4:54
14.	"Velociraptor"	Warren Harrison	...Of Skin & Saliva	4:17
15.	"Retortion 003"	Thomas Franzmann; Markus Nikolai	Bigod 20	5:39
16.	"Nevermore" (Zen Mix)	Maria Azevedo; Shawn Brice; Evan Sornstein	Battery	3:32

== Accolades ==
Year	Publication	Country	Accolade	Rank
1995	CMJ New Music Monthly	United States	"Top 25 Dance"	6
"*" denotes an unordered list.

== Personnel ==
Adapted from the Chaos Compilation liner notes.

- Kim Hansen (as Kim X) – compiling
- Evan Sornstein (Curium Design) – cover art, photography
- Christian Petke (as Count Zero) – compiling
- Stefan Vardopoulos – mastering

== Release history ==
Region	Date	Label	Format	Catalog
United States	1994	COP Intl.	CD	COP 014
