= Eternal Darkness (EP) =

EP by Battery
- Released: 1991
- Recorded: July 1991
- Studio: Dynamaphone (San Francisco, California)
- Genre: Industrial rock
- Length: 16:22
- Label: COP Intl.
- Producer: Shawn Brice; Stuart Scanlon; Evan Sornstein

Battery chronology
Eternal Darkness (1991)	Meat Market (1992)

Eternal Darkness is the debut EP of Battery, released in 1991 by COP International.

== Music ==
Founding members Shawn Brice and Evan Sornstein met at Bennington College in Vermont in 1989. Both were influenced by electronic music, with Sornstein having grown up listening to Wendy Carlos (formerly Walter Carlos), Kraftwerk, Klaus Schultze and Isao Tomita. After composing as a duo they decided to recruit fellow student Stuart Scanlon to fill membership and earn extra credit and money - the college paid bands a hundred dollars to perform for a live audience. When asked why the name Battery appealed to its members, they replied: "According to any standard American dictionary it signifies: a percussion section of an orchestra, the artillery section of an army, cells where energy is stored, the dock/loading industrial section of a major city, and on and on."

After the members of Battery graduated and Scanlon parted ways with the band Brice and Sornstein met Christian Petke of Deathline International, who decided to launch COP International with Battery and Diatribe as its lead bands. In 1992 the title track appeared on the California Cyber Crash Compilation, one of the first releases by COP Intl, and "Never Forget" was provided to Zoth Ommog Records for Body Rapture II.

== Reception ==
Industrial Reviews gave Eternal Darkness four stars out of five and praised the thoughtfulness, energy and charm across the EP's four compositions, especially on the lead and coda tracks.

== Track listing ==
All tracks are written by Shawn Brice, Stuart Scanlon and Evan Sornstein.

This Side
No.	Title	Length
1.	"Eternal Darkness"	5:08
2.	"Incest"	3:33

Other Side
No.	Title	Length
1.	"Never Forget"	5:40
2.	"No Release"	2:01

== Personnel ==
Adapted from the Eternal Darkness liner notes.

Battery

- Shawn Brice – instruments, production, engineering
- Stuart Scanlon – instruments, production, engineering
- Evan Sornstein (Curium Design) – instruments, production, engineering, cover art

Production and design

- Christa Brüggemann (as SST) – mastering
- Pain Less – assistant production
- Christian Petke (as Count Zero) – assistant production

== Release history ==
Region	Date	Label	Format	Catalog
Germany	1991	COP Intl.	LP	COP 001
