= Meat Market (EP) =

EP by Battery
- Released: 1992
- Recorded: July 1991
- Studios: The Ninth Academy (Berkeley, California)
- Genre: Industrial rock
- Length: 19:57
- Label: COP Intl.
- Producers: Shawn Brice; Christian Petke; Evan Sornstein

Battery chronology
| Eternal Darkness (1991) | Meat Market (1992) | Mutate (1993) |

Meat Market is the second EP by Battery, released in 1992 by COP International. The artwork for the release was accidentally switched with Nothing by Diatribe.

== Music ==
After the members of Battery graduated from college, Shawn Brice and Evan Sornstein moved to San Francisco, with former vocalist Stuart Scanlon leaving the band to work on 3D graphics in New York. The band knew Maria Azevedo for being the roommate of former member Evan Sornstein's sister at college. The band wanted to introduce a feminine angle to what they considered the male dominated genere of industrial music and recruited Azevedo as their vocalist after she informed them of her singing ability and auditioned her during a life performance. Azevedo debuted in the recording studio with the band on the track "Communion", which she co-wrote. Azevedo was formerly untrained at the time and received professional vocal lessons after the release of the band's 1993 debut Mutate to acquire confidence touring. When Industrialnation asked founding member Evan Sornstein about the band's place in the then current industrial music scene, he said:

When we first started doing the industrial thing, we always had a hard time coming to terms with a lot of the angst that was pervasive in the music. We weren't angry people. I mean, we had our own internal conflicts and everyone has their own problems, but it wasn't the same kind of anger. We really liked the music because it had a wonderful energy that we were really interested in, so we emulated it as much as we could but it just wasn't there for us. I think we've come to terms now with what we care to express without it being an extension of the genre.

== Reception ==
Industrial Reviews gave Eternal Darkness four stars out of five and praised the thoughtfulness, energy and charm across the EP's four compositions, especially on the lead and coda tracks.

== Track listing ==
| No. | Title | Lyrics | Music | Length |
|---|---|---|---|---|
| 1. | "Meat Market" (Radio Mix) | Shawn Brice; Evan Sornstein | Shawn Brice; Stuart Scanlon; Evan Sornstein | 5:46 |
| 2. | "Meat Market" (Dance Mix) | Brice; Sornstein | Brice; Scanlon; Sornstein | 5:09 |
| 3. | "Communion" (Radio Mix) | Maria Azevedo | Brice; Sornstein | 4:36 |
| 4. | "In Christine's Womb, Unwanted" (Meat Market Ambient Mix) | | Brice; Sornstein | 4:26 |

== Personnel ==
Adapted from the Meat Market liner notes.

Battery

- Maria Azevedo – instruments, lead vocals (3)
- Shawn Brice – instruments, vocals (1, 2), production (3, 4), backing vocals (3)
- Evan Sornstein (Curium Design) – instruments, vocals (1, 2), cover art, photography, typography, production (3, 4), backing vocals (3)

Production and design

- Christian Petke (as Count Zero) – production (1, 2)

== Release history ==
| Region | Date | Label | Format | Catalog |
|---|---|---|---|---|
| Germany | 1992 | COP Intl. | CD | COP 002 |
