= 14 Years of Electronic Challenge Vol. II =

Compilation album by Various artists
- Released: September 30, 1997
- Genre: EBM
- Length: 74:39
- Label: COP Intl.

COP International V/A chronology
Infiltrate & Corrupt! (1997)	14 Years of Electronic Challenge Vol. II (1997)	Diva X Machina 2 (1998)

14 Years of Electronic Challenge series chronology
14 Years of Electronic Challenge Vol. II (1998)	The Electronic Challenge Vol. 3 (1999)

14 Years of Electronic Challenge Vol. II is a various artists compilation album released on September 30, 1997, by COP International.

== Reception ==
Professional ratings
Review scores
Source	Rating
AllMusic	3.5/5 stars

Steve Huey of AllMusic notes the presence of "veteran industrial/dance acts." Black Monday said "you may be familiar with these bands, but the songs found here are mostly unknown or rare mixes, showcasing the classic along with the new breed of electronic musicians" and "with this lineup, how could one not be impressed with 14 Years...?" Sonic Boom was negative in their reception of the collection, saying "anyone who has any experience with this music already would have acquired all of the tracks present here years ago" and that it "serves a single purpose, to entice first time listeners to the Electro-Industrial genre."

== Track listing ==
No.	Title	Writer(s)	Artist	Length
1.	"Mirthless Knick Knack"	Sevren Ni-Arb	X-Marks the Pedwalk	5:20
2.	"Mother" (IIIrd Confession Version)	Rudolf Ratzinger	wumpscut	5:54
3.	"Morpheus Laughing"	cEvin Key; Dwayne Goettel; Kevin Ogilvie	Skinny Puppy	4:03
4.	"I Walk the Line"	David James; Christine Wade; Nicholas Wade	Alien Sex Fiend	4:52
5.	"Mambo Witch" (12" Version)	Chrismar Chayell; Marc Heyndrickx	A Split-Second	5:36
6.	"Burning Heretic" (Crisp Version)	Stephan Groth	Apoptygma Berzerk	6:13
7.	"Japanese Bodies"	Björn Jünemann	Haujobb	4:44
8.	"Repress" (Microtronic Edit)	Claus Larsen	Leæther Strip	4:38
9.	"Getting Closer"	Bon Harris; Douglas McCarthy	Nitzer Ebb	4:14
10.	"Meat Market" (SF Dance Mix)	Shawn Brice; Stuart Scanlon; Evan Sornstein	Battery	4:50
11.	"To the Hilt" (LP Version)	Lee Altus; Mary Buck; Jürgen Engler	Die Krupps	4:49
12.	"Mindphaser"	Bill Leeb; Rhys Fulber	Front Line Assembly	6:44
13.	"The Bog" (Terror Mix)	Jean-Luc De Meyer; Markus Nikolai; Andreas Tomalla	Bigod 20	5:29
14.	"Blood in Face"	Peter Devin	yelworC	8:14

== Personnel ==
Adapted from the 14 Years of Electronic Challenge Vol. II liner notes.

- Markus Becker – compiling
- Jason Graham – photography
- Frank Kaeding – compiling
- Christian Petke (as Count Zero) – compiling, design

== Release history ==
Region	Date	Label	Format	Catalog
United States	1997	COP Intl.	CD	COP 032
