= Reality Check (Deathline International album) =

Studio album by Deathline International
- Released: May 10, 1993
- Studio: Various: Crack Alley Studio; (Berkeley, California); Die Halle; (Frankfurt am Main, Hesse)
- Genre: Industrial rock; industrial metal
- Length: 55:00
- Label: COP Intl.
- Producer: Shawn Brice; Armin Johnert; Christian Petke

Deathline International chronology
Reality Check (1993)	Venus Mind Trap (1995)

Reality Check is the debut studio album by American industrial rock group Deathline International, released on May 10, 1993, by COP International.

== Track listing ==
All tracks are written by Shawn Brice and Christian Petke.

No.	Title	Length
1.	"Moth in the Flame"	4:21
2.	"Demand the Flow of Ideas" (Metal Mix)	4:30
3.	"Walk with Me"	4:56
4.	"Welcome (To the Free World)"	4:29
5.	"Flowers of Evil"	4:45
6.	"Fun at the Mall"	3:43
7.	"The Hunt"	4:40
8.	"Teutonic March" (Wizard's Tear Mix)	6:49
9.	"I Want You"	5:21
10.	"Bodyland"	7:30
11.	"Ethnic Cleansing"	6:17

== Personnel ==
Adapted from the Reality Check liner notes.

Deathline International

- Shawn Brice (as Wiz Art) – vocals, trombone, producer
- Christian Petke (as Count Zero) – vocals, producer, cover art

Additional performers

- Maria Azevedo – backing vocals (5)
- John Carson – bass guitar
- Kim Hansen (as Kim X) – backing vocals
- Alfred Harth – saxophone, bass clarinet
- Seppl Niemeyer – drums
- Suzanne Santos – backing vocals

Production and design

- Armin Johnert – producer
- Stefan Noltemeyer – mastering
- Kim Phan – photography
- Evan Sornstein (Curium Design) – design, typography

== Release history ==
Region	Date	Label	Format	Catalog
United States	1993	COP Int'l	CD	COP 006
