= Zarathoustra =

Studio album by Deathline International
- Released: November 16, 1995
- Studio: Various: Crack Alley Studio; (Berkeley, California); Die Halle; (Frankfurt am Main, Hesse)
- Genre: Industrial rock
- Length: 76:56
- Label: COP Intl.
- Producer: Shawn Brice; Don Gordon; Christian Petke

Deathline International chronology
Venus Mind Trap (1995)	Zarathoustra (1995)	Arashi Syndrom (1997)

Zarathoustra is the second studio album by Deathline International, released on November 16, 1995 by COP International.

== Reception ==
Black Monday called Zarathoustra "remarkable, intelligent and a must for your collection" and "this is human creativity mingling with technology via expressive interpretation of life, knowledge and freedom." Sonic Boom said that a "fan of all forms of industrial music should find something addicting on this album as Deathline International refused to be constrained within the fragile shell of a particular genre and instead prefer to utilize elements of all of them."

== Track listing ==
All tracks are written by Shawn Brice and Christian Petke, except "Tainted Love" by Ed Cobb and "Rawhide" by Dimitri Tiomkin and Ned Washington.

No.	Title	Length
1.	"Sub Space Overture"	1:54
2.	"Tainted Love" (Soft Cell cover)	4:01
3.	"Brot und Spiele"	3:59
4.	"Time"	6:48
5.	"Rawhide" (Frankie Laine cover)	4:03
6.	"Venus Dance Trip" (Consolidated Remix)	4:59
7.	"Sometimes"	5:02
8.	"Disease"	3:56
9.	"Sacrifice/Rot"	4:38
10.	"Circle of Pain"	5:17
11.	"Evil You Shun"	3:41
12.	"Cutting Thin Blue Lines"	5:20
13.	"Alone"	6:36
14.	"Zarathoustra"	3:30
15.	"War Chant Ma$chine" (PCB Edit)	3:03
16.	"Ethnic Cleansing" (Numb Remix)	4:02
17.	"Moan"	6:07

== Personnel ==
Adapted from the Zarathoustra liner notes.

Deathline International

- Shawn Brice (as Spawn) – vocals, producer, executive-producer, engineering
- Christian Petke (as Count Zero) – singing, producer, engineering, illustrations

Additional performers

- Keith Arem – remixer (15)
- Maria Azevedo – vocals
- I-Li Chang Brice – percussion
- Warren Harrison – keyboards, drums
- Don Gordon – remixer and producer (16)
- Scott Holderby – vocals
- Seppl Niemeyer – drums
- Rey Osburn – guitar
- Mark Pistel – remixer (6)
- Suzanne Santos – vocals
- Thomas Smith – guitar
- Evan Sornstein (Curium Design) – saxophone, illustrations, design

== Release history ==
Region	Date	Label	Format	Catalog
United States	1995	COP Int'l	CD	COP 017
