= Wild Boys (EP) =

EP by Deathline International
- Released: May 1997
- Studio: Fringe (Oakland, California); Mindswerve (New York City)
- Genre: Industrial rock; EBM
- Length: 18:42
- Label: COP Intl.
- Producer: Shawn Brice; Christian Petke

Deathline International chronology
Arashi Syndrom (1997)	Wild Boys (1997)	Cybrid (2001)

Wild Boys is an EP by Deathline International, released in May 1997 by COP International.

== Reception ==
Black Monday called Wild Boys "worthy of anyone's music library" and "for those not keen on Deathline International, the least you could do is obtain "Wild Boys" and see if that sparks your curiosity."

== Track listing ==
No.	Title	Writer(s)	Length
1.	"Wild Boys" (Duran Duran cover)	Simon Le Bon; Nick Rhodes; Andy Taylor; John Taylor; Roger Taylor	3:47
2.	"We Believe" (Sin Phonic Mix)	Shawn Brice; Christian Petke	4:35
3.	"Hoellen Paradies" (Tek Version)	Brice; Petke	3:09
4.	"Wild Boys" (Earth Shock Remix) (Duran Duran cover)	Le Bon; Rhodes; A. Taylor; J. Taylor; R. Taylor	7:11

== Personnel ==
Adapted from the Wild Boys liner notes.

Deathline International

- Shawn Brice (as Spawn) – vocals, producer, executive-producer, engineering
- Christian Petke (as Count 0) – singing, producer, engineering, illustrations

Additional performers

- DJ Bent – remixer (4)
- Mike Welch – guitar

Production and design

- Erik Butler – photography
- Kim Phan – photography

== Release history ==
Region	Date	Label	Format	Catalog
United States	1997	COP Int'l	CD	COP 028
