= Ego Death =

Ego death is a complete loss of subjective self-identity.

Ego Death may also refer to:

- Ego Death (album), by the Internet, 2015
- "Ego Death" (song), by Ty Dolla Sign featuring Kanye West, FKA Twigs, and Skrillex, 2020
- "Ego Death", a song by Alien Faktor from the 1995 album Desolate
- "Ego Death", a song by Busdriver from the 2014 album Perfect Hair
- "Ego Death", a 2020 episode of the British black comedy series I May Destroy You
- Ego Death, a 2006 album by Tim Deluxe
- "Ego Death", a 2022 single by Polyphia
- Ego Death, a 2025 album by Archie Henderson
