= Final Expenses =

EP of remixes by Alien Faktor
- Released: 1996
- Studio: The Womb Studio (Milwaukee, WI)
- Genre: Industrial
- Length: 61:47
- Label: Decibel
- Producer: Tom Muschitz

Alien Faktor chronology
Desolate (1995)	Final Expenses (1996)	Listen! (1996)

Final Expenses is a remix EP by Alien Faktor, released in 1996 by Decibel.

== Reception ==
A critic for Sonic Boom gave Abduction a positive review and said "each track is suitably distinct enough from the original to hardly be remained title the same" and "any previous AF fan or someone who is into bizarrely experimental electro with just a hint accessibility will enjoy this release without failure." Larry Miles of Black Monday and counted "Misanthrope" and "Dawn" as being highlights of the album.

== Track listing ==
All tracks are written by Tom Muschitz, except "Tradition of Violence" co-written with Lars Hansen and Leif Hansen and "Dysphoria" co-written with Leif Hansen.

No.	Title	Length
1.	"No One Can Make Me Do Anything I Don't Want to Do Anyway" (Skullfuckermix)	4:24
2.	"Ego Death" (Apparatus N.C. mix)	3:39
3.	"Dysphoria" (Remix)	4:31
4.	"Obey" (Disodium mix)	4:25
5.	"Ego Death" (Medicine mix)	4:44
6.	"Tradition of Violence"	4:52
7.	"Misanthrope" (Jagged Little Pill mix)	6:06
8.	"Ego Death" (Beaten to Death)	4:22
9.	"Make Me!"	4:15
10.	"Dirge" (Dirgedenoctic)	6:13
11.	"Dawn"	14:16

== Personnel ==
Adapted from the Final Expenses liner notes.

Alien Faktor

- Tom Muschitz – vocals, programming, mastering, remixing (9)

Additional musicians

- Matt Green – remixing (8)
- Lars Hansen – remixing (6)
- Leif Hansen – remixing (6)
- Scott Morgan (as Sid) – remixing (2)
- Chris Peterson – remixing (1)
- Terry Reed (as Warlock) – remixing (5)
- Steven Seibold – remixing (3)
- Jason Simanek – remixing (4)
- Jeff Stoddard – remixing (1)
- David York (as D. York) – remixing (2)

Production and design

- Daniel Streng – design

== Release history ==
Region	Date	Label	Format	Catalog
United States	1996	Decibel	CD	DEC010
