= Spin Zone =

EP by Deathline International
- Released: February 9, 2018
- Genre: Electro-industrial
- Length: 23:03
- Label: COP Intl.

Deathline International chronology
Eisbär (2016)	Spin Zone (2018)	Breaking (2019)

Spin Zone (or Lip Service) is an EP by Deathline International, released on February 9, 2018, by COP International.

== Track listing ==
All tracks are written by Steve Lam, James Perry and Christian Petke, except "Spin Zone" co-written with G.W. Childs.

No.	Title	Length
1.	"Spin Zone" (Punk Edit)	2:45
2.	"Born Again"	3:15
3.	"Lip Service" (Electro Mix)	3:57
4.	"Lip Service" (Everything Goes Cold 8 Bit Mix)	3:24
5.	"Born Again" (BetaMorphose Remix)	4:56
6.	"Lip Service" (C-lekktor Mix)	4:46

== Personnel ==
Adapted from the Spin Zone liner notes.

Deathline International

- Steve Lam (as SLam) – programming, guitar, backing vocals, mixing, bass guitar (1)
- James Perry – guitar, backing vocals, programming (2, 5)
- Christian Petke (as Count 0) – vocals, programming, engineering, mixing

Additional performers

- Angela Goodman – backing vocals (1)
- Caitlin Gutekunst – vocals (3, 4, 6)

== Release history ==
Region	Date	Label	Format	Catalog
United States	2018	COP Int'l	DL	
