= Eisbär (EP) =

EP by Deathline International
- Released: April 26, 2016
- Genre: Electro-industrial
- Length: 18:18
- Label: COP Intl.

Deathline International chronology
Cybrid (2001)	Eisbär (2016)	Spin Zone (2018)

Eisbär is an EP by Deathline International, released on April 26, 2016, by COP International.

== Track listing ==
No.	Title	Writer(s)	Length
1.	"Eisbär" (BhamBhamHara Mix) (Grauzone cover)	Martin Eicher	6:16
2.	"Eisbär" (Grauzone cover)	Eicher	4:04
3.	"Tainted Love" (Soft Cell cover)	Ed Cobb	3:51
4.	"Tainted Love" (John Fryer Remix) (Soft Cell cover)	Cobb	4:07

== Personnel ==
Adapted from the Eisbär liner notes.

Deathline International

- Christian Petke (as Count Zero) – vocals, recording

Additional performers

- Jan Bicker – remixer (1)
- Axel Ermes – remixer (1)
- John Fryer – remixer (4)

Production and design

- Jeremy Goody – recording
- Steve Lam (as Slam) – recording

== Release history ==
Region	Date	Label	Format	Catalog
United States	2016	COP Int'l	DL	
