= Mutate (album) =

Studio album by Battery
- Released: 1993
- Recorded: The Ninth Academy
- Genre: Electro-industrial
- Length: 52:08
- Label: COP Intl.
- Producer: Battery, Christian Petke

Battery chronology
Meat Market (1992)	Mutate (1993)	Lilith 3.2 (1994)

Mutate is the debut studio album of Battery, released in 1993 by COP International.

== Track listing ==
All tracks are written by Maria Azevedo, Shawn Brice and Evan Sornstein.

No.	Title	Length
1.	"Eternal Darkness"	3:54
2.	"Mutate"	3:49
3.	"Meat Market"	4:18
4.	"3Jane"	0:37
5.	"Sinister"	4:50
6.	"The Keep .02"	0:38
7.	"Motherboard Flatline"	3:09
8.	"Hypocrite"	4:50
9.	"The Keep .035"	0:43
10.	"Communion"	4:34
11.	"Resurrection"	4:23
12.	"The Keep .56"	1:53
13.	"The Void"	14:30

== Personnel ==
Adapted from the Mutate liner notes.

Battery

- Maria Azevedo – lead vocals, instruments
- Shawn Brice – instruments, engineering
- Evan Sornstein – instruments

Production and additional personnel

- Battery – production, engineering
- Curium Design – photography, design
- Christian Petke – production, engineering

== Release history ==
Region	Date	Label	Format	Catalog
United States	1993	COP Intl.	CD	COP 005
