= Debris (EP) =

EP by Battery
- Released: 1999
- Studio: The Pit (Oakland, California)
- Genre: Industrial
- Length: 27:22

Battery chronology
Momentum (1998)	Debris (1999)

Debris is the fifth EP by Battery, self-released in 1999.

== Reception ==
Industrial Reviews gave Debris two stars out of five and criticized the compositions for not matching the quality of Battery's past releases.

== Track listing ==
All lyrics are written by Maria Azevedo; all music is composed by Shawn Brice and Evan Sornstein.

No.	Title	Length
1.	"Destruction"	0:12
2.	"Aftermath" (Slave Unit Remix)	1:31
3.	"Strike" (DeepFatFried Mix)	5:09
4.	"Dream3"	4:22
5.	"Doppelgaenger 3.0"	5:16
6.	"Strike" (Negative Impact Remix)	5:24
7.	"Debris"	5:28

== Personnel ==
Adapted from the Debris liner notes.

Battery

- Maria Azevedo – lead vocals
- Shawn Brice – instruments
- Evan Sornstein (Curium Design) – instrument

== Release history ==
Region	Date	Label	Format	Catalog
United States	1999		DL	
