= Arashi Syndrom =

Studio album by Deathline International
- Released: February 15, 1997
- Studio: Fringe (Oakland, California)
- Genre: Industrial rock; EBM
- Length: 43:39
- Label: COP Intl.
- Producer: Shawn Brice; Christian Petke

Deathline International chronology
| Zarathoustra (1995) | Arashi Syndrom (1997) | Wild Boys (1997) |

Arashi Syndrom is the third studio album by Deathline International, released on February 15, 1997 by COP International.

== Reception ==
Professional ratings
Review scores
| Source | Rating |
|---|---|
| AllMusic | 4/5 stars |

Jeremy Ulrey of AllMusic compares the band favorably to Skinny Puppy and the Human League and calls the album "not wholly original, but a successful rearranging of parts nonetheless." Black Monday credited the vocal performances as having improved over previous releases and said "solid, definite and without fear, Deathline have pushed their conglomerated staff of musicians forth with a sound that gets attention." Sonic Boom said the release "broadened the compositional diversity of both the electronics and percussion due to the synergy of the contributing artists." The critic concluded, "ultimately when you add all of these elements together you end up with a very well produced and assembled album." The album peaked at number twenty-one on CMJ New Music Monthly's top dance releases in 1997.

== Track listing ==
All tracks are written by Shawn Brice and Christian Petke, except "Troops of Tomorrow" by Ian Carnochan and "Wild Boys" by Simon Le Bon, Nick Rhodes, Andy Taylor, John Taylor and Roger Taylor.

| No. | Title | Length |
|---|---|---|
| 1. | "Into the Storm" | 2:31 |
| 2. | "Troops of Tomorrow" (The Vibrators cover) | 4:51 |
| 3. | "We Believe" | 4:06 |
| 4. | "You Can't Stop Me" | 4:06 |
| 5. | "Hoellen Paradies" | 3:10 |
| 6. | "Wild Boys" (Duran Duran cover) | 3:53 |
| 7. | "My Friend Is Dead" | 3:46 |
| 8. | "Pain to Me" | 4:38 |
| 9. | "One" | 3:43 |
| 10. | "Mission" | 4:56 |
| 11. | "Murder" | 4:00 |

== Accolades ==
| Year | Publication | Country | Accolade | Rank |
|---|---|---|---|---|
| 1997 | CMJ New Music Monthly | United States | "Top 25 Dance" | 21 |
"*" denotes an unordered list.

== Personnel ==
Adapted from the Arashi Syndrom liner notes.

Deathline International

- Shawn Brice (as Spawn) – producer, executive-producer, engineering, keyboards and macintosh (3–5, 7, 8, 10), vocals (3, 8, 9), programming (11)
- Christian Petke (as Count 0) – producer, engineering, singing and macintosh (3–5, 7, 9, 11), keyboards (9), illustrations

Additional performers

- Holger Bartel – guitar (9)
- Kay Dolores – bass guitar (9, 11)
- Warren Harrison (War-N Harrison) – drums (11)
- Nial McGaughey – guitar (7, 10)
- Bernie Moon – drums (11)
- Mike Welch – guitar (3, 4, 5, 8), vocals (3, 8, 9)

Production and design

- Stefan Noltemeyer – mastering

== Release history ==
| Region | Date | Label | Format | Catalog |
|---|---|---|---|---|
| United States | 1997 | COP Int'l | CD | COP 028/29 |
