= Android Lust discography =

American rock band discography

- Studio albums: 5
- Soundtrack albums: 1
- Singles: 2
- Music videos: 3
- Remix albums: 2
- Other Appearances: 1

The discography of Android Lust, an industrial rock band from United States, consists of 6 studio albums, 2 remix albums and 2 singles.

== Demo albums ==
- Foreign Body (1996)

== Studio albums ==
Year	Album details
1998	Resolution: Released: 3 March 1998; Label: Tinman Records; Format: CD
2003	The Dividing: Released: 23 July 2003; Label: Dark Vision Media; Format: CD
2006	Devour, Rise and Take Flight: Released: February 2006; Label: Projekt Records; Format: CD
2010	The Human Animal: Released: 10 August 2010; Label: Synthellec Music; Format: CD
2013	Crater Vol. 1: Released: 29 January 2013; Label: Synthellec Music; Format: CD
2017	Berlin // Crater V2: Released: 18 August 2017; Label: Synthellec Music; Format: CD

== Remix albums ==
Year	Album details	Notes
1999	Evolution: Released: 1 May 1999; Label: Tinman Records; Format: CD	#18 CMJ RPM Charts
2004	Stripped and Stitched: Released: 5 August 2004; Label: Projekt Records; Format: CD	

== Singles/EPs ==
- The Want (2001, Dark Vision Media) - #29 CMJ RPM Charts
- Dragonfly (2005, Project Records)

== Other recordings ==
- Ringworm v.1 - Cherished Agony (Last Drops) - Tinman Records
- Awake the Machines 2 - Where Angels Lie (Writhing) - Out of Line Records
- The Unquiet Grave - Heathen (A Thousand Thoughts) - Cleopatra Records
- Empire One - Refuse, Where Angels Lie, Soviet (colder) - Tinman Records
- Awake the Machines - Suffer the Flesh - Out of Line Records
- Tentacles of Submission - No Going Back - Psykoziz Records
- Diva X Machina - Down - C.O.P. International
- Projekt Sampler - 2005.1 - Sin - Projekt Records
- doors & windows - Monstrum Sepsis - dsc (remix by shikhee) - WTII Records
- NCIS: The Official TV Soundtrack - Hole Solution - CBS Records

== Remixes ==
Year	Song	Artist	Album	Notes
1998	"Disheveled Star (Rebirth)"	The Aggression	Pure Liquid Ego	
1998	"Soviet (Colder)"	Crocodile Shop	Soviet	
2000	"Skeleton Key (Osmosis)"	I, Parasite	Horseslayer EP	
2004	"DSC"	Monstrum Sepsis	Doors & Windows	
2004	"Not Unique (Android Lust Mix)"	Aïboforcen	Kafarnaüm	
