= Arterial Spray & Cattle Mutilations =

Studio album by Alien Faktor
- Released: 4 November 1997
- Studio: The Womb Studio (Milwaukee, WI)
- Genre: Industrial
- Length: 47:39
- Label: Decibel
- Producer: Tom Muschitz

Alien Faktor chronology
Listen! (1996)	Arterial Spray & Cattle Mutilations (1997)

Arterial Spray & Cattle Mutilations is the fourth and final studio album by Alien Faktor, released on 4 November 1997 by Decibel.

== Reception ==
Larry Miles of Black Monday was somewhat positive in his reception of Arterial Spray & Cattle Mutilations, saying "there is a anthemic quality to arterial spray, but this becomes lost in danceable repetitiveness of textures and abhorrent lyrics found throughout." Andrew Lewandowski of Chronicles of Chaos awarded the album seven out of ten and called it "a harshly disturbing jaunt through the abysses which separate one synapse from another in a mind tormented by neurosis and psychosis." Chris Best of Lollipop Magazine praised the mainstream direction the band embraced. A critic for Sonic Boom gave the album a positive review and said "for the first time Alien Faktor has a musically cohesive release so listeners no longer have to endure a sometimes jarring genre change between tracks."

== Track listing ==
All tracks are written by Tom Muschitz.

No.	Title	Length
1.	"Drained of Fluids"	4:07
2.	"Ants, Sheep, Drunks and Whores"	4:03
3.	"Liber Hate"	4:57
4.	"The Divine Molestation"	4:54
5.	"Afterbirth"	3:46
6.	"Love Under Will"	5:19
7.	"V"	0:31
8.	"Zombie March"	3:51
9.	"Attrition"	4:49
10.	"Ten Kingdoms"	4:40
11.	"Unhealthy Associations"	3:24
12.	"The Power of the Bullet"	3:19

== Accolades ==
Year	Publication	Country	Accolade	Rank
1997	CMJ New Music Monthly	United States	"Dance Top 25"	20
"*" denotes an unordered list.

== Personnel ==
Adapted from the Arterial Spray & Cattle Mutilations liner notes.

Alien Faktor

- Mike Hunsberger – guitar, programming
- Tom Muschitz – vocals, programming, production, engineering, mixing, mastering, design

Additional musicians

- Chris Randall – vocals and programming (3)
- Brian Sarche – guitar (3)
- Scott Sturgis – programming (6)

Production and design

- James Barany – painting
- Lars Hansen – assistant vocal engineering
- Bob Ross – design
- Karl Schlei – photography

== Release history ==
Region	Date	Label	Format	Catalog
United States	1997	Decibel	CD	DEC019
