= Alien Faktor =

American musical group

- Origin: Milwaukee, Wisconsin, United States
- Genre: Industrial
- Years active: 1994–present
- Label: decibel
- Members: Thomas L. Muschitz
- Past members: Mike Hunsberger

Alien Faktor are an American electro-industrial group based in Madison, Wisconsin, United States. Created as a solo musical project by multi-instrumentalist Thomas L. Muschitz, alien faktor was influenced by EBM, soundtrack and industrial music. The band released four studio albums for decibel: abduction (1994), Desolate (1995), Listen! (1996) and Arterial Spray… & Cattle Mutilations (1997).

== History ==
Alien Faktor began in 1991 as a solo musical project for Tom Muschitz out of Milwaukee. In 1994 Muschitz created the record label Decibel which the made its debut with Alien Faktor's Abduction album. Its compositions were informed by soundtrack and electronic dance music. They followed up with a second album in 1995 titled Desolate that received praise for its stylistic variety. Alien Faktor's third and fourth albums were released in 1996 and titled Final Expenses and Listen! respectively by Decibel. Final Expenses contains remixes and several new tracks while Listen consists of four lengthy loosely structured compositions.

In 1997 Mike Hunsberger joined on guitars and programming to release the band's fifth and final album Arterial Spray & Cattle Mutilations on Decibel. Keyboardist Lars Hansen from Oneiroid Psychosis participated during live touring. In February of the following year the album peaked at position twenty on CMJ's Dance Top 25. In 1999 the band covered Alanis Morissette's "You Oughta Know" for the various artists compilation Nod's Tacklebox o' Fun, released by Re-Constriction Records.

In October 2026, Muschitz announced the impending release of Stockholm Syndrome, his first album in 29 years. The introductory album single, "Hanging By a Threat", was released on Bandcamp on October 27th.

== Discography ==
Studio albums

- Abduction (1994, Decibel)
- Desolate (1995, Decibel)
- Listen! (1996, Decibel)
- Arterial Spray & Cattle Mutilations (1997, Decibel)

EPs & Singles

- Final Expenses (1996, Decibel)
- "Hanging By a Threat" (2026, self-released)

Other

- Sinking (Alien Faktor Remix) - Krushed Opiates (2025, Multipass)
