= Cybrid (album) =

Studio album by Deathline International
- Released: June 5, 2001
- Genre: Industrial rock; EBM
- Length: 43:12
- Label: COP Intl.
- Producer: Maurice Jackson; Christian Petke

Deathline International chronology
Wild Boys (1997)	Cybrid (2001)	Eisbär (2016)

Cybrid is the fourth studio album by Deathline International, released on June 5, 2001, by COP International. The album peaked at No. 17 on the CMJ RPM Charts in the U.S.

== Reception ==
CMJ described the music of Cybrid as "dark, mechanized dance beats topped with abrasive industrial noise" and exclaimed "it's all here: random samples that sound like they're from Subgenius meditation tapes, distorted back-of-the-throat shouting, factory-floor beats, chunky guitars...and melodic keyboards." Jean Battiato of KSJS listed the album as one of his top picks for CMJ New Music Report in 2001. Industrial Reviews gave the album two stars out of five and criticized the slower tempo compositions while noting that more success was achieved with the faster-paced dance songs. The New Empire said "Cybrid contains 11 tracks with club-potential" and "powerful beats are dominating the sound and sometimes Detahline Int'l becomes a real European EBM-touch" StarVox Music Zine said the music represents a "delightful rebirth of the concept of strong vocals and the (re)affirmations that EBM industrial programming and guitars can coexist" and "the only shortcomings of the album was that there was almost too much of a rigidity in percussiveness and in sound composition."

== Track listing ==
All tracks are written by Maurice Jackson and Christian Petke, except "Paradise City" by Steven Adler, Duff McKagan, Axl Rose and Slash and Izzy Stradlin.

No.	Title	Length
1.	"Destroy"	4:20
2.	"Can You Feel It"	3:29
3.	"You Kill Me"	3:41
4.	"He's in My Head"	4:08
5.	"Paradise City" (Guns N' Roses cover)	4:12
6.	"Outcast"	3:37
7.	"Falling From Grace"	4:29
8.	"Iron Rain"	3:47
9.	"Feuer"	3:43
10.	"Liquid Dreams"	3:57
11.	"You Pull the Trigger"	3:49

== Personnel ==
Adapted from the Cybrid liner notes.

Deathline International

- Eric Gottesman – guitar
- Maurice Jackson (as M.O.) – vocals, keyboards, programming, producer, additional engineering
- Steve Lam (as Slam) – synthesizer, guitar, additional producer
- Marisa Lenhardt – soprano vocals
- Nikki Soandso (as Nik[e]) – live engineering
- Christian Petke (as The Count [0]) – vocals, keyboards, programming, producer, engineering

Additional performers

- G.W. Childs – drums, keyboards
- Corey Gunderson (The_Gun) – keyboards
- Nial McGaughey – guitar
- Ryan Paul – guitar
- Jay Tye – vocals
- Steve Watkins – electronics, drums

Production and design

- Steph Dumais – cover art
- Stefan Noltemeyer – mastering

== Release history ==
Region	Date	Label	Format	Catalog
United States	2001	COP Int'l	CD	COP 062
