= Breaking (EP) =

EP by Deathline International
- Released: November 29, 2019
- Genre: Electro-industrial
- Length: 18:57
- Label: COP Intl./Distortion
- Producer: John Fryer

Deathline International chronology
Spin Zone (2018)	Breaking (2019)	Spin Zone II (2020)

Breaking is an EP by Deathline International, released on November 29, 2019 by COP International and Distortion Productions.

== Track listing ==
All tracks are written by G.W. Childs, Steve Lam and Christian Petke.

No.	Title	Length
1.	"Breaking" (John Fryer Mix)	4:14
2.	"Breaking" (Marc Heal/MC Lord of the Flies Mix)	5:36
3.	"Breaking" (unitcode:machine Mix)	4:14
4.	"Breaking" (Probe 7 Remix)	4:53

== Personnel ==
Adapted from the Lip Service liner notes.

Deathline International

- G.W. Childs – programming
- Steve Lam (as SLam) – programming
- Christian Petke (as Th3Count) – vocals, programming

Additional performers

- John Fryer – programming, producer, engineering
- Angela Goodman – backing vocals
- James Perry – guitar, backing vocals
- Steve Watkins – cymbal

== Release history ==
Region	Date	Label	Format	Catalog
United States	2019	COP Int'l/Distortion	CD, DL	DSTPRO 005
