= Distance (Battery album) =

Studio album by Battery
- Released: 1996
- Recorded: November 1995–February 1996
- Studio: Fringe Studios (Oakland, CA)
- Genre: Electro-industrial
- Length: 51:40
- Label: COP Intl.
- Producer: Shawn Brice, Christian Petke

Battery chronology
nv (1995)	Distance (1996)	Aftermath (1998)

Professional ratings
Review scores
Source	Rating
Allmusic	4/5 stars

Distance is the third studio album by Battery, released in 1996 by COP International.

== Track listing ==
All tracks are written by Maria Azevedo, Shawn Brice and Evan Sornstein, except "Gangsta's Paradise" by Stevie Wonder, Coolio, Doug Rasheed, Larry Sanders.

No.	Title	Length
1.	"Bellarmine"	4:36
2.	"Gangsta's Paradise" (Coolio & L.V. cover)	4:47
3.	"Transit"	4:13
4.	"Repress"	3:06
5.	"Hush"	3:56
6.	"Redeemable"	3:24
7.	"Silence"	2:43
8.	"Warm"	4:03
9.	"Access"	3:32
10.	"A Fate Like This"	2:47
11.	"Sirens"	5:26
12.	"The Other Child"	1:54
13.	"This Hideous Strength"	7:08

CD bonus tracks
No.	Title	Length
20.	"No Release"	2:07
21.	"Ostrich"	4:17
22.	"Access" (Dot Com remix)	3:56
23.	"Further Up, Further In" (demo)	2:15
24.	"Distance"	4:00

Notes

- Tracks 14–19 consist of a few seconds of silence each.

== Personnel ==
Adapted from the Distance liner notes.

Battery

- Maria Azevedo – lead vocals, instruments
- Shawn Brice – instruments, production, engineering, mixing
- Evan Sornstein – instruments

Additional musicians

- Darren Johnson – backing vocals (1)
- Kim Xn – effects (6)

Production and design

- Curium Design – photography, design
- Christian Petke – production, engineering, mixing, backing vocals (3)
- Stefan Noltemeyer – mastering

== Release history ==
Region	Date	Label	Format	Catalog
United States	1996	COP Intl.	CD	COP 021
