= Venus Mind Trap =

EP by Deathline International
- Released: April 16, 1995
- Studio: Fringe Studios (Oakland, California)
- Genre: Industrial rock; industrial metal
- Length: 17:03
- Label: COP Intl.
- Producer: Shawn Brice; Christian Petke

Deathline International chronology
Reality (1993)	Venus Mind Trap (1995)	Zarathoustra (1995)

Venus Mind Trap is an EP by Deathline International, released on April 16, 1995, by COP International.

== Track listing ==
All tracks are written by Shawn Brice and Christian Petke, except "Rawhide" by Dimitri Tiomkin and Ned Washington.

No.	Title	Length
1.	"War Chant Ma$chine"	3:37
2.	"Generation Fantome"	3:27
3.	"Walk With Me"	3:53
4.	"Open Your Eyes"	4:00
5.	"Rawhide" (Frankie Laine cover)	2:06

== Personnel ==
Adapted from the Venus Mind Trap liner notes.

Deathline International

- Shawn Brice (as Wiz Art) – vocals, producer, engineering
- Christian Petke (as Count Zero) – vocals, producer, engineering, cover art

Additional performers

- John Carson – bass guitar
- Rey Osburn – guitar, backing vocals
- Suzanne Santos – vocals
- Evan Sornstein (Curium Design) – saxophone, cover art

Production and design

- Gunnar Seeling – photography

== Release history ==
Region	Date	Label	Format	Catalog
United States	1993	COP Int'l	CD	COP 006
