= Nv (album) =

nv

Studio album by Battery
- Released: May 1995
- Genre: Electro-industrial
- Length: 72:47
- Label: COP Intl.
- Producer: Battery, Christian Petke

Battery chronology
Lilith 3.2 (1994)	nv (1995)	Distance (1996)

Professional ratings
Review scores
Source	Rating
Allmusic	3/5 stars

nv is the second studio album by Battery, released in May 1995 by COP International.

== Track listing ==
All tracks are written by Maria Azevedo, Shawn Brice and Evan Sornstein, except "Shame" by Martin Gore.

No.	Title	Length
1.	"Nevermore"	4:40
2.	"Electric Motor Burn"	3:04
3.	"Shame"	3:28
4.	"Flesh & Blood"	0:26
5.	"Mind-Killer"	2:34
6.	"Go"	4:06
7.	"Pax Neurotica"	3:45
8.	"Digital Angel"	3:16
9.	"Manipulator"	3:48
10.	"Guilt"	3:24
11.	"Envious"	3:03
12.	"Dollhouse"	3:36
13.	"Deluge"	4:23
14.	"Carry Over Heaven"	3:37

CD bonus tracks
No.	Title	Length
15.	"Silence"	3:54
16.	"Uranium"	4:07
17.	"Melting"	2:52
18.	"Found+Lost"	0:37
19.	"http://www:wasted@time.com/anger"	2:05
20.	"The Death of Cain"	0:55
21.	"Distance Within"	5:23
22.	"Big Switch"	1:20
23.	"Go" (Screwdriver mix)	4:24

== Personnel ==
Adapted from the nv liner notes.

Battery

- Maria Azevedo – lead vocals, instruments
- Shawn Brice – instruments, engineering
- Evan Sornstein – instruments

Production and additional personnel

- Battery – production, engineering, mixing
- Curium Design – photography, design
- Christian Petke – production, engineering, mixing

== Release history ==
Region	Date	Label	Format	Catalog
United States	1996	COP Intl.	CD	COP 016
