= Spin Zone II =

EP by Deathline International
- Released: April 17, 2020
- Genre: Electro-industrial
- Length: 22:41
- Label: Distortion
- Producer: John Fryer

Deathline International chronology
Breaking (2019)	Spin Zone II (2020)

Spin Zone II is an EP by Deathline International, released on April 17, 2020 by Distortion Productions.

== Track listing ==
All tracks are written by G.W. Childs, Steve Lam, James Perry and Christian Petke.

No.	Title	Length
1.	"Spin Zone" (Solemn Assembly Mix)	4:44
2.	"Spin Zone" (16 Volt Mix)	3:13
3.	"Spin Zone" (Tragic Impulse Mix)	3:50
4.	"Spin Zone" (GW4 No Rhythm Denied Remix)	4:05
5.	"Spin Zone" (Stoneburner Remix)	3:23
6.	"Spin Zone" (Red Lokust Remix)	3:23

== Personnel ==
Adapted from the Spin Zone II liner notes.

Deathline International

- Steve Lam (as SLam) – programming, guitars, backing vocals
- James Perry – guitars, backing vocals
- Christian Petke (as Th3Count) – vocals, programming, vocals

Additional performers

- Angela Goodman – backing vocals

Production and design

- John Fryer – producer, engineering

== Release history ==
Region	Date	Label	Format	Catalog
United States	2020	Distortion	CD, DL	DSTPRO 006
