= Induktion, Varianz und Deren Folgen =

Compilation album
- Released: 1993
- Genre: Industrial
- Label: Kugelblitz

Induktion, Varianz und Deren Folgen ("Induction, Variance and Their Consequences") is the compilation CD released in 1993 featuring Extended play releases for four electro-industrial acts. Most notably, the compilation appearance of Suicide Commando led to their later signing with Off Beat.

== History ==
Induktion, Varianz und Deren Folgen was compiled by Stefan Herwig on his own label Kugelblitz Records. The compilation features EP's by four bands on one CD. Each EP has its own title, and the CD cover is designed with 4 different images (one for each band) so that any one of the images can be used as the cover. This four-EP CD format was later used by Off Beat records for their "The O Files" compilations when Stefan Herwig became A&R manager for that label, and also has inspired similar products in the electro-industrial genre such as ""Quadrophobia"" and "Vier Factor".

== Track listing ==
Suicide Commando – Never Get Out

1. Take My God Away
2. Never Get Out
3. The Ultimate Machine
4. Never Get Out (Insecticided)

Genital A-Tech – Technologies

1. Technology
2. Beat Me
3. Aus Lauter Liebe

Digital Slaughter – N-Lost

1. Strain
2. Narkotikum
3. Apathy
4. Determined
5. N-Lost

Dementia Simplex – Anxiety E.P.

1. Cinderchild
2. Immune Deficiency (Reincarnation)
3. Bugbear
4. Hollow Moon
