= Absolute Body Control =

Belgian electronic music project

- Origin: Belgium
- Genres: EBM; synthpop; industrial
- Years active: 1979–1984, 2006–present
- Labels: Body; VUZ; Daft
- Spinoffs: Dive; Klinik; Sonar
- Members: Dirk Ivens; Eric Van Wonterghem

Absolute Body Control is an electronic music project from Belgium. It is notable as the first significant project of musicians Dirk Ivens and Eric Van Wonterghem.

== History ==
Having previously played in minor punk and new wave bands, Dirk formed Absolute Body Control as a project more influenced by the prototype synthpop sound being produced by the likes of Suicide and D.A.F. The project originally feature Marc De Jonghe (synths) and Veerle De Schepper (backing vocals), though Mark was replaced in 1981 by Eric Van Wonterghem.

The project released a number of cassettes, but only one 7" (Is There An Exit?) and no studio albums during its brief initial run. Through their connection with Sandy Nijs - sometimes collaborator and, later, founding member of The Klinik - and his involvement in the international cassette trading network, Absolute Body Control gained more of a following outside of Belgium. Through these connections, Absolute Body Control received an offer to tour Norway in 1985.

Dirk and Eric later joined forces with Marc Verhaeghen in The Klinik, and the duo of Ivens and Van Wonterghem would later collaborate on a number of other projects, most notably Sonar.

A compilation of Absolute Body Control tracks entitled 'Eat This' was eventually released in 1993. A more comprehensive 2CD compilation 'Lost/Found' was issued in 2005. A 5-LP box set of all their cassette releases followed in 2007. Dirk and Eric also took the project back on stage in 2006 and continue to tour with the project.

In 2007, 22 years after splitting up, Absolute Body Control re-formed and released Wind[Re]Wind, which contains newly recorded versions of select older tracks alongside the new EP "Never Seen", including a remix by The Horrorist. Two new recordings were released in 2010, Shattered Illusion & Sorrow. In 2011 came the album Mindless Intrusion & Surrender No Resistance with remix by the French project Millimetric (a.k.a. François-Xavier Michel of Binär Code and Digital Blood). Later in 2011, the band did a European festival tour with dates in Belgium, the UK, Germany, Norway, and Poland.

2013 saw the project remix tracks by post-punk/electro-wave band Section 25, namely "Microgroove" on the "Invicta Max" 10" and "Beating Heart" on the 2013 remix CD "Eigengrau".

== Discography ==
=== Cassettes ===
- Absolute Body Control (1981)
- Numbers (1982)
- Figures (1983)
- Live (1984)
- Tracks (1984)

=== Singles ===
- Is There An Exit? (1981)

=== Albums ===
- Shattered Illusion (2010)

=== Extended plays ===
- Never Seen (2008)
- Sorrow (2010)
- Surrender No Resistance (2011)
- Waving Hands (2015)
- Slow Action (2018)
- A New Dawn (2021)

=== Compilations ===
- Eat This CD (VUZ/Subtronic 1993)
- Lost/Found 2CD (Tarantulla Productions 2005)
- Various Artists: The Lost Tapes LP (Minimal Wave 2006)
- Tapes 81-89 5LP (Vinyl On Demand 2007)
- Wind[Re]Wind LP (Minimal Maximal 2007 - ltd to 500 copies - features re-recorded versions)
- Mindless Intrusion LP (Minimal Maximal 2011)
- Forbidden Games CD/LP (Turntable Sounds / Sleepless Records 2016)
