= Abduction (album) =

Studio album by Alien Faktor
- Released: 1994
- Genre: Industrial
- Length: 73:42
- Label: Decibel

Alien Faktor chronology
Abduction (1994)	Desolate (1995)

Abduction is the debut studio album of Alien Faktor, released in 1994 by Decibel.

== Reception ==
Professional ratings
Review scores
Source	Rating
Allmusic	3/5 stars

John Bush of Allmusic awarded Abduction three out of five possible stars, saying "Thomas Muschitz blends soundtrack-inspired music with electronic dance on this Decibel release." Sonic Boom praised the use of musical cacophony and diversity of the album.

== Track listing ==
All tracks are written by Tom Muschitz.

No.	Title	Length
1.	"Murder"	5:15
2.	"Cranium"	4:57
3.	"Somewhere in the Dark"	3:51
4.	"Afterlife"	5:06
5.	"Guilt"	6:00
6.	"Project Pain"	5:41
7.	"1970"	4:14
8.	"Carrier"	6:35
9.	"Blackice"	4:10
10.	"Transexpress"	4:07
11.	"Cranium" (Core – Sample mix)	4:37
12.	"Blood"	2:37
13.	"BLIP"	3:10
14.	"Kill Me"	3:51
15.	"The Killing Floor"	9:29

== Personnel ==
Adapted from the Abduction liner notes.

Alien Faktor

- Tom Muschitz – vocals, programming, arrangements, engineering, mixing

Additional musicians

- Tom Crawford – arrangements
- Kevin Gayton – vocals (6)
- Mike Hunsberger – guitar (2, 8, 11, 14), programming (14), sampler (14)
- Terry Reed (as Warlock) – vocals and engineering (3)
- Jordan Trais – Roland TB-303 (11)

Production and design

- Guy Aitchison – cover art, painting
- Matt Hawley – design

== Release history ==
Region	Date	Label	Format	Catalog
United States	1994	Decibel	CD	DEC001
