= Dirk Ivens =

Belgian musician

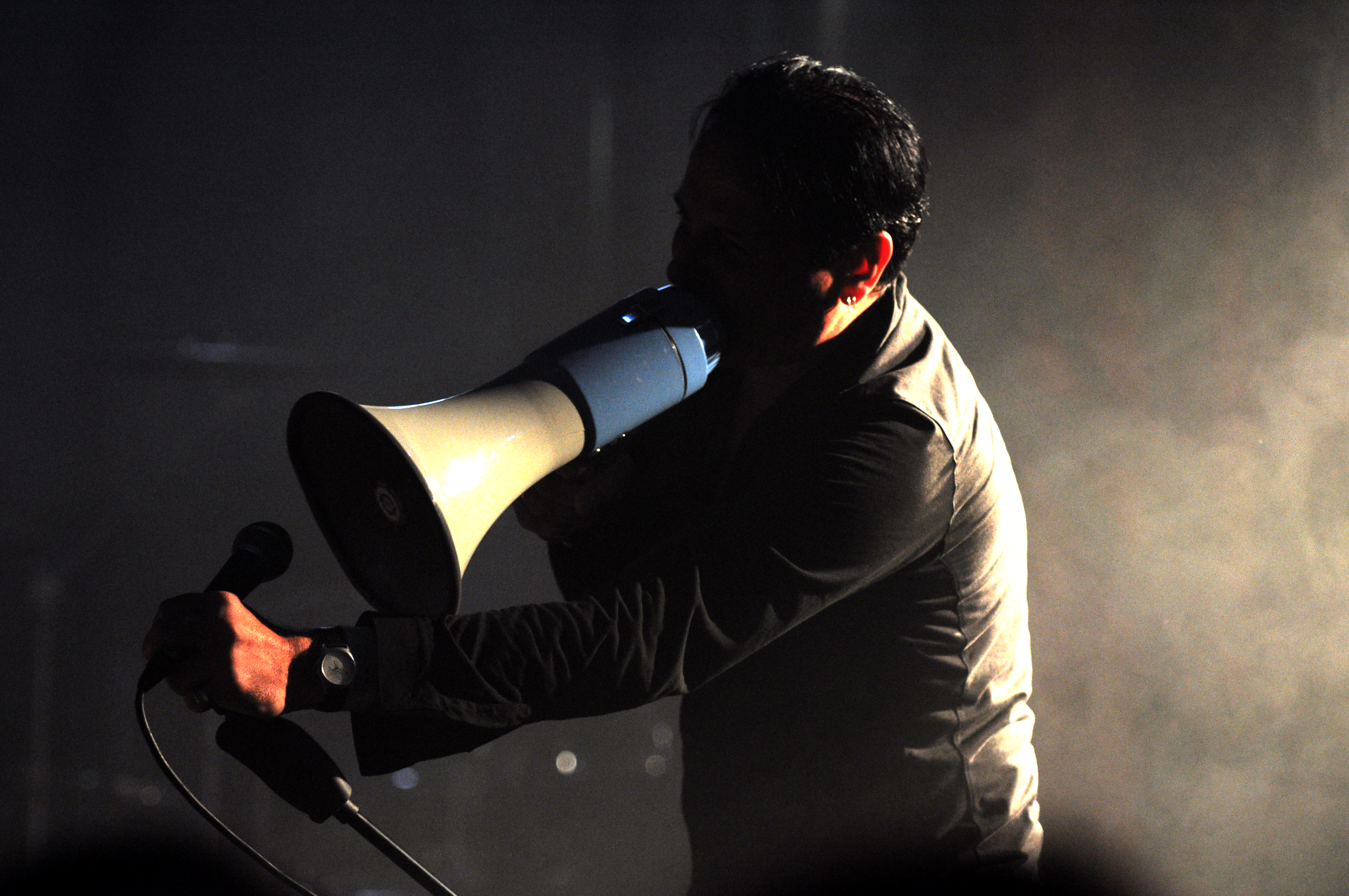
- Dirk Ivens with his project Dive at e-tropolis 2014, Oberhausen, Germany

Background information
- Origin: Belgium
- Genres: Electronic; electro-industrial; rhythmic noise; EBM
- Years active: 1978–present
- Website: Dirk Ivens official website

Dirk Ivens is a Belgian musician and performer in the industrial music genre.

== Career ==
In 1978 he started as singer and guitar player in the punk band Slaughterhouse but left the group after one year to form the new band The Few. In 1980 he formed the electronic band Absolute Body Control, influenced by Suicide, DAF, and British artists like Fad Gadget. After going through various members, Absolute Body Control soon settled as a duo with Ivens and Eric van Wonterghem.

In 1985, Absolute Body Control joined forces with Marc Verhaeghen's band The Klinik and Sandy Nys' The Maniacs to form the "supergroup" Absolute Controlled Clinical Maniacs. The name was soon shortened to The Klinik; Nys left in 1986 and van Wonterghem in 1987 to work on their own bands, while Ivens remained a member until 1991, when he left to concentrate on his solo project Dive which had numerous releases the following 15 years.

Also in 1996, Dirk started Sonar together with Patrick Stevens, who left in 1998 to be replaced by long-time collaborator (and brother-in-law) Eric van Wonterghem. In 2003-2005 he rejoined Marc Verhaeghen in The Klinik for a few festival concerts, without releasing any new material.

== Record labels ==
In the early eighties, Ivens founded Body Records initially as a vehicle for releasing Absolute Body Control music (hence the name "Body"). After starting with The Klinik, Ivens started receiving unsolicited submissions from groups around the world which he used to create and release compilations. Through Klinik's label association with Antler Records, Ivens secured a distribution deal to license Body Records releases which did not prove lucrative.

In the meantime, Ivens continued to receive submissions from bands, but feeling that the deal with Antler was not viable he decided to begin a new label, Daft Records. Under Daft, Ivens released his solo output as Dive, as well as Esplendor Geometrico, Master/Slave Relationship, and Hybryds among others.

Ivens also worked for the Belgian KK Records label and had close contacts with Ivan Iusco's Minus Habens label in Italy.

== Discography ==
=== Collaborations/split releases ===
- Fuck, Rinse, Repeat / Burn digital Single with Jenn Vix (self released by Jenn Vix, 2013)
- Go (Bring It) Back single-sided 12" with Agent Side Grinder (Kollaps Records, 2014)
