= Desolate (album) =

Studio album by Alien Faktor
- Released: 1995
- Studio: The Womb Studio (Milwaukee, WI)
- Genre: Industrial
- Length: 52:30
- Label: Decibel
- Producer: Tom Muschitz

Alien Faktor chronology
Abduction (1994)	Desolate (1995)	Final Expenses (1996)

Desolate is the second studio album by American electro-industrial group Alien Faktor, released in 1995 by Decibel.

== Reception ==
A critic for Sonic Boom praised Desolate appreciated the musical diversity of the album and said "each track depicts a single discrete scene but listened to as a whole the listener can begin to appreciate the full effect of the experience."

== Track listing ==
All lyrics are written by Tom Muschitz, except "Dysphoria" by Leif Hansen; all music is composed by Tom Muschitz.

No.	Title	Length
1.	"No One Can Make Me Do Anything I Don't Want to Do Anyway"	2:32
2.	"Ego Death"	4:09
3.	"Ocean Space"	10:36
4.	"Ode to Fetus"	3:12
5.	"Dysphoria"	4:33
6.	"Termites and Maggots"	5:21
7.	"Obey"	4:29
8.	"Blip 3 in 3D"	5:19
9.	"Monkey Business"	1:50
10.	"The Perpetual Machine"	1:41
11.	"Dirge"	4:28
12.	"Volt Meter (See You Next Tuesday)"	4:20

== Personnel ==
Adapted from the Desolate liner notes.

Alien Faktor

- Tom Muschitz – vocals, programming, production, engineering, recording, mixing, mastering

Additional musicians

- Peter Balestrieri – saxophone (3)
- Lars Hansen – vocals and programming (5),
- Leif Hansen – programming (5)
- Mike Hunsberger – guitar (6, 7), sampler (2)
- Dan Kucza – guitar (1)
- Karl J. Paloucek – fretless bass (1)
- Terry Reed (as Warlock) – vocals and arrangements (3)
- Bill Stace – drums (7)

Production and design

- Daniel Streng – cover art, design

== Release history ==
Region	Date	Label	Format	Catalog
United States	1995	Decibel	CD	DEC005
