= Dive (Belgian band) =

Belgian electronic body music project

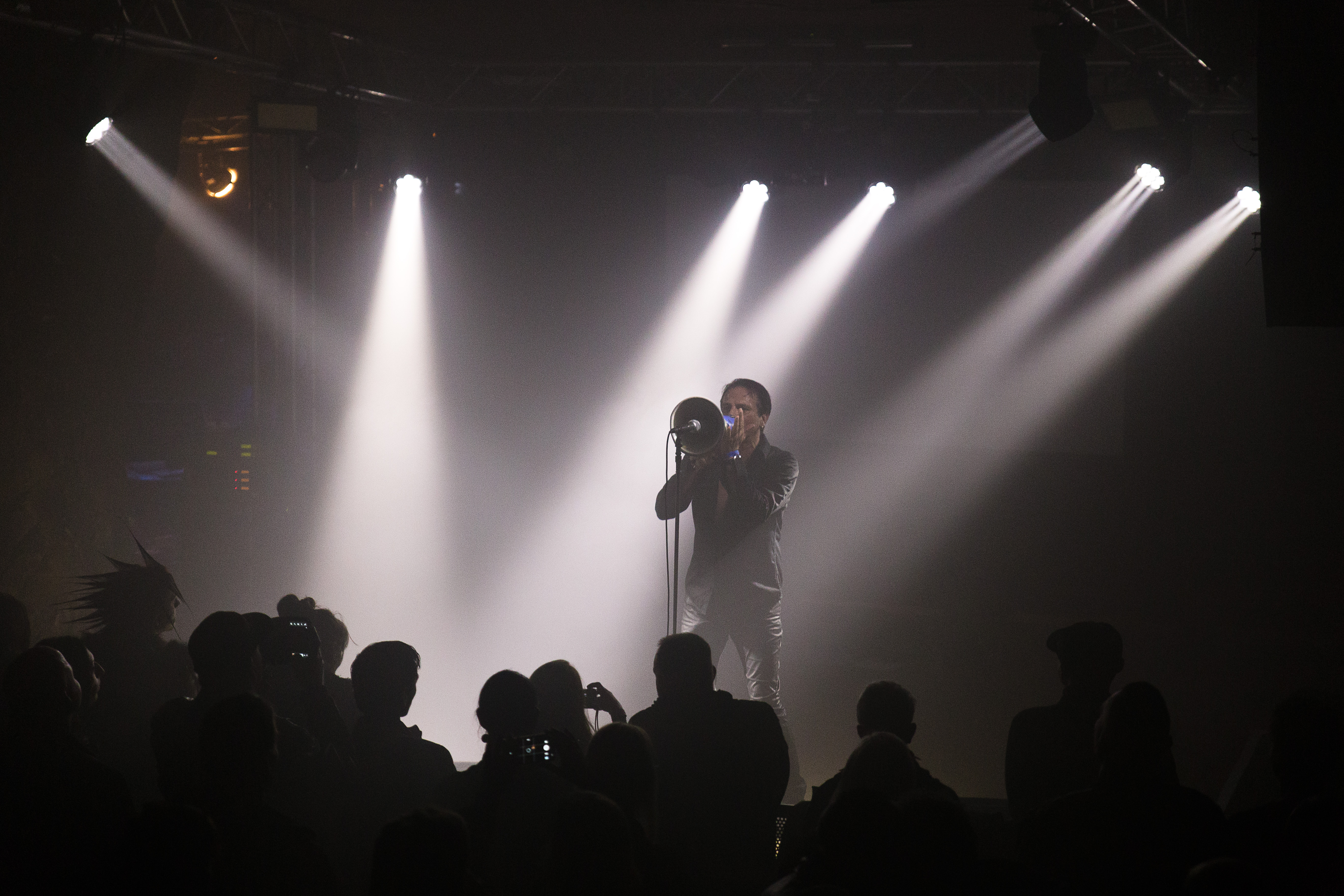
- Dive at the Kasematten-Festival 2016 in Germany

Background information
- Origin: Belgium
- Genres: Electronic body music; electro-industrial; noise
- Years active: 1990–present
- Labels: Daft; Minus Habens; Out Of Line; Body
- Spinoffs: Sonar
- Spinoff of: Klinik; Absolute Body Control
- Members: Dirk Ivens; Ivan Iusco
- Website: Dive official website

Dive is a Belgian electronic body music project formed in 1990 by Dirk Ivens (Absolute Body Control, Klinik, Blok 57, Sonar). Dive's "audio trademark" is the experimental sound of abused drum machines, pulsating through crackling distortion on almost every song.

== History ==
Dirk Ivens began Dive as a solo project in 1990 during the waning days of his participation in the band Klinik. With Dive, Dirk sought to have complete control over his creative process as a change from his many previous years working with bands. Dive as a musical concept was intended to project a far more minimal presence, not only in terms of the equipment and sounds produced, but in live performances as well; Dirk performs on stage with just himself and his recordings and minimal visual presentation.

The earliest Dive works were produced with only a rhythm machine and several effects units that, together, produced rhythmic, distorted noise tracks overlain with Dirk's vocals - always processed, sometimes distorted. The overall presentation was that of "noise as noise" with instructions in the liner notes that the music was "to be played at maximum volume." With the release of Snakedressed, Dive took on a more club-friendly sound with a wider sonic palette and less pronounced distortion.

Although explicitly a solo project of Ivens', Dirk has worked numerous times in the studio with composer and Minus Habens label founder Ivan Iusco. Several tracks included in the albums Concrete Jungle, Snakedressed, True Lies and Underneath are written and produced by Ivan. Rafael M. Espinosa of Geistform also produced several tracks for Behind The Sun and Underneath. The latest album "Where Do We Go From Here?" was made in collaboration with Jan Dewulf (Your Life On Hold and Diskonnekted). It is available as regular CD and as a wooden box, limited to 500 copies, including the album on vinyl, the CD and an exclusive vinyl EP with extended versions and remixes from Numb and Suicide Commando.

Dive's live performances have always remained a solo effort.

== Discography ==
=== Albums ===
- Dive LP (Body Records 1990)
- First Album CD (Minus Habens Records 1992; Dive LP with bonus tracks)
- Live Action CD (Daft 1992)
- Inside Out LP (Hard Records 1993; limited to 1000 copies. Contains tracks from previous EPs)
- Concrete Jungle CD (Minus Habens Records 1993)
- No Pain - No Game CD (Discordia 1994)
- Box 2CD (Discordia 1995; 'First Album' with 'Final Report', 'Images' and 'Live Action')
- Grinding Walls CD (Daft 1995; Soundtrack)
- Scraping Tokyo '95 CD (Gift Records 1995; Live)
- Snakedressed CD (Daft/COP International 1997)
- No Pain - No Game + Reported 2CD (Triton 1998)
- True Lies CD (Daft/Cop International 1999) – #20 CMJ RPM Charts, U.S.
- Behind the Sun CD (Daft 2004)
- Through the Night CD (Q-Code 2006; Anthology 1990 - 2005, Limited to 1000 copies)
- Are You Real 3CD (Rustblade 2007; Box set limited to 100 copies, consisting of No Pain - No Game, Behind the Sun and additional live CD)
- Underneath CD (Out of Line 2017)
- Live Razzmatazz LP/Digital (Mecanica 2017; Live)
- Live Maschinenfest 2017 Cass/Digital (Raubbau 2018; Live)
- Where Do We Go From Here? (Out Of Line, 2020)

=== Singles and EPs ===
- Final Report MLP/MCD (Minus Habens Records 1992)
- Broken Meat CDS (Minus Habens Records 1992)
- Images MCD/Book (Minus Habens Records 1993)
- Extended Play MCD (Discordia 1994)
- Reported MCD (Daft/Fifth Colvmn Records 1996)
- Reported Picture LP (Ant-Zen 1996)
- Two Faced Man CDS/Picture 7" (Daft/Triton 1999)
- Dive Mix 12" (Minus Habens Records 1999)
- Lies in Your Eyes MCD/12" (Daft/Pflichtkauf 2002)
- Let Me In 12"/Digital (Out Of Line 2018)

=== Collaborations/split releases ===
- Obsession EP with Kirlian Camera (Discordia 1995; re-released on Triton 1998)
- Night Shadows CD (Fast Forward 1996, split CD with Controlled Bleeding)
- Frozen CD with Diskonnekted (Alfa Matrix 2006) – #6 German Alternative Charts (DAC), Germany
