= Aftermath (Battery album) =

Studio album by Battery
- Released: March 11, 1998
- Recorded: April – November 1998
- Studio: The Pit (Oakland, CA)
- Genre: Electro-industrial
- Length: 63:51
- Label: COP Intl.
- Producer: Battery

Battery chronology
Distance (1996)	Aftermath (1998)	Momentum (1998)

Professional ratings
Review scores
Source	Rating
Allmusic	3/5 stars

Aftermath is the fourth studio album by Battery, released on March 11, 1998, by COP International. The album peaked at No. 14 on the CMJ RPM Charts.

== Track listing ==
All tracks are written by Maria Azevedo, Shawn Brice and Evan Sornstein.

No.	Title	Length
1.	"Aftermath"	3:51
2.	"Betrayal 3.0"	4:05
3.	"This Much 2.0"	4:03
4.	"Pity"	5:27
5.	"Theme 3.0"	4:47
6.	"Strike"	3:50
7.	"Never Left"	5:06
8.	"Last of August"	5:20
9.	"Wist"	5:46
10.	"All Cats Are Grey"	18:44
11.	"Aftermath" (Sobu remix)	2:52

== Personnel ==
Adapted from the Aftermath liner notes.

Three Mile Pilot

- Maria Azevedo – lead vocals, instruments
- Shawn Brice – instruments
- Evan Sornstein – instruments

Additional musicians

- Boom chr Paige – remixing (11)

Production and additional personnel

- Battery – production, recording
- Erik Butler – photography
- Curium Design – design
- Da5id Din – mastering
- Curtis Gamill – assistant production

== Release history ==
Region	Date	Label	Format	Catalog
United States	1998	COP Intl.	CD	COP 044
