= Listen! (album) =

Studio album by Alien Faktor
- Released: 1996
- Recorded: 1995
- Studio: Milwaukee, WI
- Genre: Industrial
- Length: 64:47
- Label: Decibel
- Producer: Tom Muschitz

Alien Faktor chronology
Final Expenses (1996)	Listen! (1996)	Arterial Spray & Cattle Mutilations (1997)

Listen! is the third studio album by Alien Faktor, released in 1996 by Decibel.

== Reception ==
A critic for Sonic Boom gave Listen! a positive review and said "it does serve as a unique indicator in the diverse musical career that is Alien Faktor."

== Track listing ==
All tracks are written by Tom Muschitz.

No.	Title	Length
1.	"X"	16:29
2.	"Jones City"	14:27
3.	"Tinnitus"	15:32
4.	"Ocean Space"	15:30
5.	"Billy Sprecher's Graceland Adventure"	3:51

== Personnel ==
Adapted from the Listen! liner notes.

Alien Faktor

- Tom Muschitz – vocals, programming, production, engineering, mixing, mastering

== Release history ==
Region	Date	Label	Format	Catalog
United States	1996	Decibel	CD	DEC011
