= Ivan Iusco =

Italian musician and composer

- Born: September 4, 1970 (age 55)
- Origin: Bari, Italy
- Genres: Film music; classical; electronic; industrial; pop
- Occupations: Composer, music producer
- Years active: 1987–present
- Labels: Warner Music Group; EMI; Virgin Records; Minus Habens; Disturbance; Materiali Sonori
- Formerly of: Nightmare Lodge, It
- Website: www.ivaniusco.com

Ivan Iusco (born September 4, 1970) is an Italian American award-winning composer and record producer based in Los Angeles, California, United States.

== Background ==
As a youth in the 1970s, Ivan was inspired by Ennio Morricone's film scores, Japanese animation and science fiction film soundtracks. By age 7, Ivan began taking piano lessons. At 15 he bought his first synthesizer and started building a home studio.

== Career ==
=== Music ===
In 1987, he founded the pioneering Italian music label Minus Habens Records (involving artists such as Angelo Badalamenti, Brian Eno, Aphex Twin and Depeche Mode), through which he continues to explore and publish avant-garde and experimental music. Several years later he established the Disturbance label to focus on ambient electronic and techno music.

In 1987, Iusco also founded the dark ambient and industrial music group, Nightmare Lodge, whose music was primarily released through Minus Habens. By 1990, Iusco began recording under the name "IT" and released the first album under that name, Era Vulgaris, on his Disturbance imprint in 1996.

=== Film soundtracks and scoring ===
He debuted in the film industry in 1999, having composed the music for the Apulian cult movie LaCapaGira directed by Alessandro Piva, and went on to win Best Soundtrack at the 2000 Valencia Film Festival (Spain). In 2003 he composed the music for Mio Cognato, a movie by the same director, for which he received the 2004 Nastro d'Argento nomination for Best Soundtrack.

Iusco has partnered often with the well-known Italian director, Sergio Rubini, composing the main theme for the movie L'Anima Gemella (2002), the soundtrack of L'Amore Ritorna (2004), and an additional score for At a Glance (2008) which complemented the music of Pino Donaggio.

His scoring career also includes Ho Voglia Di Te (2007) by the Spanish director Luis Prieto; Fesibum / Maledetto Tag episode (2009) by Dino Giarrusso; 6 Sull'Autobus (2012) a project by Sergio Rubini produced by the Accademia Nazionale D'Arte Drammatica Silvio D'Amico (selected at the 69th Venice Film Festival); and Da Che Parte Stai (2016) by Francesco Lopez.

The track "Mobili In Mobilis", taken from his album Transients (2015), was nominated for the Best Instrumental Song by the American Songwriting Awards 2016.

In 2015 he created two multimedia artworks titled Mirror Drones and Between with the Canadian artist Cassandra Cronenberg, daughter of the director David Cronenberg.

In 2018 he scored the pilot of Rex Starlight, a TV series written by the American scriptwriter Daniel Greenspan. It was presented on March 11, 2018, at Soho House West Hollywood.

His latest projects include: the original score for the psychological thriller "State of Consciousness" starring Emile Hirsch ("Into The Wild") by the American director Marcus Stokes ("American Horror Story", "Criminal Minds", "The Flash", "Arrow"), the original score for the short film "A Woman Makes A Plan" by Alexo Wandael starring Maye Musk, two original songs for "Cyberpunk 2077", the worldwide acclaimed Sci-Fi dystopian video game starring Keanu Reeves and the score for the documentary "376 Days, Nick Cave: Keep it Movin" by Claude-Aline Miller, recently screened at The Guggenheim Museums and at the Museum of Contemporary Art Chicago.

== Movie soundtracks ==
Year	Title	Director	Notes
1999	Lacapagira	Alessandro Piva	
2001	Giorni	Laura Muscardin	
2002	Soul Mate	Sergio Rubini	main theme
2003	Mio cognato	Alessandro Piva	
2004	L'amore ritorna	Sergio Rubini	
2006	Checosamanca	Alice Rohrwacher	
2007	Ho voglia di te (film)	Luis Prieto (director)	
2008	Colpo d'occhio	Sergio Rubini	additional music
2009	Feisbum!	Dino Giarrusso	
2012	6 Sull'Autobus	VV.AA	
2017	Da Che Parte Stai	Francesco Lopez	
2021	Nicola: Cozze, Kebab & Coca Cola	Antonio Palumbo	
2021	Tomato Soup in Skid Row,	Alexo Wandael	
2022	State Of Consciousness	Marcus Stokes	

== Videoart, short film and documentary soundtracks ==
Year	Title	Director
2002	The Spy Inside Me	Materia
2004	Legamento	Materia
2005	Impossible Love	Luca Curci
2006	Impossible Garden	Luca Curci & Fabiana Roscioli
2006	Perotti Point	Alessandro Piva
2006	Zeleny Muz	Jack Wareing
2010	The Synth	Ivan Iusco
2011	The Empire Of R-Evolution	Luca Curci
2013	Gioco Nel Vento	Francesco Lopez
2013	Movimento 2	Andreia Vigo (performed by AjAx)
2016	Clown and Girl	Jack Wareing
2017	Emoticon	Antonio Palumbo
2018	Transatlantico Rex Nave 296	Maurizio Sciarra
2021	A Woman Makes A Plan with Maye Musk	Alexo Wandael
2022	376 Days, Nick Cave: 'Keep it Movin'	Claude-Aline Miller

== Discography ==
=== Solo ===
Year	Title	Music Label
2000	Lacapagira - Original Soundtrack	Virgin Records
2003	Mio Cognato - Original Soundtrack	Minus Habens Records/Emi Records
2004	L'amore ritorna - Original Soundtrack	Warner Chappell Music
2007	Ho voglia di te (film) - Original Soundtrack	EMI Records
2012	Water - Album	Minus Habens Records
2015	Transients - Album	Minus Habens Records
2020	Synthagma - Album	Minus Habens Records

=== With Nightmare Lodge ===
Year	Title	Music Label
1987	Big Mother In The Strain - cass	Minus Habens Records
1991	Asylum - cass	Minus Habens Records
1994	Negative Planet - album	Minus Habens Records
1995	Luminescence - album	Minus Habens Records
1997	Nosferatu! - 7"	Ant-Zen
1997	The Enemy Within - album	Minus Habens Records
1999	Syrena (with Paolo Bigazzi) - soundtrack	Minus Habens Records
1999	Blind Miniatures - album	Red Stream
2003	Nexus - 7"	SmallVoices

=== With Dive ===
Year	Title	Music Label
1993	Concrete Jungle - album	Minus Habens Records
1997	Snakedressed - album	Daft/COP International
1999	True Lies - album	Daft/COP International
2017	Underneath - album	Out Of Line

=== As "It" ===
Year	Title	Music Label
1992	Virtual Energy - 12"	Disturbance
1996	Era Vulgaris - album	Disturbance
1997	Era Vulgaris (Ncoded) - album	Disturbance
1998	Concubia Nocte (Drop 7.1) - album	Materiali Sonori
2003	Displaced - 12"	SmallVoices

== Official remixes ==
Year	Title	Music Label
2013	Peter Von Poehl - Aurora (Ivan Iusco remix) - taken from Vanishing Waves OST	Ici, d'ailleurs...
2014	Paul Leonard-Morgan - Search for the Cave (Ivan Iusco remix) - taken from Legendary OST	Just Temptation
2016	Stephen Hilton - Kill Command (Ivan Iusco remix) - taken from Kill Command OST	Great Temptation

== Awards and nominations ==
- Outstanding Achievement Award (Original Somg) - "The Other Side" taken from the album "Synthagma" - IndieX Fest (Los Angeles), US 2021
- Best Music Video Nomination - "Falling (Andante)" taken from the album "Transients" - Los Angeles CineFest, US 2017
- Best Instrumental Track Nomination "ASA 2016" - "Mobilis In Mobili" taken from the album "Transients" - American Songwriting Awards, US 2016
- Best Composer Award "Ombre Sonore Del Mediterraneo" - Teca del Mediterraneo/Consiglio Regionale della Puglia, Italy 2009
- Best Original Soundtrack Nomination "Diamanti Al Cinema" - soundtrack of the movie "Ho Voglia Di Te" - Venice Film Festival, Italy 2007
- Best Composer Special Award - Ragusa Film Festival, Italy 2004
- Best Original Soundtrack Nomination "Nastro d'Argento" (Silver Ribbon) - soundtrack of the movie "Mio Cognato" - Nastri d'Argento, Italy 2004
- Best Original Soundtrack Award - soundtrack of the movie "LaCapaGira" - Valencia Film Festival, Spain 2000
