= Decibel (record label) =

American independent record label

- Founded: 1994
- Founder: Tom Muschitz
- Defunct: 1998
- Genre: Industrial
- Country of origin: United States
- Location: Milwaukee, Wisconsin

Decibel is an independent record label based in Milwaukee, Wisconsin, founded in 1994. It debuted with the industrial music album Abduction by Alien Faktor released the same year.

== History ==
The Milwaukee based Decibel was founded in 1994 by composer Tom Muschitz. The label was initially established to release the debut album by Muschitz's project Alien Faktor, but soon after focused on issuing records by artists who were influenced by industrial informed electronic music. It served as an outlet for musical acts such as Morpheus Sister and Oneiroid Psychosis. The label's final release was Luciferin by Machine That Flashes in 1998.

== Discography ==
Year	Catalog	Artist	Album
1994	DEC001	Alien Faktor	Abduction
1995	DEC002	Oneiroid Psychosis	Stillbirth
1995	DEC003	Morpheus Sister	Morpheus Sister
1996	DEC004	Various artists	Complications
1996	DEC005	Alien Faktor	Desolate
1996	DEC006	Impact Test	Stanley BoDean
1995	DEC007	Severed Heads	Gigapus
1995	DEC008	No One	No One
1995	DEC009	Sirvix	Sirvix
1995	DEC010	Alien Faktor	Final Expenses
1995	DEC011	Alien Faktor	Listen!
1995	DEC012	Pain Station	Anxiety
1995	DEC013	Oneiroid Psychosis	Assuage
1996	DEC014	Oneiroid Psychosis	Fantasies About Illness
1997	DEC015	Decree	Wake of Devastation
1998	DEC016	Machine That Flashes	Luciferin
1997	DEC017	Various artists	Resonance
1997	DEC018	Krop3rom	A9FF
1997	DEC019	Alien Faktor	Arterial Spray & Cattle Mutilations
1996	DEC020	Coklacoma	Coklopop
