= Klinik =

Belgian industrial music band

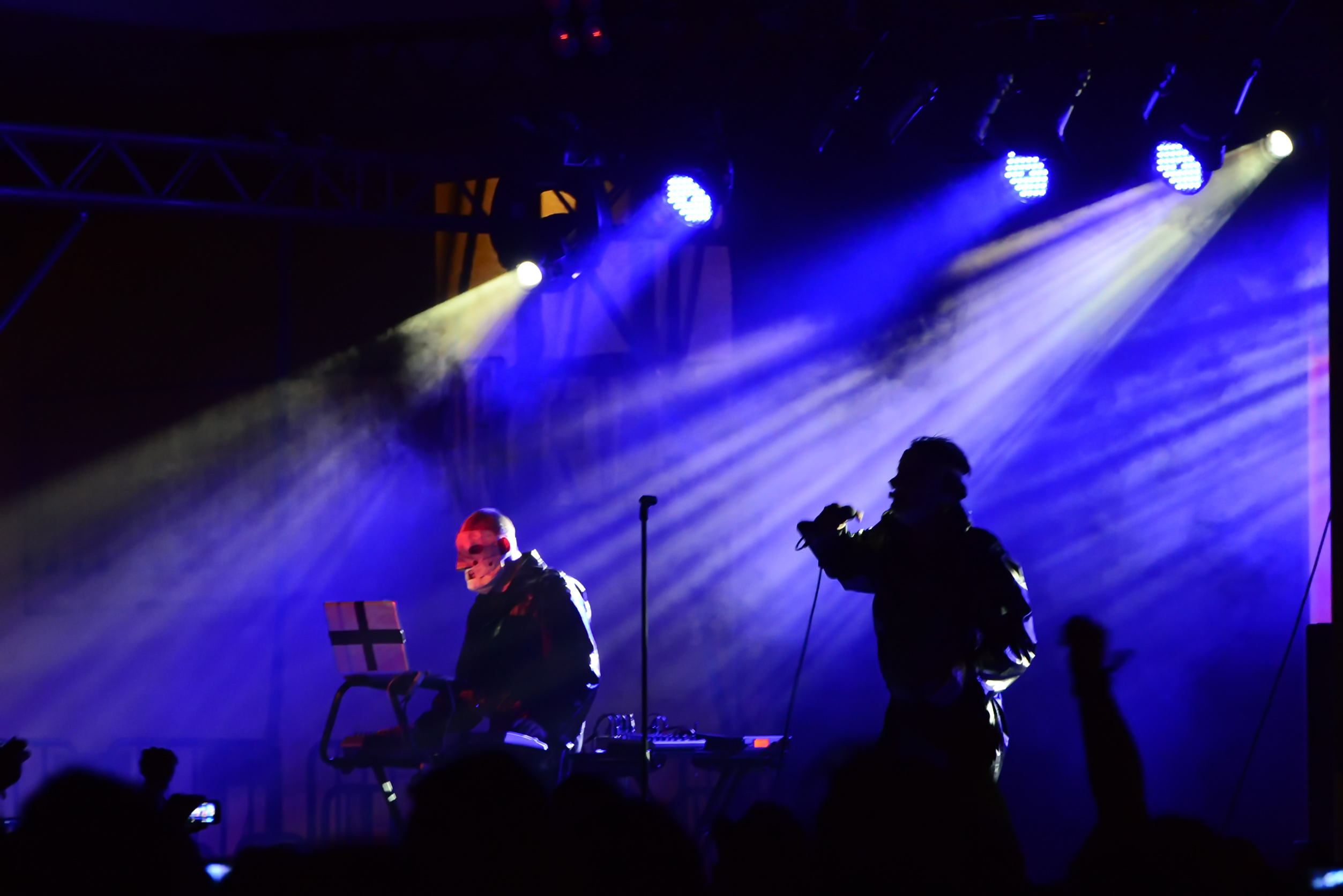

Background information
- Also known as: The Klinik, Absolute Controlled Clinical Maniacs
- Origin: Belgium
- Genres: Industrial; Electro-industrial; EBM
- Years active: 1980–present
- Labels: Antler-Subway; Zoth Ommog; Hands Productions
- Spinoffs: Dive; D.Sign; X10; Noise Unit; Para
- Members: Marc Verhaeghen; Mark Burghgraeve
- Past members: Dirk Ivens; Eric Van Wonterghem; Sandy Nijs; Thorsten Stroth; Tom Claes; Stefan Mertes; Nickanor; Peter Mastbooms

Klinik, sometimes called The Klinik, is an industrial music band from Belgium, originally formed around 1982 by electro-synthpop practitioner Marc Verhaeghen, who is the only constant member.

== History ==
Marc Verhaeghen originally formed Klinik in the early-to-mid 1980s; the exact date varies depending on the source. The group is normally described as one of the most influential Belgian industrial bands in history.

In 1985, Verhaeghen joined forces with two other bands, Absolute Body Control (with Dirk Ivens and Eric van Wonterghem), and "The Maniacs" (Sandy Nijs) to form one "super group" "Absolute Controlled Clinical Maniacs". This rather unwieldy name was soon dropped in favour of the shorter name "The Klinik". Through their connection with Sandy Nijs and his involvement in the international cassette trading network, Klinik received an offer to tour Norway in 1985.

Nijs soon left the band to form "Hybryds", followed in 1987 by van Wonterghem, leaving The Klinik as the "classic" duo of Dirk Ivens and Marc Verhaeghen.

The Klinik soon made a name for themselves with their cold and harsh EBM sound and their live shows, where both Ivens and Verhaeghen performed with their heads wrapped in gauze, wearing long black leather coats. Ivens' hissing vocals and minimalist lyrics were complemented by Verhaeghen's synthesizer skills and distorted trombone playing. This however, did not last forever; after Time, an album neither member was fully pleased with, musical differences became too great, and they decided to go their separate ways. In a 2013 interview, Ivens said the duo were moving in different directions musically, and that compromise between only two members was challenging.

Ivens concentrated on his own project Dive, and Verhaeghen continued as Klinik (dropping the definite article from the band name at this point); sometimes as a solo project, sometimes with various other members.

Most Klinik members have also been active outside the band. Ivens has been in bands such as Absolute Body Control, Dive, Sonar, and Blok 57; Eric van Wonterghem played with Ivens in Absolute Body Control, and has later been part of or collaborating with bands such as Insekt, Monolith, Dive and Sonar. Sandy Nijs formed Hybryds already around his departure in 1986, a project which is still active.

Verhaeghen has been involved in several projects outside Klinik, including Noise Unit (with Bill Leeb and Rhys Fulber of Front Line Assembly), D.Sign (with Philippe and Eliane Fichot of Die Form), X10 (with Niki Mono, Marc Ickx of A Split-Second and Vidna Obmana), and Para (with his own wife Sabine Voss).

Ivens and Verhaeghen briefly reunited for a few concerts in 2003/2004, one of which was released as a CD in September 2004. The reunion was not intended to last, but by 2008 Ivens and Verhaeghen decided to begin working on new material together as Klinik. Soon after, Verhaeghen fell ill which delayed production of the new album. While Verhaeghen convalesced, Ivens continued touring as Klinik, joined on stage by Peter Mastbooms (of Pressure Control and The Juggernauts).

The band's first album featuring both Verhaeghen and Ivens in 22 years, Eat Your Heart Out, was released by Out Of Line Records (Berlin) on CD and also in a limited pressing of 500 white and 200 black vinyl copies on 1 March 2013.

== Klinik members ==
- Marc Verhaeghen (1981–present)
- Dirk Ivens (1985–1991 and 2003–present)
- Eric van Wonterghem (1985–87)
- Sandy Nijs (1985)
- Mark "Merlin" Burghgraeve (1981–82, 1995)
- Thorsten Stroth (1995)
- Tom Claes (1996)
- Stefan Mertes (1996)
- Nickanor (2002)
- Peter Mastbooms

== Discography ==
=== Albums ===
- Sabotage - LP (RIO 1985)
- Melting Close & Sabotage - DLP/CD (Antler 1987)
- Plague - LP (Antler 1987)
- Face to Face - CD/LP (Antler 1989)
- The Klinik Box Set - 3LP/DCD (Antler 1990; re-released on Hands Productions 2004)
- Time - LP/CD (Antler-Subway 1991)
- States - compilation LP/CD (Antler-Subway 1991)
- Braindamage - CD (Bootleg 1992)
- Contrast - CD (Antler 1992)
- Live - CD (1993)
- To the Knife - CD (Zoth Ommog 1995)
- Stitch - CD (Off Beat 1995)
- Awake - CD (Off Beat 1996)
- Blanket of Fog - CD (Off Beat 1998)
- End of the Line - compilation 4CD (Dependent 2001)
- Sonic Surgery - CD (Hands Productions 2002)
- Akhet - DCD (Hands Productions 2003)
- Dark Surgery - CD (Hands Productions 2004)
- Live at Wave-Gotik-Treffen 2004 - CD (Hands Productions 2004)
- Eat Your Heart Out - CD (Out Of Line 2013)
- The Klinik - compilation 8CD (Out Of Line 2014)

=== Singles and EPs ===
- Walking with Shadows - MLP (Auxilio De Cientos 1986)
- Pain and Pleasure - 12" (Antler 1986)
- Fear - 12" (Antler 1987)
- Fever - 12" (Antler 1989)
- Insane Terror/A Sign - 7" (1989)
- Black Leather - 12"/CD (Antler-Subway 1990)
- Touch - EP (1996)

=== Split releases ===
- Melting Close - MLP (split LP with De Fabriek, 1986)
- Brain - EP/CD (split EP with Paracont, 1993)

=== Collaborative releases ===
- Gluttony (with Vidna Obmana) - CD (Hands Productions 2005)
- Greed (with Vidna Obmana) - CD (Hands Productions 2006)

== See also ==
- List of electro-industrial bands
