= Sonar (band) =

Belgian musical group

- Origin: Belgium
- Genres: Industrial, techno, power noise
- Years active: 1996–present
- Spinoff of: Dive; Absolute Body Control
- Members: Dirk Ivens, Eric Van Wonterghem
- Past members: Patrick Stevens

Sonar is a Belgian musical group. Sonar combines power noise, techno, and industrial music.

Sonar was formed as a side-project of noise artist Dirk Ivens in 1996. At first, Ivens employed the help of Patrick Stevens. Later, Eric Van Wonterghem, who had worked with Ivens in Absolute Body Control, joined Ivens as the second member of Sonar.

Sonar toured in Europe with Canadian music project Decoded Feedback in 2001.

== Discography ==
Year	Album	Type	Record label	Notes
1996	Rotation	Limited ed. Single Vinyl	Divine Comedy Records	
1996	Untitled	CD, LP	Daft Records	
1997	On Mission Inside	EP	Drag & Drop Industrial	
1997	Live	Cassette	Escape 3 Organisation	
1997	Dislocated	Limited ed. Single Vinyl	Ant-Zen	
1998	Overdose Simulation	CD, LP	COP International	#28 CMJ RPM Charts
1998	Connected	Picture LP	Triton	
1998	Sonar vs Muslimgauze	CD	Daft Records	With Muslimgauze
1999	Cosmic Live Rays	EP CD	self-released	
1999	Cosmic Rays	LP	Hymen Records	
1999	Voodoo Vision	Single Picture Vinyl	Triton	
2000	Remote Assault	CD	Daft Records	
2001	Parallel Friction	Single Picture Vinyl	Klanggalerie	
2003	Volt Control	CD	Daft Records	
2003	Volt Revisited	Limited ed. 2Vinyl 10"	Hands Productions	
2005	Bad Man	EP CD	self-released	
2006	Alien Overdrive	CD	KDX	
2012	Cut Us Up	CD	Ant-Zen	
2014	Shadow Dancers	CD	Sleepless Records Berlin	
2023	Future Cries	CD	Hands Productions	

== Music festivals ==
Sonar performed at:

- Infest, United Kingdom (2002, 2011)
- Kinetik, Canada (2008)
- Maschinenfest, Germany (2001, 2003, 2005, 2007, 2008, 2010, 2012, 2014)
- M'era Luna, Germany (2002)
