= Stoneburner =

Stoneburner is a surname. Notable people with this surname include:

- Jake Stoneburner (born 1989), American football player
- Terri Stoneburner (born 1945), American judge
