= Kirlian Camera =

Italian rock band

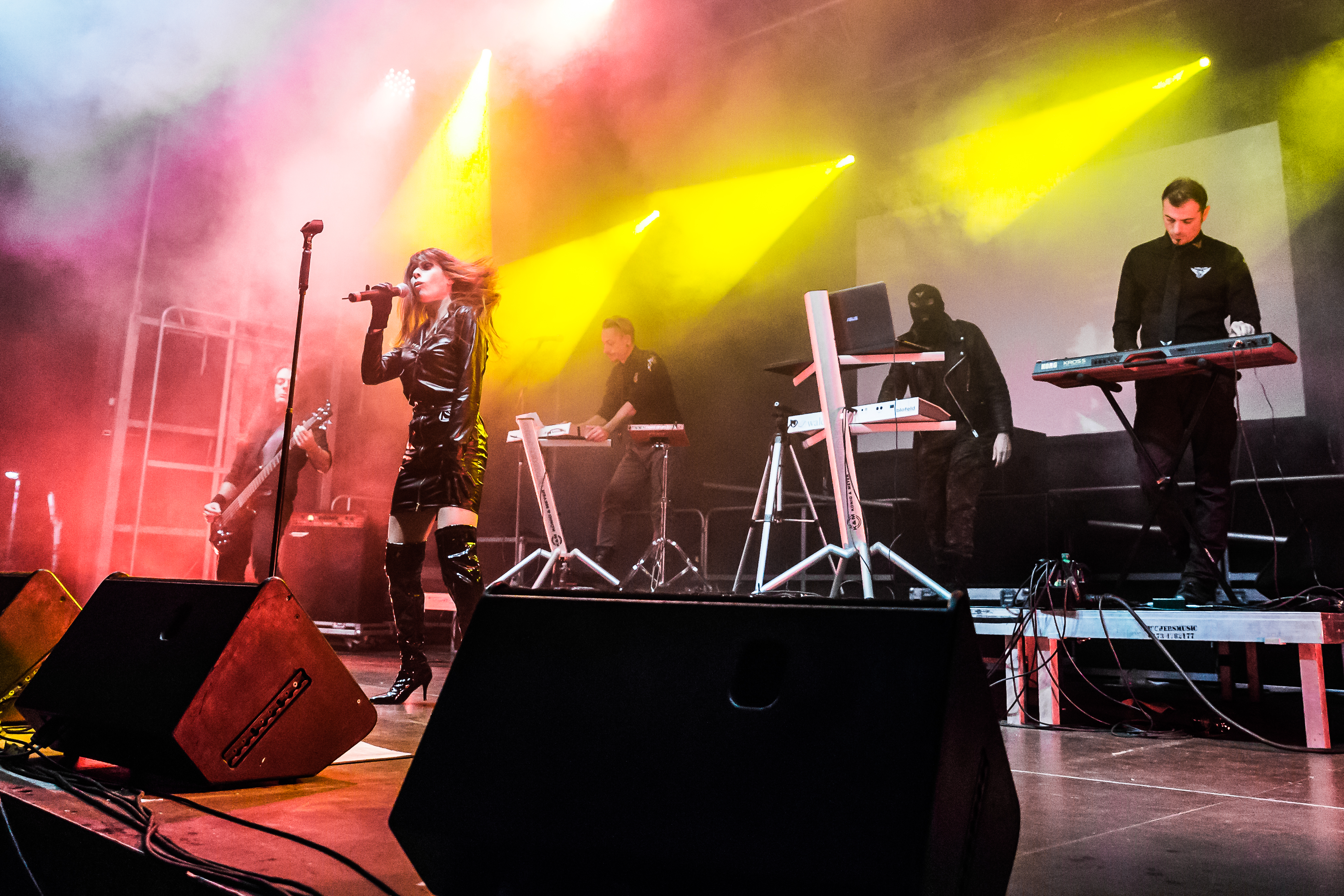
- Kirlian Camera live at Nocturnal Culture Night 2018 in Germany

Background information
- Origin: Parma, Italy
- Genres: Electro Wave, dark wave, electronic rock, art rock
- Years active: 1980–present
- Labels: Discordia; Nova Tekk; Trisol; Triton; Virgin Music; Out of Line
- Members: Elena Alice Fossi; Angelo Bergamini; Alessandro "Algol" Comerio; Irene Shapes
- Past members: Simona Buja; Emilia Lo Jacono; Fabrizio Chiara; Giorgio Vecchi; Barbara Boffelli; Kyoo Nam Rossi; Falk Pitschk
- Website: www.kirliancamera.com

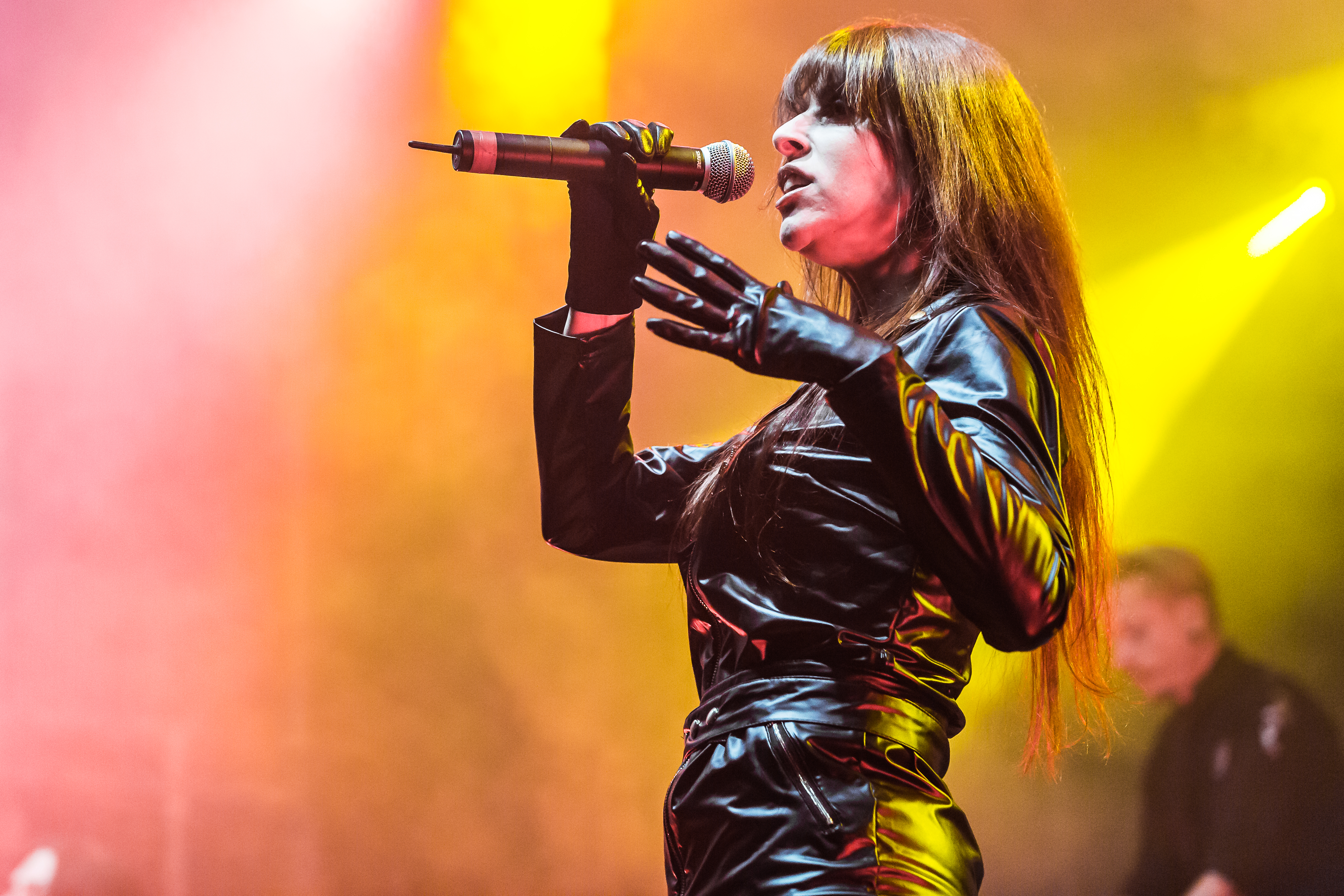
Singer Elena Fossi at NCN 2018

Kirlian Camera is an Italian rock band mainly playing electro wave, dark wave, Electronic Rock and Art Rock with pop influences.

== History ==
The project was founded in Parma in 1979 by Angelo Bergamini and was a pioneering act of the Italian synthpop scene. By 1980, Bergamini had recruited singer Simona Buja, keyboardist Fabrizio Chiari and bassist Mauro Montacchini to form Kirlian Camera. Their demo cassette Dawn attracted the attention of Italian Records, a popular independent label. Christmas 1981 saw the release of their debut vinyl which despite being low-budget immediately sold-out and was then re-issued, with it finally selling more than 6,000 copies.

Not long after, the band had constant lineup changes. Simona left but rejoined the following year; Montacchini left and was replaced by Giorgio Vecchi. Eventually, they became the first Italian group to be signed to Virgin Records.

Between 1982 and 1984, Bergamini also took part in the Italian Italo disco group Hipnosis, which won a platinum award for sales in Germany, and had a top 10 hit in several European countries and South America with their single "Pulstar". Angelo unexpectedly decided to leave Hipnosis to concentrate on Kirlian Camera.

During the second half of the eighties, the sound of Kirlian Camera became gradually darker, moving away from the synth pop sound that marked some of their early releases. In 1988, Buja left and the band had temporary singers Bianca Hoffmann-Santos and Suzanne Reddington-Gardner, who were replaced for a while by Emilia Lo Jacono. Despite this the band released a 2-CD collection called The Ice Curtain with new singer Barbara Boffelli.

In 1993, they signed to German label Discordia, which licensed the self-produced album Todesengel, The Fall of Life. In 1995, they collaborated with label mates Dive on the Obsession EP.

During 2000 the lineup was stabilized when singer/composer/writer Elena Alice Fossi joined the band. She is also the leader of side-projects Alice Neve Fox, Spectra*paris and Siderartica, and co-leader in the Stalingrad project (nowadays renamed as Stalingrad Valkyrie) with Bergamini.

During 2013, Kirlian Camera released Black Summer Choirs.

In late 2017, the band of Elena Alice Fossi and Angelo Bergamini released the single "Sky Collapse" (featuring Eskil Simonsson of Covenant) via Dependent Records, and it immediately gained success in Central Europe. In 2018, the new album Hologram Moon (released in standard and special editions including the bonus album Ghost Novas) quickly became the best-seller of the band ever as far as a full-length studio work is concerned, even entering the official German music charts and staying at No. 1 on the German Alternative charts for several weeks.

== Controversy ==
On 26 April 1999, Kirlian Camera were drawn into the then-current sensationalism over Goth culture when they were off-handedly mentioned by social scientist Alfred Schobert in Der Spiegel, in an interview printed as a sidebar to a 4-page newspaper feature on the Columbine High School shootings. Schobert contended that the group (along with Death in June and Boyd Rice) was an example of a "neo-fascist element" in contemporary goth and EBM music, and accused them of performing a Roman salute onstage.

In their next CD, the group issued a communique, stating that they were offended by the witchhunt against them, but that they wanted to keep their political opinions to themselves, refusing to place the band within one specific political orientation. They denied that they were "right-wing extremists", pointing out that past member Nancy Appiah was Ghanaian, and that they sing lyrics by the Jewish-German poet August Stramm. However, they were not allowed to respond in Der Spiegel, and as a result cancellations of shows and protests by Anti-Fascist Action continued to dog them through 2002.

== Discography ==
=== Albums ===
- It Doesn't Matter Now (1983)
- Eclipse (Das Schwarze Denkmal) (1988)
- Todesengel. The Fall of Life (1991)
- Schmerz (1994, full-length re-issue of same title EP originally released 1992)
- Solaris - The Last Corridor (1995)
- Pictures from Eternity (Bilder Aus Der Ewigkeit) (1996)
- The Ice Curtain (1997, 2CD collection)
- Unidentified Light (1999)
- Still Air (Aria Immobile) (2000)
- Kalte Container (1999 - incl. unreleased remixes. Limited edition version incl. biography book)
- Uno (2002, re-issue incl. Dawn demotape and 'Kirlian Camera' mini-album)
- Live in London (2003 - bootleg acknowledged by the band)
- Invisible Front. 2005 (2004)
- Coroner's Sun (2006)
- Shadow Mission HELD V (2009, collection incl. unreleased songs and new versions)
- Odyssey Europa (2009, 4CD/2CD collection)
- Not of This World (2010, 3CD collection)
- Nightglory (2011)
- Black Summer Choirs (2013)
- Uno Vinyl (2014, remastered & re-issue by Dark Entries Records incl. bonus flexi-disc Minitech originally released in 1981)
- Hologram Moon (2018, available on several editions, also with the bonus album "Ghost Novas")
- Cold Pills (Scarlet Gate of Toxic Daybreak) (2021)
- Radio Signals for the Dying (2024)

=== Singles, EPs and mini-albums ===
- Dawn... (1980, demotape)
- Kirlian Camera (1981, minialbum)
- Passing Masks (1982, released under name 'Simona Buja from Kirlian Camera')
- Communicate (1983)
- Edges (1984)
- Blue Room (1985)
- Ocean (1986)
- Human/Ocean (1986 - promo split single with The Human League)
- Ocean (remixed version by Atelier Folie) (1987)
- Helden Platz (1987)
- Austria (1988)
- Schmerz (1992, EP)
- Split (1993 single split with Andromeda Complex)
- Erinnerung (1993)
- Eklipse Zwei (1994, EP)
- Le Printemps Des Larmes (1994, vinyl EP included in the box-set edition of 'Schmerz')
- Obsession (1995 EP split with Dive)
- Your Face In The Sun (1996)
- The Desert Inside (1997, miniabum)
- Drifting (1998)
- The Burning Sea (1999)
- Absentee (2001, minialbum)
- untitled (2003, mini-CDr incl. unreleased tracks of KC, Siderartica and Camera Artica)
- Berliner Messe (2005, vinyl ltd. edition))
- Ghloir Ar An Oiche (2011)
- Immortal (2012, EP)
- Edges (21st Century Versions) (2014, vinyl)
- Sky Collapse (2017, vinyl and CD, EP)
- Hellfire (2019, 4-track promo EP, special edition of 100 hand-numbered CDs)
- Hellfire (2019, vinyl and CD, 8-track mini-album)

== Trivia ==
Their frontwoman Elena Alice Fossi is LGBT. She once said: "I also like that a girl was in love with a girl. It happens, whether some people like it or not! Then, it's part of my own story...".
