= Android Lust =

American band

- Origin: United States
- Genres: Electro-industrial; industrial rock; experimental
- Years active: 1996–present
- Labels: Tinman; Projekt Records; Synthellec Music
- Members: Shikhee D’iordna
- Website: www.androidlust.com

Android Lust is the solo project of Shikhee D’iordna, that combines elements of rock, electropop, electro-industrial and classical styles into a blend of music that she describes as "electronic and dark."

== History ==
Shikhee D’iordna was born in Bangladesh, but grew up in England and the USA. In 1999, she moved to New York City.

Prior to 1995, D’iordna was a member of couple of different rock-oriented bands. At the end of 1995 after one of these bands split up, D’iordna sought to begin a new project but gave up on finding compatible bandmates and resumed as a solo project. She was offered a record deal after handing off a demo of her initial work on Resolution to Tinman Records. Her initial work was done entirely electronically, and attracted a goth/electropop/electro-industrial following.

After two independent label releases D’iordna released The Dividing on her own in 2002, bringing her to the attention of Projekt Records, who signed her and re-released the album. For The Dividing, D’iordna added live acoustic instruments to her repertoire, including work by guest musicians Scott Slapin, Lew Del Gatto of the Saturday Night Live band, and Christopher Jon (aka Nurv) of I, Parasite. Outburn Magazine called The Dividing "unconventional and adventurous - 10 out of 10" while the Boston Phoenix said "The Dividing never misfires; it feels almost - but not quite - slick, its arranging smart, its themes ingenious." Jane Magazine said "The Dividing is filled with intensely passionate lyrics delivered in low whispers and startling, penetrating screaming." That album involved more live instrumentation, on the album all performed by D’iordna. In the supporting tour she was joined by a live drummer and live keyboardist. She felt that, while dark it was a more optimistic collection than her earlier work, and that her fanbase had become more diversified.

D’iordna's third full-length album, Devour, Rise, and Take Flight, was released on February 21, 2006. "Dragonfly," the first single for the album, was released on October 18. The album featured more live instrumentation than The Dividing, but embraced a more aggressive electronic sound. This album also saw some creative collaboration with Christopher Jon, Android Lust's live drummer, who co-wrote one track with D’iordna, performed on other tracks and helped mix the album. Also in 2006, a video for "Dragonfly," was directed by New York director Dan Ouellette.

In 2009, D’iordna established her own label, Synthellec Music, to release Android Lust and her other compositions. The first new release on Synthellec Music, The Human Animal, was made available at androidlust.com on July 22, 2010, with an official street date of August 10, 2010.

D’iordna's fifth album, Crater Vol. 1, marked a departure from her previous recordings by integrating field recordings into a more atmospheric composition with minimal vocal styling.

Android Lust's album, Berlin // Crater Vol. 2, was released on August 18, 2017 and, like Volume 1, was financed on Kickstarter. The second of the "Crater" series was produced using recordings D’iordna took while visiting Berlin, continuing in the same style as Volume 1.

Following the "Crater" releases, D’iordna self-released an EP, Shores Unknown, which included the tracks “Born To Rule” and “Shores Unknown” which appeared on the 2018 video game release Agony.

While never having formed any side projects, D’iordna has contributed vocal work to several other bands including Oneiroid Psychosis, I, Parasite, Signal 12 and others. In 2020, D’iordna collaborated with her longtime friend kaRIN of Collide to record the track "Are You Listening" with an accompanying video directed by Tas Limur.

== Discography ==
Studio albums

- Resolution (1998)
- Evolution (1999)
- The Dividing (2002)
- Devour, Rise and Take Flight (2006)
- The Human Animal (2010)
- Crater Vol. 1 (2013)
- Berlin // Crater Vol. 2 (2017)
- Raw // Crater Vol. 2 (2017)
