= Oneiroid Psychosis =

American dark wave musical duo

- Origin: Wisconsin
- Genres: Dark wave
- Years active: 1991–present
- Labels: Psylab Studios; COP International; Decibel; Nilaihah
- Members: Lars Hansen, Leif Hansen

Oneiroid Psychosis is an American dark wave musical duo consisting of brothers Lars and Leif Hansen. Originally known simply as Psychosis, they were discovered by Decibel Records in 1993 and have been making music using the name Oneiroid Psychosis since.

== History ==
Oneiroid Psychosis was formed in 1991 by Lars Hansen simply under the name Psychosis, changed to Oneiroid Psychosis shortly after as another band with the same name was already in existence. The addition of Oneiroid to the name came from reading through a medical dictionary:

"I came across it in a medical dictionary as I was looking into different types of psychoses. It really seemed to fit the type of atmosphere and mood we were creating with our music. And In Greek mythology, the Oneiroi were the brothers or sons of Hypnos, the god of sleep. They were personifications of dreams-black-winged demons. It just fit so perfectly with what we’re creating..."

Through a friend named Kevin Gayton, Lars and Leif got a tape to Tom Muschitz, who signed them to his label, Decibel Records. OP's first album, Stillbirth was released in 1995 by Decibel. In addition to several new songs and a hidden musical track unlike anything else the band has done, four songs from The Time Spent Dead demo were included on the album, two after being re-recorded entirely, and two after being remastered. Stillbirth was re-released on COP International in 2003. The album artwork is by Paul Nitsche. After Stillbirth, OP released two more CDs on Decibel in 1996: A single, called Assuage and the album Fantasies About Illness. "Assuage" was the only single released for the album, and in fact, the only single OP have ever released. CMJ ranked the album #23 on the Top 25 Dance albums in May 1997. The album artwork is by Paul Nitsche.

After these two releases, however, Decibel moved to a new city, which resulted in a number of complications regarding the next album, Garden of Remembrance. OP was forced to separate from Decibel, but found a new home with Nilaihah Records. Garden of Remembrance features guest appearances by Kristy Venrick of The Azoic and Shikhee of Android Lust.

OP’s fourth album, DREAMS (with pollutions when virile) was released in 2001 by COP International, and a re-release of 1995's Stillbirth followed a year later. On OP’s fifth full-length album, Forever is Forgotten, Lars wrote all the music and Leif wrote all the lyrics. Forever is Forgotten was released in 2004.

In 2008 Oneiroid Psychosis became a solo project, and Lars started his own company, called Psylab Studios. OP independently released Sentient, completely written and recorded by Lars, with lyrics by Leif on three of the tracks.

In April 2009, Lars suffered a massive head injury which nearly took his life. After a long and intense recovery, Lars opened a newly remodeled studio, Leif joined OP again. OP have been working on and off on a new album and in early 2015 Lars wrote "I have NOT forgotten the new album. But I have been struggling a great deal due to the head injury and will not finish the album just to get it finished. I want it to feel right when I write and produce".

== Side projects ==
Lars and Leif, while working with Oneiroid Psychosis, also made different kinds of music using the following names.

- Signal 12
- No One
- Ascent

== Discography ==
=== Albums ===
1. Stillbirth (1995, re-released in 2003)
2. Fantasies About Illness (1996)
3. Garden of Remembrance (1999)
4. Dreams (With Pollutions When Virile) (2001)
5. Forever is Forgotten (2004)
6. Sentient (2008)
7. Anhedonia (2020)

=== Singles ===
1. "Assuage" (1996)
