= Deathline International =

American musical group

- Origin: Oakland, California, United States
- Genres: Industrial rock
- Years active: 1991–present
- Label: COP Intl.
- Past members: Shawn Brice; G.W. Childs; Eric Gottesman; Maurice Jackson; Steve Lam; Marisa Lenhardt; James Perry; Christian Petke; Nikki Soandso
- Website: copint.com

Deathline International are an American industrial rock group based in Oakland, California, known for experimenting with multiple electronic music styles. The original nucleus of the band comprised composers Shawn Brice (Wiz Art, Spawn) and Christian Petke (Count Zero). The band released five studio albums on COP International: Reality Check (1993), Zarathoustra (1995), Arashi Syndrom (1997), Cybrid (2001), Pax Americana (2022).

== History ==
Deathline International was formed in 1991 out of Oakland, California, by composers Shawn Brice and Christian Petke. The band made their debut with 1993's Reality Check, released by COP International. The album was a fusion of orchestral samples with electro and heavy metal.

The EP Venus Mind Trap was released in April 1995 and produced with the musical input of John Carson of Grotus, Rey Osburn of Tinfed, Suzanne Santos of Hydro Chi Non and Evan Sornstein of Battery. They followed that release in November with the band's second album Zarathoustra. Their second album was produced with the collaborative efforts of most of the COP Intl. roaster. The band provided a cover of Soft Cell's "Tainted Love", originally written for and performed by Gloria Jones, to COP Intl.'s Chaos Compilation in 1994.

The band's third album Arashi Syndrom and second EP Wild Boys were released in 1997, with the former peaking at number twenty-one on CMJ's Dance Top 25. The album was commended for its synthesis of their brand of coldwave industrial music with new wave while showcasing the band's expanded compositional diversity. Founding member Shawn Brice departed from the band to pursue his own musical interests after deciding that Arashi Syndrome would be his final album writing credit with Deathline International.

Keyboardist G.W. Childs joined the band, and in 2001 the band released their fourth album Cybrid. The band began releasing new material again on COP Intl. with the EP Eisbär in 2016. The following years saw the release of several more EPs, including Spin Zone, Breaking and Spin Zone II. In 2020 the band covered The Vibrators "Troops of Tomorrow", which they originally covered for 1997's Arashi Syndrom, with Dead Kennedys frontman Jello Biafra and released it as a single on Bandcamp.

== Discography ==
Studio albums

- Reality Check (1993, COP Intl.)
- Zarathoustra (1995, COP Intl.)
- Arashi Syndrom (1997, COP Intl.)
- Cybrid (2001, COP Intl.)
- Pax Americana (2022, COP Intl.)

Extended plays

- Venus Mind Trap (1995, COP Intl.)
- Wild Boys (1997, COP Intl.)
- Eisbär (2016, COP Intl.)
- Spin Zone (2018, COP Intl.)
- Breaking (2019, Distortion/COP Intl.)
- Spin Zone II (2020, Distortion)
- Parasite (2021, COP Intl.) - #18 German Alternative Charts (DAC)
