= Razor Skyline =

American goth/industrial band

The Razor Skyline
- Origin: Seattle, Washington, United States
- Genres: Gothic rock
- Years active: 1994–present
- Label: COP International
- Members: The_gun (Corey Wittenberg); Miska Kazda; Onyx
- Past members: Karen Kardell; Ioejekta; Robin Jacobs; Charlotte Shai; Kim Furumori; Mary Werner

The Razor Skyline is an American, San Francisco, United States–based goth/industrial band.

== History ==
Formed in Seattle in 1994, the band began life as Journal of Trauma and consisted of members Karen Kardell and Corey Wittenberg (using the stage name "the_gun"). The chemistry was instant, and the songs and shows quickly followed. It took less than a year and a half for the band (now a 3-piece with the addition of ioejekta on electronic percussion) to be signed to the C.O.P. International label and have their first CD recorded. The band changed their name to The RaZor Skyline but was allowed to use the name Journal of Trauma for their debut album. In a 1999 interview, the_gun said he chose the name The RaZor Skyline when he looked up at the night sky to see the stars but found they were blocked by the buildings, lights, telephone wires, etc. There were only a few slices of the sky in between these man-made structures and he felt the skyline was like a razor, "slicing the sky into pieces."

As the band started work on their second album in 1997, artistic differences saw Karen Kardell leaving the band. The_gun and ioejekta auditioned several singers to find a replacement, including Debra Fogarty (who later formed Diva Destruction) SeVerina X Sol (who went on to be in Fockewolfe, Diva Destruction, Cylab, The Break Up and currently, Sol Sirenn) before deciding on Charlotte Shai and moving the band to San Francisco. The band began recording their 2nd CD with Mark27 who had played with Assemblage 23, Dead Language and later Sunshine Blind. Four singles were recorded - "Exit Zero", "Torture Chamber", "Vespertine" and "One Night in Bangkok", which featured the_gun singing in Russian.

However, the magic of the original duo was missing, and Karen Kardell and the_gun reconciled and decided to work together again, replacing ioejekta on electronic percussion with newcomer Onyx. Fade and Sustain was released in 1999 and the band set off on a midwest/east coast tour with Bella Morte. During this time, the band also had songs appear in two movies - the documentary "Sex, Death and Eyeliner" and the German horror movie " Demonium".

In 2002 the band recorded its third album, The Bitter Well, in Seattle with M.o. Jackson (who later went on to be in Numberiklab, the project that wrote the theme to the TV show NCIS). The album was released in 2003.

Shortly after the release of The Bitter Well, the band went on hiatus and the_gun formed Flatline Transmissions who recorded a 6-song self-released EP and played shows on the West Coast, including shows with Faith and the Muse, Snog and a reformed Specimen.

Karen Kardell eventually decided to give up singing to pursue other interests and in 2009 Miska Kazda (who was the vocalist for Dalet-Yod) was brought in as the new voice of TRS. The band's first four singles "Vittoria", "Sahara", "This City Never Sleeps" and "View of Paradise" for their new album "Dark Water Oasis" were produced by Jon Klein of Specimen/Siouxsie and the Banshees. The album was released in 2012.

== Discography ==
- Albums
  - Journal of Trauma, 1996
  - Fade and Sustain, 1999
  - The Bitter Well, 2003
  - Dark Water Oasis, 2012
- Compilation albums
  - COP Compilation, COP International, 1996
  - Infiltrate and Corrupt, COP International, 1997
  - Diva X Machina, COP International, 1996
  - Sound-Line Vol 3, Sideline Records, 1997
  - Silicon Warfare, Arts Industria, 1998
  - Diva X Machina 2, COP International, 1998
  - Newer Wave 2.0, 21st Circuitry, 1998
  - Hex Files Vol. 3, NovaTekk, 1998
  - Songs for Marius, Final Exit, 1998
  - Diva X Machina 3, COP International, 2000
  - Only Sorrow, 2000
  - Sex, Death and Eyeliner the soundtrack, Dark Future Music, 2000
  - The Broken Machine, Vitamin Records, 2001
  - Trinity Vol. 1, Darkcell Digital Music, 2002
  - Dark Awakening Vol. 3, COP International, 2004
  - State of Synthpop, A Different Drum, 2005

== Sources ==
- Razor Skyline | AllMusic Biography & History
