= Battery (electro-industrial band) =

American electro-industrial band

- Origin: Bennington, Vermont, U.S.
- Genre: Electro-industrial
- Years active: 1989–2000
- Label: COP Intl.
- Past members: Maria Azevedo; Shawn Brice; Stuart Scanlon; Evan Sornstein

Battery was an American electro-industrial trio based in San Francisco. It consisted of vocalist Maria Azevedo and musicians Evan Sornstein and Shawn Brice. They released four albums on COP International between 1993 and 1998 before disbanding.

== History ==
Battery was formed at Bennington College, Vermont, in 1989 by Shawn Brice, Stuart Scanlon and Evan Sornstein, beginning in an electronic music project for class. In 1991, the trio relocated to San Francisco, where they were adopted by COP Intl. In 1992, Stuart moved back to the East Coast, and Battery recruited vocalist Maria Azevedo who had stood in during a live show.

COP International issued the band's debut album Mutate in 1993. Their second album nv released in 1995. It was followed by Distance a year later, which was a culmination of four months in the studio. Their fourth and final album Aftermath was released in 1998. Amy Hanson of AllMusic described the album as "a highlight" and a "testament to their creative drive." The band dissolved in 2000, with its band members pursuing separate projects.

== Discography ==
Studio albums

- Mutate (1993, COP Intl.)
- nv (1995, COP Intl.) – #23 CMJ RPM Charts
- Distance (1996, COP Intl.)
- Aftermath (1998, COP Intl.) – #14 CMJ RPM Charts

Extended plays

- Eternal Darkness (1991, COP Intl.)
- Meat Market (1992, COP Intl.)
- Lilith 3.2 (1994, COP Intl.)
- Momentum (1998, COP Intl.) – #15 CMJ RPM Charts
- Debris (1999)
