= Maria Azevedo =

American singer

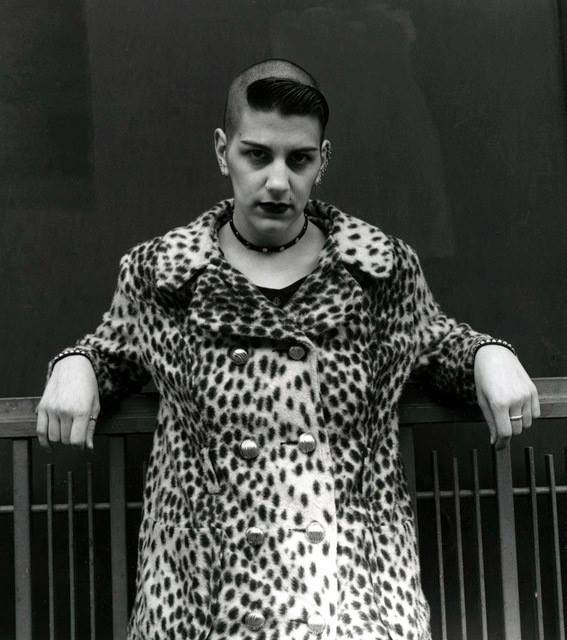
- Azevedo in 1996

Background information
- Genres: Electro-industrial
- Occupation: Musician
- Instrument: Vocals
- Years active: 1992–present
- Formerly of: Battery

Maria Azevedo is an American musician based in San Francisco, best recognized as the lead vocalist of the 1990s electro-industrial outfits Battery and Ivoux. She also collaborated with Deathline Int'l., Razor Skyline and Vampire Rodents.

== Biography ==
Azevedo was raised in Santa Rosa, California in a family of Italian descent. While studying abroad in London, she became college roommates with the sister of future bandmate Evan Sornstein. When she moved to San Francisco in 1992 she joined Sornstein's band Battery as a vocalist. In 1997 Azevedo collaborated with other members of Battery on the side project Ivoux and released the album Frozen.

== Discography ==
Battery

- Mutate (1993)
- nv (1995)
- Distance (1996)
- Aftermath (1998)

Ivoux

- Frozen: A Suite of Winter Songs (1997)

DIA

- Integration (2001)

Guest appearances

- Deathline International: Reality Check (1993)
- Vampire Rodents: Clockseed (1995)
- Deathline International: Zarathoustra (1995)
- Vampire Rodents: Gravity's Rim (1996)
- Slave Unit: Slave Unit (1996)
- Razor Skyline: Journal of Trauma (1996)
- Heavy Water Factory: Author of Pain (1997)
- Thorn Apple: Gradient (2002)
- Nahja Mora : The Trees See More (2017)
