= COP International =

Record label based in Oakland, California

- Founded: 1991
- Founder: Christian Petke; Kim X
- Genre: Electro-industrial, EBM, Industrial metal, Hellectro
- Country of origin: Germany / United States
- Location: Frankfurt / Oakland, California
- Official website: copint.com

COP International, also shortened to COP Int'l., is a music label based in Oakland, California.

Initially, the label was founded in 1991 by Christian Petke (a.k.a. Count Zero of Deathline Int'l.) in Frankfurt, Germany. A few months later, Kim X, his girlfriend, opened a branch office in Oakland.

The first label full-length release was the California Cyber Crash Compilation. Most of the involved artists, such as Diatribe, Battery, Kode IV, Consolidated, Biohazard PCB (a.k.a. Contagion), Deathline Intl. and Switchblade Symphony, became very popular in the 1990s Electro-industrial scene.

Other leading label groups were Index, Pulse Legion, Unit:187, Pain Emission and The Razor Skyline.

The label has released a number of compilations, among the more notable of which were the female-focused, "Diva X Machina" compilations series.

In 2020, Petke brought on producer John Fryer as a partner in forming a production company and providing A&R for the label.

== COP International Roster ==
- Azam Ali
- Battery
- Beastö Blancö
- Bestias De Asalto
- Blackcarburning
- Carphax Files
- Cassandra Complex, The
- Chiasm
- C-Lekktor
- Coldkill
- Consolidated
- Deathline International
- Diatribe
- Electrovot
- Fishtank No. 9
- Imbue
- Index
- Jean-Marc Lederman
- Life Cried
- Luna 13
- Marian's Joy
- Mari Kattman
- Nerve Factor
- NoLongerHuman
- Nurzery [Rhymes]
- ...Of Skin & Saliva
- Oneiroid Psychosis
- Pain Emission
- Pain Station
- Phantom Vision
- [product]
- Pulse Legion
- Razor Skyline, The
- Red Lorry Yellow Lorry
- Reversal Penetrations
- Rohn - Lederman
- Signal 12
- Sjöblom
- Skylash
- Slave Unit
- Soil & Eclipse
- Stabbing Westward
- Stoneburner
- Suicide Queen
- Switchblade Symphony
- Threat Level 5
- Tolchock
- Under The Noise
- Unit:187
- Unitcode:Machine
- Urania
- Vaselyne
- Zentriert ins Antlitz
