= Daniel Vahnke discography =

- Studio albums: 13
- Compilation albums: 1
- Instrumental albums: 1
- Other appearances: 21

This article details the complete oeuvre of Canadian composer Daniel Vahnke. Between 1990 and 1996, Vahnke released six full-length studio albums both independently pressed and through a record label. Five of them were released as Vampire Rodents albums and one was ostensibly a solo album titled Papa Woody, which released under the name Ether Bunny.

Vahnke formed Vampire Rodents with keyboardist Victor Wulf in 1989 to serve as an outlet for their sound collage experiments. In 1990, they debuted with War Music, which was issued independently by their own label V.R. Productions and showcased their irreverent approach to industrial rock. Their second record, Premonition, was released in 1992 and adopted a more experimental sound, with violinist/cellist Andrea Akastia helping the duo to expand their musical pallet. Based on the creative success of that album, Vampire Rodents were signed to Re-Constriction Records.

Lullaby Land, released in 1993, became the group's first critical success. Vampire Rodents became an outlet for Vahnke's solo work and he decided to take a more commercial electro-industrial approach with the beat-driven Clockseed, which incorporated dense string and horn arrangements and a plethora of guest vocalists. He released two albums through Fifth Colvmn Records in 1996: Gravity's Rim, which further experimented with the song format, and Papa Woody, Vahnke's personal tribute to big band and bebop music that had been in the works since 1993. After experiencing legal disputes with Fifth Colvmn, Vahnke retreated from the music scene and announced his retirement in 2009. In 2017 Vahnke released the sixth Vampire Rodents album Noises in the Wall and the second Ether Bunny album Attention Please on his Rodentia Productions Bandcamp. He continued to relaease projects into 2020, including: Music for Player Piano, Early Soundtrack Sketches, Vol. I, Early Soundtrack Sketches, Vol. II, Axon Tremolo, Gravity's Rim (Instrumental Version), Cut to the Chase and ElevatorMan.

== Discography ==
=== As Daniel Vahnke ===
Studio albums
Title	Album details
Music for Player Piano	Released: June 30, 2018; Label: Rodentia Productions; Formats: DL

Compilation albums
Title	Album details
Early Soundtrack Sketches, Vol. I	Released: August 1, 2018; Label: Rodentia Productions; Formats: DL
Early Soundtrack Sketches, Vol. II	Released: August 1, 2018; Label: Rodentia Productions; Formats: DL

=== As Vampire Rodents ===
Studio albums
Title	Album details
War Music	Released: August 20, 1990 (US); Label: V.R.; Formats: CS, CD
Premonition	Released: May 19, 1992 (US); Label: V.R.; Formats: CD
Lullaby Land	Released: October 25, 1993 (US); Label: Re-Constriction; Formats: CD
Clockseed	Released: April 14, 1995 (US); Label: Re-Constriction; Formats: CD
Gravity's Rim	Released: May 14, 1996 (US); Label: Fifth Colvmn; Formats: CD
Noises in the Wall	Released: November 11, 2017; Label: Rodentia Productions; Formats: DL
Gravity's Rim (Instrumental Version)	Released: July 20, 2018; Label: Rodentia Productions; Formats: DL
Cut to the Chase	Released: November 12, 2019; Label: Rodentia Productions; Formats: DL

=== As Ether Bunny ===
Studio albums
Title	Album details
Papa Woody	Released: April 2, 1996 (US); Label: Fifth Colvmn; Formats: CD
Attention Please	Released: December 28, 2017; Label: Rodentia Productions; Formats: DL

=== With Axon Tremolo ===
Studio albums
Title	Album details
Axon Tremolo	Released: July 20, 2018; Label: Rodentia Productions; Formats: DL

=== As Elevator ManN ===
Studio albums
Title	Album details
ElevatorMan	Released: January 1, 2020; Label: Rodentia Productions; Formats: DL

== Compilation appearances ==
List of compilation appearances, with year of release, album title and song title
Year	Song	Album	Label
1991	"Success"	Mind Pollution (The First Installment)	Words of Warning
1991	"War Music"	RRR-Taste Test: 1991 – Vol 6	RRR
1992	"Burial at Sea"	The Cyberflesh conspiracy	If It Moves...
1992	"Babyface"	Dossiers	Dossier
1992	"Momentous"	Mechanics of Deconstruction	Technical Chaos
1992	"Babyface"	Sever Motor Discordia	Technical Chaos
1993	"Nose Dive"	Rivet Head Culture	If It Moves...
1994	"Bosch Erotique"	America the Beautiful	RRR
1994	"Catacomb"	Crowbar America	Re-Constriction
1994	"Lizardman"	Masked Beauty in a Sea of Sadness	Goth Industry
1994	"Zygote"	Scavengers in the Matrix	If It Moves...
1995	"Mother Tongue"	Chambermade	Re-Constriction
1995	"Another Planet"	Frostbyte (Re-Constriction Sampler)	Re-Constriction
1995	"Core"	Thugs 'n' Kisses	Re-Constriction
1996	"Dowager's Egg"	Built for Stomping: A Re-Constriction & Cleopatra Sampler	Re-Constriction
1996	"Blind Acceleration"	Fascist Communist Revolutionaries	Fifth Colvmn
1996	"Saturation"	Re-Constriction 10* Year Anniversary	Re-Constriction
1997	"Mother Tongue"	Got Moose? Re-Constriction CD Sampler #2	Re-Constriction
1997	"Schubert Trio in E-flat"	Vampire Themes	Cleopatra
1998	"Chain"	The Black Bible	Cleopatra
1998	"Schubert Trio in E-flat"	This Is Goth!	Cleopatra

== Soundtrack appearances ==
Year	Song	Film
1993	"Nosedive"	Totally Fucked Up

== Credits ==
Year	Artist	Release	Role(s)	Song(s)
1990	Vampire Rodents	War Music	sampler, guitar, vocals	—
1991	Vampire Rodents	Premonition	Sampler, guitar, bass guitar, keyboards, orchestration, vocals	—
1993	Vampire Rodents	Lullaby Land	Sampler, guitar, orchestration, vocals	—
1994	Various Artists	Masked Beauty in a Sea of Sadness	Sampler	"Lizardman"
1995	Various Artists	Thugs 'n' Kisses	Remixer	"Chemical Halo" (V. Rodents' Sax Mix)
1995	Vampire Rodents	Clockseed	Sampler, guitar	—
1995	Vampire Rodents	Clockseed	Vocals	"Downwind", "Floater", "Another Planet", "Tattoo Me"
1996	Vampire Rodents	Gravity's Rim	Sampler, guitar, bass guitar	—
1996	Vampire Rodents	Gravity's Rim	Vocals	"Prophet Clown", "Underneath", "Gravity's Rim", "Ice Borers", "Parameter Seven", "Obsidian", "Porker", "Creeper", "Albatross", "Fossilized"
1996	Ether Bunny	Papa Woody	Sampler	—
1996	Various Artists	Fascist Communist Revolutionaries	Sampler, guitar, bass guitar, vocals	"Blind Acceleration"
2017	Vampire Rodents	Noises in the Wall	Sampler	—
2018	Ether Bunny	Attention Please	Sampler	—
2018	Axon Tremolo	Axon Tremolo	Sampler	—
2018	Axon Tremolo	Axon Tremolo	Vocals	"Haven", "Axis", "Free Again", "Sky Wide Open", "Focus", "Horizon", "Sleepy Boat to Heaven"
2018	Vampire Rodents	Gravity's Rim (Instrumental Version)	Sampler	—
2018	Daniel Vahnke	Early Soundtrack Sketches, Vol. I	Sampler	—
2018	Daniel Vahnke	Early Soundtrack Sketches, Vol. II	Synthesizers	—
2018	Daniel Vahnke	Early Soundtrack Sketches, Vol. II	Piano	"Piano Room #13", "Piano Room #12", "Piano Room #11", "Piano Room #10"
2018	Daniel Vahnke	Early Soundtrack Sketches, Vol. II	Sampler	"Down to Business", "Rat Nest I & IV"
2018	Daniel Vahnke	Music for Player Piano	Piano	—
2019	Vampire Rodents	Cut to the Chase	Sampler	—
2019	Vampire Rodents	Cut to the Chase	Remixer	"Chemical Halo" (V. Rodents' Sax Mix), "Gout" (V. Rodents' Mix), "Good Vibrations" (V. Rodents' Mix), "Combine" (V. Rodents' Mix), "Valentine" (V. Rodents' Mix), "Reconciled" (V. Rodents' Mix)
2019	Vampire Rodents	Cut to the Chase	Vocals	"Cut to the Chase", "Blind Acceleration", "Lizardman"
2020	Elevator ManN	ElevatorMan	Vocals	—
