= Cut to the Chase (Vampire Rodents album) =

Compilation album by Vampire Rodents
- Released: November 12, 2019
- Recorded: 1993 – 1995
- Genre: Sound collage; industrial rock
- Length: 60:10
- Label: Rodentia Productions

Vampire Rodents chronology
Gravity's Rim (Instrumental Version) (2018)	Cut to the Chase (2019)

Daniel Vahnke chronology
Early Soundtrack Sketches, Vol. II (2018)	Cut to the Chase (2019)	ElevatorMan (2020)

Cut to the Chase is a compilation album by Vampire Rodents, released on November 12, 2019, by Rodentia Productions. The album compiles tracks from outside the band's main discography, namely the previously unreleased songs "Cut to the Chase", "Henry Catwallace", "Lizardman" and "Blind Acceleration", remixed tracks by Chemlab, Killing Floor and Penal Colony and the song "Cocked, Loaded & Ready" with the original opening intact.

== Track listing ==
No.	Title	Lyrics	Music	Artist	Length
1.	"Cut to the Chase"	Daniel Vahnke	Daniel Vahnke	Vampire Rodents	2:50
2.	"Henry Catwallace"		Vahnke	Ether Bunny	4:20
3.	"Chemical Halo" (V. Rodents' Sax Mix)	Jared Louche	Dylan Thomas More	Chemlab	4:30
4.	"Blind Acceleration"	Vahnke	Vahnke	Vampire Rodents	2:41
5.	"Lizardman"	Vahnke	Vahnke; Victor Wulf	Vampire Rodents	4:36
6.	"Cocked, Loaded & Ready"	Mel Hammond	Vahnke	Vampire Rodents	4:31
7.	"Gout" (V. Rodents' Mix)	Dee Madden	Jason Hubbard; Dee Madden; Andy Shaw; Chris Shinkus	Penal Colony	3:01
8.	"Good Vibrations" (V. Rodents' Mix)	Brian Wilson	Brian Wilson	Fleshhouse	4:58
9.	"Combine" (V. Rodents' Mix)	Madden	Hubbard; Madden; Shaw; Shinkus	Penal Colony	3:44
10.	"Valentine" (V. Rodents' Mix)	Christian Void	James Basore; John Belew; Christian Void; Marc Phillips; Karl Tellefsen	Killing Floor	5:10
11.	"Reconciled" (V. Rodents' Mix)	Madden	Hubbard; Madden; Shaw; Shinkus	Penal Colony	4:44
12.	"Clockseed" (Alt Vox Take)	Dave Creadeau; Boom chr Paige	Vahnke	Vampire Rodents	4:25
13.	"Heliopause" (Alt Vox Take)	Madden	Vahnke	Vampire Rodents	2:50
14.	"Dowager's Egg" (Lo Vox Mix)	Christian Void	Vahnke	Vampire Rodents	2:57
15.	"Chemical Halo" (Loud Sax Mix)	Louche	More	Chemlab	4:44

== Personnel ==
Adapted from the Cut to the Chase liner notes.

Axon Tremolo

- Daniel Vahnke – sampler, remixer (3, 7–11, 14, 15), vocals (1, 4, 5)
- Victor Wulf – keyboards (5)

Additional performers

- James Basore – drums, drum programming and tape (10)
- John Belew – sampler, electronics, programming (10)
- Marc C. Bennett – guitar (6)
- Chase – percussion and loops (1, 2, 4, 6, 12–14)
- Dave Creadeau – vocals (12)
- Mark Edwards – sampler and vocals (8)
- Mel Hammond – vocals (6)
- Jason Hubbard – sampler, programming and drum programming (7, 9, 11)
- Mark Kermanj – drums (3, 15)
- Jared Louche – arrangements and vocals (3, 15)
- Dee Madden – vocals (7, 9, 11, 13), sampler and programming (7, 9, 11)
- Boom chr Paige – vocals (12)
- Marc Phillips – guitar, bass guitar and backing vocals (10)
- Dylan Thomas More – programming, loops and sampler (3, 15)
- Andy Shaw – guitar and backing vocals (7, 9, 11)
- Chris Shinkus – bass guitar and backing vocals (7, 9, 11)
- Karl Tellefsen – guitar and bass guitar (10)
- Ned Wahl – bass guitar (3, 15)
- Steve "Fly" Watson – guitar (3, 15)
- Christian Void – vocals (10, 14), sampler and electronics (10)

Production

- Joan McAninch – engineering (6, 12–14), mastering (6)
- Neil Wojewodzki – editing, mastering, mixing (6) post-mastering (6)

== Release history ==
Region	Date	Label	Format
United States	2019	Rodentia Productions	DL
