= The Truth Hurts 1985–2000 =

Compilation album by Dessau
- Released: July 28, 2009
- Genre: Industrial rock
- Length: 74:32
- Label: WTII
- Producer: Paul Barker; Van Christie; John Elliott; Martin Hannett; Tom Harding; Jason McNinch; Giles Reaves

Dessau chronology
Dessau (1995)	The Truth Hurts 1985–2000 (2009)

The Truth Hurts 1985–2000 is a compilation album by Dessau, released on July 28, 2009, by Mausoleum. The album packages tracks from band's first two EPs, four previously unreleased songs produced by Paul Barker, alternate mixes and two live covers of Joy Division and New Order.

== Reception ==
Connexion Bizarre criticized The Truth Hurts 1985–2000 for being a poorly assembled collection and said "it's perfectly passable industrial of a kind that is all but history now, but the thing is, others did it better." Fabryka Music Magazine awarded the collection a perfect rating of four out of four stars.

== Track listing ==
All tracks are written by John Elliott, except "Isolation" by Ian Curtis, Bernard Sumner, Peter Hook and Stephen Morris.

No.	Title	Writer(s)	Album (date)	Length
1.	"On the Banks of the Wabash, Far Away" (Indiana University Marching Hundred cover)	Paul Dresser	World War Underground (1996)	3:38
2.	"Revenge" (Ministry cover)	Al Jourgensen	Another Prick in the Wall – A Tribute to Ministry – Volume 2 (1999)	4:28
3.	"The Sun"	Paul Barker; John Elliott	Details Sketchy (1995)	5:36
4.	"Chalkline"	Van Christie; Jason McNinch	Details Sketchy (1995)	5:07
5.	"Trevethan"	Barker; J. Elliott		3:18
6.	"Blackball"	Barker; Clay Brocker; Mike Orr		4:08
7.	"Rest My Eyes"	Barker; Barry Nelson; Orr		4:15
8.	"Seldom Traveled"	Barker; J. Elliott		4:20
9.	"Suffer"	J. Elliott; Nelson; Orr	Dessau (1995)	3:25
10.	"Beijing"	J. Elliott; Nelson; Orr	Exercise in Tension (1989)	5:44
11.	"Unshakeable"	J. Elliott	Happy Mood (1985)	3:20
12.	"Europe Light"	J. Elliott	Happy Mood (1985)	3:30
13.	"Imperial Hotel"	J. Elliott	Happy Mood (1985)	4:34
14.	"Crutch of Utitlity"	J. Elliott; Kim Ervin Elliott	Red Languages (1985)	4:31
15.	"Red Languages"	J. Elliott; K. Elliott	Red Languages (1985)	4:47
16.	"Isolation" (live) (Joy Division cover)	Ian Curtis; Peter Hook; Stephen Morris; Bernard Sumner		5:06
17.	"Ceremony" (live) (New Order cover)	Curtis; Hook; Morris; Sumner		4:45

== Personnel ==
Adapted from the liner notes of The Truth Hurts 1985–2000.

Dessau

- John Elliott – vocals (1–3, 5–17), programming (1–10, 12–14), percussion (14, 15), drums (11), piano (15), keyboards (17), production (1, 2, 10, 16, 17), mixing (1, 2, 9, 12)

Additional performers

- Steve Anderson – guitar (5, 7)
- Paul Barker – production (5–8), recording (5–8), mixing (5–8), bass guitar (3, 5, 7, 8), programming (5), guitar (8)
- Robert Benjamin – guitar (1, 2)
- Patrick Benson – drums (15, 17)
- Frank Brodlo – bass guitar (11)
- Clay Brocker – vocals (7)
- Van Christie – production, recording, mixing and programming (3, 4)
- Dave D'eath – bass guitar (1, 2, 16), arrangements (1, 2)
- Kim Ervin Elliott – vocals (14, 15)
- Mike Griffith – saxophone (9), recording (10)
- Lynn Green – percussion (3)
- Tom Gregory – percussion, production, recording and mixing (13)
- Kevin Hamilton – guitar (14)
- James Horn – bass guitar (14)
- Jim Marcus – programming (4)
- Jason McNinch – production, recording, mixing and programming (3, 4)
- Barry Nelson – bass guitar (6, 9, 10)
- Skot Nelson – guitar (11, 13, 15, 17)
- Richard Patrick – guitar (9)
- Mike Orr – guitar (6, 9, 10) vocals (9, 10), bass guitar (13, 15, 17)
- Andy Schmidt – guitar (12)
- Norm Rau – guitar (3, 16), vocals (3)
- Terry Townson – horn (7)
- Jason Williams – keyboards (1, 2)

Production and design

- Art of the Groove – art direction, design
- Tom Der – recording (11, 14, 15), piano (11)
- Robb Earls – recording (5–9, 12), mixing (7, 8, 12), production (9, 12)
- Martin Hannett – production and mixing (14, 15)
- Tom Harding – production, recording and mixing (13)
- Mark McCleerey – recording, mixing and programming (1, 2)
- John Trevethan – mastering, editing, programming (5)
- Rick Will – mixing (10)

== Release history ==
Region	Date	Label	Format	Catalog
United States	2009	WTII	CD	WTII053
