= Dessau (Dessau album) =

Studio album by Dessau
- Released: November 21, 1995
- Studio: LSI; Sixteenth Avenue Sound; Sound Vortex; Studio 19; (Nashville, Tennessee)
- Genre: Industrial rock
- Length: 58:49
- Label: Mausoleum
- Producer: Paul Barker; John Elliott; Al Jourgensen; Giles Reaves

Dessau chronology
Details Sketchy (1995)	Dessau (1995)	The Truth Hurts 1985-2000 (2009)

Dessau is the second studio album by Dessau, released on November 21, 1995 by Mausoleum.

== Music ==
Dessau contained previously unreleased recordings with material the band had released previously. "Suffer" was released on the WTII Records 2014 Free Sampler and a remix was released on Fifth Colvmn Records' Fascist Communist Revolutionaries compilation prior to Dessau's release. "Beijing" and the band's cover of Joy Division's "Isolation", which had become a minor hits for the band, were previously released on their 1989 studio album Exercise in Tension. "Isolation" was recorded in 1988 and produced by Paul Barker of Revolting Cocks and Al Jourgensen of Ministry. The cover has been released as a 12" single and on three various artists compilations: C'Est La Silenz Qui Fait La Musique... (1994, Electro Pulse), CDPRO Vol #13 (June 1996) (1996, EMI Music Canada) and Down & Dirty (1999, Pet Rock).

== Reception ==
Professional ratings
Review scores
Source	Rating
Allmusic	1.5/5 stars

Tim Griggs of AllMusic gave Dessau a negative review, calling the material "tired" and that "most of the tracks are mindless screamfests that don't seem to go anywhere."

== Track listing ==
All tracks are written by John Elliott, except "Isolation" by Ian Curtis, Bernard Sumner, Peter Hook and Stephen Morris.

No.	Title	Length
1.	"Suffer"	4:14
2.	"Thanksgiving"	4:59
3.	"Spinning on My Head"	5:19
4.	"Move Seoul"	3:19
5.	"Skeletons By Nature"	6:14
6.	"Isolation" (Joy Division cover)	5:05
7.	"Cull"	3:45
8.	"No Way"	3:34
9.	"Sun 90"	4:35
10.	"Party Zone"	4:32
11.	"Beijing"	5:51
12.	"Unshakeable" (Remix)	7:22

== Personnel ==
Adapted from the Dessau liner notes.

Dessau

- John Elliott – programming, keyboards, drums, vocals, production (2, 4, 5, 8, 11), mixing (2, 4, 5, 8)
- Mike Orr – vocals (1, 2, 4, 5, 8, 11), guitar (1, 4, 6, 8, 11), bass guitar (2, 5), melodica (6), mixing (4, 8)
- Norm Rau – guitar, percussion, vocals, mixing (4, 8)

Additional performers

- Luc van Acker – loops (12)
- Steve Anderson – guitar (10)
- Brooks – guitar (7)
- Frank Brodlo – bass guitar (12)
- Lynn Green – percussion (3, 9)
- Griff & Hans – Sony Walkman (1)
- Price Harrison – backing vocals (5)
- Barry Nelson – bass guitar (1, 4, 6, 8, 11)
- Skot Nelson – guitar (tracks: 2, 5, 12)
- Matt Swanson – Sony Walkman (1)
- Giles Reaves – percussion (2), recording (4), programming and instruments (5)
- Terry Townson – horn (7)
- Rick Will – instruments (4)

Production and design

- Paul Barker – mixing (1, 6, 7, 10, 12), production (1, 3, 6, 7, 9, 10, 12), recording (1, 3, 7, 9, 10), additional recording (6, 12), programming (3, 10), bass guitar (7, 9), guitar (9)
- Bill Brunt – cover art, design
- Tom Der – recording (2, 5, 12)
- Robb Earls – recording (1, 3, 7, 9, 10), mixing (1, 10)
- Brian Hardin – assisitant mixing (11)
- Steven Jacaruso – art direction, design
- Julian Herzfeld – assisitant mixing (12)
- Mike Griffith – additional recording (3, 9), recording (11)
- Rich Jegens – photography
- Al Jourgensen – production and mixing (6, 12), guitar and programming (6), recording (12)
- Peter Nash – photography
- Jeff "Critter" Newell – assisitant mixing (7)
- Mike Poole – recording (4, 6, 8)
- Giles Reaves – mixing (2–5, 8, 9), production (4, 8)
- Steve Spapperi – additional recording and assistant mixing (6)

== Release history ==
Region	Date	Label	Format	Catalog
United States	1995	Mausoleum	CD	71278-60016
Germany	1996	Mausoleum	CD	904176.2
