= Gravity's Rim (Instrumental Version) =

Studio album by Vampire Rodents
- Released: July 20, 2018
- Recorded: 1994 – 1996
- Genre: Modern classical; electronic; industrial rock
- Length: 69:11
- Label: Rodentia Productions

Daniel Vahnke chronology
Noises in the Wall (2017)	Gravity's Rim (Instrumental Version) (2018)	Cut to the Chase (2019)

Daniel Vahnke chronology
Axon Tremolo (2018)	Gravity's Rim (Instrumental Version) (2018)	Early Soundtrack Sketches, Vol. I (2018)

Gravity's Rim (Instrumental Version) is a studio album by Vampire Rodents, released on July 20, 2018, by Rodentia Productions. It contains non-vocal versions of tracks from Vampire Rodents sixth studio album Gravity's Rim, including the tracks "Blind Acceleration", originally from the 1996 various artists compilation album Fascist Communist Revolutionaries, and "Smartass", an unreleased track listed on the album's back cover as its coda. Composer Daniel Vahnke had originally planned to issue the music on compact disc in late 1996 or early in 1997 but Fifth Colvmn Records went bankrupt and album's release date was cancelled.

== Track listing ==
All music is composed by Daniel Vahnke.

No.	Title	Length
1.	"Calibrations" (Instrumental Version)	2:50
2.	"Ice Borers" (Instrumental Version)	2:20
3.	"Gravitys Rim" (Instrumental Version)	3:33
4.	"Underneath" (Instrumental Version)	3:17
5.	"Rain Wheel" (Instrumental Version)	3:11
6.	"Prophet Clown" (Instrumental Version)	3:43
7.	"Chain" (Instrumental Version)	2:56
8.	"Obsidian" (Instrumental Version)	2:07
9.	"The Happy Box" (Instrumental Version)	3:27
10.	"Parameter Seven" (Instrumental Version)	2:41
11.	"Patterns" (Instrumental Version)	2:56
12.	"Porker" (Instrumental Version)	3:39
13.	"Sandtrap" (Alternate Mix)	2:14
14.	"Core" (Instrumental Version)	3:11
15.	"Creeper" (Instrumental Version)	2:46
16.	"Schlangenauge" (Alternate Mix)	2:20
17.	"Fossilized" (Instrumental Version)	2:05
18.	"Albatross" (Instrumental Version)	3:11
19.	"A Perfect Lawn" (Alternate Mix)	1:49
20.	"Goatweed" (Instrumental Version)	2:55
21.	"Evasion" (Instrumental Version)	2:25
22.	"H.M.P." (Alternate Master)	3:22
23.	"Blind Acceleration" (Instrumental Version)	2:53
24.	"Smartass" (Instrumental Version)	3:05

== Personnel ==
Adapted from the Gravity's Rim (Instrumental Version) liner notes.

Axon Tremolo

- Daniel Vahnke – sampler, guitar, bass guitar

Additional performers

- Chase – percussion loops

Production

- Judson Leach – mixing (5, 6, 12, 14, 21, 22), mastering (22)
- Neil Wojewodzki – mastering, editing (2, 4, 5, 7–9, 11, 15, 16–19, 24), mixing (1–4, 7–11, 13, 15–19, 20, 23, 24)

== Release history ==
Region	Date	Label	Format
United States	2018	Rodentia Productions	DL
