= Premonition (Vampire Rodents album) =

Studio album by Vampire Rodents
- Released: May 19, 1992
- Recorded: 1991 – September 10, 1991
- Genres: Industrial; experimental rock
- Length: 70:22
- Label: V.R.

Vampire Rodents chronology
War Music (1990)	Premonition (1992)	Lullaby Land (1993)

Premonition is the second studio album by Vampire Rodents, released on May 19, 1992, by V.R. Productions. The album represented a musical shift for the band with the introduction of string instruments and further influence of classical music in the compositions. The album contains the most writing credits for composer Victor Wulf, who composed the music for five out of its twenty-one tracks.

== Music ==
The album features a heavy use of sound samples in many songs, which was a very prevalent trend in industrial music at the time. Samples used includes assorted Looney Tunes voice clips, dialogue from the horror film The Exorcist as well as narration from H.G. Wells' War of the Worlds. The album is roughly half compositions containing vocals and half not. It was at this point in Vampire Rodents existence that Daniel Vahnke expressed that the vocals were the weakest part of their compositions and that he desired the contributions of more vocalists.

The drum loop on "Babelchop" is taken from "Music to Save the World By", the 1981 synth-pop track by Alan Burnham. The second track, "Babyface", is a reimagining of Little Richard's song of the same name with altered lyrics.

== Release ==
Premonition was originally produced in truncated form on cassette with a runtime of approximately thirty minutes. The album was self-released by V.R. Productions and mailed from Daniel Vahnke for a limited time. The CD gathered the band enough attention for them to be noticed by and signed to Re-Constriction Records. The album's coda, "Colonies", later appeared on Victor Wulf's debut solo album Cyclos, which was released under the name Dilate.

After Vampire Rodents disbanded plans were made to re-issue the album packaged with their studio debut War Music and an expanded track listing, including the unreleased songs "Lizardman", "Blind Acceleration", "Smartass", "Harelip", and "Annexation II". Premonition was instead released on Bandcamp in 2019 with "Lizardman", originally released on the Masked Beauty in a Sea of Sadness various artists compilation, and alternate mastered versions of the songs "Babyface" and "Burial at Sea".

== Reception ==
The music magazine Industrialnation praised the dark atmosphere of Premonition and said "Vampire Rodents sound like the soundtrack to Clive Barker's most unimaginable sadomasochistic Cenobite." The magazine went on to praise the compositions' use of cartoon samples, noting "Ovulation" as an example, and the vocal delivery of the lyrics. Technology Works also commended the band's use of samples, especially Bugs Bunny, and described the album as a "well-produced, abrasive-yet-accessible audio nightmare." For Crying Out Loud called the album "an unearthly awe-inspiring series of tunes" and a "true conjuring of industrial with elements of classical along with other unique brands of style." Option pointed to the "jittery collage-styled music" as being the praise-worthy aspect of the album." The magazine Skin Trade moderately criticized Vampire Rodent's over-depended on sampling and indicated that compositions like "Annexation" better utilize their talents.

== Track listing ==
All lyrics are written by Daniel Vahnke, except "Babyface" by Benny Davis and "Sitio" by Victor Wulf; all music is composed by Daniel Vahnke, except where noted.

No.	Title	Music	Length
1.	"Babelchop"		4:37
2.	"Babyface" (Jan Garber cover)	Harry Akst	2:37
3.	"Monkeypump"		1:49
4.	"Recoil"	Victor Wulf	3:59
5.	"Ovulation"		2:46
6.	"Subspecies"		2:28
7.	"Burial at Sea"		4:24
8.	"Vulvasaurus"		1:17
9.	"Annexation"	Wulf	3:37
10.	"Tenochtitlan"		1:39
11.	"Dresden"		4:50
12.	"Sitio"	Wulf	4:01
13.	"Deicide"		3:50
14.	"Infection"		2:35
15.	"Rodentia Ostinati I & III"		2:05
16.	"Dante's Shroud"		2:18
17.	"Waterhead"		3:40
18.	"Demon est Deus inversus"		2:17
19.	"Book of Job"	Wulf	4:36
20.	"Apparition"		2:37
21.	"Colonies"	Wulf	8:23

2019 digital re-issue
No.	Title	Music	Length
1.	"Apparition"		2:37
2.	"Colonies"	Victor Wulf	8:23
3.	"Book of Job"	Wulf	4:35
4.	"Demon est Deus inversus"		2:16
5.	"Dante's Shroud"		2:17
6.	"Waterhead"		3:39
7.	"Rodentia Ostinati I & III"		2:04
8.	"Infection"		2:34
9.	"Deicide"		3:50
10.	"Sitio"	Wulf	4:00
11.	"Dresden"		4:49
12.	"Annexation"	Wulf	3:37
13.	"Tenochtitlan"		1:38
14.	"Vulvasaurus"		1:16
15.	"Burial at Sea"		4:24
16.	"Subspecies"		2:27
17.	"Ovulation"		2:45
18.	"Recoil"	Wulf	3:58
19.	"Monkeypump"		1:48
20.	"Baby Face" (Jan Garber cover)	Harry Akst	2:35
21.	"Babelchop"		4:45
22.	"Lizardman"	Vahnke; Wulf	4:51
23.	"Rodentia Ostinati II & IV"		2:18
24.	"Babyface" (Jan Garber cover; Alternate Master)	Akst	2:32
25.	"Burial at Sea" (Alternate Master)		4:26

== Personnel ==
Adapted from the Premonition liner notes.

Vampire Rodents

- Daniel Vahnke (as Anton Rathausen) – guitar, bass guitar, sampler, keyboards, orchestration, vocals (5, 8, 9, 11, 15, 16, 18, 20, 21)
- Victor Wulf – keyboards, vocals (12)

Additional musicians

- Andrea Akastia – cello, violin
- Mark Edwards – vocals (19)
- Jing Laoshu – percussion

== Release history ==
Region	Date	Label	Format	Catalog
United States	1991	V.R.	CS	VR4
United States	1992	V.R.	CD	VR4
