= Clockseed =

Studio album by Vampire Rodents
- Released: April 7, 1995
- Length: 68:39
- Label: Re-Constriction
- Producer: Joan McAninch

Vampire Rodents chronology
Lullaby Land (1993)	Clockseed (1995)	Gravity's Rim (1996)

Daniel Vahnke chronology
Lullaby Land (1993)	Clockseed (1995)	Papa Woody (1996)

Professional ratings
Review scores
Source	Rating
AllMusic	3/5 stars

Clockseed is the fourth studio album by Vampire Rodents, released on April 7, 1995, by Re-Constriction Records.

== Music and lyrics ==
Clockseed has a larger number of guest vocalists than its predecessor, with Daniel handling vocal duties on only four out of twenty-two tracks. All the vocalists involved were known through Chase, who sent out tapes to anyone who could lend their lyrics and vocals to a track. Daniel has noted that they all wrote their parts completely without his direction and called it a great fortune to receive such incredible results from people he had never met.

During the album's production, Re-Constriction Records label manager Chase mailed instrumental tapes to multiple musicians affiliated with the electro-industrial and Rivethead scenes for them to layer vocals and lyrics over. Christian Void of Killing Floor received the tracks for "Dowager's Egg" and "Mother Tongue" and chose the former to compose with. Concerning the lyrical content, Void stated "It is about people with disease like HIV and AIDS and how the public perceives them, and about things that happen to them because of their disease" that decries people being made into pariahs by society. Written by Chemlab vocalist Jared Louche, "Low Orbit" is about two of his deceased friend appearing to him in his sleep. He has said the song was "influenced by my having had a series of dreams involving Craig and another friend who had died of a brain tumor around that time. They were haunting the orbits of my dreams." Jason Bazinet of SMP (Sounds of Mass Production) has voiced his displeasure with his and Sean's work on "Revisioned", noting that they may have rushed the lyrics. It is about people with disease like HIV and AIDS and how the public perceives them, and about things that happen to them because of their disease.

== Release and reception ==
Despite being out of print, the album can still be bought through the Vampire Rodents eBay page.

Aiding & Abetting gave it a positive review, saying that "while a little more accessible than Lullaby Land, Clockseed is still a compendium of discord and sonic discrepancies."

== Track listing ==
All music is composed by Daniel Vahnke, except "Annexation II" by Victor Wulf and "Chemical Halo" (V. Rodents' Sax Mix) by Jared Louche and Dylan Thomas More.

No.	Title	Lyrics/Vocals	Length
1.	"Dowager's Egg"	Christian Void	2:58
2.	"Skin Walker"	Sarah Folkman	2:47
3.	"Low Orbit"	Jared Louche	3:45
4.	"Downwind"	Daniel Vahnke	2:43
5.	"Mother Tongue"	Eric Powell	3:10
6.	"Heliopause"	Dee Madden	2:41
7.	"Floater"	Daniel Vahnke	3:33
8.	"Scatter"	Jim Coursey & Mark Edwards	2:37
9.	"Zygote"	Dan Gatto	4:01
10.	"Revisioned"	Jason Bazinet & Sean Ivy	2:50
11.	"Unmoved"	Rey Osburn	2:44
12.	"Cocked, Loaded & Ready"	Mel Hammond	3:40
13.	"Another Planet"	Daniel Vahnke	3:46
14.	"Saturation"	Steven Seibold	2:49
15.	"Clockseed"	Dave Creadeau & Boom chr Paige	4:19
16.	"Terra Amata"	Linda LeSabre	5:33
17.	"Tattoo Me"	Daniel Vahnke	4:05
18.	"Ravages of Ease"	Maria Azevedo	2:42
19.	"Teapot"	Hae Su Oh	2:39
20.	"Iron Clad"	Blake Barnes	2:49
21.	"Tenochtitlan II"	Pall Jenkins	2:02
22.	"Little Canoe"	Betty Martinez	0:15

2019 Digital Re-Issue
No.	Title	Lyrics/Vocals	Length
1.	"Dowagers Egg"	Christian Void	2:57
2.	"Skin Walker"	Sarah Folkman	2:47
3.	"Low Orbit"	Jared Louche	3:45
4.	"Downwind"	Daniel Vahnke	2:43
5.	"Mother Tongue"	Eric Powell	3:10
6.	"Heliopause"	Dee Madden	2:41
7.	"Floater"	Daniel Vahnke	3:33
8.	"Scatter"	Jim Coursey & Mark Edwards	2:37
9.	"Zygote"	Dan Gatto	4:00
10.	"Revisioned"	Jason Bazinet & Sean Ivy	2:44
11.	"Unmoved"	Rey Osburn	2:50
12.	"Cocked"	Mel Hammond	3:40
13.	"Another Planet"	Daniel Vahnke	3:46
14.	"Saturation"	Steven Seibold	2:49
15.	"Clockseed"	Dave Creadeau & Boom chr Paige	4:19
16.	"Terra Amata"	Linda LeSabre	5:33
17.	"Tattoo Me"	Daniel Vahnke	4:05
18.	"Ravages of Ease"	Maria Azevedo	2:42
19.	"Teapot"	Hae Su Oh	2:39
20.	"Iron Clad"	Blake Barnes	2:49
21.	"Tenochtitlan II"	Pall Jenkins	2:02
22.	"Blind Acceleration"	Daniel Vahnke	2:53
23.	"Little Canoe"	Betty Martinez	0:15
24.	"Annexation II"	Pall Jenkins	3:21
25.	"Chemical Halo" (V. Rodents' Sax Mix)	Jared Louche	4:48
26.	"Dowagers Egg" (Alternate Master)	Christian Void	2:58
27.	"Zygote" (Alternate Master)	Dan Gatto	4:01
28.	"Core" (Alternate Master)	Athan Maroulis	3:10
29.	"Mother Tongue" (Alternate Master)	Eric Powell	3:10
30.	"Saturation" (Alternate Master)	Steven Seibold	2:50

== Accolades ==
Year	Publication	Country	Accolade	Rank
1995	CMJ New Music Monthly	United States	"Dance"	22
"*" denotes an unordered list.

== Personnel ==
Adapted from the Clockseed liner notes.

Vampire Rodents

- Andrea Akastia – cello, violin
- Jing Laoshu – percussion
- Daniel Vahnke (as Anton Rathausen) – sampler, guitar, lead vocals (4, 7, 13, 17)
- Victor Wulf – piano, synthesizer

Production

- Trevor Henthorn – additional production (19)
- Robin James – cover art, illustrations
- Joan McAninch – production, engineering, mastering
- Jeff Motch – design
- Timothy Wiles (as Q) – mixing (2)

Additional musicians

- Maria Azevedo – lead vocals (18)
- Blake Barnes – lead vocals (20)
- Jason Bazinet – lead vocals and scratching (10)
- Chase – loops, design
- Dave Creadeau – lead vocals (15)
- Mark Edwards – lead vocals (8)
- Sarah Folkman – lead vocals (2)
- Dan Gatto – lead vocals (9)
- Mel Hammond – lead vocals (12)
- Sean Ivy – lead vocals and scratching (10)
- Pall Jenkins – lead vocals (21)
- Tony Lash – electric guitar (5)
- Linda LeSabre – lead vocals (16)
- Jared Louche – lead vocals (3)
- Dee Madden – lead vocals (6)
- Betty Martinez – lead vocals (22)
- Hae Su Oh – lead vocals (19)
- Rey Osburn – lead vocals (11)
- Boom chr Paige – lead vocals (15)
- Eric Powell – lead vocals (5)
- Steven Seibold – lead vocals (14)
- Christian Void – lead vocals (1)

== Release history ==
Region	Date	Label	Format	Catalog
United States	1995	Re-Constriction	CD	REC-017
