= Killing Floor =

Killing Floor may refer to:

== Music ==
- Killing Floor (British band), a British blues rock band
- Killing Floor (American band), an American electro-industrial group
  - Killing Floor (album), 1995
- Killing Floor, a 1992 album by Vigilantes of Love
- "Killing Floor" (song), by Howlin' Wolf, 1964
- "Killing Floor", a song on Redgum's 1978 album If You Don't Fight You Lose
- "Killin' Floor", a song on Body Count's 1992 album Body Count
- "Killing Floor", a song on Bruce Dickinson's 1998 album The Chemical Wedding
- "Killing Floor", a song on Black Stone Cherry's 2011 album Between the Devil & the Deep Blue Sea
- "The Killing Floor", a song on Lamb of God's 2026 album Into Oblivion

== Literature ==
- Killing Floor (novel), by Lee Child
- Killing Floor, a poetry collection by Ai

== Film and television ==
- The Killing Floor (1984 film), directed by Bill Duke
- The Killing Floor (2007 film), directed by Gideon Raff
- "Killing Floor" (Chancer), a 1990 television episode

== Other media ==
- Killing Floor (video game), a 2009 video game developed by Tripwire Studios based on an Unreal Tournament modification of the same name
  - Killing Floor 2, 2016 sequel
  - Killing Floor 3, 2025 sequel

== See also ==
- Slaughterhouse
