= Noises in the Wall =

Studio album by Vampire Rodents
- Released: November 11, 2017
- Recorded: 1993 – 1996
- Genre: Modern classical, electronic, industrial, sound collage
- Length: 87:56
- Label: Rodentia Productions

Vampire Rodents chronology
Gravity's Rim (1996)	Noises in the Wall (2017)	Gravity's Rim (Instrumental Version) (2018)

Daniel Vahnke chronology
Gravity's Rim (1996)	Noises in the Wall (2017)	Attention Please (2017)

Noises in the Wall is the sixth studio album by American experimental music band Vampire Rodents, released on November 11, 2017 by Rodentia Productions.

== Reception ==
The album received positive write-ups, with reviewers praising the wide scope of musical genres and styles such as the frantic industrial collage of "Good Humour", the eight-minute composition "Cyborghostsex" and Vahnke's interpretation of Schubert's "Piano Trio No. 2". The ten part suite "The Zombie Dolls" was particularly noted for expanding the band's range into cinematic music territory.

== Track listing ==
All music is composed by Daniel Vahnke, except "Good Humour" and "Itume" by Victor Wulf and "Piano Trio No. 2" by Franz Schubert.

No.	Title	Length
1.	"Asset by Diversion"	2:15
2.	"Apocalepsy"	2:24
3.	"Clueless"	3:43
4.	"Assemblage"	1:56
5.	"Rubenesque"	2:46
6.	"Goliath"	3:02
7.	"Cotopaxi"	1:26
8.	"Exostential"	3:11
9.	"Heap"	2:17
10.	"Ziggurat"	3:17
11.	"Halflife"	3:28
12.	"Lotus Seal"	2:43
13.	"Cyborghostsex"	8:32
14.	"Positive"	3:12
15.	"Vector"	3:51
16.	"Domino Effect"	3:00
17.	"Good Humour"	4:00
18.	"Imprint"	2:23
19.	"Insulated"	2:27
20.	"Reedmaker"	1:57
21.	"Mobilize"	2:14
22.	"Blue Room"	3:53
23.	"Rotator"	1:48
24.	"Variation on Schubert (Piano Trio No. 2, Op. 100)"	2:18
25.	"The Zombie Dolls: I. Deadpoolnet"	0:40
26.	"The Zombie Dolls: II. Slideshow"	1:16
27.	"The Zombie Dolls: III. Point"	2:21
28.	"The Zombie Dolls: IV. The Good Virus"	1:07
29.	"The Zombie Dolls: V. Phalanx"	1:48
30.	"The Zombie Dolls: VI. Cossack"	1:07
31.	"The Zombie Dolls: VII. 4-Ft. Space Station"	1:57
32.	"The Zombie Dolls: VIII. Hydraulic"	0:36
33.	"The Zombie Dolls: IX. Man Overbored"	0:49
34.	"The Zombie Dolls: X. Harelip"	0:58
35.	"Itume"	3:13

== Personnel ==
Vampire Rodents

- Daniel Vahnke – sampler, musical arrangements
- Victor Wulf – synthesizer and sampler (17, 35)

Production

- Neil Wojewodzki – mastering, editing

== Release history ==
Region	Date	Label	Format
United States	2017	Rodentia Productions	DL
