= Divide by Zero (album) =

Studio album by Killing Floor
- Released: September 23, 1997
- Recorded: Roof Brothers Studio (Oakland, CA)
- Genre: Electro-industrial
- Length: 46:07
- Label: Re-Constriction
- Producer: James Basore; John Belew; Marc Phillips; Josh Tobias Roberts; Karl Tellefsen; Christian Void

Killing Floor chronology
Killing Floor (1995)	Divide by Zero (1997)	Come Together (1998)

Divide by Zero is the second studio album by Killing Floor, released on September 23, 1997 by Re-Constriction Records.

== Reception ==
Professional ratings
Review scores
Source	Rating
Allmusic	2.5/5 stars

AllMusic gave Divide by Zero a mixed to negative marker of two and a half out of five stars. Aiding & Abetting gave the album a positive review, saying "Killing Floor uses everything to its advantage: riffage, throbbing rhythms, shouted vocals and a wonderful touch in the studio." and "seamless sound is good, as before, and the songs are able to merge the lyric and musical ideas much better than on the debut." Larry Miles of Black Monday called the album typical of the industrial genre, "aggressive, guitar driven and apocalyptic", while highlighting the band for "mixing an aggressive message with bone crushing punk tendencies." Fabryka Music Magazine gave the album four out of four and praised the mysterious cold wave atmosphere in compositions such as "Unity" as being the highlight of the album. Sonic Boom praised the band for their production quality and artistic growth, saying "ultimately fans of previous Killing Floor material will definitely enjoy this album while the musical diversity will cater to a much wider audience than before."

== Track listing ==
All lyrics are written by Christian Void; all music is composed by James Basore, John Belew, Marc Phillips, Karl Tellefsen and Christian Void, except "Unity" co-written with Arjan McNamara and Josh T. Roberts.

No.	Title	Length
1.	"Greetings and Salutations"	0:06
2.	"Twelve.Ten.Forty-Eight"	3:55
3.	"Divide by Zero"	4:43
4.	"About to Break"	2:44
5.	"Cold at Night"	5:00
6.	"Come Together"	3:16
7.	"Tear It All Away"	4:02
8.	"Wood"	2:47
9.	"Perfect World"	2:58
10.	"The Way It Goes"	2:05
11.	"Article One"	3:59
12.	"Unity" (Come Together Part 2)	5:32
13.	"Untitled"	4:56

== Personnel ==
Adapted from the Divide by Zero liner notes.

Killing Floor

- James Basore – drums, drum programming, tape, backing vocals, production, engineering, mixing, editing
- John Belew – sampler, synthesizer, programming, production, engineering, mixing, editing, design
- Marc Phillips – electric guitar, bass guitar, production, engineering, mixing, editing
- Karl Tellefsen – electric guitar, bass guitar, backing vocals, production, engineering, mixing, editing
- Christian Void – lead vocals, sampler, electronics, trumpet, production, engineering, mixing, editing

Production and additional personnel

- Matt Boudreau – mixing
- Walter Dahn – cover art
- Arjan McNamara – mastering, engineering and mixing (3)
- Matt Murman – mastering
- Josh Tobias Roberts – production, recording, engineering, mixing

== Release history ==
Region	Date	Label	Format	Catalog
United States	1997	Re-Constriction	CD	REC-025
