= Shadows in Blue =

Remix album by Penal Colony
- Released: February 27, 1995
- Genre: Electro-industrial
- Length: 33:14
- Label: Zoth Ommog

Penal Colony chronology
Multicoloured Shades (1995)	Shadows in Blue (1995)	Unfinished Business (2003)

Shadows in Blue is a remix album by Penal Colony, released on February 27, 1995 by Zoth Ommog Records

== Track listing ==
All tracks are written by Jason Hubbard, Dee Madden, Andy Shaw and Chris Shinkus

No.	Title	Remixer(s)	Length
1.	"Halidified (Burnt RAM)" (Stripped Goth Mix)	Leæther Strip	4:25
2.	"Blue 9" (Free Me Mix)	Front Line Assembly	5:43
3.	"Halidified" (Subgenius Mix)	Dee Madden	3:58
4.	"Among the Living" (Dominion of Noise Mix)	Mentallo & The Fixer	3:10
5.	"Product" (Crumpled Up Mix)	Mentallo & The Fixer	3:30
6.	"Extremist" (Parallel Mix)	Psychic TV	5:06
7.	"When the Veins..." (Fish Monkey Mix)	Psychic TV	7:22

== Personnel ==
Adapted from the Shadows in Blue liner notes.

Penal Colony

- Jason Hubbard – sampler, programming, drum programming
- Dee Madden – lead vocals, sampler, programming, design, remixing (3)
- Andy Shaw – electric guitar, backing vocals
- Chris Shinkus – bass guitar, backing vocals, design

Additional musicians

- Rhys Fulber – remixing (2)
- Gary Dassing – remixing (4, 5)
- Bill Leeb – remixing (2)
- Claus Larsen – remixing (1)
- Genesis P-Orridge – remixing (6, 7)
- Larry Thrasher – remixing (6, 7)

== Release history ==
Region	Date	Label	Format	Catalog
United States	1995	Zoth Ommog	CD	ZOT 135
