= Come Together (EP) =

EP by Killing Floor
- Released: February 10, 1998
- Genre: Electro-industrial
- Length: 19:09
- Label: Re-Constriction

Killing Floor chronology
Divide by Zero (1997)	Come Together (1998)

Come Together is an EP by Killing Floor, released on February 10, 1998 by Re-Constriction Records.

== Reception ==
Aiding & Abetting called Come Together "a remix set that is worth the cash" and "these reworkings do make solid and creative improvements on the originals." Larry Miles of Black Monday considered the release better than Killing Floor's second album, saying "lots o' guitar and madness abound create a single that is better than the full-length album and "If danceable, crunchy music is what your looking for, then Come Together is the single your in need of." Fabryka Music Magazine gave the album a mixed review of two out of four stars but credited the band for fitting comfortably within the Re-Constriction Records roster. Sonic Boom called the album "quite a radically different collection of remixes, each utilizing little original source material, making for quite a diverse selection of music."

== Track listing ==
All tracks are written by James Basore, John Belew, Marc Phillips, Karl Tellefsen and Christian Void.

No.	Title	Remixer(s)	Length
1.	"Come Together"		3:15
2.	"About to Break"		2:48
3.	"Tear It All Away" (Institute of Technology Remix)	Institute of Technology	4:12
4.	"About to Break" (Alien Faktor Remix)	Alien Faktor	4:44
5.	"Wood" (Christ Analogue Remix)	Christ Analogue	3:42
6.	"Jimmy and the Killing Floor" (Atomic)	Phobia	0:28

== Personnel ==
Adapted from the Come Together liner notes.

Killing Floor

- James Basore – instruments
- John Belew – instruments
- Marc Phillips – instruments
- Karl Tellefsen – instruments
- Christian Void – instruments

== Release history ==
Region	Date	Label	Format	Catalog
United States	1998	Re-Constriction	CD	CS REC-025
