= Papa Woody =

Studio album by Ether Bunny
- Released: April 2, 1996
- Recorded: 1993 – 1996
- Genre: Experimental big band, industrial, sound collage
- Length: 61:32
- Label: Fifth Colvmn

Ether Bunny chronology
Papa Woody (1996)	Attention Please (2017)

Daniel Vahnke chronology
Clockseed (1995)	Papa Woody (1996)	Gravity's Rim (1996)

Papa Woody is the first studio album by Ether Bunny, released on April 18, 1996 through Fifth Colvmn Records. Ether Bunny is the side project of Daniel Vahnke, the principal composer for Vampire Rodents.

== Recording ==
The project began in 1993 during the Lullaby Land recording sessions, intended as Vahnke's personal tribute to cartoon and jazz music.

== Music ==
Although sampling is still prevalent in the music, the album is notably more influenced by the big bands of the 1930s and 1940s than anything Vahnke released with Vampire Rodents. The work of Carl Stalling, a composer of cartoon scores, has been said to be a primary influence on Ether Bunny's sound. The project has also been compared to the work of Foetus and Jack Dangers, although overall coming across as a more "polite experience". Similar to the Vampire Rodent's discography, Ether Bunny's sound relies heavily on the use of the drum machine to produce dance rhythms, which Vahnke had hoped would help the music reach a younger audience. This decision has been criticized as sounding derivative and two dimensional as well as detracting from the overall song at times.

== Release and reception ==
Professional ratings
Review scores
Source	Rating
AllMusic	3/5 stars

Daniel Vahnke has called Papa Woody his favorite released project, even preferring it over his work in Vampire Rodents. Ned Raggett of AllMusic gave it three out of five stars, claiming that "Ether Bunny is onto something throughout its hour-long course" Aiding & Abetting gave it a more positive review, saying that each song is "demanding to be heard again and again" and praising "the artful way Vahnke splices solos and even full compositions into the same song, creating whole new improvisations."

== Track listing ==
All music is composed by Daniel Vahnke, except "Wee" by Jared Louche and Dylan Thomas More.

No.	Title	Length
1.	"Jolly Roger"	5:11
2.	"Papa Woody"	4:44
3.	"Chauncey Gardener"	5:05
4.	"Tar Baby"	4:04
5.	"Meerkats of Mu"	4:24
6.	"Flea Circus"	3:24
7.	"Reach"	3:11
8.	"Tinkerbell Tramp"	2:58
9.	"Wabbitpipe"	1:54
10.	"Crippled Cricket"	4:18
11.	"Closet Monster"	1:48
12.	"Froglegs"	2:48
13.	"Bring Presents"	1:24
14.	"Silly Willy"	1:13
15.	"Telepathetic"	1:59
16.	"Mr. Poopypants"	4:20
17.	"No Paquitos"	2:17
18.	"Wee"	1:34
19.	"Bunny Jump"	2:18
20.	"S.G.A.C."	2:30

2019 Digital Re-Issue
No.	Title	Length
1.	"Chauncey Gardener"	5:05
2.	"Papa Woody"	4:44
3.	"Reach"	3:11
4.	"Flea Circus"	3:24
5.	"Meerkats of Mu"	4:24
6.	"Jolly Roger"	5:11
7.	"Tar Baby"	4:04
8.	"Tinkerbell Tramp"	2:58
9.	"Crippled Cricket"	4:18
10.	"Closet Monster"	1:48
11.	"Wabbitpipe"	1:54
12.	"Frog Legs"	2:48
13.	"Bring Presents"	1:24
14.	"Silly Willy"	1:13
15.	"Telepathetic"	1:59
16.	"No Paquitos"	2:17
17.	"Mr. Poopypants"	4:20
18.	"Wee"	1:34
19.	"SGAC"	2:30
20.	"Bunny Jump"	2:18
21.	"Telepathetic" (Alternate mix)	2:00
22.	"Froglegs" (Alternate mix)	2:56

== Personnel ==
Adapted from the Papa Woody liner notes.

Ether Bunny

- Daniel Vahnke – sampler

Additional musicians

- Jared Louche (as Jared Hendrickson) – voice (18)
- Dylan Thomas More – programming (18)

Production

- Zalman Fishman – executive-producer
- Judson Leach – engineering, mixing

== Release history ==
Region	Date	Label	Format	Catalog
United States	1996	Fifth Colvmn	CD	9868-63218
