= Gravity's Rim =

Studio album by Vampire Rodents
- Released: May 14, 1996
- Recorded: 1996
- Genre: Modern classical, electronic
- Length: 62:47
- Label: Fifth Colvmn

Vampire Rodents chronology
Clockseed (1995)	Gravity's Rim (1996)	Noises in the Wall (2017)

Daniel Vahnke chronology
Papa Woody (1996)	Gravity's Rim (1996)	Noises in the Wall (2017)

Gravity's Rim is the fifth studio album by the American experimental music band Vampire Rodents, released on May 14, 1996, by Fifth Colvmn Records.

== Music and lyrics ==
Gravity's Rim returns to the pop format of the band's earlier albums as well as a more jazz oriented sound similar to Daniel Vahnke's Ether Bunny project. There are fewer guest vocalists compared to the previous album, with the focus shifting back to Vahnke's vocals and lyrics. Former collaborators contributed their vocals to the music, including Maria Azevedo, Boom chr Paige, Dave Creadeau, Mark Edwards and Jared Louche. Spahn Ranch vocalist Athan Maroulis also contributed vocals to four songs. Daniel was so pleased with Maria Azevedo's contributions that he considered starting a separate project with her band Battery.

== Release and reception ==
Professional ratings
Review scores
Source	Rating
AllMusic	3/5 stars

Despite being listed on the back cover, the track "Smartass" was left off due to the label being ready to press the record before the mastering process had been completed.

AllMusic critic Amy Hanson gave it three out of five stars, calling it "a triumph" and a "remarkable assimilation of sound, sonics, and scope" Aiding & Abetting gave it a positive review, saying "Vahnke has managed to vary his beat work even more (perhaps inspired by his recent Ether Bunny project), making the songs even more intriguing." Black Monday Magazine gave it a positive review as well, noting that "all the classic Rodentia elements are found: heavy beats, cellos, guitar, and it’s chock full of exotic sampling."

== Track listing ==
All music is composed by Daniel Vahnke, except "Piano Trio No. 2 in E-flat major, Op. 100, D. 929" by Franz Schubert.

No.	Title	Lyrics/Vocals	Length
1.	"Chain"	Athan Maroulis	2:56
2.	"Prophet Clown"	Daniel Vahnke	3:44
3.	"Beta"	Jared Louche	4:50
4.	"Underneath"	Daniel Vahnke	3:16
5.	"Rain Wheel"	Maria Azevedo	3:09
6.	"Gravity's Rim"	Daniel Vahnke	3:32
7.	"Calibrations"	Athan Maroulis	2:52
8.	"Ice Borers"	Daniel Vahnke	2:13
9.	"Code"	Jared Louche	2:10
10.	"Parameter Seven"	Daniel Vahnke	2:37
11.	"The Happy Box"	Maria Azevedo	3:33
12.	"Obsidian"	Daniel Vahnke	4:49
13.	"Patterns"	Athan Maroulis	2:54
14.	"Sandtrap"		2:12
15.	"Porker"	Daniel Vahnke	3:39
16.	"Core"	Athan Maroulis	3:10
17.	"Creeper"	Daniel Vahnke	2:42
18.	"Schlangenauge"		2:16
19.	"Albatross"	Daniel Vahnke	3:08
20.	"Fossilized"	Daniel Vahnke	2:12
21.	"A Perfect Lawn"		1:44
22.	"Goatweed"	Mark Edwards	2:56
23.	"H.M.P."		3:22
24.	"Evasion"	Dave Creadeau & Boom chr Paige	2:40

2019 Digital Re-Issue
No.	Title	Lyrics/Vocals	Length
1.	"Rain Wheel"	Maria Azevedo	3:09
2.	"Underneath"	Daniel Vahnke	3:16
3.	"Beta"	Jared Louche	4:50
4.	"Prophet Clown"	Daniel Vahnke	3:44
5.	"Chain"	Athan Maroulis	2:55
6.	"Gravity's Rim"	Daniel Vahnke	3:32
7.	"Calibrations"	Athan Maroulis	2:52
8.	"Ice Borers"	Daniel Vahnke	2:13
9.	"Code"	Jared Louche	2:10
10.	"Obsidian"	Daniel Vahnke	4:49
11.	"The Happy Box"	Maria Azevedo	3:33
12.	"Parameter Seven"	Daniel Vahnke	2:37
13.	"Patterns"	Athan Maroulis	2:54
14.	"Porker"	Daniel Vahnke	3:39
15.	"Sandtrap"		2:12
16.	"Core"	Athan Maroulis	3:10
17.	"Creeper"	Daniel Vahnke	2:42
18.	"Schlangenauge"		2:16
19.	"Fossilized"	Daniel Vahnke	2:12
20.	"Albatross"	Daniel Vahnke	3:08
21.	"A Perfect Lawn"		1:44
22.	"Goatweed"	Mark Edwards	2:56
23.	"Evasion"	Dave Creadeau & Boom chr Paige	2:40
24.	"H M P"		3:22
25.	"Smartass"	Dave Creadeau & Boom chr Paige	2:52
26.	"Chain" (Alternate Master)	Athan Maroulis	2:56
27.	"Piano Trio No. 2 in E-flat major, Op. 100, D. 929 (Variation on Schubert)" (Alternate Master)		2:28

== Personnel ==
Adapted from the Gravity's Rim liner notes.

Vampire Rodents

- Andrea Akastia – cello
- Daniel Vahnke (as Anton Rathausen) – sampler, guitar, bass guitar, lead vocals (2, 4, 6, 8, 10, 12, 15, 17, 19, 20)
- Victor Wulf – piano, synthesizer, organ

Additional musicians

- Maria Azevedo – lead vocals (5, 11)
- Chase – percussion, loops
- Dave Creadeau – lead vocals (24)
- Mark Edwards – lead vocals (22)
- Jared Louche – lead vocals (3, 9)
- Athan Maroulis – lead vocals (1, 7, 13, 16)
- Boom chr Paige – lead vocals (24)

Production

- Judson Leach – mastering, mixing

== Release history ==
Region	Date	Label	Format	Catalog
United States	1996	Fifth Colvmn	CD	9868-63224
