= Vampire Themes =

Compilation album by Various artists
- Released: 1997
- Genre: Electro; gothic rock; industrial
- Length: 72:56
- Label: Cleopatra

Vampire Themes is a various artists compilation album released in 1997 by Cleopatra Records. The album comprises songs from several industrial and gothic rock bands.

== Reception ==
Professional ratings
Review scores
| Source | Rating |
|---|---|
| AllMusic | 2.5/5 stars |

AllMusic gave Vampire Themes a rating of two and a half out of five possible stars.

== Track listing ==
| No. | Title | Writer(s) | Artist | Length |
|---|---|---|---|---|
| 1. | "Intro" | Christopher Lee | Christopher Lee | 2:05 |
| 2. | "Bela Lugosi's Dead" | Daniel Ash; David Haskins; Kevin Haskins; Peter Murphy | Bauhaus | 9:34 |
| 3. | "Sympathy for the Devil" (The Rolling Stones cover) | Jagger/Richards | The Electric Hellfire Club | 4:58 |
| 4. | "Graveyard Shift" | Damien DeVille; Dominic LaVey; Dante Savarelle | Nosferatu | 6:18 |
| 5. | "Vampire Hunter" | Wojciech Kilar | Leæther Strip | 4:52 |
| 6. | "Beach House" | Denny Jaeger; Michel Rubini | Fahrenheit 451 | 4:35 |
| 7. | "The Damned Testify" (Brimstone Mix) | Alan Lee Shaw; Christopher John Millar | The Damned | 2:35 |
| 8. | "Salem's Demise" | Romell Regulacion | Razed in Black | 4:14 |
| 9. | "Transylvania Twist" | Chuck Cirino | Ex-Vote | 4:46 |
| 10. | "Forever Knight" | Fred Mollin | Bell Book & Candle | 4:58 |
| 11. | "Dracula Rising" | Ed Tomney | Two Witches | 4:18 |
| 12. | "Schubert Trio in E-flat" (Franz Schubert cover) | Franz Schubert | Vampire Rodents | 2:25 |
| 13. | "Cat People (Putting Out Fire)" (David Bowie cover) | Giorgio Moroder; David Bowie | Big Electric Cat | 4:56 |
| 14. | "Daughters of Darkness" | Erik Christides | Bloodflag | 4:30 |

== Personnel ==
Adapted from the Vampire Themes liner notes.

- Carl Edwards – design
- Judson Leach – mastering

== Release history ==
| Region | Date | Label | Format | Catalog |
|---|---|---|---|---|
| United States | 1997 | Cleopatra | CD | CLP0003 |
