= Killing Floor (album) =

Studio album by Killing Floor
- Released: March 14, 1995
- Recorded: October 31, 1991 – 1995
- Studio: House of Faith (Palo Alto, CA)
- Genre: Electro-industrial
- Length: 53:30
- Label: Re-Constriction
- Producer: James Basore; John Belew; Christian Void; Marc Phillips; Karl Tellefsen

Killing Floor chronology
Killing Floor (1995)	Divide by Zero (1997)

Killing Floor (or /dev/null) is the eponymously titled debut studio album of Killing Floor, released on March 14, 1995, by Re-Constriction Records.

== Reception ==
Professional ratings
Review scores
Source	Rating
Allmusic	(unrated)

AllMusic gave Killing Floor a mixed review, crediting the quality of the Killing Floor's work even although noting that the band was adding nothing new to the industrial rock genre. Aiding & Abetting called it an effective debut for the band, saying "the production is superb, bringing the proper feel to each tune" and "nothing in the sound shrinks from exposure; all components are properly acknowledged." Fabryka Music Magazine gave the album four out of four called it the band's greatest merging of guitar driven industrial rock, electronic and coldwave music, saying "genius songs like "In Decline", "Two Dimes", "What Is the Truth?" and "Glass" should be put amongst the classic songs of industrial rock and coldwave styles." Sonic Boom commended the originality of the band and called the album one of the best dance mixed with guitar-based industrial rock albums they had reviewed.

== Track listing ==
All lyrics are written by Christian Void, except "In Decline" by Norman Spinrad; all music is composed by James Basore, John Belew, Christian Void, Marc Phillips, and Karl Tellefsen.

No.	Title	Length
1.	"Ecosystem" (Monkey House mix)	4:58
2.	"Strand"	2:50
3.	"Two Dimes"	5:06
4.	"Prelude"	1:52
5.	"Never Go Right"	5:00
6.	"Glass" (Shards re-edit)	4:36
7.	"What Is the Truth?"	5:26
8.	"In Decline"	12:06
9.	"Ecosystem" (Procreation Dub)	4:16
10.	"Glass (live) / Ace of Spades (Motörhead cover)"	7:21

== Personnel ==
Adapted from the Killing Fields liner notes.

Killing Floor

- James Basore – drums, drum programming, tape, production, engineering, mixing
- John Belew – sampler, electronics, programming, musical arrangement, production, engineering, mixing
- Christian Void (as Christian Void) – lead vocals, sampler, electronics, production, engineering, mixing
- Marc Phillips – electric guitar, bass guitar, backing vocals, production, engineering, mixing
- Karl Tellefsen – electric guitar, bass guitar, production, engineering, mixing

Production and additional personnel

- Bernt Bergdorf – engineering and mixing (5)
- Walter Dahn – cover art
- Keith Hillebrandt – editing
- Jimmy Lyons – recording, scratching (5)
- Mark Pistel – engineering and mixing (1)
- Josh T. Roberts – engineering, mixing
- Michael Romanowski – mastering
- Bart Thurber – recording, engineering and mixing (6, 9)

== Release history ==
Region	Date	Label	Format	Catalog
United States	1995	Re-Constriction	CD, LP	REC-013
