= Axon Tremolo =

Studio album by Axon Tremolo
- Released: July 20, 2018
- Recorded: 1996
- Genres: Ambient pop; sound collage
- Length: 74:47
- Label: Rodentia Productions

Daniel Vahnke chronology
| Music for Player Piano (2018) | Axon Tremolo (2018) | Early Soundtrack Sketches, Vol. I (2018) |

Axon Tremolo is the eponymously debut and only studio album by Axon Tremolo, released on July 20, 2018 by Rodentia Productions. Online magazine I Die: You Die stated, "a quick skim suggests some detours from the wholly sample-based methods on which Vahnke build his reputation for the sake of some smoother jams, or, in Vahnke's own words, "adult-contemporary new-age synth."

== Track listing ==
All lyrics are written by Daniel Vahnke, except "I Have Tried" by Lauren Kaplan; all music is composed by Daniel Vahnke.

| No. | Title | Length |
|---|---|---|
| 1. | "Talisman" | 2:50 |
| 2. | "Haven" | 3:48 |
| 3. | "Axis" | 3:42 |
| 4. | "Submerge" | 4:01 |
| 5. | "I Have Tried" | 2:39 |
| 6. | "Timeline" | 3:18 |
| 7. | "Free Again" | 4:53 |
| 8. | "Simplicity" | 4:59 |
| 9. | "Sky Wide Open" | 4:19 |
| 10. | "Cruising" | 3:59 |
| 11. | "Focus" | 5:37 |
| 12. | "The Light Below" | 4:11 |
| 13. | "Horizon" | 4:04 |
| 14. | "Sleepy Boat to Heaven" | 4:24 |
| 15. | "Silhouette" | 4:48 |
| 16. | "Axon Tremolo" | 13:15 |

== Personnel ==
Adapted from the Axon Tremolo liner notes.

Axon Tremolo

- Daniel Vahnke – sampler, vocals (2, 3, 7, 9, 11, 13, 14)

Additional performers

- Lauren Kaplan – vocals (5)

Production

- Neil Wojewodzki – mastering, editing

== Release history ==
| Region | Date | Label | Format |
|---|---|---|---|
| United States | 2018 | Rodentia Productions | DL |
