= Unfinished Business (Penal Colony album) =

Studio album by Penal Colony
- Released: May 23, 2003
- Genre: Electro-industrial
- Length: 75:57
- Label: DSBP
- Producer: Dee Madden

Penal Colony chronology
Multicoloured Shades (1995)	Unfinished Business (2003)

Unfinished Business is the second studio album by Penal Colony, released on May 12, 2003 by DSBP.

== Reception ==
Ryan Speck of Industrial Nation praised Unfinished Business for its hooks and said the album "takes those same Penal Colony punk undertones, strips them of their dark grime, and instead creates a paranoid electronic science fiction masterpiece, dragging you for 12 tracks (plus 2 remixes) through the gutters and alleyways of D Madden's brain."

== Track listing ==
All tracks are written by Dee Madden, except "Clones (We're All)" by David Carron

No.	Title	Length
1.	"Hypothalamus Now!"	6:01
2.	"Falling Down the Stairs"	4:30
3.	"Don't Let Them Forget to Tag Your Symptom"	4:45
4.	"Thee Unbearable Lightness Ov..."	5:06
5.	"Hazing (The Underlings With Your Broken Stickpin)"	4:40
6.	"Unfinished Business"	5:24
7.	"Scion"	3:38
8.	"In Between 5 and 14"	4:55
9.	"The Hand of John Kemble"	6:53
10.	"Host Meets the Cell"	4:19
11.	"21 Robot Man"	6:58
12.	"Clones (We're All)"	3:39
13.	"Falling Down The Stairs" (Scotch & Water Remix)	7:59
14.	"Unfinished Business" (Strike Down Remix)	7:08

== Personnel ==
Adapted from the Unfinished Business liner notes.

Penal Colony

- Dee Madden – lead vocals, instruments, production, design

Additional performers

- Joe Badger – backing vocals (10, 11)
- Grey Madden – guitar (11, 12)
- Chris Shinkus – bass guitar (8)

Production and design

- Connie Wetmore – cover art, illustrations

== Release history ==
Region	Date	Label	Format	Catalog
United States	2003	DSBP	CD	1056
