= 5 Man Job =

Remix album by Penal Colony
- Released: July 1995
- Genre: Electro-industrial
- Length: 68:41
- Label: Cleopatra
- Producers: Genesis P-Orridge; Larry Thrasher

Penal Colony chronology
Put Your Hands Down (1994)	5 Man Job (1995)	Multicoloured Shades (1995)

5 Man Job is a remix album by Penal Colony, released in July 1995 by Cleopatra Records. The album comprises remixed versions of tracks from Put Your Hands Down, with contributions from Frontline Assembly's Bill Leeb, Genesis P Orridge, Leather Strip, Spahn Ranch's Matt Green, and T.H.D.

== Reception ==
Aiding & Abetting commended 5 Man Job for its experimentation and variety. Sonic Boom claimed the material sounded too removed from Penal Colony's former sound, saying "I couldn't help but wonder where the band is among all the music" and "this may seem a bit harsh, but the remixes don't sound anything alike, even when it's the same track, the music totally originates from the band mixing the track."

== Track listing ==
All tracks are written by Jason Hubbard, Dee Madden, Andy Shaw and Chris Shinkus.

No.	Title	Remixer(s)	Length
1.	"Freemasons of Enochian Magick" (Jack the Crowley Remix)	Front Line Assembly	6:17
2.	"Third Life" (Time Center Remix)	Front Line Assembly	6:50
3.	"Umbilical" (Security 23rd World Remix)	Front Line Assembly	5:23
4.	"Blue 9" (Free Me Remee)	Front Line Assembly	5:43
5.	"Among the Living" (Transcendental Repression Remix)	Front Line Assembly	4:48
6.	"Halidified (Burnt RAM)" (Naked Men Only Remix)	Leæther Strip	3:49
7.	"Third Life" (Sweeping the Floor Remix)	Leæther Strip	4:23
8.	"Blue 9" (Sin Trip Remix)	Spahn Ranch	4:03
9.	"Freemasons of Enochian Magick" (Fallen Angels Remix)	Psychic TV	8:20
10.	"Extremist" (Parallel Qabal Remix)	Psychic TV	5:04
11.	"When the Veins... It's Time to Stop" (Fish Monkey Remix)	Psychic TV	7:22
12.	"Extremist" (Floor Power)	THD	6:39

== Personnel ==
Adapted from the 5 Man Job liner notes.

Penal Colony

- Jason Hubbard – sampler, programming, drum programming
- Dee Madden – lead vocals, sampler, programming, design
- Andy Shaw – electric guitar, backing vocals
- Chris Shinkus – bass guitar, backing vocals, design

Additional musicians

- Rhys Fulber – remixing and programming (1–5)
- Matt Green – remixing and programming (9)
- Michael Hateley – backing vocals (12)
- Claus Larsen – remixing and keyboards (7, 8)
- Bill Leeb – remixing and programming (1–5)
- Genesis P-Orridge – remixing and production (9–11)
- Shawn Rudiman – remixing (12)
- Larry Thrasher – remixing and production (9–11)
- Ed Vargo – remixing (12)

Production and additional personnel

- Judson Leach – mastering, remixing and programming (9)
- Brian Mars – design

== Release history ==
Region	Date	Label	Format	Catalog
United States	1995	Cleopatra	CD	CLEO 9512
