= Put Your Hands Down =

Studio album by Penal Colony
- Released: February 1994
- Genre: Electro-industrial
- Length: 46:46
- Label: Cleopatra
- Producer: Michael Hateley; Jason Hubbard; Dee Madden; Andy Shaw; Chris Shinkus

Penal Colony chronology
Put Your Hands Down (1994)	5 Man Job (1995)

Put Your Hands Down is the debut studio album of Penal Colony, released in February 1994 by Cleopatra Records.

== Reception ==
Factsheet Five compared the music of Put Your Hands Down favorably to Hate Dept. and described Penal Colony as being "masters of the genre." Industrialnation said "Penal Colony have already left several veteran bands in the dust" and "this music is for thos who like their music angst-ridden and dark, with a live feel."

== Track listing ==
All tracks are written by Jason Hubbard, Dee Madden, Andy Shaw and Chris Shinkus, except "Warsaw" by Ian Curtis, Peter Hook, Stephen Morris and Bernard Sumner

No.	Title	Length
1.	"Halidified (Burnt RAM)"	4:15
2.	"Product"	3:29
3.	"Blue 9"	3:15
4.	"Combine"	4:20
5.	"Drawn and Quartered"	4:05
6.	"Reconciled"	4:29
7.	"Organic"	4:02
8.	"Paste"	3:27
9.	"Gout"	2:48
10.	"Scoma"	3:34
11.	"Insemin"	3:09
12.	"Among the Living"	3:07
13.	"Warsaw" (Joy Division cover)	2:46

== Personnel ==
Adapted from the Put Your Hands Down liner notes.

Penal Colony

- Jason Hubbard – sampler, programming, drum programming, production, arrangements
- Dee Madden – lead vocals, sampler, programming, production, arrangements
- Andy Shaw – electric guitar, backing vocals, production, arrangements
- Chris Shinkus – bass guitar, backing vocals, production, arrangements

Additional musicians

- Tyler Anthony – harmonica (8)

Production and design

- John Bergin – cover art
- Brent Curtis – editing
- Michael Hateley – production, engineering
- Ken Jordan – engineering (7, 8, 12)
- Brian Mars – design
- Penal Colony – production, arrangements

== Release history ==
Region	Date	Label	Format	Catalog
United States	1994	Cleopatra	CD, CS	CLEO 1094
