= Dessau (band) =

American industrial rock band

- Origin: Nashville, Tennessee, United States
- Genre: Industrial rock
- Years active: 1983–2000
- Labels: Carlyle; Faction; Fifth Colvmn; Mausoleum
- Past members: John Elliott; Mike Orr; Barry Nelson; Skot Nelson; Norm Rau

Dessau were an American industrial rock band based out of Nashville, Tennessee. The band was founded by John Elliott, who worked with a revolving cast of musicians to create Dessau's music. The band released two studio albums, 1989's Exercise in Tension by Carlyle Records and 1995's Dessau by Mausoleum.

== History ==
Dessau was founded by composer John Elliott in 1983 out of Nashville. In 1985 he self-released Dessau's debut EP Red Languages. Happy Mood followed the next year and contained "First Year" from the band's debut. In 1988 the band released a 12" single of their cover of Joy Division's "Isolation", which was produced by Paul Barker of Revolting Cocks and Al Jourgensen of Ministry. The band released their debut studio album Exercise in Tension in 1989 by Carlyle Records. The EP Details Sketchy followed in 1995 and became Fifth Colvmn's fastest selling release.

In 1995 Dessau released an extended track remix of the song "Suffer" for the Fascist Communist Revolutionaries compilation and their self-titled second album for Mausoleum. The band covered Paul Dresser's "On the Banks of the Wabash, Far Away" and released it on Fifth Colmn's World War Underground compilation in 1996 and again on the 1998 Coolidge 50 compilation. In 1999 the band released a cover of "Revenge" by Ministry on Another Prick in the Wall - A Tribute to Ministry - Volume 2 by Invisible Records. The compilation The Truth Hurts 1985-2000, released in 2009, compiled several newly recorded tracks with live performances and track from the band's first two EPs. The collection was released on Bandcamp.

== Discography ==
Studio albums

- Exercise in Tension (1989, Carlyle)
- Dessau (1995, Mausoleum)

Extended plays

- Red Languages (1985)
- Happy Mood (1986, Faction)
- Details Sketchy (1995, Fifth Colvmn)

Singles

- Isolation (1988, Carlyle)
- Mad Hog (1988, Carlyle)
- Beijing/Europe Light (Remix) (1988, Carlyle)

Compilation albums

- The Truth Hurts 1985-2000 (2009, WTII)

Compilation appearances

- Music View - Radio's Alternative Talk Show #59 & #60 (1989, Joseph Fox Communications, Inc.)
- Nashville Rock (What You Haven't Heard...) (1993, Spock)
- C'Est La Silenz Qui Fait La Musique... (1994, Electro Pulse)
- Forced Cranial Removal (1995, Fifth Colvmn)
- Fascist Communist Revolutionaries (1996, Fifth Colvmn)
- CDPRO Vol #13 (June 1996) (1996, EMI Music Canada)
- Sound-Line Vol. 3 (1996, Side-Line)
- World War Underground (1997, Fifth Colvmn)
- Coolidge 50 (1998, Coolidge)
- Down & Dirty (1999, Pet Rock)
- Another Prick in the Wall - A Tribute to Ministry - Volume 2 (1999, Invisible)
- Tributaeminesteriumni - Two CD Tribute Set (2004, Underground, Inc.)
- Return to Elliston Square 1979-1989 (2008, Spat!)
- Resurrection 3 (2009, WTII)
- WTII Records 2014 Free Sampler (2014, Fifth Colvmn)
