= Momentous =

American dietary supplement company

- Type: Private
- Industry: Dietary supplements, sports nutrition
- Founded: 2018; 8 years ago
- Founders: Jeff Byers, Erica Good
- Headquarters: Park City, Utah, United States
- Key people: Jeff Byers (co-founder and CEO); Erica Good (co-founder and president)
- Products: Protein powders, creatine, omega-3 supplements, sleep and recovery supplements
- Revenue: c. US$104 million (2025)
- Number of employees: 55 (2025)
- Website: livemomentous.com

Momentous is an American dietary supplement company headquartered in Park City, Utah. In 2021, Momentous was acquired and merged with Amp Human, a Park City company.

== History ==
Momentous was originally founded in 2018 in Jackson Hole, Wyoming, by Matt Wan and media personality Rob Dyrdek. The company initially offered plant-based and whey protein products aimed at athletes. In November 2019, Momentous raised US$5 million in a Series A funding round led by venture capital firm FitLab.

In June 2021, Momentous and Amp Human, a Park City-based biotechnology company founded by Jeff Byers and Erica Good, announced a merger and acquisition, with the combined company continuing under the Momentous name. Prior to the merger and acquisition, Amp Human was known for PR Lotion, a topical product containing sodium bicarbonate marketed to athletes for supporting muscle performance and recovery. It was used by professional athletes, including competitors in the NFL, NHL and NBA, Olympic athletes, and endurance cyclists.

Following the acquisition, the combined entity continued under the Momentous brand, with its headquarters relocating to Park City, Utah^{[11]}. Wan took the post of chief product officer, and Byers became chief executive officer and Erica Good became president. Investors in the merged company included climber Alex Honnold, photographer Jimmy Chin, cyclist Geraint Thomas and NFL player Ndamukong Suh.

In February 2024, New York-based investment firm Humble Growth, co-founded by RXBAR founder Peter Rahal, Orgain founder and CEO Dr. Andrew Abraham, and Nick Giannuzzi, acquired a minority stake in Momentous for US$32 million. Most of the investment was used to purchase shares from earlier investors, including the corporate venture arm of DSM-Firmenich. At the time of the transaction, the company had approximately US$40 million in sales for 2023.

Momentous has appeared on the Inc. 5000 list of fast-growing private companies at No. 981 in 2023, No. 345 in 2024, No. 392 in 2025 and No. 426 in 2026.

In June 2024, Momentous discontinued a fadogia supplement that had been introduced in 2022 after its head of science raised concerns about the ingredient's efficacy.

== Products ==
Momentous sells protein powders, creatine, omega-3 supplements, and products marketed for sleep, cognitive health and recovery. By 2025, its product range had expanded from five products to more than 50. In 2025, the company introduced a range of products for women developed with physiologist Stacy Sims. In June 2026, it introduced a reformulated creatine product that was screened for PFAS and microplastics.

In 2025, approximately 60% of Momentous sales were made through its website, 30% through Amazon, and 10% through institutional and other channels. That year, its products were introduced at retailers including Scheels and Harmons. Its first nationwide retail launch was with The Vitamin Shoppe, where its products were stocked at more than 640 locations. In October 2026, the company expanded its nationwide retail partnership with Target to all of the chain’s locations, after an initial launch in 600 stores.

Momentous established a Scientific Advisory Board that includes neuroscientist Andrew Huberman, exercise physiologist Stacy Sims, professor Andy Galpin and physical therapist Kelly Starrett. Momentous uses an internal quality control protocol known as the Momentous Standard, which includes third-party testing, ingredient assessments, and label verification. Most of its products carry NSF Certified for Sport certification. Momentous uses an internal quality control protocol which includes third-party testing, ingredient assessments and label verification.

In 2026, it introduced the Signature Spec designation for creatine products manufactured under pharmaceutical-grade production standards.

The company supplies dietary supplements to more than 200 professional and collegiate sports programs.

=== Products for women ===
In 2025, Momentous partnered with exercise physiologist Stacy Sims to launch a range of products for women's athletic performance and health. The company also introduced Change The Ratio, an initiative that committed an initial $500,000 to research on women's health and performance.

== Partnerships ==
In May 2023, Momentous signed a three-year agreement to become the official supplement and sports nutrition partner of CrossFit and the CrossFit Games. In July 2025, it signed a multi-year agreement as the official supplement partner of the men's and women's national teams of USA Rugby. In August 2026, the company announced a partnership with the New York Liberty. In addition to its business in professional and collegiate sports, Momentous has completed 11 research and development contracts with the United States Department of Defense for military human performance applications.

In 2022, Momentous entered into a multi-year sponsorship and product development agreement with the Huberman Lab podcast hosted by neuroscientist Andrew Huberman, co-formulating branded supplement protocols.

The company also maintains media and affiliate partnerships across health and fitness platforms, including collaborations with The Ready State co-founder Kelly Starrett, podcast hosts Tim Ferriss and Rich Roll, and announced a multi-year brand partnership with Arnold Schwarzenegger in January 2026.
