= Red Languages =

EP by Dessau
- Released: October 1, 1985
- Genre: Industrial rock
- Producer: Martin Hannett

Dessau chronology
Red Languages (1985)	Happy Mood (1986)

Red Languages is the debut EP of Dessau, self-released on October 1, 1985.

== Track listing ==
All tracks are written by John Elliott] and Kim Ervin Elliott.

Side one
No.	Title	Length
1.	"Red Languages"

Side two
No.	Title	Length
1.	"First Year"
2.	"Crutch of Utility"

== Personnel ==
Adapted from the Red Languages liner notes.

Dessau

- John Elliott – instruments and vocals (A)

Additional performers

- Patrick Benson – drums (B1)
- Kim Ervin Elliott – voice (A)
- Kevin Hamilton – guitar (B1, B2)
- James Horn – bass guitar (B1, B2)
- Skot Nelson – guitar (A)
- Mike Orr – bass guitar (A)

Production and design

- Tom Der – assistant producer
- Martin Hannett – production
- Michel Kestemont – engineering
- Bobby Stewart – engineering
- Mark Wood – executive-producer

== Release history ==
Region	Date	Label
United States	1985	LP
