= Exercise in Tension =

Studio album by Dessau
- Released: 1989
- Recorded: 1988 – 1989
- Studio: Sound Emporium (Nashville, Tennessee); Treasure Isle (Chicago, Illinois)
- Genre: Industrial rock
- Length: 31:06
- Label: Carlyle
- Producer: Paul Barker; John Elliott; Al Jourgensen; Giles Reaves

Dessau chronology
Happy Mood (1986)	Exercise in Tension (1989)	Details Sketchy (1995)

Singles from LetDownCrush
- 1. "Isolation" Released: 1988; 2. "Beijing"/"Europe Light" Released: 1990

Exercise in Tension is the debut studio album of Dessau, released in 1989 by Carlyle Records.

== Music ==
The track "Europe Light" was originally released on the Happy Mood EP and was then provided to the 1989 Music View – Radio's Alternative Talk Show No. 59 & #60 compilation by Joseph Fox Communications, Inc. The song was also remixed and released as additional material on the compact disc version and the following year as a single with "Beijing" on August 3, 1990. The band's cover of Joy Division's "Isolation" was recorded in 1988 and produced by Paul Barker of Revolting Cocks and Al Jourgensen of Ministry. The cover has been released as a 12" single and on three various artists compilations: C'Est La Silenz Qui Fait La Musique... (1994, Electro Pulse), CDPRO Vol #13 (June 1996) (1996, EMI Music Canada) and Down & Dirty (1999, Pet Rock). "Isolation" and the track "Beijing", from the CD edition of the album, became a minor hits for the band.

== Reception ==
Professional ratings
Review scores
Source	Rating
Allmusic	3/5 stars

AllMusic awarded Exercise in Tension a rating of three out of five stars.

== Track listing ==
All tracks are written by John Elliott, Barry Nelson and Mike Orr, except "Isolation" by Ian Curtis, Bernard Sumner, Peter Hook and Stephen Morris.

Side one
No.	Title	Length
1.	"Never Change"	4:52
2.	"No Way"	3:32
3.	"Move Seoul"	3:21
4.	"Principal Tension"	3:18

Side two
No.	Title	Length
1.	"More Than Mad"	3:55
2.	"Europe Light"	3:24
3.	"Shovel"	3:41
4.	"Isolation" (Joy Division cover)	5:03

Bonus tracks
No.	Title	Length
9.	"Crowfest"	5:57
10.	"Imperial Hotel" (Remix)	6:08
11.	"Beijing (Dessau song)"	5:52
12.	"Europe Light" (Remix)	6:54

== Personnel ==
Adapted from the Exercise in Tension liner notes.

Dessau

- John Elliott – instruments, vocals, production, mixing, cover art
- Barry Nelson – bass guitar, mixing, cover art
- Mike Orr – guitar, vocals, mixing, cover art

Production and design

- Paul Barker – production (B4)
- Bill Brunt – cover art
- Brian Hardin – editing ("Beijing")
- Al Jourgensen – production (B4)
- Mike Poole – engineering
- Giles Reaves – production, engineering, mixing
- Todd Sholar – engineering
- Steve Spapperi – engineering (B4)
- Preston Sullivan – executive-producer
- Rick Will – mixing and editing ("Beijing")

== Release history ==
Region	Date	Label	Format	Catalog
United States	1989	Carlyle	CD, CS, LP	CR-6689
Netherlands	1989	Carlyle	CD, CS	CAR-269516
Germany	1989	Carlyle	CD, LP	CAR-269516
