= Details Sketchy =

EP by Dessau
- Released: September 19, 1995
- Studio: Various: Sound Vortex; (Nashville, Tennessee); Warzone Recorders; (Chicago, Illinois)
- Genre: Industrial rock
- Length: 46:31
- Label: Fifth Colvmn
- Producer: Van Christie; John Elliott; Jason McNinch

Dessau chronology
Exercise in Tension (1989)	Details Sketchy (1995)	Dessau (1995)

Details Sketchy is an EP by Dessau, released on September 19, 1995, by Fifth Colvmn Records. The album was Fifth Colvmn' fastest seller despite composer John Elliott being underwhelmed by the finished recordings.

== Music ==
The EP Details Sketchy revealed the band adopting more of a heavy metal-style in comparison to their dance oriented back catalogue. The track "The Sun" appeared on two various artists compilations, 1995's Forced Cranial Removal by Fifth Colvmn Records and 2009's Resurrection 3 by WTII Records.

== Reception ==
Fabryka Music Magazine gave Details Sketchy two out of four stars and said "there are several rock songs in the cloud of samples ad loops but such a fusion doesn't impress because either of the ideas or the dynamics." Black Monday called the EP "nothing memorable" and noted that its "being "pushed" on the laurels of guest performances by members of Ministry, Revolting Cocks, Nine In Nails, Filter and Die Warzau. Sonic Boom said "the music itself is kind of a light-hearted dance festival with catchy lyrics with the occasional guitar chord thrown in for good measure" and compared it favorably to Filter's or Revolting Cocks' lighter material.

== Track listing ==
No.	Title	Writer(s)	Length
1.	"Sun"	Paul Barker; John Elliott	6:03
2.	"(Un)shakeable"	Elliott	5:26
3.	"Muscle"	Barker; Elliott	4:06
4.	"Chalkline"	Van Christie; Elliott; Jason McNinch; Matt Warren	6:11
5.	"Sunburn"	Barker; Elliott	4:32
6.	"History"	Christie; Elliott; McNinch; Warren	4:12
7.	"Chalk Rub"	Elliott	6:13
99.	"Old Dudes Rest"	Matt Swanson	0:59

Notes
- Tracks 8–98 consist of several seconds of silence each

== Personnel ==
Adapted from the Details Sketchy liner notes.

Dessau

- John Elliott – programming, keyboards, additional drums, production, recording, engineering, mixing
- Norm Rau – vocals, guitar, percussion

Additional performers

- Luc van Acker – additional guitar
- Paul Barker – additional guitar, additional bass guitar
- Frank Brodlo – additional bass guitar
- Ken Coomer – additional drums
- Van Christie – additional programming, additional synthesizer, production
- Bill Jackson – additional guitar
- Jim Marcus – additional programming
- Jason McNinch – additional programming, additional synthesizer, additional guitar, production, recording, engineering, mixing, editing
- Skot Nelson – additional guitar
- Richard Patrick – additional guitar
- Don Wallace – additional bass guitar
- Matt Warren – additional programming
- Mars Williams – additional saxophone

Production and design

- Robb Earls – recording, engineering, mixing
- Zalman Fishman – executive-producer
- Dylan Thomas More – art direction, design
- Jay O'Rourke – mastering
- Wayne Stearns – photography

== Release history ==
Region	Date	Label	Format	Catalog
United States	1995	Fifth Colvmn	CD	9868-63199
