= Multicoloured Shades =

Remix album by Penal Colony
- Released: February 13, 1995
- Genre: Electro-industrial
- Length: 67:43
- Label: Zoth Ommog

Penal Colony chronology
5 Man Job (1995)	Multicoloured Shades (1995)	Shadows in Blue (1995)

Multicoloured Shades is a remix album by Penal Colony, released on February 13, 1995 by Zoth Ommog Records.

== Reception ==
Professional ratings
Review scores
Source	Rating
Allmusic	2/5 stars

AllMusic awarded Multicoloured Shades two out of five possible stars.

== Track listing ==
All tracks are written by Jason Hubbard, Dee Madden, Andy Shaw and Chris Shinkus

No.	Title	Remixer(s)	Length
1.	"Halidified (Burnt RAM)" (Naked Men Only Mix)	Leæther Strip	3:51
2.	"Freemasons of Enochian Magick" (Jack the Crowley Mix)	Front Line Assembly	6:18
3.	"Third Life" (Time Center Mix)	Front Line Assembly	6:49
4.	"Umbilical" (Security 23rd World Mix)	Front Line Assembly	5:25
5.	"Blue 9" (Free Me Mix)	Spahn Ranch	4:04
6.	"Extremist"		6:04
7.	"Third Life"		4:41
8.	"Freemasons of Enochian Magick"		3:41
9.	"Among the Living" (Transcendental Repression Mix)	Front Line Assembly	4:49
10.	"Extremist" (Floor Power)	THD	6:36
11.	"Freemasons of Enochian Magick" (Fallen Angels Mix)	Psychic TV	8:23
12.	"Reconciled" (No Remorse Mix)	Dee Madden	7:02

== Personnel ==
Adapted from the Multicoloured Shades liner notes.

Penal Colony

- Jason Hubbard – sampler, programming, drum programming
- Dee Madden – lead vocals, sampler, programming, design, remixing (12)
- Andy Shaw – electric guitar, backing vocals
- Chris Shinkus – bass guitar, backing vocals, design

Additional musicians

- Rhys Fulber – remixing (2–4, 9)
- Matt Green – remixing (5)
- Bill Leeb – remixing (2–4, 9)
- Claus Larsen – remixing (1)
- Genesis P-Orridge – remixing (11)
- Shawn Rudiman – remixing (10)
- Larry Thrasher – remixing (11)
- Ed Vargo – remixing (10)

== Release history ==
Region	Date	Label	Format	Catalog
United States	1995	Zoth Ommog	CD	ZOT 132
