= Early Soundtrack Sketches, Vol. I =

Studio album by Daniel Vahnke
- Released: August 1, 2018
- Recorded: 1985 – 1987
- Genre: Modern classical; electronic
- Length: 47:41
- Label: Rodentia Productions

Daniel Vahnke chronology
Gravity's Rim (Instrumental Version) (2018)	Early Soundtrack Sketches, Vol. I (2018)	Early Soundtrack Sketches, Vol. II (2018)

Early Soundtrack Sketches, Vol. I is the second studio album of Daniel Vahnke, released on August 1, 2018 by Rodentia Productions.

== Track listing ==
All music is composed by Daniel Vahnke

No.	Title	Length
1.	"Calling"	0:28
2.	"Blue Vessel"	2:48
3.	"Green Eyes"	3:15
4.	"The Anthill"	2:44
5.	"Vapor"	2:19
6.	"Two Discovery Sketches"	2:12
7.	"Yellow Fields"	2:01
8.	"Atmosphere Pulse #4"	0:50
9.	"Territory"	2:32
10.	"Amo"	3:01
11.	"Ascension"	1:54
12.	"String Improvisation #12"	2:39
13.	"Asleep III"	1:02
14.	"Asleep II"	2:38
15.	"Asleep I"	2:25
16.	"Dismantled"	2:14
17.	"A Step Back"	1:09
18.	"Gentle Reminder"	2:39
19.	"Future Test"	1:40
20.	"Rat Nest"	2:59
21.	"Sexrite 1.0"	4:12

== Personnel ==
Adapted from the Early Soundtrack Sketches, Vol. I liner notes.

Axon Tremolo

- Daniel Vahnke – sampler, piano

Production

- Neil Wojewodzki – mastering, editing

== Release history ==
Region	Date	Label	Format
United States	2018	Rodentia Productions	DL
