= Music for Player Piano =

Studio album by Daniel Vahnke
- Released: June 30, 2018
- Recorded: 1988 – 1991
- Genre: Modern classical
- Length: 36:59
- Label: Rodentia Productions

Daniel Vahnke chronology
Attention Please (2017)	Music for Player Piano (2018)	Gravity's Rim (Instrumental Version) (2018)

Music for Player Piano is the debut studio album by Daniel Vahnke, released on June 30, 2018, by Rodentia Productions.

== Track listing ==
All music is composed by Daniel Vahnke

No.	Title	Length
1.	"Imhotep"	1:57
2.	"The Twelve Dead Tones"	0:41
3.	"Three Fragments"	1:22
4.	"Two Feathers"	0:57
5.	"Piano Suite No. 1"	4:10
6.	"Burlesque"	0:53
7.	"Phrases"	3:23
8.	"Zhongxie"	2:26
9.	"Decomposition"	3:35
10.	"Friction"	0:58
11.	"Rodentia Ostinati I"	0:56
12.	"Rodentia Ostinati II"	1:11
13.	"Rodentia Ostinati III"	1:03
14.	"Rodentia Ostinati IV"	1:06
15.	"Piano Improvisation No. 3"	0:25
16.	"Piano Improvisation No. 4"	2:09
17.	"Piano Improvisation No. 5"	1:23
18.	"Piano Improvisation No. 2"	1:28
19.	"Piano Improvisation No. 1"	2:38
20.	"Rodentia Ostinati I-IV"	4:18

== Personnel ==
Adapted from the Music for Player Piano liner notes.

Axon Tremolo

- Daniel Vahnke – piano

Production

- Neil Wojewodzki – mastering, editing

== Release history ==
Region	Date	Label	Format
United States	2018	Rodentia Productions	DL
