= Happy Mood =

EP by Dessau
- Released: 1986
- Studios: Belmont Studio (Nashville, Tennessee)
- Genre: Industrial rock
- Length: 14:46
- Label: Faction
- Producers: Tom Der; Robb Earls; Michel Kestemont

Dessau chronology
Red Languages (1985)	Happy Mood (1986)	Exercise in Tension (1989)

Happy Mood is the second EP by Dessau, released in 1986 by Faction Records.

== Music ==
The tracks "Europe Light" and "Imperial Hotel" were released on the 1989 compilations Music View – Radio's Alternative Talk Show No. 59 & #60 by Joseph Fox Communications, Inc. and Nashville Rock (What You Haven't Heard...) by Joseph Fox Communications, Inc. The songs "First Year" was originally released on the band's Red Languages EP.

== Track listing ==
Side one
No.	Title	Writer(s)	Length
1.	"Europe Light"	John Elliott	3:27
2.	"Imperial Hotel"	Elliott	4:42

Side two
No.	Title	Writer(s)	Length
1.	"Unshakeable"	Elliott	3:06
2.	"First Year"	Elliott; Kim Ervin Elliott	3:31

== Personnel ==
Adapted from the Happy Mood liner notes.

Dessau

- John Elliott – instruments, vocals, cover art, illustrations, design

Additional performers

- Frank Brodlo – bass guitar (B1)
- Tom Gregory – percussion and production (A2)
- Kim Ervin Elliott – vocals (B2)
- Tommy Lee Harding – percussion and production (A2)
- James Horn – bass guitar (B2)
- Skot Nelson – guitar (A2, B1)
- Mike Orr – bass guitar (A2)
- Andy Schmidt – guitar (A1)

Production and design

- Tom Der – production (B1, B2), engineering (B1)
- Robb Earls – production and engineering (A1)
- Michel Kestemont – production and engineering (B2)
- Mark Wood – executive-producer

== Release history ==
Region	Date	Label	Format	Catalog
United States	1986	Faction	LP	05
