= Attention Please (Ether Bunny album) =

Studio album by Ether Bunny
- Released: December 28, 2017
- Recorded: 1996
- Genre: Electronic; experimental big band; sound collage
- Length: 57:06
- Label: Rodentia Productions

Ether Bunny chronology
Papa Woody (1996)	Attention Please (2017)

Daniel Vahnke chronology
Noises in the Wall (2017)	Attention Please (2017)	Music for Player Piano (2018)

Attention Please is the second studio album by American experimental big band project Ether Bunny, released on December 28, 2017 by Rodentia Productions. Its working title was Toybox.

== Track listing ==
All music is composed by Daniel Vahnke.

No.	Title	Length
1.	"Feet First"	3:39
2.	"Tweetledweeb"	2:28
3.	"Laptop Carpetbagger"	1:54
4.	"Distance"	4:03
5.	"Beaver Etiquette"	2:16
6.	"Nautilus"	1:45
7.	"Tuberosity"	1:28
8.	"Glass Umbrella"	3:05
9.	"Amphorae"	3:32
10.	"Crumpet"	2:06
11.	"Open Window"	3:47
12.	"Toybox"	2:10
13.	"Skullcap"	2:49
14.	"Candybowl"	1:25
15.	"Grapeshot"	2:03
16.	"Pocket Troll"	1:46
17.	"Lipper Twist"	1:11
18.	"Torquelick"	2:09
19.	"Attention Please"	2:22
20.	"Clone Alone"	1:41
21.	"Rasputum"	0:55
22.	"Cassiopeia"	4:20
23.	"Henry Catwallace"	4:11

== Personnel ==
Adapted from the Music for Player Piano liner notes.

Ether Bunny

- Daniel Vahnke – sampler, musical arrangements

Production

- Neil Wojewodzki – mastering, mixing, editing

== Release history ==
Region	Date	Label	Format
United States	2017	Rodentia Productions	DL
