= Early Soundtrack Sketches, Vol. II =

Studio album by Daniel Vahnke
- Released: August 1, 2018
- Recorded: 1985 – 1987
- Genre: Modern classical; electronic
- Length: 37:56
- Label: Rodentia Productions

Daniel Vahnke chronology
Early Soundtrack Sketches, Vol. I (2018)	Early Soundtrack Sketches, Vol. II (2018)	Cut to the Chase (2019)

Early Soundtrack Sketches, Vol. II is the third studio album by Daniel Vahnke, released on August 1, 2018, by Rodentia Productions.

== Track listing ==
All music is composed by Daniel Vahnke

No.	Title	Length
1.	"Checkers"	0:56
2.	"Amo II"	1:25
3.	"TV Theme"	1:07
4.	"Down to Business"	2:01
5.	"Children's Song"	0:48
6.	"Background #6"	0:33
7.	"They Go Up"	2:08
8.	"South of North"	1:45
9.	"Crossfade"	6:20
10.	"Calling, Scene 2"	1:40
11.	"Calling, Scene 3"	2:31
12.	"Pulse #10"	1:20
13.	"Pulse #11"	1:18
14.	"Pulse #12"	1:18
15.	"Piano Sketch #13"	1:12
16.	"Piano Room #12"	1:05
17.	"Piano Room #11"	0:48
18.	"Piano Room #10"	0:52
19.	"Landscape #11"	1:08
20.	"Landscape #17"	0:40
21.	"Landscape #37"	1:10
22.	"Scene Improvisation #10"	1:15
23.	"Scene Improvisation #9"	1:10
24.	"Scene Improvisation #8"	0:32
25.	"Scene Improvisation #7"	1:38
26.	"Rat Nest I & IV"	1:16

== Personnel ==
Adapted from the Early Soundtrack Sketches, Vol. II liner notes.

Axon Tremolo

- Daniel Vahnke – synthesizers, piano (15-18), sampler (4, 26)

Production

- Neil Wojewodzki – mastering, editing

== Release history ==
Region	Date	Label	Format
United States	2018	Rodentia Productions	DL
