= War Music (Vampire Rodents album) =

1991 Vampire Rodents album

Studio album by Vampire Rodents
- Released: August 20, 1990
- Recorded: 1989 – January 1990
- Genres: Industrial, experimental rock
- Length: 56:57
- Labels: V.R. Dossier (re-issue)
- Producer: Vampire Rodents

Vampire Rodents chronology
War Music (1990)	Premonition (1992)

War Music is the debut studio album of Vampire Rodents, released on August 20, 1990, by V.R. Productions. It introduced the sound of the band, and several of the techniques they would use in their later works, such as sound clips and songs in different languages. Daniel has described War Music as being "a little primitive, but very funny".

== Music and lyrics ==
A simpler musical foundation consisting of drums, bass guitar and electric guitar was utilized to trick listeners into believing the duo were an industrial rock group. Similar to other industrial music of the time, sampled movie and television dialogue was peppered throughout the compositions. This prompted some to draw comparisons between the Rodents and other prominent musical acts such as Skinny Puppy and Einstürzende Neubauten. The compositions also borrow snippets of sound from previously recorded and released music, such as "Momentous" from older funk tunes.

The album probably gained the most recognition for Vahnke's lyrics, which utilize dark humor to explore environmentalist and anti-human themes. Although primary an English language album, lyrics for two tracks were translated into another language: "Dumme Weisse Menschen", whose lyrics were written in German, and "PLA Man", which was written in Chinese. "Dumme Weisse Menschen", which opened the album, even caused some listeners to assume that the band comprised German musicians. The song, which translates to "stupid white people", was described by Victor Wulf as a critiquing of Western culture and an archetype of the band's philosophy. Vahnke described the Chinese language song "Pla Man" as a polemic against the Beijing government and for its involvement in the Tiananmen Square Massacre of 1989. The track Abortion Clinic Deli was inspired by the famous satirical piece, A Modest Proposal.

== Release and reception ==
The record was completed in January 1990 and released on cassette for a limited run of 918 pressings under the label V.R. Productions. The album was then adopted by Dossier in 1991 and re-released on CD for a wider distribution. When War Music was re-issued, the song "Meat" was moved from being the album's opener to its closer. The album is currently out of print on both labels. There were plans to re-issue the album with Premonition and an expanded track listing, including the unreleased songs "Lizardman", "Blind Acceleration", "Smartass", "Harelip", and "Annexation II".

Robert Baird of the Phoenix New Times was somewhat enthusiastic about the album, saying that although "the band's darkly humorous, apocalyptic visions are set to a cyber-aggressive post-industrialist beat" that there is "a point to all the sickness and gore."

== Track listing ==
All lyrics are written by Daniel Vahnke, except "Abortion Clinic Deli" by Victor Wulf; all music is composed by Daniel Vahnke, except "Momentous", "Press of Flesh", "Success" and "Abortion Clinic Deli" by Victor Wulf.

Side one
No.	Title	Length
1.	"Meat"	3:42
2.	"Dumme Weisse Menschen"	4:08
3.	"Fragrance of Christ"	2:20
4.	"Extinction"	4:22
5.	"The Ninth Floor"	1:53
6.	"Mummified"	3:47
7.	"The Tide Returns"	3:10
8.	"PLA Man"	3:52

Side two
No.	Title	Length
1.	"Autocannibalism"	4:40
2.	"Crack Babies"	2:18
3.	"Momentous"	3:19
4.	"Press of Flesh"	3:14
5.	"Holiday"	4:30
6.	"Friktion"	1:01
7.	"Success"	4:00
8.	"Abortion Clinic Deli"	2:15
9.	"Sexrite"	4:26

CD track listing
No.	Title	Length
1.	"Dumme Weisse Menschen"	4:08
2.	"Fragrance of Christ"	2:20
3.	"Extinction"	4:22
4.	"The Ninth Floor"	1:53
5.	"Mummified"	3:47
6.	"The Tide Returns"	3:10
7.	"Pla Man"	3:52
8.	"Autocannibalism"	4:40
9.	"Crack Babies"	2:18
10.	"Momentous"	3:19
11.	"Press of Flesh"	3:14
12.	"Holiday"	4:30
13.	"Friktion"	1:01
14.	"Success"	4:00
15.	"Abortion Clinic Deli"	2:15
16.	"Sexrite"	4:26
17.	"Meat"	3:42

2019 Digital Re-Issue
No.	Title	Length
1.	"Meat"	3:42
2.	"Extinction"	4:22
3.	"Fragrance of Christ"	2:20
4.	"The Ninth Floor"	1:53
5.	"Mummified"	3:47
6.	"The Tide Returns"	3:10
7.	"Autocannibalism"	4:40
8.	"Pla Man"	3:52
9.	"Crack Babies"	2:18
10.	"Momentous"	3:19
11.	"Press of Flesh"	3:14
12.	"Holiday"	4:30
13.	"Friktion"	1:01
14.	"Dumme Weisse Menschen"	4:08
15.	"Success"	4:00
16.	"Sexrite"	4:26
17.	"Abortion Clinic Deli"	2:15

== Personnel ==
Adapted from the War Music liner notes.

Vampire Rodents

- Daniel Vahnke (as Anton Rathausen) – lead vocals, guitar, sampler
- Victor Wulf – keyboards, lead vocals (17)

Additional musicians

- Karl Geist – bass guitar, keyboards
- Jing Laoshu – percussion

== Release history ==
Region	Date	Label	Format	Catalog
United States	1990	V.R. Productions	CS	VR1
Germany	1991	Dossier	CD	DCD 9025
