= Penal Colony (band) =

American rock band

- Origin: Inland Empire, California, US
- Genres: Electro-industrial
- Years active: 1992–2003
- Labels: Cleopatra, Zoth Ommog
- Past members: Jason Hubbard; Dee Madden; Andy Shaw; Chris Shinkus; Justin Bennett; William Skye; Paris Sadonis
- Website: thepenalcolony.com

Penal Colony were an electro-industrial outfit based in the Inland Empire section of Southern California, and fronted by Dee Madden. The original incarnation consisted of Madden, Jason Hubbard, Andy Shaw and Chris Shinkus.

The touring lineup of the band featured Paris Sadonis of Premature Ejaculation, Shadow Project, EXP and Involution, William Skye of London After Midnight, and Justin Bennett of Skinny Puppy, My Life with the Thrill Kill Kult, Nivek Ogre, Pigface and Bahntier.

== History ==
Penal Colony were formed in the summer of 1992 by Dee Madden, Jason Hubbard, Andy Shaw and Chris Shinkus. Guitarist Andy Shaw, Bassist Chris Shinkus, and Drummer Jason Hubbard had been members of the goth/glam rock outfit The Texas Vamps. Vocalist Dee Madden had been involved in the gothic rock band Ex-VoTo but parted ways with them after the rest of the band relocated to New Orleans. The band made their live performance debut on October 31, 1992.

In 1993, the band were discovered by Cleopatra Records during a show at The Roxy in Hollywood and were signed to the label. They issued their full-length debut, titled Put Your Hands Down, in 1994. A remix album followed in 1995 and was titled 5 Man Job. The album comprises remixed versions of previously released work, with collaborations by Frontline Assembly's Bill Leeb, Genesis P Orridge, Leather Strip, Spahn Ranch's Matt Green, and T.H.D. Aiding & Abetting described the album as having "a nice schizophrenic appeal" and as "a fine second by folks who refuse to take the easy road." Hubbard, Shaw and Shinkus all departed from Penal Colony immediately after the album's release and before its supporting national tour, effectively making the band Madden's solo project.

The remix compilations Multicoloured Shades and Shadows in Blue were released in 1995 by Zoth Ommog Records. Activity halted in 1998 when Madden moved to Northwest to re-form his old band Simstim. Nine years after their debut, Penal Colony's follow-up studio album Unfinished Business was released on May 23, 2003 by DSBP Records.

== Discography ==
Studio albums

- Put Your Hands Down (Cleopatra, 1994)
- Unfinished Business (DSBP, 2003)

Remix albums

- 5 Man Job (Cleopatra, 1994)
- Multicoloured Shades (Zoth Ommog, 1995)
- Shadows in Blue (Zoth Ommog, 1995)
