= Giles Reaves =

Multi-instrumentalist, audio engineer

Giles Reaves is a multi-instrumentalist sound artist and audio engineer who has composed albums of space music. His most recognized album, Sea of Glass, 1992, peaked at #11 on the Billboard Top New Age Albums chart.

== Biography ==
Reaves got his start in the Nashville country music business in the 1980s, as an engineer working for producer Marshall Montgomery. MCA producer Tony Brown overheard Reaves' space music improvisations in a studio late one night, and signed him for a contract that resulted in two solo albums and a collaboration with Jon Goin on the MCA Master Series. MCA provided little promotion or distribution for these albums, but 1986's Wunjo received critical acclaim from Electronic Musician magazine, which named it a top electronic album of all time.

Wunjo first appeared on the U.S. public radio show Hearts of Space (HoS) in PGM 113: Scorpio, 1986. Pieces from Reaves's albums have appeared in 17 HoS programs broadcast during the show's 25-year history. In February 2000, HoS broadcast a retrospective program dedicated to Wunjo since it was long out of print at that point. (PGM 551: Wunjo Revisited)

In 1992, HoS producer Stephen Hill contacted Reaves to tell him about fans of HoS who still wrote to him wanting copies of Wunjo, which were unavailable because of MCA's original limited distribution. With the expiration of the MCA contract, Reaves had another album of unpublished music that interested Hill. Reaves signed with Hill's Hearts of Space Records for the release of Sea of Glass, which remained on the new age charts for four months. Music journalist Bert Strolenberg wrote about Sea of Glass in 2007, "This classic space music recording by Nashville-based synthesist Giles Reaves is one of those milestones that can stand the test of time for decades, as it still sounds fresh and inspiring after all these years."

Later in the 1990s, Reaves joined the improvisational space music group Spacecraft, described by Star's End radio as "one of the leading voices in the spacemusic community". Reaves also appeared on Tony Gerber's Blue Western Sky on the Lektronic Soundscapes label.

In 2001, Kaleida Visions was released by the Space for Music team. SFM included Reaves as an original member along with Kirby Shelstad, with whom he also collaborated in live performances and on recordings.

In 2002, with Spacecraft and also as a solo artist, he performed at the Nashville Space for Music Festival, along with other noted Nashville artists including Aashid Himons & Future Man from Bela Fleck & the Flecktones, Robert Rich, the West Tennessee ensemble Zero Ohms, and others. The space music festival had been founded by fellow Spacecraft band-member Tony Gerber in 1986.

Reaves also creates 3D renderings that have been used for CD cover artwork.

Beyond space music, Reaves has another career as an engineer and co-producer for the Nashville rock music scene, including work with Dessau (band) and Grinning Plowmen. He also collaborated with Afrikan Dreamland, Bedlam, Lisa Germano, Jaime Kyle, Tom Littlefield, Bill Lloyd, and Lounge Flounders.

In 2011, Reaves accompanied singer/musician Emmylou Harris, playing bass and drums along with producer/musician Jay Joyce, on the Harris album "Hard Bargain". On April 27, 2011, the three appeared on CBS-TV's "The Late Show with David Letterman" and the following morning on NBC-TV's "Today Show."

== Discography ==
- 1986: Wunjo, MCA Master Series
- 1988: Nothing Is Lost, MCA Master Series
- 1989: Letting Go, MCA Master Series
- 1992: Sea of Glass, Hearts of Space Records
- 2001: Kaleida Visions, Space for Music
- 2001: Sacred Space, Space for Music
