= Lullaby Land (album) =

Studio album by Vampire Rodents
- Released: October 25, 1993
- Recorded: 1992–1993
- Genres: Industrial rock, sound collage, electro
- Length: 73:00
- Label: Re-Constriction
- Producer: Vampire Rodents

Vampire Rodents chronology
Premonition (1992)	Lullaby Land (1993)	Clockseed (1995)

Lullaby Land is the third studio album by Vampire Rodents, released on October 25, 1993, by Re-Constriction Records. The album utilizes strings, horns, and timpanis backed with industrial music tropes.

== Music and lyrics ==
Daniel Vahnke's lyrics focus on topics such as referring to the UN is a genocide monitor, daring Muslims to nuke Belgrade, cattle drive-by shootings, and "the only good Nazi is a dead Nazi". The album has much more emphasis on guitars than either of their previous releases, while retaining their usual sound.

The tracks "Trilobite" and "Nosedive" were made in collaboration with 'electronic junk punk' band Babyland and were first released on the Rivet Head Culture compilation under the band name Recliner. This collaboration would continue throughout the Rodents' career.

== Reception ==
Lullaby Land has been well received by critics, some even considering it among the greatest industrial albums ever recorded. Exclaim! called it their best work, saying "these folks can turn collage into counterpoint the way only masters of the avant-garde have done; Zappa comes to mind for those old enough to remember the delirious metamorphoses on Absolutely Free." Aiding & Abetting also gave it a positive review, saying "layer upon layer of samples and instruments combine into an almost symphonic orgy of sound." and compared it favorably to Public Enemy's Fear of a Black Planet. Keyboard said "Unlike the single-mindedness of death metal (which has some of the terroristic sounds and voices), this music offers more color and intellectual possibilities. But it also has industrial music's sense of intensity."

Much was said about the eclecticism of the music, with i/e praising the band for pushing the boundaries of industrial music, saying "with no repeated chorus rhymes and musical riffs, they forge ahead, staying away from stale techno and industrial treachery" and that "nobody creates the different moods and emotional states that the Vampires create." Buzz (magazine) agreed, saying "The Rodents have scoffed at conventional song formation and continue to do so, incorporation cello and violin into a deranged stew that sounds something like Robocop dismembering an orchestra. Off the beaten path as far as electronic music goes: you can dance, but these guys force you to think, too." RIP also praised the variety of the album, saying "Lullaby Land is a seething cauldron on cello (!), guitar, live percussion, and a very eccentric repertoire of samples that often implode into a 1000 points of noise," concluding that "I was particularly taken with the moody ambience of Akrotiri and propulsive density of Bosch Erotiqe."

The oppressive atmosphere of the album was also subject to praise, with Welcomat describing the music as "a merciless castigation of contemporary society" that "unfolds against a gothic backdrop and laments the strangle hold materialism, rudeness and decadence have on society." Gear credited the band with creating a cinematic experience with their music, saying they "want to create classic horror movies and are using music, not film, as their medium. Bypassing the too easy and predictable formula of blood and screams, the Rodents' vision involves nail-biting strings, don't-open-that-door horn blasts, bump-in-the-night drum beats, and mortuary vocals to provide a chair-arm gripping listening experience." Plazm noted that "it would be really hard to compare this to anything. There's just this strong emotional power that this band has through their music and leaves me dumbfounded to describe this piece of art to the fullest way."

== Track listing ==
All lyrics are written by Daniel Vahnke, except where noted; all music is composed by Daniel Vahnke, except "Passage" by Victor Wulf and "Piano Trio No. 2 in E-flat major, Op. 100, D. 929" by Franz Schubert.

No.	Title	Lyrics/Vocals	Length
1.	"Trilobite"	Dan Gatto	4:45
2.	"Catacomb"		4:05
3.	"Crib Death"		4:23
4.	"Dogchild"		3:26
5.	"Gargoyles"	Pall Jenkins	3:54
6.	"Grace"		4:34
7.	"Tremulous"		0:55
8.	"Glow Worm"		2:25
9.	"Lullaby Land"	Jared Louche	3:06
10.	"Dervish"		3:57
11.	"Scavenger"		5:08
12.	"Exuviate"		5:13
13.	"Akrotiri"		4:13
14.	"Toten Faschist"		2:27
15.	"Nosedive"	Dan Gatto	3:09
16.	"Bosch Erotique"		2:19
17.	"Hubba Hubba"		1:48
18.	"Cartouche"		1:55
19.	"Awaken"		1:46
20.	"Raga Rodentia"		5:45
21.	"Passage"		3:39

2019 Digital Re-Issue
No.	Title	Lyrics/Vocals	Length
1.	"Trilobite"	Dan Gatto	4:45
2.	"Gargoyles"	Pall Jenkins	3:54
3.	"Grace"		4:34
4.	"Dogchild"		3:26
5.	"Crib Death"		4:23
6.	"Catacomb"		4:05
7.	"Glow Worm"		2:25
8.	"Lullaby Land"	Jared Louche	3:06
9.	"Tremulous"		0:55
10.	"Scavenger"		5:08
11.	"Exuviate"		5:13
12.	"Dervish"		3:57
13.	"Akrotiri"		4:13
14.	"Toten Faschist"		2:27
15.	"Nosedive"	Dan Gatto	2:59
16.	"Bosch Erotique"		2:16
17.	"Hubba Hubba"		1:48
18.	"Cartouche"		1:55
19.	"Awaken"		1:46
20.	"Raga Rodentia"		5:45
21.	"Passage"		3:39
22.	"Lullaby Land II"		3:10
23.	"Piano Trio No. 2 in E-flat major, Op. 100, D. 929 (Variation on Schubert)"		2:28
24.	"Numbing Device" (V. Rodents' Mix)	Mark Deadrick	2:59
25.	"Nosedive" (Alternate Master)	Dan Gatto	3:09
26.	"Bosch Erotique" (Alternate Master)		2:19

== Accolades ==
Year	Publication	Country	Accolade	Rank
2011	Ondarock	Italy	"Rock Milestones"	*
"*" denotes an unordered list.

== Personnel ==
Adapted from the Lullaby Land liner notes.

Vampire Rodents

- Andrea Akastia – cello, violin
- Jing Laoshu – percussion
- Daniel Vahnke (as Anton Rathausen) – lead vocals, sampler, guitar, musical arrangement
- Victor Wulf – synthesizer

Additional musicians

- Marc C. Bennet – electric guitar (3, 14)
- Dan Gatto – lead vocals (1, 15)
- Pall Jenkins (as The Sandman) – lead vocals (5)
- Jared Louche – lead vocals (9)

Production

- Joan McAninch – mastering

== Release history ==
Region	Date	Label	Format	Catalog
United States	1993	Re-Constriction	CD	REC-008
