= Ether Bunny =

Background information
- Origin: Phoenix, Arizona, US
- Genres: Experimental big band, sound collage
- Years active: 1993–1996
- Label: Fifth Colvmn
- Spinoff of: Vampire Rodents
- Past members: Daniel Vahnke
- Website: facebook.com/VampireRodentsOfficial

Ether Bunny was the name of an experimental big band and sound collage project founded by composer Daniel Vahnke and based in Phoenix, Arizona. Ether Bunny's music was strongly influenced by the big band and cartoon music of the 30s and 40s but also drew elements from bebop, musique concrète, modern classical, hip hop, electro and industrial music. To date, Ether Bunny has released two albums: A debut album titled Papa Woody released in 1996 and a follow-up Attention Please in 2017. The name is a play on Easter Bunny.

== History ==
=== Foundation and Papa Woody (1993–96) ===
"Bunny Jump" (1996)
"Bunny Jump" (Papa Woody), composed by Daniel Vahnke

Ether Bunny was conceived in 1993 by composer Daniel Vahnke as an outlet for his experimental big band and cartoon music compositions that closely aligned to the style of his musical heroes Carl Stalling and Milt Franklyn. Vahnke realized he had sufficient material to begin a project separate from his primary sound collage outlet Vampire Rodents during the recording sessions for their third album Lullaby Land. He set aside the material recorded for the Ether Bunny project as he continued to release music under his Vampire Rodents moniker.

Papa Woody, Ether Bunny's first studio album, made its debut on Fifth Colvmn Records in 1996. Like Vampire Rodents, the music was entirely composed using Vahnke's Sample-Based Composition technique which involves creating complex music from sampled notes or measured taken from sections of previously recorded improvised or composed music. Aside from having a stronger jazz influence than Vampire Rodents, the music also featured a lighter more upbeat tone with danceable Caribbean rhythms and percussion. The work of Carl Stalling, a composer of the scores for Looney Tunes and Disney's Silly Symphony series, served as a major influence on the album's sound. Vahnke has claimed that he wrote the album with the intention of exposing his composition technique as well as big band music to a younger audience. Vahnke had intended to release a follow-up album titled Toybox but his plans fell through when Fifth Colvmn experienced legal issues that lead to its closure in 1997.

Ether Bunny's music fared well critically and was favorably compared to the work of Foetus, Jack Dangers and The Lounge Lizards. Critic Vincent N. Cecolini praised Vahnke for his innovative approach to composition, saying "by mixing original the music with programmed drums and sound effects, he not only creates a vivid aural collage of acid jazz, bebop and dance music, but also proves just how timeless the original music is." Vahnke's skills on a sampler were also commended, with Aiding & Abetting describing his editing as "astonishing" and "seamless". A critic for Sonic Boom applauded the diversity and humor of the music saying "I feel that this release in bettered intended for the real music connoisseur who will take the time to understand all the hidden elements placed throughout the album and yet still enjoy the play on words used in naming all the tracks on the album."

=== Project Revival and Attention Please (2016–present) ===
In 2016, Vahnke established official YouTube and Facebook pages that serve as outlets for unreleased compositions, including Ether Bunny compositions. Material that was recorded and intended to be released as Ether Bunny's second album was made available to the public for the first time. In 2017, the band started its official bandcamp page and began digitally issuing their back catalog along with unreleased material.

Ether Bunny's second full-length album Attention Please saw its official release on December 28, 2017.

== Discography ==
Studio albums

- Papa Woody (Fifth Colvmn, 1996)
- Attention Please (Rodentia Productions, 2017)
