= Vampire Rodents =

Sound collage from Phoenix, Arizona

- Vampire Rodents circa 1993, from left to right: Victor Wulf; Andrea Akastia; Daniel Vahnke

Background information
- Origin: Phoenix, Arizona, US
- Genres: Experimental rock, sound collage, industrial
- Years active: 1989–1996
- Labels: Dossier; Fifth Colvmn; Re-Constriction; V.R.
- Past members: Andrea Akastia; Daniel Vahnke; Victor Wulf
- Website: facebook.com/VampireRodentsOfficial

Vampire Rodents was a sound collage and experimental music ensemble based out of Phoenix, Arizona, although its core members originally came from Canada. The creative nucleus of the project comprised vocalist and composer Daniel Vahnke and keyboardist Victor Wulf. Daniel Vahnke was primarily influenced by 20th-century classical and avant-garde music, whereas Wulf drew from new age, ambient and synth-driven pop music. Their work also dabbled in big band, bebop, musique concrète, industrial, electro, Indian classical, and Greek music.

Vampire Rodents debuted with War Music (1991), an album that showcased their knack for dark humor and experimentation with the pop and industrial music format. Premonition (1992), recorded with violinist and cellist Andrea Akastia, revealed the band's artistic ambitious and interest in electroacoustic and ambient music. Considered by some to be the group's magnum opus, Lullaby Land (1993) further expanded the sound with the inclusion of additional musicians, house beats, swing rhythms and world music.

In 1993, Akastia and Wulf ceased to make direct contributions to Vampire Rodents and it became Vahnke's solo project, although he continued to utilize music his former bandmates had recorded previous to their departure. Vampire Rodents embraced an electro-industrial sound informed by orchestral music on Clockseed (1995) with the help of producer Chase and the contributions of numerous musicians already established in the 1990s industrial rock scene. The final album, Gravity's Rim (1996), returned to the more aggressive and sardonic nature of past work while emphasizing dense string and horn arrangements backed by drum machine rhythms.

Vampire Rodents' last recordings were made in 1996 when Vahnke was preparing the follow-up to Gravity's Rim. Legal issues with Fifth Colvmn Records unexpectedly halted activity and the project was put on hiatus. After over a decade of inactivity, Daniel Vahnke officially announced his musical retirement and the project's abandonment in 2009. In 2016, Vahnke established an official YouTube page titled Rodentia Productions and began issuing unreleased material with the suggestion that it would be made available for purchase. On November 11, 2017, Vampire Rodents' sixth album, Noises in the Wall, was issued digitally on their official Bandcamp page.

== History ==
=== Early years in Toronto (1987–1989) ===
Composers Daniel Vahnke and Victor Wulf met while studying anthropology at the university of Toronto. Victor had been composing film music under pseudonyms since 1977 and was composing experimental pop track with samplers during the 1980s. Daniel had been working on player piano pieces based on Chinese character stroke analysis since 1986. They began collaborating in 1987 and composed several independent films scores together. In June 1989, they began a project that incorporated elements of industrial rock and sound collage, which was conceived as a form of self-entertainment and as a way to play a joke on the music industry. They named the project Vampire Rodents after an animal skull with two large incisors that Vahnke discovered on an Anthropological dig in Arizona.

=== War Music and move to Arizona (1989–1990) ===
"Success" (1990)
"Success" (War Music), written by Daniel Vahnke and Victor Wulf

By 1989, the duo had relocated to Phoenix, Arizona and enlisted the aid of Karl Geist on bass guitar and keyboards, Ivan Koci on guitar and Jing Laoshu on percussion. Recording for War Music was completed in January 1990. Vahnke chose to compose and record under an alias, and was credited as Anton Rathausen on every Vampire Rodent release. He would use the alias when being interviewed and would ask that the interviewer address Vahnke and Rathausen as separate people.

Like other industrial rock at the time, the compositions of War Music made heavy use of sampled movie and television dialogue. Because of this, coupled with Vahnke's vocal technique, publications drew comparisons between the Rodents' music and that of early Skinny Puppy. The album also received attention for the lyrics, which utilized dark humor to sardonically critique Western culture.

=== Premonition and experimental phase (1990–1992) ===
"Demon est Deus inversus" (1992)
"Demon est Deus inversus" (Premonition), demonstrating influence of musique concrète and modern classical composers

Geist left the band after the release of War Music, opting to seek employment with the Bristol-based label Words of Warning. Vahnke and Wulf realized the artistic merit of their project and began moving away from the mock industrial rock of War Music to draw inspiration from electroacoustic and ambient music. In 1991, the duo issued a thirty-minute cassette tape titled Premonition, which would serve as the foundation for their second full-length album.

Premonition was expanded and completed in 1992 with violinist and cellist Andrea Akastia. The album garnered further praise from critics and the band began to receive wider notice, with tracks such as "Sitio" receiving airplay on the college radio stations.

=== Lullaby Land and critical acclaim (1992–1993) ===
"Catacomb" (1993)
"Catacomb" (Lullaby Land), demonstrating mix of house beats and string samples

Premonition caught the attention of industrial music label Re-Constriction Records, who adopted the band into its roster. Lullaby Land was released in 1993 and marked a musical maturity for Vampire Rodents. The music boasted house beats, swing rhythms and world music influences while continuing to explore avant-garde and industrial music. It also marked the first time Vampire Rodents collaborated with guest musicians, utilizing the singing talents of Dan Grotta of Babyland; Jared Hendrickson of Chemlab; and Pall Jenkins of Three Mile Pilot. After the album's release, Akastia and Wulf scaled back their involvement with Vampire Rodents to pursue other interests. Their final in-studio collaboration was the track "Lizardman", which was released on the Masked Beauty in a Sea of Sadness various artists compilation.

Lullaby Land was well received by critics upon its release. Exclaim! called it their best work, saying "these folks can turn collage into counterpoint the way only masters of the avant-garde have done; Zappa comes to mind for those old enough to remember the delirious metamorphoses on Absolutely Free." Gear credited the band with creating a cinematic experience with their music, saying they "want to create classic horror movies and are using music, not film, as their medium." Much was also said concerning the eclecticism of the music, with RIP and i/e crediting the band for pushing the boundaries of industrial music, the latter saying "with no repeated chorus rhymes and musical riffs, they forge ahead, staying away from stale techno and industrial treachery" and that "nobody creates the different moods and emotional states that the Vampires create."

=== Clockseed and mainstream sound (1992–1995) ===
"Mother Tongue" (1995)
"Mother Tongue" (Clockseed) By 1995, their music had begun to prominently utilize dance beats informed by electro and hip hop music

With Vampire Rodents essentially becoming his solo project, Vahnke decided to take the music in a different direction. He began moving away from the dissonant industrial sound that characterized his earlier work to focus on composing lush arrangements comprising clarinets, bassoons, trumpets, trombones, flutes, oboes and saxophones. The music became more dependent on dance beats and informed by electro and even hip hop music.

1995's Clockseed introduced this new sound, with heavy emphasis placed on dance beats and vocals. Guest involvement had been increased to feature a new vocalist on every song, with Vahnke providing vocals for only four of the twenty-two tracks. Because of this, the lyrics contain social commentary more typical of industrial rock and electronica and less of Vahnke's grotesque humor. In an interview with Under the Volcano, Vahnke explained the reasoning behind the collaborative process: "We've always felt that it was important to have as much vocal diversity as possible. Clockseed finally brings the whole concept together, thanks to all the great singers who volunteered their effort and ingenuity. Chase [head of Re-Constriction] was instrumental in orchestrating the whole process. We're continuing to work with nearly 25 vocalists and following a similar approach. I think the experimental "hands off" policy seems to bring excellent results. It gives us new challenges to create for these artists." He further stated "We try to give a vocalist a challenging task. Often we intentionally offer a track totally unlike what the artist is used to working with." Besides connecting Vahnke with the contributing artists, Chase also provided loops for the music.

=== Gravity's Rim and hiatus (1995–2016) ===
"Underneath" (1996)
"Underneath" (Gravity's Rim), demonstrating further emphasis of dense string and horn arrangements backed by drum machine rhythms

At the advice of Chase and Jared Hendrickson, Vahnke decided to continue issuing his work under Fifth Colvmn Records. In 1996, Gravity's Rim was released and marked a return to the more aggressive and sardonic nature of past work while emphasizing dense string and horn arrangements backed by drum machine rhythms. Returning collaborators included Maria Azevedo, Dave Creadeau, Mark Edwards, Jared Hendrickson and Boom chr Paige. The album also predominantly featured Spahn Ranch and future Black Tape for a Blue Girl vocalist Athan Maroulis, who contributed to four tracks.

Vahnke was especially prolific at this point and was interested in touring the band and launching several musical projects across several genres. This included a new Vampire Rodents album, slated for release in 1997. It was intended to be an entirely instrumental double disc album titled Noises in the Wall and would have comprised music recorded between 1993 and 1996. A re-imagining of Franz Schubert's Piano Trio No. 2, op. 100, D. 929 that was recorded for the album appeared on a Cleopatra Records compilation and five tracks that would have been part of the first disc were made available through the band's official Myspace page in January 2008. Plans to remaster and re-issue the entire Rodent catalog were also made.

Vahnke was unable to find a record label to issue his work and was lacked the means necessary to release compositions himself. In 2002, he had expressed his desire to establish an mpg. site to make his work accessible to the public. Vahnke and officially announced his retirement from music in 2009. He mentioned in an interview that he had in his possession three hours of completed Vampire Rodents tracks as well as another three hours of other compositions that he has been unable to find an outlet for.

=== Hiatus and project revival (2016–present) ===
In 2016, Vahnke established official YouTube and Facebook pages that serve as outlets for unreleased compositions, including Vampire Rodents compositions. An abridged version of Noises in the Wall as well as "Smartass", the intended final track of Gravity's Rim, have been made available to the public for the first time since they were recorded. In 2017, the band started its official bandcamp page and began digitally issuing their back catalog along with unreleased material.

Vampire Rodents' sixth album Noises in the Wall was officially released for the first time on November 11, 2017. Ostensibly a double album, Noises in the Wall is the band's longest release to date and, in the spirit of Vahnke's Ether Bunny project, is Vampire Rodents' only entirely instrumental album. The album well received critically, with reviewer's praising the wide scope of musical genres and styles. The ten part suite "Zombie Dolls", the frantic industrial collage of "Good Humour", the eight-minute composition "Cyborghostsex", the electroacoustic "Itume" and Vahnke's interpretation of Schubert's "Piano Trio No. 2" were referenced as being among the album's high points.

== Musical style ==
=== Vocals and lyrics ===
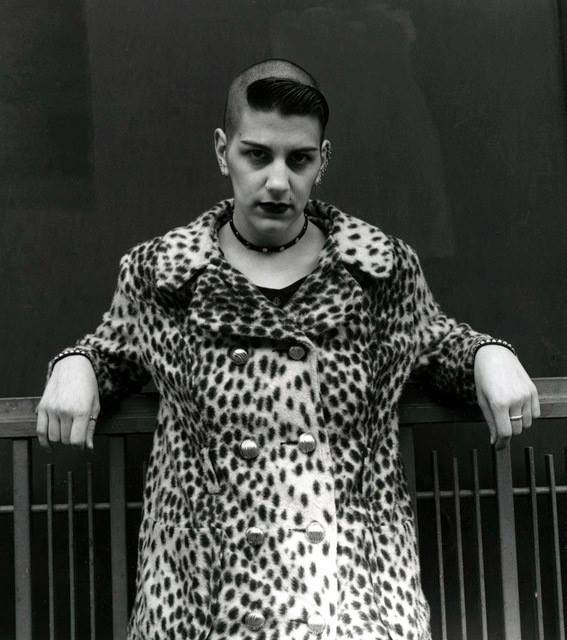
Maria Azevedo of Battery provided vocals for several songs on Clockseed and Gravity's Rim.

Based on A Modest Proposal, "Abortion Clinic Deli" is one of their more raunchy songs, with lyrics championing the consuming of aborted fetuses for both protein and pleasure. Songs like "Dumme Weisse Menschen", which translates to "stupid white people", critique of Western culture while "Tatoo" is critical of hollow vogues. The collaborating artists who contributed the vocals to songs on Lullaby Land, Clockseed and Gravity's Rim also penned their own lyrics. For example, Jared Hendrickson's "Low Orbit" is about two of his deceased friends appearing to him in his sleep and "Revisioned" by Sounds of Mass Production concerns systemic oppression at the hands of the government and establishment.

=== Composition technique ===
The music of Vampire Rodents is entirely created by sampled music. Vahnke takes sections of previously recorded improvised or composed music and edits, notates and catalogues it in his sample database for later use. Shying away from using modern or high-end equipment, Vahnke prefers utilizing two Roland S-50s and a Commodore 64 for sequencing the samples. He usually begins composing by structuring the piece with drum beats, the percussion is mostly structured around several interlocking loops. The melodic content enters the picture secondly, with the sampled sections sequenced in order of instrumental dominance.

Vahnke previously worked in modern classical music but became frustrated because, "Most music in your head cannot be realized by instruments because of the octave's twelve-interval restrictions." More in keeping with real sounds, quarter tones expand the piano's octave from 12 to 28 keys. Vahnke felt sampling allowed more freedom when composing his pieces. Not intended for replication in a live setting, Vahnke constructed sample-based pieces on linear time graphs in a manner similar to Conlon Nancarrow's player-piano roll compositions.

== Other projects ==
Besides Vampire Rodents, both Daniel Vahnke and Victor Wulf have been involved in separate musical projects. After Wulf parted from the band in 1993, after which he began composing and releasing solo work under the name Dilate. Influenced by ambient and new-age music, Dilate released two albums, Cyclos in 1996 and Octagon the following year. Both were issued by Hypnotic Records, a sublabel of Cleopatra Records, and mostly well received by critics.

Vahnke began writing and recording music for his big band-influenced project Ether Bunny in 1993. Ether Bunny's debut studio album, titled Papa Woody, was released on Fifth Colvmn Records in 1996. Vahnke has pointed to Papa Woody as containing the music he is most proud of and he intended to follow up that release with a second album titled Toy Box, which was eventually released in 2017 as Attention Please. In the years between the release of Gravity's Rim and his retirement from music, Vahnke composed for several composition projects with the intention of collaborating with artists he had worked with previously. This included an ambient music album called Obsidian with Maria Azevedo and her band Battery, an adult contemporary pop music oriented project with Athan Maroulis called Alchemia and a collaboration with vocalist Eric Powell of 16Volt called Pillow. An album titled Axon Tremolo, collecting music that was originally recorded for Alchemia, made its debut on Vahnke's official Bandcamp. The album ElevatorMan, a collaboration between Daniel Vahnke Vahnke and Phoenix musician Otis Francis, was released in 2020 and included half original songs and half cover versions of Roy Acuff, Johnny Cash, Leonard Cohen, Dick Jurgens and Elvis Presley.

== Band members ==
Former members

- Andrea Akastia – strings (1991–1994)
- Daniel Vahnke – vocals, sampler (1989–1996)
- Victor Wulf – keyboards (1989–1994)

Timeline

== Discography ==
Studio albums

- War Music (V.R., 1990)
- Premonition (V.R., 1992)
- Lullaby Land (Re-Constriction, 1993)
- Clockseed (Re-Constriction, 1995)
- Gravity's Rim (Fifth Colvmn, 1996)
- Noises in the Wall (Rodentia Productions, 2017)
