= Fascist Communist Revolutionaries =

Compilation album by Various artists
- Released: September 24, 1996
- Genre: Industrial rock
- Length: 67:57
- Label: Fifth Colvmn

Fifth Colvmn Records chronology
| Echo (1996) | Fascist Communist Revolutionaries (1996) | We're All Frankies (1996) |

Fascist Communist Revolutionaries is a various artists compilation album released on September 24, 1996 by Fifth Colvmn Records. It was the second Fifth Colvmn Records compilation and was released to celebrate the three year anniversary of the label.

== Reception ==
Jon Worley of Aiding & Abetting gave Fascist Communist Revolutionaries a mixed review, calling the compilation "a nice a starting point for the uninitiated, but not as important for current fans" but described the tracks by Dessau, Trust Obey and Vampire Rodents as "worth the price of admission." Sonic Boom said "the album serves as an excellent example of the current FCR style with many of the FCR's own bands present as well as a handful of licensed material from European labels."

== Track listing ==
| No. | Title | Writer(s) | Artist | Length |
|---|---|---|---|---|
| 1. | "Exile" (Extended Remix) | Jared Louche; Dylan Thomas More | Chemlab | 4:59 |
| 2. | "Suffered" (Extended Remix) | Van Christie; Jason McNinch | Dessau | 6:03 |
| 3. | "Queener" (Booty Banger Mix) | Ethan Novak; Gregory A. Lopez; Jamie Duffy; Jason Novak | Acumen | 6:29 |
| 4. | "Fucked Up Generation" (Fuck-N-Suck-Gen) | Mark Blasquez; Linda LeSabre | Death Ride 69 | 4:20 |
| 5. | "Distractor" | Bryan Barton; Charles Levi; Krayge Tyler | haloblack | 5:13 |
| 6. | "Hands of Clay" (Schwer Geprüft Mix) | John Bergin | Trust Obey | 8:23 |
| 7. | "Dim" | Greg Lucas; Anthony Srock | Final Cut | 5:41 |
| 8. | "Gravida" | Mauro Teho Teardo | Meathead | 5:31 |
| 9. | "The Brain Cult of Macho Irony" (Swamp Terrorists Remix) | Templebeat | Templebeat | 5:39 |
| 10. | "Blind Acceleration" | Daniel Vahnke | Vampire Rodents | 2:54 |
| 11. | "Need to Destroy" | Sarah Folkman; George Sarah | THC | 4:10 |
| 12. | "Reported" (Die Krupps Remix) | Dirk Ivens | Dive | 3:06 |
| 13. | "Texas" | Carl Harrison; James Ray | James Ray and The Performance | 5:29 |

== Personnel ==
Adapted from the Fascist Communist Revolutionaries liner notes.

- John Bergin – cover art, design
- Zalman Fishman – executive-producer

== Release history ==
| Region | Date | Label | Format | Catalog |
|---|---|---|---|---|
| United States | 1996 | Fifth Colvmn | CD | 9868-63239 |
