= Killing Floor (American band) =

American electro-industrial group

- Origin: San Francisco, California, U.S.
- Genres: Electro-industrial
- Years active: 1989–1998
- Labels: Re-Constriction
- Past members: James Basore; John Belew; Marc Phillips; Karl Tellefsen; Christian Void

Killing Floor were a 1990s American electro-industrial group based in San Francisco. The original incarnation consisted of keyboardists John Belew and Christian Void before guitarist Marc Phillips, percussionist James Basore and bassist Karl Tellefsen were added to the line-up. They released two albums on Re-Constriction Records: Killing Floor in 1995 and Divide by Zero in 1997. The band ceased activities shortly after the release of their 1998 EP Come Together.

== History ==
Killing Floor was formed in San Francisco by John Belew and Christian Void, with Void on both vocal and keyboard/sampler duties. The band is named after the sonic torture chamber in William Gibson's cyberpunk short-story Johnny Mnemonic. Their music was characterized by heavy use of samples and electronics over dance beats. Guitarist Marc Phillips joined the band in 1991, followed by percussionist James Basore and bassist Karl Tellefsen in early 1994. They caught the interest of the electro-industrial label Re-Constriction and were signed in mid-1994.

The band issued their debut Killing Floor on March 14, 1995. The band was praised for its original balance of guitar and club music oriented material, which critics claimed made Killing Floor standout in comparison to other industrial acts at the time. Their second album Divide by Zero was released on September 23, 1997. The band recorded in a more collaborative way because they had more free time to express themselves in studio. Divide by Zero was a change in artistic direction for Killing Floor and saw the band integrating stronger elements of punk and electronic into their music, which drew them comparison to grunge.

The band released their final release, the single Come Together, in 1998. The band ceased activities shortly thereafter.

== Discography ==
=== Studio albums ===
- Killing Floor (1995, Re-Constriction)
- Divide by Zero (1997, Re-Constriction)

=== EPs ===
- Come Together (1998, Re-Constriction)
