= Marc Phillips =

Welsh politician (born 1953)

Marc Phillips (born 8 December 1953) is a Welsh charity manager and former Plaid Cymru politician.

Phillips was born in Cardiff and educated in Cyfarthfa and Merthyr Tydfil, before working at the Urdd Gobaith Cymru, then the Dyfed Association of Voluntary Service and as Chief Executive of Tenovus.

Phillips also became active in Plaid Cymru, standing in Llanelli at the 1992 and 1997 general elections, taking third and then second place. He became Plaid's national vice-chair in 1993, serving for two years. During this period, he stood in the 1994 European election in Mid and West Wales, achieving the party's best performance at the election.

From 1996 until 2000, Phillips served as the Chair of Plaid Cymru, and he also stood for the party in the new Wales constituency at the 1999 European election. He was third on the party list and was not elected.

Phillips accepted a new job as the head of BBC Children in Need in Wales in 2002, following which he withdrew from political activity. However, he remained supportive of the party, was its nomination for the Executive Committee of the All Wales Convention in 2009, and unsuccessfully applied to be its candidate in the Carmarthen East and Dinefwr constituency at the 2010 general election.

He is on the Board of Directors, of Pen y Cymoedd Wind Energy Project.

Party political offices
Preceded by Jill Evans	Chair of Plaid Cymru; 1996–2000	Succeeded by John Dixon
