= Victor Wulf =

Canadian keyboard player and composer

- Genres: Sound collage, ambient
- Occupation: Musician
- Years active: 1989–1997
- Label: Cleopatra
- Formerly of: Dilate, Vampire Rodents

Victor Wulf is a Canadian keyboard player and composer. He is recognized for his solo ambient music project Dilate and as a founding member of sound collage band Vampire Rodents.

== Biography ==
Victor Wulf was involved in composing music for television since 1977. In June 1989, Wulf and Vahnke founded Vampire Rodents, a project that incorporated elements of industrial rock and sound collage. The duo released three albums: War Music (1990), Premonition (1992) and Lullaby Land (1993). During this time, Wulf was primary influenced by Can, Bernard Herrmann, John Zorn and big band music.

Wulf became less involved in the writing process with each album and he decided to leave Vampire Rodents after the release of Lullaby Land. Wulf founded his own ambient music project Dilate in 1995. After being picked up by Cleopatra Records, he released Cyclos in early 1996. Octagon was released in 1997.

== Discography ==
Dilate

- Cyclos (Cleopatra, 1996)
- Octagon (Cleopatra, 1997)

Vampire Rodents

- War Music (V.R., 1990)
- Premonition (V.R., 1992)
- Lullaby Land (Re-Constriction, 1993)
