= Daniel Vahnke =

Canadian composer (born 1965)

- Born: April 2, 1965 (age 61)
- Origin: Toronto, Ontario, Canada
- Genres: Industrial, Modern classical
- Occupations: Musician, composer, lyricist
- Instruments: Vocals, Sampler, Guitar
- Years active: 1985–present
- Labels: Dossier, Fifth Colvmn, Re-Constriction, Vampire Rodents Productions
- Formerly of: Vampire Rodents; Ether Bunny
- Website: Official website

Daniel Vahnke (born April 2, 1965), sometimes credited as Anton Rathausen, is a Canadian composer and lyricist. He is best known as a co-founding member of Vampire Rodents, a band that integrated elements of classical, ambient, and industrial music into its work. Daniel uses German, Latin and Chinese in his compositions.

== History ==
Daniel Vahnke studied anthropology in Toronto while working on piano pieces based on Chinese character stroke analysis. After the purchase of his first Roland S-50, Daniel became fascinated with Sample Based Composition, considering it a cleaner, safer, and more efficient method of creating music. In 1988, he created Vampire Rodents with his friend Victor Wulf, who had been writing experimental pop music, as a form of entertainment. However, the band soon developed into a creative outlet for Daniel's darkly humorous lyrics as well as some of his anti-human ideals.

His last commercially available project, Papa Woody, was released in 1996 under the name Ether Bunny, although it was basically a solo effort. Serving as his personal tribute to the cartoon and jazz music, Vahnke claims to have been more satisfied with his work on Papa Woody than on any Vampire Rodents album. A collaboration with Athan Maroulis called Alchemia, later renamed Obsidian, was planned for release in 1997 but never came into fruition. The overall project was described as a SBC and LTG approach to The Blue Nile with string orchestra. Also, a completely instrumental Vampire Rodent album was completed the same year, but like the Alcemia/Obsidian project was shelved indefinitely.

== Personal life ==
To give his vocal "characters" an individual identity, he decided to work under the alias Anton Rathausen.

Although he rarely watches movies or television, Daniel remains an admirer of cartoons. His favorite films are Life of Brian, RocketMan, The Incredible Mr. Limpet, Shaun of the Dead, and Incredible Shrinking Man. However, Daniel has claimed that "Most films are best enjoyed played in reverse with several CD players playing random damaged CD's as an augmented soundtrack."

== Musical style and influences ==
Working mostly with samples, Daniel uses a Roland S-50 and a Commodore 64 to create his music. Unlike other artists who use a similar technique, he has been noted for "tweaking and twisting originals to create something new instead of simply relying on a familiar hook for instant recognition." Although occasionally being listed as Industrial, Daniel has stated that it does not define his work, noting that he has paid very little attention to the scene.

Daniel's musical influences range from cartoon music (Milt Franklyn, Carl Stalling), impressionist music (Claude Debussy, Maurice Ravel), avant-garde (György Ligeti, Luigi Nono, Edgard Varèse), electronic (Luciano Berio, Tod Dockstader, İlhan Mimaroğlu, Karlheinz Stockhausen), classical (Johann Sebastian Bach, Igor Stravinsky), ambient (Steve Roach), as well as big band music (Benny Goodman). Vahnke has also spoken about admiring modern rock artists such as The Young Gods, Einstürzende Neubauten, Tom Waits, Sigur Rós, and The Blue Nile.

== Discography ==
- Music for Player Piano (2018, Rodentia Productions)
- Early Soundtrack Sketches, Vol. I (2018, Rodentia Productions)
- Early Soundtrack Sketches, Vol. II (2018, Rodentia Productions)
