= Jared Louche discography =

- Studio albums: 18
- EPs: 2
- Compilation albums: 4
- Video albums: 1
- Remix albums: 1

This article details the complete oeuvre of American musician Jared Louche, including his work with The Aliens, Altered Statesmen, Chemlab, H3llb3nt, Peach of Immortality, Pigface, Progrex.iv and Vampire Rodents. In 1999 Louche released his debut solo album titled Covergirl on Fifth Colvmn Records.

== Discography ==
=== Peach of Immortality ===
==== Studio albums ====
Title	Album details
Need (Thee)!	Released: 1984 (US); Label: Adult Contemporary; Formats: CS
Talking Heads '77	Released: 1985 (US); Label: Adult Contemporary; Formats: LP
"Jehovah" My Black Ass-R.E.M. Is Air Supply!	Released: 1986 (US); Label: Adult Contemporary; Formats: CS
The Best MUX!	Released: 1986 (US); Label: Adult Contemporary; Formats: CS
"23" of 26 State and Federal Obscenity Determinations/Taxi Corpus II	Released: 1996 (US); Label: Chocolate Monk; Formats: CS

==== Video albums ====
Title	Album details
Succumbs (Restored)	Released: 1991 (US); Label: Pum!; Formats: VHS

=== Chemlab ===
==== Studio albums ====
Title	Album details
Burn Out at the Hydrogen Bar	Released: March 22, 1993 (US); Label: Fifth Colvmn/Metal Blade; Formats: CD, CS
East Side Militia	Released: October 8, 1996 (US); Label: Fifth Colvmn/Metal Blade; Formats: CD, CS, LP
Oxidizer	Released: January 27, 2004 (US); Label: Underground Inc.; Formats: CD

==== Remix albums ====
Title	Album details
Rock Whore vs. Dance Floor	Released: March 14, 2006 (US); Label: Invisible/Underground, Inc.; Formats: CD

==== Compilation albums ====
Title	Album details
Magnetic Field Remixes	Released: October 11, 1994 (US); Label: Fifth Colvmn/Metal Blade; Formats: CD
Suture	Released: January 23, 2001 (US); Label: Invisible; Formats: CD
Tape Decay	Released: September 18, 2019 (US); Label: Armalyte Industries; Formats: CD

==== Extended plays ====
Title	Album details
10 Ton Pressure	Released: 1990 (US); Label: Fifth Colvmn; Formats: CD
The Machine Age	Released: 2003 (US); Label: Underground, Inc.; Formats: CD

=== H3llb3nt ===
==== Studio albums ====
Title	Album details
0.01	Released: February 20, 1996 (US); Label: Fifth Colvmn; Formats: CD
Helium	Released: February 16, 1998 (US); Label: Re-Constriction; Formats: CD
Hardcore Vanilla	Released: January 13, 2001 (US); Label: Invisible; Formats: CD

==== Compilation albums ====
Title	Album details
Regurgitator	Released: May 29, 2001 (US); Label: Invisible; Formats: CD

=== proGREX.iv ===
Title	Album details
reINVENTION opERATION	Released: February 18, 1997 (US); Label: Full Contact; Formats: CD

=== Jared Louche and The Aliens ===
Title	Album details
Covergirl	Released: September 28, 1999 (US); Label: Invisible; Formats: CD

=== Prude ===
Title	Album details
The Dark Age of Consent	Released: September 23, 2014 (US); Label: Metropolis; Formats: CD, LP, DL

=== Altered Statesmen ===
Title	Album details
Death of Radio Mars	Released: May 12, 2013 (US); Label: Lens; Formats: CD

==== Compilation albums ====
Title	Album details
Radio Mars Edits	Released: July 2, 2013 (US); Label: Lens; Formats: DL

== Credits ==
Year	Artist	Release	Role(s)	Song(s)
1992	Thud	Life & Death	backing vocals, production, mixing	—
1992	Thud	Life & Death	guitar	"Image Pig", "Ventilator"
1992	Thud	Life & Death	writing	"Image Pig"
1993	Vampire Rodents	Lullaby Land	vocals	"Lullaby Land"
1995	Vampire Rodents	Clockseed	vocals	"Low Orbit"
1995	To Live and Shave in L.A.	Vedder Vedder Bedwetter	guitar	"Throws Cunt a Tear", "The The, Which Radiance Overdrenched", "Shut the Second She Clawed", "Cobwebs With 'Trap' Primrose", "The The Perms", "'A,' The Swinging She-River", "Brother Falling, Twat From Fool"
1995	To Live and Shave in L.A.	Vedder Vedder Bedwetter	backing vocals	"Cobwebs With "Trap" Primrose"
1996	Ether Bunny	Papa Woody	voice	"Wee"
1996	Vampire Rodents	Gravity's Rim	vocals	"Beta", "Code"
1996	Adversary	The Winter's Harvest	backing vocals	"Ah Pook the Destroyer"
1996	Gravy	After That It's All Gravy	executive-producer	—
1998	Pigface	Eat Shit You Fucking Redneck	vocals	—
2001	Pigface	The Best of Pigface: Preaching to the Perverted	vocals	"War Ich Nicht", "Amphetaminemethamphetamine", "Girls Are Cool"
2003	Pigface	Easy Listening...	writing, vocals	"Binary Stream"
2004	The Eighties Matchbox B-Line Disaster	Mister Mental	vocals	"Morning Has Broken"
2006	Enduser	Pushing Back	vocals	"The Maker"
2007	Caustic	Booze Up and Riot	vocals	"Another Fist in the Ass"
2008	25men	The Dancing Wu Li Masters	vocals	—
2009	Reformed Faction	I Am the Source of Light, I Am Not a Mirror	vocals	"Jah Jah Jah Ney", "We Think Bliss"
2009	Hepster Pat	Hepsters Paradise	remix	"Search and Destroy" (Hepster Pat Mix)
2010	The Pain Machinery	Urban Survival	vocals	—
2011	Dead Voices on Air	Michael and the Angels Fought	vocals	"Sudden"
2011	Sinsect	Bug Life	writing	"Derailer"
2016	K.P. Riot Brigade	K.P. Riot Brigade	vocals	"Diseased"
