= The Best of Sixteen Volt =

Compilation album by 16volt
- Released: May 31, 2005
- Recorded: 1993 – 2003
- Genre: Industrial metal; industrial rock
- Length: 102:39
- Label: Cleopatra
- Producer: Eric Powell

16volt chronology
SuperCoolNothing V2.0 (2002)	The Best of Sixteen Volt (2005)	FullBlackHabit (2007)

The Best of Sixteen Volt is a compilation album by 16volt, released on May 10, 2005, by Cleopatra Records. It comprises songs from the band's first four releases as selected by fans through the band's website. Disc two was recorded live in 2003 at the Cabaret Metro, Chicago.

== Reception ==
Professional ratings
Review scores
Source	Rating
AllMusic	2.5/5 stars

Stewart Mason of AllMusic gave The Best of Sixteen Volt: 1993-2003 two and a half out of five stars and the album "only for the most die-hard genre purists; the addition of an 11-track live set recorded at Chicago's Cabaret Metro in 2003 might entice hardcore fans who already have the songs on disc one, which makes its muddy sound (Powell's vocals are largely inaudible, and not in the way that vocals are usually buried in the mix in this style of music) and sloppy performances something of an insult."

== Track listing ==
All tracks are written by 16volt.

Disc one
No.	Title	Writer(s)	Album (date)	Length
1.	"Motorskill"	Bornzin, Fell, Powell, Taylor	Wisdom (1993)	5:12
2.	"Wisdom"	Bornzin, Fell, Powell, Taylor	Wisdom (1993)	4:05
3.	"Head of Stone"	Bornzin, Fell, Powell, Taylor	Wisdom (1993)	5:11
4.	"Uplift"	Powell, Taylor, Vinhasa	Skin (1994)	3:51
5.	"Slow Wreck"	Powell, Taylor, Vinhasa	Skin (1994)	4:47
6.	"Stitched"	Powell, Taylor, Vinhasa	Skin (1994)	4:45
7.	"Perfectly Fake"	Powell, Taylor, Vinhasa	Skin (1994)	5:12
8.	"Swarm"	LaCorte, Powell	LetDownCrush (1996)	3:25
9.	"A Cloth Like Gauze"	Powell	LetDownCrush (1996)	4:02
10.	"Two Wires Thin"	Powell	LetDownCrush (1996)	4:01
11.	"Crush"	LaCorte, Powell	LetDownCrush (1996)	4:50
12.	"I Fail Truth"	Peoples, Powell	SuperCoolNothing (1998)	3:27
13.	"Don't Pray"	Peoples, Powell	SuperCoolNothing (1998)	4:37
14.	"Keep Sleeping"	Peoples, Powell	SuperCoolNothing (1998)	3:16
15.	"And I Go"	Peoples, Powell	SuperCoolNothing (1998)	4:26

Disc two
No.	Title	Writer(s)	Length
1.	"Intro"		1:53
2.	"Swarm"	LaCorte, Powell	3:15
3.	"Everyday Everything"	Peoples, Powell	3:18
4.	"Machine Kit"	Peoples, Powell	3:07
5.	"American Porn Song"	Peoples, Powell	3:43
6.	"Skin"	Powell, Taylor, Vinhasa	3:26
7.	"Keep Sleeping"	Peoples, Powell	2:55
8.	"Perfectly Fake"	Powell, Taylor, Vinhasa	3:33
9.	"Happy Pill"	Peoples, Powell	4:08
10.	"Suffering You"	DeSalvo, Peoples, Powell	3:32
11.	"The Cut Collector"	Powell	4:42

== Personnel ==
Adapted from The Best of Sixteen Volt liner notes.

16volt

- Joel Bornzin – acoustic drums (1, 3)
- John "Servo" DeSalvo – drums
- Jon Fell – additional guitars (2)
- Marc LaCorte – guitars (10)
- Eric Powell – lead vocals, guitars, programming, production, recording, mixing
- Mike Peoples – bass guitar, guitars
- Jeff Taylor – guitars (5, 6, 7)
- William Tucker – guitars (10)
- Von Vinhasa – acoustic drums (6, 7)

Additional performers

- Bryan Barton – sampler (10)
- A.P. Boone – sampler (1)
- Dan Pred – acoustic drums (9)
- Stella – vocals (8)
- Chris Thomas – guitars (1, 3)
- Kraig Tyler – guitars
- Chris Vrenna – live drums (Tracks 12, 13, 14, 15)
- Clint Walsh – stage guitars

Production and design

- Keith Auerbach – recording, mixing
- Bill Kennedy – recording, mixing
- Tony Lash – recording, mixing
- Jeff "Critter" Newell – recording, mixing
- Dave Ogilvie – recording, mixing

== Release history ==
Region	Date	Label	Format	Catalog
United States	2005	Cleopatra	CD	CLP 1502
