= Regurgitator (album) =

Compilation album by H3llb3nt
- Released: May 29, 2001
- Recorded: 1995 – 2001
- Studio: Various: Black Socket, London; (London, UK); Crush Studios; (Hell, CA); Doctor Digital; (Portland, OR); Electric Music Foundation; (Minneapolis, MN); Fast Forward; (New York City, NY)
- Genre: Electro-industrial
- Length: 64:00
- Label: Invisible
- Producer: H3llb3nt

H3llb3nt chronology
Hardcore Vanilla (2001)	Regurgitator (2001)

Regurgitator is a compilation album by H3llb3nt, released on May 29, 2001 by Invisible Records. It contains tracks drawn from the band's first two releases, 0.01 and Helium.

== Track listing ==
All tracks are written by H3llb3nt.

No.	Title	From artist (date)	Length
1.	"Regress"	Helium (1998)	0:37
2.	"3 Murders, 3 Nights"	Helium (1998)	4:22
3.	"Blue Monochrome"	Helium (1998)	4:16
4.	"Electro"	Helium (1998)	0:31
5.	"Chromed"	Helium (1998)	4:31
6.	"Burnout"	Helium (1998)	4:21
7.	"Forget You" (Dr.Speedlove mix)		5:10
8.	"3D"	Helium (1998)	4:17
9.	"Overlorded"	Helium (1998)	4:59
10.	"Sleeper"	0.01 (1996)	3:52
11.	"Anti-Cool"	0.01 (1996)	4:10
12.	"Sensual Eventual"	Helium (1998)	4:45
13.	"Bite Down"	0.01 (1996)	5:14
14.	"SPR2"		1:30
15.	"Breathe"	0.01 (1996)	4:25
16.	"AROM"	Helium (1998)	1:56
17.	"Tokyo"	Helium (1998)	5:04

== Personnel ==
Adapted from the Regurgitator liner notes.

- Bryan Barton – electric guitar, programming, vocals, musical arrangement, cover art, design
- Charles Levi – bass guitar
- Jared Louche – vocals, musical arrangement
- Eric Powell – electric guitar, programming, vocals, musical arrangement

== Release history ==
Region	Date	Label	Format	Catalog
United States	2001	Invisible	CD	INV 205
