= Songs From the Hydrogen Bar: A Tribute to Chemlab =

Studio album of cover songs by Various artists
- Released: September 27, 2007
- Genre: Industrial rock
- Length: 76:44
- Label: MOMT

Songs From the Hydrogen Bar: A Tribute to Chemlab (or Stapled and Sutured) is a tribute album and various artists compilation album released on September 27, 2007 released by MOMT. The album was named after Chemlab's website and 1993 debut album Burn Out at the Hydrogen Bar, released by Fifth Colvmn Records.

== Reception ==
Robert Ryttman at Zero Magazine credited Songs From the Hydrogen Bar: A Tribute to Chemlab with being partially successful but noted he would prefer to listen directly to the source.

== Track listing ==
No.	Title	Artist	Length
1.	"Chemical Halo" (Bruised Regeneration Suture)	Flesh Field	3:18
2.	"Suicide Jag"	Cyanotic	5:04
3.	"21st Century" (Head Like a Whore Mix)	UCNX	5:38
4.	"Neurozone"	16volt	5:26
5.	"Exile on Mainline"	Hindu Pez	4:31
6.	"Chemical Halo"	Infocollapse	4:31
7.	"Derailer"	Fetish Project	4:50
8.	"Codeine, Glue & You" (White Line Fever Mix)	K-Nitrate	4:46
9.	"Jesus Christ Porno Star"	Insight 23	6:49
10.	"Neurozone"	Typozorg	5:52
11.	"Codeine, Glue & You"	Cross Contamination	4:22
12.	"Megahurts"	Upon Eventual Collapse	5:15
13.	"Pyromance"	Amorphite	3:40
14.	"Blunt Force Trauma"	Idiot Stare	4:20
15.	"Pink"	The Vinegar Works	7:10
16.	"Suture"	D.Gray	1:12

== Personnel ==
Adapted from the Songs From the Hydrogen Bar: A Tribute to Chemlab liner notes.

== Release history ==
Region	Date	Label	Format	Catalog
United States	2007	MOMT	CD, DL	MOMTCD010
