= Insight 23 =

American musical group

- Origin: Los Angeles, California, United States
- Genres: Industrial rock
- Years active: 1994–1997
- Label: Fifth Colvmn
- Past members: Blayne Alexander; Brittain Alexander; John Whatley
- Website: insight23.com

Insight 23 were an American electro-industrial group based in Los Angeles, California, United States. The original incarnation consisted of vocalist Blayne Alexander, Brittain Alexander, and John Whatley. The band released the studio album Obsess in 1994 for Perception Rek.

== History ==
Insight 23 was formed in Los Angeles by vocalist Blayne Alexander, Brittain Alexander, and John Whatley. In 1994, the band debuted with two cassette releases for Perception Rek: the single Disease/The Hurt Hate Lies and full-length album Obsess. The following year Insight 23 sent a promotional package of demos to Fifth Colvmn Records, who had just reported securing a distribution deal with Caroline Records, and the label reissued their debut album on compact disc. A video was filed for the album's titletrack by Alexander's boss, who was credited as MarkB and at that time employed as a creative director for a company. The band filmed two more videos for "Disease" and "Two More Reasons". In 1996 a gun was pulled on vocalist Blayne Alexander at The Unicorn in Milwaukee which caused the band to cancel several tour dates.

The band recorded new material in the form of the songs "Backwash" and "EnemyMind" and released it respectively on 1995's Forced Cranial Removal and 1996's World War Underground by Fifth Colvmn Records. The band also produced a cover version of Run–D.M.C.'s "Can You Rock It Like This" for the Re-Constriction Records compilation Operation Beatbox in 1996. In 1997 the band released "Disease", originally from their debut, on the various artist compilations Digital Wings 1 and Industrial War: The Agony and the Ecstasy of Industrial Music. Blayne Alexander and Brittain Alexander joined Idiot Stare in 2001. After a ten year hiatus from releasing music the band recorded a cover of Chemlab's "Jesus Christ Porno Star" for Songs From the Hydrogen Bar: A Tribute to Chemlab in 2007.

== Discography ==
Studio albums

- Obsess (1994, Perception Rek)

Compilation appearances

- Forced Cranial Removal (1995, Fifth Colvmn)
- Operation Beatbox (1996, Re-Constriction/Cargo)
- World War Underground (1996, Fifth Colvmn)
- Digital Wings 1 (1997, The Cyberden)
- Industrial War: The Agony and the Ecstasy of Industrial Music (1997, Shanachie)
- Songs From the Hydrogen Bar: A Tribute to Chemlab (2007, MOMT)
