= FullBlackHabit =

Studio album by 16volt
- Released: June 19, 2007
- Recorded: 2006
- Studio: Various: Marinet; (Los Angeles, CA); Murder Creek; (Portland, OR)
- Genre: Industrial rock
- Length: 48:18
- Label: Metropolis
- Producer: Eric Powell

16volt chronology
The Best of Sixteen Volt (2005)	FullBlackHabit (2007)	American Porn Songs (2009)

FullBlackHabit is the fifth studio album by 16volt, released on June 19, 2007, by Metropolis Records. The album's title was directly inspired by the 1987 film FullMetalJacket. Early versions of the song "Suffering You" previously debuted on the soundtrack to the 2003 PlayStation 2 video game Primal and later appeared the band's greatest hits album in 2005.

== Reception ==
Fabryka awarded the FullBlackHabit four out of four stars and said "Eric Powell reconned up with his music fascinations and ideas, to find a golden mean what finally led him to create an album with a variety of songs, modern and fresh but still recognized as a 16volt's venture." Kristofer Upjohn of Raves gave the album four out of five stars and said "the textures and rhythms are catchy and the melodic input is finely performed as well."

== Track listing ==
All tracks are written by Eric Powell, except "Suffering You" co-written with John DeSalvo and Mike Peoples and "You Run" and "Therapy" co-written with Scott Robison.

No.	Title	Length
1.	"I'm Just a Mess"	3:47
2.	"Come for You"	3:24
3.	"Cables & Wires"	3:29
4.	"Suffering You"	3:08
5.	"And You Are All Alone Again"	3:55
6.	"The End of It All"	4:29
7.	"Afterglow"	4:32
8.	"Feel It Through"	2:55
9.	"The Defect People"	2:58
10.	"The Error"	3:05
11.	"You Run"	4:14
12.	"Whisper Cure"	4:16
13.	"Therapy"	4:09

== Personnel ==
Adapted from the FullBlackHabit liner notes.

16volt

- Eric Powell – lead vocals, guitar, programming, keyboards, production, engineering, recording, mixing, cover art

Addition performers

- Jason Bazinet – additional percussion (1–3, 5–11, 13)
- Paul Raven – bass guitar (1, 2, 8, 10, 11)
- Scott Robison – additional arrangements (12)
- Bill Sarver (as Billdeaux) – additional programming (12)
- Kraig Tyler – bass guitar (4, 13), additional guitar (6, 12), guitars (4), additional bass guitar (12)
- Steve White (as Steve Pig) – additional guitars (1, 2, 9–11, 13)

Production and design

- Ryan Foster – mastering

== Release history ==
Region	Date	Label	Format	Catalog
United States	2007	Metropolis	CD	MET 493
Russia	2008	Soyuz Music	CD	
United States	2018	Metropolis	DL	MET 493
