= The Remix Wars: Strike 3 – 16 Volt vs. Hate Dept =

Remix album by 16volt and Hate Dept.
- Released: April 14, 1997
- Recorded: 1996
- Genre: Industrial metal, industrial rock
- Length: 28:16
- Label: 21st Circuitry
- Producer: 16volt, Hate Dept.

16volt chronology
LetDownCrush (1996)	The Remix Wars: Strike 3 – 16 Volt vs. Hate Dept (1997)	SuperCoolNothing (1998)

Hate Dept. chronology
Omnipresent (1996)	The Remix Wars: Strike 3 (1997)	Technical Difficulties (1999)

The Remix Wars chronology
The Remix Wars: Strike 2 (1996)	The Remix Wars: Strike 3 (1997)	The Remix Wars: Strike 4 (1999)

The Remix Wars: Strike 3 – 16volt vs. Hate Dept. is the third remix album released by 21st Circuitry Records. It features three songs by each artist, remixed by the other artist. "Stiched" was originally recorded for 16 Volt's second album Skin. "Dreams of Light" and "Motorskill" were both originally recorded for their first album Wisdom. All three songs by the Hate Dept. ("Defensive", "Start Digging" and "Drive:a") came from their debut album meat.your.maker.

== Reception ==
Black Monday criticized the misdirection of the remixes and said "I'd have to say that this release is a bit disappointing, but the tracks that are good are real nice to have."

== Track listing ==
16 Volt remixed by Hate Dept.
No.	Title	Length
1.	"Stitched" (Face-Rip)	3:44
2.	"Dreams of Light" (Nightmare)	4:57
3.	"Motorskill" (Quad)	4:49

Hate Dept. remixed by 16 Volt
No.	Title	Length
4.	"Defensive" (Loose and Trash Mix)	3:52
5.	"Start Digging" (The Giver/The Taker)	5:35
6.	"Drive:a" (Netmix)	5:19

== Release history ==
Region	Date	Label	Format	Catalog
Germany	1996	21st Circuitry	CD	21C.CD16
United States	1997	Off Beat	CD	SPV 068-43542
Canada	2016	Artoffact	LP	AOF266
