= Tape Decay =

Compilation album by Chemlab
- Released: September 18, 2019
- Genre: Industrial rock
- Length: 70:49
- Label: Armalyte Industries

Chemlab chronology
Rock Whore vs. Dance Floor (2006)	Tape Decay (2019)

Tape Decay is a compilation album by Chemlab, released on September 18, 2019 by Armalyte Industries. It contains demo versions of songs from 10 Ton Pressure, Burn Out at the Hydrogen Bar and East Side Militia combined with three previously unreleased tracks from upcoming albums and an unreleased suture titled "Burnout on the East Side".

== Track listing ==
No.	Title	Lyrics	Music	Artist(s)	Length
1.	"Chemical Halo"	Jared Louche	Dylan Thomas More	Chemlab	5:46
2.	"Neurozone"	Jared Louche	Dylan Thomas More	Chemlab	5:07
3.	"Black Station"	Jared Louche	Dylan Thomas More	Chemlab	7:51
4.	"I Still Bleed"	Jared Louche	Dylan Thomas More	Chemlab	4:45
5.	"Exile on Mainline" (Renegade Mix)	Jared Louche	Dylan Thomas More, William Tucker	Chemlab	5:15
6.	"Electric Molecular"	Jared Louche	Dylan Thomas More, William Tucker	Chemlab	3:57
7.	"Doom Head"	Jared Louche	Ether of Souls	Ether of Souls	3:31
8.	"Skin Job"	Jared Louche	Martin King	Dogtablet	6:00
9.	"Burnout on the East Side"		Dylan Thomas More	Chemlab	4:07
10.	"Throw It All Out"	Jared Louche	Richard Miles, Tom Mugridge	Ultraterrestrials	4:06

== Personnel ==
Adapted from the Tape Decay liner notes.

Chemlab

- Wade Alin – instruments
- Jason Bazinet – instruments
- Phil DiSiena – instruments
- Jared Louche – vocals, instruments
- Marc Plastic – instruments

Production and design

- Julian Seifert – mastering
- Vlad McNeally – design
- Robert "Nix" Nixon – cover art, illustrations
- Miguel Torres – mastering

== Release history ==
Date	Region	Label	Format	Catalog
2019	United States	Armalyte Industries	CD	ARMCD067
