= Suture (album) =

Compilation album by Chemlab
- Released: January 23, 2001
- Studio: Various: Chicago Trax Recording Studio; (Chicago, IL); Floating Rib Studios
- Genre: Industrial rock
- Length: 70:49
- Label: Invisible
- Producer: Hilary Bercovici; Jeff "Critter" Newell; Jared Louche; Dylan Thomas Moore

Chemlab chronology
East Side Militia (1996)	Suture (2001)	The Machine Age (EP) (2003)

Suture is a compilation album by Chemlab, released on January 23, 2001, by Invisible Records. It is an expanded reissue of Magnetic Field Remixes (itself containing the complete contents of the EP Ten Ton Pressure), with remixes from the "Electric Molecular" and "Exile on Mainline" singles and one previously unreleased track named "Static Haze".

== Reception ==
Professional ratings
Review scores
Source	Rating
Allmusic	3/5 stars

Rick Anderson of allmusic gave Suture three out of five stars and said "highly recommended to fans of funky industrialism." A critic for Ink 19 compared the collection favorably to Nitzer Ebb and praised the album for being "a fine slice of spiteful agit-dance, very familiar in a sense." Lollipop Magazine deemed the material from 10 Ton Pressure to be the highlight of the compilation, saying "the three EP tracks are old school industrial, and worth a few spins, and for those into remixes of the band’s more popular/less interesting material, there're plenty of takes on a few of them here."

== Track listing ==
All tracks are written by Chemlab.

No.	Title	From album (date)	Length
1.	"Chemical Halo" (Bruised Regeneration Mix)	Magnetic Field Remixes (1994)	5:46
2.	"21st Century" (Rough Sex Demo)	Magnetic Field Remixes (1994)	5:07
3.	"Chemical Halo" (Drag-Strip Download)	Magnetic Field Remixes (1994)	7:51
4.	"Codeine, Glue and You" (Scorched Remix)	Magnetic Field Remixes (1994)	4:45
5.	"Filament"	10 Ton Pressure (1990)	5:15
6.	"I Still Bleed"	10 Ton Pressure (1990)	3:57
7.	"Blunt Force Trauma"	10 Ton Pressure (1990)	3:31
8.	"Black Radio (In the Neon Blur)"	10 Ton Pressure (1990)	6:00
9.	"Electric Molecular" (Death Before Taxes Mix)	"Electric Molecular" (1996)	4:07
10.	"Electric Molecular" (Instrumental No Taxes Mix)	"Electric Molecular" (1996)	4:06
11.	"Electric Molecular" (Malignant Mix)	"Electric Molecular" (1996)	4:52
12.	"Exile on Mainline" (Extended Dance)	"Exile on Mainline" (1996)	4:57
13.	"Exile on Mainline" (Radio)	"Exile on Mainline" (1996)	3:13
14.	"Jesus Christ Porno Star" (Lick-a-Licious Mix)		6:16
15.	"Static Haze (Lost Suture)"		1:05

== Personnel ==
Adapted from the Suture liner notes.

Chemlab

- Jared Louche – lead vocals, production, arrangements, design, remix (1, 2, 4, 12–14)
- Dylan Thomas More – programming, arrangements, remix (1, 2, 4, 12–14)

Additional performers

- Black Metal Box – remix (11)
- John DeSalvo – drums
- Sascha Konietzko – remix (9, 10)
- Geno Lenardo – EBow and guitar (1–4)
- Krayge Tyler – guitar (1, 4)

Production and design

- Hilary Bercovici – production (5–8)
- Jeff "Critter" Newell – production and remix (1, 2, 4, 12–14)
- Maja Prausnitz – design
- Claudine Schafer-Legrand – photography

== Release history ==
Date	Region	Label	Format	Catalog
2001	United States	Invisible	CD	INV 161
