= Hardcore Vanilla =

Studio album by H3llb3nt
- Released: January 13, 2001
- Recorded: 2000
- Studio: Various: Black Socket, London; (London, UK); Crush Studios; (Hell, CA)
- Genre: Electro-industrial
- Length: 41:13
- Label: Invisible
- Producers: Martin Atkins, H3llb3nt

H3llb3nt chronology
| Helium (1998) | Hardcore Vanilla (2001) | Regurgitator (2001) |

Professional ratings
Review scores
| Source | Rating |
|---|---|
| AllMusic | 2.5/5 stars |

Hardcore Vanilla is the third studio album by the industrial band H3llb3nt. It was released in 2001 on Invisible Records.

== Track listing ==
All tracks are written by H3llb3nt, except "Rubber Girls With Knives" by Raymond Watts.

| No. | Title | Length |
|---|---|---|
| 1. | "Repeat Patterns" | 0:12 |
| 2. | "Heliophobic" | 3:47 |
| 3. | "Forget You" | 4:30 |
| 4. | "Switching Off" | 4:01 |
| 5. | "Spread the Virus" | 1:07 |
| 6. | "Jet Boy Machine" | 3:33 |
| 7. | "Time" | 4:44 |
| 8. | "Atariteenagefuck" | 1:08 |
| 9. | "Rubber Girls With Knives" (writer: Raymond Watts) | 6:04 |
| 10. | "Modulus" | 4:48 |
| 11. | "Blo" | 6:32 |
| 12. | "Airbust" | 0:47 |

== Personnel ==
Adapted from the Hardcore Vanilla liner notes.

H3llb3nt

- Bryan Barton – electric guitar, programming, vocals, musical arrangement, cover art, design
- Charles Levi – bass guitar
- Jared Louche – vocals, musical arrangement
- Eric Powell – electric guitar, programming, vocals, musical arrangement

Additional musicians

- Martin Atkins – drums, musical arrangement, production, engineering, mastering
- Steve Aylett – vocals (2)
- Meg Lee Chin – vocals
- John DeSalvo – loops
- Lee Fraser – loops
- Jason McNinch – electric guitar
- Julie Plante – vocals (10)
- Raymond Watts – vocals and programming (9)
- Anna Wildsmith – vocals (11)

Production and design

- Chris Greene – mastering
- H3llb3nt – production
- Victoria Straub – photography

== Release history ==
| Region | Date | Label | Format | Catalog |
|---|---|---|---|---|
| United States | 2001 | Invisible | CD | INV 202 |
