= 0.01 =

0.01 may refer to:

- Hundredth
- 0.01 (album), the debut album by H3llb3nt

== See also ==
- Orders of magnitude (numbers)#10−2
