= Obsess (album) =

Studio album by Insight 23
- Released: 1994
- Studio: PsychoWhoreRoom
- Genre: Industrial rock
- Label: Perception Rek
- Producer: Chad Bishop

Singles from Obsess
- 1. "Disease/The Hurt Hate Lies" Released: 1994

Alternative cover
- 1995 reissue

Obsess is the debut studio album of Insight 23, released on November 1, 1994 by Fifth Colvmn Records. The album was re-released on May 23, 1995 by Fifth Colvmn Records with an expanded track listing.

== Music ==
The reissue of Obsess is a multimedia CD-ROM that can be accessed using a computer and plays as white noise on some CD players. The song "Disease" was released on the 1997 various artist compilations Digital Wings 1 and Industrial War: The Agony and the Ecstasy of Industrial Music.

== Reception ==
Option commended and Obsess said that Insight 23 "represent the new school of electro-rock" Sonic Boom agreed with the comparison for the "Insight 23 has definitely gone out of its way to create a sound almost totally devoid on influences or comparisons" and credited them with being "one of the seemingly few bands who can mix guitars and electronics together and not end up with the guitars washing out all the technology used to create the music."

== Track listing ==
All lyrics are written by Blayne Alexander; all music is composed by John Whatley

Side one
No.	Title	Length
1.	"The Hurt Hate Lies"
2.	"Disease"
3.	"Dying in the Alley"
4.	"Two More Reasons"

Side one
No.	Title	Length
1.	"If..."
2.	"Unforgiven"
3.	"Disease" (Rave Disaster Mix)
4.	"Obsess"

1995 track listing
No.	Title	Length
1.	"Promise"	0:28
2.	"Disease"	4:59
3.	"Dying in the Alley"	4:53
4.	"Two More Reasons"	3:47
5.	"Backwash"	5:35
6.	"If..."	1:12
7.	"Unforgiven"	5:33
8.	"Hurt Hate Lies"	3:42
9.	"Thinner"	4:49
10.	"Digital Blood"	7:13
11.	"Obsess"	3:47

== Personnel ==
Adapted from the Obsess liner notes.

Insight 23

- Blayne Alexander – vocals, recording and mixing (2, 11)
- Brittain Alexander – percussion, recording and mixing (2, 11)
- John Whatley – guitar, sampler, programming, recording and mixing (2, 11)

Production and design

- Chad Bishop – production, mixing
- Keith Banks – mastering
- Matt Chidgey – engineering, recording and mixing (3–10, 12), additional guitar (10)
- MarkB – cover art, illustrations, design
- Zalman Fishman – executive-production

== Release history ==
Region	Date	Label	Format	Catalog
United States	1994	Perception Rek	CS	PRDM 02
United States	1995	Fifth Colvmn	CD	9868-63191
