= Gravy (band) =

After That it's All Gravy
- Origin: New York City, New York, United States
- Genres: Experimental
- Years active: 1996
- Labels: Fused Coil
- Past members: Julie Cafritz; Joey Defilipps; Kim Rancourt

Gravy was an American band out of New York City. The musicians Julie Cafritz of Pussy Galore, Joey Defilipps of When People Were Shorter and Lived Near the Water and Kim Rancourt of To Live and Shave in L.A. In 1996, the band released the EP After That It's All Gravy on Fused Coil.

== History ==
Gravy was founded in 1994 out of New York City by Julie Cafritz, Joey Defilipps and Kim Rancourt. In August 1996 the band released their debut EP titled After That It's All Gravy. The album was produced with the assistance of Don Fleming of noise rock group B.A.L.L. and vocalist Jared Louche of industrial rock group Chemlab.

== Discography ==
Expanded plays

- After That It's All Gravy (1996, Fused Coil)
