= Cover girl (disambiguation) =

A cover girl is a woman whose photograph features on the front cover of a magazine.

Cover girl may also refer to:

== Film and television ==
- Cover Girl (film), a 1944 film starring Rita Hayworth and Gene Kelly
- Cover Girl (1964 film), an Italian film of 1964
- Cover Girl (TV series), a Canadian French-language television sitcom
- Covergirl (film), a 1984 Canadian drama film
- Cover Girls (film), a 1977 American TV film
- "Cover Girl" an episode of Sex and the City
- "Cover Girls", a season 1 episode of The Loud House

== Music ==
- The Cover Girls, an American music group
- Cover Girl (singer), a singer who released "We Found Love"
- Cover Girl (Shawn Colvin album), 1994
- Covergirl (Groove Coverage album), 2002
- Covergirl (Jared Louche and The Aliens album), 1999
- "Cover Girl" (New Kids on the Block song), 1989
- "Cover Girl", a song by RuPaul from the 2009 album Champion
- "Cover Girl", a song by Big Time Rush from the 2011 album Elevate
- "Cover Girls" a 2017 song by Hitimpulse
- "Cover Girls" a 2008 song by Quanteisha

== Other uses ==
- Cover Girl (G.I. Joe), a fictional character in the G.I. Joe universe
- CoverGirl, a brand of makeup
