= Covergirl (Jared Louche and The Aliens album) =

Studio album of cover songs by Jared Louche and The Aliens
- Released: September 28, 1999
- Recorded: Spring 1999
- Studios: Waiting Room (London, UK)
- Genres: Alternative rock, industrial rock
- Length: 42:45
- Label: Invisible
- Producers: Martin Atkins; Dave Baker; J. F. Coleman; Chris Greene; Martin King; Jared Louche; Jason McNinch

Covergirl is a cover album and the debut studio album of Jared Louche and The Aliens, released on September 28, 1999 by Invisible Records. It contains cover versions of some of Louche's favorite musical acts and influences.

== Reception ==
Professional ratings
Review scores
Source	Rating
AllMusic	3/5 stars

Tom Schulte of AllMusic credits the lounge and jazz influenced material, such as Chemlab's "Suicide Jag" and Frank Sinatra's "Summer Wind", as being the high point of the album. Alex Steininger of In Music We Trust called the album a "a powerful, seductive breath of life that will allow you to never look at the originals in the same light again." In writing for Ink 19, critic Matthew Moyer commended Jared Louche for expanding variety in his musical craft while remaining true to his aesthetic. Despite criticizing some song choices as being lackluster, Chris Best of Lollipop Magazine was mostly positive in his review and said "these selections are reinterpretations that are done well enough to not invoke the originals."

== Track listing ==
No.	Title	Writer(s)	Length
1.	"In Every Dream Home a Heartache" (Roxy Music cover)	Bryan Ferry	5:18
2.	"Sister Midnight" (Iggy Pop cover)	Carlos Alomar, David Bowie, Iggy Pop	4:34
3.	"Sexy Boy" (Air cover)	Jean-Benoît Dunckel, Nicolas Godin	4:57
4.	"Famous Blue Raincoat (suture)" (Leonard Cohen cover)	Leonard Cohen	3:31
5.	"Suicide Jag" (Chemlab cover)	Mark Kermanj, Jared Louche, Dylan Thomas More	5:12
6.	"Poptones" (Public Image Ltd. cover)	Keith Levene, John Lydon	3:31
7.	"7 and 7 Is... (suture)" (Love cover)	Arthur Lee	1:20
8.	"Search and Destroy" (Iggy and the Stooges cover)	Iggy Pop, James Williamson	4:20
9.	"Summer Wind" (Frank Sinatra cover)	Hans Bradtke, Heinz Meier, Johnny Mercer	4:36
10.	"Sexy Boy (Outro suture)" (Air cover)	Jean-Benoît Dunckel, Nicolas Godin	5:27

== Personnel ==
Adapted from the Covergirl liner notes.

Musicians

- Chris Greene – instruments, programming (2–8, 10), production (2, 4, 5–8, 10)
- Jared Louche – lead vocals, orchestration, conductor, production, programming (2–8, 10)

Additional performers

- DJ Abel (as Kick the Cat) – instruments (5, 8)
- Martin Atkins – programming and production (3, 4, 7, 8)
- Dave Baker – acoustic guitar and production (4)
- J. F. Coleman – programming and production (1)
- Martin King – programming and production (9)
- Bradley McCarty – drums (7)
- Jason McNinch – guitar (2, 3, 7, 8, 10), production (2)
- Pedro Miras (as Kick the Cat) – instruments (5, 8)
- Patrick Skinner – bass guitar (10)
- Alberto Tapia (as Kick the Cat) – instruments (5, 8)

Production and design

- Jill Birschbach – photography
- Marc Paez – design
- Maja Prausnitz – design

== Release history ==
Region	Date	Label	Format	Catalog
1999	United States	Invisible	CD	INV 151
