= SuperCoolNothing v2.0 =

Compilation album by 16volt
- Released: July 1, 2002
- Recorded: 1998
- Studio: Various: Mad Bus Studios; (Burbank, CA); Mad Dog Studios; (Burbank, CA); Scream Studios; (Studio City, Los Angeles, CA)
- Genre: Industrial metal; industrial rock
- Length: 72:46
- Label: Dark City Music
- Producer: Joseph Bishara; Bill Kennedy; Mike Peoples; Eric Powell

16volt chronology
Demography (2000)	SuperCoolNothing v2.0 (2002)	The Best of Sixteen Volt (2005)

SuperCoolNothing v2.0 is a compilation album by 16volt, released on July 1, 2002 by Dark City Music. The album comes with a bonus disk of remixes and demos. Several tracks of the album are featured in the video game Primal. Two-thousand copies of the album were re-pressed by Dark City Music with new cover art and the first 100 copies signed by the band.

== Reception ==
Professional ratings
Review scores
Source	Rating
AllMusic	4/5 stars

Don Kline of AllMusic gave SuperCoolNothing v2.0 four out of five stars and said "with its gut-wrenching lyrics, incessant percussion, and grinding guitars, it's unfortunate that Super Cool Nothing remains one of the more largely unnoticed industrial releases of the late '90s." IGN credited the second disc as being better than the first and claimed "industrial/goth exuberance aside, there were a few tracks on supercoolnothing that burrowed themselves into my sonic consciousness."

== Track listing ==
All tracks are written by Mike Peoples and Eric Powell.

Disc one
No.	Title	Length
1.	"I Fail Truth"	3:26
2.	"Everyday Everything"	3:19
3.	"Don't Pray"	4:36
4.	"Keep Sleeping"	3:15
5.	"Moutheater"	5:31
6.	"Happy Pill"	4:13
7.	"The Enemy"	3:54
8.	"Machine Kit"	3:05
9.	"Low"	4:31
10.	"And I Go"	4:27
11.	"Dead Weight"	3:00
12.	"At the End"	5:55

Disc two
No.	Title	Remixer(s)	Length
1.	"At the End" (Cub Mix)	Paige Haley	4:27
2.	"Happy Pill" (Durtee Mix)	Eric Powell, Krayge Tyler	3:50
3.	"Keep Sleeping" (Radio Edit)	Eric Powell, Krayge Tyler	2:51
4.	"Low" (Filtered Mix)	Geno Lenardo	4:46
5.	"Suffering You" (Demo)		3:19
6.	"Plastic Blue" (Demo)		4:23

== Personnel ==
Adapted from the SuperCoolNothing v2.0 liner notes.

16volt

- Mike Peoples – guitar, bass guitar, production
- Eric Powell – lead vocals, guitar, programming, engineering, production

Addition performers

- Joseph Bishara – programming, production, engineering
- Krayge Tyler – guitar
- Chris Vrenna – drums

Production and design

- Michael Bodine – cover art, design
- Andrew Garver – mastering
- Dave Hancock – engineering
- Bill Kennedy – production, engineering, mixing
- Rafael Serrano – engineering
- Steve Tushar – engineering

== Release history ==
Region	Date	Label	Format	Catalog
United States	2000	Dark City Music	CD	DCMCD001
United States	2009		DL	
