= Disease (disambiguation) =

A disease is an abnormal condition that affects the body of an organism.

Disease or The Disease may also refer to:

- Disease (Beartooth album) or the title song, 2018
- Disease (G.G.F.H. album) or the title song, 1993
- The Disease EP or the title song, by the Eyes of a Traitor, 2011
- "Disease" (Matchbox Twenty song), 2002
- "Disease" (Lady Gaga song), 2024
- "Disease", a song by Hollywood Undead from Day of the Dead, 2015
- "Disease", a song by Insight 23 from Obsess, 1995
- "Dis-ease", a song by BTS from Be, 2020
- "The Disease", a song by Heaven Shall Burn from Iconoclast (Part 1: The Final Resistance), 2008
- "The Disease", an episode of Star Trek: Voyager

== See also ==
- List of diseases
