= Rock Whore vs. Dance Floor =

Remix album by Chemlab
- Released: March 14, 2006
- Genre: Industrial rock
- Length: 79:57
- Label: Invisible/Underground, Inc.

Chemlab chronology
| Oxidizer (2006) | Rock Whore vs. Dance Floor (2006) | Tape Decay (2019) |

Rock Whore vs. Dance Floor is a remix album by Chemlab, released on March 14, 2006, by Invisible Records and Underground, Inc.

== Track listing ==
All tracks are written by Chemlab.

| No. | Title | Remixer(s) | Length |
|---|---|---|---|
| 1. | "Monkey God" (Monkey Scratch Remix) | Needleye | 5:46 |
| 2. | "Atomic Automatic" (Our Glitch Mode Squad Is Dangerous Mix) | Cyanotic | 5:07 |
| 3. | "Black Snake" (Gun Remix) | Terrorfakt | 7:51 |
| 4. | "Scornocopia" (Glitchstar Mix) | Christ Analogue | 4:45 |
| 5. | "Binary Nation" (Renegade Mix) | The Aggression | 5:15 |
| 6. | "White Room" (Cash for Oil Remix) | Cubanate | 3:57 |
| 7. | "Scornocopia" (Scorpio Remix) | Die Warzau | 3:31 |
| 8. | "Megahurtz" (Caliopenis vs. Cocktopus Remix) | Adam Grossman | 6:00 |
| 9. | "Binary Nation" (16 Volt Max-Out) | 16volt | 4:07 |
| 10. | "Queen of Despair" (Lay Back and Rock Mix) | .mnpltr. | 4:06 |
| 11. | "Megahurtz" (mindFIELD Aurora Mix) | mindFIELD | 4:52 |
| 12. | "Force Quit" (Lickthevelvetpouch) | Ipecac Loop | 4:57 |
| 13. | "Scornocopia" (London Sin-phony Orgasmus Mix) | Dave Suycott | 3:13 |
| 14. | "Binary Nation" (Demento Mix) | Kill Memory Crash | 3:13 |
| 15. | "White Room" (Haloblackattack Remix) | haloblack | 3:13 |
| 16. | "Black Snake" (TenderBender Mix) | Meat Curtain | 3:13 |
| 17. | "The Moon" (Suture Remix) | Deadliner | 3:13 |

== Personnel ==
Adapted from the Rock Whore vs. Dance Floor liner notes.

Chemlab

- F.J. DeSanto – instruments
- Jamie Duffy – instruments
- Jared Louche – vocals, instruments
- Greg Lucas – instruments
- Jason Novak – instruments

Additional performers

- Duncan Wilkinson – additional programming (1)

Production and design

- Martin Atkins – mastering
- Michael Doyle – design
- Miguel Torres – mastering

== Release history ==
| Date | Region | Label | Format | Catalog |
|---|---|---|---|---|
| 2006 | United States | Invisible/Underground, Inc. | CD | UIN1119 |
