= Skinjob =

Skinjob(s) or skin job(s) may refer to:

== Fiction ==
- Replicant, or "skin-job", in the Blade Runner franchise
- Humanoid Cylons, or "skinjobs", in the Battlestar Galactica franchise

== Music ==
- Skinjobs, a Canadian queercore band
- Skinjob, a 1990 album by False Virgins featuring David Aaron Clark
- "Skin Job", a 1985 song by Live Skull from Bringing Home the Bait
- "Skin Job", a 2000 song by Primitive Radio Gods from White Hot Peach
- "Skin Job", a 2019 song by Chemlab from Tape Decay

== See also ==
- Haujobb, a German band named for the German version of "skinjob" from Blade Runner
