= After That It's All Gravy =

EP by Gravy
- Released: August 27, 1996
- Studio: Waterworks (New York City, New York)
- Genre: Experimental
- Length: 20:06
- Label: Fused Coil

After That It's All Gravy is an EP by Gravy, released on August 27, 1996 by Fused Coil. the album was executive-produced by Jared Louche of Chemlab.

== Reception ==
Aiding & Abetting called the music as lacking and the album "compelling, but not necessarily for the right reasons." babysue also criticized the music for being impenetrably experimental, stating that "the overall effect is that you've left a television set on in the other room, and you can't really get a grip on what program is on."

== Track listing ==
All tracks are written by Julie Cafritz, Joey Defilipps and Kim Rancourt

No.	Title	Length
2.	"#13"	3:41
3.	"#14"	3:14
4.	"#15"	2:11
5.	"#16"	2:03
6.	"#2"	3:38
7.	"#7"	3:02
8.	"..."	0:50
9.	"..."	0:37
10.	"..."	0:37
11.	"..."	0:34
12.	"..."	0:37
13.	"..."	0:28
14.	"..."	0:20
15.	"..."	0:22
16.	"#11"	0:19
17.	"..."	0:13
18.	"..."	0:32
19.	"..."	0:29
20.	"..."	0:29
21.	"..."	0:20
22.	"..."	0:11
23.	"..."	0:12
24.	"#12"	0:55
25.	"..."	0:52
26.	"..."	0:43
27.	"..."	0:37
28.	"..."	0:42
29.	"..."	0:24
30.	"..."	0:23
31.	"#43"	0:33

== Personnel ==
Adapted from the liner notes of After That It's All Gravy.

Gravy

- Julie Cafritz – instruments
- Joey Defilipps – instruments
- Kim Rancourt – instruments, photography, design

Production and design

- Greg Calbi – mastering
- Don Fleming – producer
- Jared Hendrickson – executive-producer
- Mark Ohe – photography, design
- Tom Smith – mixing
- Jim Waters – engineering

== Release history ==
Region	Date	Label	Format	Catalog
1996	United States	Fused Coil	CD	9868-63234
