= Talking Heads '77 (Peach of Immortality album) =

Studio album by Peach of Immortality
- Released: 1985
- Recorded: November 1984 – January 1985
- Studio: Various: 9:30; (Washington, D.C.); D.C. Space; (Chicago, Illinois); Hardart Gallery; (Chicago, Illinois)
- Genre: Industrial rock
- Length: 68:55
- Label: Adult Contemporary
- Producer: Tom Smith

Peach of Immortality chronology
Need (Thee)! (1984)	Talking Heads '77 (1985)	"Jehovah" My Black Ass-R.E.M. Is Air Supply! (1986)

Talking Heads '77 is the second studio album by Peach of Immortality, released in 1985 by Adult Contemporary Recordings.

== Reception ==
Professional ratings
Review scores
Source	Rating
AllMusic	2/5 stars

AllMusic gave Talking Heads '77 a rating of two out of five stars and said "the confusingly-titled Talking Heads '77 is actually the first record from the sonic collage artists Peach of Immortality" (referring to the Talking Heads album Talking Heads: 77).

== Track listing ==
Side one
No.	Title	Length
1.	"2 December 84"	7:09
2.	"15 December 84"	12:17
3.	"20 December 84"	14:20

Side one
No.	Title	Length
1.	"2 December 84"	6:35
2.	"18 January 85"	17:51
3.	"24 January 85"	15:58

== Personnel ==
Adapted from the Talking Heads '77 liner notes.

Peach of Immortality

- David Gamble – instruments
- Jared Louche (as Jared Hendrickson) – guitar
- Rogelio Maxwell – cello
- Tom Smith – tape, producer

Production and design

- Tom Coyne – mastering
- Don Fleming – engineering, mixing, photography, recording (6)
- Joe Kennedy – mixing
- Marlene Weisman Studio – design

== Release history ==
Region	Date	Label	Format	Catalog
United States	1985	Adult Contemporary	LP	ACR003
United States	1995	Fused Coil	CD	9868-63219
