= Beating Dead Horses =

Studio album by 16volt
- Released: May 10, 2011
- Studio: Murder Creek (Portland, Oregon)
- Genre: Industrial rock; alternative metal
- Length: 49:13
- Label: Metropolis
- Producer: Eric Powell

16volt chronology
American Porn Songs: Remixed (2010)	Beating Dead Horses (2011)	The Negative Space (2016)

Beating Dead Horses is the seventh studio album by American industrial rock band 16volt, released on May 5, 2011 by Metropolis Records.

== Reception ==
Brutal Resonance commended the production quality and composition variety of Beating Dead Horses, saying "there are some tracks on this album that vary but most of the tracks follow the same line and it's a pretty straight forward album." COMA Music Magazine called the album the band's best work and said "fans are sure to find Beating Dead Horses to be very enjoyable while new listeners should appreciate the dynamic soundscapes offered by 16Volt." ReGen commended the band for remaining successful composers through their existence and said "with Beating Dead Horses presenting a leaner, meaner, more stripped down and more amped up 16volt, the band stands tall at the forefront of machine rock." Soundsphere Magazine gave the album four out of five stars and said "utilising a blend of the classic band set-up (guitar, drums, vocal and bass) alongside electronic gear (synthesizers, samplers, drum machines and more), this band has come to perfect the skill of mixing of these different sounds that give us the songs we know and love."

== Track listing ==
All tracks are written by Mike Peoples and Eric Powell.

No.	Title	Length
1.	"Beating Dead Horses"	3:46
2.	"The Wasteland That Is Me"	4:03
3.	"Fight or Flight"	2:55
4.	"Burn"	4:16
5.	"You Will All Go Down"	4:14
6.	"Breathing Water"	3:23
7.	"Ghost"	4:25
8.	"We Disintegrate"	3:02
9.	"Dissembler"	3:54
10.	"Sick Sick Sick"	3:34
11.	"The Carrion"	4:22
12.	"Veins"	3:06
13.	"Somewhere New"	4:13

== Personnel ==
Adapted from the Beating Dead Horses liner notes.

16volt

- Mike Peoples – bass guitar, guitars
- Eric Powell – lead vocals, guitars, programming, keyboards, production, recording, design

Additional performers

- Clint Carney – additional programming (3, 9, 13)
- Bill Sarver – additional programming (4, 8, 9, 13)

Production and design

- Josh Asselstine – engineering
- Pyra Draculea – assistant engineering
- Ryan Foster – mastering
- Shaun Thingvold – mixing

== Release history ==
Region	Date	Label	Format	Catalog
United States	2011	Metropolis	CD, DL	MET 706
