= The Dreams That Rot in Your Heart =

Single by 16volt

from the album LetDownCrush
- B-side: "Two Wires Thin"
- Released: July 23, 1996
- Studio: Various: Chicago Trax Recording; (Chicago, IL); Dead Aunt Thelmas; (Portland, OR); The Red Light Room; (Portland, OR); The Litter Box; (Portland, OR)
- Genre: Alternative metal
- Length: 3:38
- Label: Re-Constriction
- Songwriters: Marc LaCorte; Eric Powell
- Producer: Eric Powell

"The Dreams That Rot in Your Heart" is a song by 16volt, released as a single on July 23, 1996 by Re-Constriction Records. It was the only single created to support the band's third album LetDownCrush, which was released in August of that year.

== Reception ==
Black Monday was negatively critical of "The Dreams That Rot in Your Heart" and "Two Wires Thin", saying "the former has these horrid metal parts, and the later is just so ‘big’ and anthemic."

== Track listing ==
No.	Title	Writer(s)	Length
1.	"The Dreams That Rot in Your Heart"	Marc LaCorte, Eric Powell	3:38
2.	"Two Wires Thin"	Eric Powell	3:44
3.	"I Ain't Goin' Out Like That" (Cypress Hill cover)	Louis Freese, Lawrence Muggerud, Richard Todd Ray	4:13

== Personnel ==
Adapted from the liner notes of The Dreams That Rot in Your Heart/Two Wires Thin.

16volt

- Marc LaCorte – guitar, programming
- Eric Powell – lead vocals, programming, guitar, production, engineering, editing

Addition performers

- Bryan Barton – loops (1)

Production and design

- Dave Friedlander – engineering
- Jon Irish – engineering
- Jeff "Critter" Newell – engineering

== Release history ==
Region	Date	Label	Format	Catalog
United States	1996	Re-Constriction	CD	CS REC-022
