= American Porn Songs: Remixed =

Remix album by 16volt
- Released: May 11, 2010
- Genre: Industrial metal; industrial rock
- Length: 66:15
- Label: Metropolis

16volt chronology
American Porn Songs (2009)	American Porn Songs: Remixed (2010)	Beating Dead Horses (2011)

American Porn Songs is a remix album by 16volt, released on May 11, 2010, by Metropolis Records. The album comprises remixed versions of the tracks the appear of the band's 2009 album American Porn Songs.

== Track listing ==
No.	Title	Remixer(s)	Length
1.	"Alkali" (Mirror Mix)	OHN	4:36
2.	"Somebody to Hate" (Hate Hegal Mix)	Cyanotic	3:23
3.	"American Porn Songs" (Skold Mix)	Tim Sköld	4:46
4.	"Become Your None" (Sparrow Mix)	Detective Fingerling	3:52
5.	"Useless People" (Villainous Mix)	The Villainous Vortex	4:24
6.	"Alkali" (LSD Mix)	Left Spine Down	7:17
7.	"American Porn Songs" (Black Mix)	Bryan Black	2:53
8.	"To Hell" (Heroin Jazz Mix)	Bradley Templin	4:16
9.	"Blackbird" (The Gunnery Mix)	Evan Roberts	3:21
10.	"It Turns All Bad" (Drone Mix)	Scott Robinson	4:14
11.	"Become Your None" (Silent Strangers Mix)	Christopher Lambardo	5:50
12.	"Enjoy the Pain" (Novus Anesthetic Mix)	Sindaddy	3:48
13.	"Alkali" (Cold Mix)	Everything Goes Cold	3:29
14.	"Can You Find God?" (Torsion/Solex Mix)	Alexandre Villommet	3:08
15.	"Enjoy the Pain" (Orko-13 Mix)	The Attitude	3:15
16.	"American Porn Song" (Team Cybergeist Mix)	Angel Bartolotta	4:06
17.	"Become Your None" (SMP vs. Stiff Valentine Mix)	Jason Bazinet/Loud Chris Demarcus	3:42
18.	"It Turns All Bad" (Complete Zero Mix)	Unter Null	5:55

== Personnel ==
Adapted from the American Porn Songs: Remixed liner notes.

16volt

- Mike Peoples – guitar, bass guitar
- Eric Powell – lead vocals, guitar, programming, keyboards

Additional performers

- Bryan Barton (as Bryan Black) – remix (7)
- Angel Bartolotta – remix (16)
- Jason Bazinet – remix (17)
- Kaine Delay (as Kaine.D3l4y) – remix (6)
- Chris Demarcus (as Loud Chris Demarcus) – remix (17)
- Jamie Duffy – remix (2)
- Erica Dunham – remix (17)
- Eric Gottesman – remix (13)
- Stacey Hoskins – remix (12)
- Jeremy Inkel – remix (6)
- Anthony Kirksey – remix (15)
- Christopher Lombardo – remix (11)
- Sean Payne – remix (2)
- Ross Miller – remix (5)
- Evan Roberts – remix (9)
- Scott Robison – remix (10)
- Tim Sköld – remix (3)
- Bill Sarver (as Billdeaux) – remix (1)
- Bradley Templin – remix (8)
- Alexandre Villommet – remix (14)

Production and design

- David Din (as Da5id Din) – mastering

== Release history ==
Region	Date	Label	Format	Catalog
United States	2010	Metropolis	CD	MET644
United States	2018	Metropolis	DL	MET644
