= Dead on Arrivals =

EP by 16volt
- Released: October 26, 2017
- Studio: Spider Bayou (Portland, Oregon)
- Genre: Industrial metal; industrial rock
- Length: 25:56
- Label: Murder Creek
- Producer: Eric Powell

16volt chronology
The Negative Space (2016)	Dead on Arrivals (2017)	More of Less (2025)

Dead on Arrivals is a mini-album by 16volt, released on October 26, 2017 by Murder Creek.

== Reception ==
Ilker Yücel of ReGen claimed the album successfully ushers in the band's third era and labeled Dead on Arrivals as "an aggressive return to form for 16volt, providing in six songs more punch than most bands can deliver in a full-length album."

== Track listing ==
All tracks are written by Eric Powell.

No.	Title	Length
1.	"The Lamb"	4:10
2.	"The Favor of Mercy"	3:32
3.	"Pushing Scars"	3:17
4.	"Something Is Coming"	4:47
5.	"For Violence With You"	4:34
6.	"In the Thaw"	5:36

== Personnel ==
Adapted from the Dead on Arrivals liner notes.

16volt

- Eric Bergen – drums
- Erik Gustafson – synthesizer, sampler
- Steve Hickey – guitar, bass guitar, drums, synthesizer, sampler, co-production
- Eric Powell – lead vocals, guitar, drums, synthesizer, sampler, production, mixing, mastering, design

Production and design

- Artemis Sere – cover art, illustrations

== Release history ==
Region	Date	Label	Format	Catalog
United States	2017	Murder Creek	CD	16V10DOA
