= Industrial War: The Agony and the Ecstasy of Industrial Music =

Compilation album by Various artists
- Released: March 18, 1997
- Genre: Electro-industrial
- Length: 66:14
- Label: Shanachie
- Producer: Wagner Bucci

Industrial War: The Agony and the Ecstasy of Industrial Music is a various artists compilation album released on March 3, 1997, released by Shanachie Records.

== Reception ==
Industrial Reviews gave Industrial War: The Agony and the Ecstasy of Industrial Music a rating of two out of five stars and criticized the collection for being indistinctive and unremarkable.

== Track listing ==
No.	Title	Writer(s)	Artist	Length
1.	"Suicide Jag"	Jared Hendrickson; Mark Kermanj; Dylan Thomas More	Chemlab	4:52
2.	"The Son"	Marc Jameson; Pat Toves	Diatribe	3:35
3.	"Desert Storm" (Remix)	Claus Larsen	Klute	4:03
4.	"Egoist (On the Cross)"	Mähne Meenen; Axel Tasler; Jan Wilking	Steril	4:44
5.	"Murderous" (Nitzer Ebb cover)	Bon Harris; Douglas McCarthy	Iron Lung Corp	4:00
6.	"Who Do You Love?"	Kim Løhde Petersen; Michael Hillerup	Birmingham 6	4:50
7.	"Tainted Love" (Soft Cell cover)	Ed Cobb	Deathline International	4:01
8.	"Asphole" (Sick Asp Fuck/Full Gimball/No. 1/Club Mix)	Martin Atkins; Charles Levi; Jim Marcus; Kevin Ogilvie	Pigface vs. Evil Mothers	5:04
9.	"Dead Inside"	Blair Dobson; Don Gordon; David Hall	Numb	3:57
10.	"To the Hilt"	Lee Altus; Mary Buck; Jürgen Engler	Die Krupps	4:46
11.	"Crackhead" (Tensor Vision Remix)	Tod Law; John Morgan; Ashley Scribner	Unit:187	4:22
12.	"Wrench"	Blake Barnes; Scott Morgan; David York	Apparatus	4:51
13.	"Disease"	Blayne Alexander; John Whatley	Insight 23	4:59
14.	"Locusts"	Athan Maroulis; Matt Green	Spahn Ranch	4:00
15.	"Start Digging"	Steven Seibold	Hate Dept.	4:11

== Personnel ==
Adapted from the Industrial War: The Agony and the Ecstasy of Industrial Music liner notes.

- Wagner Bucci – production
- Sharon Maher – assistant production
- Steve Mannion – cover art, illustrations, design
- Joan Pelosi – design

== Release history ==
Region	Date	Label	Format	Catalog
United States	1997	Shanachie	CD	5722
