= Magnetic Field Remixes =

Compilation album by Chemlab
- Released: October 11, 1994
- Studio: Chicago Trax Recording Studio (Chicago, IL)
- Genre: Industrial rock
- Length: 42:16
- Label: Fifth Colvmn/Metal Blade
- Producer: Hilary Bercovici; Joe Frank; Jared Louche; Dylan Thomas Moore

Chemlab chronology
Burn Out at the Hydrogen Bar (1993)	Magnetic Field Remixes (1994)	East Side Militia (1996)

Magnetic Field Remixes is a compilation album by Chemlab, released on October 11, 1994 by Fifth Colvmn and Metal Blade Records. It served as a way for the band to reissue their 1990 debut EP 10 Ton Pressure with an expanded track listing and the then unreleased song "21st Century".

== Reception ==
Professional ratings
Review scores
Source	Rating
Allmusic	3/5 stars

A critic at allmusic awarded the Magnetic Field Remixes compilation three out of five stars. Sonic Boom described the presentation and mastering as "damn impressive" but was negatively critical of the lyrics, compositions and vocal performances.

== Track listing ==
All lyrics are written by Jared Louche; all music is composed by Dylan Thomas More.

No.	Title	Length
1.	"Chemical Halo" (Bruised Regeneration)	5:45
2.	"21st Century" (Rough Sex Demo)	5:07
3.	"Chemical Halo" (Drag-Strip Download)	7:51
4.	"Codine, Glue and You" (Scorched Remix)	4:45
5.	"Filament/Suture"	5:19
6.	"I Still Bleed"	3:57
7.	"Blunt Force Trauma"	3:32
8.	"Black Radio (In the Neon Blur)/Suture"	6:00

== Personnel ==
Adapted from the Magnetic Field Remixes liner notes.

Chemlab

- Joe Frank – programming, production, engineering
- Jared Louche – lead vocals, production, engineering, illustrations, design
- Dylan Thomas Moore – programming, production, engineering

Additional performers

- Howie Beno – remix (3)
- John DeSalvo – drums
- Geno Lenardo – EBow, guitar
- Krayge Tyler – guitar

Production and design

- Craig Albertson – illustrations, design
- Hilary Bercovici – production, engineering
- Aaron Falk – recording
- Greg Johnson – design
- Newton Moore – cover art, photography
- Zalman Fishman – executive-producer

== Release history ==
Date	Region	Label	Format	Catalog
1994	United States	Fifth Colvmn/Metal Blade	CD	3984-14028
