= Peach of Immortality (band) =

American musical group

- Origin: Washington, D.C., United States
- Genres: Industrial; sound collage
- Years active: 1986-2006
- Labels: Adult Contemporary; Chocolate Monk
- Past members: Jared Louche; Rogelio Maxwell; Tom Smith
- Website: toliveandshaveinla.com

Peach of Immortality was an American band out of Washington, D.C., consisting of Jared Louche, Rogelio Maxwell and Tom Smith. They released four albums on Adult Contemporary Recordings, Need (Thee)! (1984), Talking Heads '77 (1985), "Jehovah" My Black Ass-R.E.M. Is Air Supply! (1986), The Best MUX! (1986).

== History ==
Peach of Immortality was formed by Jared Louche, Rogelio Maxwell, and Tom Smith in June 1984 out of Washington, D.C. In 1984 Adult Contemporary released the band's debut studio album titled Need (Thee)!. Peach of Immortality released their second album in 1985 and titled it Talking Heads '77, named after the debut album of the new wave group Talking Heads. The music was sound collage composition and produced with the assistance of Don Fleming of noise rock group B.A.L.L. In 1986 the band released two more albums for Adult Contemporary titled "Jehovah" My Black Ass-R.E.M. Is Air Supply! and The Best MUX!. After they disbanded, Jared Louche formed Chemlab in 1989 and Tom Smith formed To Live and Shave in L.A. in 1993.

== Discography ==
Studio albums

- Need (Thee)! (1984, Adult Contemporary)
- Talking Heads '77 (1985, Adult Contemporary)
- "Jehovah" My Black Ass-R.E.M. Is Air Supply! (1986, Adult Contemporary)
- The Best MUX! (1986, Adult Contemporary)

Split albums

- To Live and Shave in L.A./Peach of Immortality: "23" of 26 State and Federal Obscenity Determinations/Taxi Corpus II (1996, Chocolate Monk)
- Minimal Man/Peach of Immortality: Hardart Gallery, Washington, DC, November 16, 1984 (2010, Karl Schmidt Verlag)

Video albums

- Succumbs (Restored) (1996, Pum!)

Compilation appearances

- Head Full of Acid (1989, Ugly American Tapes)
- The Real Poison (1996, Xkurzhen Sound)
- Judgement Day: Electronic Music Compilation (1996, Harsh Reality)
- LowLife #14 Free Tape (1996, LowLife)
- Exterminate All Rational Music (1996, \\NULL|ZØNE//)
- LowLife Free Record (1996, RRR/LowLife)
