= Helium (H3llb3nt album) =

Studio album by H3llb3nt
- Released: February 16, 1998
- Recorded: 1996 – 1998
- Studio: Various: Black Socket, London; (London, UK); Doctor Digital; (Portland, OR); Electric Music Foundation; (Minneapolis, MN); Fast Forward; (New York City, NY)
- Genre: Electro-industrial
- Length: 40:41
- Label: Re-Constriction
- Producer: H3llb3nt

H3llb3nt chronology
0.01 (1996)	Helium (1998)	Hardcore Vanilla (2001)

Helium is the second studio album by the electronic band H3llb3nt. It was released in 1998 on Re-Constriction Records.

== Reception ==
CMJ critic David Avery gave the album a positive write-up saying "Helium takes the elements industrial holds dear — sinister, breathy vocals, brutal beatscapes and slicing guitar riffs — and augments them with intelligently programmed rhythmss and a wide range of electro influences." Aiding & Abetting was also enthusiastic, saying despite re-using previously released tracks that fans of the band's debut "will find plenty here to get you going once more."

== Track listing ==
All tracks are written by H3llb3nt.

No.	Title	Length
1.	"3D"	0:39
2.	"Sensual Eventual"	4:43
3.	"Regress"	0:34
4.	"Blue Monochrome"	4:17
5.	"3 Murders, 3 Nights"	4:19
6.	"Electro"	0:31
7.	"Chromed"	4:30
8.	"Overloaded"	5:00
9.	"3D" (version)	4:16
10.	"Burnout"	4:23
11.	"Arom" (edit)	1:56
12.	"Tokyo"	5:03

== Personnel ==
Adapted from the Helium liner notes.

H3llb3nt

- Bryan Barton
- Charles Levi
- Jared Louche
- Jordan Nogood – design
- Eric Powell

Additional musicians

- Joel Allard
- Jon Irish
- Jeff Leyda
- Dylan Thomas More
- Ned Wahl
- Rob Williams

Production

- John Golden – engineering, recording, mixing
- H3llb3nt – production, recording, mixing, mastering
- Mike Larson – mastering

== Release history ==
Region	Date	Label	Format	Catalog
United States	1998	Re-Constriction	CD	REC-034
