= H3llb3nt =

Electro-industrial group

- Genre: Electro-industrial
- Years active: 1995–2001
- Labels: Fifth Colvmn, Invisible, Re-Constriction
- Past members: Bryan Barton; Charles Levi; Jared Louche; Jordan Nogood; Eric Powell

H3llb3nt were an electro-industrial supergroup formed in 1995. The original line-up band consisted of Bryan Barton (of haloblack), Charles Levi (of Pigface), Jared Louche (of Chemlab), Jordan Nogood and Eric Powell (of 16Volt). They released three full-length albums: 0.01 (1996), Helium (1998), Hardcore Vanilla (2001)

== History ==
H3llb3nt was formed in San Francisco by Bryan Barton, Charles Levi, Jared Louche, Jordan Nogood and Eric Powell. The idea came about when Powell and Barton were touring with their bands, 16Volt and haloblack respectively, and decided on collaborating on an electronic music project that and had less emphasis on guitars. Their debut studio album, titled 0.01, was released by Fifth Colvmn Records on February 20, 1996. Sonic Boom called 0.01 an "exquisitely tuned finite element state machine which hums along with a groove all of its own" and only criticized the album for being too short. They followed up that album with 1998's Helium, released by Re-Constriction Records on February 16. Their third album Hardcore Vanilla was released by Invisible on February 6, 2001. The compilation Regurgitator followed on May 29 of that year.

== Discography ==
Studio albums

- 0.01 (Fifth Colvmn, 1996)
- Helium (Re-Constriction, 1998)
- Hardcore Vanilla (Invisible, 2001)

Compilations

- Regurgitator (Invisible, 2001)
