= Demography: The Basement Tapes =

Demography > The Basement Tapes

Compilation album by 16volt
- Released: November 14, 2000
- Recorded: 1987 – 1991
- Genre: Industrial metal; industrial rock
- Length: 53:58
- Label: Cleopatra
- Producer: Eric Powell

16volt chronology
SuperCoolNothing (1998)	Demography > The Basement Tapes (2000)	SuperCoolNothing V2.0 (2002)

Demography > The Basement Tapes is a compilation album by 16volt, released on November 14, 2000, by Cleopatra Records. The album comprises a collection of old, unfinished tracks by the band. Specifically, it contains the Imitation cassette produced in 1991, which helped 16volt secure a place on Re-Constriction Records, and "Out of Time", which was cut from their first album, Wisdom, due to time constraints.

== Reception ==
Fabryka awarded the album three out of four and said "Demography sounds a way hermetic with lots of electronics, less of raw guitars, more of bass sound."

== Track listing ==
All tracks are written by Eric Powell.

No.	Title	Length
1.	"Imitation"	5:00
2.	"Hang Your Head"	3:31
3.	"Hate Rivet"	5:12
4.	"To Another World"	4:35
5.	"Darkest Before Dawn"	5:15
6.	"Sister (Friday) Malediction"	4:37
7.	"Out of Time" (Rough)	4:44
8.	"You Are Free People"	3:45
9.	"Speed Pig"	4:53
10.	"Too Late"	4:09
11.	"This"	3:51
12.	"I Make It Rain"	4:25

== Personnel ==
Adapted from the Demography > The Basement Tapes liner notes.

16volt

- Eric Powell – lead vocals, arrangements, production, engineering, design

Production and design

- Judson Leach – mastering

== Release history ==
Region	Date	Label	Format	Catalog
United States	2000	Cleopatra	CD	008 633 134
United States	2009		DL	
