= American Porn Songs =

Studio album by 16volt
- Released: September 8, 2009
- Genre: Industrial rock; alternative metal
- Length: 55:10
- Label: Metropolis
- Producer: Eric Powell

16volt chronology
FullBlackHabit (2007)	American Porn Songs (2009)	American Porn Songs: Remixed (2010)

American Porn Songs is the sixth studio album by 16volt, released on September 8, 2009 by Metropolis Records.

== Reception ==
Professional ratings
Review scores
Source	Rating
AllMusic	3.5/5 stars

David Jeffries of AllMusic awarded American Porn Songs three and a half out of five stars, called it the most cohesive album Eric Powell had composed and said "everything on the album sounds genuinely inspired, coming straight from Powell's ever-blackening heart as if it just needed to get out." Brutal Resonance commended the production quality and composition variety, saying "there are some tracks on this album that vary but most of the tracks follow the same line and it's a pretty straight forward album." Soundsphere Magazine gave the album four out of five stars, praised the music's energetic blend of electro and metal music and called it "a hard-hitting attack on the porn industry and its effect on those who take part."

== Track listing ==
All tracks are written by Eric Powell, except "Enjoy the Pain", "With Fire and Burning" and "Somebody to Hate" co-written with Scott Robison.

No.	Title	Length
1.	"Alkali"	4:55
2.	"Enjoy the Pain"	3:03
3.	"With Fire and Burning"	3:54
4.	"American Porn Song"	3:59
5.	"Blessed"	3:43
6.	"To Hell"	3:43
7.	"It Turns All Bad"	4:19
8.	"Blackbird"	3:40
9.	"The Lord Doesn't Want Her"	3:34
10.	"Become Your None"	3:17
11.	"Can You Find God?"	4:39
12.	"Orange Insect"	3:50
13.	"Useless People"	2:50
14.	"Somebody to Hate"	3:14
15.	"American Bomb Song"	2:30

== Personnel ==
Adapted from the American Porn Songs liner notes.

16volt

- Jason Bazinet – drums
- Mike Peoples – bass guitar, guitars
- Eric Powell – lead vocals, guitars, programming, keyboards, production, recording, mixing, cover art
- Steve White (as Steve Pig) – guitars

Additional performers

- Joseph Bishara - programming
- John "Servo" DeSalvo – drums
- Sean Payne – programming
- Scott Robison – guitars, programming
- Bill Sarver (as Billdeaux) – guitars, programming
- Tim Sköld – guitars, programming

Production and design

- Ryan Foster – mastering

== Release history ==
Region	Date	Label	Format	Catalog
United States	2009	Metropolis	CD, DL	MET 600
