= The Negative Space =

Studio album by 16volt
- Released: September 14, 2016
- Recorded: January – June 2016
- Studio: Cloud City Sound (Portland, Oregon)
- Genre: Industrial metal; industrial rock
- Length: 42:21
- Label: Murder Creek
- Producer: Marc Jordan

16volt chronology
Beating Dead Horses (2011)	The Negative Space (2016)	Dead on Arrivals (2017)

The Negative Space is the eighth studio album by 16volt, released on September 14, 2016, by Murder Creek.

== Reception ==
ReGen Magazine awarded the album four out of five stars and said "the album hits hard with a confidence that can only come from years of successfully honing craft and playing to the strengths and signatures that audiences have come to love and expect from 16volt."

== Track listing ==
All tracks are written by Marc Jordan and Eric Powell.

No.	Title	Length
1.	"The Electric Pope"	3:17
2.	"The Infernal Paramour"	3:37
3.	"The Last Time"	4:08
4.	"The Greatest Worst Thing Ever"	4:59
5.	"The Hunter"	3:44
6.	"The Ever Immortal Nurse"	4:16
7.	"The Heavy Dreams"	3:26
8.	"The Man Comes Around"	4:47
9.	"The Perfect One"	3:04
10.	"The Mission"	3:48
11.	"The Negative Space"	3:15

== Personnel ==
Adapted from the liner notes of The Negative Space.

16volt

- Eric Powell – lead vocals, instruments

Production and design

- Marc Jordan – production, recording, mixing
- Artemis Sere – cover art
- Howie Weinberg – mastering

== Release history ==
Region	Date	Label	Format	Catalog
United States	2016	Murder Creek	CD, DL, LP	MC001
