= Oxidizer (album) =

Studio album by Chemlab
- Released: January 27, 2004
- Studio: Various: CrackNation Studios; (Chicago, IL); Fortress Studios; (London, UK)
- Genre: Industrial rock
- Length: 49:40
- Label: Underground Inc.
- Producer: Julian Beeston; Jamie Duffy; Jared Louche; Jason Novak

Chemlab chronology
The Machine Age (2003)	Oxidizer (2004)	Rock Whore vs. Dance Floor (2006)

Oxidizer is the third and final studio album by Chemlab, released on January 27, 2004, by Underground Inc.

== Alternate versions and controversy ==
Jason Novak, credited as DJ? Acucrack and a member of Acumen Nation, was responsible for the original production of Oxidizer, but according to Novak, his finished tracks were "remixed" by other producers at Louche's behest, changing the album significantly in terms of the album's sound, 'sutures' and track order by the time of its official release. Novak notes that the original version of the album "reflected the proper spirit of Chemlab", and that he did not receive proper credit on the official release, despite being responsible for the majority of the music.

== Reception ==
Professional ratings
Review scores
Source	Rating
AllMusic	3/5 stars

AllMusic awarded the Oxidizer album three out of five possible stars. Matthew Moyer of Ink 19 praised the atmosphere and programming of the music.

== Track listing ==
All tracks are written by F.J. DeSanto, Jamie Duffy, Jared Louche and Jason Novak, except "sutures" co-written with Anders Karlsson and Ross Tregenza.

No.	Title	Length
1.	"Pinksuture"	1:56
2.	"Monkey God"	3:35
3.	"White Room Black Eye"	3:46
4.	"suture"	0:50
5.	"Black Snake Voodoo Hiss"	4:22
6.	"Atomic Automatic"	4:24
7.	"Force Quit"	4:36
8.	"Sue"	2:10
9.	"Scornocopia"	5:01
10.	"Megahurts"	5:12
11.	"Binary Nation"	4:05
12.	"Queen of Despair (Ode to the Diode)"	4:48
13.	"suture"	4:53

== Personnel ==
Adapted from the Oxidizer liner notes.

Chemlab

- F.J. DeSanto – loops, noises
- Jamie Duffy – guitar, loops, production, recording
- Jared Louche – lead vocals, programming, arrangements, production
- Jason Novak – synthesizer, guitar, production, recording

Additional performers

- Dan Brill – drums (2, 9, 11)
- Russ Britton – scratching (10)
- Eliot Engelman – bass guitar (7, 9)
- Ethan Novak – drums (5)
- Geno Leonardo – sampler
- Charles Levi – bass guitar
- Dylan Thomas More – sampler (13)
- Ross Tregenza – scratching
- William Tucker – sampler (1)
- Krayge Tyler – sampler
- H. Vargas – synthesizer (10, 11)
- Mike Venezia – loops
- Ned Wahl – sampler

Production and design

- Julian Beeston – production, recording
- Bryan Black – recording
- Michael Doyle – illustrations, design
- Marc Plastic – 72 Hero
- Dave Suycott – mastering

== Release history ==
Date	Region	Label	Format	Catalog
2004	United States	Underground, Inc.	CD	UIN1068
