= Digital Wings 1 =

Compilation album by Various artists
- Released: 1997
- Recorded: 1990 – 1997
- Genres: industrial; darkwave; ambient
- Length: 70:47
- Label: The Cyberden

Digital Wings 1 is a various artists compilation album released in 1997 released by The Cyberden.

== Reception ==
In their review of the album, Chaos Control said "the production is always good, making Digital Wings 1 an ideal sampler of current underground electronic acts." Electro Zine said "while some of the tracks arent fabulous they are all still a great effort, the standouts of Course being the opening track by Xorcist, Gridlock's track from their debut cd and the nice piece of darkwave ambient by Seofon." Last Sigh said "this CD heralds an array of verytasty bands and sounds not to be missed by those of you who enjoy the dark electro death-ambient definitive power glide of said genres" and called it "an excellent compilation for the power electro enthusiast."

== Track listing ==
No.	Title	Writer(s)	Artist	Length
1.	"Bad Mojo" (Satyria Mix)	Peter Stone	Xorcist	7:39
2.	"Powerclone"	Philip Caldwell; Steve Watkins	Scar Tissue	3:07
3.	"Ygrene Citenik"	Claus Larsen	Klute	11:38
4.	"5-Space"	Jeffrey Kihn	Seofon	6:26
5.	"Exorcise"	John Christgau	Retina	3:00
6.	"Disease"	Blayne Alexander; John Whatley	Insight 23	5:03
7.	"Sample This"	Bill T. Miller	Out of Band Experience	3:37
8.	"Sickness"	Mike Cadoo; Mike Wells	Gridlock	5:05
9.	"Smartbeets"	Josh Randall	Institute of Technology	4:44
10.	"Shattered Belief"	K.C. Belchamber; Lector Broderick; Travis Crocker; Dave Redemer	The Bleeding Stone	4:07
11.	"Incinerating Lucidity"	Tahoe Foster; Jeff Kihn	Never	6:29
12.	"(Off Shortwave Radio)"		Intercepted Alien Transmission	2:55
13.	"Icon Jazz"	Stone	Xenon	6:57

== Personnel ==
Adapted from the Digital Wings 1 liner notes.

== Release history ==
Region	Date	Label	Format	Catalog
United States	1997	The Cyberden	CD	CD-01
