= J. F. Coleman =

United States Marine Corps officer

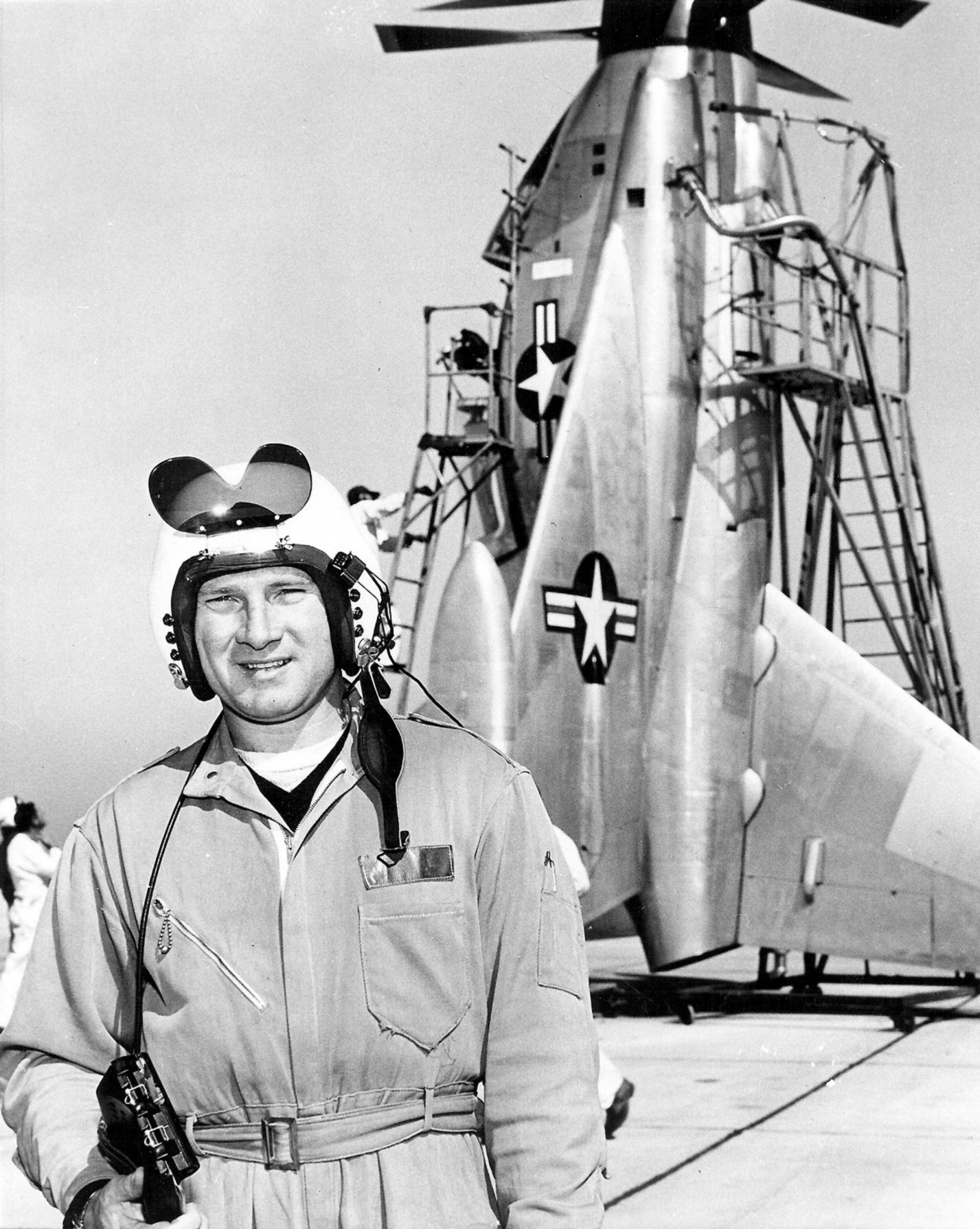
Coleman in front of the Convair XFY Pogo

James Francis Coleman (June 2, 1918 – May 13, 2014), nicknamed "Skeets", was an American military fighter and test pilot.

Born in Chicago, Illinois, Coleman joined the United States Marine Corps in 1941. During the Pacific Ocean theater of World War II, he was a fighter pilot flying dive bombing missions. After the war, he received an aeronautical engineering degree from UCLA. From 1948 to 1950, he oversaw the operation of the now-defunct Del Mar Airport in San Diego, California. He would go on to work in sales and marketing for aviation companies, such as North American Aviation and Fairchild Aircraft.

In 1951, Convair, an airplane manufacturer, was one of two companies contracted by the U.S. Navy to construct and test a vertical-takeoff-and-landing (VTOL) fighter. Convair created the tail-sitter XFY Pogo. Coleman, a Marine reservist and Convair employee, was chosen to be its test pilot when it was ready in 1954. Although the Pogo's liftoffs and transitions went smoothly, Coleman and other pilots had difficulty landing it, which had to be done visually from the cockpit. The Pogo project would prove to be unwieldy and was discontinued. About the project, Coleman stated, "It was a developmental power plant, it was a developmental airplane, a developmental concept. It's pretty hard to tie all of those together without having a lot of risk." For being the first pilot to successfully maneuver a VTOL fighter, Coleman was awarded the Harmon Trophy in 1954.

Coleman resigned from Convair, it was announced on 3 April 1956.

In 2014, Coleman died of natural causes at an assisted-living facility in Oceanside, California. He was 95. He was survived by three children.
