= Primal (video game) =

2003 video game

- European box art
- Developer: Sony Computer Entertainment Europe
- Publisher: Sony Computer Entertainment
- Producers: Jean-Baptiste Bolcato; Mark Green
- Designers: Katie Lea; Alex Sulman; Robert King
- Programmer: James Busby
- Artist: Mark Gibbons
- Writer: Jonathan Ashley
- Composers: Paul Arnold; Andrew Barnabas; 16Volt
- Platform: PlayStation 2
- Release: NA: 25 March 2003; EU: 11 April 2003
- Genre: Action-adventure
- Mode: Single-player

Primal is a 2003 action-adventure game developed by Sony Computer Entertainment Europe (later credited to its Cambridge Studio) and published by Sony Computer Entertainment for the PlayStation 2.

The game follows Jen, who has to restore balance to a group of troubled realms using demonic transformations alongside her gargoyle companion, Scree. Described as ambitious but flawed, the game received polarised reviews from critics. While its story, atmosphere, characters, voice acting, and high production value were praised, the combat, puzzles, and controls were seen as lacking. Marketed as one of Sony's potential new cornerstone franchises, it failed to meet sales expectations and a sequel was shelved early in development.

== Gameplay ==
Jen (left) fighting underwater in her Undine form. Her demonic transformations give her access to various new abilities, in this case, to swim, breathe underwater, and use electric energy tentacles to attack.

Primal is played from a third person perspective. The game features a mixture of action and combat sequences, where the player has to fight various enemies, or alternatively flee from or chase them, while also heavily relying on exploration and the solving of puzzles to advance through the levels. Levels are designed so that they have to backtracked multiple times, for example when a new core skill or item has been acquired that allows further progression. Each world features a specific demonic transformation that gives Jen skills, allowing her to access areas she previously could not. For instance, the Undine transformation allows Jen to breathe underwater, while the Wraith form provides the ability to slow time. Later worlds require the player to use multiple transformations to progress.

Most of the time, control can be freely switched between Jen and Scree. When in control of one, the other will be operated by an artificial intelligence (AI). During play, the characters can interact with one another, performing actions such as asking questions, or siphoning energy. When in control of Jen, the player may transform into one of four demonic forms that are unlocked over the course of the story, all of which boost her attack and defense and give access to various abilities. Combat was designed specifically so that the forms have to be switched mid-fight, as to use the advantages and specific weaponry of each race. Later in the game, this systems allows for intricate combinations, as each form possesses over 20 different moves. Jen can replenish health by absorbing demonic energy, which Scree can also store. When in control of Scree, the player is invulnerable, as Scree is made out of stone. This allows him to traverse areas Jen cannot, such as lava or poisonous water. Aside from storing energy for Jen, he can revive her should her energy meter reach zero. Additionally, Scree can possess statues for various purposes.

== Synopsis ==
=== Setting ===
The game is mainly set in Oblivion, a plane between the worlds, in which a careful balance between the forces of Order and Chaos is kept. Both are presented as primordial beings vying for control, with the female Arella personifying Order and the male Abaddon Chaos, respectively. Should one of the two become too dominant, the multiple worlds connected to Oblivion would perish, which is why a third power known as Chronos is tasked with maintaining balance. To do so, it resides in the Nexus, the place where the life energy of all worlds intertwines. Prior to the game, Abbadon has tipped the balance in his favor by corrupting other realms.

While multiple worlds are implied to be connected to Oblivion, only five appear in the game. Earth, known as Mortalis to the other worlds, is a neutral world inhabited by humans, from which the game's protagonist, Jen, hails. The other worlds, whose creatures are referred to as demons, either align with Order or Chaos and their inhabitants are portrayed as good or evil, respectively. Solum is a world cast into darkness, yet its inhabitants, the Ferai, humanoid ovis, align with Order, as do the water-dwelling Undine, who reside in the aquatic world of Aquis. Wraith dominate the world of Aetha, vampire-like creatures that live in an aristocratic society, where the high-born feed on the enslaved. The volcanic world of Volca is inhabited by the Djinn, proud and malevolent spirits of great power.

=== Characters ===
The game's protagonist Jennifer "Jen" Tate (Hudson Leick), a rebellious young woman who grew up an orphan, discovers that she possesses mystical powers that allow her to assume the forms of the creatures inhabiting other worlds. While chosen by the goddess Arella to restore balance between Order and Chaos, she at first shuns her new responsibility, as she has not sought such fate. Jen is searching for her boyfriend Lewis, who is presumed to be somewhere in Oblivion. She is assisted on her journey by Scree (Andreas Katsulas), the primary servant of Arella. A powerful demon originally known as Abdizur, he was reduced to the form of a gargoyle after losing a fight with his nemesis, Abaddon's chief henchman Belahzur, prior to the events of the game. In each world, the duo encounters a queen and a king as well as other inhabitants, that either help or hinder them on their journey. This was done as the game was mimicked after the tarot deck during development

=== Plot ===
Jennifer "Jen" Tate has just attended a rock concert of her boyfriend Lewis's band, when both of them are attacked by a demonic creature outside the venue. She is reduced to a comatose state and has an out-of-body experience after she is touched by a gargoyle, Scree. He transports her to the Nexus, where he informs her that she is caught between life and death and can only save her life if she restores balance to the realms of Oblivion. He hands her a set of bracelets that allows her to channel the energy of the worlds she visits and absorb the powers of its demonic inhabitants. Despite being unwilling to accept such a huge task, Jen reluctantly agrees to save her boyfriend, who she learns has gone missing and is somewhere in Oblivion.

Accompanied by Scree, she visits the world of Solum, where the realm's king, Herne, has refused to commit the ritualistic suicide expected of him to restore his world, throwing it into chaos and disarray. They find out that Herne is unable to kill himself, as his son and successor, Jared, was abducted. Herne grants Jen her first demonic transformation, allowing her to find Jared, who reveals that the king's wife is actually a shapeshifting alien imposter who has killed the real queen. After Jared is freed and the imposter revealed by burning the real queen's body, Herne kills both himself and the imposter by jumping off a cliff, leaving Jared as king and restoring Order to the world.

In the sub-aquatic realm of Aquis, Abaddon's henchmen have sabotaged the world's water purification system, poisoning the sophisticated Undine, including their ruler, Adaro. His mind clouded by the poison, he plans to sacrifice his wife Aino to restore the waters. The latter grants Jen, who cannot swim, the ability to transform into an Undine hybrid, allowing her to freely roam the waters and restore the purification system. Adaro, driven further into madness, claims only a sacrifice will ensure his people's survival and forces Jen to fight and kill him in order to restart the system, after which Order is restored.

When Jen refuses to help her further, a weakening Arella reveals the truth: Jen and Lewis – both orphaned at a young age – were kidnapped by Abbadon as infants. He experimented on them and turned them into human-demon hybrids in order to defeat Arella and rule supreme. When Arella discovered this, she sent Scree, then known as the powerful Abdizur, to save them. At the cost of his own freedom, Abdizur saved them, with the ensuing torture reducing him to his current gargoyle form. On Earth, Lewis and Jen found each other again because their fates are connected. Moved by this, Jen decides to help Arella restore balance by driving back the forces of Chaos in their two homeworlds.

In Aetha, Scree and Jen notice that the world has drifted further into evil, as its cruel rulers, Count Raum and his wife Countess Empusa, have created a Blood Machine, a device that kills and harvests the blood of peasants they sacrifice, boosting their own power. After escaping capture, Jen notices that their new-found power is too strong for her to overcome, even after obtaining her Wraith form. Realizing that their Blood Machine can be used against them, the duo taint it with Jen's hybrid blood, which weakens Raum and Empusa. In the ensuing fight, Jen kills them both, ending their diabolical rule and weakening the world's Chaos.

However, when they return to the Nexus, Arella is gone and Abaddon has taken over. Jen witnesses Lewis, who has fully succumbed to Chaos, kill Chronos, leaving her distraught. Desperate, Jen and Scree visit the final world of Volca to find a way to restore Chronos.

There, they encounter the realm's evil king, the immortal Iblis, who gives Jen access to her Djinn form seemingly out of morbid curiosity. However, when Jen masters her powers, he reveals his ruse and enslaves her, as he can control her through the corrupted essence he provided her. However, Scree manages to free her mind with the help of Queen Malikel, who secretly wishes death upon her husband and tells the duo how to defeat him. After a final confrontation, Iblis is killed by Malikel, who has realized that the death of Chronos would ultimately lead to the death of her world as well. She breaks the stone that granted Iblis immortality in half and succeeds him as ruler, with the other half being used to revive Chronos.

Back in the Nexus, Jen and Scree, who uses his remaining energy to transform back into Abdizur, have to fight Lewis and Belahzur in a final confrontation. While Belazhur is presumably killed by Abdizur, Jen tries to talk sense into Lewis, but is forced to kill him, devastating her. Abdizur and Arella console her and explain that now that Chronos is revived, there is a small chance for Lewis to return to his mortal body, if his soul finds his way through the Nexus. They transport Jen back to her world, where she is seen reading to a comatose Lewis in a post-credits scene.

== Development ==
Development of the game started in August 1999 and finished in early 2003. According to creative director Chris Sorrell, the development team had total freedom in how they created the game. The game's core influences were supernatural TV shows of the time, such as Buffy the Vampire Slayer, Angel and Dark Angel, whose protagonists and visual style the game emulated while incorporating own artistic visions. Buffy served as a model because the developers wanted to create a "believable and vulnerable lead character, to have a fantastical storyline [...] that balances action and horror with humour and character development." The voice actors for the protagonists Jen and Scree, Hudson Leick and Andreas Katsulas, respectively, were specifically chosen because of their previous work in supernatural and science fiction series. Leick was brought in based on her work in Xena: Warrior Princess, where she played a character that was turned from a mortal into a demigod, similar to Jen. Katuslas, on the other hand, was cast because of his work as G'Kar in Babylon 5, but mainly because of his commanding voice. Both actors had never worked on a video game before. Originally, Jen was envisioned as a clubber, however, this was seen as unbefitting her demonic transformation. After more than 100 concept sketches, the team settled on her distinctive goth look.

Lead character animator Mitch Philips noted the game's ambitiousness. As the protagonist was to switch forms mid-combat in seamless animation, the 30 fps the PlayStation 2 could muster proved insufficient to support every combat animation. Specifically recalling the underwater and whip combat as challenging, Philips noted that later games, such as Bayonetta, have build on this more successfully. The developers made the conscious decision to use the shoulder buttons for combat – unusual at the time – to provide a fresh and more immersive gameplay experience. According to Sorrell, Soul Calibur and Tekken were direct inspirations for the game's combat design, while noting that the game was a huge step up from the team's previous series MediEvil, using all they had learned during its development to make a superior game. This was echoed by Gibbons, who noted: "Primal was Sony Cambridge's first game for PS2 and I recall our team experimenting a great deal with what the console could handle graphically. We had grand ambitions for the world and really pushed against the PS2 boundaries at the time."

Lead artist Mark Gibbons further noted the game was heavily influenced by the tarot deck during development, which was later scaled back but prevalent in structures such as every world having a king and a queen and hidden collectable tarot cards. Furthermore, Sorrell stressed the focus on visuals, noting that not only the graphics were superior, but also that a great amount of detail was put in making each civilization have a unique architecture and visual style. However, he noted that coincidences with other fantasy games such as Devil May Cry or Legacy of Kain: Soul Reaver were purely incidental, while Soul Calibur was the only game the developers actively studied for inspiration, but only in respect to combat.

=== Marketing ===
The game had a marketing budget of $8.7 million. The debut demo of the game was revealed at the 2002 PlayStation Experience at the European Computer Trade Show. Multiple trailers as well as a game demo were released. In the PAL region, a limited collector's edition with a shiny cover, a soundtrack CD with exclusive remixes, as well as a numbered VIP card that gave access to a special website was available. To further promote the game, a tie-in comic book was published by Com.X. Serving as an introduction to the setting and premise of the game, it was written by Russell Uttley with art by Ben Oliver and Joshua Middleton, from a story by Chris Sorrell.

=== Music ===
Primal features music by electronic rock band 16Volt, after Sorrell wrote them a chance e-mail, as they were his favorite band. The game's combat tracks feature on their album SuperCoolNothing V2.0, and the band had a cameo appearance in Primal, where they played in a club in the opening cut scene. In an interview for the Official U.S. PlayStation Magazine, the band's singer and bassist lauded the game for how well it used their songs to accompany not only fights but also multiple other cutscenes, setting the tone for the game. The "cinematic tracks" were composed by Andrew Barnabas and performed by the City of Prague Philharmonic Orchestra. A suite dedicated to its music was performed as part of the 2003 Games Convention at the inaugural Symphonic Game Music Concerts in Leipzig.

== Reception ==
Reception

Aggregate score
Aggregator	Score
Metacritic	73/100

Review scores
Publication	Score
Edge	4/10
Electronic Gaming Monthly	7/10
Eurogamer	5/10
Game Informer	6.75/10
GamePro	3/5
GameSpot	7.9/10
GameSpy	3/5
GameZone	8/10
IGN	8/10
Official U.S. PlayStation Magazine	4/5
The Cincinnati Enquirer	4/4

Primal received "mixed or average" reviews, according to review aggregator Metacritic. While most critics lauded the graphics, atmosphere, story, soundtrack, voice acting, and characters, they were more critical of the combat system, level design, puzzles and general gameplay.

Electronic Gaming Monthly (EGM) noted that it was one of the few newer PS2 games that could compete with the more powerful Xbox in terms of graphics, while the voice acting and sound were also noted to be "impressive". Matt Helgeson of Game Informer went as far as to claim that, "Primal is a visual masterpiece. The texturing and lighting effects are some of the best that you'll see on PS2, and the character models (especially during the real-time cutscenes) rival some of Square's best work." However, he noted that, "Primal is a technical marvel; but, like so many games, falls short in the design and gameplay." Greg Kasavin of GameSpot also lauded the game's "excellent production values, between its outstanding graphics and first-rate voice acting, and it also has some clever twists and original ideas", while noting that the game had "some of the sharpest textures and special effects to date on the PS2. The game's big environments stream seamlessly together, and being able to run from one end of these imaginative areas to the other is pretty impressive."

EGM felt the combat to be "mindlessly repetitive, its puzzles aren't very inventive, and there are often long, boring stretches between the action." Kristan Reed of Eurogamer was critical of the poor AI, where most opponents would just wait to be killed instead of attacking, rendering the combat dull and repetitive. Reed also noted poor and glitchy camera and the overabundance of puzzles but was especially critical of the level structure, which required constant backtracking and checking the map, claiming that otherwise the game would "degenerate into a frustrating aimless wandering farce in no-time." Conversely, Kasavin noted that the help and Scree's directional advice were made the game good to manouvre. Dan Elektro of GamePro also pointed out how slow the constant backtracking and dull combat made the game feel, additionally pointing out that this was increased by the slow and cumbersome walking pace of both protagonists. Helgeson also echoed this feeling, musing that the entire puzzle gameplay came down to constantly switching between Jen and Scree, leading to a dull and repetitive experience. IGN said that the game was "Limited by an inconsequential combat system and basic wander-puzzles. What it does manage to do though is overwhelm us with high-quality production values, wow us with an excellent graphical presentation, and move us with one hell of a killer soundtrack."

Positive aspects of reviews centered around the characters and story. Jen was positively described as a mixture of Lara Croft and Dante by Reed, while Kasavin felt that "Jen and Scree are likable even from the start, and despite the dark subject matter of Primal, the two are often amusing." Another review declared Scree to be, "the most downright likeable videogame character since Vivi in Final Fantasy IX" Multiple reviews pointed out Jen's physical attractiveness: Chris Baker, writing for Official U.S. PlayStation Magazine (OPM), went as far as professing to being attracted to her, musing: "I really dig her. She's smart, funny, hot... my kind of girl. I'd ask her out if... Oh, wait. She's a game character.", which he felt pointed to how engaging the story is. In the article "Overrated/Underrated" in their September 2004 issue, OPM cited the game's protagonist as an underrated "hot chick" in comparison to Croft, stating "She's smart. She's funny. She hangs out in biker bars. She's good in a fight. And she's got a really nice butt." In the same article, Scree was likewise cited as an underrated sidekick, stating "This is the way to make a memorable sidekick: Make him dignified, make him funny looking, and make him useful."

== Legacy ==
Concept artwork for Primal II, depicting Jen with a motorcycle and an energy-infused sword, indicating new gameplay mechanics.

In a 2012 blog post for PlayStation.Blog that commemorated the game's 10 year anniversary and its inclusion to PSN, lead artist Mark Gibbons noted that preliminary work on a sequel was begun that would have featured Lewis as the protagonist. Primal II would have told the story of his journey through hell, back to the real world. Answering fan questions, Chris Sorrell further added that another idea was having the demons enter the real world, with Jen being tasked with fighting them alongside allies from the first entry. However, as the game did not sell well, the sequel was shelved in favor of 24: The Game, based on the TV show of the same name. A large amount of development artwork from the game, including concept art for Primal II, is held in the archive of The Centre for Computing History, and is in the process of being made available to view online as part of their video game preservation initiative.

In the same post, Sorrell asserted that "in some regards our ambition exceeded our reach, and that the path we took with Primal was at odds with the larger directions the gaming world was headed", especially in regards to open world games and social play, but noted that this contributes to the notion that Primal is a unique piece of gaming history. On the other hand, Gibbons stated that he either gets enthusiastic or indifferent responses to the game as well as regularly meeting people sporting Jen's signature tattoo, which he claims prove its status as a cult classic. Conversely, Ivy Taylor, writing for Eurogamer, noted that a lot of the game has aged badly, singling out the opening sequence as "cringe-inducing", as – according to the author – nothing about the 2000s goth subculture Primal has heavily leaned into had aged well. Taylor also pointed to the outdated and laborious gameplay, but noted that "the developers clearly set their sights beyond what they could ever achieve, but the sheer attempted scope of Primal is unmatched by most modern games", further claiming that the game flew "too close to the sun, failing at almost everything it set out to do", yet lauding its scope and ambitiousness. Closing with the notion, that in all his years as a gamer, he has never played another game quite like it, Taylor surmised: "It's not a game I will ever enjoy again, but for all its flaws, I love it dearly."

GameRant included Primal on its list of the best PlayStation 2 horror games as well as a list of underrated PS2 games. It was also included in a similar list by Den of Geek. The game has also attracted scholarly attention. In a 2005 article, video game scholar Tanya Krzywinska researched how the game draws from shows such as Buffy the Vampire Slayer to create mass appeal and how it constructs its protagonist after the show's eponymous title character.

In February 2012, the game was made available for the PlayStation 3 through the PlayStation Network (PSN) with slightly improved graphics and trophy support. In May 2016, the port was made available for the PlayStation 4 through PSN.
