= LetDownCrush =

Studio album by 16volt
- Released: August 7, 1996
- Recorded: 1996
- Studio: Various: Chicago Trax Recording; (Chicago, IL); Dead Aunt Thelmas; (Portland, OR); The Red Light Room; (Portland, OR); The Litter Box; (Portland, OR)
- Genres: Industrial rock; industrial metal
- Length: 40:17
- Label: Cargo/Re-Constriction
- Producers: Jeff "Critter" Newell; Eric Powell

16volt chronology
Skin (1994)	LetDownCrush (1996)	The Remix Wars: Strike 3 (1997)

Singles from LetDownCrush
- 1. "The Dreams That Rot in Your Heart" Released: July 23, 1996

LetDownCrush is the third studio album by 16volt, released on August 7, 1996, by Cargo and Re-Constriction Records.

== Reception ==
Professional ratings
Review scores
Source	Rating
AllMusic	3/5 stars
Alternative Press	3/5 stars

AllMusic awarded LetDownCrush three out of five possible stars. Aiding & Abetting gave the album a mixed review as well, calling LetDownCrush "diverse, and while obviously not a live-to-tape session, more immediate-sounding" and praised the songs for being "tight and vicious." Alternative Press gave the album a positive review, saying "Hard beats dominate, and beefy guitar plays right into them, maximizing their power to make you wig." Black Monday noted the band's artistic progression in combining the song structure of Skin with the electronics of Wisdom but criticized the metal influences. Sonic Boom lauded Eric Powell's musical maturation and said "the best musical elements from all of his previous work appear like a trail of footprints down well trod path which ends at the edge of a precipice."

== Track listing ==
No.	Title	Writer(s)	Length
1.	"Swarm"	Marc LaCorte, Eric Powell	3:23
2.	"The Dreams That Rot in Your Heart"	Marc LaCorte, Eric Powell	3:28
3.	"A Cloth Like Gauze"	Eric Powell	4:03
4.	"Something Left"	Marc LaCorte, Eric Powell	4:00
5.	"The Cut Collector"	Eric Powell	3:52
6.	"Crush"	Marc LaCorte, Eric Powell	4:47
7.	"Breed"	Eric Powell	3:15
8.	"Two Wires Thin"	Eric Powell	4:00
9.	"Shameface"	Eric Powell	3:09
10.	"Carla's Tarantulas"	Eric Powell	5:59

2012 Remastered CD
No.	Title	Writer(s)	Length
11.	"We Ain't Goin' Out Like That" (Cypress Hill cover)	Louis Freese, Lawrence Muggerud, Richard Todd Ray	4:15

== Accolades ==
Year	Publication	Country	Accolade	Rank
1995	CMJ New Music Monthly	United States	"Dance"	16
"*" denotes an unordered list.

== Personnel ==
Adapted from the LetDownCrush liner notes.

16volt

- Marc LaCorte – guitar, programming
- Eric Powell – lead vocals, programming, guitar, production, engineering, editing, recording (3, 7, 9), mixing (4)

Addition performers

- Bryan Barton – loops (8)
- Stella Katsoudas – vocals (1)
- Dan Pred – live drums (3)
- Ed Tinley (10)
- William Tucker – additional guitar (10), lead guitar (5)

Production and design

- Dave Friedlander – engineering, mixing (7, 9)
- Bill Garcelon – engineering
- Matt Gibson – engineering
- Zlatko Hukic – engineering
- Jon Irish – engineering, recording (1, 2, 5, 6, 8), mixing (4)
- Rick McMillen – mastering
- Esther Nevarez – engineering
- Jeff "Critter" Newell – production, engineering, mixing (1, 2, 5, 6, 8), recording (3, 7, 9)
- Jordan Nogood – design
- Ed Tinley – engineering

== Release history ==
Region	Date	Label	Format	Catalog
United States	1996	Cargo	CD	72324 84506 27
United States	1996	Re-Constriction	CS	REC-022
United States	2012	Metropolis	CD, DL	MET 774
