= 0.01 (album) =

200

Studio album by H3llb3nt
- Released: February 20, 1996
- Recorded: 1995
- Studio: Various: Doctor Digital; (Portland, OR); Electric Music Foundation; (Minneapolis, MN); Fast Forward; (New York City, NY)
- Genre: Electro-industrial
- Length: 36:31
- Label: Fifth Colvmn
- Producer: John Golden

H3llb3nt chronology
200 (1996)	Helium (1998)

0.01 is the debut studio album of H3llb3nt, released on February 20, 1996 by Fifth Colvmn Records. Sonic Boom called 0.01 an "exquisitely tuned finite element state machine which hums along with a groove all of its own" and only criticized the album for being too short.

== Track listing ==
All tracks are written by H3llb3nt.

No.	Title	Length
1.	"Burn Out"	4:24
2.	"Sleeper"	3:51
3.	"Regress" (edit)	0:34
4.	"Chromed"	4:29
5.	"Overloaded"	5:01
6.	"3 Murders, 3 Nights"	4:21
7.	"Bite Down"	5:14
8.	"Anti-Cool"	4:14
9.	"Breathe"	4:23

== Personnel ==
Adapted from the 0.01 liner notes.

H3llb3nt

- Bryan Barton
- Charles Levi
- Jared Louche
- Jordan Nogood – design
- Eric Powell

Additional musicians

- Jon Irish
- Dylan Thomas More
- Ned Wahl
- Rob Williams

Production

- John Golden – production, engineering, mixing
- H3llb3nt – engineering, mixing
- Greg Reierson – mastering

== Release history ==
Region	Date	Label	Format	Catalog
United States	1996	Fifth Colvmn	CD	9868-63210
