= Hell, California =

Hell
- Location within California
- Coordinates: 33°41′27″N 115°16′22″W
- Country: United States
- State: California
- County: Riverside
- Elevation: 758 ft (231 m)
- Time zone: UTC-8 (PST)
  - Summer (DST): UTC-7 (PDT)

Hell is a location in Riverside County, California, United States, approximately 29 miles (47 km) west of Blythe on Interstate 10.

== Geography ==
As befits its name to many people, Hell has a climate stereotypical of a hot desert (Köppen classification BWh). In the absence of a weather station at the site of the defunct town, nearby Desert Center collects weather information.

Climate data for Desert Center, California
Month	Jan	Feb	Mar	Apr	May	Jun	Jul	Aug	Sep	Oct	Nov	Dec	Year
Record high °F (°C)	85 (29)	91 (33)	102 (39)	105 (41)	111 (44)	120 (49)	118 (48)	117 (47)	117 (47)	109 (43)	93 (34)	85 (29)	120 (49)
Mean daily maximum °F (°C)	65 (18)	69 (21)	75 (24)	82 (28)	90 (32)	100 (38)	104 (40)	103 (39)	97 (36)	86 (30)	73 (23)	65 (18)	84.1 (28.9)
Mean daily minimum °F (°C)	45 (7)	49 (9)	54 (12)	60 (16)	68 (20)	77 (25)	83 (28)	81 (27)	75 (24)	64 (18)	53 (12)	45 (7)	62.8 (17.1)
Record low °F (°C)	24 (−4)	29 (−2)	31 (−1)	42 (6)	45 (7)	57 (14)	64 (18)	53 (12)	56 (13)	37 (3)	35 (2)	25 (−4)	25 (−4)
Average precipitation inches (mm)	0.58 (15)	0.53 (13)	0.50 (13)	0.08 (2.0)	0.08 (2.0)	0.06 (1.5)	0.44 (11)	0.82 (21)	0.47 (12)	0.24 (6.1)	0.18 (4.6)	0.43 (11)	0.37 (9.4)

== History ==
Hell was founded by Charles Carr in 1954. In 1958 Carr, his wife, and their ten-year-old son Terry were the only inhabitants. Charles Carr served as the lone member of Hell's Chamber of Commerce.

Hell was abandoned in the late 1950s or early 1960s when it was isolated by the construction of U.S. Route 60 and U.S. 70. What was left in the area was demolished and burned by the California State Division of Highways in late 1964 to make way for what would eventually become Interstate 10. Before its demise, Hell had a service station, a beer tavern, and a good supply of drinking water.

== Popular culture ==
Occasionally Hell was referenced in the press, typically in relation to the weather:

- Columnist Art Ryon mentioned in his September 7, 1955, column in The Los Angeles Times that on September 1 it was 110 degrees in Los Angeles, yet only 105 degrees in Hell.
- On October 17, 1958, The Los Angeles Times published an article, LA's Hotter Than Hell--Only 97 There, when Los Angeles reached 104 degrees the same day.
- According to a UPI news report, it snowed in Hell at least once, causing many to remark, "it was a cold day in Hell".
- On 2015, an Interstate 10 bridge 9 miles from Hell collapsed, leading The Los Angeles Times to report that "It's not the pit of Hell, but it's close".

There were several roadside signs referencing Hell, including one near Indio, California, which read, "100 miles of desert ahead--right through Hell".

In her book, Riverside County, California, Placenames: Their Origins and Their Stories, Jane Davies Gunther said that Hell "was consigned to oblivion when the California State Highway Department bought it, rather than make an interchange for it, thus making it impossible for anyone to go to Hell in Riverside County".

A song entitled "Hell, Ca., Pop. 4" was featured on the 1990 album Blackout in the Red Room by Love/Hate.

== See also ==
- Hell, Michigan
- Hell, Norway
