= Skin (16volt album) =

Studio album by 16volt
- Released: January 13, 1994
- Recorded: Late 1993
- Studio: Various: Sound Impressions; (Portland, OR); The Litter Box; (Portland, OR)
- Genre: Industrial metal, industrial rock
- Length: 51:46
- Label: Re-Constriction
- Producer: Tony Lash; Eric Powell

16volt chronology
Wisdom (1993)	Skin (1994)	LetDownCrush (1996)

Skin is the second studio album by 16volt, released on January 13, 1994 by Re-Constriction Records.

== Reception ==
Professional ratings
Review scores
Source	Rating
AllMusic	2.5/5 stars

John Bush of AllMusic compared the band favorably to Skinny Puppy and said that "Skin has the same sinister vocals, raucous percussion and samples as Ogilvie's band." Aiding & Abetting called Skin "a stunning display of musical and creative power" and credited the live sound and diverse compositions as being the high points of the album." Sonic Boom praised Skin for "utiliz[ing] the guitar work to accentuate the music as opposed to detracting from the electronics and overpowering them" and that "16 Volt is the only other band besides Front Line Assembly who has successfully used guitars as the primary element of percussion in some of their music." CD Review gave the album and six out of six, praising the industrial style of the guitar performances.

== Track listing ==
All tracks are written by Eric Powell, Jeff Taylor and Von Vinhasa.

No.	Title	Length
1.	"Skin"	3:19
2.	"Perfectly Fake"	5:10
3.	"Uplift"	3:51
4.	"Slow Wreck"	4:47
5.	"Skin Graft"	2:41
6.	"Stitched"	4:45
7.	"Built to Last"	2:59
8.	"Bottle Rockets"	3:52
9.	"Downtime II"	4:19
10.	"Flick"	15:59

2012 Remastered
No.	Title	Remixer(s)	Length
11.	"Dead Skin" ("Skin" remix, hidden track at the end of "Flick" in original edition)		6:19
12.	"Girl, You'll Be a Woman Soon" (Neil Diamond cover)		4:35
13.	"Skin (Guitarless Mix)"	Hate Dept.	4:15
14.	"Turning Japanese" (The Vapors cover)		4:45
15.	"Stitched (Face-Rip)"	Hate Dept.	3:46

== Personnel ==
Adapted from the Skin liner notes.

16volt

- Eric Powell – lead vocals, sampler, synthesizer, programming, bass guitar, production, cover art, art direction
- Jeff Taylor – guitar, sampler, bass guitar, art direction
- Von Vinhasa – drums, percussion, programming

Addition performers

- Chris Carey – guitar

Production and design

- Keith "Fluffy" Auerbach – recording & mixing (5)
- Tony Lash – production, editing, mastering, mixing & recording (1–4, 6–10), synthesizer (9, 10), drums & percussion (8)

== Release history ==
Region	Date	Label	Format	Catalog
United States	1994	Re-Constriction	CD	REC-012
Germany	1995	Off Beat	CD	SPV 084
United States	2012	Metropolis	CD, DL	MET 773
