= Wisdom (16volt album) =

Studio album by 16volt
- Released: May 25, 1993
- Recorded: 1993
- Studio: Various: Chicago Trax; (Chicago, IL); White Horse; (Portland, OR)
- Genre: Industrial metal, industrial rock
- Length: 40:13
- Label: Re-Constriction
- Producer: Keith Auerbach; Dave Ogilvie; Eric Powell

16volt chronology
Wisdom (1993)	Skin (1994)

Wisdom is the debut studio album by 16volt, released on May 25, 1993, by Re-Constriction Records. It was produced with the aid of Skinny Puppy composer and musician Dave Ogilvie.

== Background ==
16 Volt sent a demo tape to college radio stations and caught the attention of future label owner and DJ Chase. From the band's demos, Chase petitioned Cargo Music to begin Re-Constriction Records and make Wisdom the label's third release. "Motorskills", which would become the first track on Wisdom, appeared on the compilation The Cyberflesh Conspiracy.

== Reception ==
Professional ratings
Review scores
Source	Rating
AllMusic	2.5/5 stars

John Bush of AllMusic says, "Skinny Puppy contributes a remix to Wisdom, which sounds much like the rest of the album." Aiding & Abetting said, "16 Volt combine great beats with a vicious intensity that crawls under your skin and proceeds to eat out your soul." Sonic Boom called Wisdom "nothing short of a spectacular display of craftsmanship and musical inspiration, "saying," the genius of Eric Powell is evident even on this first release in his ability to seamlessly mix guitar and harsh electronics in a way that neither seems to drown the other out." Option compared the album favorably to Nine Inch Nails, saying "the band's appeal lies in their blend of abrasive textures and relentless rhythms" while "the backbone of the songs is the rhythmic structure itself rather than cunningly concealed pop elements."

== Track listing ==
All tracks are written by Joel Bornzin, Jon Fell, Eric Powell and Jeff Taylor.

No.	Title	Length
1.	"Motorskill"	5:11
2.	"Wisdom"	4:04
3.	"Head of Stone"	5:10
4.	"Filthy Love of Fire"	5:21
5.	"Hand Over End"	4:15
6.	"Will"	4:58
7.	"Dreams of Light"	5:31
8.	"Downtime (Part One)"	5:43

2012 Remastered
No.	Title	Length
9.	"Dreams of Light" (Nightmare - Hate Dept. Remix)	4:57
10.	"Dreams of Light" (Quad - Hate Dept. Remix)	4:49
11.	"Filthy Love of Fire" (David Ogilvie Remix)	5:45
12.	"Black Hole"	5:25
13.	"Motorskill" (Demo Version)	5:28

== Personnel ==
Adapted from the Wisdom liner notes.

16volt

- Joel Bornzin – drums, percussion, programming
- Jon Fell – guitar
- Eric Powell – lead vocals, sampler, synthesizer, programming, bass guitar, cover art, art direction, production, mixing & recording (8)
- Jeff Taylor – bass guitar, sampler, art direction

Addition performers

- A.P. Boone – sampler, programming
- Chris Thomas – guitar

Production and design

- Animated Noise – cover art
- Keith "Fluffy" Auerbach – production, engineering, mixing (1, 3, 5, 7)
- SL Cohen – design, art direction
- Ryan Foster – mastering
- Tony Lash – editing, mastering, mixing & recording (1–4, 6–10)
- Dave Ogilvie – production, engineering, mixing (1, 2, 4, 6)

== Release history ==
Region	Date	Label	Format	Catalog
United States	1993	Re-Constriction	CD	REC-004
Germany	1995	Off Beat	CD	SPV 084
United States	2012	Metropolis	CD, DL	MET 772
