= SuperCoolNothing =

Studio album by 16volt
- Released: August 18, 1998
- Recorded: 1998
- Studio: Various: Mad Bus Studios; (Burbank, CA); Mad Dog Studios; (Burbank, CA); Scream Studios; (Studio City, Los Angeles, CA)
- Genre: Industrial metal, industrial rock
- Length: 49:36
- Label: Concrete/Slipdisc
- Producer: Joseph Bishara; Bill Kennedy; Eric Powell

16volt chronology
The Remix Wars: Strike 3 (1997)	SuperCoolNothing (1998)	Demography (2000)

SuperCoolNothing is the fourth studio album by 16volt, released on August 18, 1998 by Cargo and Re-Constriction Records. Two-thousand copies of the album were re-pressed by Dark City Music with new cover art and the first 100 copies signed by the band.

== Reception ==
Professional ratings
Review scores
Source	Rating
AllMusic	4/5 stars

Don Kline of AllMusic called SuperCoolNothing "a menacing album full of whisper-to-scream verses, explosive choruses, and brooding electronic soundscapes." He awarded the album four out of five stars, concluding that "in a genre where imitation is often the easiest path to commercial success, Eric Powell continues to concoct his own unique blend of industrial rock, punk, and metal." Last Sigh Magazine credited the larger budget with helping 16volt develop as artists, saying "there is a variation in styles that usually comes with relaxed studio time; one of the perks of a major record deal." Dana Bove placed SuperCoolNothing at number ten for CMJ's top reader choices of the month.

== Track listing ==
All tracks are written by Mike Peoples and Eric Powell.

No.	Title	Length
1.	"I Fail Truth"	3:25
2.	"Everyday Everything"	3:18
3.	"Don't Pray"	4:36
4.	"Keep Sleeping"	3:14
5.	"Moutheater"	5:30
6.	"Happy Pill"	4:13
7.	"The Enemy"	3:53
8.	"Machine Kit"	3:05
9.	"Low"	4:30
10.	"And I Go"	4:26
11.	"Dead Weight"	2:59
12.	"At the End"	5:55

2012 Remastered
No.	Title	Remixer(s)	Length
13.	"Happy Pill" (The Pharmacy Mix)	The Pharmacy	3:49
14.	"Low" (Filter Mix)	Filter	4:48
15.	"At the End" (Club Mix)	Paige Haley	4:25

== Personnel ==
Adapted from the SuperCoolNothing liner notes.

16volt

- Mike Peoples – guitar, bass guitar
- Eric Powell – lead vocals, guitar, programming, production, recording, design

Addition performers

- Joseph Bishara – programming, recording, production
- Krayge Tyler – guitar
- Chris Vrenna – live drums

Production and design

- Michaelynn Dreiling – photography
- Andrew Garver – mastering
- Bill Kennedy – production, recording, mixing
- Dave Hancock – engineering
- JK Potter – photography
- Rafael Serrano – engineering
- Steve Tushar – recording

== Release history ==
Region	Date	Label	Format	Catalog
United States	1998	Slipdisc	CD	008 633 134-2
Germany	1998	Concrete	CD	0084902CTR
United States	2000	Dark City Music	CD	DCMCD001
United States	2012	Metropolis	CD, DL	MET 775
