= 10 Ton Pressure =

EP by Chemlab
- Released: 1990
- Recorded: National Geographic's studios/"everywhere"
- Genre: Industrial
- Length: 18:47
- Label: Fifth Colvmn
- Producer: Hilary Bercovici; Joe Frank; Jared Louche; Dylan Thomas Moore

Chemlab chronology
10 Ton Pressure (1990)	Burn Out at the Hydrogen Bar (1993)

10 Ton Pressure is the debut EP of the industrial rock band Chemlab, released in 1990 by Fifth Colvmn Records. The duo of Dylan Thomas Moore and Joe Frank on synthesizers later teamed up with Jared Hendrickson (now known as Jared Louche) to create this EP. It was financed by Zalman Fishman, a nightclub owner who founded the now defunct Fifth Colvmn Records. Zalman became involved when he was introduced to Joe Frank through a mutual friend.

== Background ==
This release was recorded without permission at National Geographic's studios after hours and mixed in Los Angeles by Hilary Bercovici, a friend of Frank's. Dylan and Jared moved to New York City, where they continued Chemlab without Frank until the band's implosion in 1997. The EP showcased Moore's burgeoning talents, his aggressive, experimental programming and Jared Hendrickson's apocalyptic vision of the world. It was noisy yet hooky, the sound a mixture of Ministry, Front 242, Skinny Puppy and such first-wave industrial bands as SPK and Throbbing Gristle yet distinctly their own. It instantly struck a chord in the nascent American machine rock/industrial music scene and became an instant underground hit on dance floors across the country. Hendrickson's aggressive promotion ensured that the EP was reviewed in most of the music magazines and trade journals of the day and the first 1000 vinyl copies sold out very quickly. On the strength of excellent reviews and a strong buzz the band was asked to support Nine Inch Nails on their "Now I'm Nothing" tour in the winter of 1991. Moore wrote two songs specifically for that tour, 'Gas Mask' and 'X-Flipped' and although they performed them every night and they very much showed the harder and even more experimental direction the band would take on their subsequent albums, neither song was ever recorded. The tour was a smash success of sold-out shows that solidly planted Chemlab before the exploding underground scene.

=== Reissue ===
In 1994, the compilation album Magnetic Field Remixes was released and is essentially a reissue of this EP. The album includes all the songs found on this release, with some from the next album and one previously unreleased track. Some of the tracks found on the compilation have been remixed.

== Composition ==
The first chemlab release showcases a much more industrial sound, with far less guitar used and more unorganized and chaotic noises instrumentally. Small audio parts of this release's audio material can be heard on the next album, which seem to be recycled for usage on the suture instrumentals.

== Track listing ==
All tracks are written by Joe Frank, Jared Louche, Dylan Thomas Moore.

No.	Title	Length
1.	"Filament"	4:43
2.	"suture"	0:37
3.	"I Still Bleed"	3:57
4.	"Blunt Force Trauma"	3:32
5.	"Black Radio (In the Neon Blur)"	3:44
6.	"suture"	2:16

== Personnel ==
Adapted from the 10 Ton Pressure liner notes.

Chemlab

- Joe Frank – programming, production, engineering
- Jared Louche – lead vocals, production, engineering
- Dylan Thomas Moore – programming, production, engineering

Production and design

- Hilary Bercovici – production, engineering
- Aaron Falk – recording
- Greg Johnson – design
- Newton Moore – photography
- Zalman Fishman – executive-producer

== Release history ==
Region	Date	Label	Format	Catalog
United States	1990	Fifth Colvmn	CD	001
United States	1990	Future Disc	CD	
