= East Side Militia =

Studio album by Chemlab
- Released: October 8, 1996
- Studio: Chicago Trax Recording Studio (Chicago)
- Genre: Industrial rock, electronica
- Length: 45:13
- Label: Fifth Colvmn/Metal Blade
- Producer: Jeff "Critter" Newell; Jared Louche; Dylan Thomas Moore

Chemlab chronology
Magnetic Field Remixes (1994)	East Side Militia (1996)	Suture (2001)

Singles from East Side Militia
- 1. "Exile on Mainline" Released: 1996; 2. "Electric Molecular" Released: 1996

East Side Militia is the second studio album by American industrial rock band Chemlab, released on October 8, 1996 by Fifth Colvmn and Metal Blade Records. Its original title was supposed to be "Jesus Christ Porno Star" (which instead became the name of the second track of the album). It was re-released on November 30, 1999 by Martin Atkins' label Invisible Records with two additional tracks, "Vera Blue" remixed by PIG and "Exile on Mainline" remixed by haloblack.

== Composition ==
East Side Militia showcases the bands further progression past the widespread use of metal guitars from the last release. The release also leans more towards an electronica and industrial style, with more distortion instrumentally and vocally, including softer melodic parts in the compositions. The song "Jesus Christ Porno Star", a riff on Andrew Lloyd Webber's play of the approximate same name, is an innuendo aimed at the Christian religion.

== Reception ==
Professional ratings
Review scores
Source	Rating
Allmusic	4/5 stars

Aiding & Abetting called East Side Militia laden with "raging beats, accessible tunes and the attitude that is almost unmatched anywhere" and credited it along with the band's debut as "awesome industrial dance albums." Rick Anderson of AllMusic praised the band for being forerunners of their genre, saying "the band's 1996 swan song shows them to have been sonically prescient but a bit too nihilistic and vulgar for prime time." Sonic Boom criticized the album's length but commended the personal touches that vocalist Jared Louche brought to the lyrics and said "the music is what one would expect with the band taking so much time between releases, a diverse collection of thickly layered synthcore tracks coupled with a few slower swing style love songs." A critic at Option called the guitar performances by Geno Lenardo of Filter and William Tucker of Ministry brilliant. On the other hand, Scott Hefflon of Lollipop Magazine was largely negative towards the album, criticizing the writing for being dull and describing the music as "new blah-rock with misfiring artsy yearnings."

== Track listing ==
All tracks are written by Jared Louche, Dylan Thomas More and William Tucker, except "Latex" co-written with John DeSalvo and "Pyromance" by Geno Lenardo.

No.	Title	Length
1.	"Exile on Mainline"	4:34
2.	"Jesus Christ Porno Star"	6:24
3.	"Vera Blue (96/69)"	6:38
4.	"Pyromance"	4:04
5.	"Lo-Grade Fever"	5:22
6.	"Electric Molecular"	2:43
7.	"Latex"	4:01
8.	"Pink"	5:16
13.	"Exiled" ("Suck on This" Mix)	5:55

1999 reissue
No.	Title	Length
14.	"Vera Blue" (Remix)	10:07
15.	"Exile on Mainline" (Remix)	4:46

Notes
- Tracks 9–12 consist of four seconds of silence each

== Personnel ==
Adapted from the album's liner notes.

Chemlab

- Jared Louche – lead vocals, guitar, arrangements, production
- Dylan Thomas More – sampler, programming, arrangements, cover art, illustrations, production

Additional performers

- John DeSalvo – drums, programming, sampler, arrangements
- En Esch – sampler
- James Galus – turntables, remix (track 13)
- Amy Gorman – vocals (8)
- Marc LaCorte – sampler
- Geno Lenardo – guitar (4)
- Greg Lucas – sampler
- Solomon Snyder – bass guitar (5)
- Stella Soleil – vocals
- William Tucker – guitar (2, 3, 5–8)

Production and design

- 7S – design
- Zalman Fishman – executive producer
- Jeff "Critter" Newell – production

== Release history ==
Date	Region	Label	Format	Catalog
1996	United States	Fifth Colvmn/Metal Blade	CD, LP	3984-14115
1997	Poland	Metal Mind	CS	INDU 015
1999	United States	Invisible	CD	INV 157
