= Burn Out at the Hydrogen Bar =

Studio album by Chemlab
- Released: March 22, 1993
- Studio: Chicago Trax Recording Studio (Chicago, IL)
- Genre: Industrial rock, industrial metal
- Length: 43:00
- Label: Fifth Colvmn/Metal Blade
- Producer: Jeff "Critter" Newell; Jared Louche; Dylan Thomas Moore

Chemlab chronology
10 Ton Pressure (1990)	Burn Out at the Hydrogen Bar (1993)	Magnetic Field Remixes (1994)

Burn Out at the Hydrogen Bar is the debut studio album of industrial rock band Chemlab, released on March 22, 1993, by Fifth Colvmn and Metal Blade Records. It represents the band's only studio release via the label Metal Blade and was reissued by Invisible Records on November 30, 1999. Each "suture" is an instrumental piece splitting the main tracks apart. The track "Suicide Jag" was featured in the game Saints Row: The Third. The album was produced by Jeff "Critter" Newell and has been considered by critics to be a defining moment within the coldwave genre. In 2018 Chemlab embarked on a tour featuring Dead on TV and GoFight members Daniel Evans, Vince McAley, and Mike Love backing Louche to celebrate the twenty fifth anniversary of the Burn Out at the Hydrogen Bar. On June 18, 2021, a remaster of the album was released.

== Reception ==
Professional ratings
Review scores
Source	Rating
AllMusic	4/5 stars

Aiding & Abetting gave Burn Out at the Hydrogen Bar a mixed to positive review, commending the guitar work and calling the music "user-friendly industrial dance stuff." Rick Anderson of AllMusic awarded the album four out of five stars and said "the band's debut album reveals a group lurching toward tightly controlled sonic pandemonium while still maintaining a firm grip on old-fashioned, blippy, synth riffs and the occasional shred of actual melody." Sonic Boom described Chemlab as "one of the few true industrial rock bands" and "buried deep under the surface of music are influences so diverse and spread out that one would wonder why this particular fusion of decayed guitars and hybrid electronics would be the music of choice of this east coast duo."

== Sampling ==
The opening spoken‑word sample in the track "Neurozone" has been linked to the 1990 documentary Cyberpunk, directed by Marianne Trench, which features psychologist and writer Timothy Leary. The sample appears approximately 10:22 into the documentary with Leary saying "In the bureaucracy, any individual that thinks for herself is considered a hooligan, or a smartass, or a know‑it‑all, or a troublemaker"

== Track listing ==
All lyrics are written by Jared Louche; all music is composed by Dylan Thomas More, except "Suicide Jag" co-written with Mark Kermanj and "Rivet Head" co-written with Mark Kermanj and Steve Watson.

No.	Title	Length
1.	"suture"	0:38
2.	"Codeine, Glue and You"	4:45
3.	"Suicide Jag"	4:50
4.	"suture"	0:10
5.	"Chemical Halo"	4:50
6.	"Neurozone"	5:57
7.	"Elephant Man"	4:10
8.	"suture"	1:12
9.	"Rivet Head"	3:51
10.	"Derailer"	5:05
11.	"suture"	0:18
12.	"Summer of Hate"	6:46
13.	"suture"	0:27

1999 Reissue
No.	Title	Length
14.	"Chemical Halo" (Remix)	5:05
15.	"Suicide Jag" (Remix)	5:14

== Personnel ==
Adapted from the Burn Out at the Hydrogen Bar liner notes.

Chemlab

- Jared Louche – lead vocals, arrangements, production, art direction, additional programming (3, 9)
- Dylan Thomas More – sampler, programming, loops, arrangements, production, art direction, additional programming (3, 9)

Additional performers

- Martin Atkins – remix (14)
- Mark Blasquez – remix (15)
- Mark Kermanj – drums
- Geno Lenardo – sampler (3)
- Ned Wahl – bass guitar
- Steve Watson – guitar

Production and design

- Duane Buford – assistant engineering
- Eric Carter – assistant engineering
- Bill Garcelon – assistant engineering
- Zalman Fishman – executive-producer
- Matthias Heilbronn – editing
- Phil Merkle – cover art, art direction
- Newton More – photography
- Jeff "Critter" Newell – production
- Scott Larson – assistant engineering
- Geno Lenardo – assistant engineering
- Dalton Portella – art direction
- Brett Smith – design

== Release history ==
Date	Region	Label	Format	Catalog
1993	United States	Fifth Colvmn/Metal Blade	CD, CS	3984-14013
1993	United States	Devotion/Fifth Colvmn/Metal Blade	CD	004
1999	United States	Invisible	CD	INV 160
