= 16volt =

American industrial rock band

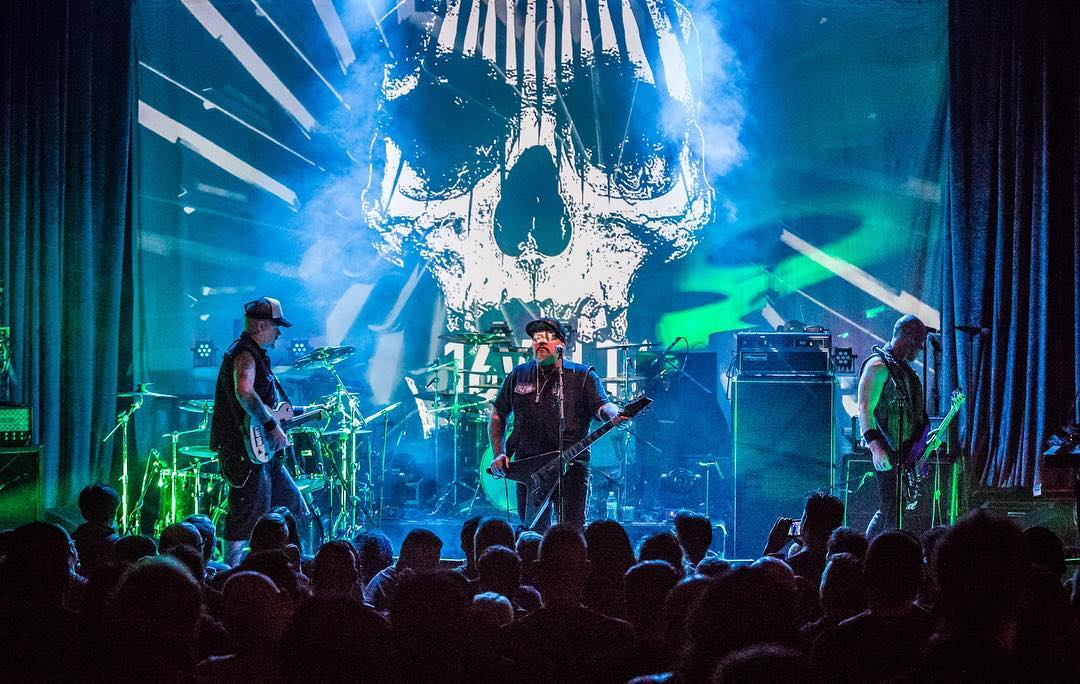
- 16volt in 2017

Background information
- Origin: Portland, Oregon (early); Los Angeles, California (after)
- Genres: Industrial rock; industrial metal
- Years active: 1988–present
- Labels: Re-Constriction, Metropolis
- Members: Eric Powell; John "Servo" DeSalvo; "Mindcage" Rick Furr; Jim Semonik
- Past members: Jason Bazinet; Steve Hickey; Joel Bornzin; Jon Fell; Marc Jordan; Marc LaCorte; Mike Peoples; Jeff Taylor; Von Vinhasa; Steve White
- Website: www.16volt.com

16volt is an American industrial rock band formed by Eric Powell, with other performers added for live shows. The current lineup consists of Powell on vocals, John "Servo" DeSalvo on drums, "Mindcage" Rick Furr on guitars, and Jim Semonik on keyboards.

== History ==
16volt was formed in Portland, Oregon by composer and vocalist Eric Powell. Powell recruited musicians drummer Joel Bornzin, guitarist Jon Fell and Jeff Taylor to record "Motorskill", which debuted on The Cyberflesh Conspiracy various artist compilation by If It Moves... That band released their first full-length studio album Wisdom on May 25, 1993, after signing to Re-Constriction Records. The album received critical attention for its industrial-informed beats and abrasive electronic textures. The band continued to issue albums via Re-Constriction for the next three albums: Skin (1994), LetDownCrush (1996), and SuperCoolNothing (1998).

The band is featured in the opening scene of video game Primal, and contributed nine songs to the game's soundtrack.

16volt released its fifth album titled FullBlackHabit in 2007 for Metropolis Records. The band followed that release with two more studio albums for Metropolis, American Porn Songs and Beating Dead Horses, which were released in 2009 and 2011 respectively. 16volt self-released the 2016 album The Negative Space on their label Murder Creek. Dead on Arrivals was self-released for Murder Creek in 2017, whereas 16volt went on a hiatus afterwards.

Powell reactivated 16volt in 2024, releasing Negative on Arrivals, which combined various tracks from The Negative Space and Dead on Arrivals in order to give them a wider distribution. It was followed by the announcement of a proper studio album for 2025, titled More of Less. More of Less was eventually released on July 25, 2025 on the Metropolis Records label.

== Discography ==
Studio albums

- Wisdom (1993, Re-Constriction)
- Skin (1994, Re-Constriction)
- LetDownCrush (1996, Re-Constriction)
- SuperCoolNothing (1998, Re-Constriction)
- FullBlackHabit (2007, Metropolis)
- American Porn Songs (2009, Metropolis)
- Beating Dead Horses (2011, Metropolis)
- The Negative Space (2016, Murder Creek)
- Dead on Arrivals (2017, Murder Creek)
- More of Less (2025, Metropolis)

Remix albums

- The Remix Wars: Strike 3 – 16 Volt vs. Hate Dept (1996, 21st Circuitry)
- American Porn Songs: Remixed (2010, Metropolis)

Compilation albums

- Demography (2000, Cleopatra)
- SuperCoolNothing V2.0 (2002, Dark City Music)
- The Best of Sixteen Volt (2005, Cleopatra)
- Negative on Arrivals (2024, Metropolis)

Singles

- "The Dreams That Rot in Your Heart" (1996, Re-Constriction)
