= Chemlab =

American industrial rock band

- Origin: Washington D.C., U.S.
- Genre: Industrial rock
- Years active: 1989–1997, 2004–2012, 2018–2022
- Labels: Invisible; Fifth Colvmn; Metal Blade
- Members: Jared Louche (Hendrickson); Mike Love; Daniel Evans; Vince McAley
- Past members: Marc Plastic (Oliver); Giorgia; Jason Basinet; Wade Alin; Phil DiSiena; Dylan Thomas More; Joe Frank
- Website: Chemlab on Facebook

Chemlab is an American industrial rock band formed in Washington D.C. in 1989 by Dylan Thomas More, Joe Frank, and Jared Louche (then known as Hendrickson). Influenced by the pioneers of the industrial genre, such as Throbbing Gristle, Chemlab mixed experimental sounds with rock and metal within an electronic framework. They released their first EP 10 Ton Pressure (1990), parted ways with Frank and moved to New York City, their base for the duration of their career. Chemlab released their debut album Burn Out at the Hydrogen Bar in 1993 and toured with acts such as White Zombie, KMFDM, Nine Inch Nails, 16volt, and Gwar.

== History ==
=== Initial releases (1990–2004) ===
Chemlab's first release was the EP 10 Ton Pressure, in 1990. Chemlab toured as opening acts for Nine Inch Nails from 1990 to 1991 for the Sin tour, which was a part of the greater Pretty Hate Machine Tour . After releasing the albums Burn Out at the Hydrogen Bar (1993) and East Side Militia (1996) on Fifth Colvmn Records, Chemlab broke up in 1997 and then later reformed in 2004 to release an album titled Oxidizer with Jared as the only original member.

=== Intermittent touring (2004–2012) ===
After a seven-year hiatus from the stage, Jared recreated Chemlab and, with a backing band composed of the members of electro-industrial group mindFIELD performed a one-off show in Boston, Massachusetts in August 2005. The band played another one-off show, this time in New York City on January 7, 2006. A third show in San Francisco on March 17, 2006, saw the band joined by fellow coldwave bands Babyland and Deathline International.

The band played at the Detroit Electronic Music Festival and the Blacksun Festival. In late 2007, the band toured the US for the first time in eight years, with the supporting line-up of multi-instrumentalist/programmer Gabriel Shaw (mindFIELD), Wade Alin (Christ Analogue) and Jason Bazinet (SMP).

During the spring of 2010, Chemlab toured North America with 16volt and Left Spine Down.

Jared Louche announced on stage during a performance on September 7, 2012 in Chicago, that it would be the band's final show.

=== Later years (2012–present) ===
In the spring of 2018, it was announced that Chemlab would return for Cold Waves VII in Chicago, New York and Los Angeles to perform Burn Out at the Hydrogen Bar in its entirety to commemorate the 25th anniversary of the album's release. The band also performed at Cold Waves VIII, along with a number of other standalone shows. The band later released the compilation Tape Decay in 2019. This release includes unreleased tracks from the East Side Militia, Burn Out at the Hydrogen Bar and 10 Ton Pressure cassette demos as well as new songs. The band performed at the Oriental Theater in Denver with Pop Will Eat Itself and Scifidelic from September 21 to 22, 2019.

Dylan Thomas More died on January 4, 2025.

== Other past members and contributing artists ==
- John "Servo" DeSalvo (16 Volt/KMFDM/Bile)
- Mark Kermanj
- Geno Lenardo (Filter)
- Charles Levi (My Life with the Thrill Kill Kult)
- Greg Lucas (The Final Cut)
- James McAndrew (Milquetoast & Co.)
- Regan Miller (mindFIELD)
- Gabriel Shaw (mindFIELD)
- William Tucker
- Kraig Tyler (16 Volt/Crazy Town)
- Ned Wahl (The Deadly Nightshades)
- F.J. DeSanto (The Aggression, Hypefactor)
- members of Acumen Nation
- Steve Watson
- Paula "Shark" Wood
- Prosthetic Hands

== References in popular culture ==
- In the 1995 movie 12 Monkeys, a Chemlab poster can be seen during an exterior shot of a sidewalk and building.
- In the Aerosmith video for "Amazing", a similar Chemlab poster can be seen at the end of the video.
- In season 3, episode 1 of MTV's The State opening sketch, a Chemlab / Sister Machine Gun Psych Fest poster hangs above Michael Ian Black's bed.

== Discography ==
=== Studio albums ===
- Burn Out at the Hydrogen Bar (1993)
- East Side Militia (1996)
- Oxidizer (2004)

=== Compilation albums ===
- Suture (2001)
- Tape Decay (2019)

=== Remix albums ===
- Rock Whore vs. Dance Floor (2006)

=== EPs ===
- Ten Ton Pressure (1990)
- Magnetic Field Remixes (1994)
- The Machine Age (2003)

=== Singles ===
- "Exile on Mainline" (1996)
- "Electric Molecular" (1996)
