= Jared Louche =

American singer (born 1960)

- Born: Jared Hendrickson; December 11, 1960 (age 65); Los Angeles, California, United States
- Genre: Industrial rock
- Occupation: Musician
- Instrument: Vocals
- Years active: 1984–present

Jared Louche (born Jared Hendrickson; December 11, 1960) is an American musician best recognized as the front-man of industrial rock outfit Chemlab. He also founded the band H3llb3nt and has collaborated with Pigface, Progrex.iv and Vampire Rodents. He released a solo album, titled Covergirl in 1999.

== Biography ==
In July 1984, Jared Hendrickson and Tom Smith formed Peach of Immortality. They released a handful of demo recordings before disbanding in 1991. Louche formed Chemlab with Dylan Thomas More and Joe Frank in 1989. The band released the albums Burn Out at the Hydrogen Bar (1993) and East Side Militia (1996) on Fifth Colvmn Records. He also formed H3llb3nt, a supergroup comprising himself, Bryan Barton, Charles Levi, Jordan Nogood and Eric Powell. After Chemlab dissolved in 1997, Louche found himself deep in debt and began working as an investment banker on Wall Street. He took a two-year hiatus from music and returned in 1999 with his solo debut album Covergirl.
