= List of female rock singers =

This is a list of female rock singers. For female heavy metal singers, see List of female heavy metal singers.

== A ==
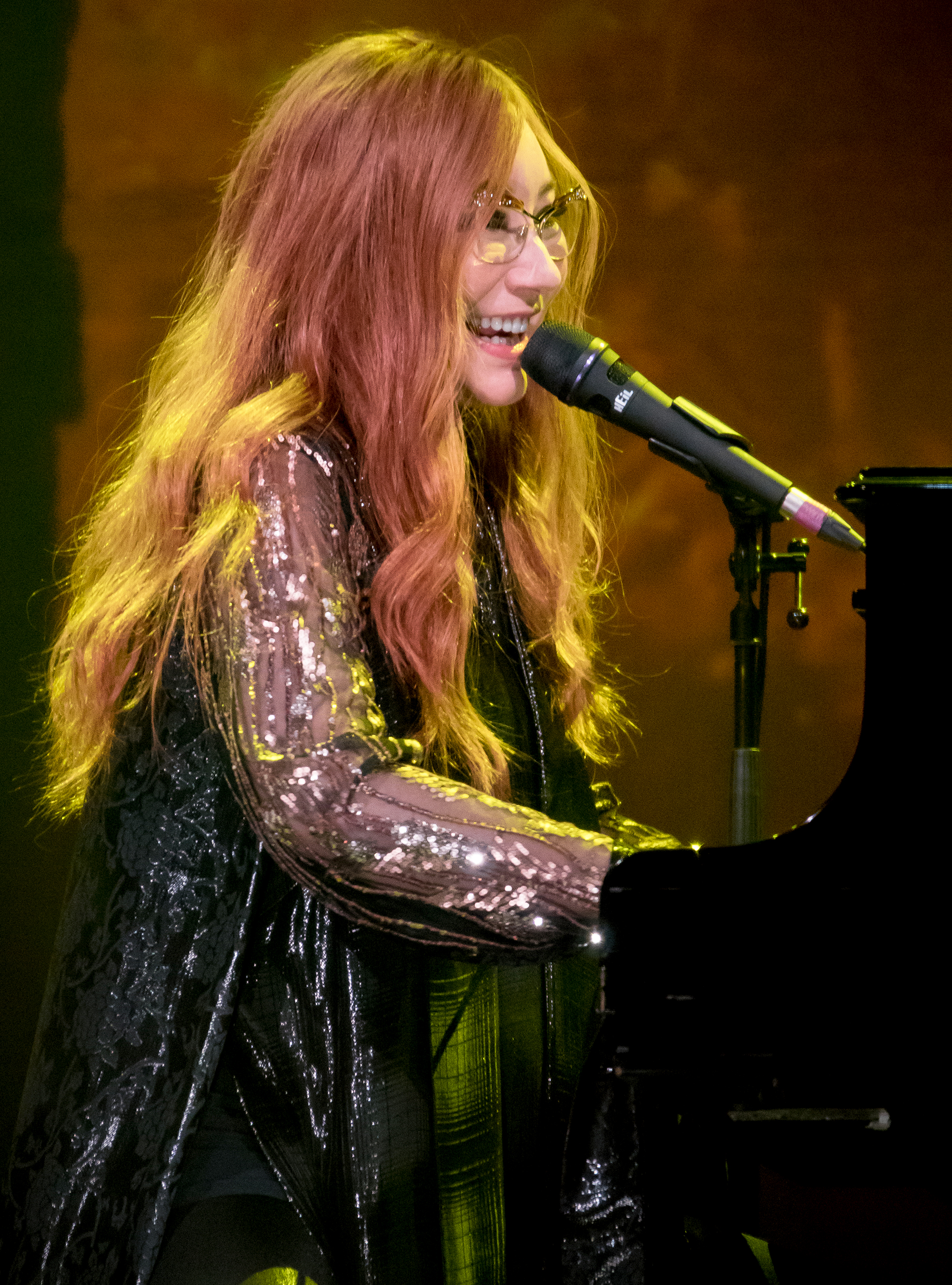
Tori Amos

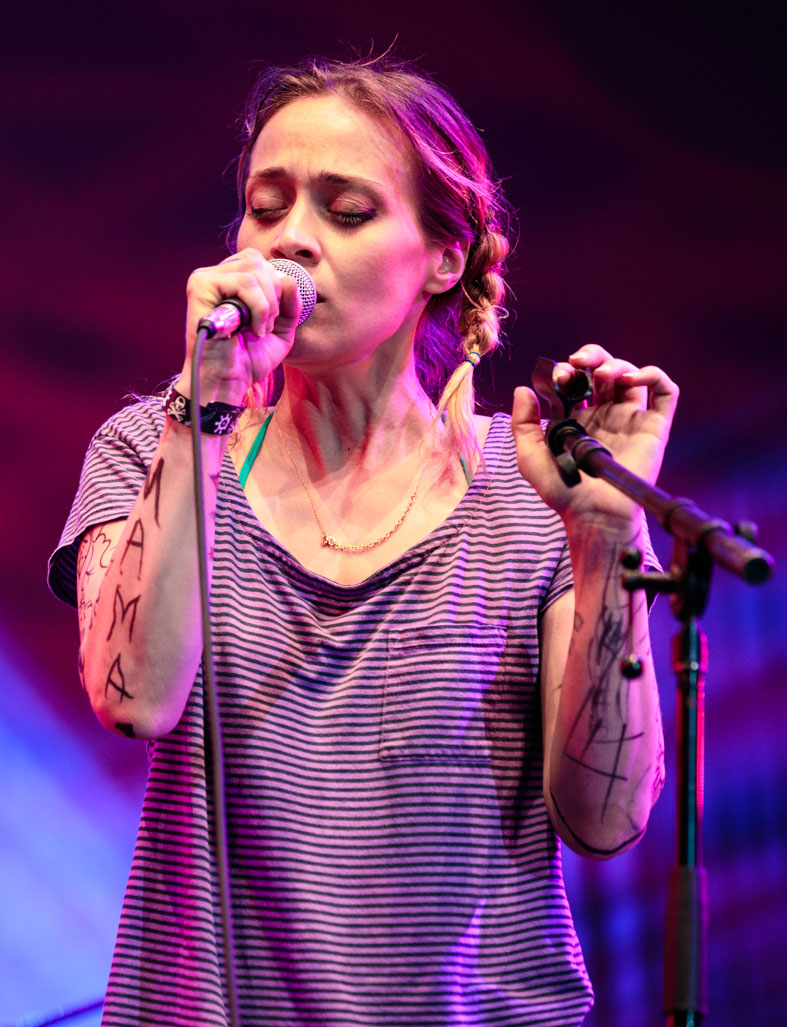
Fiona Apple

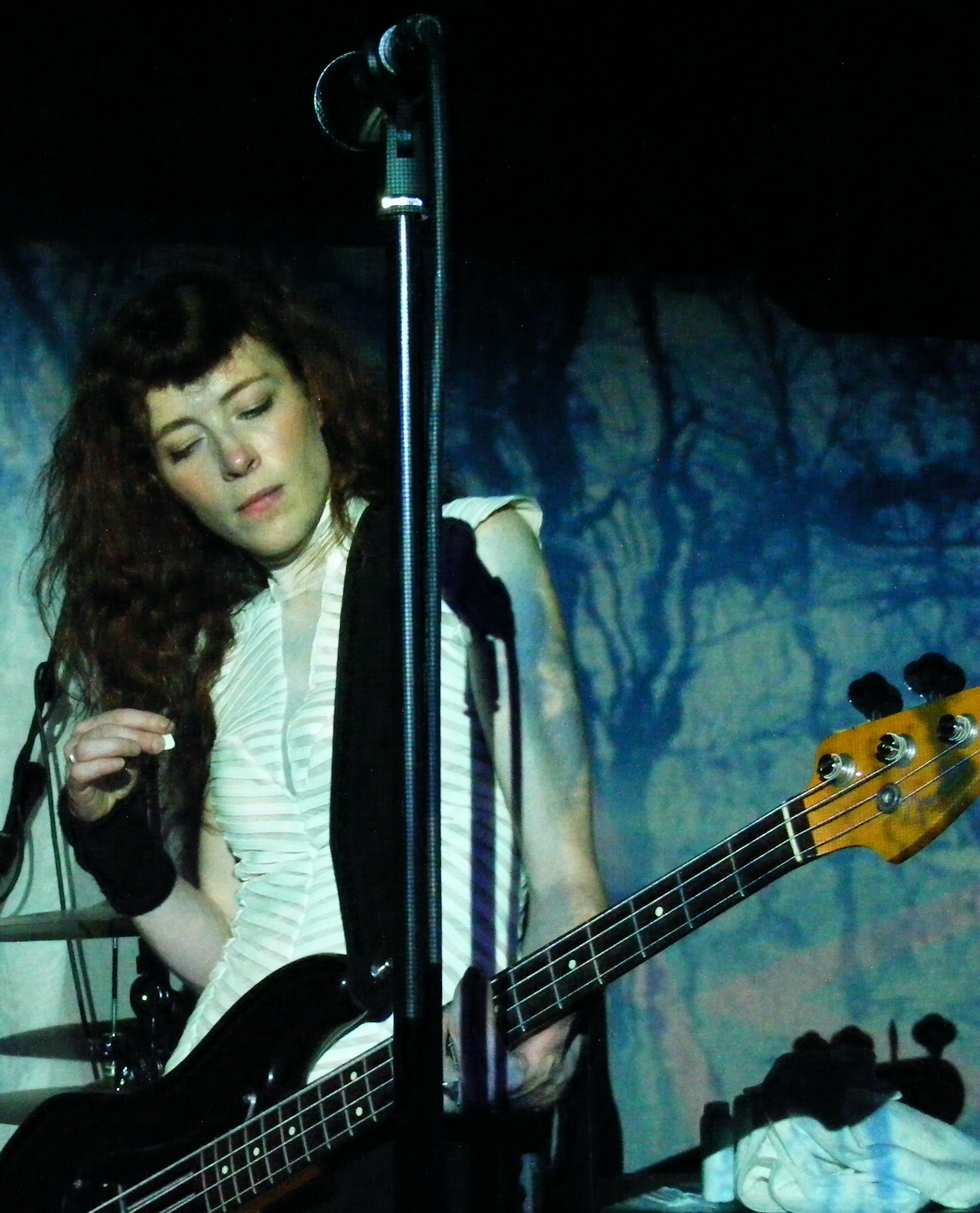
Melissa Auf der Maur

- Lee Aaron
- Pearl Aday
- Sharon den Adel (Within Temptation)
- Agent M (Tsunami Bomb)
- Zhanna Aguzarova
- Nanase Aikawa
- Zayra Alvarez
- Eva Amaral
- Amber
- Vanessa Amorosi
- Tori Amos
- Christina Amphlett (Divinyls)
- Diana Anaid
- Emma Anderson (Lush)
- Brett Anderson (The Donnas)
- Laurie Anderson
- Signe Toly Anderson (Jefferson Airplane)
- Anouk
- Sarah Anthony (The Letter Black)
- Fiona Apple
- Tasmin Archer
- Joan Armatrading
- Emily Armstrong (Dead Sara, Linkin Park)
- Stephanie Ashworth (Something for Kate)
- Aylin Aslim
- Nicole Atkins
- Melissa Auf der Maur (Auf der Maur, Hole)
- Caroline Azar (Fifth Column)

== B ==
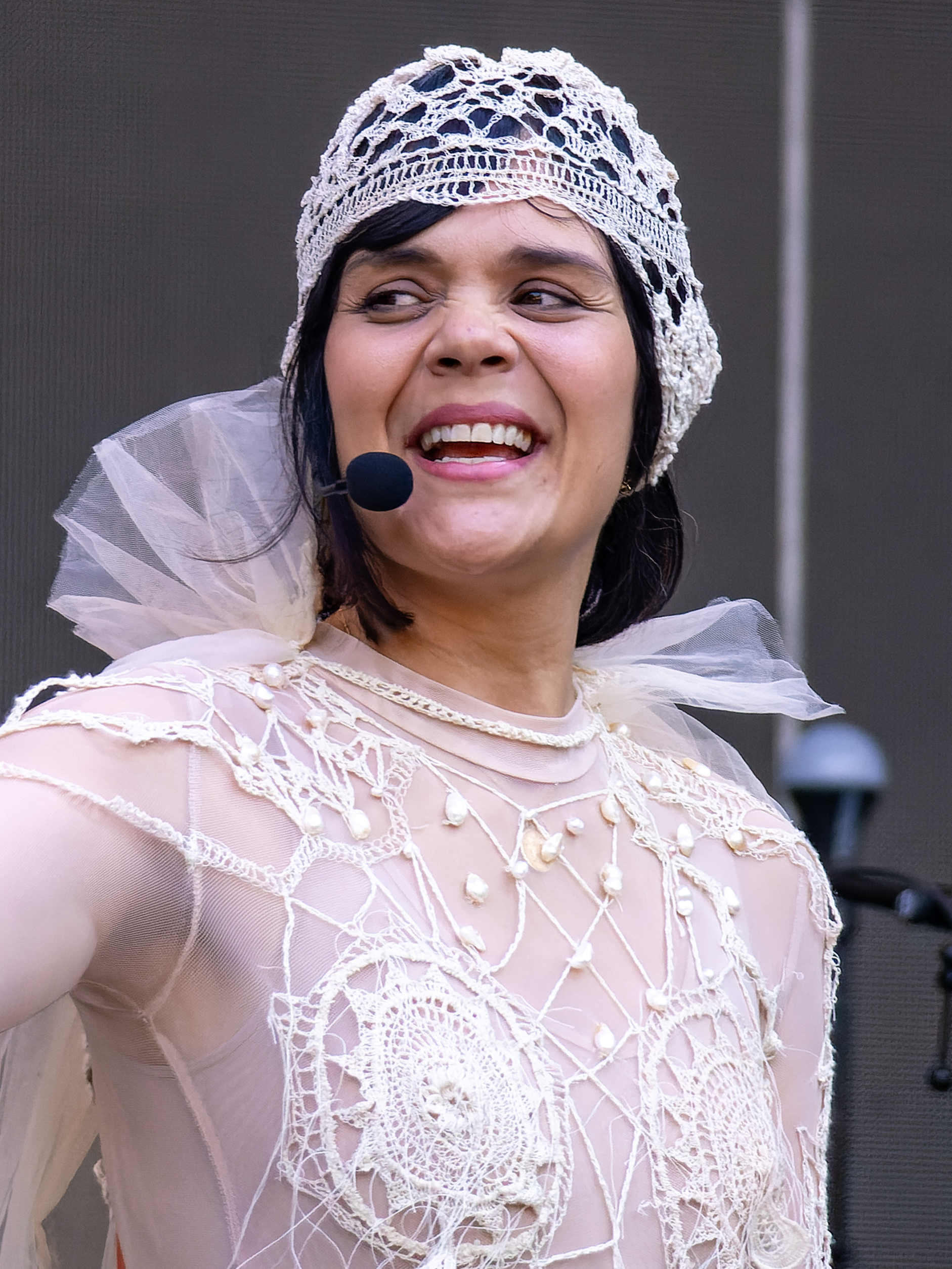
Bat for Lashes

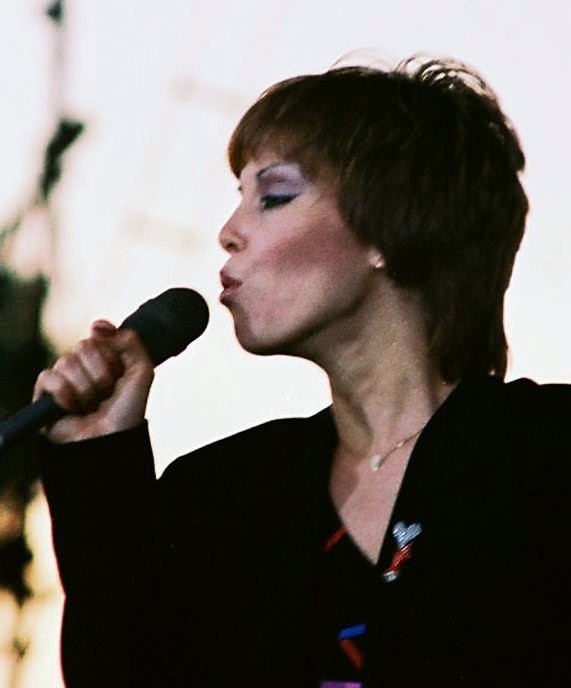
Pat Benatar

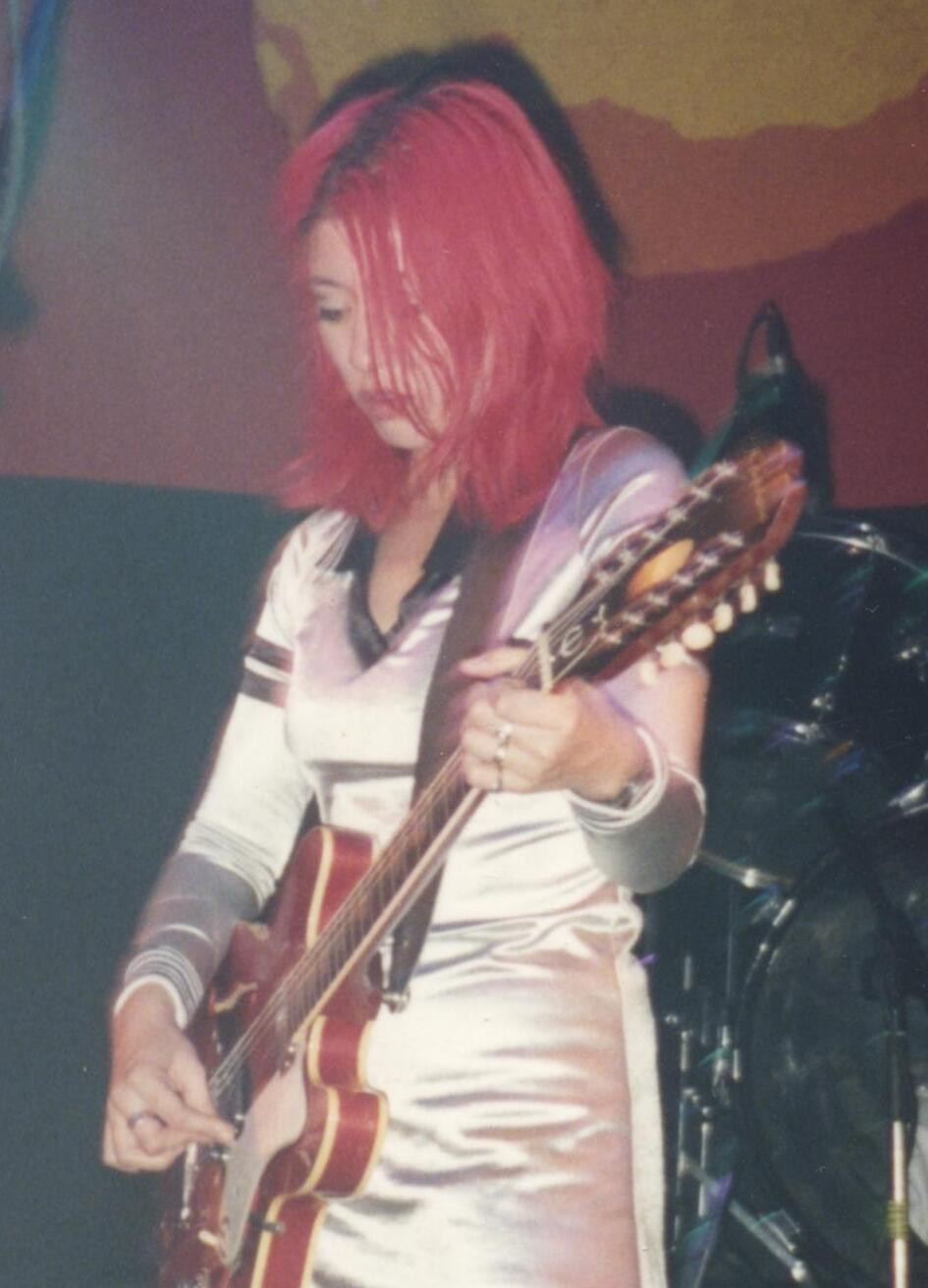
Miki Berenyi

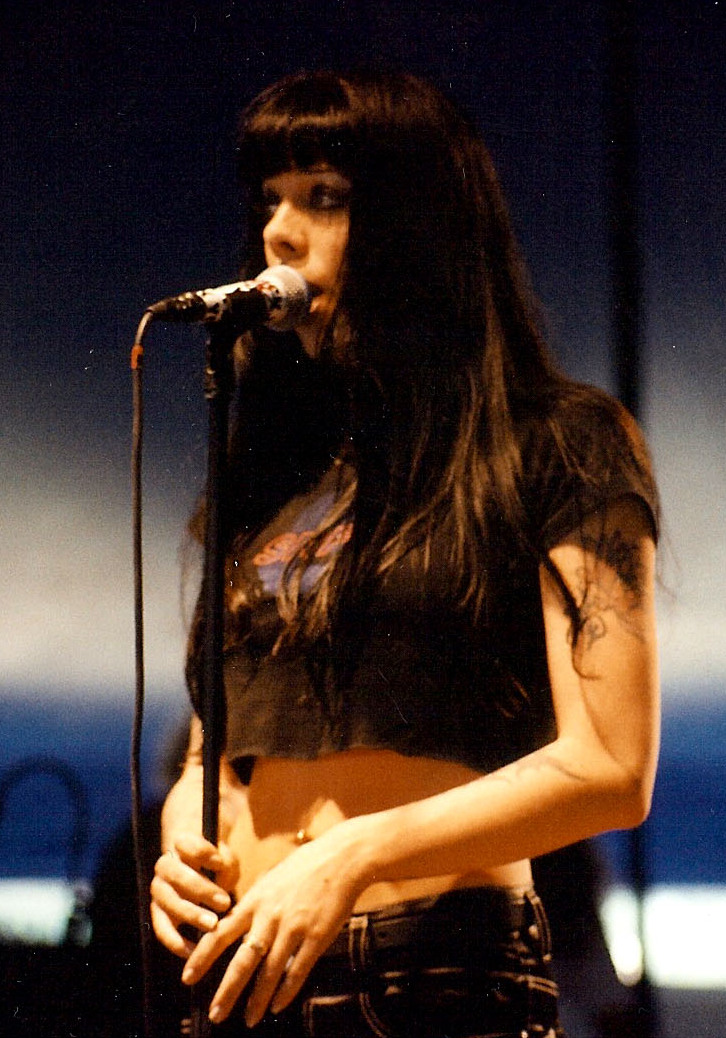
Bif Naked

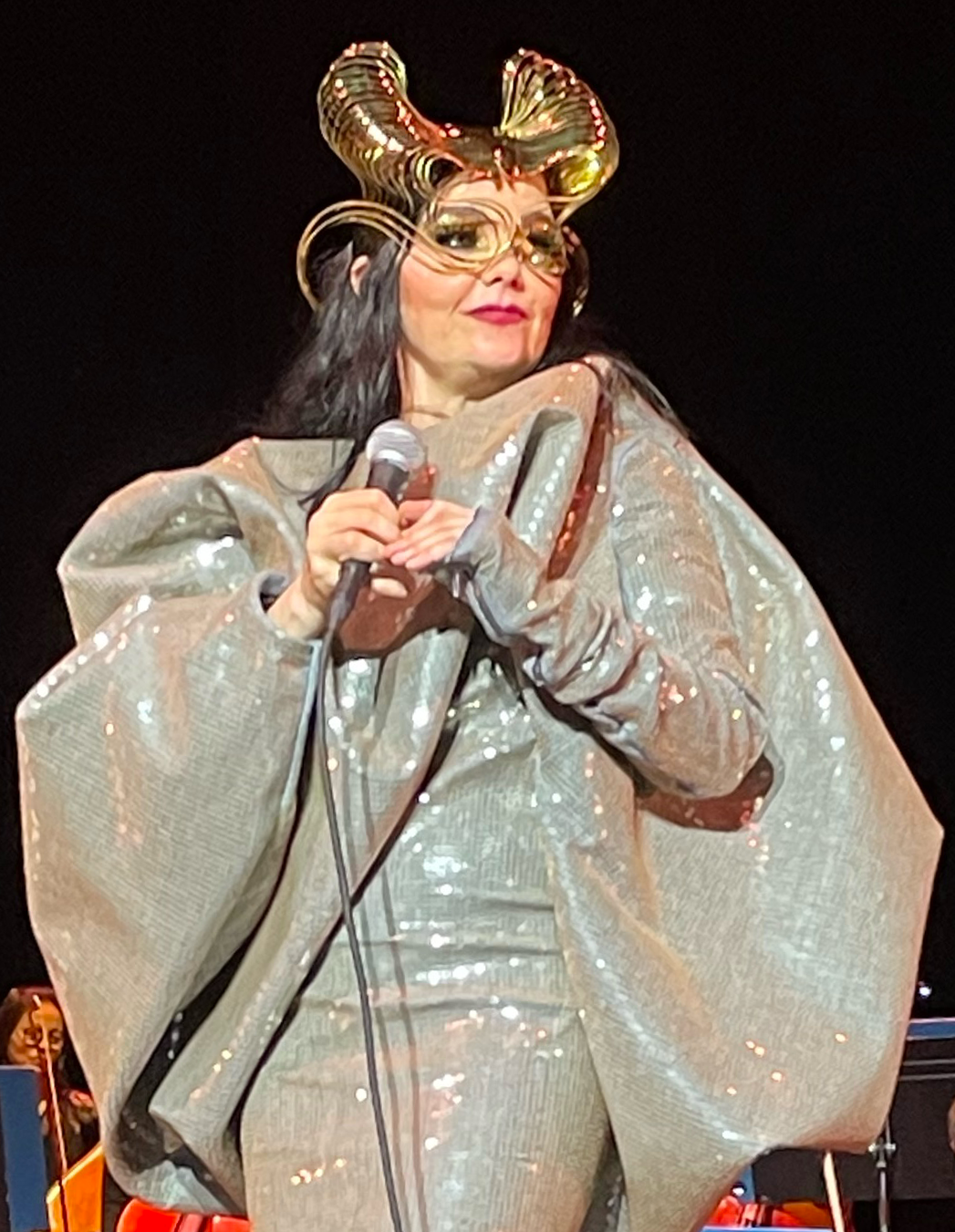
Björk

- Joan Baez
- Alice Bag (Bags, Castration Squad)
- Jessica Bailiff
- LaVern Baker
- Honey Bane
- Sara Bareilles
- Courtney Barnett
- Niki Barr
- Edyta Bartosiewicz
- Becca (Stars in Stereo)
- Robin Beck
- Pat Benatar
- Miki Berenyi (Lush)
- Cia Berg (Whale)
- Elizabeth "Z" Berg (The Like)
- Marilina Bertoldi (Connor Questa)
- Sarah Bettens (K's Choice)
- Bif Naked
- Christina Billotte (Autoclave, Slant 6)
- Kat Bjelland (Babes in Toyland, Crunt, Katastrophy Wife)
- Björk (The Sugarcubes)
- Pauline Black (The Selecter)
- Porcelain Black (Porcelain and the Tramps)
- Jody Bleyle (Team Dresch)
- Beki Bondage (Vice Squad)
- Tracy Bonham
- Christina Booth (Magenta)
- Marie-Mai Bouchard
- Patti Boulaye
- Crystal Bowersox
- Carla Bozulich (Ethyl Meatplow, Geraldine Fibbers)
- Dale Bozzio (Missing Persons)
- Bonnie Bramlett
- Michelle Branch
- Laura Branigan
- Edie Brickell (Edie Brickell & New Bohemians)
- Phoebe Bridgers (boygenius)
- Eva Briegel (Juli)
- Bette Bright (Deaf School)
- Maria Brink (In This Moment)
- Charmaine Brooks
- Elkie Brooks
- Meredith Brooks
- Terri Brosius (Tribe)
- Pip Brown (Ladyhawke)
- Ruth Brown
- V V Brown
- Carrie Brownstein (Excuse 17, Sleater-Kinney)
- Nanna Bryndís Hilmarsdóttir (Of Monsters and Men)
- Tahita Bulmer (New Young Pony Club)
- Anna Burley (The Killjoys)
- Megan Burns (a.k.a. Betty Curse)
- Kate Bush
- Bilinda Butcher (My Bloody Valentine)

== C ==
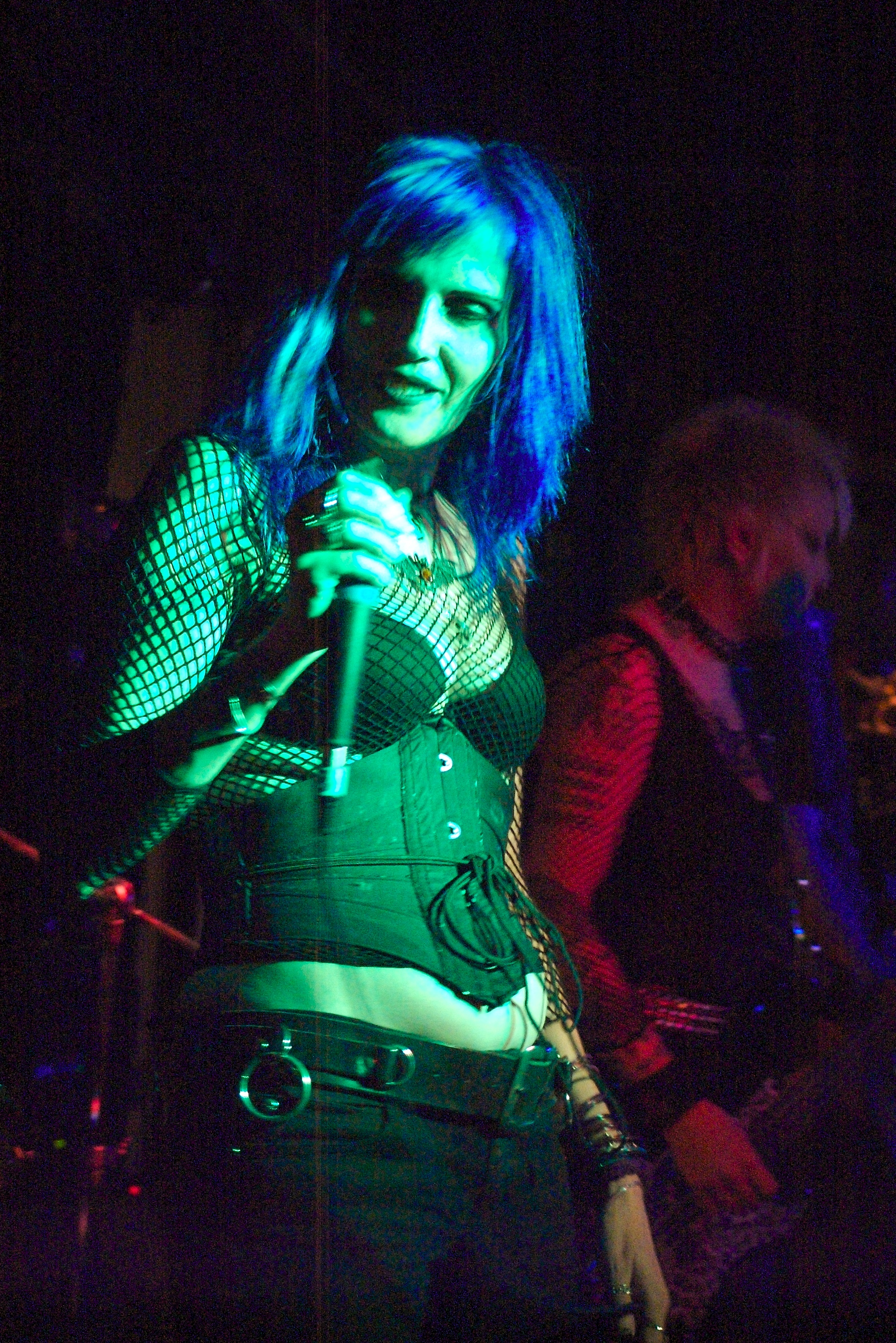
Dinah Cancer

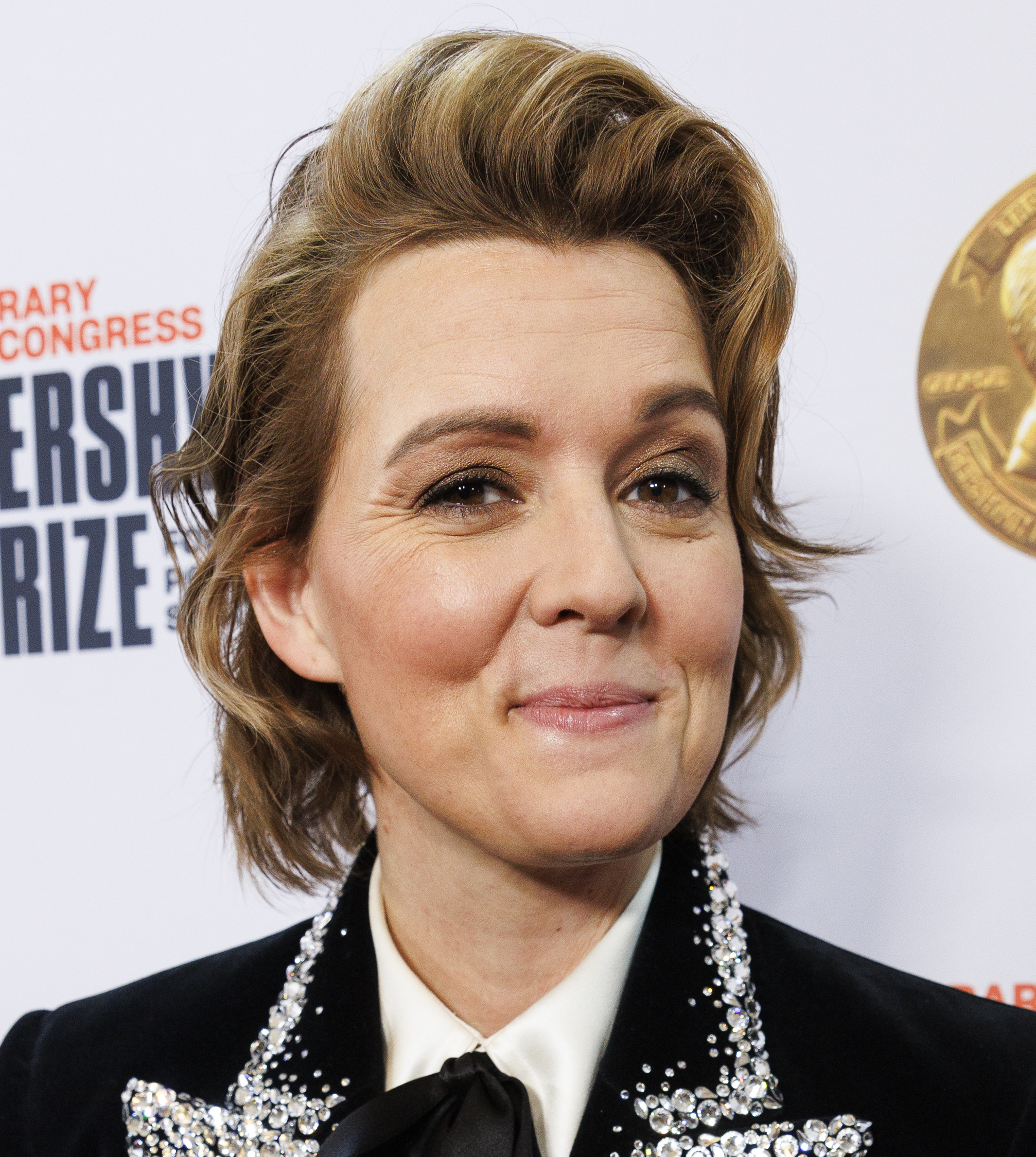
Brandi Carlile

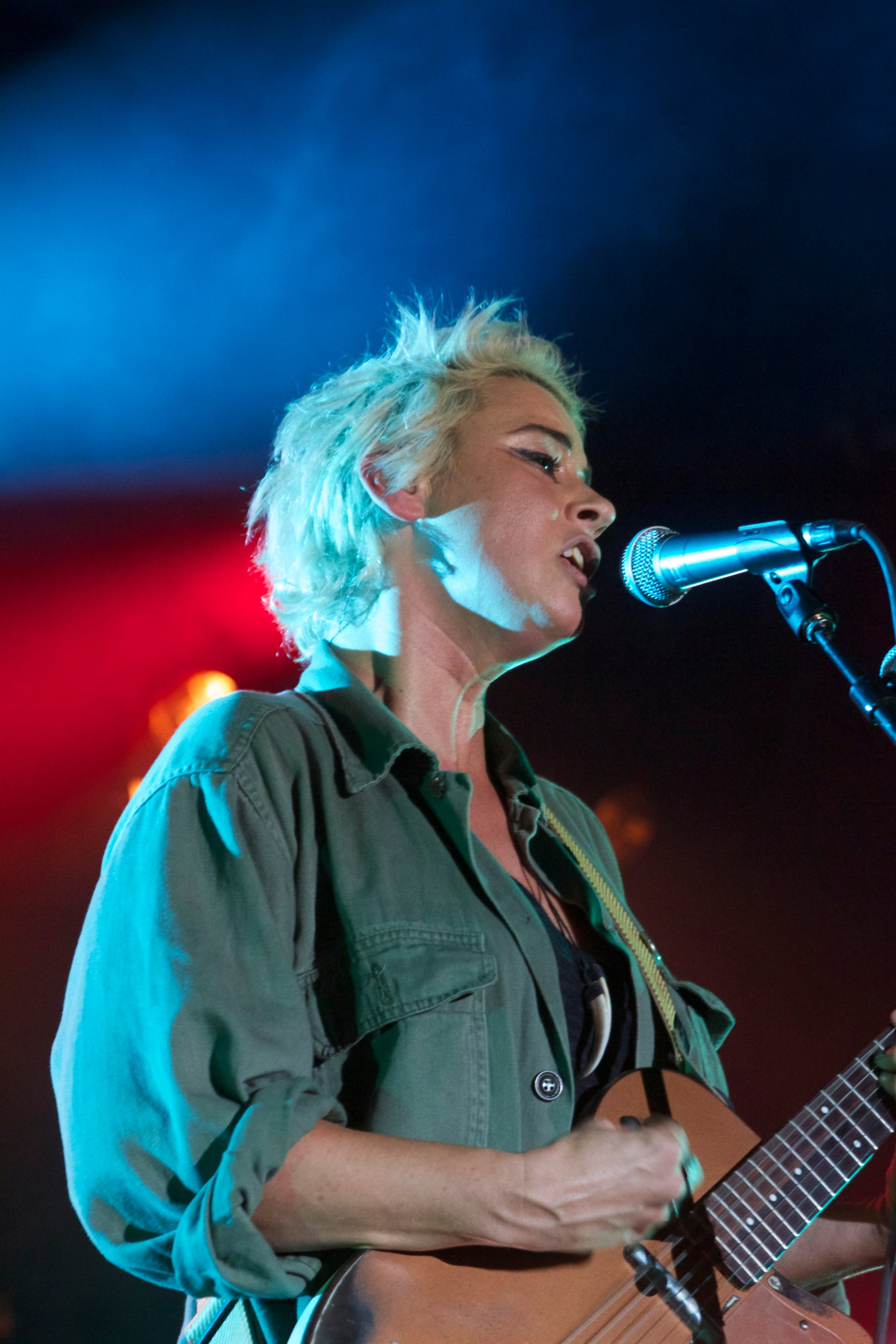
Cat Power

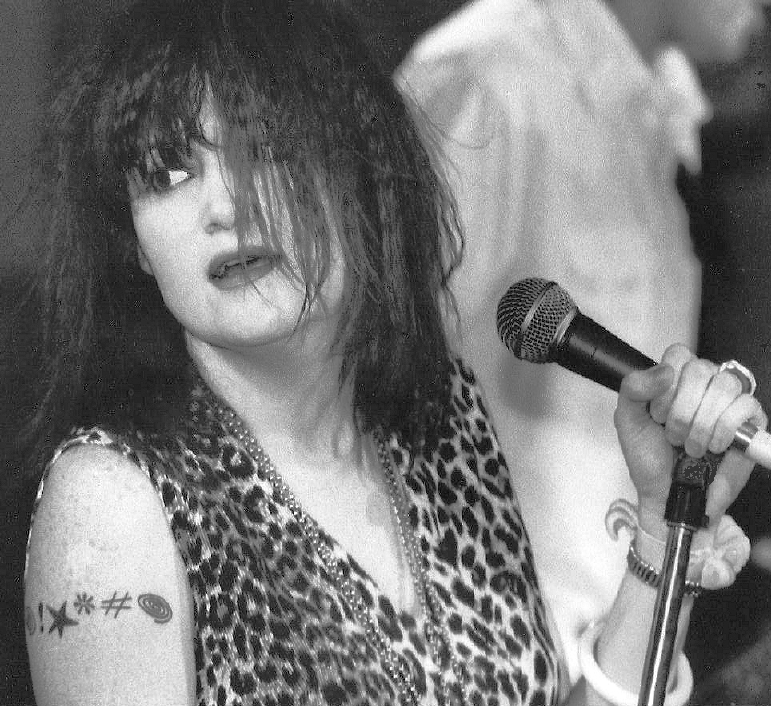
Exene Cervenka

- Kathryn Calder (Immaculate Machine, The New Pornographers)
- Alexx Calise
- Dinah Cancer (45 Grave, Dinah Cancer and the Grave Robbers)
- Belinda Carlisle (The Go-Go's)
- Vanessa Carlton
- Kim Carnes
- Rachel Carns (The Need, King Cobra)
- Karen Carpenter (The Carpenters)
- Lisa Crystal Carver (Suckdog)
- Neko Case (The New Pornographers, Maow)
- Cassidy (Antigone Rising)
- Alexandra Căpitănescu
- Exene Cervenka (X, Original Sinners)
- Tracy Chapman
- Cher
- Toni Childs
- Jennifer Charles (Elysian Fields)
- Carah Faye Charnow (Shiny Toy Guns)
- Régine Chassagne (Arcade Fire)
- Alisa Childers (ZOEgirl)
- Melanie Chisholm (Melanie C)
- Agnieszka Chylińska (O.N.A.)
- Madonna Louise Ciccone (Madonna)
- Chantal Claret (Morningwood)
- Annie Clark (St. Vincent)
- Kelly Clarkson
- Daisy Coburn (Daisy Dares You)
- Lisa Coleman (Wendy & Lisa)
- Chi Coltrane
- Andrea Corr (The Corrs)
- Sharon Corr (The Corrs)
- Bethany Cosentino (Best Coast)
- Nikka Costa
- Chrissy Costanza (Against the Current)
- Josie Cotton
- Jayne County
- Sarah Cracknell (Saint Etienne)
- Beverley Craven
- Melora Creager (Rasputina)
- Sheryl Crow
- Allison Crowe
- Julia Cumming (Sunflower Bean)
- Alannah Currie (Thompson Twins, Babble)
- Cherie Currie (The Runaways, Cherie & Marie Currie)
- Marie Currie (Cherie & Marie Currie)
- Miley Cyrus

== D ==
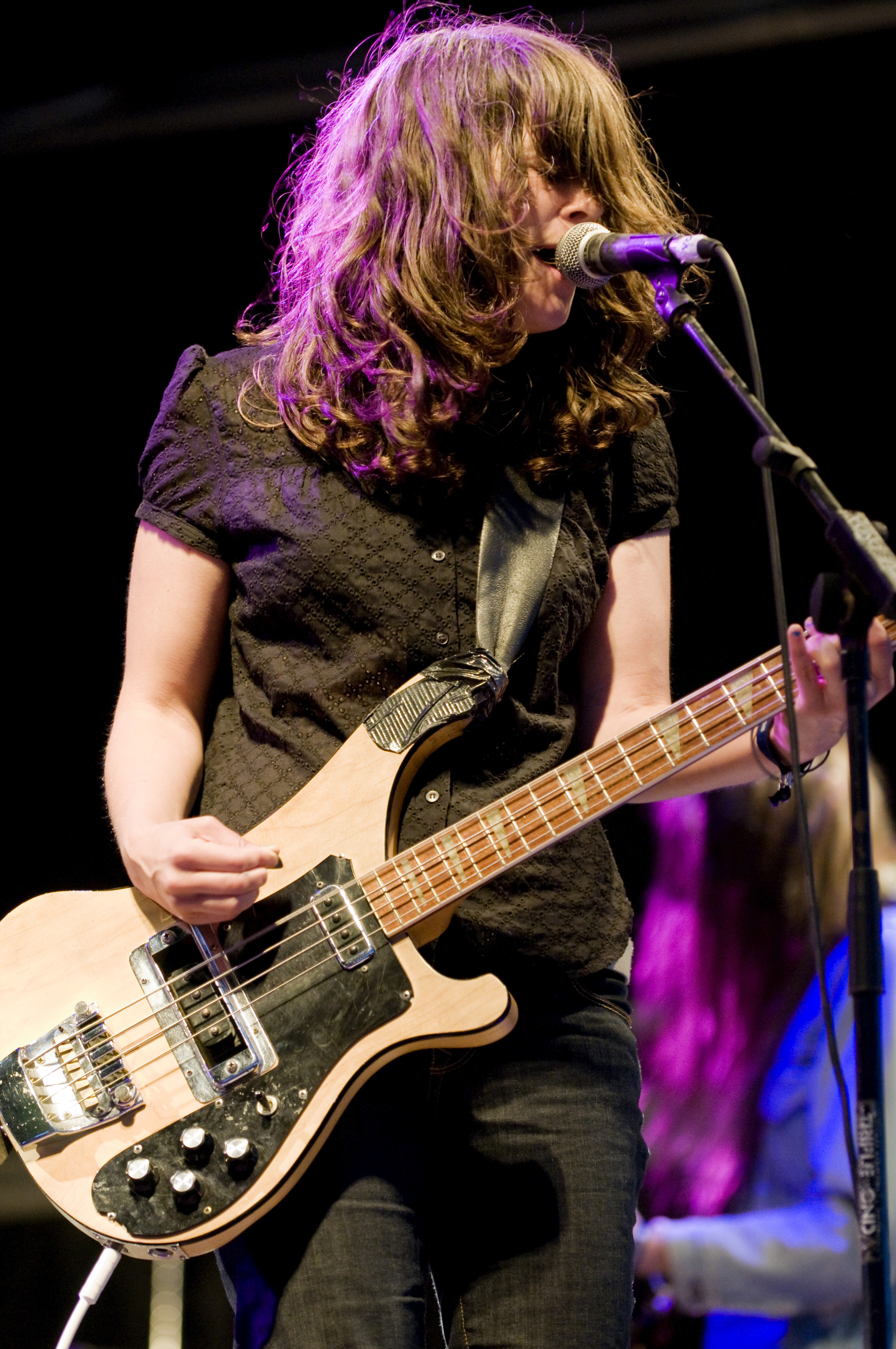
Julie Doiron

- E. G. Daily
- Rita Dakota (Monroe)
- Lisa Dalbello
- Brody Dalle (The Distillers, Spinnerette)
- Betty Davis
- Danielle Dax
- Taylor Dayne
- Kim Deal (Pixies, The Breeders)
- Joanna Dean
- Lezlie Deane
- Carol Decker (T'Pau)
- Maria Del Mar (National Velvet)
- Lana Del Rey
- Suze DeMarchi (Baby Animals)
- Tatiana DeMaria (TAT)
- Marina Diamandis (Marina and the Diamonds)
- Dido
- Ani DiFranco
- Dilana
- Beth Ditto (The Gossip)
- Melanie Doane
- Lou Doillon
- Julie Doiron
- Corinne Drewery (Swing Out Sister)
- Julie Driscoll
- Annette Ducharme
- Heather Duby
- Sherri DuPree (Eisley)

== E ==
- Bobbie Eakes (Big Trouble)
- Tammy Ealom (Dressy Bessy, The Minders)
- Sheena Easton
- Andrea Echeverri (Aterciopelados)
- Aimee Echo (TheStart, Human Waste Project)
- Danielle Egnew
- Ella
- Mama Cass Elliot (The Mamas & the Papas)
- Sophie Ellis-Bextor (Theaudience)
- Elizabeth Elmore (The Reputation, Sarge)
- Liz Enthusiasm (Freezepop)
- Melissa Etheridge

== F ==
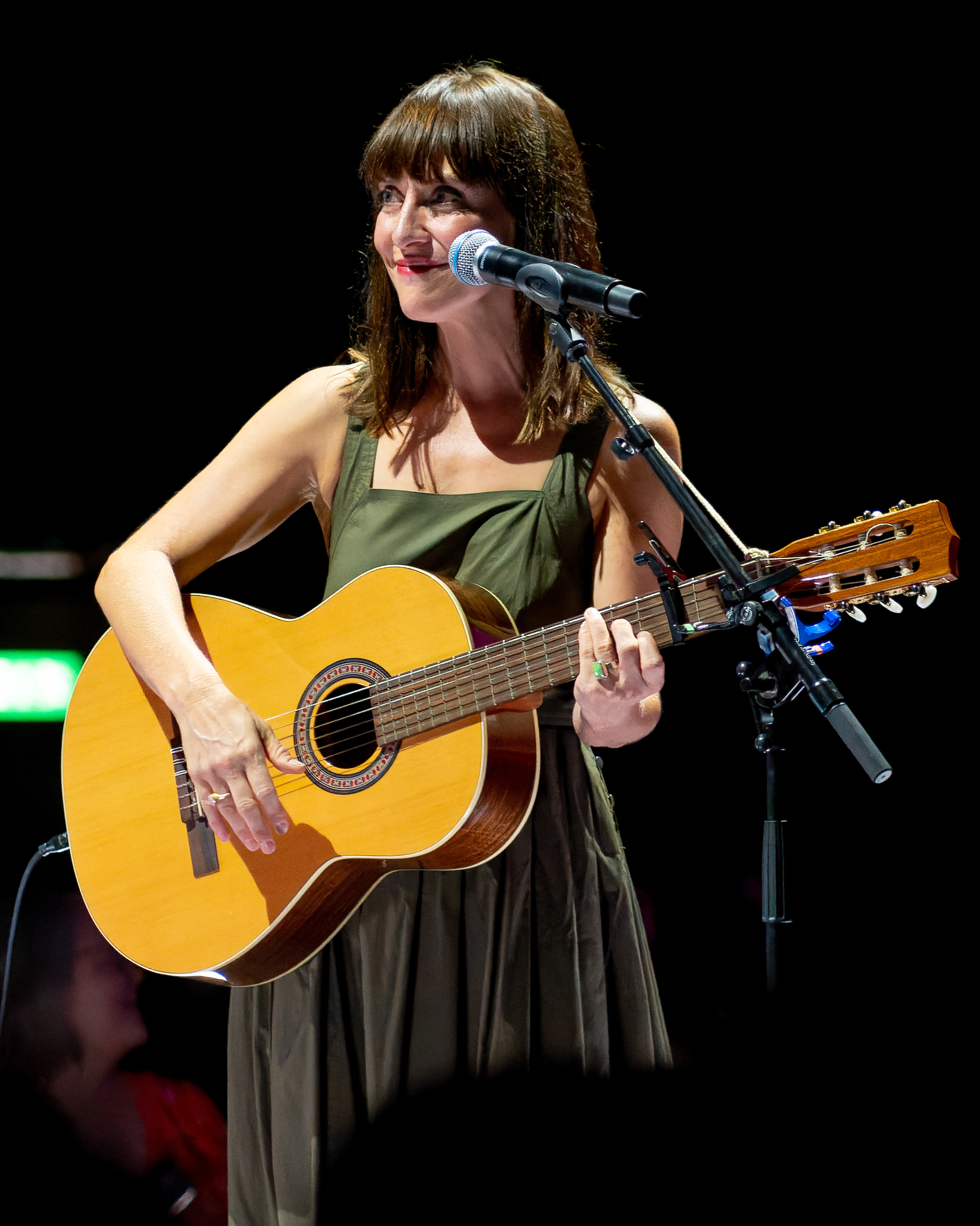
Feist

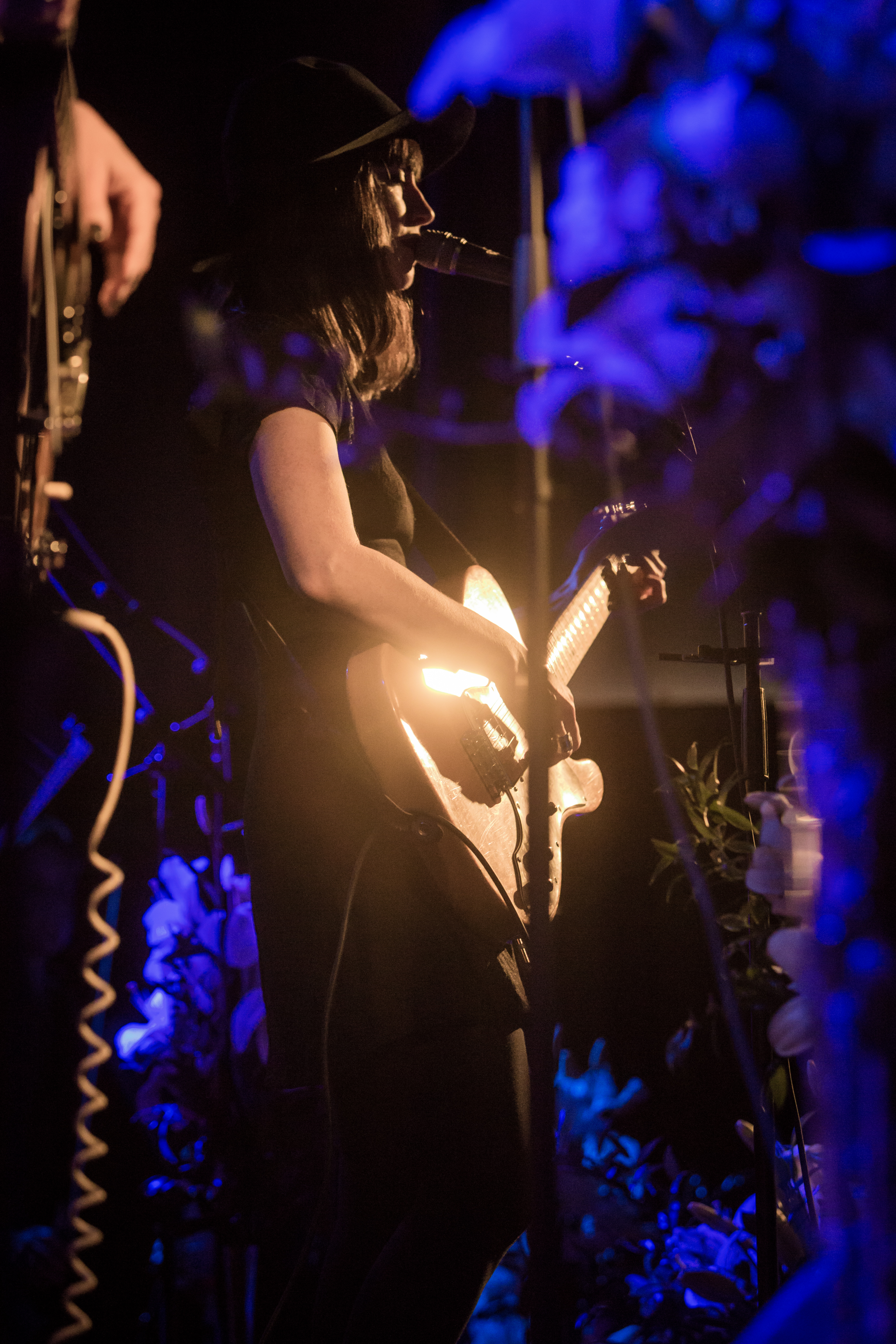
Orenda Fink

- Siobhan Fahey (Bananarama, Shakespears Sister)
- Marianne Faithfull
- Etty Lau Farrell (Satellite Party)
- Leslie Feist (Broken Social Scene)
- Şebnem Ferah
- Sky Ferreira
- Melissa Ferrick
- Jennifer Finch (The Pandoras, L7, The Shocker)
- Orenda Fink (Azure Ray, Now It's Overhead, Art in Manila)
- Samantha Fish
- Colleen Fitzpatrick (Eve's Plum)
- Fiona Flanagan
- Flor
- Ellen Foley
- Cassandra Ford (The Vincent Black Shadow)
- Frazey Ford
- Lita Ford (The Runaways)
- Dia Frampton (Meg & Dia)
- Meg Frampton (Meg & Dia)
- Elizabeth Fraser (Cocteau Twins)
- Marie Fredriksson (Roxette)
- Eleanor Friedberger (The Fiery Furnaces)
- Justine Frischmann (Elastica)
- Dana Fuchs
- Miki Furukawa

== G ==
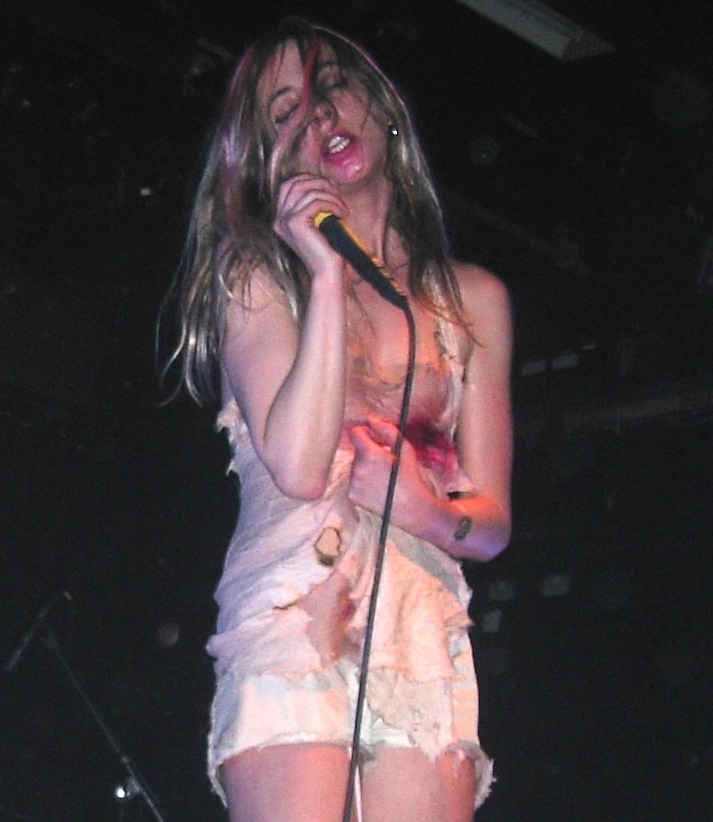
KatieJane Garside

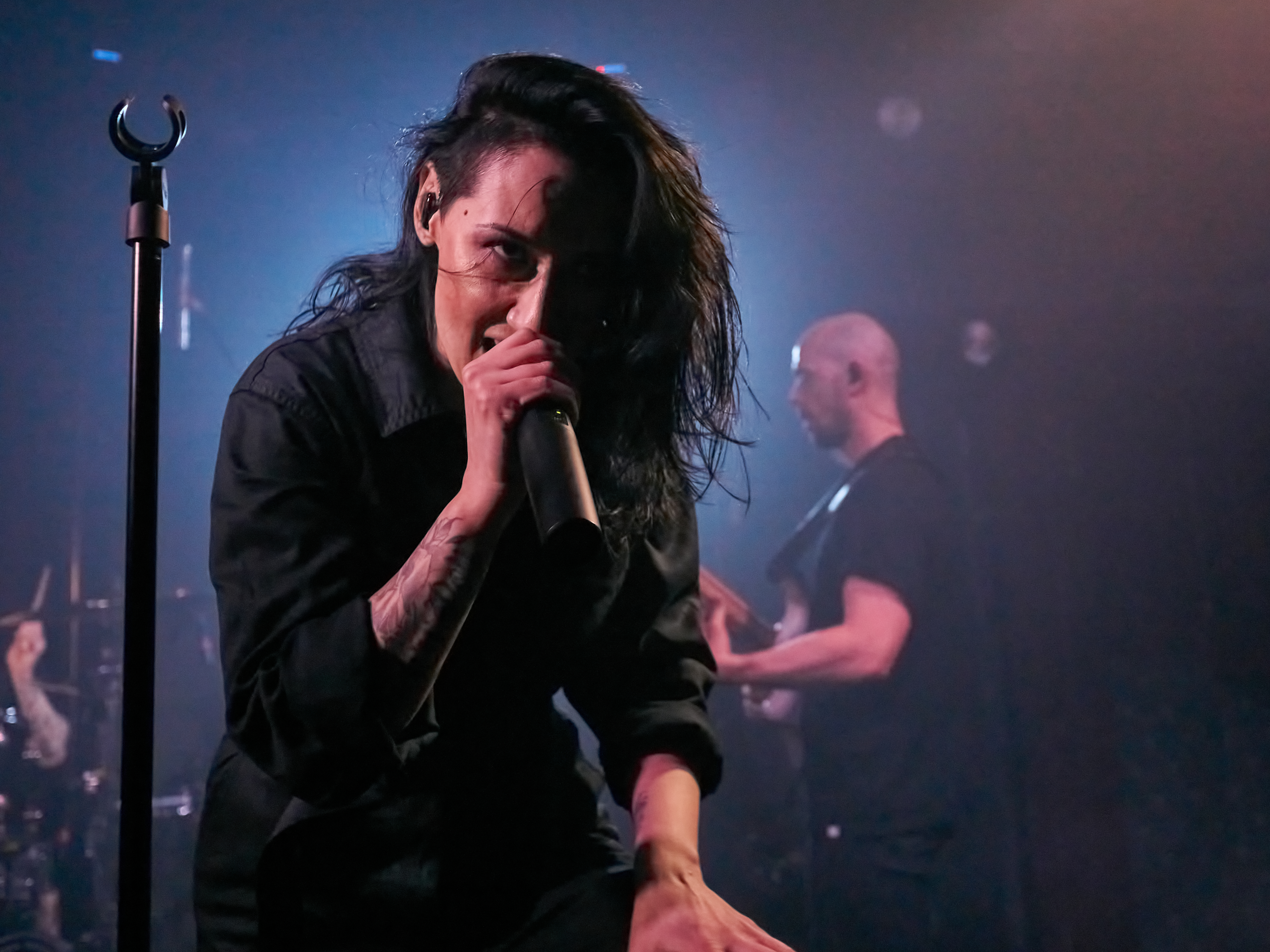
Lusine Gevorkyan

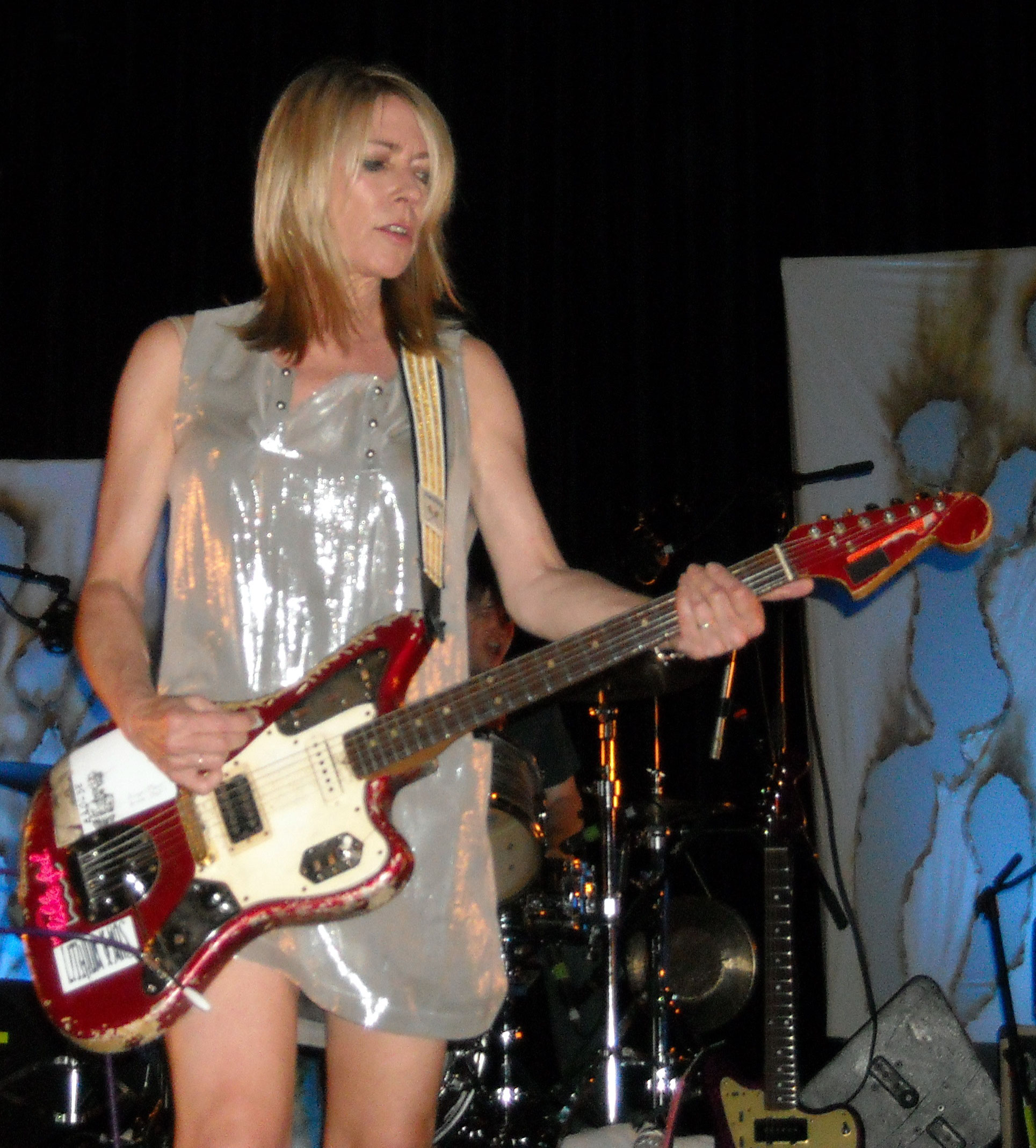
Kim Gordon

- Diamanda Galas
- Erica Garcia
- Janet Gardner (Vixen; mid-1980s)
- Suzi Gardner (L7)
- KatieJane Garside (Daisy Chainsaw, Queenadreena)
- Teri Gender Bender (Le Butcherettes)
- Anna Gerasimova
- Lisa Germano (Eels)
- Lusine Gevorkyan (Sphere of Influence, Tracktor Bowling, Louna)
- Beth Gibbons (Portishead)
- Donna Godchaux
- Goldy Locks
- Holly Golightly (Thee Headcoatees)
- Kim Gordon (Sonic Youth, Free Kitten, Harry Crews)
- Nina Gordon (Veruca Salt)
- Lesley Gore
- Rachel Goswell (Slowdive, Mojave 3)
- Anya Green (LaScala)
- Wynne Greenwood (Tracy + the Plastics)
- Jemma Griffiths (Jem)
- Clare Grogan (Altered Images)
- Ely Guerra
- Lyndsey Gunnulfsen (PVRIS)
- Alejandra Guzmán

== H ==
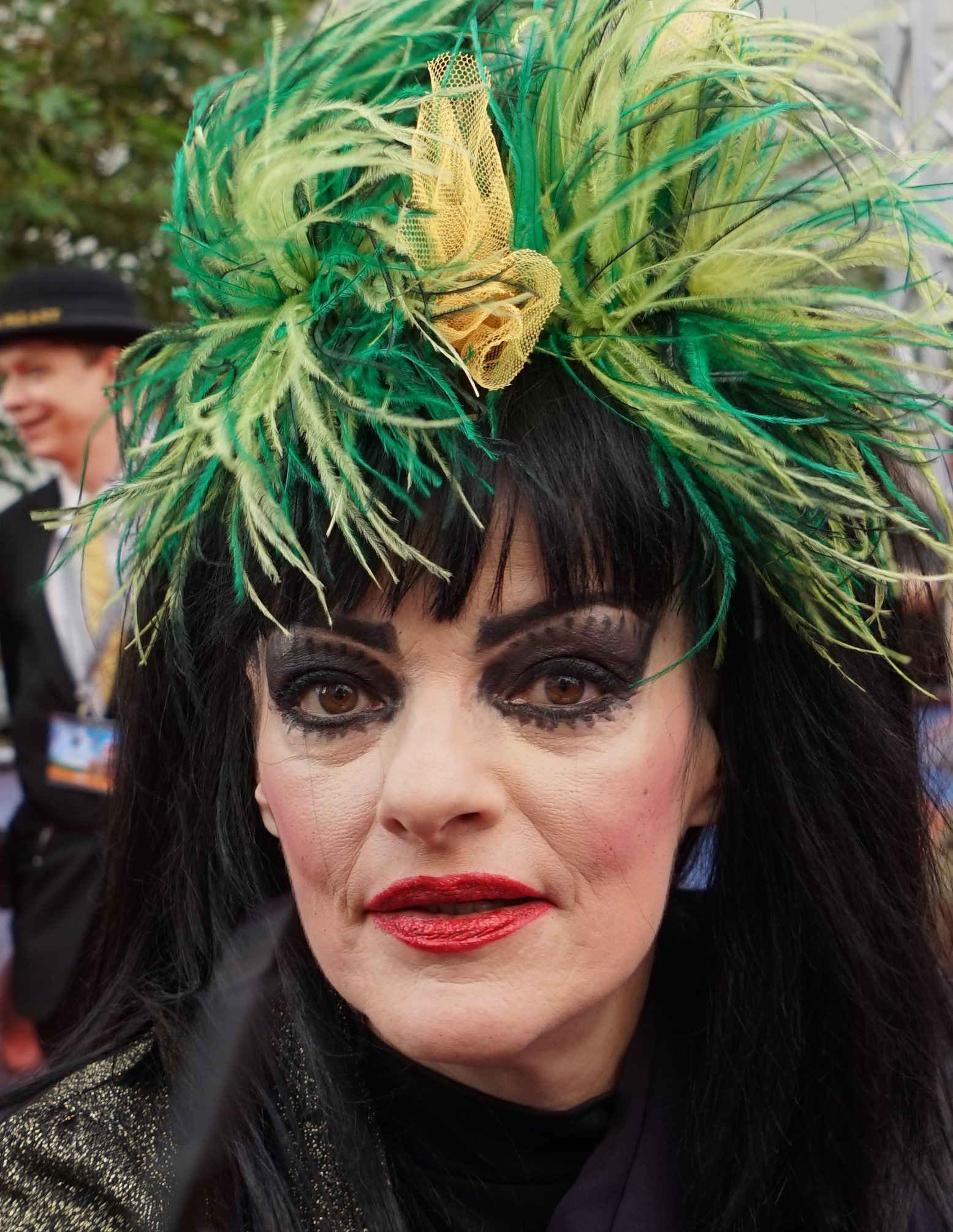
Nina Hagen

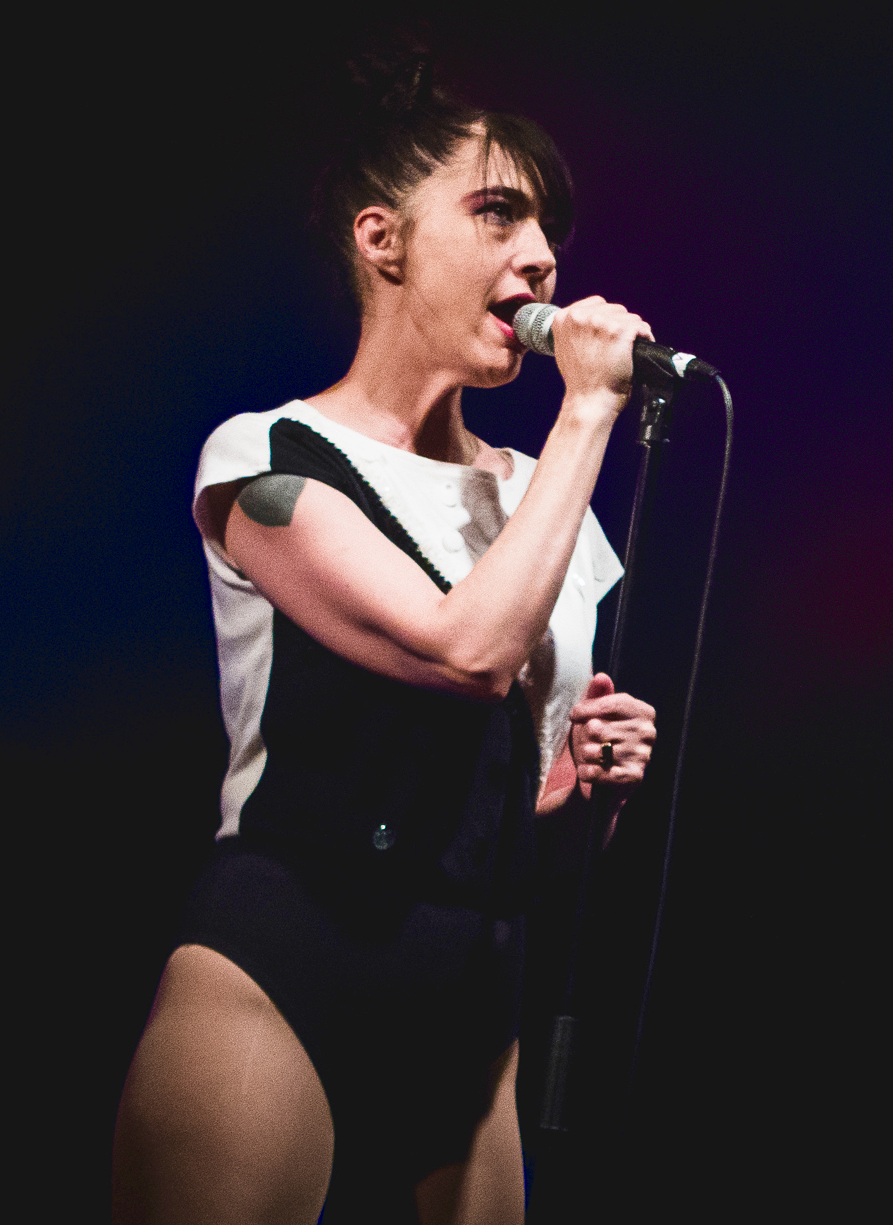
Kathleen Hanna

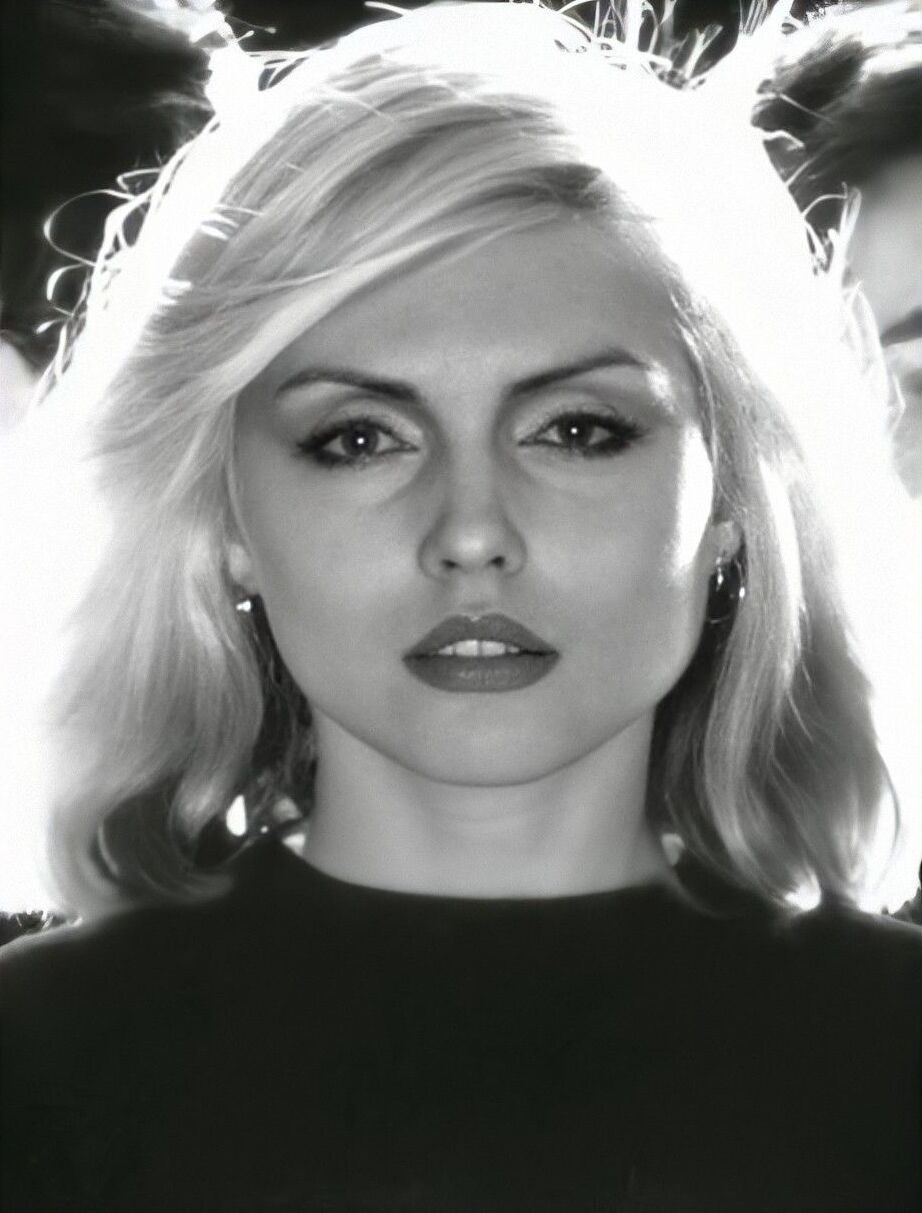
Debbie Harry

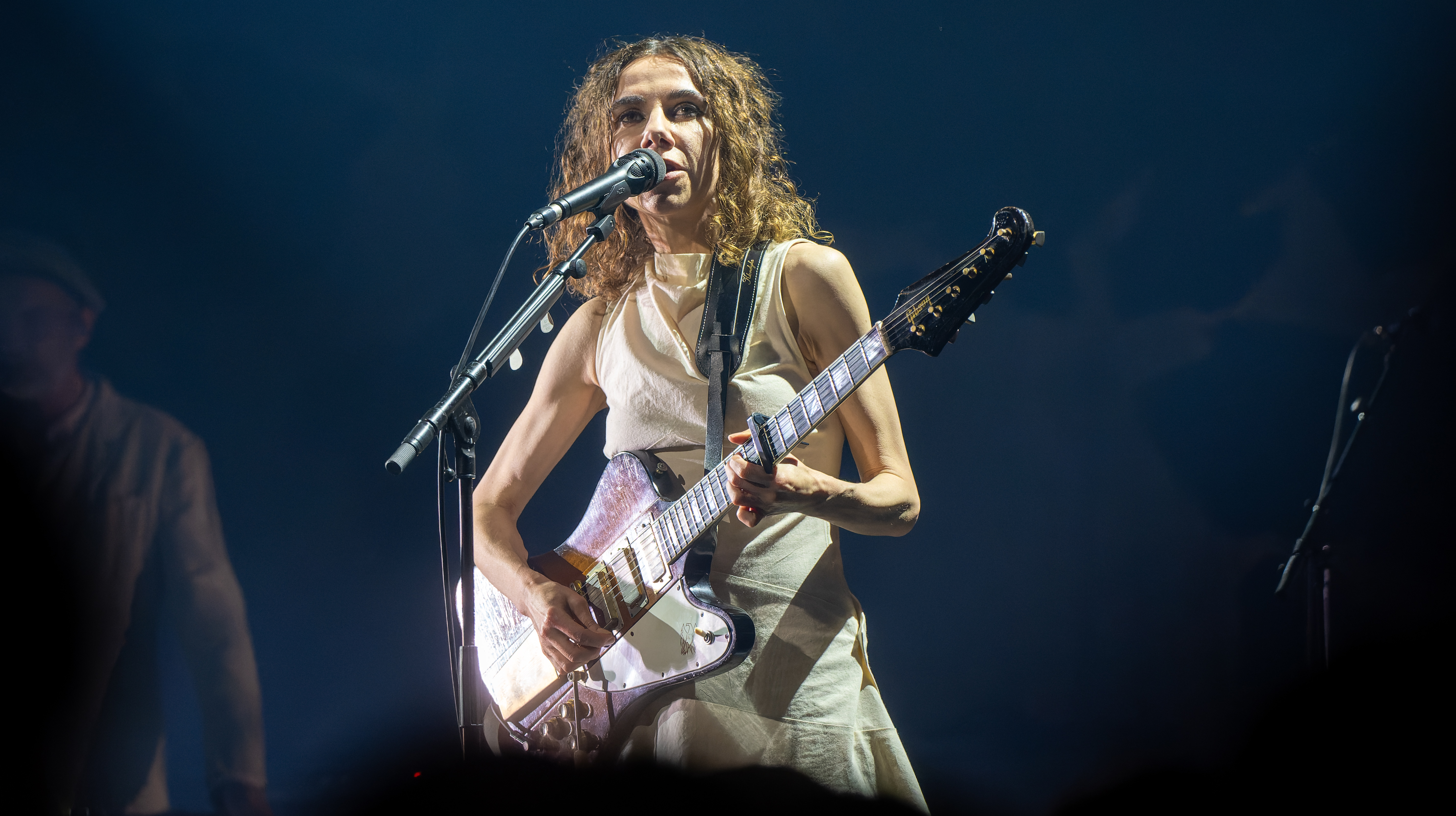
PJ Harvey

- Nina Hagen (The Nina Hagen Band)
- Danielle Haim (Haim)
- Emily Haines (Broken Social Scene, Emily Haines and the Soft Skeleton and Metric)
- Lzzy Hale (Halestorm)
- Toni Halliday (Curve)
- Halsey
- Bianca Halstead (Betty Blowtorch, Butt Trumpet)
- Ayumi Hamasaki
- Kay Hanley (Letters to Cleo)
- Kathleen Hanna (Bikini Kill, Le Tigre, The Julie Ruin)
- Lisa Hannigan
- Annie Hardy (Giant Drag)
- Sarah Harmer (The Saddletramps, Weeping Tile)
- Emmylou Harris
- Debbie Harry (Blondie)
- Beth Hart
- PJ Harvey
- Annie Haslam (Renaissance)
- Juliana Hatfield (Blake Babies, The Lemonheads)
- Charlotte Hatherley (Ash)
- Miho Hatori (Cibo Matto)
- Imogen Heap (Frou Frou)
- Christy Hemme
- Nona Hendryx
- Jennifer Herrema (Royal Trux)
- Kristin Hersh (Throwing Muses, 50 Foot Wave)
- Susanna Hoffs (The Bangles)
- Ella Hooper (Killing Heidi)
- Horse
- Penelope Houston (The Avengers)
- Jenny Hoyston (Erase Errata)
- Laura Hubert (Leslie Spit Treeo)
- Anne-Marie Hurst (Skeletal Family, Ghost Dance)
- Chrissie Hynde (The Pretenders)

== I ==
- Laura Imbruglia
- Natalie Imbruglia
- Maja Ivarsson (The Sounds)
- Debora Iyall (Romeo Void)
- Izïa

== J ==
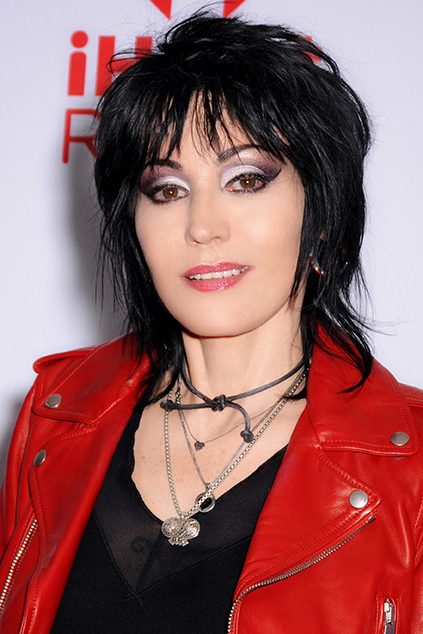
Joan Jett

- Cindy Jackson (The Dollz)
- Kate Jackson (The Long Blondes)
- Wanda Jackson
- Etta James
- Wendy James (Transvision Vamp)
- Floor Jansen (Nightwish, Northward, After Forever)
- Taylor Jardine (We Are The In Crowd)
- Jane Jensen
- Jessicka (Jack Off Jill, Scarling.)
- Joan Jett (The Runaways, The Blackhearts, Evil Stig)
- Kelly Johnson (Girlschool)
- Martha Johnson (Martha and the Muffins)
- Marta Jandova (Die Happy)
- Molly Johnson (Alta Moda, Infidels)
- Taborah Johnson
- Gloria Jones
- Grace Jones
- Rickie Lee Jones
- Janis Joplin (Big Brother and the Holding Company, Kozmic Blues Band)
- Sass Jordan
- Milla Jovovich
- K. Juno

== K ==
- Kaliopi
- Lena Katina
- Tomoko Kawase (Tommy Heavenly6)
- Lisa Kekaula (The Bellrays)
- Rose Kemp
- Joyce Kennedy (singer) (Mother's Finest)
- Kerri Kenney-Silver (Cake Like)
- Chaka Khan
- Natasha Khan (Bat for Lashes)
- Carole King
- Elle King
- Kaori Kishitani (Princess Princess)
- Stefanie Kloß (Silbermond)
- Chrissi Klug (Luttenberger*Klug)
- Jennifer Knapp
- Gladys Knight
- Theo Kogan (Theo & the Skyscrapers, Lunachicks)
- Ash Koley
- Olga Kormukhina
- Alexis Krauss (Sleigh Bells)
- Chantal Kreviazuk
- Sonja Kristina (Curved Air)
- Mira Kubasińska (Blackout, Breakout, and After Blues)
- Jan Kuehnemund (Vixen; early 1970s)
- Sierra Kusterbeck (VersaEmerge)

== L ==
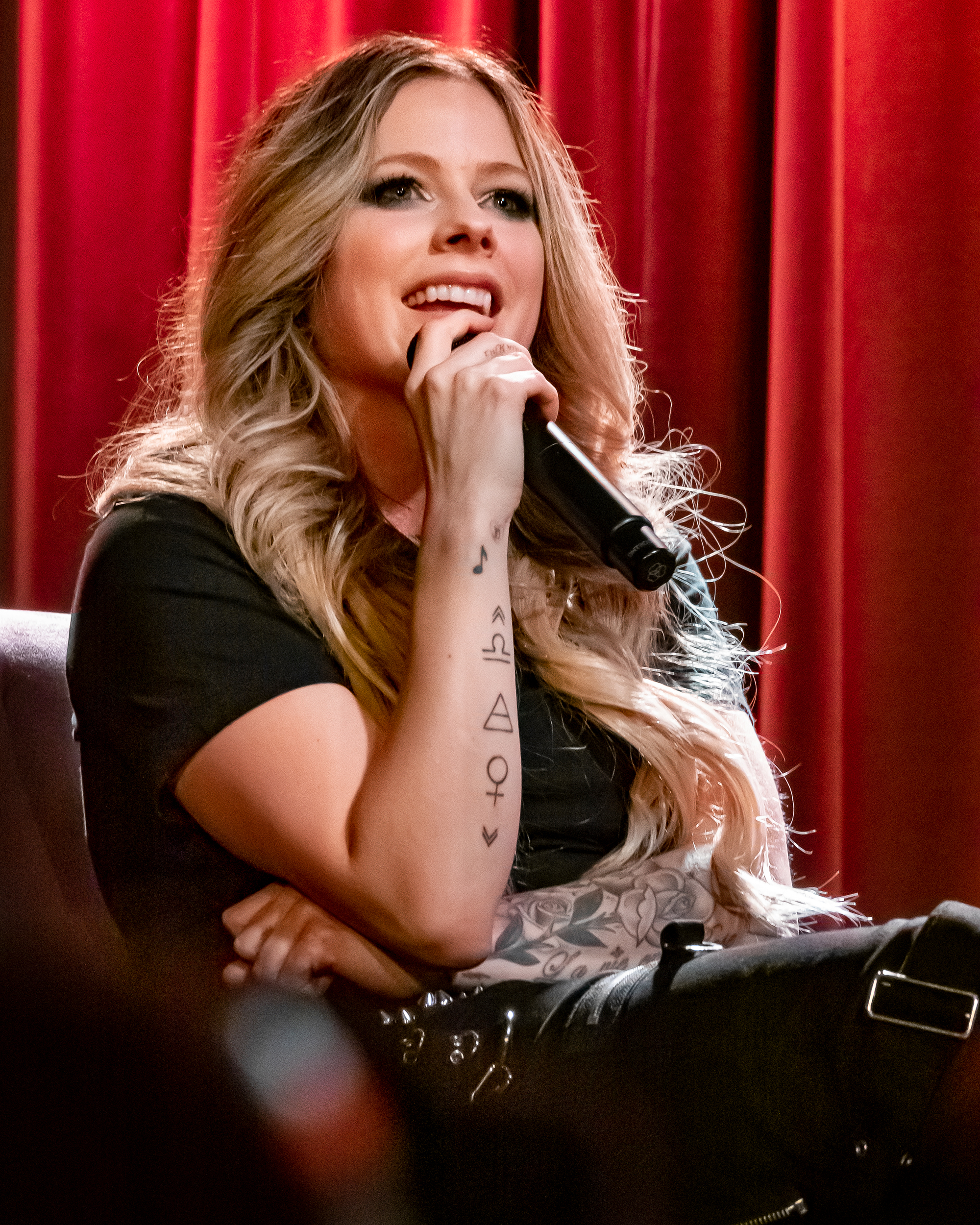
Avril Lavigne

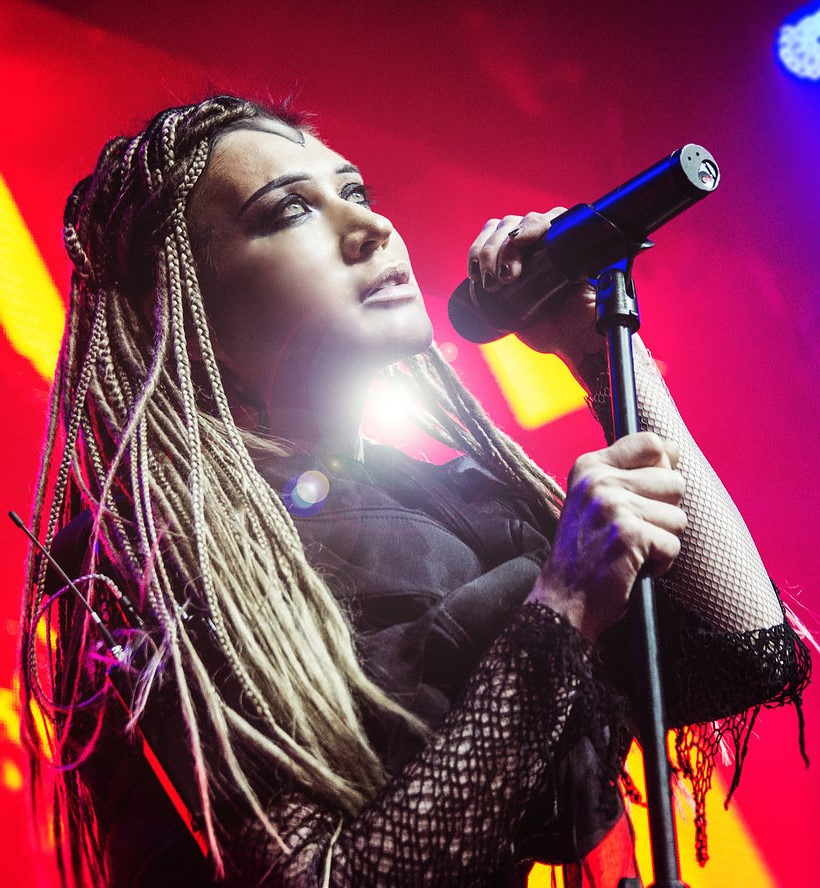
Linda

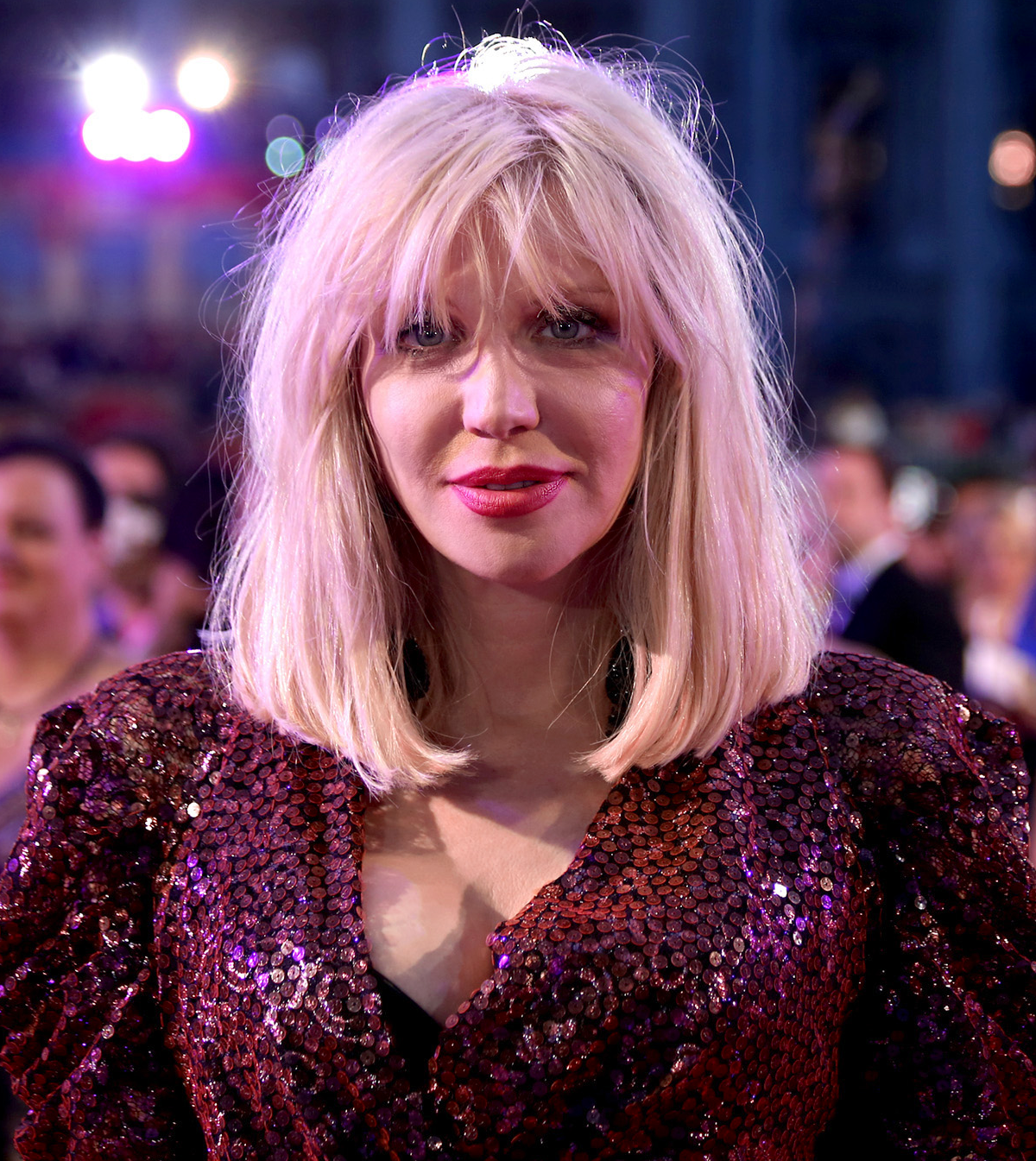
Courtney Love

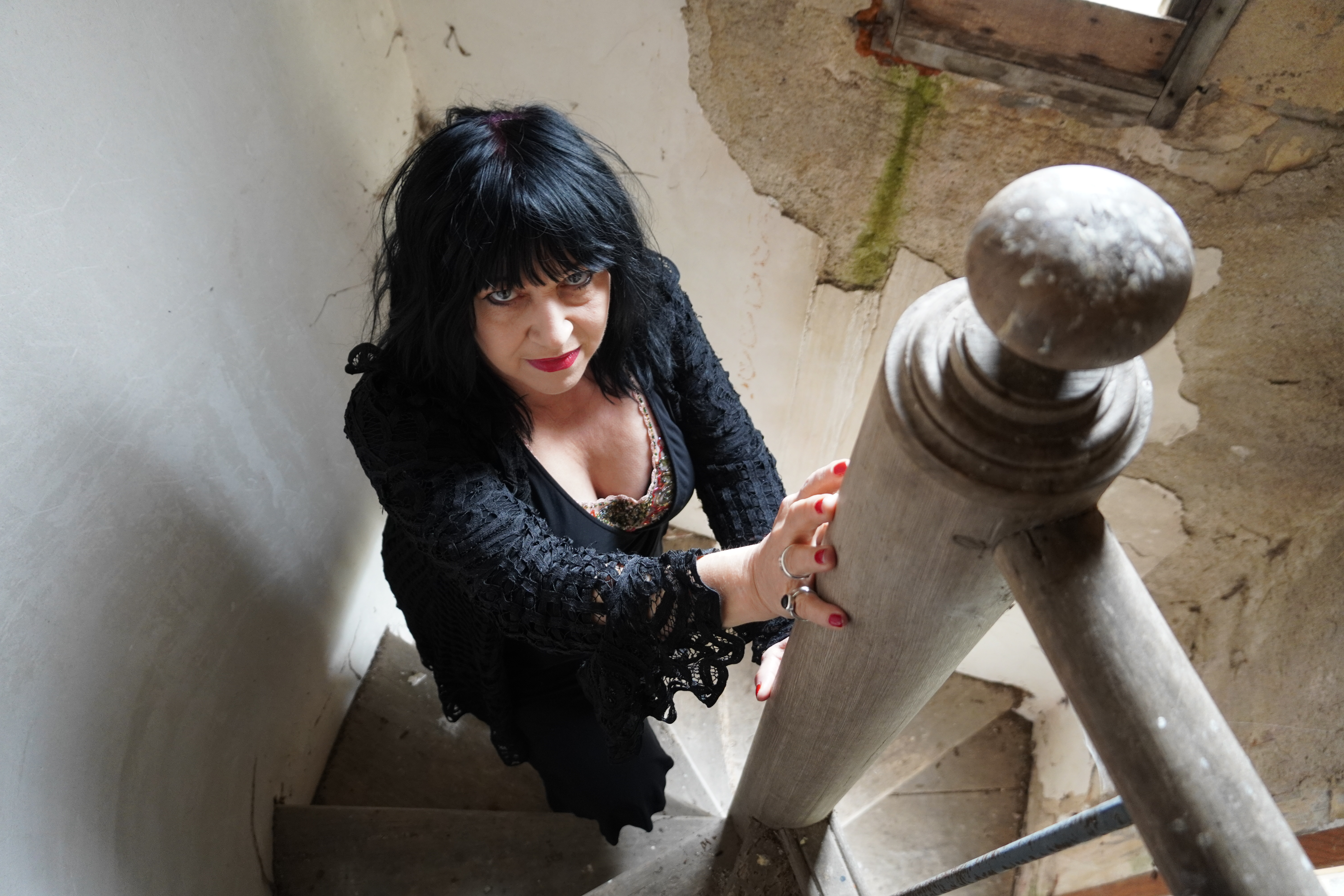
Lydia Lunch

- Patti LaBelle
- Lachi
- Martha Ladly (Martha and the Muffins, The Associates)
- LaFee
- Mon Laferte
- Natalia Lafourcade
- Shona Laing
- Nomy Lamm
- Anita Lane
- Lana Lane
- Robin Lane
- Storm Large
- Liz Larin
- Cyndi Lauper
- Dyanna Lauren (Thousand Year Itch)
- Lauren Laverne (Kenickie)
- Avril Lavigne
- Noelle LeBlanc (Damone)
- Jen Ledger (Skillet (band))
- Brenda Lee
- Rita Lee (Os Mutantes)
- Sook-Yin Lee (Bob's Your Uncle)
- Annie Lennox (Eurythmics)
- Adrianne Leon
- Katrina Leskanich (Katrina and the Waves)
- Jenny Lewis (Rilo Kiley, Jenny Lewis and The Watson Twins)
- Juliette Lewis (Juliette and the Licks)
- Susanne Lewis (Hail, Thinking Plague)
- Linda (Linda, Convoy, Bloody Faeries)
- Little Annie
- Little Eva
- Cristina Llanos (Dover)
- Lisa Lobsinger (Broken Social Scene, Reverie Sound Revue)
- Lisa Loeb
- Lora Logic (X-Ray Spex, Essential Logic, Red Krayola)
- Lindsay Lohan
- Mary Lou Lord
- Ruth Lorenzo
- Inger Lorre (The Nymphs)
- Bonnie Lou
- Sara Lov (Devics)
- Courtney Love (Hole)
- Darlene Love
- Lovefoxxx (CSS)
- Lene Lovich
- Pearl Lowe (Powder)
- Lulu
- Lydia Lunch (Teenage Jesus and the Jerks, Beirut Slump, 8-Eyed Spy, Harry Crews)
- Michelle Luttenberger (Luttenberger*Klug)
- Annabella Lwin (Bow Wow Wow)

== M ==
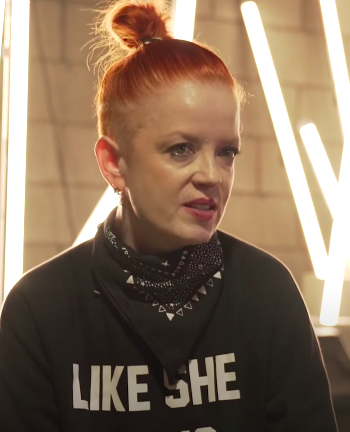
Shirley Manson

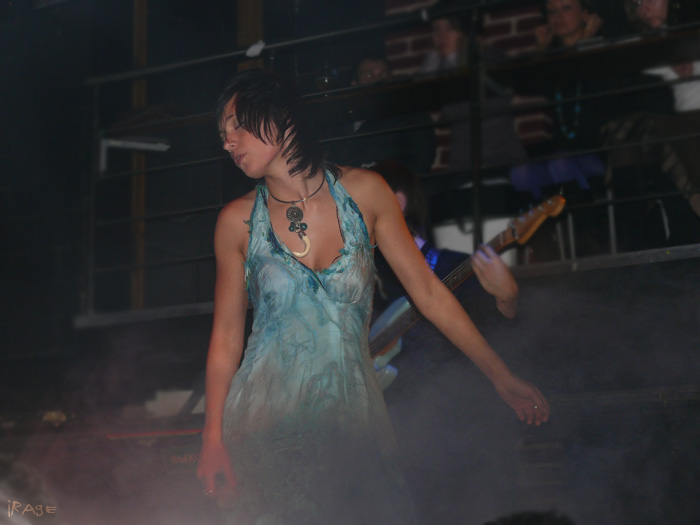
Mara

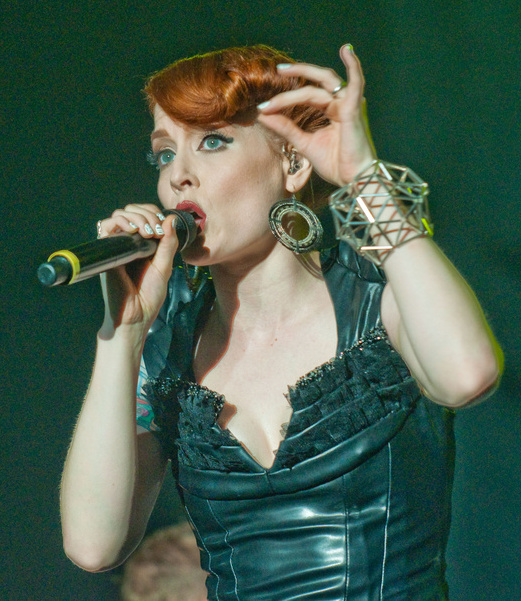
Ana Matronic

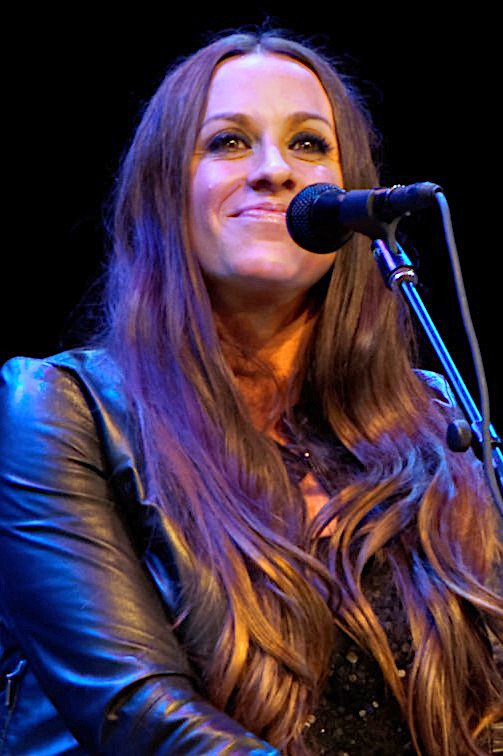
Alanis Morissette

- Mariqueen Maandig (How To Destroy Angels)
- Kirsty MacColl
- Amy Macdonald
- Maggie MacDonald (Republic of Safety, Kids on TV, Barcelona Pavilion)
- Lois Maffeo
- Leslie Mah (Anti-Scrunti Faction)
- Carmen Maki
- Michelle Malone
- Aimee Mann ('Til Tuesday)
- Barbara Manning
- Shirley Manson (Garbage, Goodbye Mr Mackenzie, Angelfish)
- Mara
- April March
- Ida Maria
- Marjo
- Chan Marshall (Cat Power)
- Dorothy Martin (Dorothy)
- Janis Martin
- Hayley Mary (The Jezabels)
- Carolyne Mas
- Ana Matronic (Scissor Sisters)
- Remi Matsuo (Glim Spanky)
- Cerys Matthews (Catatonia)
- Imelda May
- Kim McAuliffe (Girlschool)
- Denise McCann (Headpins)
- Elizabeth McGrath (Miss Derringer)
- Frances McKee
- Maria McKee
- Sarah McLeod (The Superjesus)
- Sarah McLachlan
- Holly McNarland
- Sylvia McNeill
- Christine McVie (Fleetwood Mac)
- Fleming McWilliams (Fleming and John)
- Wendy Melvoin (Wendy & Lisa)
- Natalie Merchant (10,000 Maniacs)
- Olivia Merilahti (The Dø)
- Tift Merritt
- Krystal Meyers
- Riki Michele
- Bette Midler
- Amy Millan (Stars, Broken Social Scene)
- June Millington (Fanny)
- Darby Mills (Headpins)
- Kylie Minogue
- Rachel Minton (Zolof the Rock & Roll Destroyer)
- Holly Miranda (The Jealous Girlfriends)
- Joni Mitchell
- Taylor Momsen (The Pretty Reckless)
- Betty Moon
- Alecia Beth Moore (P!nk)
- Rebecca Moore
- Lisa Moorish
- Camila Moreno
- Alanis Morissette
- Patricia Morrison (Bags, Legal Weapon, The Gun Club, The Sisterhood, The Damned)
- Lisa Moorish
- Dorothy Moskowitz (The United States of America)
- Alison Mosshart (Discount, The Kills, The Dead Weather)
- Alison Moyet (Yazoo)
- Lennon Murphy
- Pauline Murray (Penetration)
- Billie Myers
- Alannah Myles

== N ==
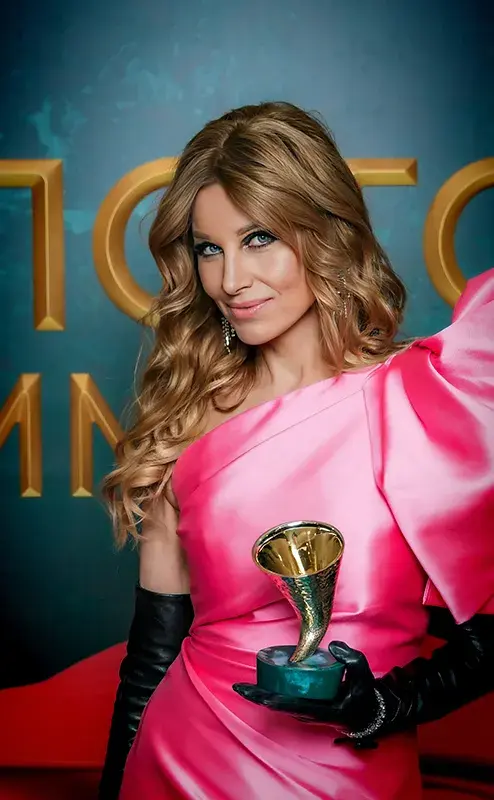
Irina Nelson

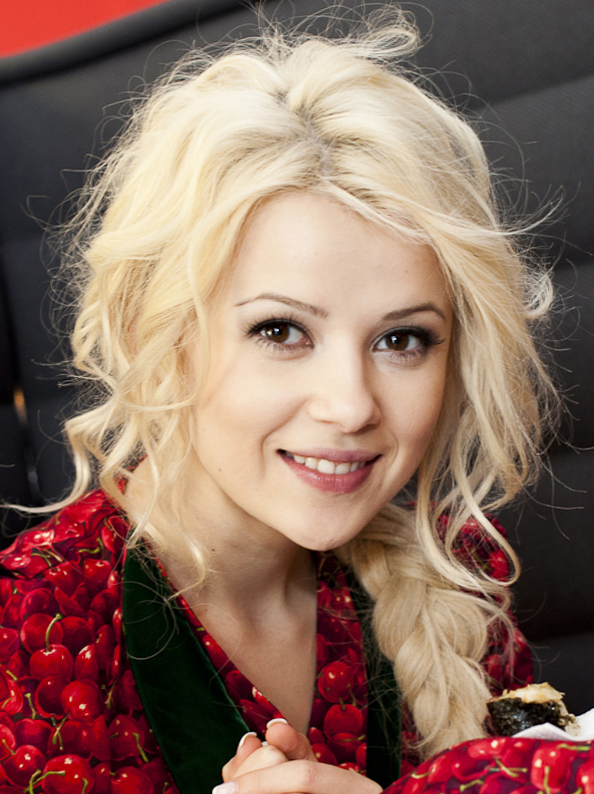
Mika Newton

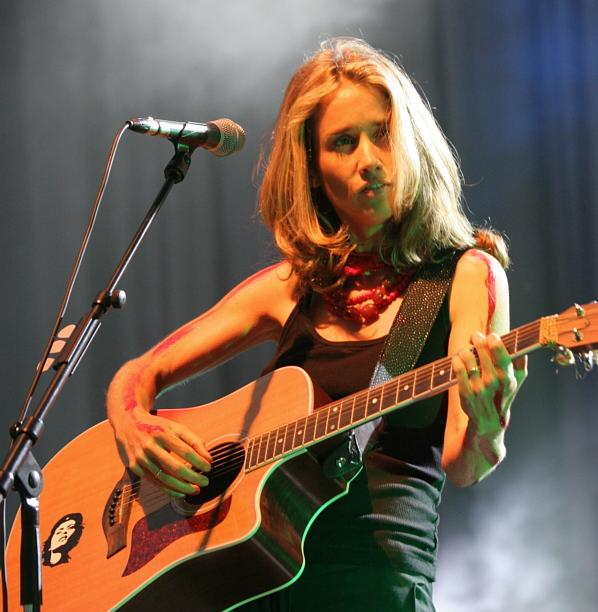
Heather Nova

- Mika Nakashima
- Michie Nakatani (Shonen Knife)
- Terra Naomi
- Johnette Napolitano (Concrete Blonde)
- Leigh Bingham Nash (Sixpence None the Richer)
- Sandra Nasic (Guano Apes)
- JD Natasha (Condors and Chaos)
- Ednita Nazario
- Irina Nelson (Reflex)
- Nena
- Anastacia Newkirk (Anastacia)
- Juice Newton
- Mika Newton
- Olivia Newton-John
- Stevie Nicks (Fleetwood Mac)
- Nico
- Ninja (The Go! Team)
- Sarah Nixey (Black Box Recorder)
- Stina Nordenstam
- Tone Norum
- Kasia Nosowska (Hey)
- Heather Nova
- Terri Nunn (Berlin)
- Laura Nyro

== O ==
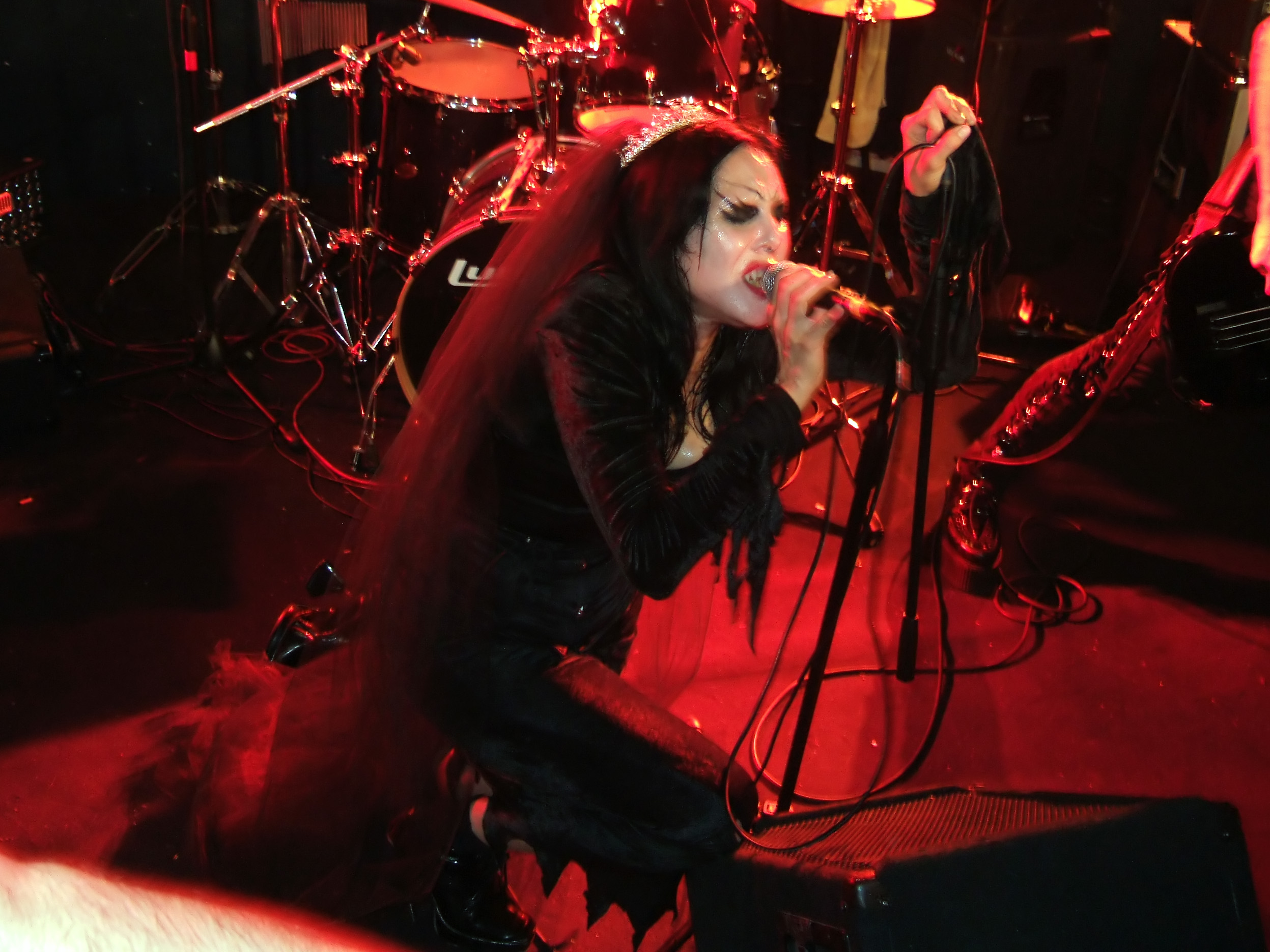
Eva O

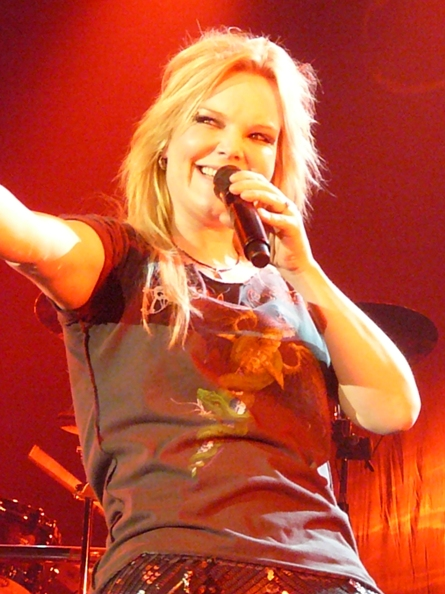
Anette Olzon

- Orianthi
- Eva O (Christian Death)
- Karen Orzolek (Yeah Yeah Yeahs)
- Hazel O'Connor
- Sinéad O'Connor
- Olivia
- Anette Olzon (Nightwish, Alyson Avenue, The Dark Element)
- Yoko Ono (The Plastic Ono Band)
- Dolores O'Riordan (The Cranberries)
- Beth Orton
- Joan Osborne

== P ==
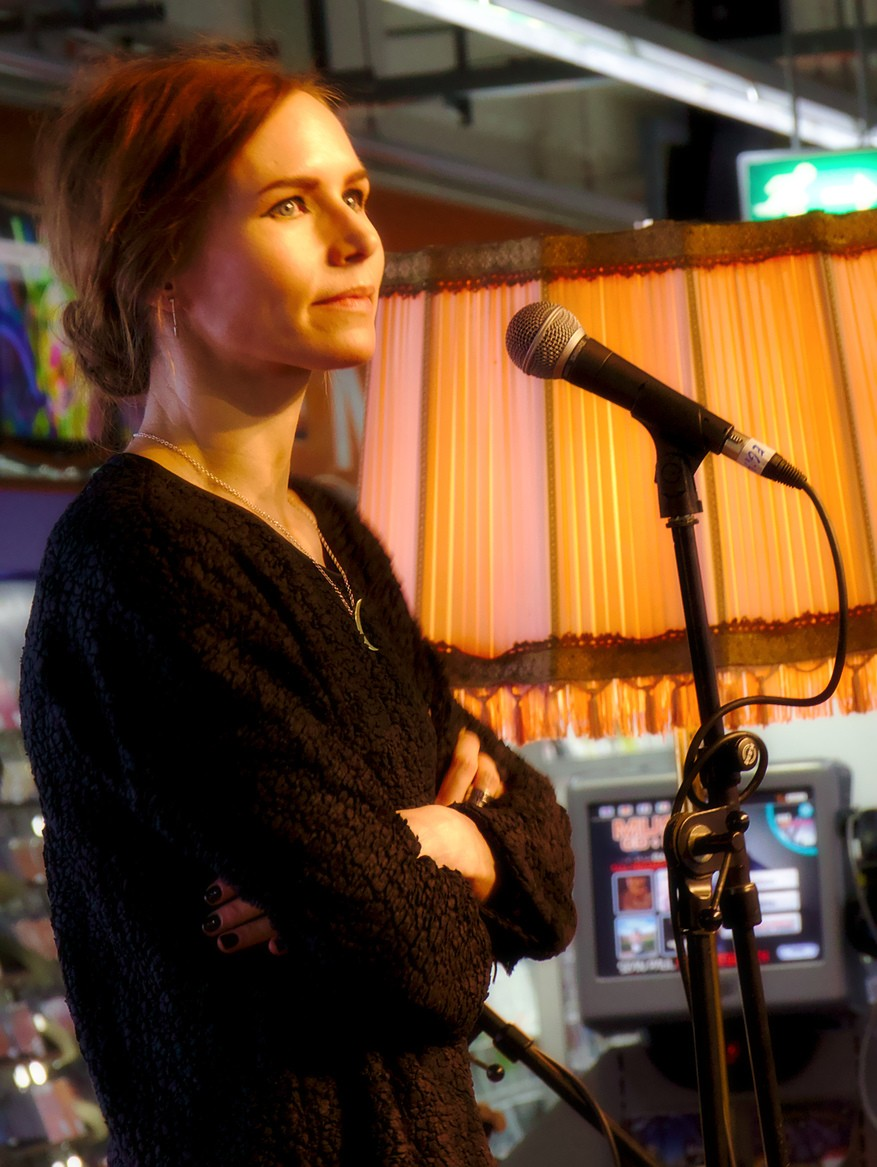
Nina Persson

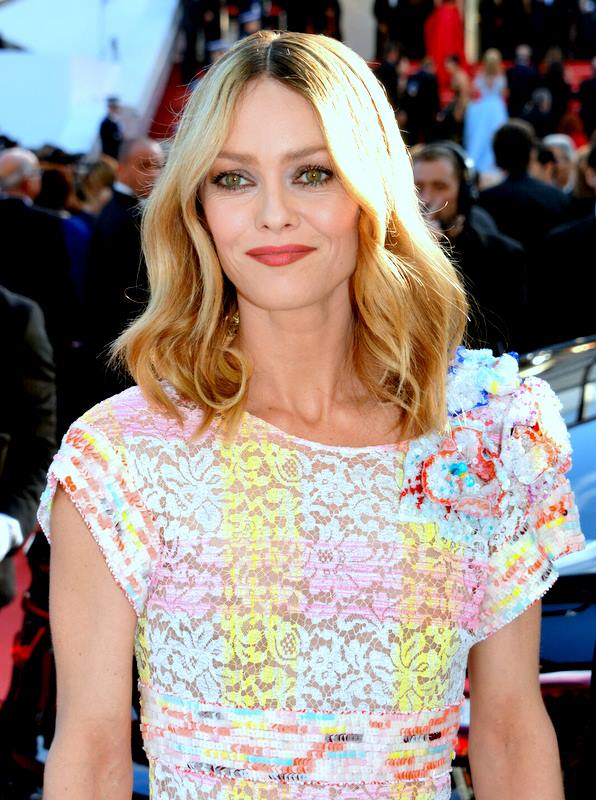
Vanessa Paradis

- Amanda Palmer (The Dresden Dolls)
- Vanessa Paradis
- Dolly Parton
- Annette Peacock
- Jemina Pearl (Be Your Own Pet)
- Laura Pergolizzi (LP)
- Katy Perry
- Linda Perry (4 Non Blondes)
- Nina Persson (The Cardigans, Sparklehorse, A Camp)
- Vicki Peterson (The Bangles)
- Vanessa Petruo
- Kembra Pfahler (The Voluptuous Horror of Karen Black)
- Liz Phair
- Britta Phillips (Luna)
- Michelle Phillips (The Mamas & the Papas)
- Phranc (Nervous Gender, Catholic Discipline)
- Kate Pierson (The B-52's)
- Pink
- Pitty
- Poe
- Tamala Poljak (Longstocking)
- Carole Pope (Rough Trade)
- Cassadee Pope (Hey Monday)
- Louise Post (Veruca Salt)
- Grace Potter (Grace Potter and the Nocturnals)
- Cat Power
- Preslava
- Lisa Marie Presley
- Anne Preven
- Lindsay Price

== Q ==
- Suzi Quatro
- Sara Quin (Tegan and Sara)
- Tegan Quin (Tegan and Sara)
- Diana Quinn (Tru Fax and the Insaniacs, Honky Tonk Confidential, The Fabulettes)
- Stacey Q

== R ==
- Stefy Rae (Stefy)
- Ma Rainey
- Bonnie Raitt
- Mary Ramsey (10,000 Maniacs, John & Mary)
- Genya Ravan (The Escorts, Goldie & the Gingerbreads, Ten Wheel Drive)
- Marion Raven
- Amy Ray (Indigo Girls)
- Julianne Regan (All About Eve)
- Jane Relf (Renaissance)
- Manda Rin (Bis)
- Catherine Ringer (Les Rita Mitsouko)
- Janet Robin
- The Roches
- Olivia Rodrigo
- Katy Rose
- Christina Rosenvinge
- Patti Rothberg
- Linda Ronstadt
- Tina Root (Switchblade Symphony, Tre Lux)
- Amanda Rootes (Fluffy)
- Holly Ross (Angelica)
- Ellie Rowsell (Wolf Alice)
- Nene Royal
- Emma Ruth Rundle (Marriages and Red Sparowes)
- Serena Ryder

== S ==
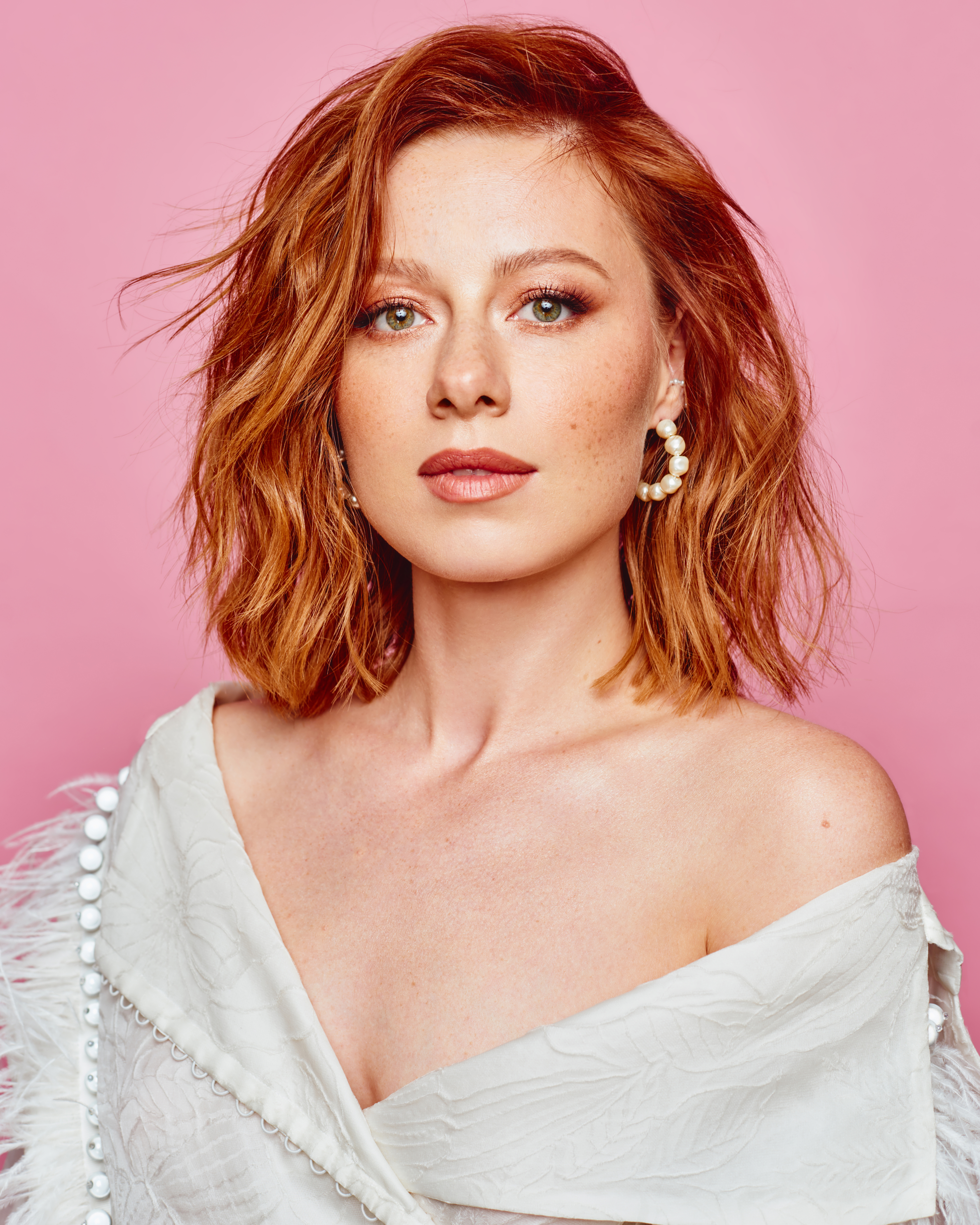
Yulia Savicheva

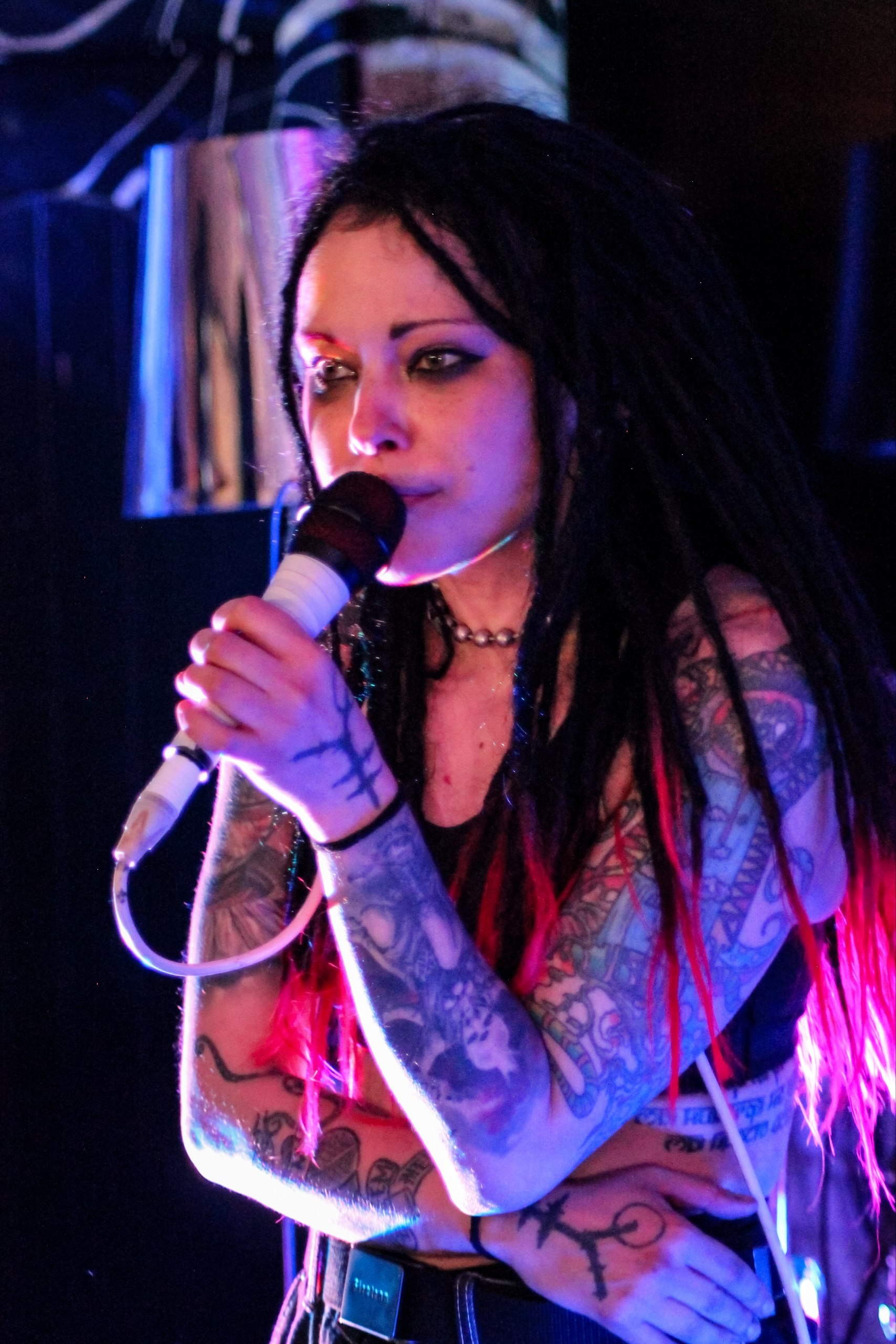
Daria Stavrovich

- Yulia Savicheva
- Kim Shattuck (The Muffs, The Pandoras)
- Ringo Sheena (Tokyo Jihen)
- Davetta Sherwood
- Shery
- Madigan Shive (Tattle Tale, Bonfire Madigan)
- Ana da Silva (The Raincoats)
- Jane Siberry (AKA Issa)
- Juliet Simms (Automatic Loveletter)
- Jenny Simmons (Addison Road)
- Simone Simons
- Carly Simon
- Ashlee Simpson
- Nancy Sinatra
- Siouxsie Sioux (Siouxsie and the Banshees, The Creatures)
- Skin (musician) (Skunk Anansie)
- Grace Slick (Jefferson Airplane, Jefferson Starship, Starship)
- Tara Slone (Joydrop)
- Jen Smith (Dub Narcotic Sound System)
- Patti Smith
- Shawnee Smith
- Carly Smithson (We Are the Fallen)
- Patty Smyth (Scandal)
- Azalia Snail
- Jill Sobule
- Soko
- Marla Sokoloff (Smitten)
- Louisa Solomon (The Shondes)
- Donita Sparks (L7)
- Ronnie Spector (The Ronettes)
- Regina Spektor
- Pamela Spence
- Sharleen Spiteri (Texas)
- Dusty Springfield
- Adalita Srsen (Magic Dirt)
- Becky Stark (Lavender Diamond)
- Alison Statton (Young Marble Giants, Weekend)
- Daria Stavrovich (Slot, Nuki)
- Michael "Micki" Steele (The Runaways, The Bangles}
- Gwen Stefani (No Doubt)
- Juanita Stein (Howling Bells)
- Marnie Stern
- Laura Stoica
- Linda Strawberry
- Re Styles (The Tubes)
- Poly Styrene (X-Ray Spex)
- Alison Sudol (A Fine Frenzy)
- Lacey Sturm (Flyleaf)
- Svetlana Surganova
- Rachel Sweet
- Skye Sweetnam
- Sylvaine

== T ==
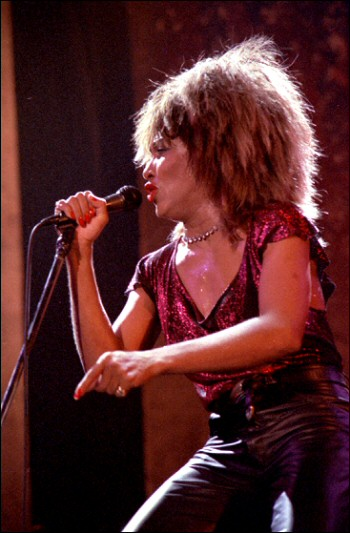
Tina Turner

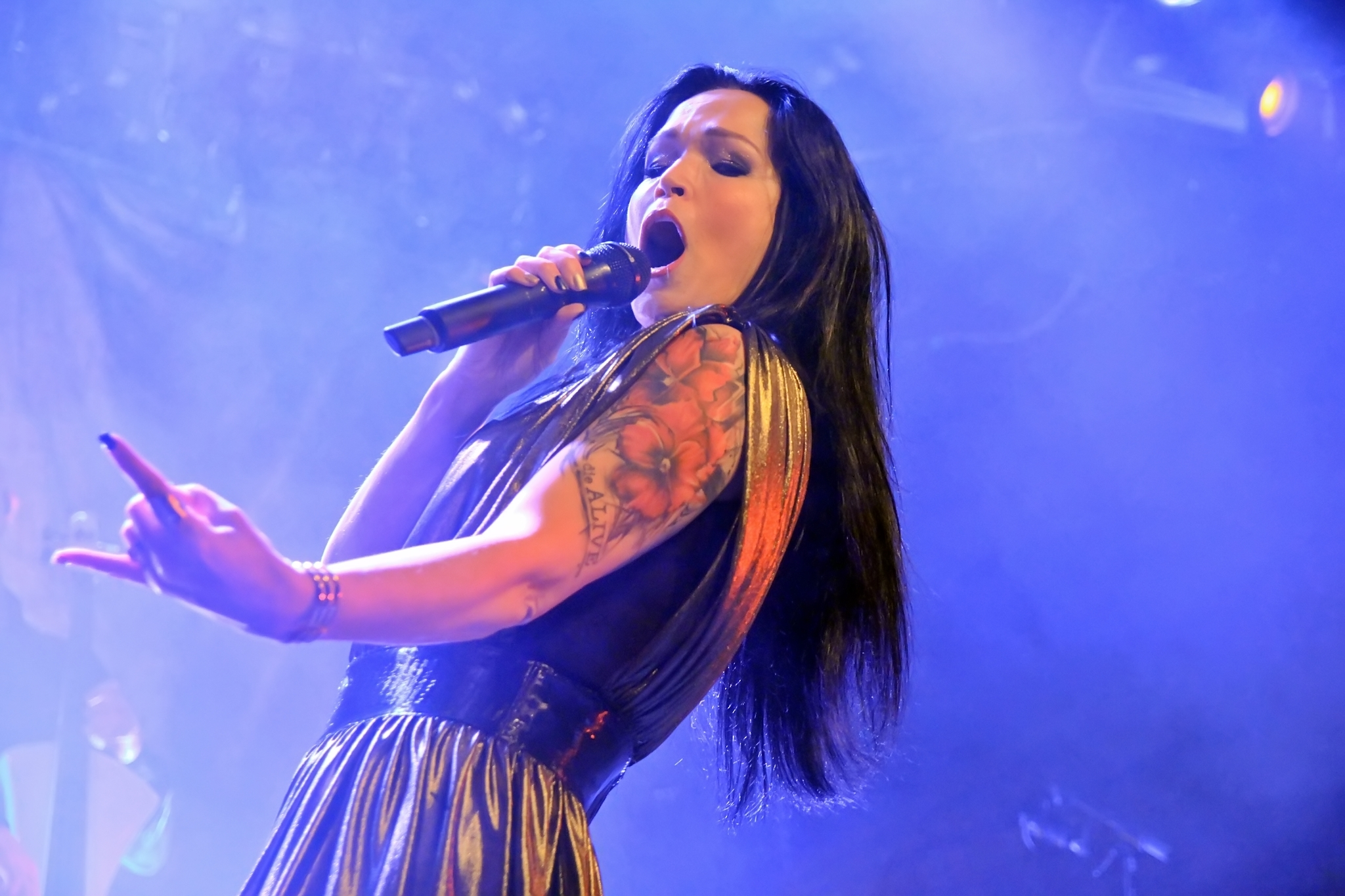
Tarja Turunen

- Koko Taylor
- Maria Taylor (Azure Ray, Now It's Overhead)
- Susan Tedeschi
- Özlem Tekin
- Keiko Terada (Show-Ya)
- Texas Terri
- Tanita Tikaram
- Sister Rosetta Tharpe
- Kristy Thirsk (Delerium, Rose Chronicles)
- Sandi Thom
- Irma Thomas
- Linda Thompson
- Tracey Thorn (Everything but the Girl)
- Tiffany
- Mary Timony (Helium, Autoclave, Wild Flag)
- Martina Topley-Bird
- Emilíana Torrini
- Rachel Trachtenburg (Trachtenburg Family Slideshow Players)
- Sisely Treasure (Shiny Toy Guns)
- Lindsey Troy (Deap Vally)
- Jen Trynin
- Anna Tsuchiya
- Corin Tucker (Sleater-Kinney)
- KT Tunstall
- Fatma Turgut
- Tina Turner
- Tarja Turunen
- Bonnie Tyler
- Judie Tzuke

== U ==
- Ari Up (The Slits, New Age Steppers)
- Carrie Underwood

== V ==
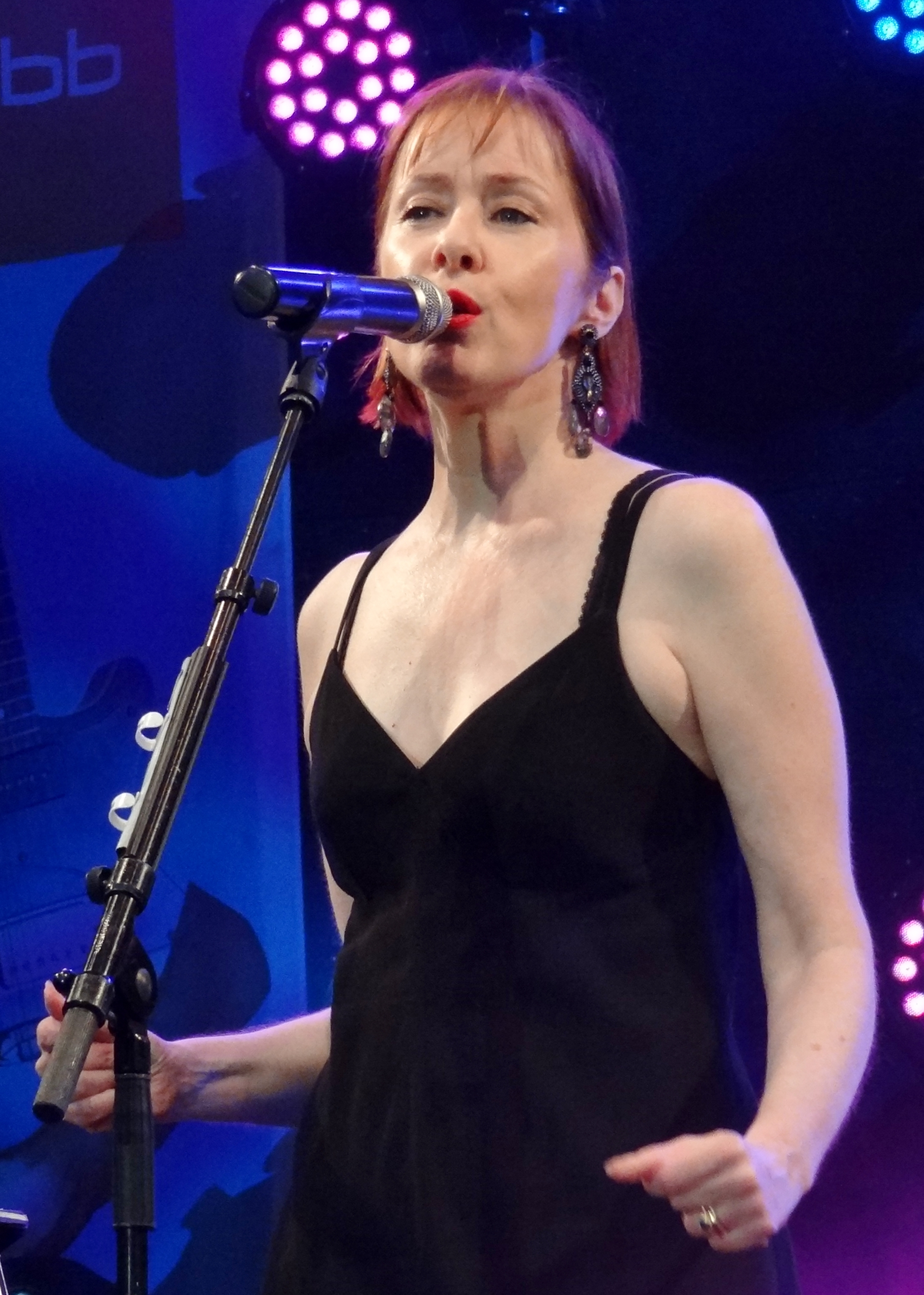
Suzanne Vega

- Tobi Vail (Bikini Kill)
- Francisca Valenzuela
- Tomiko Van (Do As Infinity)
- Marijne van der Vlugt (Salad, Cowboy Racer)
- Anneke van Giersbergen (The Gathering)
- Tara VanFlower (Lycia)
- Cherry Vanilla
- Suzanne Vega
- Julieta Venegas
- Mariska Veres (Shocking Blue)
- Holly Beth Vincent (Holly and the Italians)
- Julia Volkova

== W ==
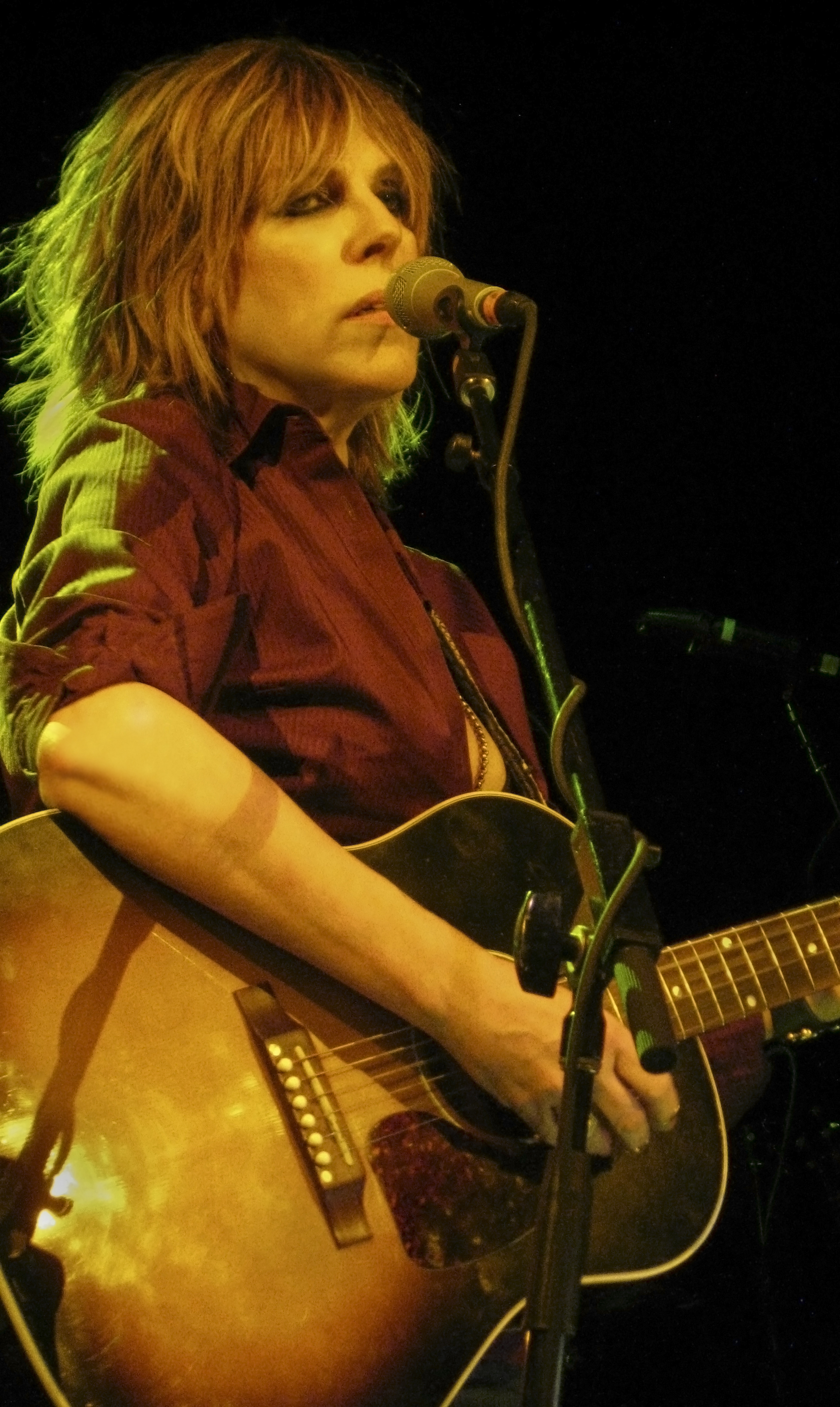
Lucinda Williams

Shannon Wright

- Wendy Waldman
- Mary Weiss (The Shangri-Las)
- Florence Welch (Florence and the Machine)
- Louise Wener (Sleeper)
- Silje Wergeland (The Gathering, Octavia Sperati)
- Tina Weymouth (Talking Heads, Tom Tom Club)
- Emily Jane White
- Katie White (The Ting Tings)
- Meg White (The White Stripes)
- Jane Wiedlin (The Go-Go's)
- Toyah Willcox
- Kim Wilde
- Tess Wiley (Sixpence None the Richer)
- Enid Williams (Girlschool)
- Hayley Williams (Paramore)
- Lucinda Williams
- Wendy O. Williams (Plasmatics)
- Ann Wilson (Heart)
- Cindy Wilson (The B-52's)
- Kaia Wilson (Adickdid, Team Dresch, The Butchies)
- Nancy Wilson (Heart)
- Karin Wistrand (Lolita Pop)
- Whitney Wolanin
- Allison Wolfe (Bratmobile, Partyline)
- Jen Wood (The Postal Service, Tattle Tale)
- Holly Woods (Toronto)
- D'arcy Wretzky (The Smashing Pumpkins)
- Shannon Wright

== Y ==
- Naoko Yamano (Shonen Knife)
- Rachael Yamagata
- Kim Yoon-ah (Jaurim)
- Ella Yelich-O'Connor (Lorde)
- Astrid Young

== Z ==
- Pia Zadora
- Mary Lu Zahalan
- Mia Zapata (The Gits)
- Thalia Zedek (Live Skull)
- Zemfira
- Zola Jesus

== See also ==
- Lead vocalist
- List of female heavy metal singers

== Sources ==
- Zeiss, Mary S.; et al. Encyclopedia of Women in Today's World. Sage Publications, Inc. ISBN 978-1-4129-7685-5
- Thomson Liz; et al. New Women in Rock. Omnibus Press 1982. ISBN 0-7119-0055-8
