= Where Are They Now? (American TV series) =

- Narrated by: James Curreri
- Country of origin: United States
- Original language: English
- No. of episodes: 56

Original release
- Network: VH1
- Release: June 7, 1999 – November 28, 2002

Where Are They Now? is a television series on VH1 that featured past celebrities and updated on their current professional and personal status. Each episode was dedicated to another genre (from kid stars to stars of Aaron Spelling's notable productions to controversial news figures).

Though not always in sequence, some episodes were a continuation of the motif of episodes from the past. Those episodes sometimes (but not always) had Roman numerals in their title to signify their sequel status.

== Episode list ==
=== Season 1 ===
1. One-Hit Wonders
2. Saturday Night Fever
3. Signature Songs
4. Saturday Night Fever II
5. Rockin' Classics
6. On Ice
7. Superheroes
8. Horror Movie Stars

=== Season 2 ===
1. Music Movie Stars
2. New Wave
3. Musicians
4. Kid Stars
5. Notorious & Newsworthy
6. Hair Bands
7. Totally 80s
8. Video Vixens
9. Child Stars
10. Classic Rock
11. British Invasion
12. Bad Boys Of Rock
13. The Rocky Horror Picture...
14. Teen Idols
15. The 80s
16. The 80s II
17. The Cowsills
18. The Big Chill
19. TV Hunks
20. TV Bombshells
21. This Is Spinal Tap
22. Viewer's Choice
23. Woodstock
24. Video Vixens II

=== Season 3 ===
1. Bad Boys Of Rock II
2. American Graffiti
3. Classic Rock II
4. '80s Teen Idols
5. The 80s III
6. 90210, Melrose & More
7. The 80s IV
8. '70s Teen Idols
9. AM Classics
10. Hair Bands II
11. Girls of Grease
12. Grease
13. Guys of Grease
14. Guilty Pleasures
15. Girls, Girls, Girls
16. Girls Night Out
17. Dance
18. Disco
19. Disco Kings & Queens
20. Episode 20
21. Ford Supermodels
22. Girl Power
23. Disco II
24. Girlie Show
