= Harry Crews (band) =

American hardcore punk/crossover thrash band

- Origin: New York City, United States
- Genres: No wave, hardcore punk, crossover thrash, thrashcore
- Years active: 1987–1990
- Labels: Widowspeak
- Past members: Lydia Lunch (guitar); Kim Gordon (bass); Sadie Mae (drums; real name Lisa Timocich)

Harry Crews was an American, short-lived no wave-influenced hardcore punk and crossover thrash supergroup, made up of Lydia Lunch (guitar), Kim Gordon (bass), and Sadie Mae (drums). The band was only musically active in 1988, and only officially produced and released one album, Naked in Garden Hills. The album was released in 1989 and was a compilation of live recordings played at clubs in London, England, and Austria. Shortly after the release of the album the band split up, due to their involvement in other bands and projects. The band's name was taken after the author of the same name, hence the album's title being taken from a novel by Crews. The majority of the songs were also named after Crews' various novels. They also covered "(She's in A) Bad Mood" (originally by Gordon's band Sonic Youth), and "Orphans" (originally by Lunch's band Teenage Jesus and the Jerks.)
