= Cindy Jackson =

Aesthetic consultant, author and television personality

- Born: 1957 (age 67–68)
- Occupation(s): aesthetic consultant, author, television personality
- Website: www.cindyjackson.com

Cindy Jackson is an aesthetic consultant, author and television personality.

== Biography ==
Jackson is British-American based in England since 1977. ABC News reported in 2011 that Jackson had undergone a former world-record 52 cosmetic treatments, including tooth whitening, filler injections, AHA peels, Botox, face-lifts and liposuction," among others, with a total value of over $60,000. A member of Mensa, Jackson has stated that the operations she has undergone have changed her life.

== Bibliography ==
- Jackson, Cindy (2023). How Not To Get Botched. ISBN 978-0-9539068-2-6. Available only from cindyjackson.com
- Jackson, Cindy (2017). Cosmetic Surgery & Anti-Aging Secrets. ISBN 978-0-9539068-1-9. Archived from the original on 2015-07-19. Out of print.
- Jackson, Cindy (2002). Living Doll. Metro Books. ISBN 978-1-84358-049-2. Out of print.
