= Joanna Dean =

American singer

Joanna Dean (born Joanna Dean Jacobs) is a singer songwriter from Tennessee. She had a successful career as backup singer and musician for many acts, starting with James Brown at the age of 18. She recorded for CBS/Sony records before she recorded for Polygram records. Her first record for Polygram was recorded in Memphis at Ardent studios with Eli Ball and James Hampton. She released the album Misbehavin in 1988, with her band Big Noise. The first single was "Kiss This" filmed live at The Roxy in New York and featured James Belushi as a bouncer. After a tour of Europe, she released "Ready For Saturday Night". The video was shot in Memphis, and starred numerous local celebrities. The videos aired on MTV and VH-1. Compared to Janis Joplin and Bonnie Raitt she received good credits. She opened for Johnny Winter, AC/DC and other metal acts with Big Noise. With the band Bad Romance she released the album Code of Honor in 1990. She had a record deal with Polydor. She recorded and performed with Cinderella front man, Tom Keifer.
