= L7 discography =

- Studio albums: 7
- EPs: 1
- Compilation albums: 3
- Singles: 12
- Music videos: 12

This is the discography of the American rock band L7.

L7 was originally formed in 1985 by Donita Sparks and Suzi Gardner, both of whom sang and played guitar. The band's early lineup consisted of bassist Jennifer Finch and drummer Roy Koutsky. After their debut album, the band recruited Demetra Plakas as their permanent drummer. This lineup continued through their albums Smell the Magic (1990), released on Subpop records, and Bricks Are Heavy (1992) and Hungry for Stink (1994), both released on Slash. In 1996, Finch elected to leave the band to attend college and Greta Brink replaced her as the bass player for The Beauty Process: Triple Platinum, the third and final album released through Slash, in 1997. Gail Greenwood took over on bass for the album Slap-Happy (1999), which was produced by L7's own company, Wax Tadpole Records. After this, there were further changes to the lineup when Greenwood left the band, to be replaced by Janis Tanaka on bass. The group announced it was on an indefinite hiatus in 2001.

L7 reunited in 2014, including Jennifer Finch. The following year, they performed in Europe and North America. The reception was positive and the band continued to tour in 2016 and 2017. In 2016, a Kickstarter-funded documentary film, titled L7: Pretend We're Dead, directed by Sarah Price, was screened at film festivals and later released in the US and abroad.

In September 2017, the band issued the single "Dispatch from Mar-a-Lago", their first new song in eighteen years. This song was closely followed by the single "I Came Back to Bitch" in 2018. On May 3, 2019, L7's full-length album Scatter the Rats was released to generally favorable reviews.

== Albums ==
=== Studio albums ===
List of studio albums, with selected chart positions and certifications
Title	Details	Peak chart positions					Notes
Title	Details	US	US Heat	AUS	SWE	UK	Notes
L7	Released: 1988; Label: Epitaph	—	—	—	—	—	
Smell the Magic	Released: September 1, 1990; Label: Sub Pop	—	—	—	—	—	Reissued in 1991 with three extra songs
Bricks Are Heavy	Released: April 14, 1992; Label: Slash	160	1	47	—	24	
Hungry for Stink	Released: July 12, 1994; Label: Slash	117	2	57	47	26	
The Beauty Process: Triple Platinum	Released: February 25, 1997; Label: Slash	172	12	—	—	—	First album without bassist Jennifer Finch
Slap-Happy	Released: August 24, 1999; Label: Wax Tadpole	—	—	—	—	—	
Scatter the Rats	Released: May 3, 2019; Label: Blackheart	—	19	—	—	—	

=== Compilations ===
Title	Details	Notes
The Slash Years	Released: May 2, 2000; Label: Slash	Compilation of popular songs from 1992–1997
Fast and Frightening	Released: September 16, 2016; Label: Easy Action	2-CD set of rarities, covers, compilation tracks + radio session + live set
Pretend We're Dead – Best Of	Released: March 2019; Label: Slash	Compilation of popular songs from 1992–1997
L7: Wargasm – The Slash Years	Released: 2021; Label: Slash	3-CD box set of releases under Slash

=== Live albums ===
Title	Details	Notes
Live: Omaha to Osaka	Released: December 15, 1998; Label: Man's Ruin	
Hollywood Palladium	Released: November 5, 2014; Label: Easy Action	Recorded May 17, 1991, at the Hollywood Palladium
Detroit	Released: January 13, 2017; Label: Easy Action	
Wireless	Released: February 2, 2018; Label: Easy Action	Recorded in Brisbane in 1992 for Triple J's Live at the Wireless radio programme

== Singles ==
Title	Year	Peak chart positions			Album
Title	Year	US Alt.	AUS	UK	Album
"Shove"	1990	—	—	—	Smell the Magic
"Pretend We're Dead"	1992	8	50	21	Bricks Are Heavy
"Everglade"	1992	—	85	27	Bricks Are Heavy
"Monster"	1992	—	—	33	Bricks Are Heavy
"Slide" (live) (split single with Faith No More)	1992	—	—	—	Non-album single
"Andres"	1994	20	86	34	Hungry for Stink
"Drama"	1997	—	—	—	The Beauty Process: Triple Platinum
"Off the Wagon"	1997	—	—	—	The Beauty Process: Triple Platinum
"Freeway"	1999	—	—	—	Slap-Happy
"Mantra Down"	1999	—	—	—	Slap-Happy
"Dispatch from Mar-a-Lago"	2017	—	—	—	Non-album singles
"I Came Back to Bitch"	2018	—	—	—	Non-album singles
"Burn Baby / Fighting the Crave"	2019	—	—	—	Scatter the Rats
"Fake Friends / Witchy Burn"	2020	—	—	—	Non-album singles
"Zacatecas Music Session, Vol. 7" (with Zacatecas Music)	2023	—	—	—	Non-album singles
"Cooler Than Mars"	2023	—	—	—	Non-album singles

== Videos ==
- 1990 – "Just Like Me" (from Smell the Magic)
- 1991 – "Fast and Frightening" (from Smell the Magic)
- 1992 – "Pretend We're Dead" (from Bricks are Heavy)
- 1992 – "Everglade" (from Bricks are Heavy)
- 1992 – "Monster" (from Bricks are Heavy)
- 1994 – "Andres" (from Hungry for Stink)
- 1994 – "Stuck Here Again" (from Hungry for Stink)
- 1999 – L7: The Beauty Process – documentary about the band by Krist Novoselic
- 2016 – L7: Pretend We're Dead (single)
- 2018 – "I Came Back to Bitch" (single)
- 2019 – "Burn Baby"(from Scatter the Rats)
- 2019 – "Stadium West" (from Scatter the Rats)
- 2023 - "Cooler Than Mars" (non-album single)

== Other appearances ==
Year	Compilation	Track
1988	The Melting Plot	"Yummy Yummy" (Ohio Express cover)
1989	Radio Tokyo Tapes Volume 4: Women	"Sweet Sex" (cover of Flipper's "Sex Bomb")
1989	Gabba Gabba Hey: A Tribute to the Ramones	"Suzy Is a Headbanger"
1989	Every Band Has a Shonen Knife Who Loves Them	"Baggs"
1990	"Shove" single	"Fast" (early version of "Fast and Frightening")
1990	Teriyaki Asthma	"Bloodstains" (Agent Orange cover)
1992	"Pretend We're Dead" single	"Lopsided Head" & "Used to Love Him"
1992	Virus 100	"Let's Lynch the Landlord" (Dead Kennedys cover)
1992	Maneater (live in Waterfront bootleg)	"She's a Lost Cause"
1994	Serial Mom Soundtrack	"Gas Chamber"
1995	Spirit of '73: Rock for Choice	"Cherry Bomb" (with Joan Jett)
1995	The Jerky Boys Soundtrack	"Hanging on the Telephone" (The Nerves cover)
1996	Twisted Willie	"Three Days" (Willie Nelson cover with Waylon Jennings)
1996	A Small Circle of Friends	"Lion's Share" (Germs cover)
1997	"Off the Wagon" single	"Guera" & "Punk Broke (My Heart)"
1997	Live: Omaha to Osaka	"Pattylean" & "El Wahtusi"
1997	I Know What You Did Last Summer Soundtrack	"This Ain't the Summer of Love" (Blue Öyster Cult cover)
2000	Free the West Memphis 3	"Boys in Black"

== Compilation appearances ==
Year	Compilation	Track
1988	Tantrum	"Bite the Wax Tadpole"
1990	The Big One: City of L.A. Power	"American Society"
1991	International Pop Underground	"Packin' a Rod"
1992	Pet Sematary II Soundtrack	"Shitlist"
1994	Alternative NRG	"Shitlist"
1994	Natural Born Killers Soundtrack	"Shitlist"
1994	The Grunge Years	"Shove"
1995	Tank Girl Soundtrack	"Shove"
1996	Foxfire Soundtrack	"Shirley"
1999	Stoned Again! – A Bong Load Records Collection	"Stick to the Plan"
2004	Grand Theft Auto: San Andreas Official Soundtrack Boxset	"Pretend We're Dead"
2008	Rock Band 2	"Pretend We're Dead"
