= The Slash Years =

Greatest hits album by L7
- Released: May 2, 2000
- Recorded: 1992–1997
- Genre: Rock
- Length: 42:28
- Label: Slash
- Producer: L7; Butch Vig

L7 chronology
Slap-Happy (1999)	The Slash Years (2000)	Scatter the Rats (2019)

Professional ratings
Review scores
Source	Rating
Allmusic	4/5 stars

The Slash Years is the first best of album released by rock band L7. It comprises L7's greatest hits released on Slash Records. It would be the band's final release until Scatter the Rats was released in 2019. A 3 CD box set with the similar name Wargasm – The Slash Years was released in 2021.

== Track listing ==
No.	Title	Length
1.	"Pretend We're Dead"	3:55
2.	"Mr. Integrity"	4:08
3.	"Monster"	2:56
4.	"Everglade"	3:16
5.	"Andres"	3:03
6.	"Fuel My Fire"	3:46
7.	"Freak Magnet"	3:14
8.	"Can I Run"	3:54
9.	"Bad Things"	3:12
10.	"Off the Wagon"	3:26
11.	"Moonshine"	3:23
12.	"Bitter Wine"	4:15
Total length:		42:28

- Songs 1–4 appear on Bricks Are Heavy (1992)
- Songs 5–8 appear on Hungry for Stink (1994)
- Songs 9–12 appear on The Beauty Process: Triple Platinum (1997)
