= Slap-Happy =

Studio album by L7
- Released: August 24, 1999
- Studios: Synical Labs, PCS, Sound City, de Prume, Sonors, and King (all in Los Angeles)
- Genres: Alternative metal, punk rock
- Length: 38:44
- Labels: Wax Tadpole, Bong Load
- Producer: L7, Brian Haught

L7 chronology
Live: Omaha to Osaka (1998)	Slap-Happy (1999)	The Slash Years (2000)

Slap-Happy is the sixth studio album by the American rock band L7. It was released on August 24, 1999, by Bong Load Records in collaboration with Wax Tadpole Records, an independent record label that the band formed after being dropped by Reprise Records in 1997. L7 recorded the album as a trio formed by founding members Donita Sparks and Suzi Gardner, and longtime drummer Demetra Plakas, following the departure of bassist Gail Greenwood. It was made with a low budget and produced by the band and their friend Brian Haught.

Unlike previous L7 albums, Slap-Happy features more varied and slower-paced songs, some of which borrowing elements from other genres like hip hop. Upon release, the album received generally mixed reviews from music critics and suffered dismal sales partly due to the poor distribution and support by Bong Load. Some critics found the album predictable and too similar to previous L7 albums, but others highlighted certain songs for their nifty musical style.

== Background and recording ==
Slap-Happy is the follow-up to L7's 1997 album The Beauty Process: Triple Platinum. Like its predecessors, The Beauty Process was released by Slash Records in collaboration with Reprise, a major record label owned by the Warner Music Group. After the release of The Beauty Process, bassist Gail Greenwood, who replaced founding member Jennifer Finch in 1996, left the band due to uncoordinated schedules; Greenwood was rooted in Rhode Island, while L7 was based in Los Angeles, California. L7 would then continue as a trio formed by founding members Donita Sparks and Suzi Gardner, and longtime drummer Demetra Plakas. In 1998, the band released a live album, Live: Omaha to Osaka, through the independent record label Man's Ruin Records.

After being dropped by Reprise in 1997, L7 was interested in maintaining an independent, do it yourself approach. Sparks and Gardner explained that the band wanted to release an album in 1999, and if they opted for another major label opportunity, they would certainly have to wait until 2000 for a release slot. As a result, the band signed a deal with Bong Load Records and formed Wax Tadpole Records, an independent record label named after the first song of their self-titled debut album. Although the band had left the indie music scene before due to distribution problems, Sparks said that she would be watching the Bong Load deal to ensure the distribution of Slap-Happy, noting that "there's nothing more painful to tour for a record and the fans not being able to find your record in stores."

Most of the songs on Slap-Happy were recorded before the band decided to form Wax Tadpole. Sparks and Gardner wrote all the songs, usually at Gardner's home, even though the whole group contributed to the album in one form or another. Unlike its predecessor, Slap-Happy was made with a low budget. According to Sparks, "We utilized a lot of home studios, did a lot of our tracking ourselves, used a lot of first takes. I think there's a lot of life in this record, and yet I think when we started our own label we were fearing having to take a major step down in production because of the financial aspects." The album was produced by Brian Haught, a friend of the band who let the band use his studio "just out of the kindness of his heart." It was recorded and mixed at Synical Labs, PCS Studios, Sound City, de Prume Studios, Sonors Studios, and King Sound and Pictures in Los Angeles. Audio mastering took place at Precision Mastering in Los Angeles.

== Music and lyrics ==
Slap-Happy was considered more varied than previous L7 albums. Although the album features several songs with aggressive guitar riffs that are reminiscent of the band's previous releases, as seen in the tracks "On My Rockin' Machine", "Long Green" and "Mantra Down", it also contains slow-paced and guitar-driven ballads like "Livin' Large" and "Freezer Burn". The former song was described by Marc Weingarten of Rolling Stone as "a kind of rallying cry for the indie-rock underclass", while the latter was seen as a melodic song that "juxtaposes harsh words delivered in mellow, floating vocals." Slap-Happy also contains songs that borrow elements from genres other than rock. For example, the song "Little One" contains elements of both polka and country music. As Sparks noted, "We're all into all kinds of music, but I listen to very little rock, actually. Our approach was to pretty much do what we've always done, but we're not concerned with sticking with a particular style. There's diversity in our songwriting."

The track "Freeway", which was referred by the band as "the feel bad dance hit of the year", features a hip hop-influenced style with sampled voices. Its lyrics were inspired by an article in Los Angeles Times about a man who stopped his truck on a Los Angeles freeway and committed suicide after lighting his truck on fire and obstructing the traffic. The sampled voices were taken from Casio keyboards that Sparks and Suzi had previously bought at a Guitar Center store. The album features humorous and irreverent lyrics. Sparks noted that many songs are "double-sided. There's a lot of masking of fuck-you's going on." She also said that Slap-Happy was "almost a spit in the eye of our label, who had dropped us. It was like, 'Fuck you, we’re going to make another record anyway, so fuck off!' Some of the writing on [the] record is very angry, because we were pissed." The opening track "Crackpot Baby", which is the first L7 song that features a three-part vocal harmony, features "unforgiving lyrics about plastic L.A. types", while "Stick to the Plan" is about a "chronic masturbator / With love in his eyes".

== Promotion and release ==
Slap-Happy was released on August 24, 1999, on vinyl and CD. A different version of "Freeway" was released by the online record label Atomic Pop in February 1999. To promote the album, a plane flew over the crowd during the Lilith Fair concert tour at the Rose Bowl stadium in Pasadena, California, on July 17, 1999, with a banner that read: "Bored? Tired? Try L7." The following day, an airplane towed a banner over the crowd during the Warped Tour at the Stone Pony lot in Asbury Park, New Jersey. The banner read: "Warped Needs More Beaver, Love L7." The band supported the album with a U.S. tour that started on August 15 in San Diego, California, and ended on September 24 in Cleveland Heights, Ohio. Bassist Janis Tanaka, formerly of the San Francisco band Stone Fox, joined the band as part of the touring group. The band also toured across Europe in 2000. Unlike previous L7 albums, Slap-Happy did not chart in either the US or the UK. In 2008, Sparks revealed that the album suffered dismal sales partly due to the poor distribution and support by Bong Load.

== Critical reception ==
Professional ratings
Review scores
Source	Rating
AllMusic	2.5/5 stars
Alternative Press	3/5 stars
The Austin Chronicle	2/5 stars
Christgau's Consumer Guide	(2-star Honorable Mention)
Daily Nebraskan	B
Encyclopedia of Popular Music	3/5 stars
Entertainment Weekly	B
Pitchfork	2.0/10
Q	3/5 stars
Rolling Stone	3/5 stars
Spin	4/10

Upon release, Slap-Happy received generally mixed reviews from music critics. Marc Weingarten of Rolling Stone praised the band for "doing punk metal right", commenting that Slap-Happy "is all hopped-up, pared-down riffage with no apologies or gratuitous change-ups." Q magazine highlighted the album for its "distinctive punk noise", which "stays roughly the same but evolves enough to be interesting." In contrast, Craig Daniels of Exclaim! criticized the album's sound for being "sterile and lacking in energy" compared to previous L7 albums, but overall considered Slap-Happy to be "a fairly solid record".

Entertainment Weekly editor Natasha Stovall highlighted the album's different approach, stating that although the "neo-Go-Go's vibe" of songs like "Livin' Large" and "Little One" can be disappointing "for those addicted to the ultra-macha-punk throb of L7 watersheds", Slap-Happy's "harmonious pop sweetness" has "a super-catchy, Joan Jett-meets-the-Breeders feel that zestfully floors the accelerator." Jason Hardy of Daily Nebraskan stated similar pros, noting that the album's new style introduced a "groovy" side of L7 that "most probably didn't know existed." AllMusic's Stephen Thomas Erlewine described the album as "a respectable but predictable effort", stating that it "leaves very little lasting impression" even though "a few of the songs hit hard, and the band sounds energetic and muscular."

Not all reviews were favorable, though. Erik Himmelsbach of Spin criticized Slap-Happy for essentially being the same as all of the band's previous albums, commenting "What was once fast and loose and dump now sounds lazy and stupid". Raoul Hernandez of The Austin Chronicle heavily criticized the second half of the album for being "one long, nasal, wise-ass line after wise-ass line from Donita Sparks, who [...] is quickly becoming self-parody." Although the album received a mixed reaction from media outlets, Sparks retrospectively regards Slap-Happy as "a good record", and considers it her third favorite L7 album, behind The Beauty Process and Smell the Magic.

== Track listing ==
All tracks are written by Donita Sparks and Suzi Gardner.

No.	Title	Length
1.	"Crackpot Baby"	2:38
2.	"On My Rockin' Machine"	2:20
3.	"Lackey"	3:01
4.	"Human"	3:00
5.	"Livin' Large"	3:57
6.	"Freeway"	2:42
7.	"Stick to the Plan"	4:59
8.	"War with You"	3:38
9.	"Long Green"	2:41
10.	"Little One"	1:41
11.	"Freezer Burn"	4:06
12.	"Mantra Down"	4:01
Total length:		38:44

== Personnel ==
Credits are adapted from the album's liner notes.

L7

- Donita Sparks – guitar, bass, vocals, production, art direction, photography
- Suzi Gardner – guitar, vocals, production, art direction
- Demetra Plakas – drums, percussion, production, art direction

Technical personnel

- Brian Haught – production, mixing, engineer
- Tom Rothrock – mixing
- Rob Schnapf – mixing
- Joe Barresi – mixing
- Billy Bowers – mixing, engineer
- Don C. Tyler – mastering
- Gail Greenwood – bass on "Freezer Burn", engineer
- Ivan de Prume – engineer
- Jeff Skelton – assistant engineer
- Bryan Brown – photography, engineer
- Viggo Mortensen – photography
- Kirk Canning – art direction
