= Live: Omaha to Osaka =

Live album by L7
- Released: 15 December 1998
- Recorded: 3 September 1997 – 23 April 1998
- Genre: Grunge
- Label: Man's Ruin

L7 chronology
| The Beauty Process: Triple Platinum (1997) | Live: Omaha to Osaka (1998) | Slap-Happy (1999) |

Professional ratings
Review scores
| Source | Rating |
|---|---|
| Allmusic | 3/5 stars |
| Robert Christgau | (1-star Honorable Mention) |

Live: Omaha to Osaka is the first live album by L7. The album was recorded at clubs in Omaha, Nebraska, (first 11 songs) and Osaka, Japan, (the rest) hence its name.

== Track listing ==
| No. | Title | Length |
|---|---|---|
| 1. | "L7 Medley/Overture" | 6:41 |
| 2. | "Bad Things" | 3:22 |
| 3. | "Must Have More" | 4:06 |
| 4. | "Deathwish" | 3:01 |
| 5. | "Slide" | 4:07 |
| 6. | "Bitter Wine" | 4:32 |
| 7. | "Drama" | 4:10 |
| 8. | "Non-Existent Patricia" | 4:17 |
| 9. | "Pattylean" | 2:53 |
| 10. | "El Whatusi" | 3:54 |
| 11. | "Shitlist" | 3:01 |
| 12. | "Andres" | 3:08 |
| 13. | "Fast and Frightening" | 3:41 |
| 14. | "Off the Wagon" | 2:56 |
| 15. | "Little One" | 2:09 |
| 16. | "Lorenza, Giada, Alessandra" | 5:15 |

== Personnel ==
- Donita Sparks – lead vocals, guitar
- Suzi Gardner – guitar, backing vocals
- Gail Greenwood – bass, backing vocals
- Demetra Plakas – drums, backing vocals
