= Wax Tadpole Records =

Wax Tadpole Records was a label created by the members of L7 in 1997. The band created the label under Bong Load Records when they were dropped by their previous record label, Reprise Records, and used it to release their 1999 studio album Slap-Happy. The label's name was taken from "Bite The Wax Tadpole", the first song on their self-titled 1988 album. It is not certain whether any other artists were signed to the label.
