= Monster (L7 song) =

Single by L7

from the album Bricks Are Heavy
- B-side: "Used to Love Him"
- Released: 1992
- Recorded: Various: Smart Studios; (Madison, WI); Sound City Studios; (Van Nuys, CA)
- Genre: Grunge; alternative metal
- Length: 2:59
- Label: Slash
- Songwriter: Suzi Gardner
- Producers: L7; Butch Vig

L7 singles chronology
"Everglade" (1992)	"Monster" (1992)	"Andres" (1994)

"Monster" is a song by the American rock group L7. It was released in 1992 by Slash Records as a single in support of their third album, Bricks Are Heavy (1992).

== Track listing ==
- UK 7" single (LASH 38)
1. "Monster" (Suzi Gardner) – 2:59
2. "Used to Love Him" (Guns N' Roses cover) (Steven Adler, Duff McKagan, Axl Rose, Slash, Izzy Stradlin) – 2:14
- UK CD single (LASCD 38)
1. "Monster" (Suzi Gardner) – 2:59
2. "Used to Love Him" (Guns N' Roses cover) (Steven Adler, Duff McKagan, Axl Rose, Slash, Izzy Stradlin) – 2:14
3. "Diet Pill" (Donita Sparks) – 4:21

== Charts ==
Chart (1992)	Peak position
UK Singles (OCC)	33
UK Airplay (Music Week)	49

== Personnel ==
Adapted from the Monster liner notes.

L7

- Jennifer Finch – bass guitar
- Suzi Gardner – lead vocals, electric guitar
- Demetra Plakas – drums
- Donita Sparks – electric guitar

Production and additional personnel

- Mr. Colson – engineering
- Steve Marker – engineering
- Clare Muller – cover art
- Butch Vig – production, recording
- Howie Weinberg – mastering

== Release history ==
Region	Date	Label	Format	Catalog
United Kingdom	1992	Slash	CD, LP	LASH 38
