= Shove (song) =

Single by L7

from the album Smell the Magic
- B-side: "Packin' a Rod"
- Released: 1 January 1990
- Recorded: 1989
- Studio: Reciprocal Recording, Seattle, WA
- Genre: Grunge
- Length: 3:10
- Label: Sub Pop
- Songwriters: Suzi Gardner, Donita Sparks

L7 singles chronology
| "Shove" (1990) | "Pretend We're Dead" (1992) |

"Shove" is a 1990 song by the American rock band L7, from the album Smell the Magic. The cover photo was shot by music photographer Charles Peterson.

== Track listing ==
1. "Shove" (Gardner, Sparks)
2. "Packin' a Rod" (Morrow)

== Accolades ==
| Year | Publication | Country | Article | Rank |
|---|---|---|---|---|
| 1990 | Spex | (Germany) | Singles of the Year | 37 |
| 2014 | Robert Dimery | United Kingdom | 1,001 Songs You Must Hear Before You Die | * |

== Personnel ==
- Donita Sparks – guitar,
- Suzi Gardner – lead vocals, guitar
- Jennifer Finch – bass guitar
- Demetra Plakas – drums
