= Everglade (song) =

Single by L7

from the album Bricks Are Heavy
- B-side: "Freak Magnet"
- Released: 1992
- Recorded: Smart Studios (Madison, Wisconsin); Sound City Studios (Van Nuys, California)
- Genre: Grunge; alternative metal
- Length: 3:18
- Label: Slash
- Songwriter(s): Jennifer Finch, Daniel Rey
- Producer(s): L7, Butch Vig

L7 singles chronology
"Pretend We're Dead" (1992)	"Everglade" (1992)	"Monster" (1992)

"Everglade" is a song by the American rock group L7. It was released as a single in support of their third album Bricks Are Heavy.

== Track listing ==
UK 7" single (LASH 36)

1. "Everglade" (Jennifer Finch, Daniel Rey) – 3:17
2. "Freak Magnet" (Suzi Gardner, Donita Sparks) – 3:14

UK CD single (LASCD 36)

1. "Everglade" (Jennifer Finch, Daniel Rey) – 3:19
2. "Freak Magnet" (Suzi Gardner, Donita Sparks) – 3:16
3. "Scrap" (Donita Sparks, Brett Gurewitz) – 2:55

== Personnel ==
Adapted from the "Everglade" liner notes.

L7

- Jennifer Finch – lead vocals, bass guitar
- Suzi Gardner – electric guitar
- Demetra Plakas – drums
- Donita Sparks – electric guitar

Production and additional personnel

- Coop – cover art
- Mr. Colson – engineering
- Steve Marker – engineering
- Butch Vig – production, recording
- Howie Weinberg – mastering

== Charts ==
Chart performance for "Everglade"
Chart (1992)	Peak position
Australia (ARIA)	85
UK Singles (OCC)	27

== Release history ==
Release history and formats for "Everglade"
Region	Date	Label	Format	Catalog
United Kingdom	1992	Slash	CD, LP	LASH 36
Australia	1992	Slash	CD	D 11257
