= The Grunge Years =

Compilation album by Sub Pop Records
- Released: 1991
- Genre: Grunge
- Length: 45:36
- Label: Sub Pop
- Producer: Jack Endino

Sub Pop Records chronology
Sub Pop 200 (1988)	The Grunge Years (1991)	Never Mind the Molluscs (1993)

Professional ratings
Review scores
Source	Rating
Allmusic	4.5/5 stars

The Grunge Years is a compilation album of songs by notable grunge bands released by Sub Pop in 1991. As indicated by the cover of the album, it was limited to a pressing of 500,000 copies. Several of these songs were also released as singles by Sub Pop.

== Track listing ==
1. "Dive" - Nirvana
2. "Shove" - L7
3. "Stumblin' Man" - Tad
4. "Red Head Walking" - Beat Happening
5. "Ugly Sunday" - Mark Lanegan
6. "Change Has Come" - Screaming Trees
7. "Tomorrow" - Fluid
8. "Retarded" - Afghan Whigs
9. "House" - Babes in Toyland
10. "Come to Mind" - Mudhoney
11. "Long Black Veil" - The Walkabouts
12. "Between the Eyes" - Love Battery
13. "Saddle Tramp" - Dickless

== See also ==
- Sub Pop Releases
