= The Masses Are Asses =

The Masses Are Asses is a quote attributed to Alexander Hamilton and may refer to:

- A 1974 play by Pedro Pietri
- A 1997 song by the punk rock group L7 from the album The Beauty Process: Triple Platinum
