= Andres (song) =

Single by L7

from the album Hungry for Stink
- B-side: "The Bomb"
- Released: 1994
- Recorded: A&M, Hollywood; The Clubhouse, Los Angeles; Sound City, Van Nuys
- Genre: Grunge
- Length: 3:03
- Label: Slash
- Songwriters: Suzi Gardner, Donita Sparks
- Producers: GGGarth, L7

L7 singles chronology
"Monster" (1993)	"Andres" (1994)

"Andres" is a song by the American rock group L7. It was released as a single in support of their fourth album Hungry for Stink. The song is an apology to a friend of the band, Andres, who was hurt by someone they introduced him to.

== In popular culture ==
On October 13, 2009, the song was made available as a downloadable song in the Rock Band digital store.

== Track listing ==
UK 7" single (LASH 48)
No.	Title	Writer(s)	Length
1.	"Andres"	Suzi Gardner, Donita Sparks	3:04
2.	"The Bomb"	Jennifer Finch, Donita Sparks	2:42

UK 12" single (LASCD 48)
No.	Title	Writer(s)	Length
1.	"Andres"	Suzi Gardner, Donita Sparks	3:04
2.	"Stuck in Here"	Suzi Gardner, Donita Sparks	4:58
3.	"The Bomb"	Jennifer Finch, Donita Sparks	2:42
4.	"Shirley"	Jennifer Finch	3:09

UK CD single (LPDJ 1)
No.	Title	Writer(s)	Length
1.	"Andres"	Suzi Gardner, Donita Sparks	3:04
2.	"The Bomb"	Jennifer Finch, Donita Sparks	2:42
3.	"L7 Live Interview"		13:36

== Personnel ==
Adapted from the Andres liner notes.

L7

- Jennifer Finch – bass guitar
- Suzi Gardner – lead vocals, electric guitar
- Demetra Plakas – drums
- Donita Sparks – electric guitar, cover art

Production and additional personnel

- Michael Barbiero – mixing
- GGGarth – production, recording
- L7 – production
- George Marino – mastering

== Charts ==
Chart performance for "Andres"
Chart (1994)	Peak position
Australia (ARIA)	86
UK Singles (OCC)	34
US Alternative Airplay (Billboard)	20

== Release history ==
Release history and formats for "Andres"
Region	Date	Label	Format	Catalog
United Kingdom	1994	Slash	CD, LP	LASH 48
Australia	1994	Liberation	CD	D 11768
