= Pretend We're Dead =

1992 single by L7

Single by L7

from the album Bricks Are Heavy
- B-side: "Shitlist"
- Released: March 23, 1992
- Studio: Smart (Madison, Wisconsin); Sound City (Van Nuys, California)
- Genre: Grunge
- Length: 3:55
- Label: Slash
- Songwriter: Donita Sparks
- Producer: L7, Butch Vig

L7 singles chronology
| "Shove" (1990) | "Pretend We're Dead" (1992) | "Everglade" (1992) |

Music video
- "Pretend We're Dead" on YouTube

"Pretend We're Dead" is a song by American rock band L7 from their third studio album, Bricks Are Heavy. It was written by Donita Sparks. The song was the first single released from Bricks Are Heavy and achieved moderate international success. It spent 20 weeks on the US Billboard Modern Rock Tracks chart, peaking at number eight. It also reached number 21 on the UK Singles Chart and charted in Australia, Belgium, and Finland.

A documentary about L7 directed by Sarah Price and titled L7: Pretend We're Dead was released in 2016. The film covers the band discussing challenges associated with producing the video for "Pretend We're Dead", including a crane failure that injured Suzi Gardner and heavy handed video producers who stifled the creative vision of Sparks.

== Conception ==
Donita Sparks was in her apartment in Echo Park trying to write lyrics to a cassette she had made. She was heartbroken at the time due to a recent breakup, and she says the first thing that came to her was, "I just pretend that you're dead." She did not mean it as wanting her former paramour to be dead but felt that the only way she could get through the breakup was to pretend he was dead. Then, immediately, in her mind, she thought "I'm not writing that. It's just not gonna happen. What about, "pretend we're dead"?" She liked that because playing dead was a children's game, and it also served as a kind of commentary on Reagan/Bush–era apathy.

Sparks stated that there was an unspoken sentiment in the band that love songs were to be avoided. In an interview regarding the early formation of "Pretend We're Dead" Sparks stated "We chose fierceness and humor over vulnerability because we were, you know, navigating challenging waters—women in hard rock. You had to be tough."

== Track listing ==
1. "Pretend We're Dead" (Sparks)
2. "Shitlist" (Sparks)
3. "Lopsided Head"
4. "Mr. Integrity" (Sparks)

== Charts ==
| Chart (1992) | Peak position |
|---|---|
| Australia (ARIA) | 50 |
| Belgium (Ultratop 50 Flanders) | 21 |
| Europe (Eurochart Hot 100) | 61 |
| Finland (Suomen virallinen lista) | 5 |
| UK Singles (Official Charts) | 21 |
| US Modern Rock Tracks (Billboard) | 8 |

== Release history ==
| Region | Date | Format(s) | Label(s) | Ref. |
|---|---|---|---|---|
| United Kingdom | March 23, 1992 | 7-inch vinyl; 12-inch vinyl; CD; cassette | Slash | |
| Australia | May 18, 1992 | CD; cassette | Liberation; Slash | |
| Japan | March 1, 1993 | CD | Slash | |
