= Hungry for Stink =

1994 studio album by L7

Studio album by L7
- Released: July 12, 1994
- Recorded: Winter 1993
- Studios: A&M (Hollywood); Sound City (Los Angeles); The Clubhouse (Los Angeles)
- Genres: Grunge; alternative metal
- Length: 44:43
- Labels: Slash; Reprise
- Producers: L7; GGGarth

L7 chronology
Bricks Are Heavy (1992)	Hungry for Stink (1994)	The Beauty Process: Triple Platinum (1997)

Singles from Hungry for Stink
- 1. "Andres" Released: 1994

Hungry for Stink is the fourth studio album by L7, released in July 1994 by Slash Records. The album peaked at number 117 on the Billboard 200 chart, as well as number 2 on the Heatseekers Albums chart.

"Fuel My Fire" was based on the Cosmic Psychos song "Lost Cause", and was covered by the Prodigy on their 1997 album The Fat of the Land. The Independent reported that the album's name Hungry for Stink was derived from an advert the band saw in Bear Magazine, a gay publication "for and about big hairy men".

== Critical reception ==
Professional ratings
Review scores
Source	Rating
AllMusic	3/5 stars
Chicago Tribune	4/4 stars
Entertainment Weekly	A+
Los Angeles Times	2.5/4 stars
NME	6/10
Q	4/5 stars
Record Collector	4/5 stars
The Rolling Stone Album Guide	3.5/5 stars
Spin Alternative Record Guide	7/10
The Village Voice	A−

In a rave review for Entertainment Weekly, Greg Sandow wrote that whereas L7's earlier albums "were forceful and bratty", Hungry for Stink "is far more sophisticated, with a musical surprise on nearly every track", and cements L7 as "one of the top hard-rocking bands of any kind, gender be damned." Chicago Tribune critic Greg Kot opined that "L7 affirms that it is a great band" with their "strongest batch of songs", while Rolling Stone's Paul Corio praised L7's "smart, hard neopunk" and commented that they "kick inter-gender butt by means of power chords and grunge abandon." In The Village Voice, Robert Christgau said that L7 "reverse the usual evolution" by leaning further into a grunge sound on Hungry for Stink; he credited the band for avoiding the genre's "dull despair" and instead keeping their music "rooted in the rock and roll everyday, where it belongs."

Lorraine Ali of the Los Angeles Times was less impressed, commending L7's return to a more "fuzzed-out" aesthetic but detecting "little genuine personality, be it a sense of irony or conviction, behind the lyrics, which are so predictably anti-Establishment that the only feeling you get from them is the band's need to be incredibly punk rock." NME reviewer Johnny Cigarettes deemed Hungry for Stink "roughly two-thirds of a fine album" and felt that it "sags noticeably in the middle and towards the end" from a lack of memorable melodies.

Retrospectively, AllMusic's Neil Z. Yeung found that Hungry for Stink, while "not as crisp and catchy" as L7's previous album Bricks Are Heavy, nonetheless stands out as one of their "crunchiest, grimiest, and nastiest" records and "merits attention and appreciation for being the end of a certain era for the band, just as they were on the verge of a brief evolution before their two-decade hiatus."

== Track listing ==
Hungry for Stink track listing
No.	Title	Writer(s)	Length
1.	"Andres"	Donita Sparks, Suzi Gardner	3:03
2.	"Baggage"	Sparks, Gardner	3:18
3.	"Can I Run"	Sparks	3:54
4.	"The Bomb"	Sparks, Jennifer Finch	2:39
5.	"Questioning My Sanity"	Sparks, Finch	3:42
6.	"Riding with a Movie Star"	Sparks	3:19
7.	"Stuck Here Again"	Sparks, Gardner	4:58
8.	"Fuel My Fire"	Sparks, Cosmic Psychos	3:46
9.	"Freak Magnet"	Sparks, Gardner	3:14
10.	"She Has Eyes"	Sparks, Finch	3:16
11.	"Shirley"	Finch	3:09
12.	"Talk Box"	Sparks	6:06
Total length:			44:43

== Personnel ==
Credits adapted from liner notes.

Performers

- Donita Sparks – guitar, lead vocals (on tracks 2, 3, 5, 6, 8, 10 and 12)
- Suzi Gardner – guitar, lead vocals (on tracks 1, 7 and 9)
- Jennifer Finch – bass guitar, lead vocals (on tracks 4 and 11)
- Demetra Plakas – drums

Production

- GGGarth – production

== Charts ==
Chart (1994)	Peak position
Australian Albums (ARIA)	57
Swedish Albums (Sverigetopplistan)	47
UK Albums (OCC)	26
US Billboard 200	117
US Heatseekers Albums (Billboard)	2
Scottish Albums (Official Charts)	59
European Albums (Music & Media)	60
