= The Shocker (band) =

American punk rock band

- Origin: Los Angeles, California, United States
- Genres: Punk rock
- Years active: 2002-2006
- Labels: Oglio Records, Go-Kart Records
- Members: Jennifer Finch; Adam Fuller; Lisa Howe; Ronnie James; Scott Quist
- Past members: Lura Jones; Arye Shine; Claudi Rossi; Steve Muscatell; Leah Casper; Keith Fertwagner
- Website: http://theshocker.band/

The Shocker was an American punk rock band, featuring L7 bassist Jennifer Finch as key songwriter performing vocals. The band also includes lead and rhythm guitarists, drums, and bass.

== History ==
Finch formed the band in Los Angeles in 2002 and stated that the first members were temporary, which led to a revolving line-up. The band takes its name from the hand gesture the shocker, a sexual innuendo.

In July 2003, The Shocker released their debut EP, Up Your Ass Tray, which contained seven songs. Finch was the primary songwriter, vocalist and guitarist for the group. Finch said that they wanted to show more of their "darker side"; some of the songs were considered more pop than rock. News-Times music reviewer Laurel Tuohy described The Shocker as "gritty, raw and infectious."

The group toured Europe in 2003 and performed on the Vans Warped Tour music festival in 2003 and 2005.

In 2006, the group released a full-length album entitled Up Your Ass Tray: The Full Length, with songs apropos of a hard rock band added.

== Discography ==
- Up Your Ass Tray EP (Oglio Records, 2003)
- Up Your Ass Tray – The Full Length (Go Kart, 2006)
