= The Beauty Process: Triple Platinum =

Studio album by L7
- Released: February 25, 1997
- Studios: Conway, Hollywood, California; Sound City, Van Nuys, California
- Genre: Punk rock
- Length: 41:35
- Labels: Slash; Reprise
- Producers: Rob Cavallo; Joe Barresi; L7

L7 chronology
Hungry for Stink (1994)	The Beauty Process: Triple Platinum (1997)	Live: Omaha to Osaka (1998)

Singles from The Beauty Process: Triple Platinum
- 1. "Off the Wagon" Released: January 28, 1997

The Beauty Process: Triple Platinum is the fifth studio album by American rock band L7, released on February 25, 1997, by Slash Records in collaboration with Reprise Records. It was recorded at Conway Recording Studios in Hollywood and Sound City Studios in Van Nuys, California. The band recorded most of the album as a trio formed by founding members Donita Sparks and Suzi Gardner, and longtime drummer Demetra Plakas, following the departure of bassist Jennifer Finch. The album marks a departure from the tough rock style of its predecessors to a slower and more adventurous style.

Upon release, The Beauty Process reached No. 172 on the US Billboard Top 200 chart and No. 12 on the Heatseekers Albums chart. To promote the album, L7 signed on as an opening act on a Marilyn Manson tour across the US. The song "Off the Wagon" was released as a single in 1997, while a concert film titled L7: The Beauty Process and directed by former Nirvana bassist Krist Novoselic was released in 1998. The album received generally favorable reviews from critics, who praised its attitude-filled lyrics and more liberating style compared to previous L7 albums. However, it sold worse than expected, leading Reprise to drop the band thereafter.

== Background and recording ==
The Beauty Process: Triple Platinum is the follow-up to L7's 1994 album Hungry for Stink, which was released by Slash Records in collaboration with Reprise Records. Hungry for Stink peaked at No. 117 on the US Billboard Top 200 chart and coincided with the 1994 Lollapalooza music festival, where the band shared the stage with other successful acts including The Smashing Pumpkins and The Breeders. For their next album, L7 decided to take a less constrained approach than they took with their previous albums. According to singer and guitarist Donita Sparks, "In the past, I think we wanted to prove that we were tough cookies. We wanted to show that we could rock harder than anyone. Now we're more secure. So we have more freedom. It's kind of liberating."

The Beauty Process was recorded at Conway Recording Studios in Hollywood and Sound City Studios in Van Nuys, California. The album was produced by Rob Cavallo, Joe Barresi, and the band. During the recording sessions, founding bassist Jennifer Finch left the band to return to college. Although Finch was briefly replaced by L7's friend Greta Brinkman, Sparks had to play bass when Brinkman was not available. Sparks explained that there was a huge cost associated with the time spent in the recording studio, henceforth the band could not afford to wait for Brinkman. The songs "Bitter Wine", "Must Have More", and "Me, Myself & I" were written by guitarist and vocalist Suzi Gardner. The album had to be mixed twice and mastered three times. Recording of the album was completed in November 1996.

== Music and lyrics ==
The Beauty Process marks a departure from the tough rock style of its predecessors to a slower and more adventurous style. For example, the song "Me, Myself & I" is an acoustic ballad, while "Moonshine" features a romantic and delicate chorus. Similarly, "Bitter Wine" deals with second chances and, according to CMJ New Music Monthly, features "distorted guitars against a eerie soundwash of picked bass, electronic drone and a lost-soul chorus." The single "Off the Wagon" was described by Sparks as the way she feels when she drinks heavily: "It might be the time of my life, or I might end up in tears. But there are always bruises involved." Although the track promotes substance abuse, Jennie Yabroff of Salon considered it to be "heavy on attitude [and] light on substance."

The Beauty Process also contains heavier songs that are reminiscent of the band's previous albums. The song "Drama" features a guitar solo played with a Micro Jammers' toy guitar. Sparks explained that she was getting frustrated with it, commenting "Fuck it, I can't play these riffs, let the Micro Jammers do it for $1.99." The song was described by Spin as "[coming] off like Helmet sans pretentious time signatures". The track "Bad Things" was described as "a full-throttle blast of urban paranoia", while "The Masses Are Asses" deals with social outrage and rude humor. The album's title refers to two different things: the first part, "The Beauty Process", is what Sparks would call "putting my fright makeup on before a show", while the second part, "Triple Platinum", is a joke about L7's career as the band had yet to reach gold status.

== Promotion and release ==
The Beauty Process was released on February 25, 1997, by Slash Records. To promote the album, L7 signed on as an opening act on a Marilyn Manson tour across the US in early 1997. Bassist Gail Greenwood, formerly of the alternative rock band Belly, joined the band as part of the touring group. Reprise director of artist development Linnea Nan explained that the tour was an opportunity to "bolster some awareness" and introduce the band to new fans. The tour ended in late February and lasted for 8 weeks. The album reached No. 172 on the US Billboard Top 200 chart and No. 12 on the Heatseekers Albums chart.

The song "Off the Wagon" was released as a single on January 28, 1997. The single included the outtakes "Guera" and "Punk Broke (My Heart)" as its B-side. A music video for the single was planned, but ultimately canceled. A concert film, titled L7: The Beauty Process, was directed by former Nirvana bassist Krist Novoselic and released in 1998. The film was shot in 1997 while Novoselic was on tour with the band. It features live footage of songs interspersed with sketches and acted out by the band members on days off from touring. The Beauty Process sold worse than expected, leading Reprise to drop the band thereafter.

== Critical reception ==
Professional ratings
Review scores
Source	Rating
AllMusic	3/5 stars
Chicago Tribune	2.5/4 stars
Entertainment Weekly	B
Los Angeles Times	3.5/4 stars
NME	6/10
Pitchfork	6.5/10
Rolling Stone	4/5 stars
The Rolling Stone Album Guide	3.5/5 stars
Spin	6/10
The Village Voice	A−

The Beauty Process received generally favorable reviews from music critics. Rolling Stone editor Alec Foege felt that the album is both more powerful and crisper than its predecessors, stating that the band had "matured into punk's distaff Jagger and Richards." Although he considered the song "Lorenza, Giada, Alessandra" to be a rip-off of Sonic Youth's "Swimsuit Issue" (sic, "Drunken Butterfly"), he concluded that the band offers "more fresh stylistic variations on classic punk into 40 minutes than most bands come up with during a career. Clever, cocky and ultimately ageless, The Beauty Process gives punk the face lift it deserves without smoothing the wrinkles." Similarly, Heidi Macdonald of CMJ New Music Monthly praised the album's different moods and attitude-filled lyrics, commenting that The Beauty Process includes "just enough self-examination to show that the girls have grown up, bet they haven't gotten stale."

In a mixed review, Jessica Hopper of Spin highlighted the album's slower songs, but concluded that L7 had essentially remained the same "pop-metal" band that they were in the past. The Chicago Tribune's Greg Kot observed that, although the album explores a more textured and nuanced sound, its lack of energy in the second half makes "such screeds as 'The Masses are Asses' come off as mean-spirited." Writing for Salon, Jennie Yabroff felt that, while the album features compelling and thrilling songs, none "has the depth or complexity to satisfy the listener beyond the initial junk-food high." In a negative review, Carly Carioli of The Boston Phoenix criticized the album for its vague lyrics—he remarked that the opener repeats the album title over "a single Melvins-y chord", while the closer repeats the names Lorenza, Giada, and Allesandra "over and over, faster and faster, over a near-identical clamor."

AllMusic editor Stephen Thomas Erlewine described The Beauty Process as "a good hard rock record" with "its fair share of hooks", but noted that it makes fans "yearn for the days when L7 appeared revolutionary, not just keepers of the flame." The A.V. Club's Stephen Thompson praised the songs for being anthemic and not overly polished and considered "The Masses Are Asses" and "Off The Wagon" as the album's finest moments. Prominent music critic Robert Christgau also gave a positive review to the album, commenting: "Brazenly revving even further toward metal, they work their claim to 'the urban din' till it yields the slag and shiny things they won't do without." Sparks regards The Beauty Process as her favourite L7 album as she felt that Gardner wrote songs that "completely stand up to any underground punk song ever." Entertainment Weekly initially had a positive review of the album, but later included it on their "flop albums" of 1997 list, as a result of its lack of commercial success.

== Track listing ==
All tracks are written by Donita Sparks and Suzi Gardner.

No.	Title	Length
1.	"The Beauty Process"	0:58
2.	"Drama"	3:28
3.	"Off the Wagon"	3:27
4.	"I Need"	2:57
5.	"Moonshine"	3:23
6.	"Bitter Wine"	4:15
7.	"The Masses Are Asses"	4:20
8.	"Bad Things"	3:12
9.	"Must Have More"	2:54
10.	"Non-Existent Patricia"	4:30
11.	"Me, Myself & I"	3:46
12.	"Lorenza, Giada, Alessandra"	4:25
Total length:		41:35

== Personnel ==
Credits are adapted from the album's liner notes.

L7

- Donita Sparks – guitar, vocals, bass, percussion, piano, production
- Suzi Gardner – guitar, vocals, production
- Demetra Plakas – drums, percussion, production

Additional musicians

- Greta Brinkman – bass
- Chris Bratton – additional drums
- Rob Cavallo – acoustic guitar on track 10
- Lionel Richie – count-off on track 5

Technical

- Rob Cavallo – production
- Joe Barresi – production, engineer
- Steve Holroyd – engineer
- Jack Joseph Puig – mixer
- Barry Goldberg – second engineer
- Billy Bowers – second engineer
- Greg Fidelman – second engineer
- Cheryl Jenets – A&R coordinator
- Bob Ludwig – mastering engineer

== Charts ==
Chart (1997)	Peak position
US Billboard 200	172
US Heatseekers Albums (Billboard)	12
