= Scatter the Rats =

Studio album by L7
- Released: May 3, 2019
- Studios: Happy Ending and Sunset Sound in Los Angeles, California, United States
- Genre: Grunge
- Length: 36:11
- Label: Blackheart
- Producers: Norm Block; Nick Launay

L7 chronology
The Slash Years (2000)	Scatter the Rats (2019)

Scatter the Rats is the seventh studio album by American rock band L7, released on May 3, 2019, through Blackheart Records. It is the band's first album in almost 20 years, following the band's 2014 reunion. It has received positive reviews.

== Recording and release ==
Scatter the Rats is the first L7 studio album in 20 years and was recorded with Norm Block and Nick Launay at Happy Ending Studios and Sunset Sound in Los Angeles, California, United States. It was preceded by the singles "Burn Baby" on February 28 and "Stadium West" on April 22. The band announced a 21-date tour to support the release, covering the United States in mid-2019. The release follows the band reforming in 2014 and releasing the non-album singles "Dispatch from Mar-a-Largo" in 2017 and "I Came Back to Bitch" in 2018.

== Reception ==
Professional ratings
Aggregate scores
Source	Rating
Metacritic	63/100
Review scores
Source	Rating
AllMusic	3.5/5 stars
Exclaim!	7/10
Pitchfork	6.6/10
Rolling Stone	3.5/5 stars
Under the Radar	5/10

According to the review aggregator Metacritic, Scatter the Rats received "generally favorable reviews" based on a weighted average score of 63 out of 100 from seven critic scores.

Pitchfork writer Dayna Evans's review criticized the lyrics on one track, "Murky Water Cafe", as ("lines that resort to cliché or grab at low-hanging cultural fruit feel not only dated, but cringeworthy") and musicianship ("They sell themselves short by assuming they were just another meat-and-potatoes rock band, and on Scatter the Rats’ weakest moments, they actually sound like one."). Neil Z. Yeung of AllMusic wrote that they are "cramming crunchy guitars and lurching rhythms into an updated stew of nasty punkabilly bounce, heavy metal muscle, and no-frills rock & roll" while stating that L7 "still snarl and pack a vicious punch".

Rolling Stone praised the album citing the strength of the band's "pile-driving guitar riffs and quirky ear candy." LA Weekly singled out the song "Stadium West" as "classic L7: punk fuzz and drone, with spit and fire in all the right places". Exclaim!'s review from Zahraa Hmood criticized it for being inconsistent, with immature songwriting in the middle tracks. James Thornhill of Under the Radar praised the guitar work and punk attitude of select tracks but noting that this is a weak outing for an iconic punk band and that the songwriting here does not live up to their 2017 and 2018 reunion singles.

== Track listing ==
No.	Title	Writer(s)	Length
1.	"Burn Baby"	Sparks	2:31
2.	"Fighting the Crave"	Sparks, Gardner	3:22
3.	"Proto Prototype"	Sparks, Gardner	3:12
4.	"Stadium West"	Sparks	3:43
5.	"Murky Water Cafe"	Gardner	4:00
6.	"Ouija Board Lies"	Sparks	2:59
7.	"Garbage Truck"	Finch	2:27
8.	"Holding Pattern"	Sparks	3:06
9.	"Uppin' the Ice"	Sparks	3:33
10.	"Cool About Easy"	Gardner	3:22
11.	"Scatter the Rats"	Sparks, Gardner, Finch, Plakas	4:27
Total length:			36:11

== Personnel ==
L7

- Jennifer Finch – bass guitar, vocals
- Suzi Gardner – guitar, vocals
- Demetra Plakas – drums, vocals
- Donita Sparks – vocals, guitar

Other personnel

- Norm Block – production
- Nick Launay – production
