= L7: Pretend We're Dead =

2016 documentary

- Directed by: Sarah Price
- Produced by: Maria Aceves; Bob Fagan
- Cinematography: Eric Scott
- Edited by: JoLynn Garnes
- Music by: Bryan Lee Brown
- Production company: Blue Hats Creative
- Release date: November 11, 2016 (DOC NYC)
- Running time: 87 minutes
- Country: United States
- Language: English

L7: Pretend We're Dead is a 2016 American independent documentary film made by Sarah Price focusing on the grunge band L7. The film covers the bands history through the 1990s and features interviews with Krist Novoselic, Shirley Manson, Joan Jett, Louise Post and Exene Cervenka.

The film was nominated for the Jury Prize at the 2017 Hollywood Film Festival and for the Indiemusic Schweppes Award at the IndieLisboa International Independent Film Festival in 2018. It won the Jury Prize at the Bordeaux Rock - Musical Ecran in 2018 and was nominated for a VO5 NME Award for Best Music Film.
