= Smell the Magic =

Studio album by L7
- Released: 1990
- Studios: Reciprocal (Seattle, Washington); Radio Tokyo (Venice, California); Paramount (Hollywood, California)
- Genres: Grunge; alternative metal
- Length: 29:36
- Label: Sub Pop
- Producer: Jack Endino

L7 chronology
L7 (1988)	Smell the Magic (1990)	Bricks Are Heavy (1992)

Singles from Smell the Magic
- 1. "Shove" Released: 1990

Smell the Magic is the second studio album by American rock band L7, released in 1990 by Sub Pop. Originally issued as a 12" EP containing only the first six songs, it was reissued on CD in July 1991, expanded to album length with three more tracks: "Packin' a Rod," "Just Like Me," and "American Society." The opening track "Shove" was released as the band's first single.

== Critical reception ==
Professional ratings
Review scores
Source	Rating
AllMusic	4/5 stars
Christgau's Consumer Guide	A
The Collector's Guide to Heavy Metal	7/10
The Encyclopedia of Popular Music	3/5 stars
Kerrang!	4/5 stars
Metal Hammer	5/5
MusicHound Rock	3/5 stars
NME	8/10
The Rolling Stone Album Guide	4/5 stars
Spin Alternative Record Guide	8/10

The Encyclopedia of Popular Music called the album "a raucous, grunge-flavored blast." Trouser Press wrote that "L7 still brings the noise, but with a melodicism that isn’t as evident on the first album."

Rolling Stone placed Smell the Magic at No. 37 on their list of the 50 Greatest Grunge Albums, noting that "they were one of the few non-Seattle bands signed to Sub Pop," and the album "was an electric shock in a sea of grey." Likewise, the article mentions L7's formation out of Los Angeles' metal scene, then acting as a crossover act, and states conclusively that Smell the Magic is one of the "most widely cited as an inspiration by the next wave of punk and riot grrrl bands".

== Track listing ==
No.	Title	Writer(s)	Length
1.	"Shove"	Suzi Gardner, Donita Sparks	3:10
2.	"Fast and Frightening"	Gardner, Sparks	2:37
3.	"(Right On) Thru"	Jennifer Finch	3:13
4.	"Deathwish"	Sparks, Finch, Demetra Plakas	3:45
5.	"Till the Wheels Fall Off"	Gardner, Sparks	3:43
6.	"Broomstick"	Gardner, Sparks, Finch	3:49
7.	"Packin' a Rod"	Scott Morrow	2:08
8.	"Just Like Me"	Gardner, Sparks, Finch, Plakas, Dusty	3:32
9.	"American Society (Eddie and the Subtitles cover)"	Eddie Joseph, Mike Patton	3:53
Total length:			29:36

== Personnel ==
L7

- Donita Sparks – guitar, vocals, lead vocals on tracks 2,4,5,7,9
- Suzi Gardner – guitar, lead vocals on tracks 1,5,6,9
- Jennifer Finch – bass guitar, lead vocals on tracks 3,8,9
- Demetra Plakas – drums

Guest

- Mike Patton – guest vocals

Production

- Jack Endino – producer
- Michael James – engineer
- Daniel Rey – engineer
- Randall Martin – logo
- Charles Peterson – photography
- Howard Rosenberg – photography
- Jeff Price – art director
