= Rock for Choice =

North American benefit concert series

Rock for Choice (or Rock 4 Choice) was a series of concerts held over a ten-year period between 1991 and 2001.

== Background ==
The first Rock for Choice concert was organized by L7 and music editor Sue Cummings of the LA Weekly, who brought their idea for a pro-abortion rights benefit concert modeled on Bob Geldof's Live Aid.

Rock for Choice's first concert was held at the Palace on Vine Street in Hollywood, California, on October 25, 1991, and featured Nirvana, Hole, L7, and Sister Double Happiness. Concert attendees were encouraged to speak out about women's issues from a politically progressive angle, especially abortion rights and voter registration. Rock for Choice L7/Joan Jett concert footage and politics are featured on the rock documentary Not Bad for a Girl. An after-party that followed the initial concert led Nirvana drummer Dave Grohl and members of L7 to encourage artist Jim Evans to do a poster for a future Rock For Choice show, leading to the creation of the poster group TAZ. The TAZ collective, creating work in the style of underground comix, went on to do posters for some of the biggest Rock For Choice shows.

L7 performed at the September 27, 1992 Rock for Choice benefit concert at the Hollywood Palladium along with Exene Cervenka, the Red Hot Chili Peppers, and Mudhoney.

In October 1993, seven bands played a sold out Rock for Choice benefit, including bands X, Firehose, and Rage Against the Machine. Later Rock for Choice concerts included the Foo Fighters, Ween, Pearl Jam, Rage Against the Machine, and other prominent bands of the era.

The genesis for Rock for Choice came from an interview that Sue Cummings did with L7 for the LA Weekly, in which the band said they were planning to advertise one of their upcoming local shows as "Rock Against Coat Hangers" and donate the proceeds to a pro-abortion rights group. Sue encouraged the band to consider expanding their gig to a larger scale, contending that since there had been many benefit concerts performed in the past in the United States to help resolve famine abroad, it would be appropriate to have similar concerts raising funds for abortion access (which she saw as a more pressing and relevant issue to Americans). Cummings asked the band if they would be willing to invite other artists to play the show, contacted several feminist organizations to find a sponsor, and arranged a meeting with the Feminist Majority Foundation when they agreed to participate.

The Rock for Choice concert series originated at about the same time as the Riot Grrl movement, made up of a new generation of feminists and rock bands originating in Olympia, Washington. Both Rock for Choice and Riot Grrrl were reacting to the early 1990s bombing of abortion clinics by certain fringe elements of the anti-abortion movement and were often associated in the public's mind as a single movement, although few Riot Grrrl bands, with the exception of Bikini Kill, ever played Rock for Choice shows. But Rock for Choice formed an important cultural bridge between the baby boomer feminists of the 1970s, who had organized the Feminist Majority, and the generation X feminists of the 1990s music scene.

The concert series evolved into an organization managed by the Feminist Majority Foundation, which released a number of compilation albums featuring artists that supported Rock for Choice. The album Spirit of '73: Rock for Choice included fourteen female artists of the 90s singing hits from the 70s and was named based on the Roe v. Wade Supreme Court decision in 1973.

The final Rock for Choice concert was held in 2001 and was attended by actress Gillian Anderson.

== Featured artists ==
Artists featured in the Rock for Choice concerts included:

- 7 Year Bitch
- Bad Religion
- The Bangles
- Bikini Kill
- Paula Cole
- Concrete Blonde
- Melissa Etheridge
- Face To Face
- Firehose
- Fishbone
- Free Kitten
- Foo Fighters
- Fugazi
- Kim Gordon
- Hole
- Jawbreaker
- Joan Jett
- Korn
- L7
- Lunachicks
- Sarah McLachlan
- Manhole
- Meat Puppets
- Mudhoney
- Nirvana
- No Doubt
- The Offspring
- Joan Osborne
- Joey Ramone
- Dee Dee Ramone
- Pansy Division
- Pearl Jam
- Liz Phair
- Iggy Pop
- Possum Dixon
- Poster Children
- Primus
- Radiohead
- Rage Against the Machine
- Rancid
- Red Hot Chili Peppers
- Salt-N-Pepa
- Screaming Trees
- Sister Double Happiness
- Soundgarden
- Stone Temple Pilots
- Trip Shakespeare
- Ween
- White Zombie
- X
