= Bricks Are Heavy =

Studio album by L7
- Released: April 14, 1992
- Recorded: November 1991
- Studios: Smart (Madison, Wisconsin); Sound City (Van Nuys, California)
- Genres: Grunge; alternative metal
- Length: 37:28
- Label: Slash
- Producers: L7; Butch Vig

L7 chronology
Smell the Magic (1990)	Bricks Are Heavy (1992)	Hungry for Stink (1994)

Singles from Bricks Are Heavy
- 1. "Pretend We're Dead" Released: 1992; 2. "Everglade" Released: 1992; 3. "Monster" Released: 1992

Bricks Are Heavy is the third studio album by American rock band L7, released on April 14, 1992, by Slash Records. The album peaked at number 160 on the US Billboard 200 and number one on the Heatseekers Albums chart. As of June 2000, Bricks Are Heavy has sold 327,000 copies in the United States, according to Nielsen Soundscan.

== Background ==
Following the release of their earlier material on Sub Pop, L7 sought wider distribution and signed with Slash Records, which had recently secured a distribution deal with Warner Bros. Records. Frontwoman Donita Sparks later described the move as a natural next step for the band rather than a decision driven by financial incentives.

Sparks expressed support for the band's transition from the underground scene to a major label, viewing it as an opportunity to reach a wider audience and connect with listeners who felt alienated or isolated.

== Production ==
Produced by the band and Butch Vig, the album marked a shift toward a more refined and deliberate recording approach compared to L7's earlier work. The band chose to work with Vig after hearing his production on Nirvana's Nevermind and visiting sessions at Sound City Studios, where parts of the album were recorded.

Recording took place at Sound City Studios in Van Nuys, California, where drum tracks were completed, and at Smart Studios in Madison, Wisconsin for overdubs. Sparks noted that Vig favored the drum sound at Sound City and opted to track drums there before completing the album in Madison. She also described Vig as meticulous in his production approach, particularly his emphasis on precise tuning and layered arrangements, contributing to a more polished sound. Guitar tracks were occasionally layered using different amplifiers, allowing comparisons between tones and enabling selective doubling when it enhanced the overall sound.

Musically, the album is heavier and dirtier than the band's previous recordings and was described as "catchy tunes and mean vocals on top of ugly guitars and a quick-but-thick bottom of cast-iron grunge" by Entertainment Weekly's Gina Arnold.

== Critical reception ==
Professional ratings
Review scores
Source	Rating
AllMusic	4.5/5 stars
Chicago Tribune	2.5/4 stars
Christgau's Consumer Guide	A
Entertainment Weekly	A
Kerrang!	5/5
Los Angeles Times	3/4 stars
NME	8/10
Rolling Stone	3/5 stars
The Rolling Stone Album Guide	4/5 stars
Spin Alternative Record Guide	9/10

In a contemporary review for Playboy, Robert Christgau regarded Bricks Are Heavy as an "object lesson in how to advance your music by meeting the marketplace halfway", although he believed it would not sell as much as it deserved. He said Vig helped L7 produce grunge-metal featuring "intense admixtures of ditty and power chord" that "never quite gathers Nirvana's momentum, but it's just as catchy and a touch nastier." NME critic Angela Lewis called Bricks Are Heavy a "polished, virile white heat rock" record that "verifies their hard rock credentials completely" and demonstrates that L7 ought not to be pigeonholed as a grunge act. Kerrang!'s Steffan Chirazi was most impressed by the album's "relentlessness" in "driving the frustrations of everyday life home", and Gina Arnold said in Entertainment Weekly that L7 distinguish themselves from the musically similar Nirvana through the "clarity" of their lyrics. "Although the band's positive-plus stances on liberal issues may not instantly endear it to fuzzy-minded teen America," Arnold wrote, "L7 does manage to be simultaneously fun and furious, an intensely appealing combination."

Los Angeles Times writer Jonathan Gold, while finding Bricks Are Heavy "a very good, sometimes brilliant hard-rock album", expressed reservations about Vig's polished production, saying that although it suited "a pop band at heart" like Nirvana, "L7 is a rock band, less like the Byrds than like the MC5, less about pop craft than about sheer aggression." Arion Berger of Rolling Stone felt that the production's "neatly modulated dynamics" rendered the album "merely raucous where it might have been apocalyptic." In the Chicago Tribune, Greg Kot opined that there were not many good songs such as "Slide" and "the performances—while certainly ferocious—aren't sufficiently varied enough to make up the difference."

NME listed Bricks Are Heavy as the 39th-best album of 1992. It placed at number 32 in The Village Voice's Pazz & Jop critics' poll, with the poll's creator Robert Christgau ranking the album fourth on his ballot.

=== Legacy ===
Reviewing Bricks Are Heavy for AllMusic, Eduardo Rivadavia said that Vig helped L7 "obtain a tight, compact sound" and sharpen their songwriting on what would be their "crowning achievement" and "an impossible act to follow".

Bricks Are Heavy is now regarded as one of grunge music's best albums. Treble's Brian Roesler credited L7 with helping to define "the very best of early grunge" through the album's fusion of pop and metal musical elements.

In 2015, Spin placed Bricks Are Heavy at number 249 on its list of the "300 Best Albums of the Past 30 Years".

=== Accolades ===
Critical rankings for Bricks Are Heavy
Publication	Country	Type	List	Year	Rank	Ref.
Treble	United States	All-time	The 30 Best Grunge Albums	2016	15	
Rolling Stone	United States	All-time	50 Greatest Grunge Albums	2019	15	
Loudwire	United States	All-time	The 30 Best Grunge Albums of All Time	2023	16	

== Track listing ==
No.	Title	Writer(s)	Length
1.	"Wargasm"	Donita Sparks	2:40
2.	"Scrap"	Sparks, Brett Gurewitz	2:53
3.	"Pretend We're Dead"	Sparks	3:53
4.	"Diet Pill"	Sparks	4:21
5.	"Everglade"	Jennifer Finch, Daniel Rey	3:18
6.	"Slide"	Suzi Gardner, Sparks	3:37
7.	"One More Thing"	Finch	4:07
8.	"Mr. Integrity"	Sparks	4:06
9.	"Monster"	Gardner	2:56
10.	"Shitlist"	Sparks	2:55
11.	"This Ain't Pleasure"	Gardner, Phil Caivano	2:42
Total length:			37:28

== Personnel ==
Credits adapted from liner notes.

L7

- Donita Sparks – guitar, lead vocals (tracks 1–4, 8 and 10)
- Suzi Gardner – guitar, lead vocals (tracks 6, 9 and 11)
- Jennifer Finch – bass, lead vocals (tracks 5 and 7)
- Demetra Plakas – drums, backing vocals (track 3)

Additional musician

- Paul Ryan – bongos

Production

- Butch Vig – production, engineering, mixing
- Howie Weinberg – mastering
- Steve Marker – engineering
- Mr. Colson – engineering
- Elizabeth Hale – art direction
- Jeff Price – art direction
- Randall Martin – artwork
- Vicki Berndt – photography
- Arlan E. Helm – photography
- Damion Romero – photography

== Charts ==
=== Album ===
Chart (1992)	Peak position
Australian Albums (ARIA)	47
UK Albums (OCC)	24
US Billboard 200	160
US Heatseekers Albums (Billboard)	1

=== Singles ===
Year	Title	Peak Chart positions		
Year	Title	US^{Mod}	AUS	UK
1992	"Pretend We're Dead"	8	50	21
1992	"Everglade"	—	85	27
1992	"Monster"	—	—	33
"—" denotes singles that were released but did not chart.
