= Love Is a Mix Tape =

Memoir by Rob Sheffield

Love Is a Mix Tape: Life and Loss, One Song at a Time
- Author: Rob Sheffield
- Cover artist: Gregg Kulick
- Language: English
- Subject: Music
- Genre: Autobiography
- Publisher: Crown Publishing Group
- Publication date: January 2, 2007
- Publication place: United States
- Media type: Print (Hardback)
- Pages: 224
- ISBN: 1-4000-8302-8
- OCLC: 68712136
- Dewey Decimal: 781.64092 B 22
- LC Class: ML423.S537 A3 2007

Love Is a Mix Tape: Life and Loss, One Song at a Time is an autobiographical memoir by Rob Sheffield. It follows his first meeting of Renée Crist, their love for each other, and the eventual loss when Renée suddenly passes away from a pulmonary embolism in 1997 after only five years of being married. Music is explored throughout the book; how music brought him and his wife together, their shared love of music and how music helped him cope with losing her. Each chapter is prefaced with a mixtape or list of tracks that correspond to the plot.

An audiobook version of the book read by Sheffield was released.

== Reception ==
The book was reviewed by Publishers Weekly, Kirkus Reviews, The A.V. Club, Creative Loafing, Newsweek, The Austin Chronicle, The Denver Post, and Los Angeles Times.
