= Suzi Gardner =

American musician and creative director (born 1960)

Suzanne Gardner
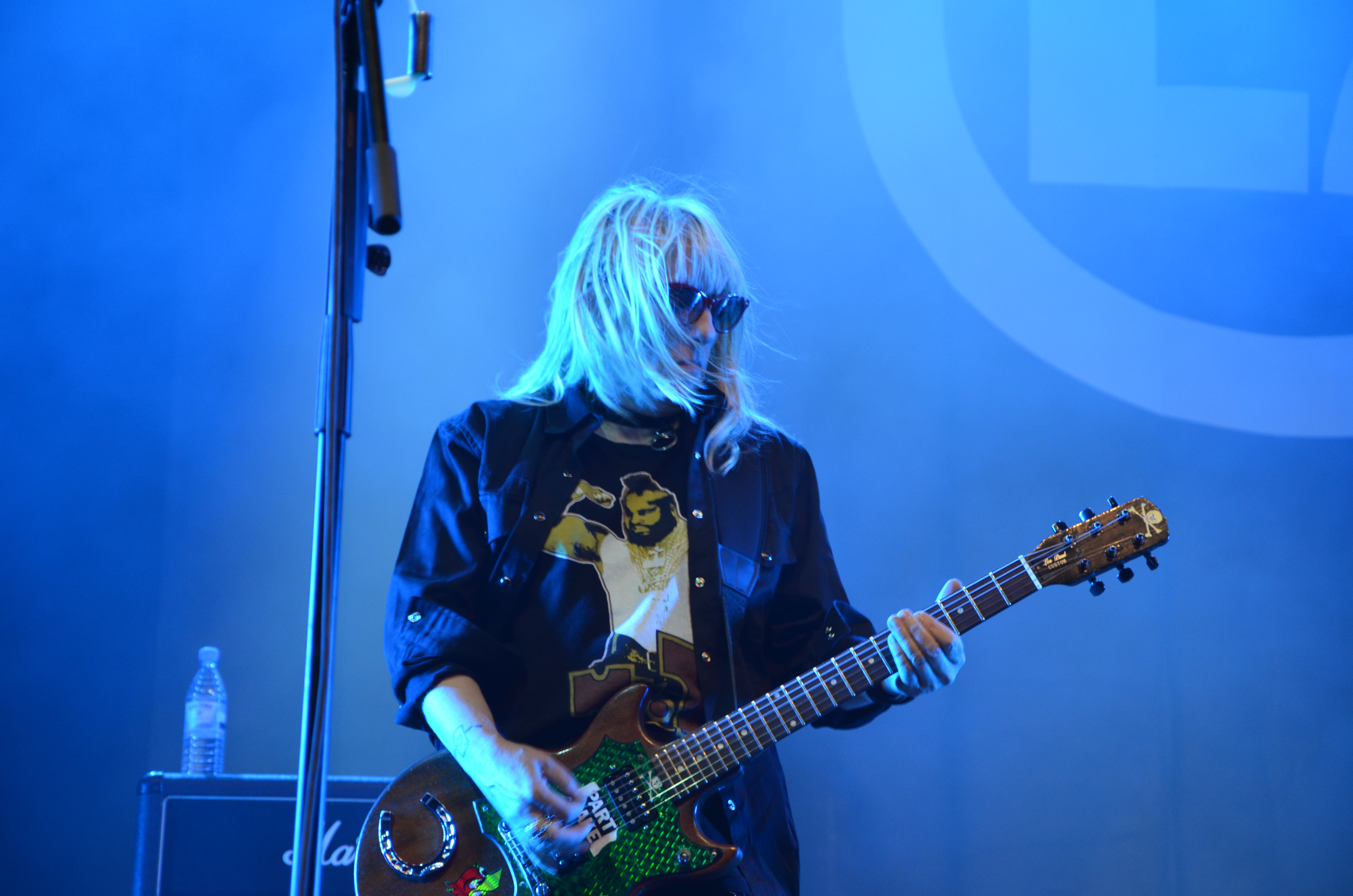
- Gardner performing in Germany, 2015

Background information
- Born: August 1, 1960 (age 65); Altus, Oklahoma, U.S.
- Genres: Punk rock; grunge; alternative rock; alternative metal; heavy metal
- Occupations: Guitarist; singer-songwriter
- Instruments: Guitar; percussion; vocals
- Years active: 1982–present
- Labels: Epitaph; Sub Pop; Slash; Wax Tadpole Records; Blackheart

Suzanne Gardner (born August 1, 1960) is an American musician and creative director best known for being a guitarist, vocalist, and co-founder of the rock band L7.

== Early life ==
Gardner was born in Altus, Oklahoma on August 1, 1960 to Anne B. Gardner. She had an older brother, Bob, and grew up partly in Citrus Heights, California. Gardner moved to Southern California in 1977. She attended Orange Coast College in 1978 and studied physical anthropology and guitar. In 1980, Gardner moved to Los Angeles.

== Career ==
Before playing with L7, Gardner held a number of jobs in Los Angeles and had worked at LA Weekly. She was writing poetry and music at the time she met Donita Sparks in 1984. They had each worked at LA Weekly, although at separate times, and met through mutual contacts still connected to the publisher. Gardner co-founded the punk rock group L7 with Sparks by 1985. When they began to write music together as L7, Gardner and Sparks were active in the creative Art punk DIY scene of musicians, poets, and performance artists in the Echo Park/Silverlake area.

Gardner is a primary songwriter for L7 and is credited with the tracks "Bite the Wax Tadpole", "It's Not You", "Snake Handler", "Cat-O'-Nine-Tails", "Monster", "Stuck Here Again" and "Freak Magnet". Along with appearing on all seven of L7's studio albums, Gardner also provided guest vocals on the Black Flag song "Slip It In" on their 1984 release of the same title. With her L7 bandmates Donita Sparks and Jennifer Finch, she was also featured on the Bad Religion album Suffer, released in 1988, where she provided additional guitar with Sparks on the song "Best for You".

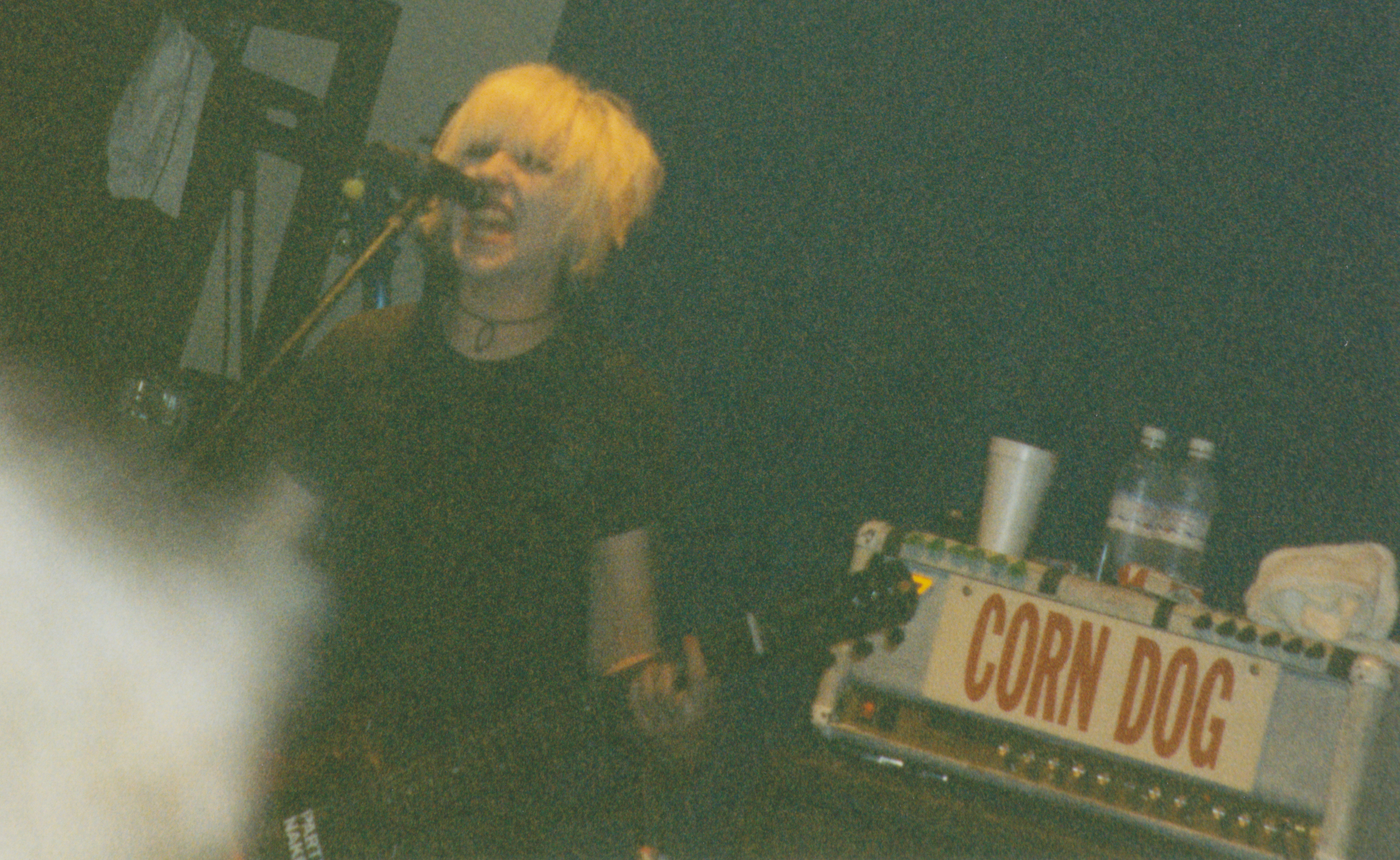
Gardner at the Emerson Theatre, 1997

Gardner and L7 formed a pro-choice organization called Rock for Choice, which staged many benefit shows featuring popular bands such as Rage Against the Machine and Nirvana. The first Rock for Choice concert was in 1991.

In a 1993 article for Spin which featured L7 on the magazine's cover, Renée Crist described L7 as "four of the funniest, meanest, strongest, coolest, most pissed-off women I know" and as "wild, rambunctious, spontaneous" with a stage show that "is a wash of buddy love, crowd working, and acrobatics".

In 1994, Gardner appeared in the John Waters film Serial Mom as part of the fictitious band "Camel Lips".

Gardner, in 2000, became the first woman to have her breasts plaster-cast by Cynthia Plaster Caster, the artist who had spent decades casting impressions of rock music's most famous phalluses.

Original video and consolidated interviews with Gardner are included in the documentary L7: Pretend We're Dead, released in 2016 and directed by Sarah Price. The film was nominated for a VO5 NME Award for Best Music Film.

Gardner continued to perform internationally with the original line up of L7 in 2015 – 2017 and co-wrote two new songs with Sparks: Dispatch from Mar-a-Lago, 2017 and I Came Back to Bitch, 2018.

On the latest L7 album Scatter the Rats (released in 2019 to generally favorable reviews), Gardner wrote several songs including "Fighting the Crave", "Proto Prototype", and "Cool About Easy". Gardner and the band announced a 6-week nationwide tour with a start date of May 10, 2019.

Spin reported that Gardner appeared at the Roxy Theatre on January 11, 2020, and "delivered a blistering rendition of 'Keys to Your Heart'" by Joe Strummer at a tribute to the Clash.

== Discography ==
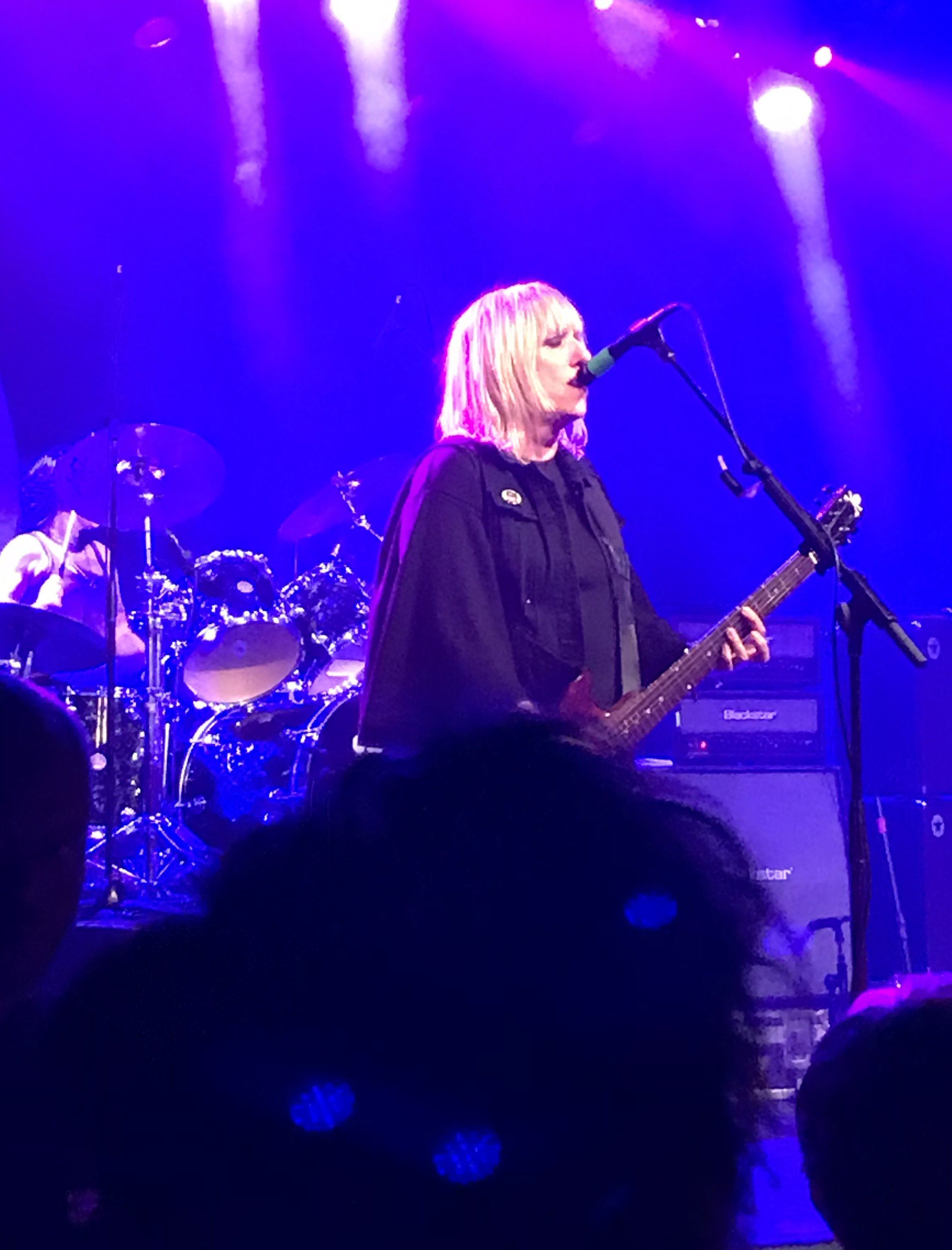
Gardner performing in Vancouver, BC in 2019

=== With L7 ===
- L7 (1988)
- Smell the Magic (1990)
- Bricks Are Heavy (1992)
- Hungry for Stink (1994)
- The Beauty Process: Triple Platinum (1997)
- Slap-Happy (1999)
- Scatter the Rats (2019)

=== As guest musician ===
- Black Flag – Slip It In (1984): backing vocals
- Bad Religion – Suffer (1988): additional guitar
- Circle Jerks – Oddities, Abnormalities and Curiosities (1995): backing vocals
