= L7 (album) =

Studio album by L7
- Released: September 1988
- Recorded: 1987
- Studio: Westbeach (Hollywood)
- Genres: Punk rock; grunge
- Length: 31:58
- Label: Epitaph
- Producer: Brett Gurewitz

L7 chronology
| L7 (1988) | Smell the Magic (1990) |

L7 is the debut studio album by American rock band L7, released in September 1988, by Epitaph Records.

== Production ==
The album was recorded in Brett Gurewitz's studio, in Hollywood, California. It is the band's only album with drummer Roy Koutsky.

The album's first track, "Bite the Wax Tadpole," refers to the legend that this is a Chinese transliteration of "Coca-Cola".

== Critical reception ==
Professional ratings
Review scores
| Source | Rating |
|---|---|
| AllMusic | 3.5/5 stars |
| The Encyclopedia of Popular Music | 3/5 stars |
| Kerrang! | 2.25/5 stars |
| MusicHound Rock | 2/5 stars |
| The Rolling Stone Album Guide | 2.5/5 stars |
| Spin Alternative Record Guide | 4/10 |
| Sputnikmusic | 4.5/5 |

Trouser Press wrote that the album "is a heady but largely inconsequential introduction; it’s all brute force and speed, grunge as a sheer sonic description." Reviewing the album for AllMusic, Steve Huey stated that the band's "trademark grungy fusion of punk and metal" wasn't fully formed yet.

== Track listing ==
| No. | Title | Writer(s) | Length |
|---|---|---|---|
| 1. | "Bite the Wax Tadpole" | Suzi Gardner | 2:16 |
| 2. | "Cat-o'-Nine-Tails" | Gardner | 2:12 |
| 3. | "Metal Stampede" | Donita Sparks | 2:25 |
| 4. | "Let's Rock Tonight" | Gardner, Sparks | 3:12 |
| 5. | "Uncle Bob" | Gardner, Sparks, Jennifer Finch, Roy Koutsky | 6:32 |
| 6. | "Snake Handler" | Gardner | 2:29 |
| 7. | "Runnin' from the Law" | Gardner, Sparks | 3:10 |
| 8. | "Cool Out" | Sparks | 2:54 |
| 9. | "It's Not You" | Gardner | 1:45 |
| 10. | "I Drink" | Gardner, Sparks, Finch, Koutsky | 2:55 |
| 11. | "Ms. 45" | Gardner, Sparks, Finch, Koutsky | 2:40 |
| Total length: | | | 31:58 |

== Personnel ==
L7

- Donita Sparks – vocals, guitar
- Suzi Gardner – guitar, vocals
- Jennifer Finch – bass guitar, vocals
- Roy Koutsky – drums

Production

- Brett Gurewitz – producer
- Jordan Tarlow – guitar technician
- Suzy Beal – artwork
- Donnell Cameron – engineer
- Jeff Campbell – CD layout
- Al Flipside – photography, cover photo
- Bruce Kalberg – photography
- Randall Martin – logo
- Eddy Schreyer – mastering
- N.Todd Skiles – design
