= Sarah Price (filmmaker) =

American film director

- Born: 1970 (age 55–56); Virginia, United States
- Education: University of Iowa
- Occupation: Film director/producer

Sarah Price (born 1970) is an American filmmaker, director and producer known for the feature documentary American Movie (1999 Winner of the Grand Jury Prize for Documentary at the Sundance Film Festival, released by Sony Pictures Classics).

Price is a member of the Directors Guild of America.

== Early life ==
Price spent the first five years of her life in London, England, her early school years in the American Midwest and East Coast, and later attended high school at the International Schools in Frankfurt, Germany and Nairobi, Kenya. Price was educated at the University of Iowa.

== Career ==
She directed Caesar's Park (2001 SXSW Int'l Film Fest, Sundance Channel), The Yes Men (2003 Toronto Int'l Film Festival, released by United Artist/MGM), and Summercamp! (2006 Toronto Int'l Film Fest, Sundance Channel). Price was also a cinematographer on The Yes Men Fix the World (2009 Sundance Film Fest/HBO), and a Co-Producer of Youssou N’dour: I Bring What I Love (2008 Toronto Int’l Fest). In 2009, she expanded into commercial directing and is represented by Independent Media Inc. Sarah further expanded into episodic television in 2014, directing The Carrie Diaries for Warner Brothers.

In 2016, Sarah Price's documentary film L7: Pretend We're Dead was first screened. Price describes hearing a song by L7 while working as a DJ at her college radio station as the seed of her curiosity and interest in the group. The film was nominated for the Jury Prize at the 2017 Hollywood Film Festival and for the Indiemusic Schweppes Award at the IndieLisboa International Independent Film Festival in 2018. "L7: Pretend We're Dead" won the Jury Prize at the Bordeaux Rock - Musical Ecran in 2018.
