= L7 (band) =

American punk rock band

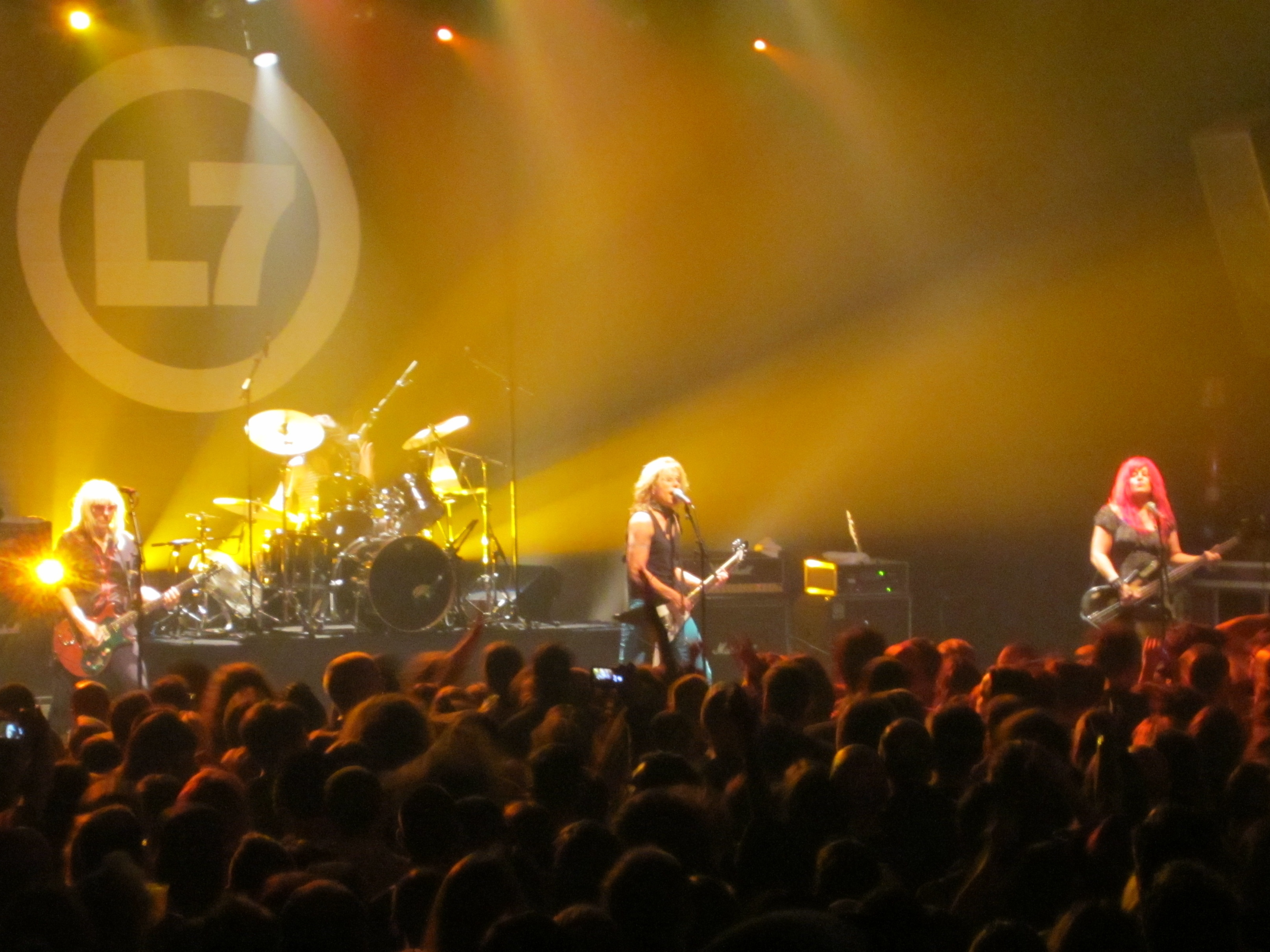
- L7 performing in 2015

Background information
- Origin: Los Angeles, California, U.S.
- Genres: Grunge; punk rock; alternative rock; riot grrrl; alternative metal
- Works: Discography
- Years active: 1985–2001; 2014–present
- Labels: Epitaph; Sub Pop; Slash; London; Reprise; Man's Ruin; Wax Tadpole; Don Giovanni; Blackheart
- Members: Donita Sparks; Suzi Gardner; Demetra Plakas; Janis Tanaka
- Past members: Jennifer Finch; Greta Brinkman; Gail Greenwood; Anne Anderson; Roy Koutsky
- Website: l7theband.com

L7 is an American punk rock band founded in Los Angeles, California, first active from 1985 to 2001 and re-formed in 2014. The group currently consists of Suzi Gardner (guitars, vocals), Donita Sparks (vocals, guitars), Dee Plakas (drums, backing vocals) and Janis Tanaka (bass guitar). L7 has released seven studio albums and has toured widely in the United States, Europe, Japan, Australia, and South America. "Pretend We're Dead" was heavily played on United States alternative radio and entered the top 10 on the Billboard Modern Rock chart in 1992.

Due to their sound and image, L7 is often associated with the grunge movement of the late 1980s and early 1990s, and as an all-female band, L7 has, at times, been linked to riot grrrl, although they preceded and are outliers of both the grunge and riot grrrl movements. L7 has been supportive of political causes, and formed Rock for Choice in 1991. A documentary film about the band, L7: Pretend We're Dead, premiered in 2016.

== History ==
=== Formation and early years (1985–1989) ===
L7 was formed by Donita Sparks and Suzi Gardner in 1985. Both artists were active in the art punk community of Echo Park and had met in 1984 through mutual contacts at the cultural hub of the LA Weekly. Of their meeting and on hearing Gardner play a tape of her songs in progress, Sparks described it as "one of the happiest days of my life" with a clear synchronicity in the music they were each interested in creating. At the time, Gardner was also active as a poet. A year prior, Gardner had performed backing vocals on the college radio hit "Slip It In" by Black Flag. Gardner and Sparks began performing regularly in Los Angeles at punk and metal venues along with a revolving list of supporting musicians in the early years.

The punk rock duo brought Jennifer Finch on board as bass guitarist and Roy Koutsky on drums. Finch, with the strongest Californian roots of the four, connected the band with an even wider network, including Brett Gurewitz of Epitaph Records where the band recorded their first demo. Their eponymous debut album, described as "intense, energetic" and "fast straightforward punk music" was released by Epitaph Records in 1987. L7 reported challenges in the early years with finding a suitable, stable drummer. Shortly after the release of L7, Koutsky quit the band and was replaced by Anne Anderson. Anderson's only studio appearance with L7 was on the SST Records compilation The Melting Pot in 1988 (via a cover of the Ohio Express track "Yummy Yummy Yummy"). Subsequently, Anderson left at the end of the touring cycle for the L7 record, and Demetra "Dee" Plakas was recruited by the band in late 1989 which completed the band's first stabilized lineup as an all-female band.

=== Time with Sub Pop (1989–1991) ===
The band released ("Shove"/"Packin' a Rod") in 1989 as the Sub Pop Single of the Month. L7 reportedly spent a short time in Seattle in the early 1990s. L7's next album, Smell the Magic, was released in 1990 on Sub Pop and earned a four star review by Rolling Stone who stated "With Donita Sparks' and Suzi Gardner's twin lockstep guitars racing down the highway to hell, Smell the Magic was one of Sub Pop's finest hours." L7 traveled to England and opened for Nirvana on several dates in 1990.

In August 1991, L7 performed at the International Pop Underground Convention (IPU) held in Olympia, Washington. The IPU was organized around a fiercely independent DIY ethic, with L7 the only band with major label representation, having recently signed with Slash Records (a subsidiary of London Records).

=== Major label releases with Slash (1991–1997) ===
Their 1992 third album, Bricks Are Heavy, produced by Butch Vig, was featured in Rolling Stone's May 1999 list of 'Essential recordings of the 1990s', and was their most critically and commercially successful release. When Donita Sparks reached out to Yoko Ono to request permission to sample her scream in the opening track "Wargasm," Ono reportedly replied that she had her fingers crossed for the group as it was time for their music to get popular. Their 1992 single "Pretend We're Dead" spent 13 weeks on the US Alternative Songs chart while peaking at the No. 8 position, and it had also peaked at No. 21 on the UK Singles Chart. The singles "Everglade" and "Monster" also made appearances on the UK Singles chart. In their listing of the top 50 grunge songs, Paste magazine included "Pretend We're Dead" as number 21. L7 went on a year long tour to promote Bricks Are Heavy. Variety reported in 1992 that L7 had built a huge underground following all over the world due to repeatedly touring. The popularity of Bricks Are Heavy was also boosted by frequent video play on MTV. By June 2000, Bricks Are Heavy had sold 327,000 copies in the US.

During their performance at the 1992 Reading Festival, the band experienced "technical difficulties with their audio equipment" and were forced to stall their set. The rowdy crowd grew restless and began throwing mud onto the stage, repeatedly pelting the band. In protest, lead vocalist Donita Sparks removed her tampon on-stage and threw it into the crowd yelling "Eat my used tampon, fuckers!" Sparks has remained unapologetic about the incident, and the tampon has been referred to as one of the "most unsanitary pieces of rock memorabilia in history." Later in 1992, Sparks caused controversy in the United Kingdom when she dropped her jeans and underwear on live television, appearing nude from the waist down, during an L7 performance on the late night UK programme The Word. Of the incident, Sparks later commented that the Word show L7 appeared on had a number of chaotic aspects already underway including "a men's bum contest" and a "hidden camera in Oliver Reed's dressing room, showing him intoxicated with his shirt off, which was really fucked up. So I added my contribution to this craziness."

In a July 1993 article for Spin which featured L7 on the magazine's cover, Renée Crist described L7 as "four of the funniest, meanest, strongest, coolest, most pissed-off women I know" and as "wild, rambunctious, spontaneous" with a stage show that "is a wash of buddy love, crowd working, and acrobatics".

L7's fourth album, Hungry for Stink, was released in July 1994. The album peaked at No. 117 on the Billboard 200 chart, their highest position to date. "Andres" was the lead single off the album, which peaked at No. 20 on the US Alternative Songs and No. 34 on the UK Singles charts. The band continued to be regarded as a strong live act and performed on the main stage of the Lollapalooza tour in 1994, which also included The Smashing Pumpkins, the Beastie Boys, George Clinton, Nick Cave, A Tribe Called Quest, and The Breeders. In January 1995, L7 played a set of benefit concerts for Voters for Choice at Constitution Hall along with Neil Young, Lisa Germano, and Pearl Jam. Finch created a "slight fuss" after reportedly playing the final song of one show after removing her shirt.

In 1995, L7 was one of four bands featured in the documentary film Not Bad For a Girl. The film, which focused on several all-female bands, was awarded Best Documentary at the New York Underground Film Festival in 1996.

Finch left the band in 1996, during the recording of their fifth album,The Beauty Process: Triple Platinum. Sparks and Greta Brinkman played bass on the album, after which Gail Greenwood – formerly of the band Belly – became the band's full-time bassist. L7 performed at the Bumbershoot festival in Seattle, Washington in 1997.

=== Independent output and initial disbandment (1997–2001) ===
In 1998, the pseudo-documentary film L7: The Beauty Process was released, directed by Krist Novoselic. The film contains actual concert footage of L7's trials and travails of being a "punk-like band in a pop-like marketplace."

L7's sixth studio album, Slap-Happy, was released on the band's own label Wax Tadpole Records in 1999. To promote the record, on July 17, 1999, L7 had a plane fly over the crowd at the Lilith Fair at the Rose Bowl in Pasadena, California, with a banner that read, "Bored? Tired? Try L7." The following day, an airplane towed a banner over the crowd at the Warped Tour at the Stone Pony lot in Asbury Park, New Jersey. The banner read "Warped needs more beaver...love, L7." Greenwood later left the band and was replaced by Janis Tanaka, formerly of the San Francisco band, Stone Fox.

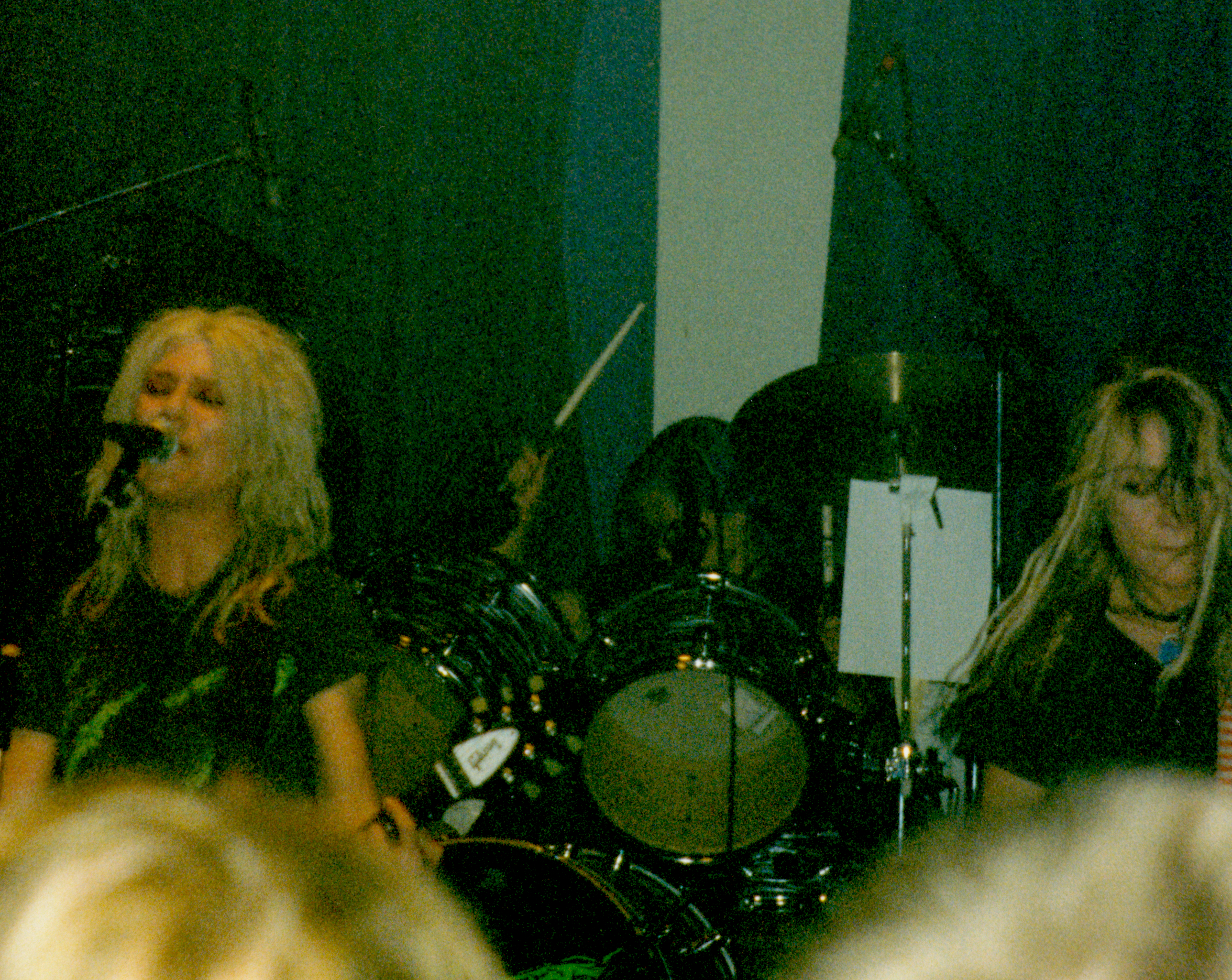
L7 performing at the Emerson Theater in Indianapolis in 1997

Record sales continued to wane during the late 1990s, and the band grew increasingly low on funds. However, the band's live performances consistently garnered praise, including a September 1999 review by rock critic Greg Kot in the Chicago Tribune that stated "Gardner and Sparks favor low-end guitar chug, a sound that suggests the idling engine of a Harley-Davidson more than the high-end squeal of most lead guitarists. They intersect with bassist Janis Tanaka to create a thick, sludgy bottom that rumbles the floorboards and shoots right through the sternums of innocent passersby. Their secret weapon remains drummer Dee Plakas." In 2000, the band raffled a one-night stand with Demetra Plakas at a London gig. The winner got to spend the night on the tour bus. Rolling Stone reported that Plakas and her bandmates decided "We're not being hypocritical about rock & roll anymore. Rock & roll is prostitution."

By 2001, L7 was no longer touring. The band listed the following statement on their website: "L7 is on an indefinite hiatus. We know that's vague, but that's just the way it is. The future of the band is a bit up in the air at the moment." L7 appeared to be defunct for all practical purposes. From 2007 to 2012, Sparks pursued another project, along with Plakas on drums, in their band Donita Sparks and the Stellar Moments. Finch formed several projects including OtherStarPeople and her punk rock group the Shocker. Tanaka played bass for Pink and Greenwood played with Bif Naked and later, the reformed Belly.

In 2012, Sparks started a Facebook page for the band, posting videos and archival images of L7, where their fan base quickly began to regroup.

=== Reunion (2014–2025) ===
On December 10, 2014, L7 announced, on their official Facebook page, that they were reuniting, featuring Donita Sparks, Suzi Gardner, Jennifer Finch and Demetra Plakas. As part of the reunion, the band revamped their website and included a mailing list for fans.

The reunited band kicked off a European tour at Rock am Ring in Germany on June 6, 2015 with shows in the Czech Republic, Austria, UK, France, and Spain. This was followed by North American dates in New York, Toronto, and at Riot Fest in both Denver and Chicago, and the Fun, Fun, Fun Festival in Austin, Texas. Exclaim! reviewed their Toronto show and stated that "Their subversive sense of humour and brash confidence provides feminism with some much-needed comic relief and audacity, and on this night, as 50-somethings in a 30-year-old band, they looked, acted and sounded every bit as brazen as they did 25 years back."

On February 15, 2016, L7's original drummer Koutsky died at the age of 53. Later in 2016, the documentary film L7: Pretend We're Dead, directed by Sarah Price, premiered in Los Angeles. The film, largely funded through Kickstarter, features original footage and interviews with the band members and eyewitness accounts of their development from Lydia Lunch, Shirley Manson, Krist Novoselic and Butch Vig. The film was nominated for a VO5 NME Award for Best Music Film.

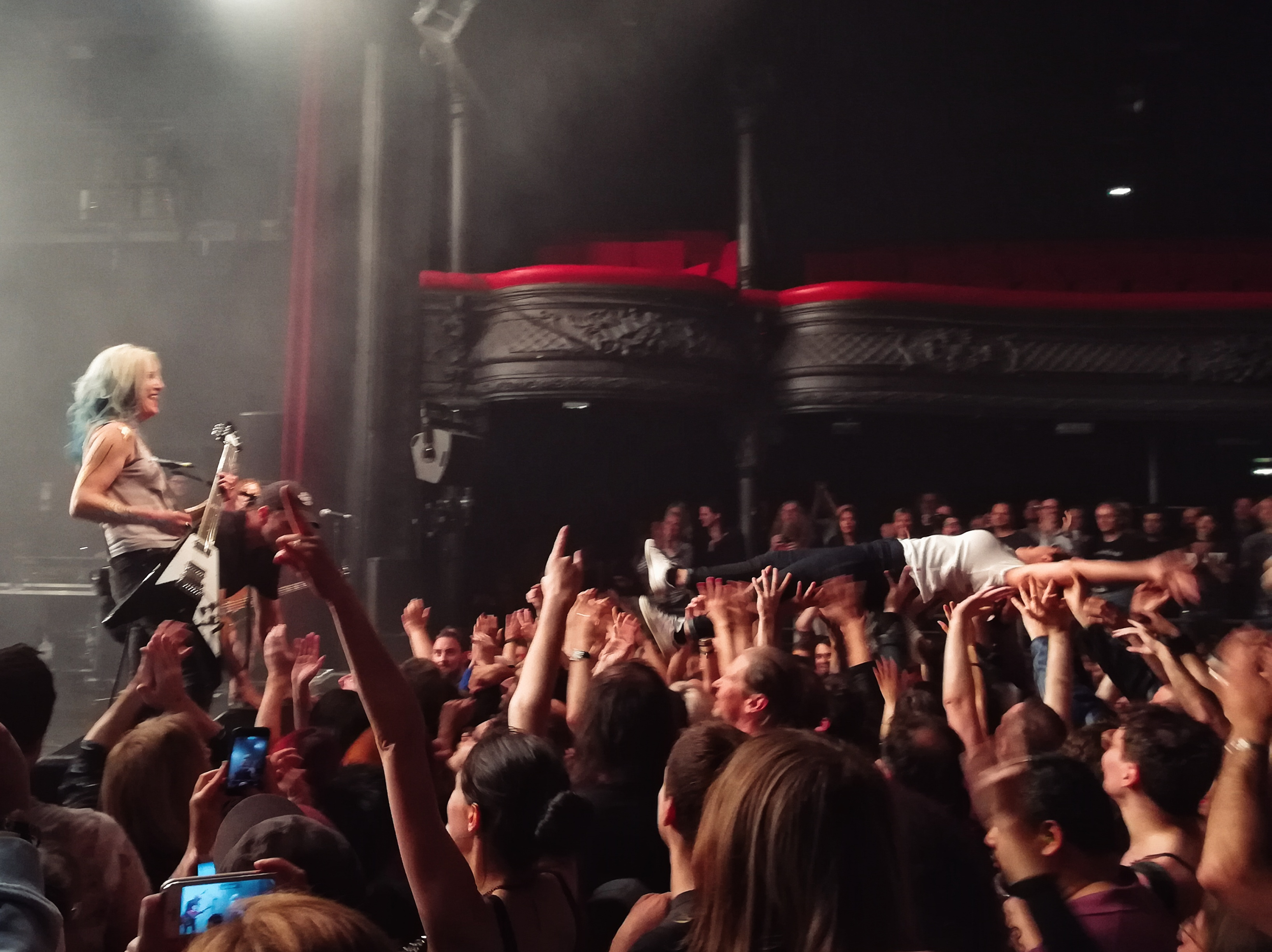
L7 performing in 2018

In 2016, L7 played a series of shows in the US, South Africa, the UK, and Australia. Chris Lane of Houston Press described the synergy of Sparks and Gardner's guitar playing and the strength of the band's live show stating "Their percussive styles seemed to be locked together, producing a glorious, unified wall of sound. Bass player Jennifer Finch bounced about the stage while propelling each song forward, and drummer Dee Plakas proved that she should be a lot more famous as a rock drummer with every fill."

On January 13, 2017, L7 released Detroit (Live) on record label Easy Action. The live album was originally recorded at a concert in the Motor city on September 1, 1990, and coincided with the group's initial release of Smell the Magic on Sub Pop records. Their performance at the established punk venue Clutch Cargo's in Detroit expressed the raw, kinetic energy of the era. L7 released Fast and Frightening (a collections of rarities, covers, and live performances) as a double album in 2016 with music critic Robert Christgau granting it an A minus in a 2018 review.

On September 29, 2017, L7 released its first new song in 18 years, "Dispatch from Mar-a-Lago" on Don Giovanni Records. The title is a reference to the Mar-a-Lago resort owned by Donald J. Trump. A follow-up single, "I Came Back to Bitch", was released in February 2018.

L7 continued to tour heavily in the US, Canada, and Europe in 2018. April 2018 saw the band announce their plans to record a seventh studio album via PledgeMusic, scheduled for release in 2019. The band went on tour shortly afterward. Including dates with Le Butcherettes as openers.

L7 released the first single from their first album in 20 years, "Burn Baby", on February 28, 2019. The full album, Scatter the Rats, was released on May 3, 2019, through Joan Jett's record label Blackheart Records. The album received generally favorable reviews. Hyperallergic referred to the band's legacy as "feminist punks, metal snarlers, (and) grunge comedians" and stated of their return album that Sparks and Gardner "pound out one solid, catchy, immediately identifiable power riff after another, more punk-minimalist than in their molten grunge period".

In April 2022, L7 announced a tour commemorating the 30th anniversary release of their third album, Bricks Are Heavy. The band played the entire album, along with several other songs. The tour consisted of eighteen scheduled shows through the month of October. L7 also announced a deluxe reissue of Bricks Are Heavy. Remastered by Howie Weinberg, the limited-edition release comes pressed on gold and black vinyl via Licorice Pizza, and pre-orders begun on September 30. Over the next three years the band would tour across North and South America, Europe and Australia playing festivals and support for bands like Foo Fighters and Garbage. On October 3, 2025, L7 played at The Belasco in Los Angeles celebrating their 40th anniversary.

=== The Last Hurrah Tour, Finch's death and Tanaka’s return (2026–present) ===
On May 7, 2026, the band announced dates for the first leg of their final North American tour "The Last Hurrah 2026", starting in October. The following month, in an interview with Seattle Weekly, Sparks said the group had an EP in the works and plans for another global tour.

On July 13, 2026, the band stated that Jennifer Finch had been diagnosed with an aggressive form of brain cancer and would no longer be part of the band's Last Hurrah tour. Finch's friends and family set up a GoFundMe, which raised near $400K for medical expenses and to release unfinished projects. Five days later on July 18, the band announced Finch had died at the age of 59. Bassist Tsuzumi Okai filled in for Finch during her illness. On September 8, the band announced via social media that former bassist Janis Tanaka was returning to the band for the final tour.

== Politics and activism ==
The band's name, L7, derives from a slang term for square. Formed and gaining exposure during a time when female musicians and bands were still routinely referred to with terms such as "chicks" and "foxcore", they deliberately chose a name that didn't draw attention to being an all-female band, to resist being typecast into roles the music industry typically expected of women. Sparks said, "We get letters from young girls who say that we're their inspiration for picking up an instrument, and that makes us really proud. We didn't really have role models growing up."

In 1991, the band formed Rock for Choice, a pro-choice women's rights group and concert series that raised funds to cover legal expenses for those affected by anti-abortion violence. The concept for Rock for Choice, generated by L7 and Sue Cummings, senior editor at the LA Weekly, was loosely modeled on Bob Geldof's Live Aid. L7 performed along with Nirvana, Sister Double Happiness, and Hole at the inaugural event held at the Hollywood Palace on October 25, 1991. Thanks to a conversation between members of L7 and Dave Grohl at an afterparty following the first show, subsequent Rock for Choice posters were designed in a distinctive underground comix style by SoCal artist Jim Evans/TAZ collective.

Rock for Choice founders L7 and Cummings, along with punk rock promoter and Cochella co-founder Rick Van Santen of Goldenvoice, laid the framework for the inaugural concert. The group created kits with information to empower activists to stage a Rock for Choice benefit in their own towns. The New York Times reported that within two years of launching Rock for Choice, there had already been 37 such concerts nationwide.

L7 performed at the September 27, 1992, Rock for Choice benefit concert at the Hollywood Palladium along with Exene Cervenka, the Red Hot Chili Peppers, and Mudhoney. In October 1993, seven bands played a sold out Rock for Choice benefit including the beloved Los Angeles bands X and Firehose, and featuring the headliner Rage Against the Machine. L7 band members took to the stage, each in a guise of a beauty contestant wearing a sash listing a city where anti-abortion violence had erupted: Sparks as "Ms Bakersfield, CA," Plakas as "Ms. Lancaster, PA," Finch as "Ms. Peoria, IL," and Gardner as "Ms. Newport Beach, CA."

Later Rock for Choice concerts included the Foo Fighters, Ween, Pearl Jam, and other prominent bands of the era. L7 returned their focus to their music, reducing their involvement with Rock for Choice, which continued on independently through 2001.

== Other appearances ==
The band appeared in John Waters' 1994 film Serial Mom under the name "Camel Lips".

Their songs have been featured on the soundtracks of numerous films, including Natural Born Killers, Point of No Return, and Pet Sematary Two. "Shove" appears on the soundtrack of the movie Tank Girl and "Pretend We're Dead" appears on the soundtrack of the video game Grand Theft Auto: San Andreas. "Andres" is available as downloadable content for the Rock Band 4.

Finch and Plakas performed several times with Japanese artist hide in 1994.

L7 appeared on TV shows such as Late Night with David Letterman, The Jon Stewart Show, The Word, 120 Minutes, and Alternative Nation. The band played at Reading Festival in 1992 having been chosen for the concert by Nirvana band leader Kurt Cobain, Glastonbury Festival in 1994, Lollapalloza in 1994, Finsbury Park in 1997, and on the Warped Tour in 1995 and 1999. They toured with and opened for artists including Bad Religion in 1988, Gwar in 1989, Nirvana and Alice in Chains in 1990, Red Hot Chili Peppers, Faith No More, Rollins Band and Beastie Boys in 1992, Pearl Jam in 1994, Marilyn Manson and The Offspring in 1997, and Ministry in 1999.

The band, with Finch returning on bass, appeared in the 1999 cult video Decoupage: Return of the Goddess, performing the Sonny and Cher song "Bang Bang (My Baby Shot Me Down)" with actress Karen Black, and being interviewed individually by Decoupage hostess Summer Caprice.

The video for "Pretend We're Dead" was featured on an episode of Beavis and Butthead. In a later episode, while discussing who would win in a battle between Tiffany, Wilson Phillips, and Debbie Gibson, the characters state their belief that "one chick from L7 could kick all their asses combined".

Throughout the mid-2000s, the band's song "Shitlist" was used as the entrance music of professional wrestler Jon Moxley, who would later become widely known under the name Dean Ambrose upon joining WWE in 2011. The song was also used in ECW by Brian Pillman (under his loose cannon gimmick) in 1996, until his departure the following year.

== Musical style, influences, and legacy ==
L7's sound has been described as "unique and unforgiving, mixing a punk rock attitude with heavy sludge metal." A 2019 article on L7 in Alternative Press stated that "In the early-'90s underground, L7 were positively bulletproof and larger than life. Not as come-hither nymphs or saucy rock star minxes bestowed with privilege but as a hard-rocking unit" that could not be messed with. The band has been categorised as alternative metal, alternative rock, grunge, punk metal and punk rock. On the metal side of the band's sound, Donita Sparks acknowledged in July 2018 that L7 has metal influences but does not consider the group to be a "metal band", instead stating "at heart, we're punk rockers".

Aesthetically, their style was subversive with a long-standing resistance to the expectation for girls to be eye-candy. L7 called themselves "slob girls" with ratty hair and clothes and bassist Jennifer Finch frequently performed barefoot onstage. Sparks summarized "If we were gonna be looked at, we were gonna be thrashin."

A reviewer in 1995 stated that "L7 plays slow-riffing hard rock, fast punk rock and bluesy, catchy midtempo songs: generic forms upgraded by smart lyrics and pure irreverence on stage."

Donita Sparks credits the punk rock bands the Ramones and the Sex Pistols as two of her earliest influences, stating of the former that, at age 15, "I was so longing for teenage music, stuff that was fun and carefree and cool. And the Ramones were the whole package", having stated in 1997 that Rocket to Russia (1977) was the record that changed her life. Sparks has also noted 1960s surf music, namely the Beach Boys, Dick Dale and the Ventures, as a key influence, describing it as her "siren song" to move to Los Angeles in the 1980s. The band also draw heavily from female-fronted 1970s and 1980s punk and new wave acts (see women in punk rock) including the B-52's, Blondie and Frightwig. Suzi Gardner, more so than Sparks, was influenced by blues-based 1970s rock and early metal acts, such as Black Sabbath, Deep Purple, Hawkwind and Led Zeppelin. Other influences on members of the band include ABBA, AC/DC, the Beatles, David Bowie, Patsy Cline, Elvis Costello, the Cramps, Arethra Franklin, the Gap Band, Kraftwerk, Motörhead, Ohio Players, Yoko Ono, Iggy Pop and the Stooges, Lou Reed, the Rolling Stones, Roxy Music, and Sha Na Na. Other influences they cited included Soundgarden, Nirvana, Black Flag, Bad Religion, the Ramones, Blondie, the Pretenders, the Runaways, Kiss, Girlschool, Slayer and AC/DC.

The Prodigy covered the Hungry for Stink track "Fuel My Fire" on their 1997 album The Fat of the Land. In 2015, Spin listed Bricks Are Heavy as number 249 on their list of the top 300 Best Albums of the Past 30 Years (1985–2014). Decibel ranked the songs from L7's Bricks Are Heavy as part of their Hall of Fame Countdown in 2016. In 2016, Ugly Things ranked Smell the Magic at number 24 on a list of the top 40 punk albums of all time. In 2017, Metal Injection ranked L7 at number 7 on their list of "10 Heaviest Grunge Bands".

The band was listed by Kerrang! in 2019 as one of "Ten Bands No One Expected to be So Influential Today." The group was described as "one of rock's most volatile and respected acts. Predictable on paper, anything but on stage".

== Band members ==
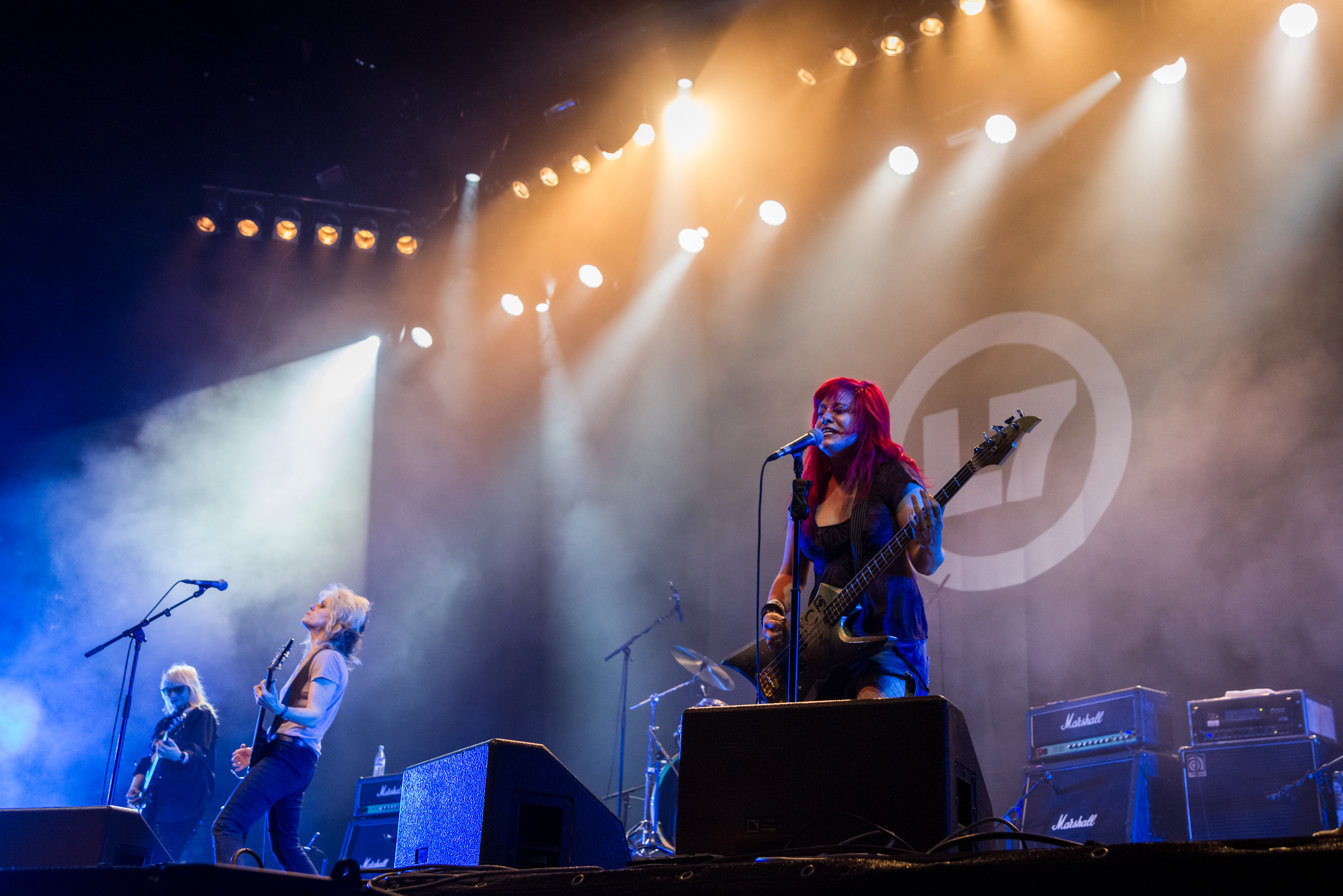
L7 performing at Rock am Ring in 2015

Current

- Donita Sparks – lead vocals, guitar (1985–2001, 2014–present)
- Suzi Gardner – guitar, backing and occasional lead vocals (1985–2001, 2014–present)
- Demetra Plakas – drums, backing vocals (1989–2001, 2014–present)
- Janis Tanaka – bass, backing vocals (1999–2001, 2026–present)

Past

- Jennifer Finch – bass, backing and occasional lead vocals (1986–1996, 2014–2026; her death)
- Roy Koutsky – drums (1986–1988; died 2016)
- Anne Anderson – drums (1988–1989)
- Greta Brinkman – bass (1996–1997)
- Gail Greenwood – bass, backing vocals (1997–1999)
- Tsuzumi Okai – bass (2026; touring substitute for Jennifer Finch)

== Discography ==
- L7 (1988)
- Smell the Magic (1990)
- Bricks Are Heavy (1992)
- Hungry for Stink (1994)
- The Beauty Process: Triple Platinum (1997)
- Slap-Happy (1999)
- Scatter the Rats (2019)
