= Jennifer Finch =

American musician and photographer (1966–2026)

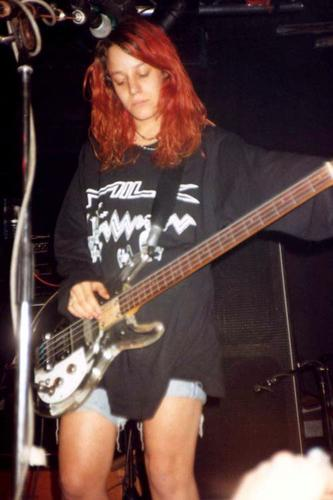
- Finch performing in the 1990s

Background information
- Also known as: Jennifer Precious Finch
- Born: August 5, 1966; Boyle Heights, Los Angeles, California, U.S.
- Died: July 18, 2026 (aged 59) Santa Monica, California, U.S.
- Genres: Alternative metal; grunge; punk rock; heavy metal
- Occupations: Musician; photographer
- Instruments: Bass; vocals
- Years active: 1979–2026
- Formerly of: Betty Blowtorch; L7; The Shocker; Sugar Babydoll

Jennifer Finch (born Erin Michelle Fredin ; August 5, 1966 – July 18, 2026) was an American musician, designer and photographer most notable for being the primary bass player of the punk rock band L7. Active in L7 from 1986 to 1996, and again from 2014 to 2026, Finch also wrote music and performed with her bands OtherStarPeople and The Shocker in the interim before joining the reunited L7 in 2014.

== Early life and photography ==
Erin Michelle Fredin was born on August 5, 1966 in a Salvation Army home for unwed mothers in the Boyle Heights district of Los Angeles. She was adopted by Robert Edward Finch, an aeronautics engineer, and Sandra Jacobson Finch, an Air Force veteran, and was raised in West Los Angeles. She took an interest in photography at an early age and attended a summer art session at Otis Parsons in 1980.

At the age of 13, Finch began to take photos of her friends in Los Angeles on a camera given to her by her father. These pictures eventually documented the early punk scene that she became involved in before joining L7 in 1986. Her photography (1979–1995) was on display at an LA Weekly sponsored art show at Aidan Ryley Taylor Gallery in Hollywood, until November 18, 2006. The collection, called 14 and Shooting, featured a number of notable figures, including the Red Hot Chili Peppers, Bad Religion, Redd Kross, and The Cramps. The collection traveled to the Rock and Roll Hall of Fame for display in January 2007.

Finch graduated from high school in 1984. She attended San Francisco State University.

== Career ==
=== Music ===
Finch began her musical career in the mid 1980s. She played bass in the San Francisco–based band Sugar Babydoll (or Sugar Babylon) from 1984 to 1986. The band featured Courtney Love, future founder of Hole, and future Babes in Toyland founder Kat Bjelland. This line-up produced a demo recording which remains unreleased. Finch subsequently played in the short-lived Hollywood band The Pandoras, formed by bassist Gwynne Kahn.

In 1986, Finch joined the Los Angeles-based punk rock group L7. In the documentary film L7: Pretend We're Dead, bandmate Donita Sparks described Finch as "persistent" and stated that after Finch joined the band, her networking skills and stage energy continued to significantly boost the momentum building within the group. She was also known for her trademark style of performing barefoot. She remained with L7 throughout the band's most successful period in the early 1990s. Finch contributed to the albums L7 (1988), Smell the Magic (1990), Bricks Are Heavy (1992), and Hungry for Stink (1994). Finch was the sole songwriter during this period for several of L7's songs including "(Right On) Thru", "Everglade" and "Shirley".

In 1994, Finch was featured in a music video for Hole for their breakthrough album Live Through This, as the original bassist Kristen Pfaff had died of an overdose in June of that year. In 1995, after the death of her father, Finch adopted the name "Precious" as an homage to him. Finch officially departed L7 in 1996. Finch cited health and money issues, as well as grieving over the loss of her father, as reasons for her departure.

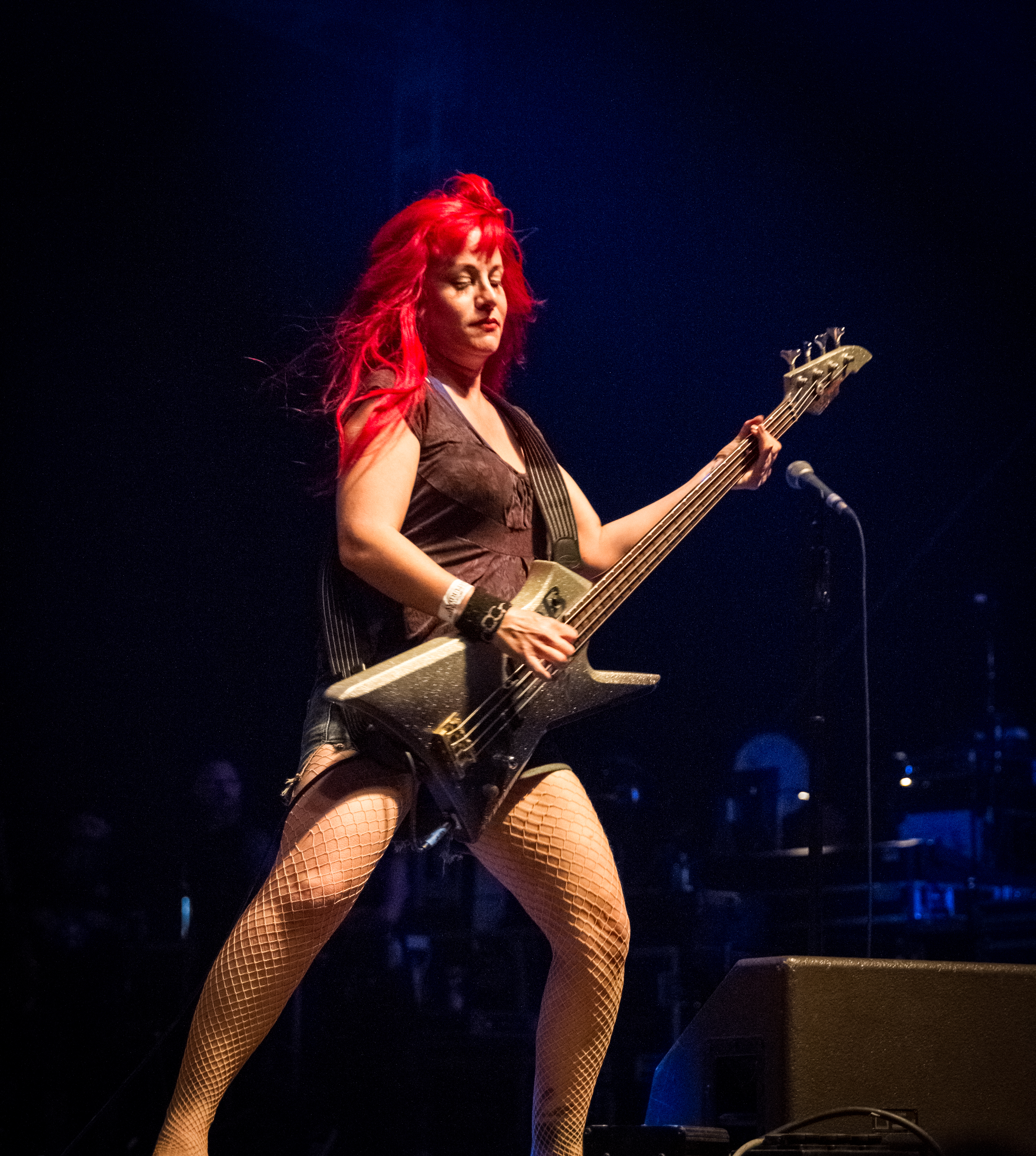
Jennifer Finch in 2015

After departing from L7, Finch wrote music and sang for her band OtherStarPeople with Xander Smith. OtherStarPeople completed their debut record Diamonds In The Belly Of The Dog in 1998; the group were signed with A&M Records/Interscope and the album was released in August 1999. Joshua Clover of Spin magazine described the OtherStarPeople record as bringing "less weight and more strangeness than Finch's old crew – it's L.A. – slick and punky-dirty".

Finch founded the punk rock group The Shocker in Los Angeles in 2002; they released Up Your Ass Tray as an EP in 2003, followed by a full-length album in 2006 on Go-Kart Records. In January 2011, Finch co-founded new band Sex in Progress along with Evie Evil of Evil Beaver.

In 2014, L7 reformed with their classic line-up of Finch alongside Suzi Gardner, Donita Sparks, and Dee Plakas. The album Scatter the Rats was released on Blackheart Records on May 3, 2019, to generally favorable reviews. Finch wrote the song "Garbage Truck".

=== Film, TV, and other activities ===
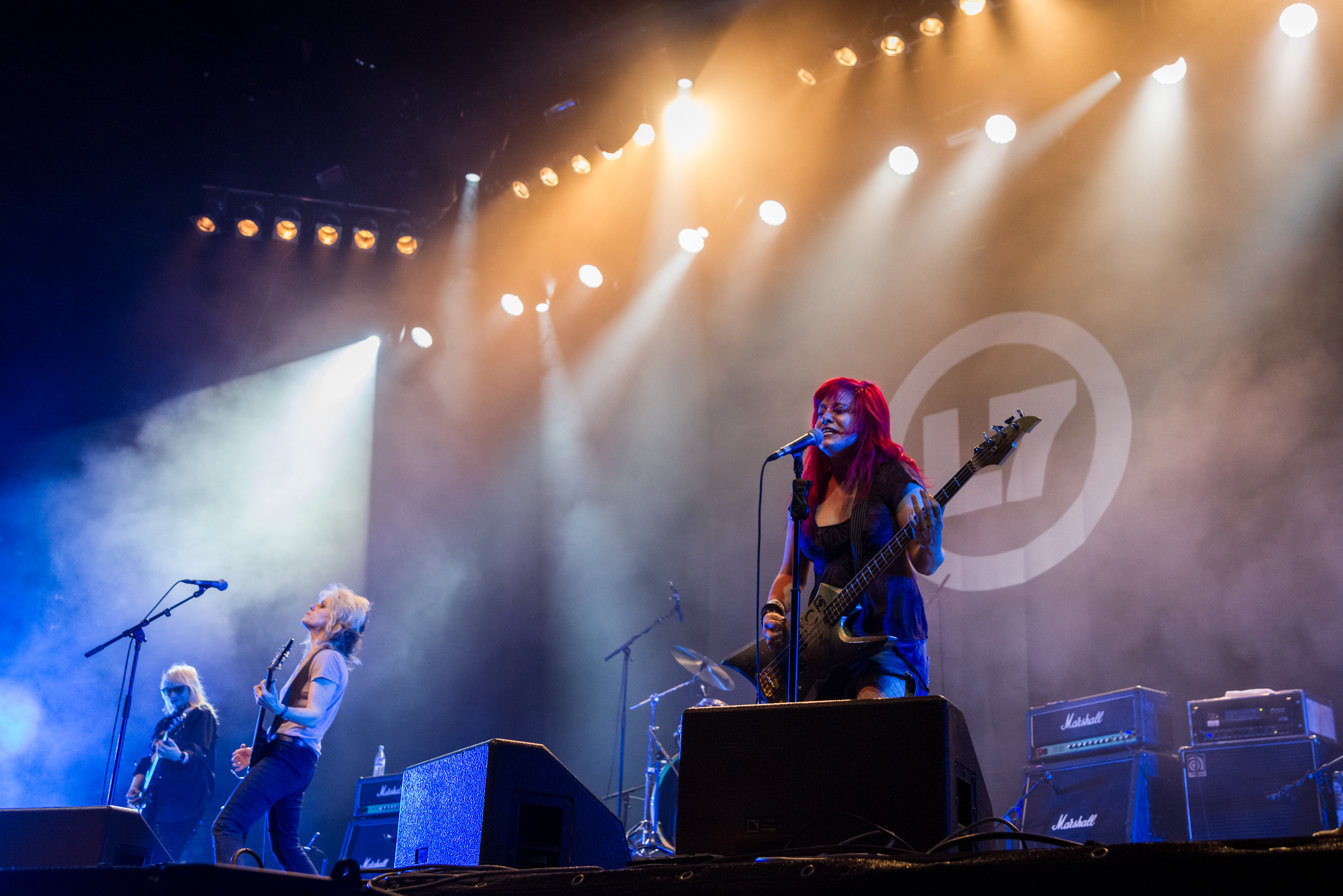
Finch performing with L7 in 2015

Finch acted in the 1994 John Waters film Serial Mom, appearing as a member of the fictional band Camel Lips.

Her song "Then There's None" was included on the Office Space soundtrack.

Finch is featured as an interviewee in the 2021 documentary What Drives Us, directed by Dave Grohl.

Finch founded Little Pusher Records. She also worked as a photographer, writer, graphic designer and digital-media professional.

== Personal life and death ==
Finch resided in Culver City, California. In the early 1990s, she dated Dave Grohl, then of Nirvana. Finch was married to actor Christian Pedersen. They divorced in 2007.

In 2011, she was diagnosed with thyroid cancer but recovered prior to L7's reunion.

On May 7, 2026, L7 announced dates for the first leg of their final tour "The Last Hurrah 2026", starting in October. However, on July 13 the band announced that Finch had been diagnosed with aggressive brain cancer, which prevented her from taking part in the tour. Finch's friends and family set up a GoFundMe campaign to help her pay for her treatments, recovery, and ongoing care, which was contributed to by many well-known musicians and reached nearly $400,000 in just five days. She died in Santa Monica, California, on July 18, at the age of 59.

After Finch's death, it was announced she had finished writing a memoir prior to her illness. Shooting Up and Making Out: A Memoir of My Life in L.A. and L7 is scheduled for release on January 19, 2027.

== Discography ==
=== L7 ===
- L7 (1988)
- Smell the Magic (1990)
- Bricks Are Heavy (1992)
- Hungry for Stink (1994)
- Scatter the Rats (2019)

=== OtherStarPeople ===
- Diamonds in the Belly of the Dog (1999)

=== The Shocker ===
- Up Your Ass Tray EP (Oglio Records, 2003)
- Up Your Ass Tray: The Full Length (Go Kart, 2006)

== See also ==
- List of female bass guitarists
- List of barefooters
