= Demetra Plakas =

American musician

Demetra "Dee" Plakas
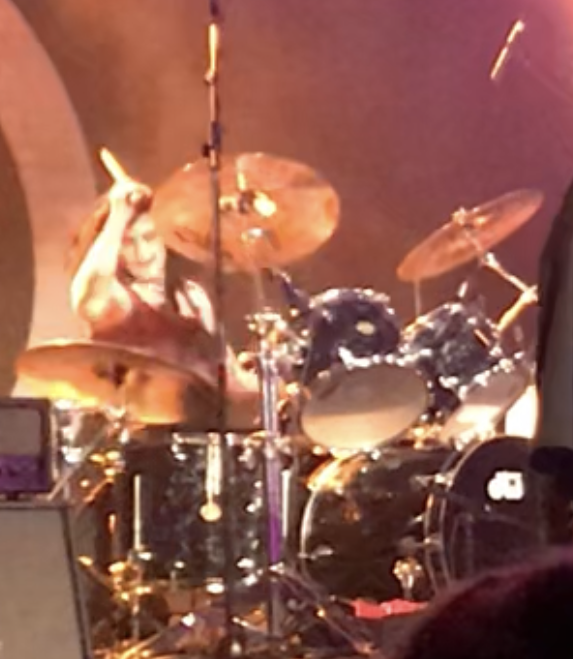
- Plakas performing in 2019

Background information
- Also known as: The Goddess of Thunder, Dee
- Born: Demetra Plakas; November 9, 1960 (age 65); Chicago, Illinois
- Genres: Alternative metal; grunge; alternative rock; punk rock; heavy metal
- Occupation: Drummer
- Instruments: Drums; percussion; vocals
- Years active: 1982–present
- Labels: Epitaph Records; Sub Pop; Slash Records; Wax Tadpole Records; Blackheart Records

Demetra Plakas (born November 9, 1960) is an American musician, best known for being the drummer in the rock band L7.

== Early life ==
Plakas was born November 9, 1960, in Chicago, Illinois. Her parents immigrated independently from Greece and later met in Chicago. Plakas has a younger sister. She learned to play the drums while in high school.

== Career ==
=== Early bands ===
In the late 1970s, Plakas joined a punk band called Problem Dogs. Although she had never played drums before, she purchased a set and learned to play as the band practiced in the basement of bass player Algis Kizys's house.

In the thriving Chicago punk scene, the band played sporadic gigs at places like Space Place and O'Banion's, opening for The Bangles at The Metro. They also released a single, "City Hall/ You Are The Knife", following the departure of Kizys in 1982. Plakas moved to the greater Los Angeles metro area in 1985.

The band went through several personnel changes, with original bandmates Plakas, Rick Radtke and John Connors reforming as Pirate Radio after arriving in Los Angeles.

=== L7 ===
After witnessing her playing drums with Pirate Radio in 1987, a contact from LA Weekly informed Plakas that the punk rock group L7 was looking for a drummer. Two months later, after Donita Sparks contacted her, Plakas agreed to join L7.

Once Plakas joined the band, L7 gelled and gained in momentum. Sparks stated “we found that sweet spot with Dee. That was a huge break for us. Because she was what we had been missing. She had the same sensibility as us: we’re punks but we’re doing hard rock.” She was given the name "The Goddess of Thunder" by her band mates. Plakas played drums on six of the seven L7 studio albums, including on the band's hit single Pretend We're Dead from 1992's Bricks Are Heavy. The band appeared on the main stage of Lollapalooza in 1994.

In 1994, Plakas and her L7 bandmate Jennifer Finch performed with the Japanese musician Hide, also appearing on the original video for his song "Doubt".

Plakas appeared in the John Waters film Serial Mom as a musician and performer in the fictitious band "Camel Lips" in 1994.

Plakas and L7 were the subject of a 1998 pseudo-documentary film by Krist Novoselic entitled L7: The Beauty Process.

L7 disbanded in 2001 but was reunited again in 2014.

=== Other projects ===
During the hiatus when L7 was dormant, Plakas went on to play drums in solo projects by both herself and former L7 member Donita Sparks. In 2007-2008, Plakas toured with Donita Sparks and the Stellar Moments in support of the release of Transmiticate. Ken Tucker, then editor at large for Entertainment Weekly, stated that Dee Plakas "continues to drum with a fluid power" and "propels much of the music" on the album.

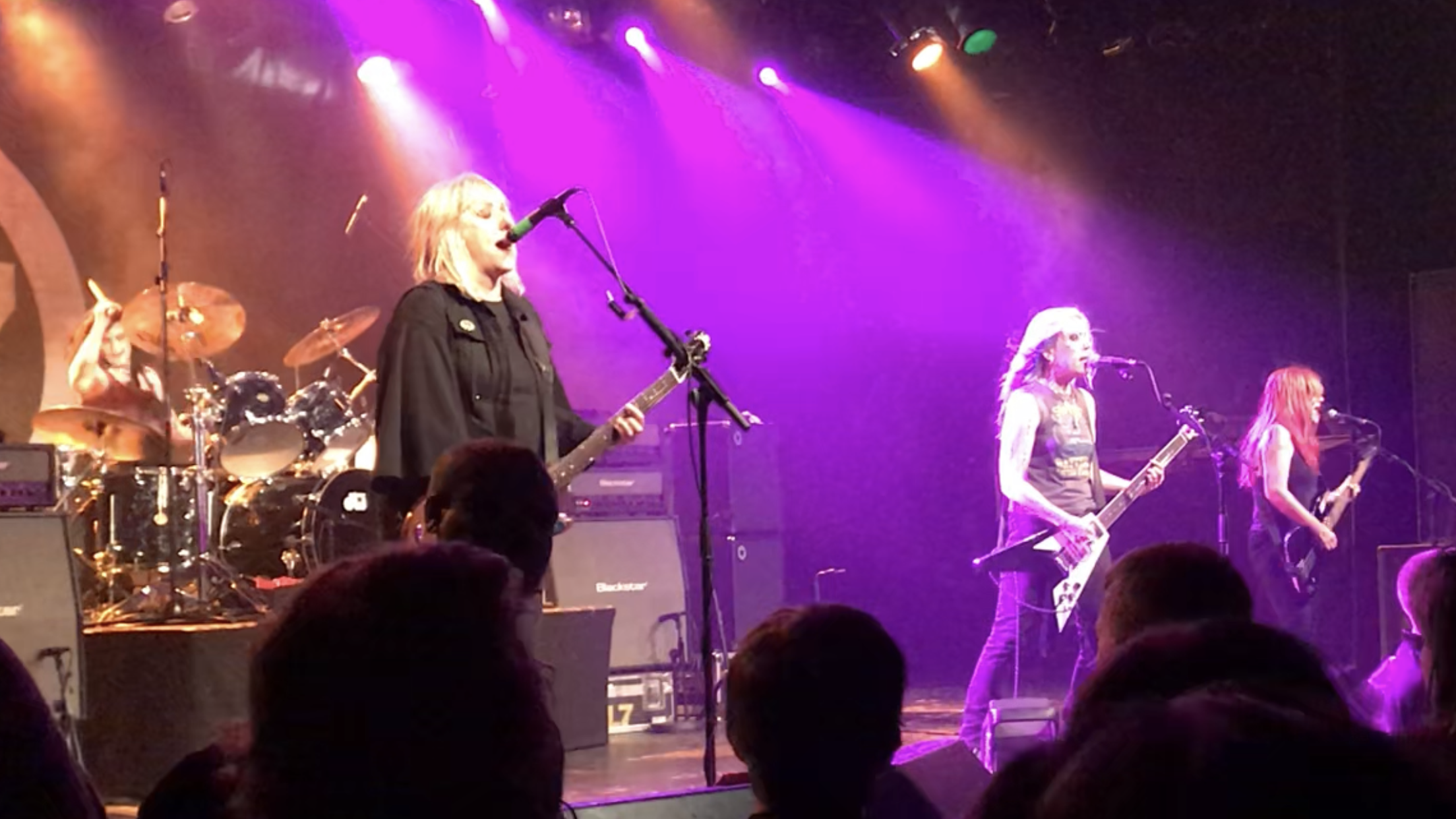
Dee Plakas (left) performing with L7 in Vancouver, BC in 2019

=== L7 reunion ===
Original footage and interviews with Plakas can be viewed in the documentary film L7: Pretend We're Dead directed by Sarah Price, released November 2016. The film was nominated for a VO5 NME Award for Best Music Film.

L7 released their latest full-length album Scatter the Rats on May 3, 2019, through Joan Jett's Blackheart Records. The album received generally favorable reviews. Plakas and L7 announced a six-week nationwide tour with a start date of May 10, 2019.

In April 2019, Plakas reported that she was endorsed by Drum Workshop and had been using their Black Velvet kit on tour.

== Notable stage moments ==
Plakas is perhaps most infamous for a contest held during a live show in London in 2000 in which L7 raffled off a one-night stand with her. The winner got to spend the night on the tour bus.

== Personal life ==
In 1989, Plakas married musician and creative director Kirk Canning, who later played cello on Nirvana's song "Something in the Way" She resides in Santa Monica, California.
