= Slash Records =

American record label

- Parent company: PolyGram (1996–2000); Warner Music Group (2000-present)
- Founded: 1978
- Founder: Bob Biggs
- Defunct: 2000
- Status: Dormant
- Distributors: Reprise/Warner Records (United States/Canada); London Records (1986–2000; international); Rhino Entertainment Company (reissues)
- Genre: Punk rock; indie rock; alternative rock
- Country of origin: United States
- Location: Los Angeles, California

Slash Records was an American record label originally specializing in local punk rock bands, active from 1978 to 2000. It was notable as one of the first and most successful independent record labels in alternative music, before its eventual acquisition by Warner Music Group.

== History ==
The label was formed in 1978 by Bob Biggs. Biggs, a painter, initiated the label with a seven-inch single from the Germs in 1978. A full album from that band was released the next year, and X's Los Angeles followed in 1980. The label was distributed through Jem until 1981 when that company went bankrupt. Slash then entered into a distribution deal with Warner Bros., a move that was among the first collaborations between a self-started indie and a major label. During the time of this arrangement, the label released albums by prominent Los Angeles punk and rock and roll bands, including Fear, The Blasters, L7 and Los Lobos, as well as comparable punk and garage rock bands such as Austin's Rank and File and Boston's Del Fuegos.

The label flourished even after the magazine stopped in 1980. A subsidiary, Ruby Records, was started in 1981; Ruby released albums by Misfits, Dream Syndicate, and The Gun Club. By the mid-1980s, Slash had branched out beyond Southern California, releasing albums by Robyn Hitchcock and Burning Spear. From 1982 until 1996, releases from Slash Records were distributed in North America by Warner Bros. Records and Reprise Records, and elsewhere by PolyGram.

The label was sold to London Records in 1996. Universal Music Group (the owner of American Decca) was formed through the merger of the MCA and PolyGram Records families, the latter of which owned London Records, in 2000 and closed Slash as an active label. When London Records president Roger Ames moved to Warner Music Group, he retained the rights to London and Slash, and the back catalogue of Slash was acquired by Warner (excluding Rammstein and Harvey Danger). In 2003, Ames relicensed the use of the name Slash back to Bob Biggs, who then relaunched the label. The revived label only released one album, the eponymous debut album by Shiner Massive, before it was closed again due to "high losses".

As of 2018, Slash solely exists as a reissue label. Between 2016 and 2017, Warner Music, the parent company of Slash, sold off the rights to several former Slash artists; this included the sale of Violent Femmes to Concord Music, Failure to PIAS Recordings, Soul Coughing to Swedish indie Woah Dad!, and Grant Lee Buffalo to Chrysalis Records.

Biggs died in October 2020.

== Notable artists ==
- Asian Dub Foundation
- The Blasters
- BoDeans
- Bonnie Hayes with the Wild Combo
- Burning Spear
- The Del Fuegos
- Dream Syndicate
- Failure
- Faith No More
- Fear
- The Flesh Eaters
- Germs
- Grant Lee Buffalo
- Green on Red
- The Gun Club
- Harvey Danger
- Imperial Teen
- The Knitters
- L7
- Los Lobos
- Misfits
- The Chills
- The Plugz
- Rammstein
- Rank and File
- Robyn Hitchcock
- Sons of Freedom
- Soul Coughing
- Steel Pole Bath Tub
- Tribe
- Violent Femmes
- The Wild Flowers
- X
