= List of atheists in music =

This is a list of atheists in music. It documents atheists who have composed and/or performed music. Living persons in this list include those whose non-religiosity is relevant to their notable activities and public life, and who have publicly identified themselves as atheists.

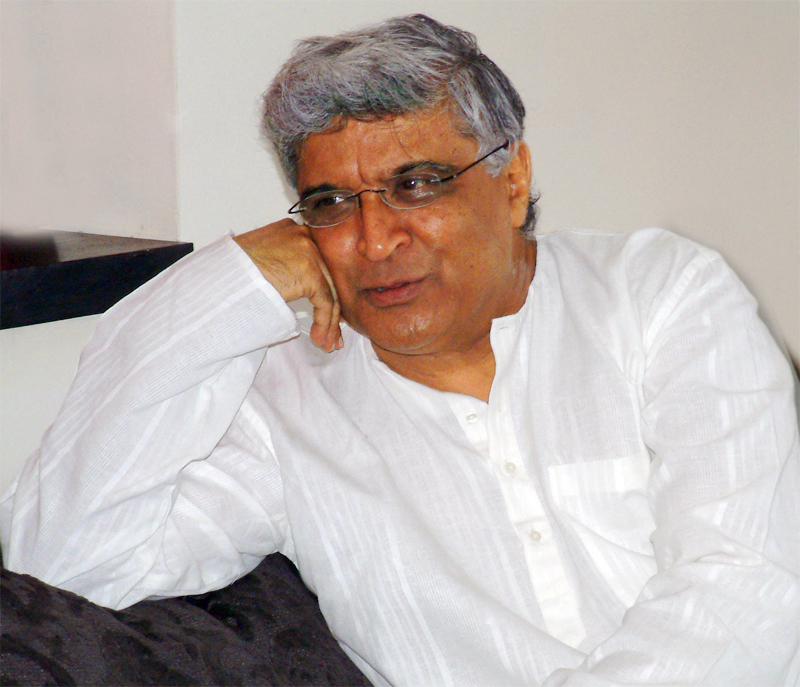
Javed Akhtar

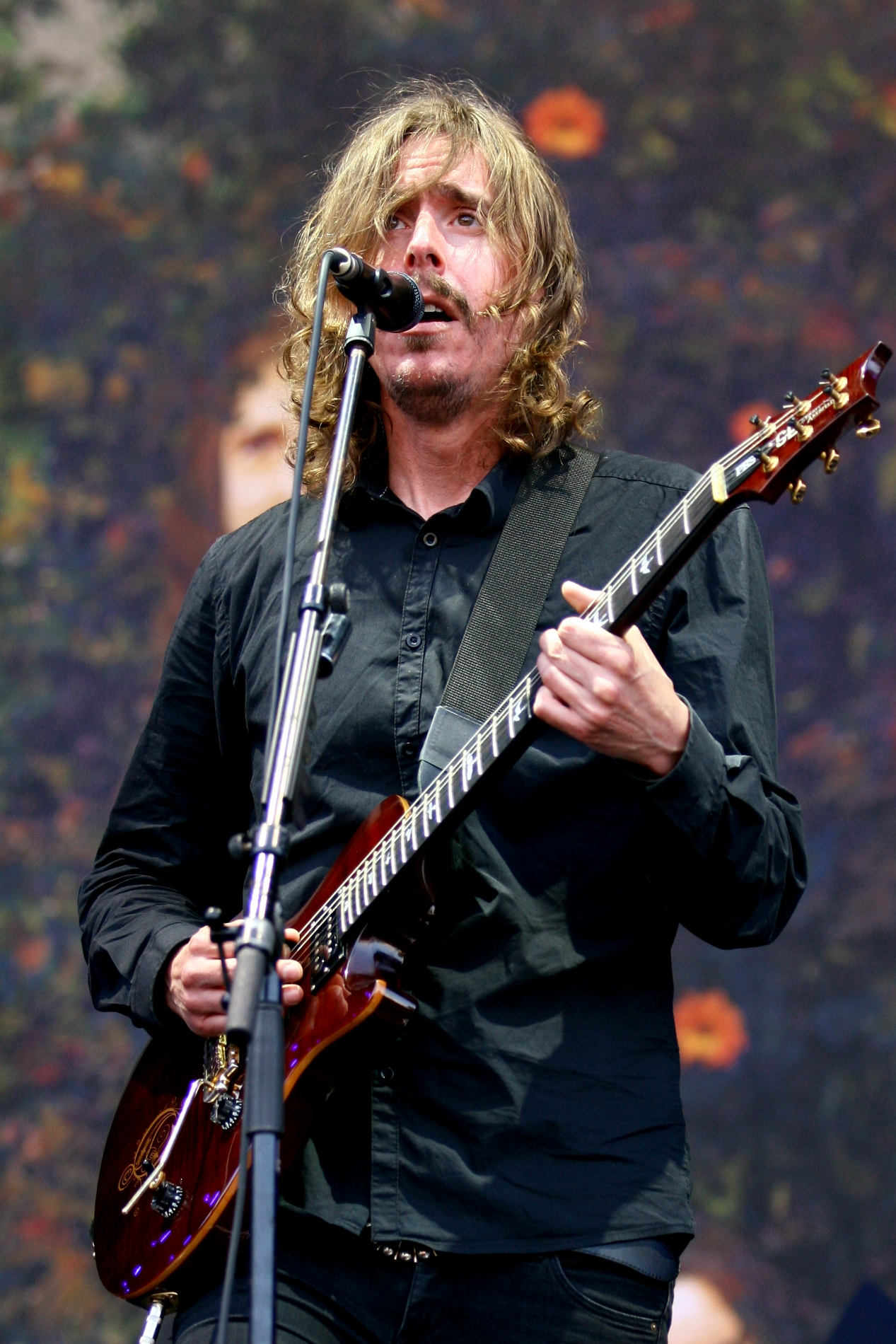
Mikael Åkerfeldt

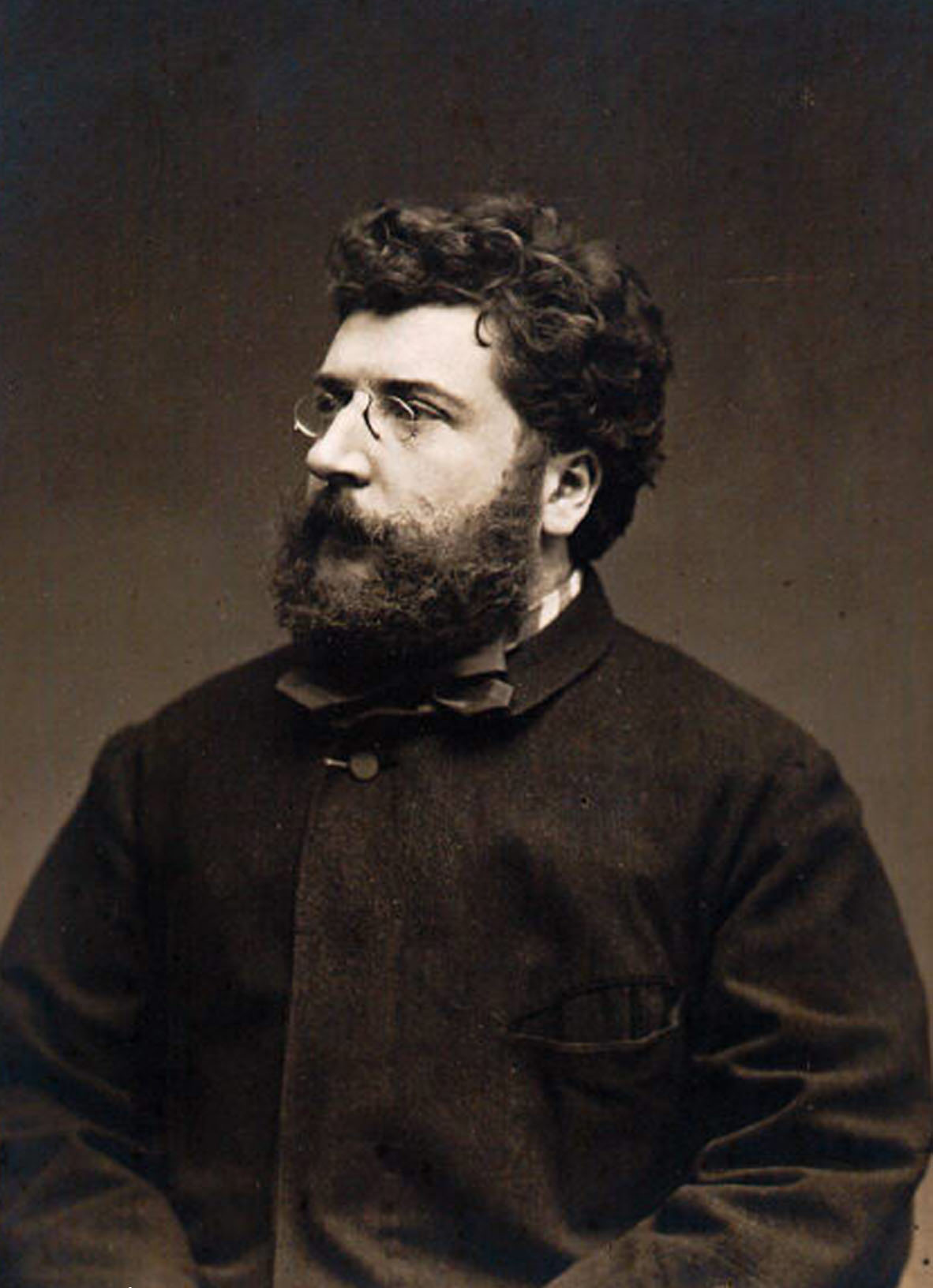
Georges Bizet

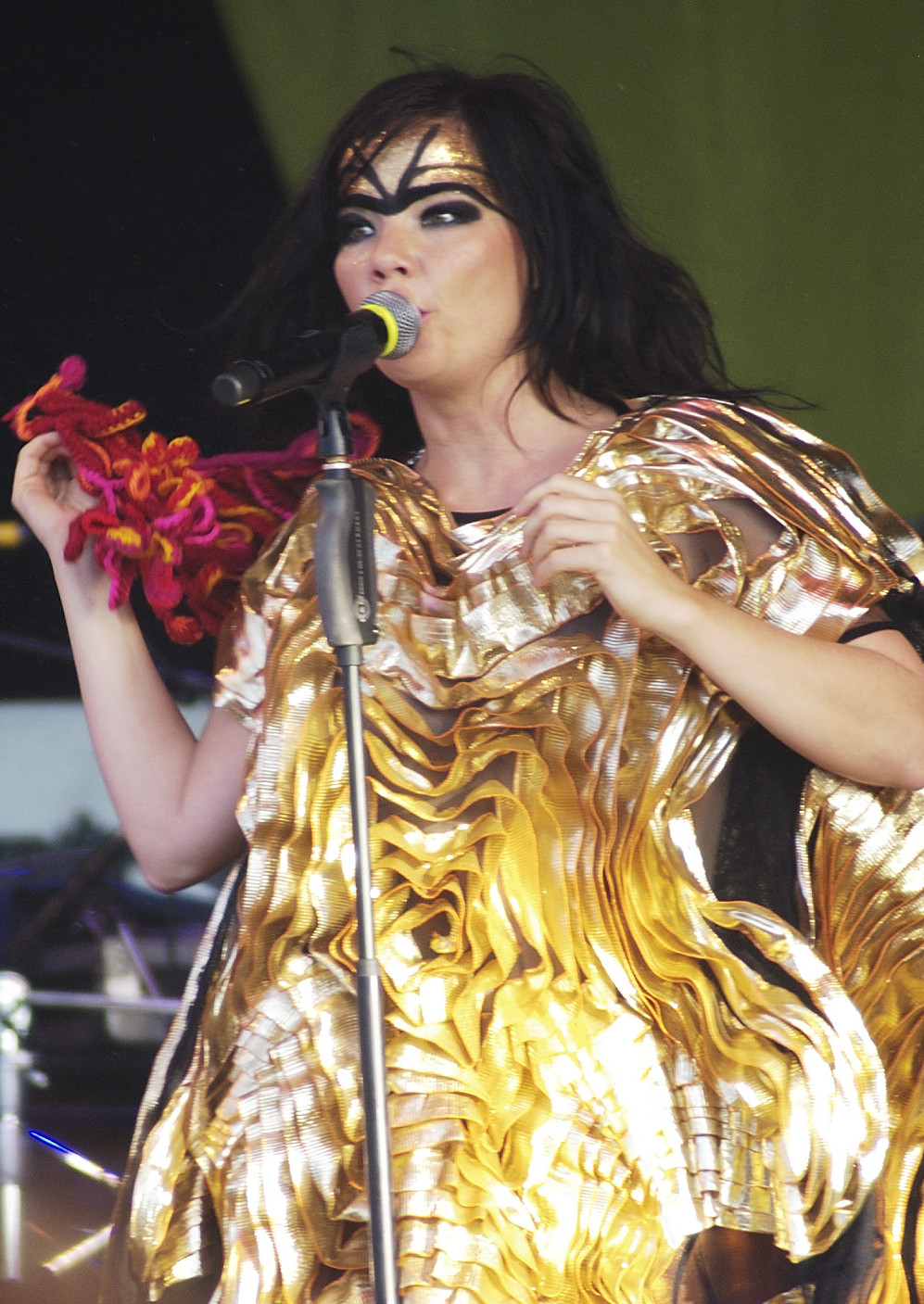
Björk

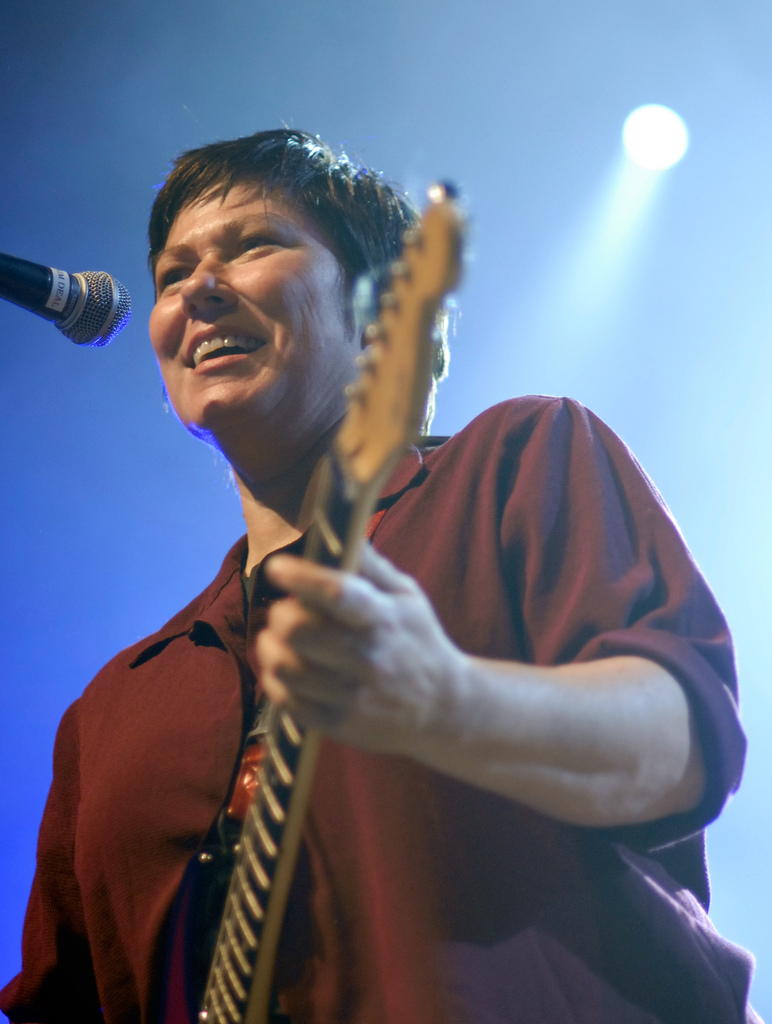
Kim Deal

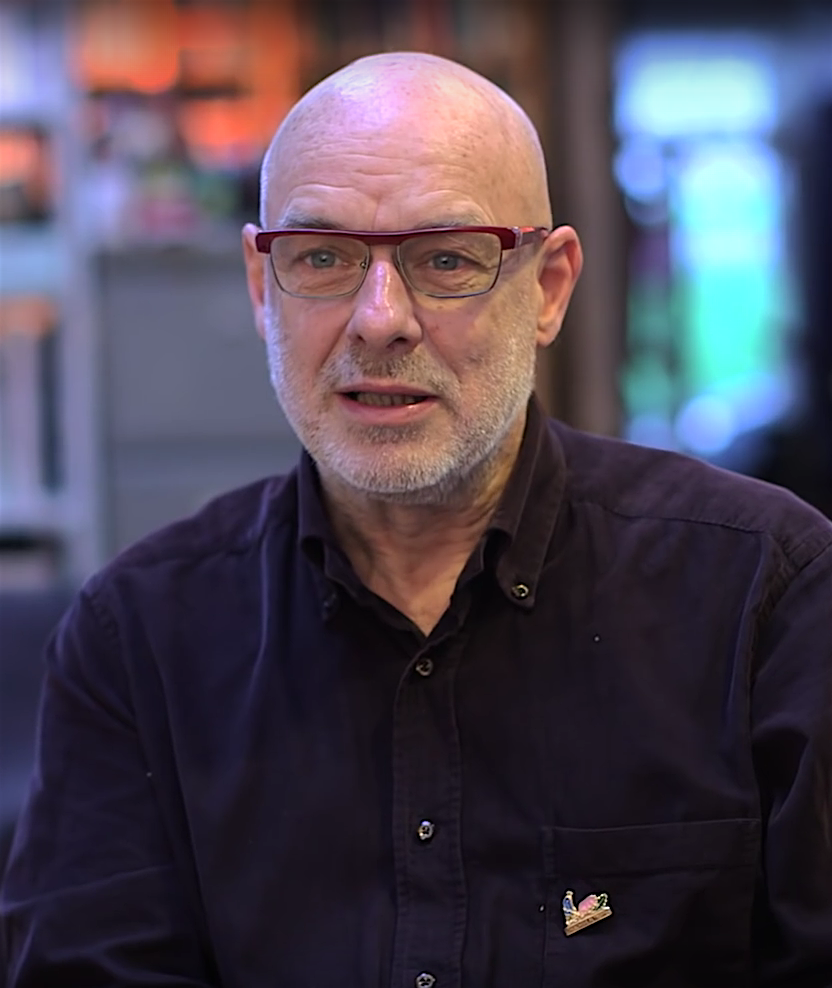
Brian Eno

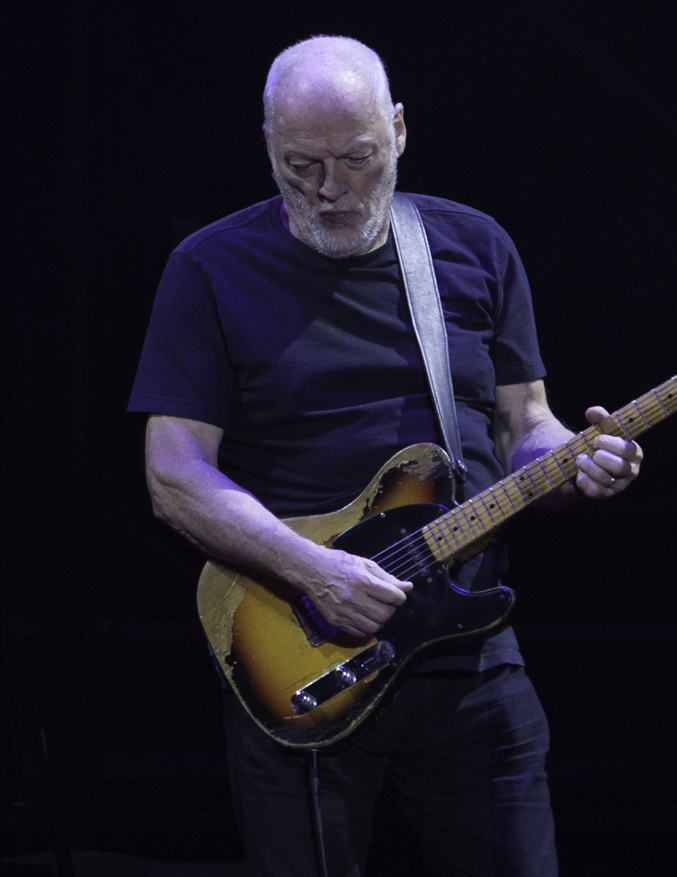
David Gilmour

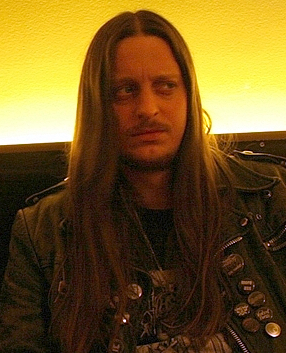
Fenriz

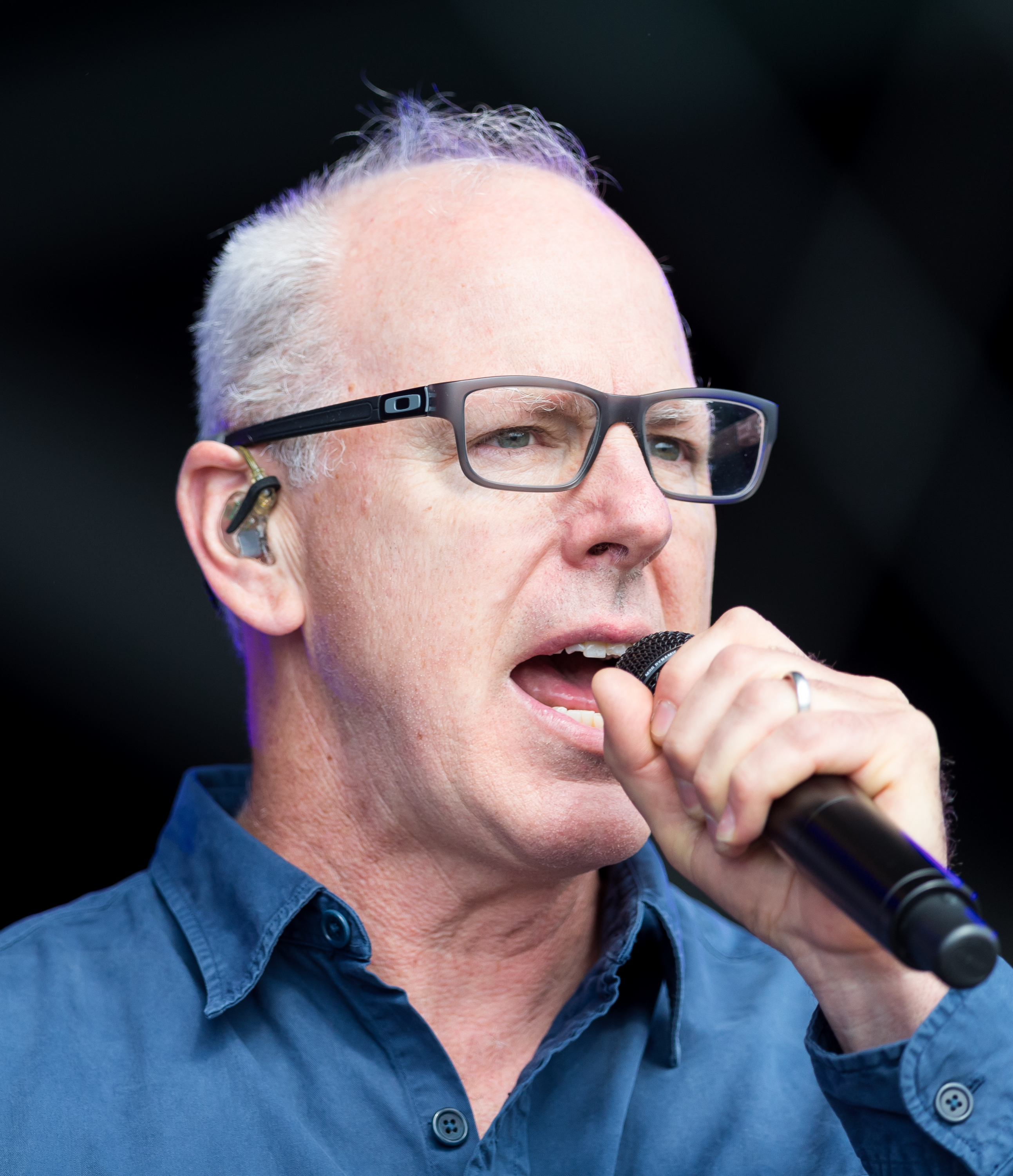
Greg Graffin

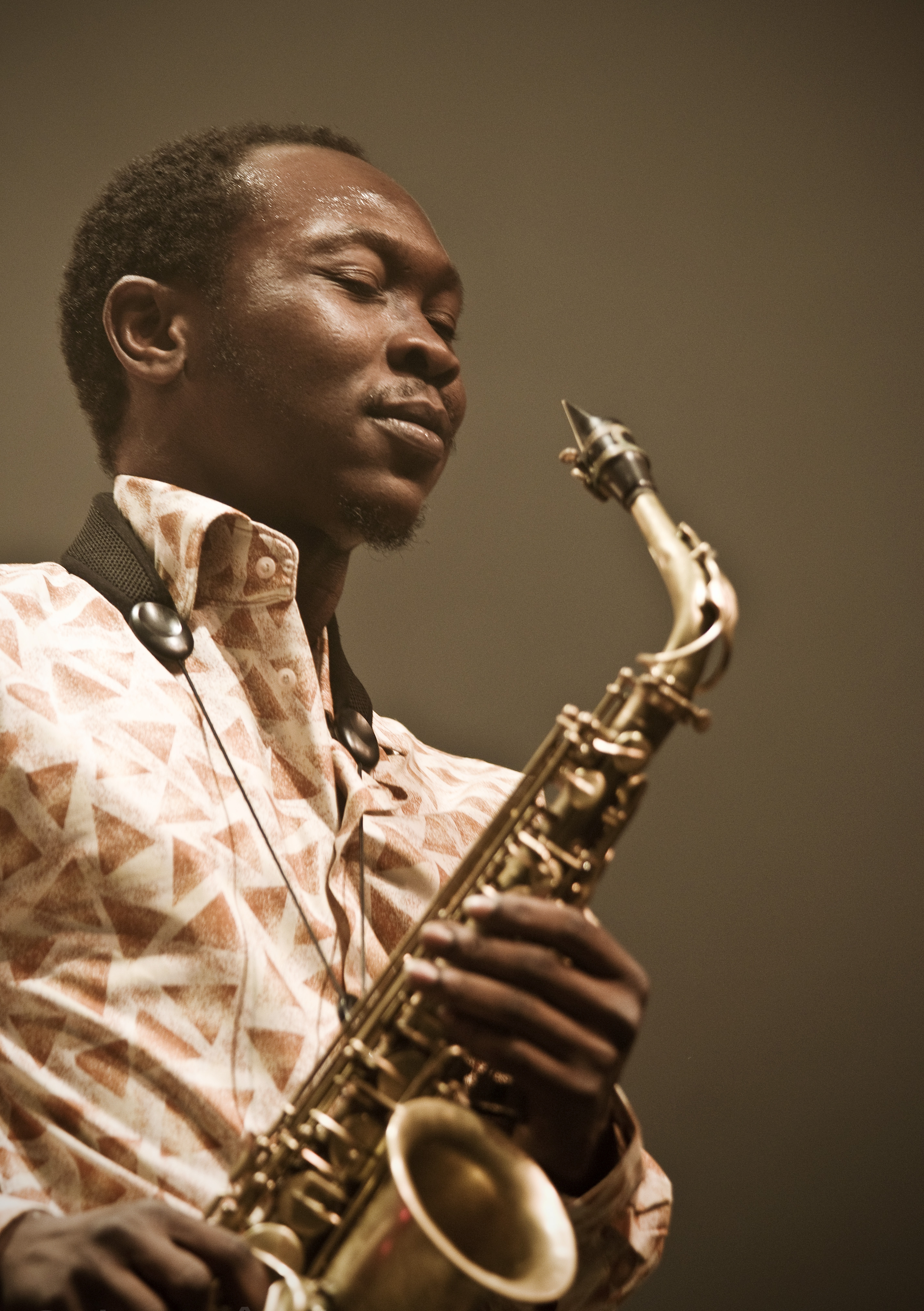
Seun Kuti

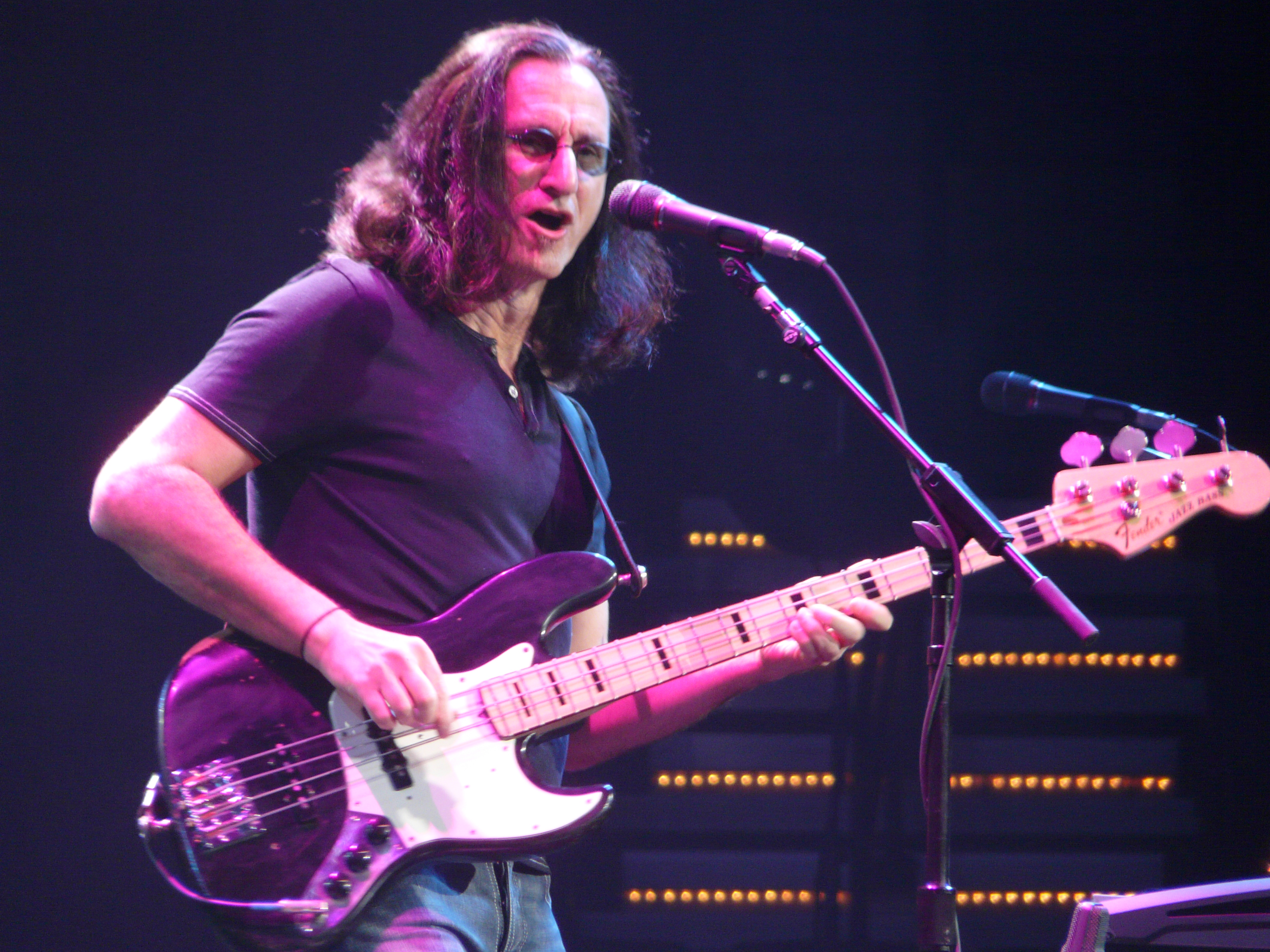
Geddy Lee

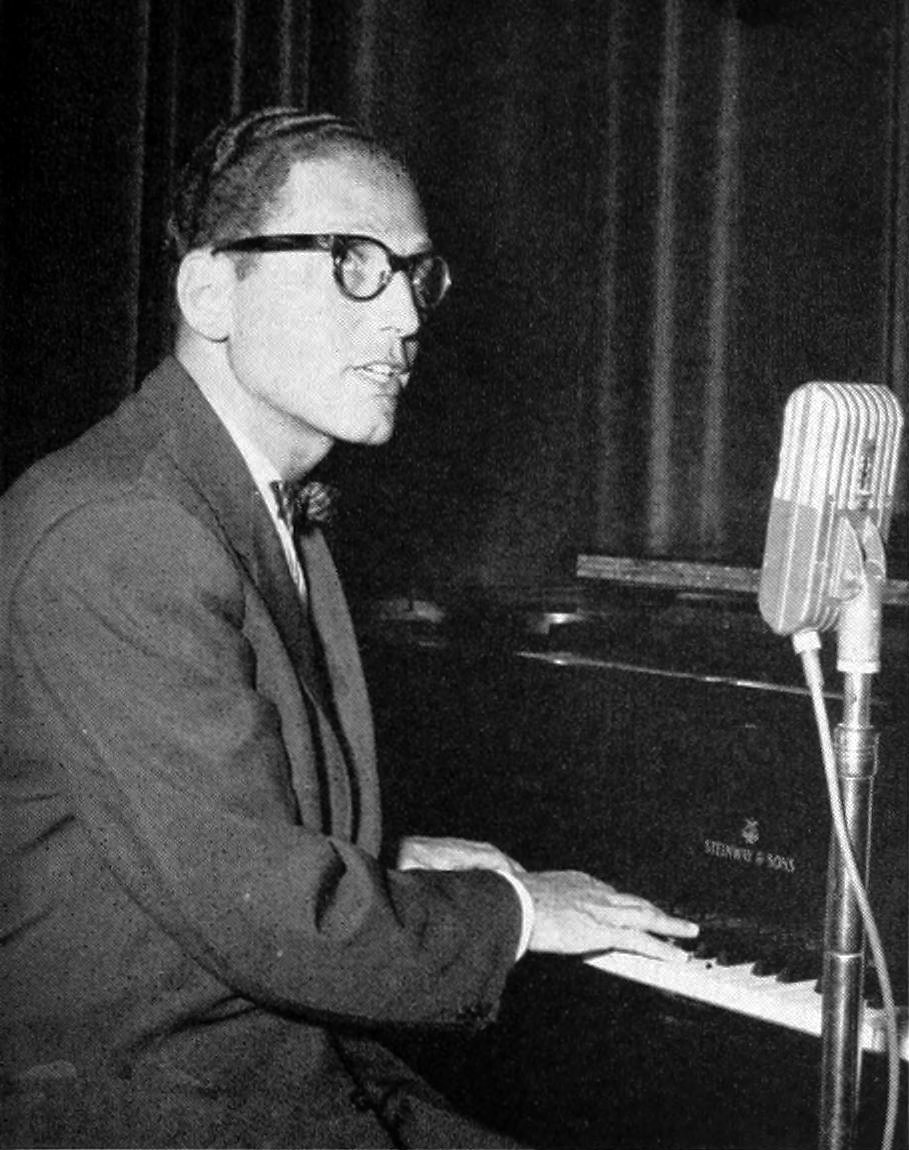
Tom Lehrer

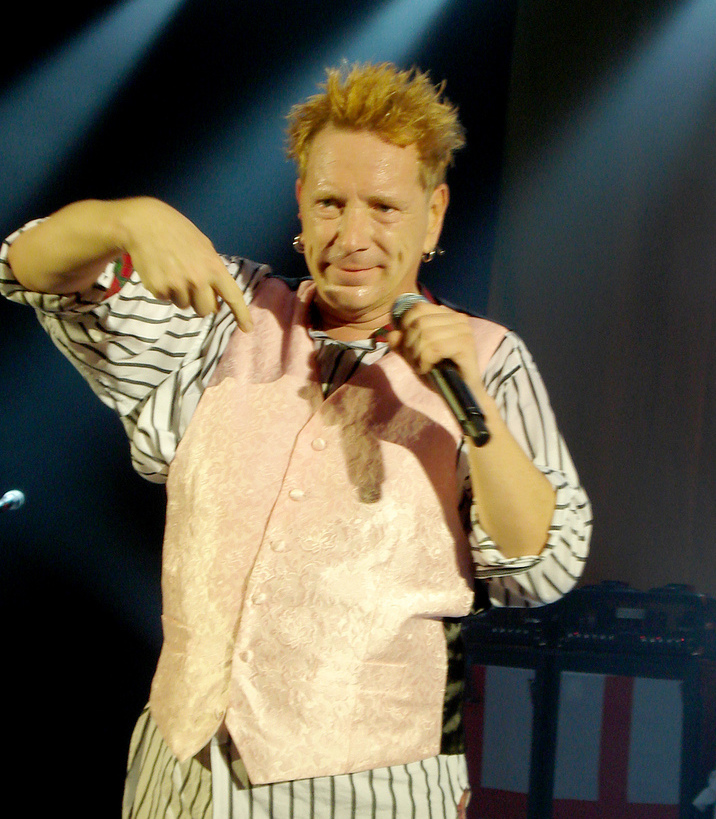
John Lydon

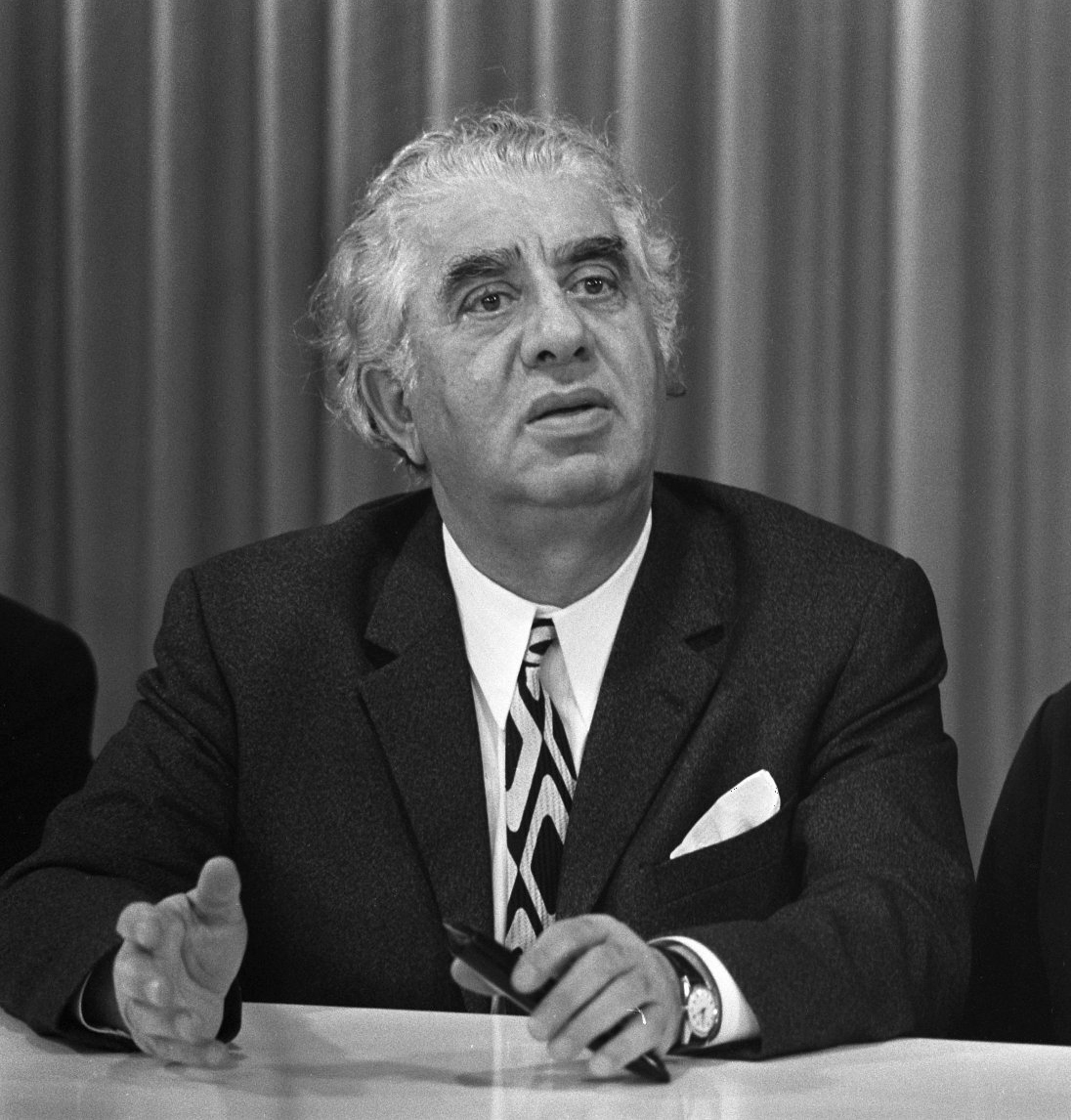
Aram Khachaturian

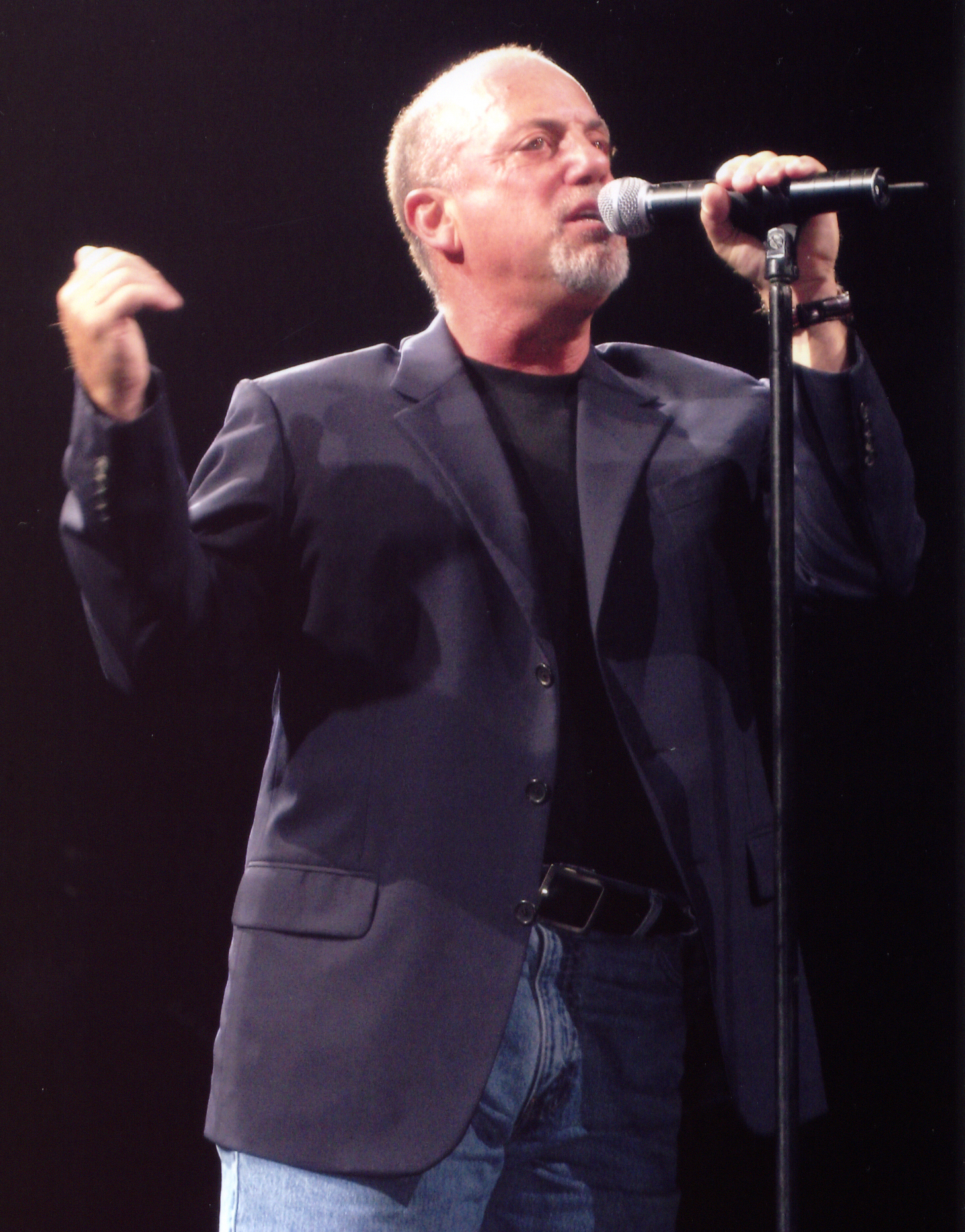
Billy Joel

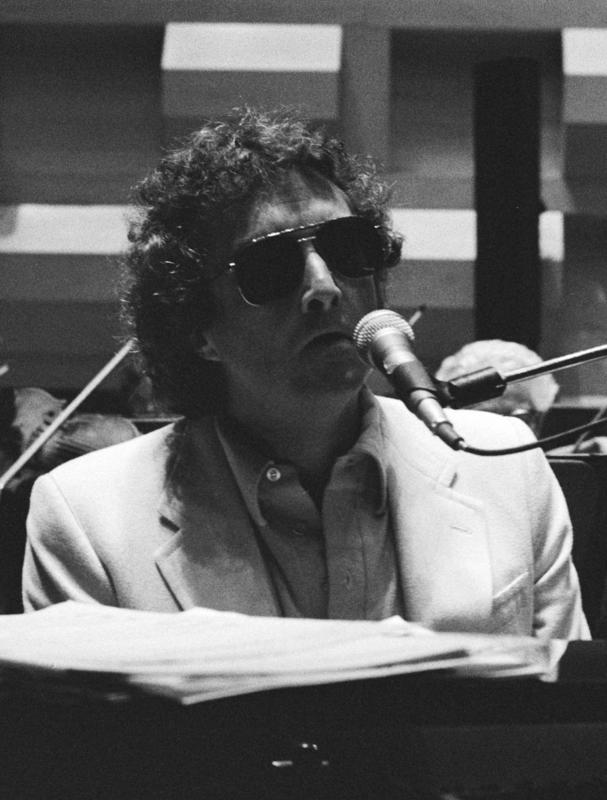
Randy Newman

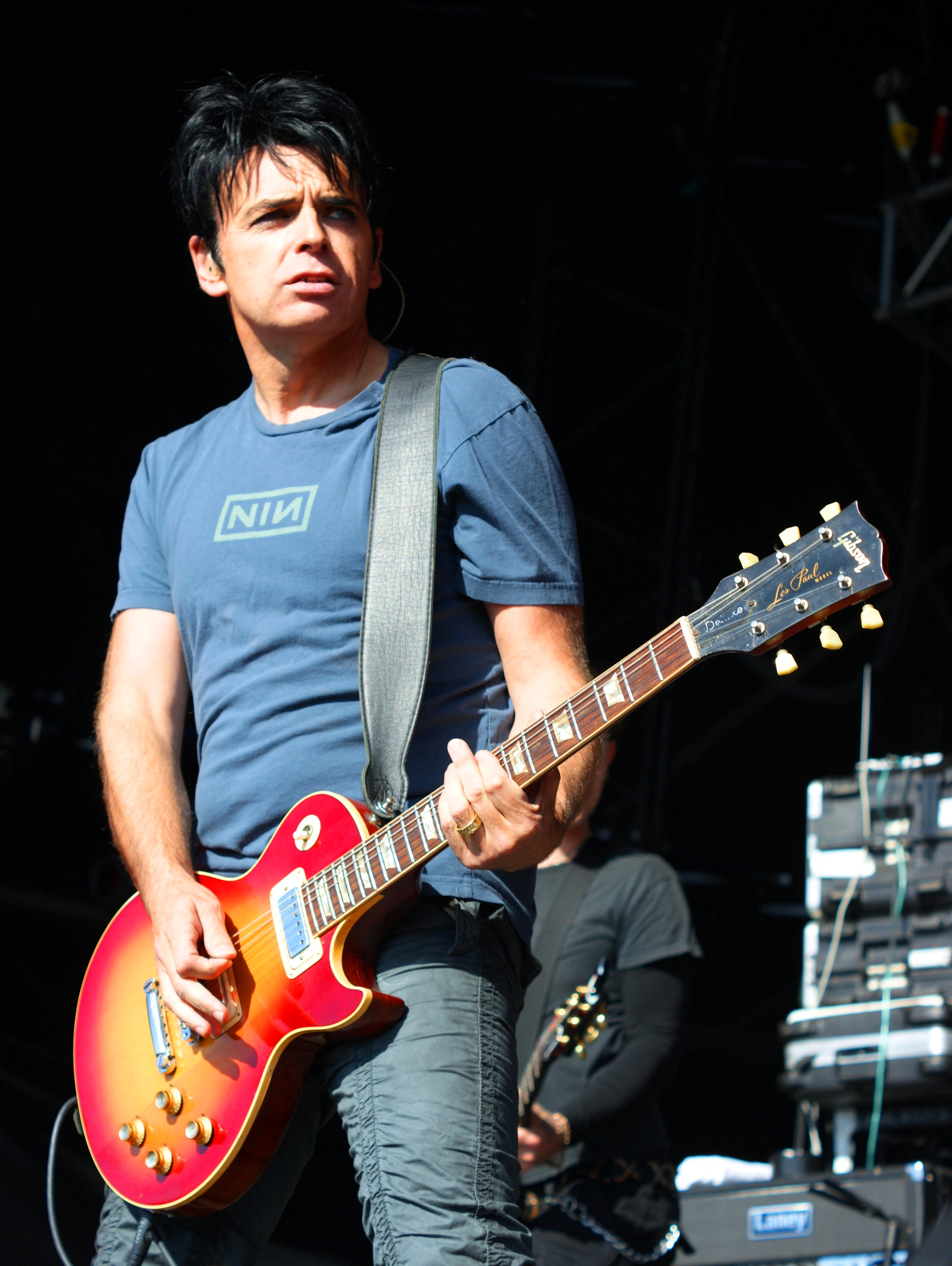
Gary Numan

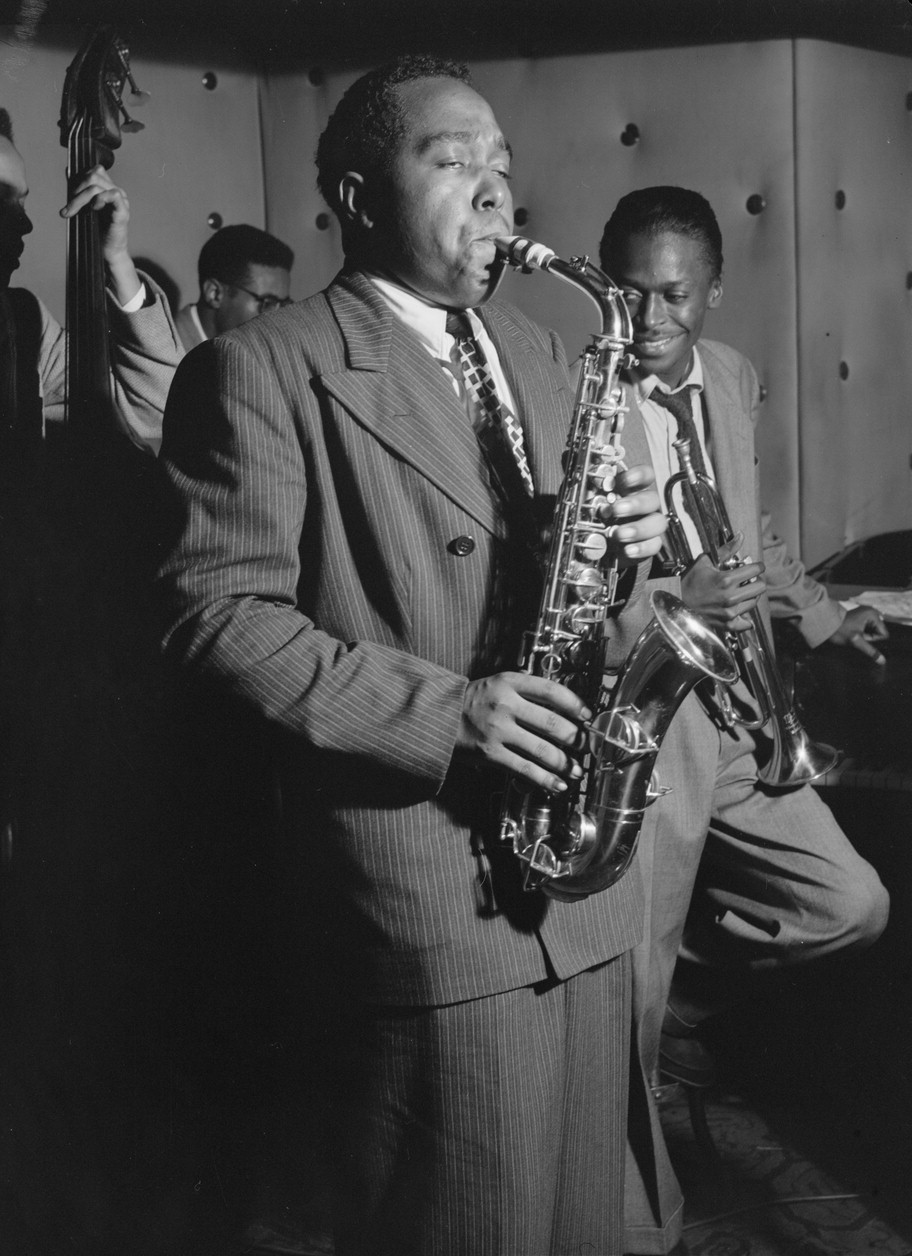
Charlie Parker

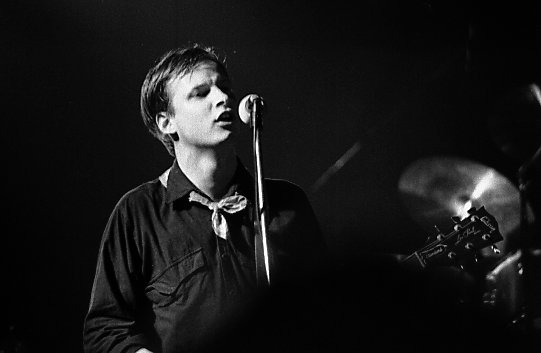
Andy Partridge

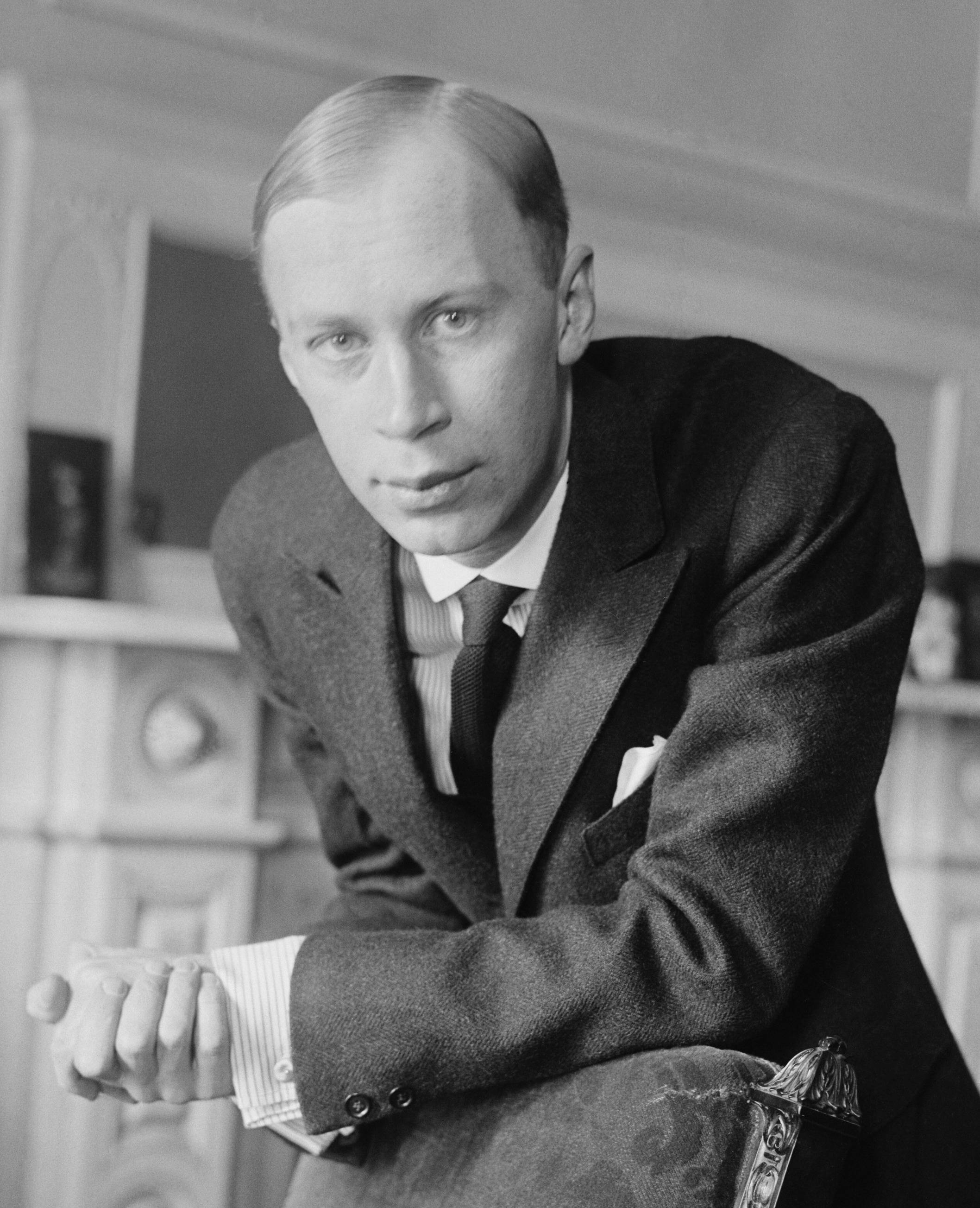
Sergei Prokofiev

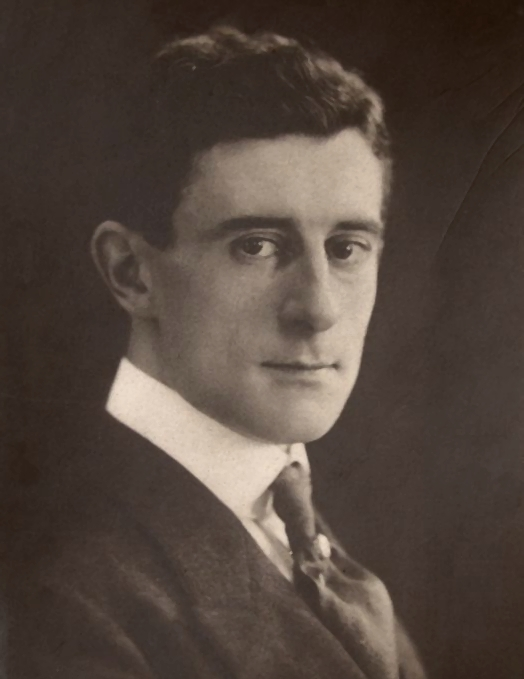
Maurice Ravel

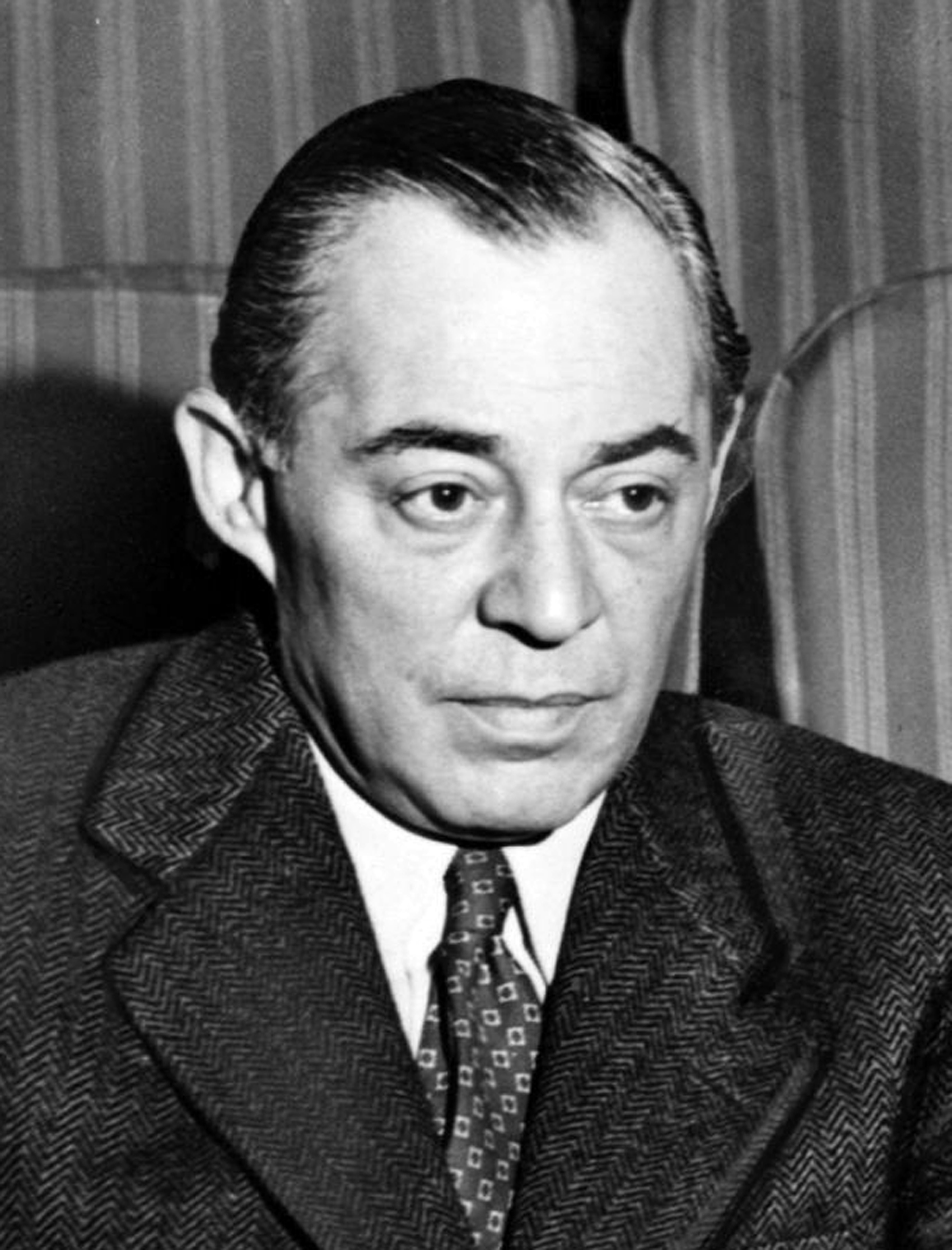
Richard Rodgers

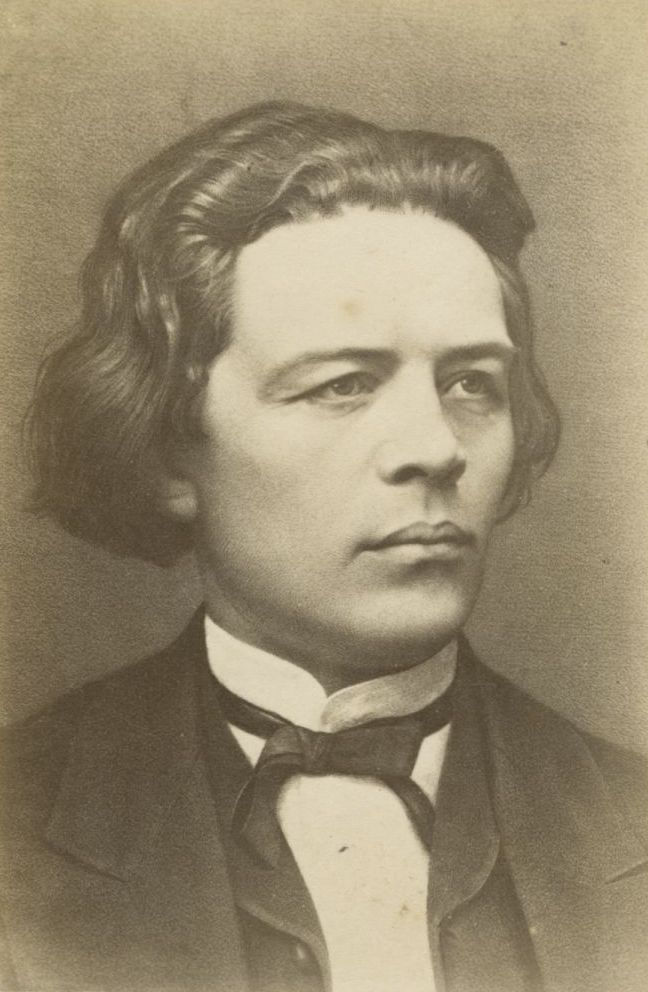
Anton Rubinstein

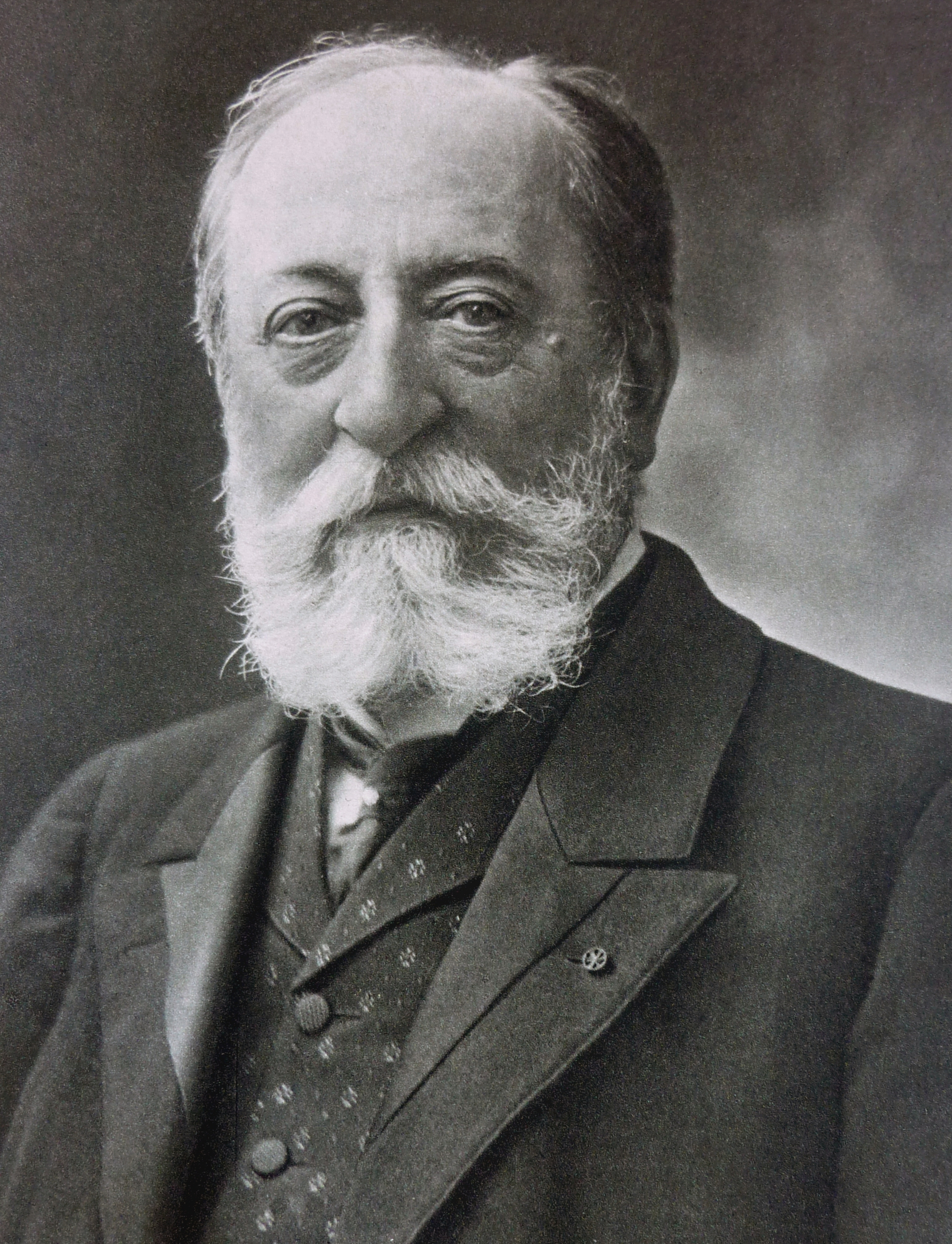
Camille Saint-Saëns

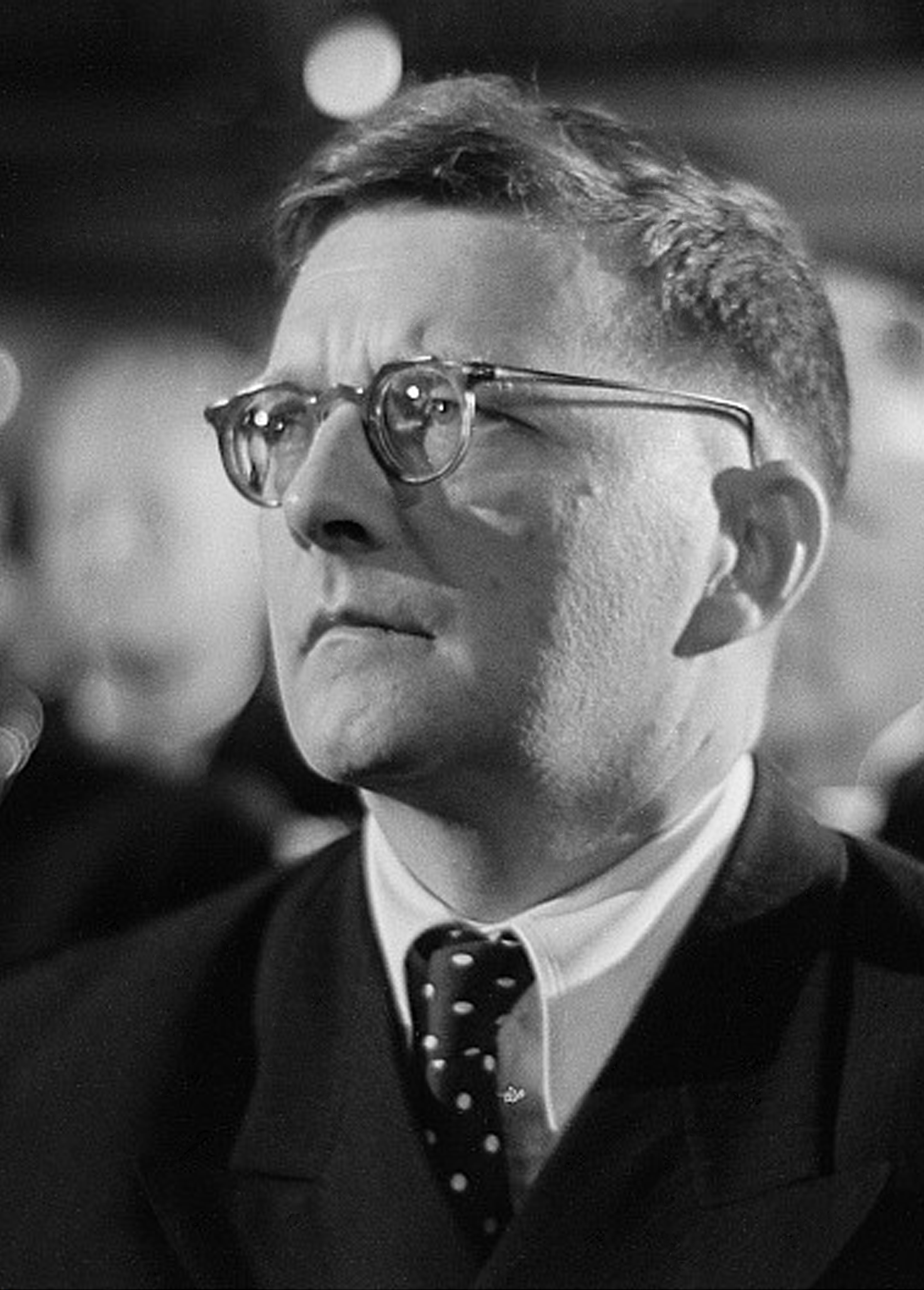
Dmitri Shostakovich

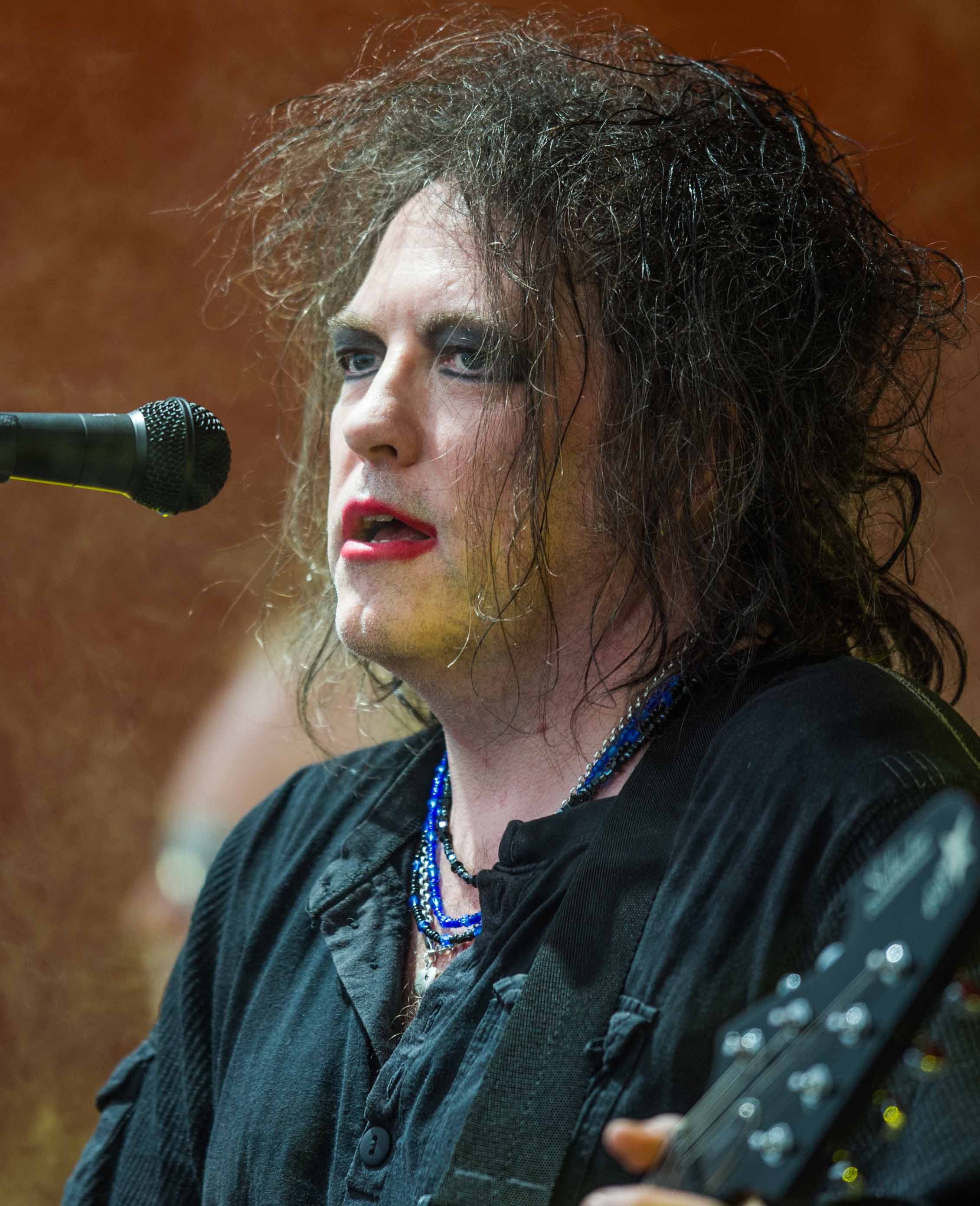
Robert Smith

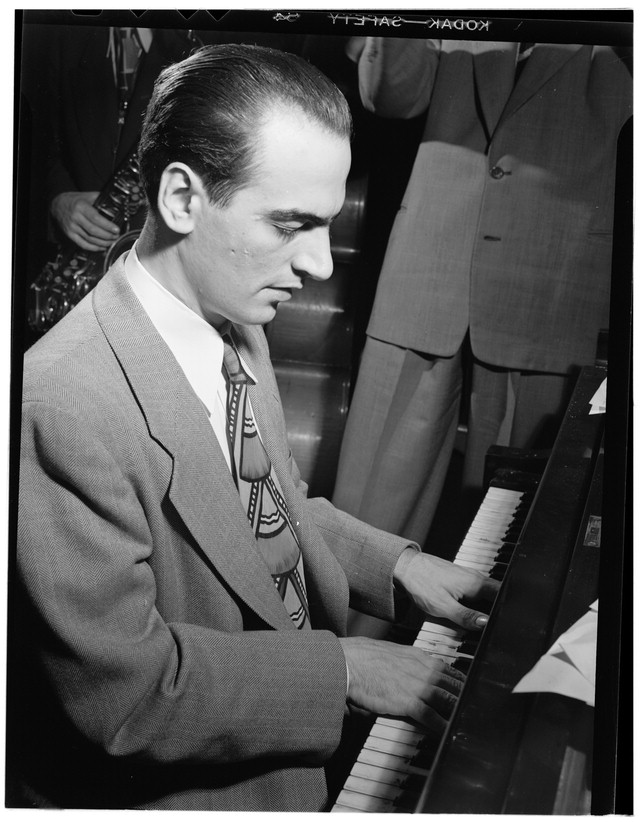
Lennie Tristano

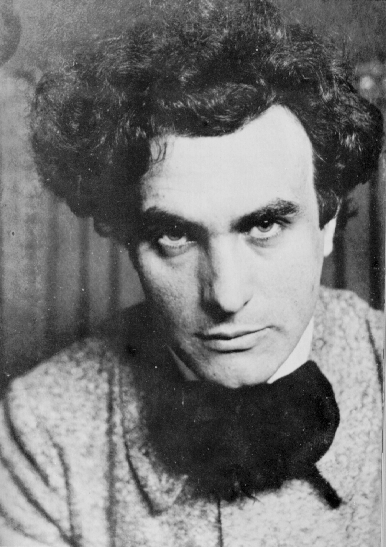
Edgard Varèse

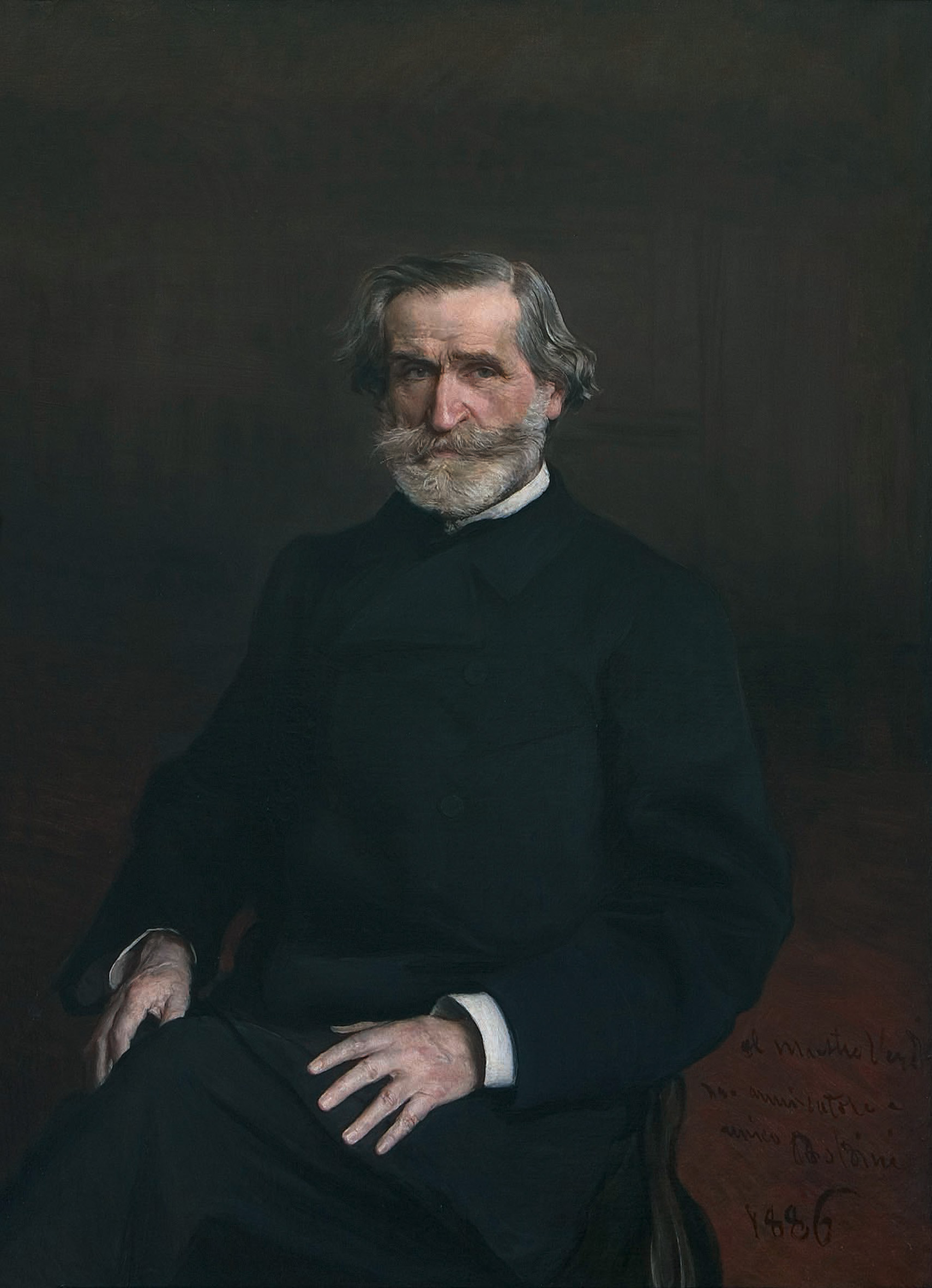
Giuseppe Verdi

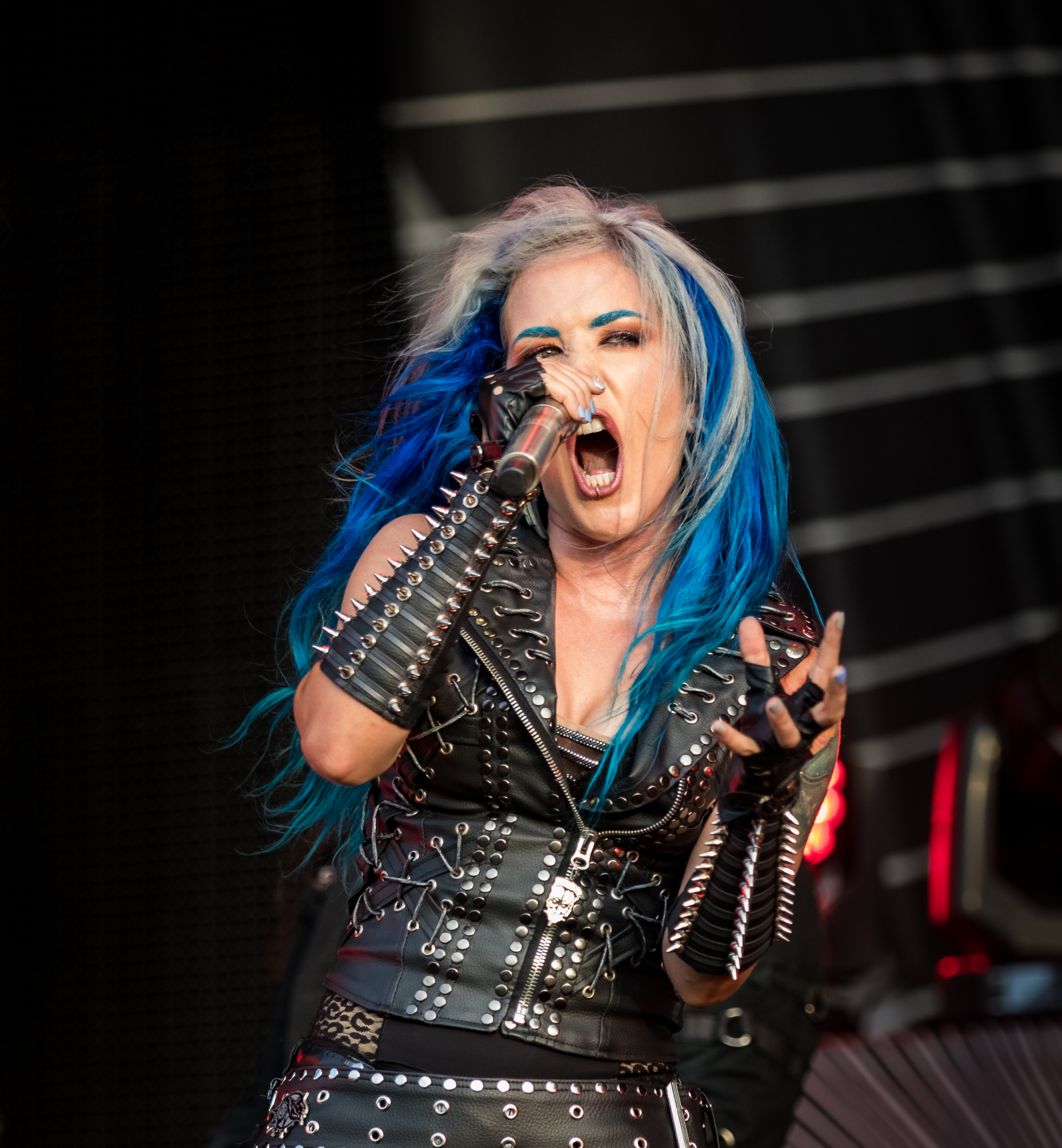
Alissa White-Gluz

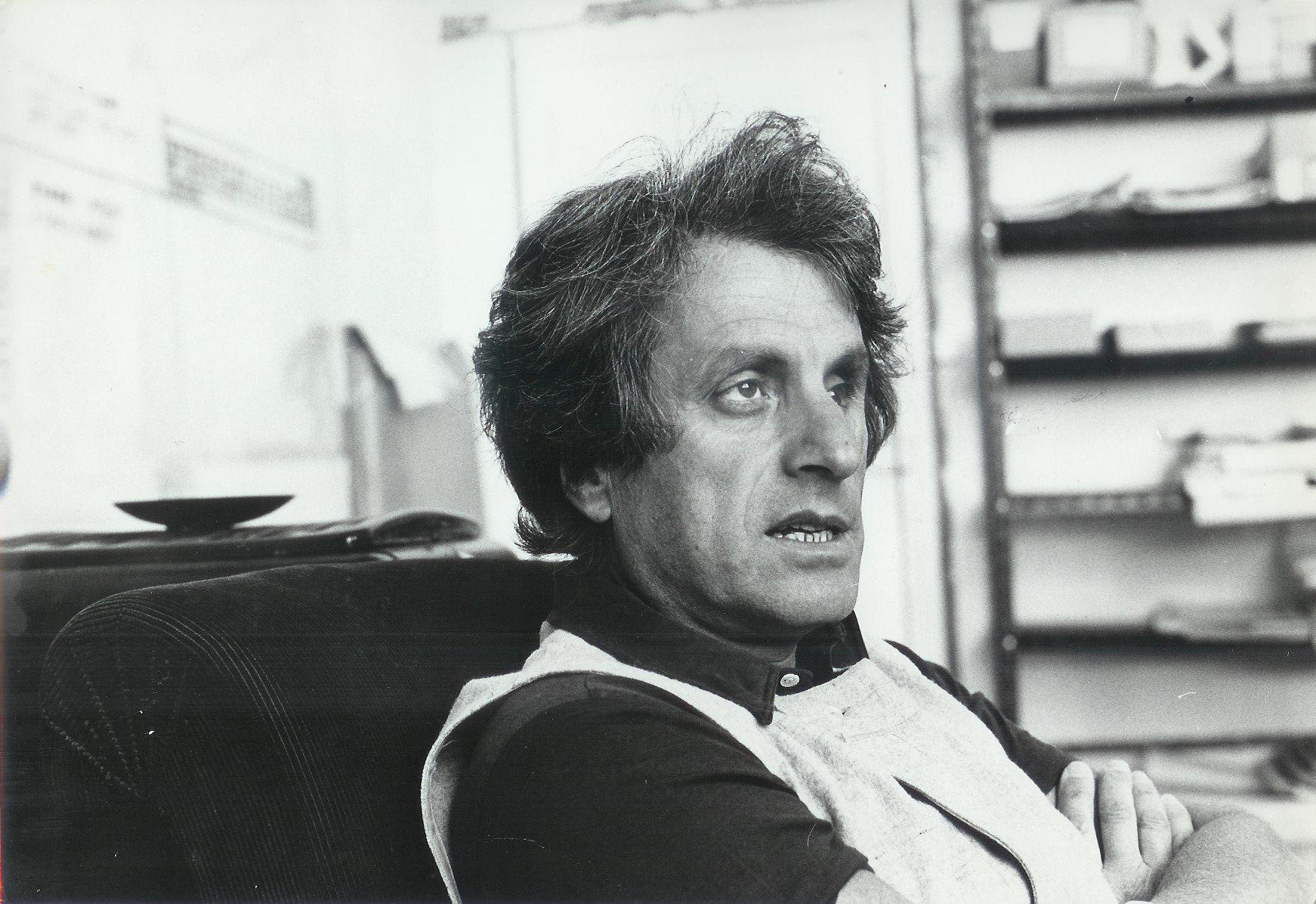
Iannis Xenakis

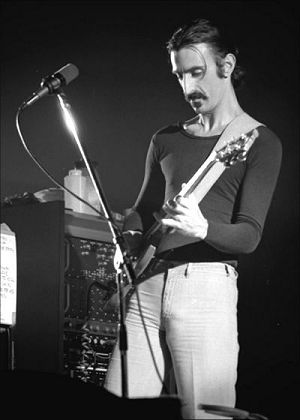
Frank Zappa

== A ==
- Larry Adler (1914–2001): American harmonica player.
- Mikael Åkerfeldt (1974–): Swedish musician, prominently known as the lead vocalist, guitarist, and primary songwriter of progressive death metal band Opeth.
- Javed Akhtar (1945–): Indian lyricist, poet and scriptwriter.
- Steve Albini (1962–2024): American singer, songwriter, guitarist, audio engineer, and music journalist. He was a member of Big Black, Rapeman, Flour and Shellac.
- Phil Anselmo (1968–): American musician and lead singer for the bands Pantera, Down, and Superjoint Ritual.
- Eric Avery (1965–): American musician and the bass player for the rock band Jane's Addiction.

== B ==
- Roy Bailey (1935–2018): British socialist folk singer.
- Brian Baker (1965–): American guitarist and bassist for punk bands such as Bad Religion, Minor Threat, Dag Nasty, Samhain, Junkyard, The Meatmen and Government Issue.
- Andy Biersack (1990-): American singer and lead vocalist for American rock band Black Veil Brides
- Jack Black (1969–): American actor, comedian, musician and producer.
- Georges Bizet (1838–1875): French composer. His final work, the opera Carmen, became one of the most popular and frequently performed works in the entire opera repertory.
- Björk (1965–): Icelandic singer-songwriter, producer, fashion model, and actress.
- Wes Borland (1975-): American guitarist and backing vocalist of Limp Bizkit.
- Paul Brady (1947–): Irish singer-songwriter and musician.
- Johannes Brahms (1833–1897) German composer, virtuoso pianist, and conductor of the mid-Romantic period.
- Jacques Brel (1929–1978): Belgian singer-songwriter.
- Isaac Brock (1975–): American singer, guitarist, banjoist, and songwriter for the indie rock band Modest Mouse.
- Chico Buarque (1941–): Brazilian singer, composer, poet and writer, one of the most famous of MPB.
- Peter Buck (1956–): Lead guitarist and member of American rock band R.E.M.
- Geoffrey Burgon (1941–2010): British composer notable for his television and film themes.
- Mike Burkett (1967–): (a.k.a. Fat Mike) American bassist and vocalist for the punk rock band NOFX. Many of their lyrics include atheist views.
- Henry Burstow (1826–1916): English shoemaker, singer and bellringer from Horsham, Sussex, best known for his vast repertoire of songs, many of which were collected in the folksong revival of the late 19th and early 20th centuries.
- Ferruccio Busoni (1866–1924): Italian composer, pianist, teacher of piano and composition, and conductor.

== C ==
- Dan "Soupy" Campbell (1986-): American pop-punk musician, lead singer of The Wonder Years.
- Vic Chesnutt (1964–2009): American singer-songwriter.
- Eddie Collins (1981–): (a.k.a. Greydon Square) African-American hip hop artist.
- Chris Corner (1974–): English musician, co-founder and former lead singer of 90s trip-hop group Sneaker Pimps. Now performing as IAMX.
- Wayne Coyne (1961–): American rock musician, lead singer of The Flaming Lips.
- Jonny Craig (1986–): Post-hardcore singer-songwriter, poet, lead vocalist for Emarosa and co-leader for Isles & Glaciers.
- Cronos (1963-2026): English musician, co-founder, vocalist and bassist of the metal band Venom.

== D ==
- Brann Dailor (1975–): Drummer, vocalist and songwriter for American heavy metal band Mastodon.
- Kim Deal (1961–): American singer, songwriter and musician, best known as the bassist and backup vocalist of the alternative rock band the Pixies, and the lead vocalist and rhythm guitarist for The Breeders.
- Frederick Delius CH (1862–1934): Noted English composer.
- G. Devarajan (1927-2006): Noted Indian (Malayalam) film and non-film music director, made numerous popular songs.
- King Diamond (1956–): Danish heavy metal singer.
- Ian "Dicko" Dickson (1963–): English-born music industry and television personality in Australia, best known as a judge on the television shows Australian Idol and The Next Great American Band.
- Ani DiFranco (1970–): Singer, guitarist, and songwriter.
- Marina Diamandis (1985–): British singer-songwriter

== E ==
- Electroboy (1974–): Swiss musician and model.
- Brian Eno (1948–): English electronic musician, music theorist and record producer, known as the father of modern ambient music.

== F ==
- Fenriz (1971–): Norwegian drummer and lyricist for the two-piece black metal band Darkthrone.
- Wil Francis (1982–): American rock musician and poet, lead singer of the post-hardcore band Aiden and the electronic rock project William Control

== G ==
- Madonna Wayne Gacy, (1964–): Long time keyboardist of the band Marilyn Manson.
- Bob Geldof KBE, (1951–): Irish singer-songwriter, organized the Live Aid and Live 8 charity concerts.
- Aviv Geffen (1973–): Israeli rock musician, singer, songwriter, producer, keyboardist, and guitarist.
- Ian Gillan (1945−): lead singer and lyricist for the rock band Deep Purple.
- David Gilmour CBE (1946–): English guitarist, songwriter and vocalist of Pink Floyd.
- Dave Godin (1936–2004): English champion of African-American music who coined the term 'Northern soul'.
- Angela Gossow (1974–): German vocalist, best known as the former lead vocalist for the Swedish melodic death metal band Arch Enemy.
- Greg Graffin (1964–): Lead singer of the punk rock band Bad Religion. Received his zoology PhD with the thesis Monism, Atheism and the Naturalist Worldview: Perspectives from Evolutionary Biology.
- Percy Grainger, (1882–1961): Australian-born composer and pianist.
- David Gray (1968–): English Grammy Award-winning singer-songwriter who came to prominence with his multi-platinum selling album White Ladder.
- Barney Greenway (1969–): British extreme metal vocalist, who has been a member of Napalm Death, Extreme Noise Terror, and Benediction.
- Gom Jabbar (1978–): eclectic, humorous, outspokenly humanist Bulgarian-American singer-songwriter.

== H ==
- Kathleen Hanna (1968–): Lead singer of Le Tigre and Bikini Kill.
- Jeff Hanneman (1964–2013): American guitarist, a founding member of the thrash metal band Slayer.
- Roy Harper (1941–): English rock / folk singer-songwriter and guitarist, known for his longtime associations with Jimmy Page and Robert Plant and for his guest lead vocals on Pink Floyd's song "Have a Cigar".
- Angel Haze (1991–) American rapper and singer
- Matty Healy (1989-): English singer-songwriter, lead singer of The 1975
- Paul Heaton (1962–): English singer-songwriter, leading member of The Housemartins and The Beautiful South.
- Anthony Heilbut (1940–): American record producer of gospel music and writer, a Grammy Award winner and noted for his biography of Thomas Mann.
- Gary Holt (1964–): American guitarist, main songwriter, and the bandleader of the thrash metal band Exodus, from 2011 to 2019 guitarist of the thrash metal band Slayer.
- Chris Holmes (1958–): heavy metal guitarist, best known as founding member of WASP.
- Tuomas Holopainen (musician) (1976 -): Finnish musician and composer, founder, and keyboard player of the symphonic metal band Nightwish.
- George Hrab (1971–): American rock & funk musician & podcaster.

== J ==
- Leoš Janáček (1854–1928): Czech composer, musical theorist, folklorist, publicist and teacher. He is considered to be one of the most important Czech composers, along with Antonín Dvořák and Bedřich Smetana .
- Floor Jansen (1981-): Lead Singer of Finnish symphonic metal band Nightwish
- Steve Jansen (1959–): English drummer, percussionist, musician, composer, and founding member of new wave band Japan.
- Billy Joel (1949–): American pianist, singer-songwriter and composer.
- Heri Joensen (1973–): Faroese musician, lead singer of the metal band Týr.
- Jung Wooyoung (1999–): Singer and dancer, member of Korean boy band Ateez.

== K ==
- Alex Kapranos (1972–): Lead singer of Scottish band Franz Ferdinand.
- Howard Kaylan (1947–): American rock and roll musician, best known as a founding member and lead singer of the 1960s band The Turtles, and as "Eddie" in the 1970s rock band Flo & Eddie.
- Paul Kelly (1955–): Australian rock music singer-songwriter, guitarist and harmonica player.
- Aram Khachaturian (1903–1978): Soviet Armenian composer.
- Kerry King (1964–): American guitarist, best known as one of the founding members of the thrash metal band Slayer.
- Seun Kuti (1983–): Nigerian Afrobeat musician.
- Linton Kwesi Johnson (1952–): British-based dub poet.

== L ==
- Todd La Torre (1974–): American lead singer for the progressive metal band Queensrÿche.
- Hugh Laurie (1959–): English actor, director, singer, musician, comedian and author.
- Simon Le Bon (1958–): English lead singer and lyricist of the band Duran Duran and its offshoot, Arcadia.
- Geddy Lee (1953–): Canadian singer, bassist and keyboardist of the progressive rock band Rush.
- Tom Lehrer (1928–2025): American singer-songwriter, satirist, pianist, and mathematician.
- György Ligeti (1923–2006): Composer of contemporary classical music.
- Till Lindemann (1963–): Lead singer of the German industrial metal band Rammstein.
- Dave Lombardo (1965–): Cuban-American drummer. Best known as a founding member of Slayer.
- John Lydon (1956–): British singer-songwriter and television presenter. Lead singer of the punk rock band Sex Pistols and post-punk band Public Image Ltd.

== M ==
- Shirley Manson (1966–): Lead singer of the British-American alternative rock band, Garbage.
- George Marshall-Hall (1862–1915): English-born Australian composer, conductor and professor of music.
- Nick Mason (1944–): English drummer for Pink Floyd.
- Sir Peter Maxwell Davies CBE (1934–2016): English composer and conductor; Master of the Queen's Music.
- Andy McKee (1979–): American composer and guitarist.
- George Melly (1926–2007): English jazz and blues singer, critic, writer and lecturer.
- James Mercer (1970–): American singer-songwriter, guitarist, and musician, best known as the founder, vocalist, lead singer-songwriter, and sole remaining original member of the indie rock group The Shins.
- Tim Minchin (1975–): British-Australian comedian, actor, and musician. Many of his songs and beat poems involve Tim's thoughts on his own atheism and organised religion.
- Edvard Mirzoyan (1921-2012), Armenian composer. Self-described atheist.
- Vinicius de Moraes (1913–1980): Brazilian composer and poet, best known as one of the first songwriters of bossa nova.

== N ==
- Simon Napier-Bell (1939–): English music producer, songwriter, journalist and author, best known as manager of (among others) The Yardbirds, Marc Bolan, T. Rex and Wham!.
- Necrobutcher (1968–): Norwegian bassist and founder of the black metal band Mayhem.
- Randy Newman (1943–): American singer-songwriter, who is known for his distinctive voice, mordant (and often satirical) pop songs and for film scores.
- Gary Numan (1958–): English new wave, synthpop and industrial rock musician.
- Alice Nutter (1962–): British singer and percussionist for Chumbawamba.
- Meshell Ndegeocello (1968–): American musician known for influencing the Neo soul movement.

== P ==
- Charlie Parker (1920–1955): American jazz saxophonist and composer. He is widely considered one of the most influential jazz musicians of his time.
- Richard Patrick (1968–): American singer, songwriter for the band Filter.
- Andy Partridge (1953–): English singer, songwriter, and guitarist for the pop/new wave band XTC.
- Porta (1988–): Spanish rapper.

== R ==
- Ronnie Radke (1983–): vocalist of American rock band Falling In Reverse.
- Maurice Ravel (1875–1937): French composer.
- Jim Reid (1961–): Scottish singer, songwriter and vocalist of the alternative rock band The Jesus and Mary Chain.
- Marc Riley (1961–): British musician, alternative rock critic and radio DJ.
- Nikolai Rimsky-Korsakov (1844–1908): Russian Nationalist composer, member of "The Five", best known for the symphonic suite Scheherazade.
- Ed Robertson (1970–): Canadian guitarist and lead singer of the Barenaked Ladies.
- Richard Rodgers (1902–1979): American composer of the music for more than 900 songs and 40 Broadway musicals, best known for his songwriting partnerships with the lyricists Lorenz Hart and Oscar Hammerstein II.
- Henry Rollins (1961–): American musician. Lead singer of Black Flag.
- Linda Ronstadt: singer and author of Simple Dreams: a Musical Memoir (2013).
- Ned Rorem (1923–2022): American composer.
- Harold Rubin, (1932–2020) South African visual artist, musician
- Anton Rubinstein: Russian pianist, composer and conductor who became a pivotal figure in Russian culture when he founded the Saint Petersburg Conservatory.
- RM (1994–): South Korean rapper, songwriter, and record producer. Member of South Korean boy band BTS.

== S ==
- Camille Saint-Saëns (1835–1921): French composer, organist, conductor, and pianist of the Romantic era.
- Eric Sams (1926–2004): British musicologist and Shakespeare scholar.
- Fazıl Say (1970–): Turkish pianist and composer.
- Scarlxrd (1994–): English rapper and former YouTuber.
- Shelley Segal (1987–): Australian singer-songwriter known for her 2011 album, An Atheist Album
- Anton Seidl (1850–1898): Hungarian conductor.
- Captain Sensible (1955–): singer, songwriter, musician and co-founded the punk rock band The Damned.
- Dmitri Shostakovich (1906–1975): Russian composer and pianist, considered to be one of the most influential composers of the 20th century.
- Labi Siffre (1945–): British singer, songwriter, musician and poet.
- Robert Smith (1959–): British musician, songwriter, singer and guitarist of the band The Cure.
- Donita Sparks (1963–): American vocalist, guitarist and song-writer with her band Donita Sparks and the Stellar Moments and co-founder of grunge band L7.
- Britney Spears (1981–): singer and dancer; former teen pop idol.
- Wayne Static (1965–2014): frontman for industrial metal band Static-X.
- Jonathan Steingard (1983–): Canadian vocalist, former lead singer of Hawk Nelson.
- Earl Sweatshirt (1994–): American rapper and producer.
- Oliver Sykes (1986–): vocalist of British rock band Bring Me the Horizon.

== T ==
- Corey Taylor (1974–): American musician, Lead singer of Slipknot and Stone Sour.
- Hans Teeuwen (1967–) Dutch comedian and singer.
- Richard Thomas (1964–): British musician, writer, and comedy actor, best known for composing and scoring the award-winning Jerry Springer: The Opera.
- Tracey Thorn (1962–): English pop singer and songwriter, best known as one half of the duo Everything but the Girl.
- Sir Michael Tippett OM (1905–1998): English composer, regarded as one of the greatest of the 20th century.
- Lennie Tristano (1919–1978): American jazz pianist, composer, arranger, and teacher of jazz improvisation.
- Frank Turner (1981–): English folk/punk singer-songwriter.
- Tyler, The Creator (1991–): American rapper, singer, songwriter, record producer, music video director, actor, comedian, and fashion designer.

== U ==
- Brendon Urie (1987–): American singer, songwriter, and musician, lead vocalist of Panic! at the Disco.

== V ==
- Ville Valo (1976–): Finnish singer, songwriter and musician.
- Edgard Varèse (1883–1965): Franco-American composer and pioneer of electroacoustic music.
- Eddie Vedder (1964–): lead singer and lyricist of the band Pearl Jam.
- Giuseppe Verdi (1813–1901): Italian composer.
- Caetano Veloso (1942–): Brazilian singer-songwriter, musician. Best known for his participation in the tropicalia movement.

== W ==
- Roger Waters (1943–): English rock musician; singer, bassist, guitarist, songwriter and composer, best known for his career with Pink Floyd.
- Ian Watkins (Lostprophets singer) (1977-2025): Former lead singer of Welsh Rock Band Lostprophets and convicted sex offender.
- Pete Wentz (1979–): American pop punk musician; singer, bassist and principle lyricist of Fall Out Boy.
- Pete Wernick (1946–): American bluegrass banjo player and songwriter.
- Jerry Wexler (1917–2008): American music journalist and producer, regarded as one of the major record industry players behind music from the 1950s through the 1980s, coiner of the term rhythm and blues.
- Mark White (1961–): Bassist of the American alternative rock band Spin Doctors.
- Alissa White-Gluz (1985–): Canadian vocalist; lead vocalist of the Swedish melodic death metal band Arch Enemy.
- Earl Wild (1915–2010): American classical pianist, considered a leading virtuoso of his generation.
- Mike IX Williams (1968-): American vocalist and lead singer of New Orleans based sludge metal bands Eyehategod and Outlaw Order.
- Steven Wilson (1967–): English musician and record producer, most associated with the progressive rock genre.

== X ==
- Iannis Xenakis (1922–2001): Greek composer, music theorist, and architect-engineer. He pioneered the use of mathematical models in music such as applications of set theory, stochastic processes and game theory and was also an important influence on the development of electronic music.

== Z ==
- Frank Zappa (1940–1993): American composer, singer-songwriter, electric guitarist, record producer, and film director.
- Zucchero (1955–): Italian singer-songwriter and multi-instrumentalist.
