= CASH Music =

US non-profit organization

- Founded: November 25, 2008
- Founder: Kristin Hersh, Donita Sparks, Jesse von Doom
- Purpose: Sustainable independent music
- Location: Portland, Oregon, United States
- Region served: Worldwide
- Method: Open source, education
- Key people: Jesse von Doom, Maggie Vail (co-executive directors)
- Website: cashmusic.net

CASH Music (Coalition of Artists and Stakeholders) was a non-profit organization based out of Portland, Oregon, founded by Kristin Hersh of Throwing Muses, Donita Sparks of L7, and Jesse von Doom. The organization was run by executive director Maggie Vail after Jesse von Doom resigned to focus on other matters. CASH Music took an open source approach to music production and distribution, and worked directly with musicians and labels to help design the tools they built.

== History ==
CASH Music evolved from a discussion about the sustainability of the music industry between musicians Kristin Hersh, Donita Sparks, and their managers Billy O'Connell and Bob Fagan. Von Doom became involved shortly thereafter. Meanwhile, Portland-based record label Kill Rock Stars had reached out to von Doom, who operated a small web development studio, Dutchmoney, to build a new label website. Von Doom went "above and beyond" and created promotional tools that allowed then KRS VP Vail to "keep tabs on which music writers logged into the site and how many times they listened to the tunes". Vail, who was impressed with the tools and supported the CASH Music's mandate joined its board of directors in 2007. She became its co-executive director, alongside von Doom, in 2011.

== Platform and Other Code ==
The CASH Music platform was a free collection of tools for artists and labels to sell, share, and promote music directly to their fans. It was entirely open source, with all code available for viewing or forking at GitHub.

The platform enabled digital purchases, download code generation and redemption, email collection, secure downloads, tour dates, member areas, and social feeds.

While many of the platform's features operated independently, it was also designed to be compatible with third-party resources, such as MailChimp, Google Drive, and PayPal through APIs. The idea was to "integrate seamlessly with as many relevant Web services as possible".

Artists who used the CASH Music platform include Brendan Benson, Calexico, Deerhoof, Explosions in the Sky, 50 Foot Wave, Health., Iron & Wine, Kina Grannis, Learning Music, Lushlife, No Age, Portugal. The Man, The Raincoats, Ray LaMontagne, The Swell Season, The Thermals, Xiu Xiu, Zoë Keating, Zola Jesus.

Participating labels include Mom + Pop Music, FatCat Records, Kill Rock Stars, Nat Geo Music, Sacred Bones Records, Saddle Creek Records, Sub Pop, and Temporary Residence Limited.

=== cashmusic.js ===
cashmusic.js was a lightweight JavaScript library that handled CASH Music embeds available through the platform, provides video lightboxing compatible with YouTube and Vimeo, and simple audio players.

The library was distributed under a simplified BSD license, which imposed nominal restrictions on its redistribution. The library was designed to not interfere with jQuery or similar libraries, and relied on no external dependencies besides SoundManager 2 for audio playback.

== Education ==
Central to CASH Music's mandate was a focus on learning. They were currently developing an educational curriculum geared towards empowering artists by equipping them with both resources and technical skills. The non-profit had hosted two summits in Portland, OR, in summer 2013, and hosted its next summit in Los Angeles in November 2013.

== I.R.S. Scrutiny and 501(c)3 Status ==
Von Doom sought 501(c)(3) status for CASH Music in February 2009, only to have his application denied by the IRS in June 2012. His rejection letter was signed by Lois Lerner, the embattled former Director of the IRS Exempt Organizations division, who was placed on administrative leave after it was revealed that the IRS had targeted political groups applying for tax-exempt status based on keywords contained in their names and suspected political allegations. While initial speculation pointed to Super PACs being targeted based on conservative keywords, a New York Times article that ran on June 5, 2013, revealed that IRS scrutiny extended beyond the political. The term open source is a keyword that is now known to have flagged CASH Music for further investigation, as "the IRS feared that such groups were really moneymaking enterprises".

Despite being denied 501(c)(3) status, CASH Music continued to operate as a non-profit on the state level (Oregon) and continued to seek federal non-profit status.

== Board ==
Members:

- Dave Allen, founder and bassist for Gang of Four and Shriekback, op-ed columnist for The Guardian
- Anthony Batt, Buzznet and Spin Media founder, vice-president at WeMo Labs
- Jonathan Coulton, musician
- Tishaun Dawson, artist, graphic designer, and founder of Battalion Armour
- Pascal Finette, director, Office of the Chair at Mozilla Corporation
- Jake Friedman, co-founder of Lovepump United Records and partner at We Are Free Management
- Leslie Hawthorn, community manager at Elasticsearch, formerly the open source program manager at Google Inc.
- Kristin Hersh, guitarist, founder/songwriter of Throwing Muses and 50 Foot Wave
- Dick Huey, consultant at SoundExchange, committee member at A2IM,
- Zoë Keating, musician
- Molly Neuman, Senior Director of Label and Publishing Licensing at Rhapsody and musician with Bratmobile, The Frumpies, and The PeeChees
- Eric Steuer, creative director at Creative Commons and contributor at Wired Magazine
- Ben Swanson, co-founder of Secretly Canadian and partner at Dead Oceans, Jagjaguwar, and Fort William Artist Management
- Tobi Vail, musician with Bikini Kill, The Frumpies, The Old Haunts, and Spider and the Webs, zinester and feminist critic
- Andrew Weissman,
- Emily White, co-founder of Readymade Records and Whitesmith Entertainment

Former members:

- George Howard, COO at Norton, LLC
- Nick Palmacci, General Manager at Fenway Recordings
- Clay Rockefeller, founder of The Steel Yard

== Closure ==
The organization announced their shutting down in 2020 after 12 years of activity. On June 25th 2020, they wrote on Twitter "It is with a heavy heart that we share the news that CASH Music is shutting down."

The statement read: "There will be a longer post-mortem later from the org and likely a few of us as individuals. We are proud of what we were able to accomplish, frustrated by some of the things we weren’t, but thankful for all of you. Our community is so special."

They officially ceased all operations on July 10th 2020.

== See also ==
- Open source
- Creative Commons
