= Transmiticate =

Studio album by Donita Sparks and The Stellar Moments
- Released: February 19, 2008
- Recorded: 2004–2008
- Genre: Alternative rock
- Length: 35:20
- Label: SparksFly Records
- Producer: Ethan Allen, Donita Sparks

Professional ratings
Review scores
Source	Rating
Allmusic	link

Transmiticate is the first album by the Los Angeles rock musician Donita Sparks' solo project Donita Sparks and The Stellar Moments, also featuring the former guitarist, singer and songwriter of punk rock band L7.

== Track listing ==
All songs written by Donita Sparks

1. "Fly Feather Fly" – 4:58
2. "Dare Dare" – 2:33
3. "Infancy of a Disaster" – 3:17
4. "Headcheck" – 3:06
5. "My Skin's Too Thin" – 2:45
6. "Curtains for Cathy" – 3:03
7. "Creampuff" – 3:58
8. "He's Got the Honey" – 3:11
9. "Need to Numb" – 2:26
10. "Take a Few Steps" – 3:58
11. "Into the Hi-Fi" – 2:13

== Personnel ==
- Donita Sparks – vocals, guitars, bass
- Alan Santalesa – guitars
- Demetra Plakas – drums, percussion
- Jesika von Rabbit – additional vocals on 1
- Dat Ngo – bass
- Ethan Allen – guitars, keyboards, synthesizer
- Kirk Canning – bass on 7
- Jason Shapiro – guitars 8
