= Donita Sparks and the Stellar Moments =

- Origin: Los Angeles, California, U.S.
- Years active: 2007–2012
- Label: SparksFly Records
- Past members: Donita Sparks; Alan Santalesa; Dat Ngo; Dee Plakas

Donita Sparks and the Stellar Moments was L7 co-founder Donita Sparks' solo project. The band also featured Alan Santalesa on guitar, Dat Ngo on bass, and former L7 drummer Demetra Plakas on drums.

Their album Transmiticate was released on February 19, 2008 through SparksFly Records and produced by Ethan Allen and Donita Sparks. NPR's Fresh Air gave the album favorable reviews and cited the group's roots in 1970s punk music. Ken Tucker, then editor at large for Entertainment Weekly, commented on the "fluid power" of Plakas's drum playing propelling the music and observed that lyrically "Sparks remains a feminist for whom romanticism doesn't mean sentimentality - it mean passion."

Nuvo commented on the general danceability of the album with individual songs described as having a "bombinating swing" or with "quirky vocal styling".

In October 2007, Donita Sparks and the Stellar Moments went on a national tour with The Donnas, where they performed work from their forthcoming album at over 30 venues.

Donita Sparks and the Stellar Moments played at South by Southwest in Austin, Texas in March 2008.

In an interview, former guitarist Alan Santalesa stated that the Stellar Moments are no more and that Dat Ngo joined him to form the Shiteland Ponies. Donita Sparks and the Stellar Moments were active from 2007 to 2012. As L7 reunited in 2014, Sparks and Plakas continue to create music together.
