= Learning Music =

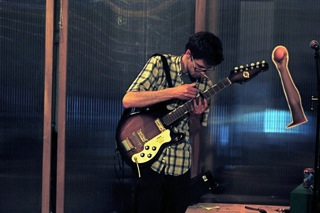
- John Wood performing at Machine Project in Echo Park, Los Angeles, California.

Background information
- Origin: Glassell Park, California, United States
- Genres: Neofolk; Electropop; Spoken word Experimental; Indie rock
- Years active: 2006–2011
- Labels: vosotros Community Pool Tapes
- Members: John Clement Wood
- Past members: Oscar Schedin, Mike G, Bram Inscore, Jason Golday, Drew Jorgensen, Gabe Noel, Lisa Tremain, Andrew Epstein, Lewis Keller, Cat Lamb, Charles DeCastro, Joe Tepperman, Sam Robles, Max Markowitz, Damon Zick, Corey Fogel, Noah Harmon, Scott Farr, Marcel Camargo, Devin McNulty, Davin Givhan, Douglas Pipes, Peter Slocum, Daphne Chen, Gus Seyffert, John Kirby, Beth Schenk, Matt Wrobel, Alex Silverman, Alex Noice, Aaron Arntz, Alex Lily, John Gillilan, Zach Harmon, Alice Linn, Keith Karman, Jeff Eliassen, Dave Devine, Jake Blanton, Scott Godfrey, John Michael Richardson, Michael Beltran, Jonathan Silberman, Larry Goldings
- Website: Learning Music Monthly

Learning Music was an experimental band and music collective based in Los Angeles, California.

Learning Music was founded in November 2006 by John Clement Wood (backing musician for The Black Keys, Sebastien Tellier, Inara George, Mike Andrews, Anni Rossi). Under the title Learning Music Monthly, the group released one original album per month for three years. The live band ranged from two to twenty performers at once, playing almost exclusively at smaller venues around Los Angeles. The band’s musical influences include Terry Riley, Talking Heads, Storm & Stress, and American folk music.

On December 20, 2009, Learning Music was featured on NPR's All Things Considered.

On March 21, 2010, Learning Music's monthly album series was profiled by the Associated Press.

On April 20, 2010, "Ovulation" by Learning Music was featured as KCRW's Today's Top Tune.

== Learning Music Monthly ==
Learning Music Monthly was a "subscription-based album-a-month series.” This project was started by John Clement Wood and the first twelve albums released were written and recorded in his home studio. These albums feature numerous guest artists. After the release of his twelfth production, Wood stopped recording and formed a live Learning Music band. One year after their production hiatus, Learning Music partnered with Los Angeles-based vosotros and resumed recording and releasing their monthly albums.

The monthly releases of Learning Music are available through their website: Learning Music Monthly. According to the Creative Commons website, Learning Music offered a “tiered subscription service” where subscribers "receive a brand new full-length album of original music every month." The entire LMM catalog is currently available for free streaming and download on their website. Subscribers were able to have physical CDs with artwork from a new artist each month mailed to their homes. All of Learning Music's work is released under a Creative Commons BY-NC-SA 3.0 license, which according to an interview with John Wood, “inspire[s] new creative opportunities”. Thus listeners are allowed to share and remix the music for non-commercial purposes.

Notable albums include a musical written by a robot, two collections of music videos (where the music was written to pre-made videos by various filmmakers), an album of 99 20-second songs using only samples of kitchen objects and voice, a Greek drama musical telling the story of the first ever Jeopardy! three-way tie, a synth-pop-dance interpretation of Guy Debord's Society of the Spectacle, an album of spoken word stories and experimentations, and a variety of other recordings utilizing various mixed genres and production techniques.

The 36th and final issue of Learning Music Monthly was released in April, 2011.

== Discography ==
=== Season 1 ===
- LMM 1.1 - Whales this November (November 2006)
- LMM 1.2 - De-December (December 2006)
- LMM 1.3 - Readers, Travel (January 2007)
- LMM 1.4 - The Songs of Clem Ten (February 2007)
- LMM 1.5 - No Fingers, Hands (March 2007)
- LMM 1.6 - Memorial (April 2007)
- LMM 1.7 - In My Living Room Thursday Night (May 2007)
- LMM 1.8 - Jason Golday's Burning Music (June 2007)
- LMM 1.9 - Songs For Singing (July 2007)
- LMM 1.10 - Readers, I Like To Read (August 2007)
- LMM 1.11 - September Still (September 2007)
- LMM 1.12 - Contagious (October 2007)

=== Season 2 ===
- LMM 2.1 - Allegro (March 2009)
- LMM 2.2 - Matchstick Monument (April 2009)
- LMM 2.3 - An End Like This (May 2009)
- LMM 2.4 - Geochemistry (June 2009)
- LMM 2.5 - You Can Take It In (July 2009)
- LMM 2.6 - Frequency Histograms for Predictor Variables (August 2009)
- LMM 2.7 - Friends Who Are (September 2009)
- LMM 2.8 - Famous: the Jonny Pride Story (October 2009)
- LMM 2.9 - Horizontal Household Ballads (November 2009)
- LMM 2.10 - (a telling of) The Greatest Event in Sports History (December 2009)
- LMM 2.11 - Fifteen Two Part Inventions for 2010 (January 2010)
- LMM 2.12 - The Biologic Imperative (February 2010)

=== Season 3 ===
- LMM 3.1 - Left Right (May 2010)
- LMM 3.2 - Neapolitan Shake (June 2010)
- LMM 3.3 - Learning Music with the Students at KIPP LA College Prep (July 2010)
- LMM 3.4 - Little Spookie (August 2010)
- LMM 3.5 - In The Lights (September 2010)
- LMM 3.6 - Face Fingers (feat. Nowcloud) (October 2010)
- LMM 3.7 - Untitled (November 2010)
- LMM 3.8 - LARGER (December 2010)
- LMM 3.9 - Congratulations (January 2011)
- LMM 3.10 - Base and the Superstructure presents: The $pectacle (February 2011)
- LMM 3.11 - Confessions Accounts Ruminations (March 2011)
- LMM 3.12 - Choreos Incorporated (April 2011)

=== Compilations ===
- The Greatest Hits So Far EP (vosotros, 2008)
- This May Also Be It (vosotros, 2009)
- It May Also Be This (vosotros, 2010)
- An End Like This (Free Music Archive, 2011)
