= Donita Sparks =

American singer and guitarist

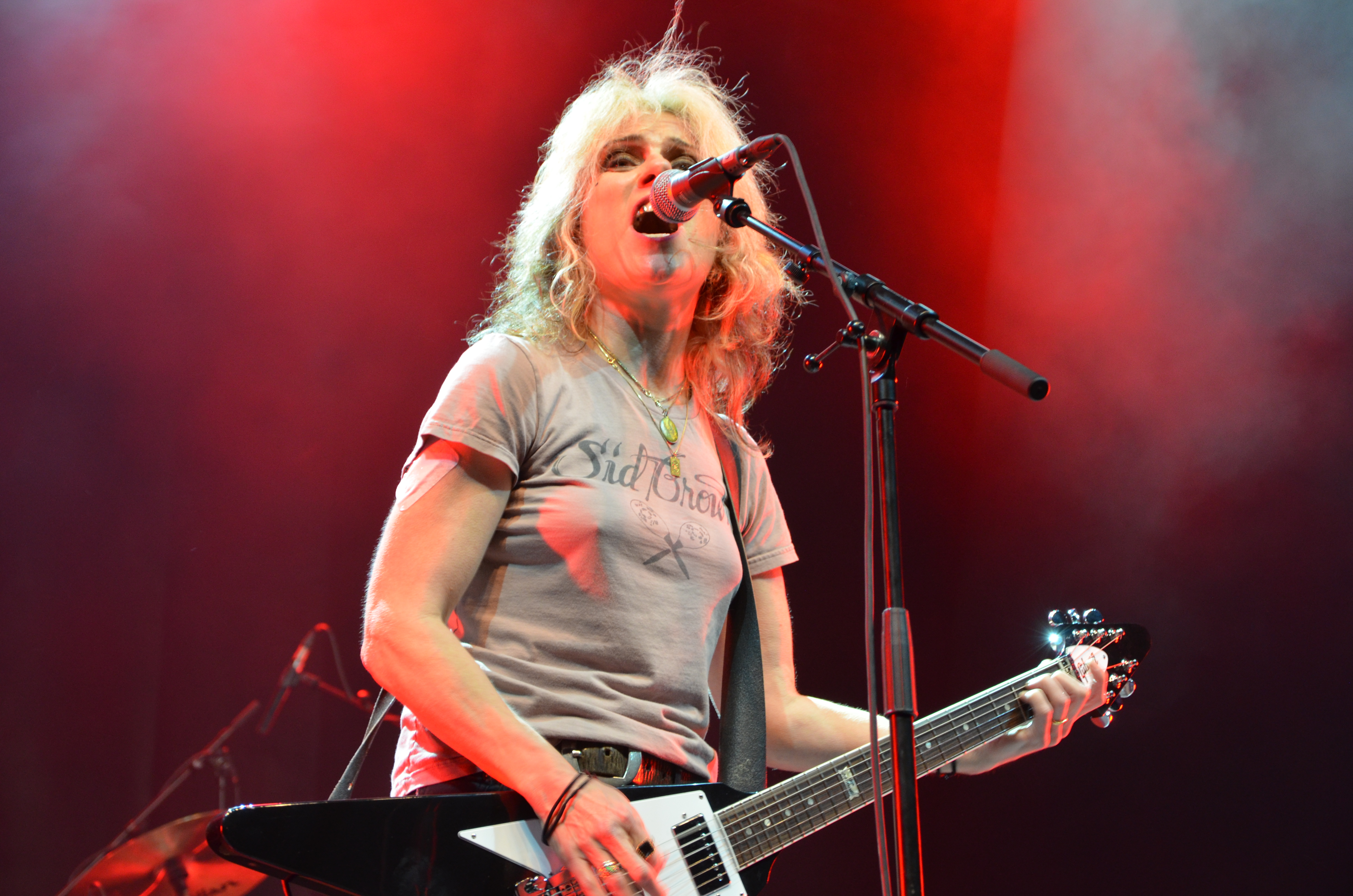
- Donita Sparks in 2015

Background information
- Born: April 8, 1963 (age 63); Chicago, Illinois, U.S.
- Genres: Alternative metal; grunge; alternative rock; punk rock; heavy metal
- Occupations: Singer; songwriter; musician
- Instruments: Vocals; guitar
- Years active: 1985–present
- Labels: Epitaph; Sub Pop; Slash; Man's Ruin; Wax Tadpole; CASH; Blackheart

Donita Sparks (born April 8, 1963) is an American singer, guitarist, and songwriter most notable for being the co-founder and lead singer of the band L7. Sparks also initiated, performed, and released original material with her solo project, the band Donita Sparks and the Stellar Moments.

== Early life ==
Sparks was born on April 8, 1963, in the Hyde Park neighborhood of Chicago, Illinois. One of several sisters, Sparks was raised in Oak Lawn, in a family that regularly participated in political actions. Sparks credits her father for cultivating her sense of rhythm at an early age and her mother with instilling an awareness of equal rights. During high school, Sparks used her older sister's ID to get into clubs, including Club 950 Lucky Number and Neo. Following her graduation from high school in 1981, she attended classes at the Community Film Workshop of Chicago. Sparks worked for a year as a foot messenger for a photo lab, delivering photos in downtown Chicago, prior to moving to Los Angeles at the age of 19.

== Career ==
Sparks met Suzi Gardner in 1984 and they formed the creative foundation of L7 by 1985. Sparks and Gardner had both worked at LA Weekly, although at separate times, and were active participants in the Art punk DIY scene in the Echo Park/Silver Lake area when they began writing music together. Sparks credited mutual friends at LA Weekly for connecting her to Gardner and stated that the publisher was a cultural hub of performance artists, writers, and musicians including Vaginal Davis and Jonathan Gold on staff at the time.

Recognized for subverting and transcending the expectations of performers in the late 80s and early 90s, L7 produced seven original studio albums between 1985 and 2019. In a 1993 article for Spin which featured L7 on the magazine's cover, Renée Crist described L7 as "four of the funniest, meanest, strongest, coolest, most pissed-off women I know" and as "wild, rambunctious, spontaneous" with a stage show that "is a wash of buddy love, crowd working, and acrobatics".

In 1994, Sparks appeared in the John Waters film Serial Mom as a musician and performer in the fictitious band "Camel Lips."

Sparks released her debut solo record Transmiticate as Donita Sparks and the Stellar Moments in February 2008. The Boston Globe, in a June 2008 review, described Sparks' performance as high energy with a commanding stage presence.

In 2008, Sparks and Kristin Hersh co-founded CASH Music (Coalition of Artists and Stakeholders) as a means to self release their own music; the non-profit organization has grown to offer marketing and publishing tools for musicians that are open source.

Sparks' music has been featured in the films Natural Born Killers, Brokeback Mountain, Perks of Being a Wildflower and in the video games Grand Theft Auto: San Andreas and Rock Band 2.

Sparks is also the drummer for the tribute band, Lou Man Group, a performance homage to Lou Reed and the Blue Man Group.

L7 reformed in 2014 and embarked on a reunion tour in 2015. The documentary L7: Pretend We're Dead, directed by Sarah Price, features original footage and interviews with Donita Sparks and was released November 2016. The film was nominated for a VO5 NME Award for Best Music Film.

Sparks continues to perform live shows with the original line up of L7 and co-wrote two new songs with Suzi Gardner: Dispatch from Mar-a-Lago, 2017 and I Came Back to Bitch, 2018 that were released as singles.

L7's latest full album Scatter the Rats was released on Blackheart Records on May 3, 2019. Sparks gave a number of interviews reflecting on the trajectory of the group and discussing the challenges and triumphs faced over the years by the band. The band resumed a six-week national tour starting on May 10, 2019.

Sparks guitar of choice is the deliberately angular Flying V which she described as looking like "something from the Jetsons".

In March 2019, Sparks appeared as part a panel discussion along with Henry Rollins, Marky Ramone, and John Lydon following a screening for the Epix docuseries Punk. While the conversation became heated between Lydon and Ramone, Sparks maintained her composure and humor, crediting both the Sex Pistols and the Ramones as sources of inspiration in her youth.

In November 2019, Sparks participated in a digital full life interview for the Women of Rock Oral History Project housed at the Sophia Smith Collection at Smith College. In the interview, Sparks discusses her early life and career with L7 as well as her experiences as a woman in the music industry.

Rolling Stone magazine announced that Sparks was hosting a new show called The Hi-Low Show With Donita Sparks that began streaming every Friday starting in April 2020. The weekly show has been structured to feature performances by Sparks and special musical guests.

== Philanthropy ==
Sparks and L7 formed Rock for Choice with the Feminist Majority Foundation in 1991, staging numerous concerts benefiting pro-choice organizations featuring some of the biggest bands in the industry including Nirvana and Hole.

== Notable stage moments ==
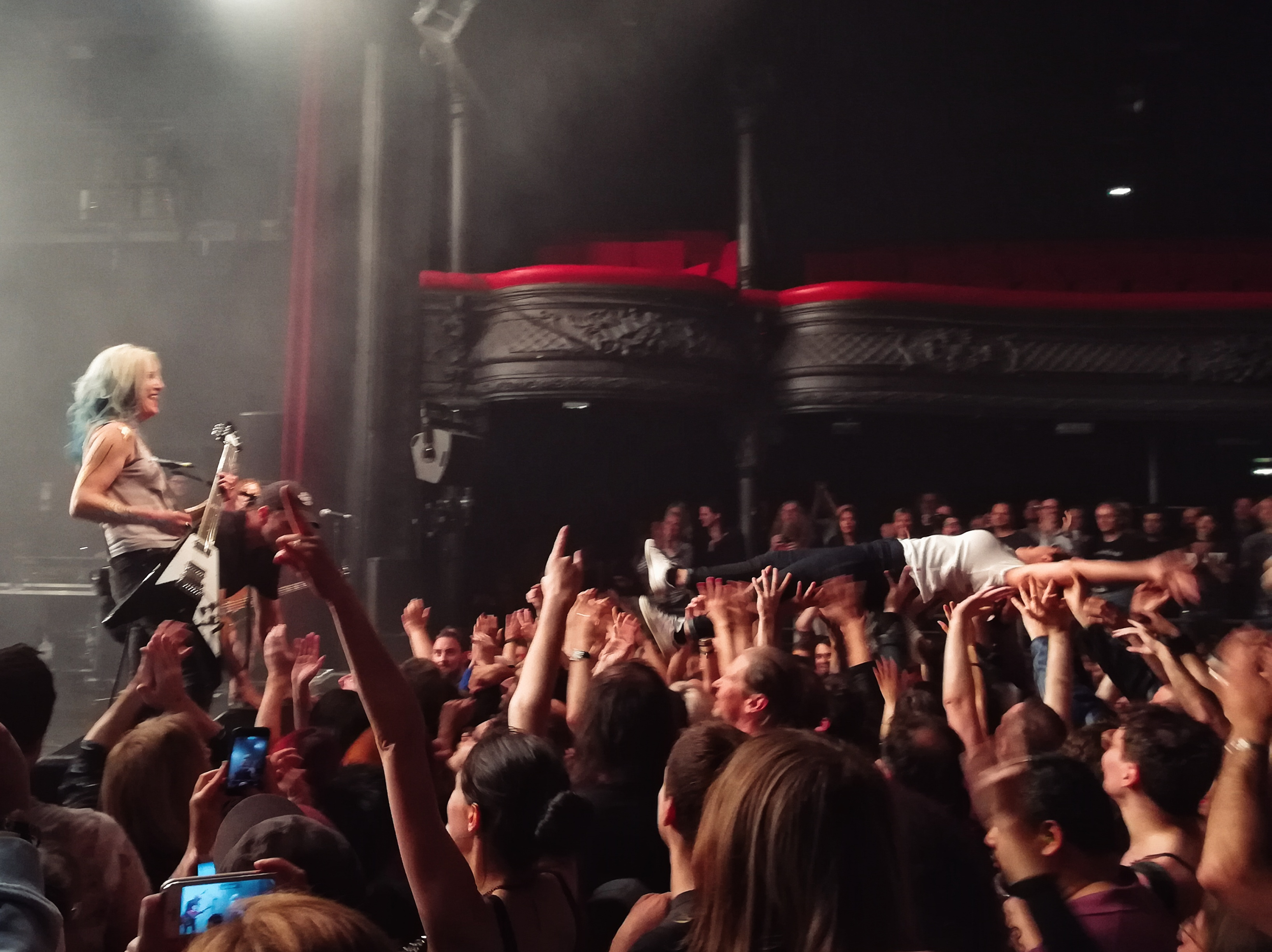
Sparks onstage with the reformed L7 in 2018

While L7 was performing at the Reading Festival in 1992, their loudspeakers blew out. The crowd became restless and relentlessly threw mud onto the stage, pelting the band. In response, Sparks reached into her pants and threw her tampon back at the crowd, and said, "Eat my used tampon, fuckers!" The tampon became known as one of the "most unsanitary pieces of rock memorabilia in history".

Later in 1992, Sparks dropped her pants, appearing bottomless, on live television during an L7 performance on the UK variety show The Word. Of the incident, Sparks later commented that the particular show L7 appeared on already had questionable aspects underway including "a men's bum contest" and a "hidden camera in Oliver Reed's dressing room, showing him intoxicated with his shirt off, which was really fucked up. So I added my contribution to this craziness."

== Discography ==
=== L7 ===
Year	Title	Label	Notes
1988	L7	Epitaph Records	Debut album
1990	Smell the Magic	Sub Pop	Reissued in 1991 with three extra songs
1992	Bricks Are Heavy	Slash Records	Reached No. 1 on Billboard Heatseekers
1994	Hungry for Stink	Slash Records	Reached No. 2 on Billboard Heatseekers
1997	The Beauty Process: Triple Platinum	Slash Records	First album without bassist Jennifer Finch
1998	Live: Omaha to Osaka	Man's Ruin Records	Live album
1999	Slap-Happy	Wax Tadpole Records	Studio album
2000	The Slash Years	Slash Records	Compilation of popular songs from 1992 to 1997
2016	Fast and Frightening	Easy Action Records	Double album of rarities, covers, and live tracks
2017	Detroit: Live	Easy Action Records	Recorded live at Clutch Cargo's in Detroit 1990
2019	Scatter the Rats	Blackheart Records	Full album, original lineup

=== Viggo Mortensen's Spoken Word ===
Year	Title	Label	Notes
1999	One Man's Meat	TDRS Music	

=== Donita Sparks and the Stellar Moments ===
Year	Title	Label	Notes
2008	Transmiticate	CASH Music	Debut album
