= Decade One =

Compilation album by Babyland
- Released: 2001
- Recorded: 1989 – 1999
- Genre: Electro-industrial; industrial rock; synth punk
- Length: 53:06
- Label: Dependent
- Producer: Dan Gatto; Michael Smith

Dan Gatto chronology
Outlive Your Enemies (1998)	Decade One (2001)	2002 (2002)

Decade One is a compilation album by Babyland, released in 2001 by Dependent Records. As the title suggest, the album compiles tracks drawn from the band's first ten years of recording.

== Track listing ==
All tracks are written by Dan Gatto and Michael Smith, except "Back of Love" by Pete de Freitas, Ian McCulloch, Les Pattinson and Will Sergeant.

No.	Title	From album (date)	Length
1.	"Mask"	1991 (1991)	4:02
2.	"Youth Choker"	Outlive Your Enemies (1998)	5:05
3.	"Kill Bugs"	A Total Letdown (1994)	3:31
4.	"Mindfuck"	1991 (1991)	3:06
5.	"The Door Northern"	Who's Sorry Now? (1995)	5:36
6.	"Worst Case Scenario"	A Total Letdown (1994)	4:41
7.	"Lukewarm"	Who's Sorry Now? (1995)	3:20
8.	"Logan's Run"	1991 (1991)	2:49
9.	"Back of Love" (Echo & the Bunnymen cover)	Workers Compilation (1997)	2:46
10.	"The Issuing Line"	Outlive Your Enemies (1998)	2:38
11.	"Reality"	Reality Under Smrow-Toh (1991)	3:19
12.	"Cop-Out"	A Total Letdown (1994)	2:17
13.	"Double Coupon"	The Doom Generation soundtrack (1995)	3:44
14.	"Sophomore"	Outlive Your Enemies (1998)	6:12

== Personnel ==
Adapted from the Decade One liner notes.

Babyland

- Dan Gatto – lead vocals, keyboards
- Michael Smith – percussion

Design

- Aartvark – cover art

== Release history ==
Region	Date	Label	Format	Catalog
United States	2001	Dependent	CD	Mind 042
