= Pretty Ugly =

Studio album by Lunachicks
- Released: February 18, 1997
- Recorded: 1996
- Genre: Punk rock
- Length: 37:33
- Label: Go-Kart
- Producer: Fat Mike

Lunachicks chronology
Jerk of All Trades (1995)	Pretty Ugly (1997)	Drop Dead Live (1998)

Pretty Ugly is the fourth studio album by the American punk rock band Lunachicks. It was released by Go-Kart Records in 1997.

== Critical reception ==
Professional ratings
Review scores
Source	Rating
AllMusic	4/5 stars
The Encyclopedia of Popular Music	3/5 stars
NME	7/10

Ox-Fanzine called Pretty Ugly "a halfway respectable stupid rock album."

== Track listing ==
All lyrics are written by Theo Kogan except as noted; all music is composed by Lunachicks.

No.	Title	Length
1.	"Yeah"	1:58
2.	"Throwin It Away"	2:19
3.	"The Day Squid's Gerbil Died"	2:56
4.	"Dear Dotti"	2:50
5.	"Mr. Lady"	3:01
6.	"Spork"	1:12
7.	"What's Left"	4:23
8.	"Gone Kissin'"	2:46
9.	"Don't Want You"	3:33
10.	"The Baby"	2:09
11.	"*@#%!**"	1:28
12.	"Wing Chun"	2:08
13.	"Mmm Donuts"	2:24
14.	"Missed It"	4:26
