= Binge & Purge =

Studio album by Lunachicks
- Released: 1992
- Recorded: 1991–1992
- Studio: SST Studios & Rentals (Weehawken, New Jersey)
- Genre: Punk rock
- Length: 35:09
- Label: Safe House
- Producer: Mason Temple

Lunachicks chronology
Babysitters on Acid (1990)	Binge & Purge (1992)	Jerk of All Trades (1995)

Singles from Binge & Purge
- 1. "Apathetic EP" Released: August 14, 1992

Binge & Purge is the second studio album by the American punk rock band Lunachicks, released in 1992 through Safe House Records. The album was mixed at Quad Recording Studios in New York City and mastered at MDI Productions in Toronto. It was the final album to feature drummer Becky Wreck before her departure from the band later that same year. It was also the band's only album released through Safe House before signing to Go-Kart Records the following year.

== Critical reception ==
Professional ratings
Review scores
Source	Rating
AllMusic	2.5/5 stars
The Encyclopedia of Popular Music	3/5 stars

AllMusic called the album "more Poison than punk rock," writing that "the Lunachicks' follow-up to the promising Babysitters on Acid is disjointed and disappointing." Trouser Press wrote that "Binge and Purge, which contains sharply ironic songs about women’s self-image concerns, is the Lunachicks’ great leap forward." Simon Reynolds and Joy Press highlighted the "gleeful revelling in (rather than the repulsion from) the messy murk of female bodiliness." The Philadelphia Inquirer wrote that the album is not without "its simplistic Ramonesy charms," but that "when the 'Chicks upchuck their sense of humor, their monolithic music gets boring fast."

== Track listing ==
All lyrics are written by Theo Kogan except as noted; all music is composed by Lunachicks.

No.	Title	Lyrics	Length
1.	"Apathetic"	Kogan, Becky Wreck	2:35
2.	"Plugg"		3:37
3.	"P.S. Hell"		2:22
4.	"Binge & Purge"		2:36
5.	"Mom"		3:00
6.	"Super Strong"	Wreck	2:26
7.	"This Is Serious"		1:31
8.	"Whole Lotta B.S."		2:21
9.	"2 Bad 4 U"		3:45
10.	"11"		3:14
11.	"Rip U"	Gina Volpe, Kogan	6:25
12.	"C.I.L.L."		2:02
