= Lunachicks =

American punk rock band

Background information
- Origin: New York City, U.S.
- Genres: Punk rock; hardcore punk; alternative rock; riot grrrl
- Years active: 1987–2000 • 2002 • 2004 • 2019–present
- Label: Blast First • Go Kart Records
- Members: Theo Kogan; Gina Volpe; Sydney "Squid" Silver; Chip English
- Past members: Sindi Benezra; Becky Wreck; Gus Morgan (formerly Helen Destroy); Kate Schellenbach

Lunachicks are an American punk rock band from New York City. The band formed in 1987, went on hiatus in 2001, and reunited in 2019. The band cited influences including the Ramones, Kiss, and the MC5.

== History ==
Theo Kogan, Gina Volpe, and Sydney "Squid" Silver were students at New York City's Fiorello H. LaGuardia High School of Music & Art and Performing Arts when they decided to form a band. Sindi Benezra, an acquaintance of Silver, was asked to join shortly after. They rehearsed and wrote material in Gina's bedroom for about a year. Their first composition, the lengthy "Theme Song", was about killing Kogan's and Silver's English teacher. The band played their first show in 1988 with Theo's then-boyfriend Mike on the drums.

Kim Gordon and Thurston Moore of Sonic Youth were amongst the audience for one of their early performances. Gordon and Moore were impressed with the band and sent a demo tape to Paul Smith in England, which landed them a deal on Smith's label Blast First. With drummer Becky Wreck (Susan Rebecca Lloyd) on board they released a self-titled four-song EP in 1989, and the album Babysitters on Acid, both produced by Wharton Tiers. The record was only available in Europe until it was re-released on Go-Kart Records in 2001. The band later expressed their strong dislike for the album's production, and the fact that they did not earn any money from Blast First. The band went on to tour with the Dictators in 1991.

1992 saw the release of their second album, Binge & Purge. Around this time drummer Becky Wreck gained cult popularity for a TV appearance on Howard Stern's Lesbian Dating Game. She left the band some time later and was briefly replaced by Beastie Boys and Luscious Jackson drummer Kate Schellenbach, before Chip English joined. During their first visit to Japan, a six-song EP entitled Sushi A La Mode, featuring a cover of Boston's "More Than a Feeling", was recorded and released in Japan in the fall of 1993.

Lunachicks were signed to New York-based label Go Kart Records, on which they released 1995's Jerk of All Trades. The follow-up, 1997's Pretty Ugly, produced by Ryan Greene and Fat Mike of NOFX, features their most well-known song "Don't Want You", which was promoted with a video. Guitarist Sindi then left the band, after which the band stayed a four-piece. They released their first live album Drop Dead Live in 1998, and then their final album to date, Luxury Problem. By this time, the group had a busy touring schedule, headlining clubs in the United States, Europe, the U.K., and Japan, while opening for the likes of the Ramones, the Buzzcocks, No Doubt, the Go-Go's, Rancid, and NOFX, as well as appearing on the Vans Warped Tour.

Lunachicks joined the Warped Tour in 1999, one of only three female acts along with the Donnas and Bif Naked, and again in 2000. Chip English left the band in the fall of 1999 and was replaced by then 18-year-old Helen Destroy (now known as Gus Morgan), who stayed with the band until it went on hiatus in the summer of 2001. The band never officially disbanded, but had been inactive since then, with the exception of two reunion shows in 2002 and 2004.

Whilst being the front runner for the Lunachicks, Theo Kogan also worked on the side as a model, per request by her friends in the fashion industry. She modeled for Calvin Klein, which ended up being a controversial campaign said to promote "drug use", and Burberry. In an interview with Jon Stewart, Kogan noted that music would always come before modeling and that modeling would always be a side job.

In 2021, the band played two shows at Punk Rock Bowling in Las Vegas. They were the band’s first live performances in 17 years.

== Other activities ==
On September 1, 2021, Hachette Books published the Lunachicks' memoir, Fallopian Rhapsody: The Story of the Lunachicks. It was written with co-author Jeanne Fury.

Kirkus Reviews called the book "Trashy rock ’n’ roll fun—a Thunderbird alternative to typical rock-memoir Chardonnay." New Noise said the book is "a frank, deeply honest telling of the Lunachicks’ history, warts and all."

In 2023, Pretty Ugly: The Story of the Lunachicks, a documentary by director Ilya Chaiken, premiered at DOC NYC festival. The movie was a runner up for the Audience Award and one of the top-streamed films of the 2023 festival. It featured interviews with Debbie Harry and Chris Stein of Blondie, Noodles and Dexter Holland of the Offspring, Donita Sparks and Jennifer Finch of L7, Kate Schellenbach of Luscious Jackson, Miss Guy of the Toilet Boys, rock journalist Jeanne Fury, and others.

== Film appearances ==
Besides being active in music, the band also had a fair share of movie appearances. The first was in a low-budget splatter movie entitled Blue Vengeance (shot in 1989, but not released until 1992). The band also can be seen in the 1990s riot-grrrl documentary, Not Bad For A Girl, as well as Rockstar (produced in 1996, not released commercially until 2004), and High Times' Potluck (2002), both of which featured lead singer Kogan in lead roles. The band also appeared in Terror Firmer, and contributed the song "Say What You Mean" to its soundtrack. Kogan and Silver starred in the movie Hair Burners.

The band has also been involved with movies and music videos in other ways, such as being on soundtracks. In 1997, Kogan danced in the Offspring's video for "I Choose". The movie Boys Don't Cry has their music video for "Don't Want You" playing in the background of a scene. The Olsen twins' movie Getting There has their song "Say What You Mean" on the soundtrack. C.J. Ramone of the Ramones has been seen wearing a Lunachicks shirt several times, most notably in the music video for "Poison Heart".

== Reunions ==
The Lunachicks reunited for a 20-minute set at CBGB's on April 6, 2002, with Benezra on guitar and English on drums. Another reunion took place at the March for Women's Lives Benefit in Washington, D.C., on April 24, 2004, as a four-piece with English on drums. In November 2019, the Lunachicks announced their first reunion in 15 years which they were set to perform two nights at Webster Hall in April 2020. Both shows are sold out, however they were postponed due to the COVID-19 pandemic and were rescheduled for November 26, 2021, and November 27, 2021.

On September 26, 2021, the band played the main stage of the Punk Rock Bowling festival in Las Vegas, opening for Devo. They also played a sold-out afterparty on Friday, September 24. These shows marked the Lunachicks' first live performances in 17 years.

== Other projects ==
- Singer Theo Kogan married Toilet Böys guitarist Sean Pierce, with whom she formed the band Theo & the Skyscrapers, who has released two albums to date (2006's self-titled album and 2007's So Many Ways to Die). She occasionally works as a fashion model and actress. She appeared in Bringing Out the Dead as a prostitute, Zoolander as the tattooed woman in Hansel's loft and Tadpole as a woman at the bar. Kogan now works as a makeup artist full-time.
- Guitarist Gina Volpe formed and fronted her power trio Bantam, which released two records on her own label, Heavy Nose Records. She also wrote the music and lyrics for Homo the Musical, which was written and directed by Lola Rocknrolla. She has composed music scores for several independent films, including Lola Rocknrolla's Nefertitty franchise. In 2017 Gina Volpe teamed up with producer Barb Morrison (Blondie, Franz Ferdinand) and returned to the studio to record Different Animal, her debut solo release a five-song EP, released download-only on April 21, 2017.
- Bassist Sydney Silver used to work as a tattoo artist, and was a restaurant owner. In 2017 she founded health food company Doc's Natural, and established a private practice specializing in business coaching.
- Becky Wreck was the drummer for the Blare Bitch Project in 2002. She played in the band Dirty Cakes from 2019 to 2021.
- Chip English played drums for Suicide King and 1-900-BOXX.
- Helen Destroy (now Gus Morgan) played drums in the all-female Led Zeppelin tribute band, Lez Zeppelin.
- Sindi B aka DJ Sindi Halfrats works on internet radio Sojournradio.com where she features new and old punk music from around the world. Sindi is also promoting and DJing shows around NYC and plays guitar for the band Corporate Plants.

== Band members ==
=== Current members ===
- Theo Kogan – vocals (1987–2000, 2002, 2004, 2019–present)
- Gina Volpe – guitars (1987–2000, 2002, 2004, 2019–present)
- Sydney "Squid" Silver – bass (1987–2000, 2002, 2004, 2019–present)
- Chip English – drums (1994–2000, 2002, 2004, 2019–present)

=== Former members ===
- Sindi Benezra – guitars (1987–1997)
- Becky Wreck – drums (1989–1994)
- Kate Schellenbach – drums (1994)
- Gus Morgan (formerly Helen Destroy) – drums (1999–2000)

== Discography ==
=== Albums ===
- Babysitters on Acid (1990) (Blast First)
- Binge & Purge (1992) (Safe House)
- Jerk of All Trades (1995) (Go Kart Records) US CMJ No. 53
- Pretty Ugly (1997) (Go Kart Records)
- Drop Dead Live (1998) (Go Kart Records)
- Luxury Problem (1999) (Go Kart Records) US CMJ No. 72

=== Singles and EPs ===
- Lunachicks Double 7" (1989)
- "Cookie Monster" / "Complication" 7" (1990)
- "C.I.L.L." / "Plugg" 7" (1992)
- Apathetic EP (1992)
- "F.D.S." / "Light as a Feather" 7" (1993)
- Sushi A La Mode EP (1993, Japan only)
- "Edgar" CD single (1995, promo) US CMJ Alt Video No. 1
- "Don't Want You" CD single (1997, promo)

=== Videos ===
- XXX Naked (1999, home video with video clips and interviews)
