= Babysitters on Acid =

Studio album by Lunachicks
- Released: 1990
- Recorded: 1989–1990
- Genre: Punk rock
- Length: 39:06
- Label: Blast First
- Producer: Wharton Tiers

Lunachicks chronology
Babysitters on Acid (1990)	Binge & Purge (1992)

Babysitters on Acid is the first album by the American punk rock band Lunachicks. It was released in 1990 by Blast First Records. It was re-released in 2001 by Go-Kart Records.

== Critical reception ==
Professional ratings
Review scores
Source	Rating
AllMusic	3/5 stars
The Encyclopedia of Popular Music	2/5 stars

AllMusic wrote that the album "didn't have much to say, but said it with enough base humor and zealous punk antics to keep the spirit of comic anti-revolution alive". Exclaim!, reviewing the reissue, called it "a dopey and young record that basically defies serious criticism". Louder deemed the album "a day-glo classic of ramshackle excess and high-concept absurdity".

== Track listing ==
All songs by Theo Kogan, except where noted.

1. "Jan Brady" - 3:09
2. "Glad I'm Not Yew" - 2:28
3. "Babysitters on Acid" - 4:07
4. "Makin' It (With Other Species)"- 1:38
5. "Mabel Rock" - 3:03
6. "Theme Song" - 6:40
7. "Born 2B Mild" - 2:22
8. "Pin Eye Woman 665" - 3:44
9. "Cookie Core" (Kogan, Silver) - 2:18
10. "Octopussy" - 3:35
11. "Sugar Luv" (Volpe) - 3:47
12. "Complication" - 2:18
