= Subtraction (disambiguation) =

Subtraction is a mathematical operation.

Subtraction or subtract may also refer to:

- - (album), pronounced "Subtract", a 2023 album by Ed Sheeran
- Subtraction (film), a 2022 Iranian thriller
- Subtraction (Babyland song), from the 2008 album Cavecraft
- Subtraction (Sepultura song), from the 1991 album Arise

== See also ==
- Minus sign
- Hyphen (disambiguation)
