= Sydney "Squid" Silver =

- Born: Sydney Lee Silver; November 11, 1969 (age 57); Brooklyn, New York, U.S
- Genres: Riot grrrl, Punk Rock
- Years active: 1987–present
- Label: Go Kart
- Member of: Lunachicks

Sydney "Squid" Silver (Born November 11, 1969) is an American bassist and is notable for being a co-founder and bassist for the Riot Grrl band, Lunachicks.

== Early life ==
Sydney "Squid" Silver was born on November 11, 1969, in Brooklyn, New York.

== Career ==
In 1987 while Sydney was attending Fiorello H. LaGuardia High School of Music & Art and Performing Arts in New York, her and two other classmates (Theo Kogan and Gina Volpe) formed Lunachicks.

After when the band went hiatus in 2000, Sydney has worked as a tattoo artist and restaurateur.

She attended the bands reunion in 2002 and 2004. In 2019 and onwards she has performed with the band.

== Film appearances ==
Year	Title	Role
1995	Not Bad For A Girl	Herself
1999	Gang Girls 2000	Squid
2000	Hair Burner	Ginger-Ray Rogers
2000	Open Return	Jenna

== See also ==
- Lunachicks
- Riot Grrrl
