= The Dogsnatcher EP =

EP by Babyland
- Released: 1992
- Recorded: October – November 1992
- Studio: Wireworks (Rosemead, California)
- Genre: Electro-industrial; synth punk
- Label: Flipside

Dan Gatto chronology
You Suck Crap (1992)	The Dogsnatcher EP (1992)	A Total Letdown (1993)

The Dogsnatcher EP is an EP by Babyland, released in 1992 by Flipside.

== Track listing ==
All tracks are written by Dan Gatto and Michael Smith.

Side one
No.	Title	Length
1.	"Worst Case Scenario"
2.	"Cop-Out"

Side two
No.	Title	Length
1.	"Kill Bugs"
2.	"Hassie"

== Personnel ==
Adapted from the liner notes of The Dogsnatcher EP.

Babyland

- Dan Gatto – lead vocals, keyboards
- Michael Smith – percussion

Production and design

- Rusty Cusick – recording

== Release history ==
Region	Date	Label	Format	Catalog
United States	1992	Flipside	LP	FLIP 047
