= Jerk of All Trades =

Studio album by Lunachicks
- Released: 1995
- Recorded: 1993–1995
- Genre: Punk rock
- Length: 52:34
- Label: Go-Kart
- Producer: Ray Martin

Lunachicks chronology
Binge & Purge (1992)	Jerk of All Trades (1995)	Pretty Ugly (1997)

Jerk of All Trades is a studio album by New York City punk rock band Lunachicks. It was released in 1995 by Go-Kart Records and was produced by Ray Martin.

== Critical reception ==
Professional ratings
Review scores
Source	Rating
AllMusic	4/5 stars
The Encyclopedia of Popular Music	3/5 stars
Entertainment Weekly	A−
Tucson Weekly	3/4 stars

Entertainment Weekly called Jerk of All Trades "an album of punkoid riffs and comic, melodic choruses." Trouser Press wrote: "Inoffensive songs of varying seriousness about pets, dolls, adolescent pranks and reproductive rights ... give the album a conceptual variety thoroughly blunted by the stultifying sameness of the music, a relentless barrage that furiously digs itself down a boring hole." The Sun Sentinel wrote that "roaring guitars and screaming vocals make for a noisy full-length disc, but it's fun in an infantile way." The Deseret News deemed the album "filled with image-altering guitars and hyper-intense arrangements."

The A.V. Club called the title track "arguably Lunachicks’ greatest song."

== Track listing ==
All lyrics are written by Theo Kogan except as noted; all music is composed by Lunachicks.

No.	Title	Length
1.	"Drop Dead"	2:52
2.	"Fingerful"	4:13
3.	"F.D.S."	2:45
4.	"Light as a Feather"	3:15
5.	"Edgar"	3:27
6.	"Dogyard"	2:22
7.	"Buttplug"	1:12
8.	"Bitterness Barbie"	3:13
9.	"Deal with It"	3:38
10.	"Brickface + Stucco"	3:12
11.	"Jerk of All Trades"	2:22
12.	"Spoilt"	3:54
13.	"Ring + Run"	1:46
14.	"Fallopian Rhapsody"	4:27
15.	"Insomnia"	3:44
16.	"Why Me?"	6:12

For track 11, "Jerk of All Trades," trumpet is played by Tommy Kennedy.
