= Ramdasha Bikceem =

American writer and musician

- Occupations: Writer; singer; musician
- Known for: GUNK
- Notable work: GUNK

Ramdasha Bikceem is an American writer, singer, and musician. They published the pioneering riot grrrl zine GUNK in the early 1990s, which explored intersections of race and gender in punk and skateboarding.

== History ==
Bikceem was raised in New Jersey in the 1970s, by parents into music and art. They were influenced by Joan Jett, X-Ray Spex, Grace Jones, Lunachicks, Run DMC, and Queen Latifah. They found out about riot grrrl zines, such as Bikini Kill and Girl Germs, after a friend became Tobi Vail's roommate in Olympia, Washington. In 1990, at the age of 15, Bikceem started their own zine GUNK focused on punk, skateboarding, feminism, and racism. They published five issues, which contained multiple essays attempting to articulate the double burden of being a black person and a girl. In GUNK #4 Bikceem wrote about the politics of being a Black grrrl: "I'll go out somewhere with my friends who all look equally as weird as me, but say we get hassled by the cops for skating or something. That cop is going to remember my face a lot clearer than say one of my white girlfriends." They also wrote about the lack of diversity within riot grrrl. Excerpts from GUNK were reprinted in The Riot Grrrl Collection anthology, compiled by Lisa Darms from the Riot Grrrl Archives at Fales Library at NYU.

Bikceem started playing guitar when they were around 14 or 15. They sang and played guitar in a band under the name Gunk that performed at the first Riot Grrrrl Convention in 1992 in Washington, D.C. A clip of this performance and an interview with Bikceem was featured in Lisa Rose Apramian's 1995 music documentary Not Bad for a Girl.

Bikceem moved to Brooklyn, New York in 1993. They attended Pratt University. In the early 2000s, they recorded vocals with Le Tigre, including songs released on their album From the Desk of Mr. Lady. Bikceem released the electronic dance-punk song "Good News" under the name Designer Imposter in 2007. In 2020, Bikceem created a soundtrack for New York-based artist Jonathan Berger's re-imagining of the Aspen Art Museum's gift shop.
