= 1991 (disambiguation) =

1991 was a common year starting on Tuesday of the Gregorian calendar.

1991 may also refer to:

- 1991 (number)
- 1991 (film), a 2018 Canadian film
- Lynyrd Skynyrd 1991, a 1991 album
- 1991 (Azealia Banks EP), 2012
- 1991 (Babyland EP), 1991
- 1991, a 1991 album by Izrael
- 1991, a 2019 album by TopGunn
- "1991", a song by Tesla Boy from the 2013 album The Universe Made of Darkness
