= Luxury Problem =

Studio album by Lunachicks
- Released: June 1, 1999
- Recorded: December 1998–January 1999
- Studios: Excello (Brooklyn, New York)
- Genre: Punk rock
- Length: 41:51
- Label: Go-Kart
- Producers: Phil Hernandez, Chris Maxwell

Lunachicks chronology
Drop Dead Live (1998)	Luxury Problem (1999)

Luxury Problem is the fifth studio album by the American punk rock band Lunachicks, released on June 1, 1999, through Go-Kart Records. Following the departure of guitarist Sindi Benezra in 1997, it is the only album with the band as a quartet. It is also their most recent album, having been on hiatus since 2001.

== Production ==
The album was recorded after the departure of guitarist Sindi Benezra, making the band a quartet.

== Critical reception ==
Professional ratings
Review scores
Source	Rating
AllMusic	3/5 stars
Robert Christgau	(choice cut)
The Encyclopedia of Popular Music	3/5 stars

Ox-Fanzine called Luxury Problems "a noisy, in no way overproduced punk rock album with a certain 'indie rock' touch ... a solid, satisfying proposition." CMJ New Music Report wrote that the band retains "its fatal chops and sharp lyrical teeth."

== Track listing ==
All lyrics are written by Theo Kogan except as noted; all music is composed by Lunachicks.

No.	Title	Length
1.	"Less Teeth, More Tits"	3:07
2.	"Luxury Problem"	2:53
3.	"I'll Be the One"	1:39
4.	"Crash"	4:08
5.	"Terror Firmer"	2:16
6.	"Say What You Mean"	2:14
7.	"Nowhere Fast"	3:36
8.	"Bad Ass Bitch"	4:08
9.	"Shut You Out"	3:34
10.	"Cuming into My Own"	1:57
11.	"Hope to Die"	4:03
12.	"Knuckle Sandwich"	1:11
13.	"The Return of Brickface & Stucco"	2:02
14.	"Subway"	3:33
15.	"Down at the Pub"	1:30

Bonus tracks
No.	Title	Length
16.	"Heart of Glass (Blondie Cover)" (Japanese Release bonus track)
