= Bulimia Banquet =

Former American punk band

- Origin: El Segundo, Los Angeles, Hermosa Beach, California, United States
- Genres: Punk rock, heavy metal
- Years active: 1986-1991
- Labels: Flipside Records, Piece of Mind
- Past members: Jula Bell (b/v); Ingrid Baumgart (g/v); Alan Hansford (g); Jason Greenwood (d); Dez Cadena (g); Steve Drojensky (g); Mia Ferraro (g); Travis Johnson (d)

Bulimia Banquet was an American punk band with members from Downtown Los Angeles, Hollywood, Hermosa Beach, and El Segundo, California, United States. They formed in 1986. Fronted by guitarist Ingrid Baumgart and bassist Jula Bell, the band is regarded as one of the forerunners of the riot grrrl movement of the 1990s. The band released two albums and disbanded in 1991.

== History ==
=== Formation ===
Bulimia Banquet traces its roots to an earlier band, Minions of Parody, which existed in Southern California in 1985. The band featured two future members of Bulimia Banquet — bassist and vocalist Jula Bell and guitarist Alan Hansford. Bell, an opera aficionado who studied the musical form at Boston University and USC, began playing informally with guitarist Ingrid Baumgart. When another guitarist and drummer was needed, the duo called upon Hansford and Greg Cameron (SWA). The band Bulimia Banquet was born in 1986. They then had Nick Passiglia (Nip Drivers) playing drums for a few gigs, until they hired Jason Greenwood to play drums. Greenwood was formerly of the San Francisco band Playing Under the Influence and was only 15 when he joined the band

Bulimia Banquet's lyrics were primarily written by its female vocalists, Baumgart and Bell, with all members of the band contributing to the writing of original music.

=== Musical importance ===
Bulimia Banquet is recognized for pioneering the riot grrrl movement of the 1990s, and is featured in a 1995 documentary film by Lisa Rose Apramian, Not Bad for a Girl.

The band played an intense style, which it described in a 1987 Flipside interview as "silly, fast, rockin', wild." The band was dismissive of all-women bands that took a soft, melodic pop approach, as band leader Jula Bell noted:

"Stupid, feathery girl bands — I hate that. We've seen all of that. I don't want people looking at me for my body, looking at me going, 'Look at that, I want to fuck that.' I'm not up there for that.... It's not right. If we want an egalitarian world you gotta be androgynous.... I'm not talking about the new wave androgyny, I'm talking girls are tough, and guys...can be feminine. There's a balance."

=== Other personnel ===
Mia Ferraro, Dez Cadena, Steve Drojensky, and Travis Johnson were also in the band for a period of time.

=== Break up and later projects ===
Bulimia Banquet released two albums, a single, and tracks for compilation albums. The band's final release appeared in 1991.

Jula Bell has been featured in a number of other local bands including Nip Drivers, Bobsled, and Marc Spitz Freestyle. She has done punk rock autoharp solo gigs and has also played autoharp in the L.A. based rock group, Miss Derringer. Ingrid Baumgart was in the all female punk band, Raszebrae and Malicious Grind. Bell was featured singing with Devo in the Tank Girl film in 1995, in the opening sequence song "Girl U Want".

Jason Greenwood was also in the T.V.T.V's (Flipside Records) and Punk Rock Vato's with Jamie Pina (Chemical People), Pat Hoed (aka. Adam Bomb), and Rick Agnew (the Adolescents, Christian Death). In June 2018, Greenwood died of a drug overdose at the age of 46.

== Discography ==
=== Albums ===
- Eat Fats, Die Young (1986, Flipside Records)
- Party My Colon (1989, Flipside Records)

=== 7-inch vinyl ===
- Curse Me 7" (1991, Piece of Mind)

=== Compilations ===
- Flipside Vinyl Fanzine (1987, Flipside Records)
- Gabba Gabba Hey - A Tribute to the Ramones - (1991, Triple X Records)
- Welcome to our Nightmare- A Tribute to Alice Cooper -Triple X Records

=== Videos ===
- Dine or Die
