= Luxury Problems =

Luxury Problems may refer to:

- Luxury Problems (Patrick Duff album)
- Luxury Problems (Andy Stott album)
- Luxury Problem, a 1999 album by Lunachicks
