= Not Bad for a Girl =

- Directed by: Lisa Rose Apramian
- Produced by: Lisa Rose Apramian; Kyle C. Kyle; Kurt Cobain; Courtney Love; Tina Silvey
- Starring: Lori Barbero; Kat Bjelland; Ramdasha Bikceem; Mia d'Bruzzi; Jill Emery; Eric Erlandson; Kristen Pfaff; Patty Schemel; Lisa Fay; Jennifer Finch; Suzi Gardner; Maureen Herman; Joan Jett; Courtney Love; Bambi Nonymous; Demetra Plakas; Lesley Rankine; Jula Bell; Gilly Hanner; Caroline Rue; Donita Sparks; Rachel Thoele; Becky Wreck; Theo Kogan; Gina Volpe; Sydney "Squid" Silver; Kate Schellenbach; Erika Reinstein; Anie Stanley
- Edited by: Kyle C. Kyle
- Distributed by: Spitshine Productions; Quantum Enterprises
- Release date: 1995
- Running time: 90 minutes
- Country: United States
- Language: English

Not Bad for a Girl is a documentary on women musicians of the 1990s from the indie rock music genre grunge and riot grrrl and celebrates madness, creativity, and gender play. It was written, directed, produced and shot by rock phenomenologist feminist Lisa Rose Apramian, edited, shot and co-produced by drummer Kyle C. Kyle and co-produced by Courtney Love and Kurt Cobain. A DVD, with a booklet, was available for purchase at the official website (until 2019 when the website was shut down) and a release date for the sequel book is still in the works as of 2019.

The bands featured in the film were Hole, L7, Lunachicks, Babes in Toyland, Joan Jett, Calamity Jane, Bulimia Banquet, The Mudwimin, Silverfish, 7 Year Bitch, Bratmobile, and Bikini Kill. Courtney Love and Kurt Cobain provided funding for the film. Skateboarder and snowboarder Cara-Beth Burnside is also featured on the beginning and end titles.

The documentary features in-depth interviews with every band member, including Donita Sparks and Jennifer Finch from L7, Courtney Love from Hole, Kat Bjelland from Babes in Toyland, and Becky Wreck from the Lunachicks along with clips from live performances from 1989 to 1994. It also features female rock communities including riot grrrl and the first annual Riot Grrl Convention, Rock 'n' Roll High School of Melbourne Australia, and the Feminist Majority Foundation sponsored "Rock for Choice" benefits with L7/Joan Jett. According to press releases, the film explores themes such as the musicians' relationship to creativity and music, the negotiation of gender identity and gender performance (feminist term coined by Judith Butler) through rock, subversion of stereotypes and gendered expectations through stage play performances and stylization of the body, and the processes of healing and reclaiming through musical expressions.

The sequel Not Bad for a Girl book contains images, anecdotes, reviews, interviews from many more bands unable to fit into the original including Bikini Kill, Bratmobile, Strangefruit, 7 Year Bitch, Tribe 8, Dickless, Girl in a Coma and rock musicians in France, Japan, Brazil, Italy and the Middle East.

It was awarded Best Documentary at the New York Underground Film Festival 1996, Nominated: Best Director, 19th Atlanta Film and Video Festival 1995.

== Screenings ==
The film was screened at film festivals, including the following:

- First Annual Los Angeles Independent Film Festival, Directors Guild of America and Raleigh Studios, Los Angeles, CA, April, 1995
- 22nd Athens International Film and Video Festival, Athens, OH, May 1995
- 19th Atlanta Film and Video Festival, Nominated: Best Director, Atlanta GA, June 1995
- Le Nouveau Festival, now called Festival du Nouveau Cinema, International Cinema Video, Montreal, Quebec, CA June 1995
- 44th Melbourne International Film Festival, Melbourne, Australia, June 1995
- 42nd Sydney Film Festival, Sydney, Australia, June 1995
- 5th Jump Cut International Film Festival, Perth, Australia, July 1995
- Festival Internacional de Cinema, Lisboa, Portugal, Aug-September 1995
- Hamburg International Film Festival, Hamburg, Germany September 1995
- 31st Chicago International Film Festival, Chicago, Il, October 1995
- Musik-Film Fest: International Film Festival, Amsterdam, the Netherlands, October 1995
- Sinking Creek Film Festival (Nashville Film Festival)November 1995
- Third Annual New York Underground Film Festival, New York Film Academy, Winner: Best Documentary Feature, March 1996
- 18th Créteil International Women's Film Festival: Films des Femmes, Créteil, France, March 1996
- 21st Berlin International Film Festival, Berlin, Germany, March 1996
- Reel Music Film Festival, Northwest Film Center, Portland, OR April 1996
- 4th Annual Boston International Festival of Women's Cinema, Brattle Theatre, Cambridge, MA April/May 1996
- One Reel Film Festival, Bumbershoot, Seattle WA, August 1996
- Underground Film Festival, Honolulu Museum of Art, Honolulu, HI, November 1996
- Third Sheffield International Documentary Festival, Sheffield, UK 1996
- German Film Institute Festival, Berlin, Germany, January 1997
- 20th Anniversary International Gay and Lesbian Film Festival, Gay Pride Week, San Francisco, CA June 1997

In addition to these festivals, it was also screened at many universities, museums and conferences some of which are listed below:

- Hallwalls Contemporary Arts Center, Women in Film Series, Tribute to Ginger Rogers, Buffalo, NY, Winter 1993 (screened as a work-in-progress)
- University of Minnesota Film Society, University Film Center, Fall 1994
- Boston University, Film Dept, Boston, MA, Fall 1995
- Portland Art Museum, Rock Documentaries, Portland, OR, Winter 1996
- 21st Annual Feminist Psychology Conference, Association for Women in Psychology, Oregon, Winter 1996
- Bowling Green State University, Women's Studies, Bowling Green, OH, February 1996
- Washington State University, American Studies, “American Movement Cultures: Boundaries, Bodies, Borders,” Pullman, WA, Spring 1996
- University of Southern California, Women's Studies, Los Angeles, CA, Spring 1996
- University of Southern California, Dept of Communication: Popular Culture, Los Angeles, CA, Spring 1996
- Madison University, Women's Studies, Gulfport, MS, Spring 1996
- University of Washington, Women's Studies, Seattle, WA, 1997
- Harvard University, Women's Studies, Cambridge, MA, November 1997
- Long Beach Museum of Art, Long Beach, CA, February 1999
- University of Michigan, Ann Arbor, Michigan, 2001

Its art house and theatrical screenings include:

- ED VIC MOVIE HOUSE, San Francisco, CA, August, 1996
- FILMHOUSE, Edinburgh, Scotland, May 1996
- DEUTSCHE INSTITUTE FUR FILMKIND, Amsterdam, Netherlands, October 1996
- NUART THEATER, Los Angeles, CA, October 18–24, 1996
- CINEMA DU PARC, Montreal, Quebec, Canada, November 1–14, 1996
- CINEMA VILLAGE, New York, NY, November 22–29, 1996
- NEIGHBORHOOD FILM SOCIETY, Philadelphia, PA, December 11–13, 1996
- WINNIPEG FILM GROUP, Winnipeg, Manitoba, Canada, December 11–14, 1996
- CINEMATEQUE, Cleveland, OH, January 18–19, 1997
- BRATTLE THEATER, Cambridge, MA, February 4, 1997
- CINEFEST FILM THEATRE, Cambridge, MA, February 18–19, 1997
- BRATTLE THEATRE, Cambridge, MA Return Engagement, March 11, 1997
- ROXIE THEATER, San Francisco, CA, April 1–3, 1997
- LARK THEATER, Larkspur, CA, April 4–5, 1997
- WORMWOOD’S THEATRE, Halifax, NS, Canada, April 11–14, 1997
- ROXIE THEATER, San Francisco, CA Return Engagement, April 18–25. 1997

It is in the permanent collection of many universities for students to watch and study.
