= You Suck Crap =

Studio album by Babyland
- Released: 1992
- Recorded: December 1990 – March 1992
- Studio: Various: Commercial Soundworks; (Hollywood, California); Paramount Recording Studios; (Hollywood, California; Wireworks; (Rosemead, California
- Genre: Industrial rock; synth punk
- Length: 70:54
- Label: Flipside

Dan Gatto chronology
1991 (1991)	You Suck Crap (1992)	The Dogsnatcher EP (1993)

You Suck Crap is the debut studio album of Babyland, released in 1992 by Flipside Records.

== Reception ==
Professional ratings
Review scores
Source	Rating
AllMusic	4/5 stars

Ned Raggett of AllMusic describes the album as "frenetic, outraged experimental techno-industrialized hardcore." The critic went on to note the band for "having made its reputation as a killer live-act playing self-described "electronic junk punk," translating that energy to CD inevitably lost the visual power of the band—the amount of metal cans, drums, and instrumentation the two normally work with is a sight to behold, as is Dan's totally in-your-face, anguished singing—but Crap still made a more-than-fine document of the duo's early sound. I Die:You Die said "You Suck Crap occupies its own space outside of the genres it borrows from, which is perhaps why their “electronic junk punk” label continues to resonate" and "what makes it even more applicable is the consistency with which Smith and Gatto approach their distinct style, even while seemingly deviating from it."

== Track listing ==
All tracks are written by Dan Gatto and Michael Smith.

No.	Title	Length
1.	"Structure Fall"	2:27
2.	"Mask"	4:02
3.	"The Advance"	4:42
4.	"Increased Turnover"	2:35
5.	"Traffic"	4:36
6.	"Logan's Run"	2:49
7.	"Burning Up"	3:36
8.	"Arthur Jermyn"	4:02
9.	"Smrow-Toh"	5:18
10.	"Don't You Feel Lost"	2:51
11.	"Mindfuck"	3:07
12.	"Under"	3:08
13.	"Fault"	4:10
14.	"Motor.Tool.Appliance"	3:17
15.	"Reality"	3:21
16.	"Thekadont"	16:53

== Personnel ==
Adapted from the You Suck Crap liner notes.

Babyland

- Dan Gatto – lead vocals, keyboards
- Michael Smith – percussion

Production and design

- Rusty Cusick – recording (1, 4, 7, 10, 13, 16)
- Doug Green – recording (3, 5, 8, 9, 12, 15)
- Don Lewis – cover art, photography
- Stoker – recording (2, 6, 11, 14)

== Release history ==
Region	Date	Label	Format	Catalog
United States	1992	Flipside	CD, LP	FLIP 44
United States	1999	Mattress	CD	MAT003
