= Theo & the Skyscrapers =

Theo & The Skyscrapers
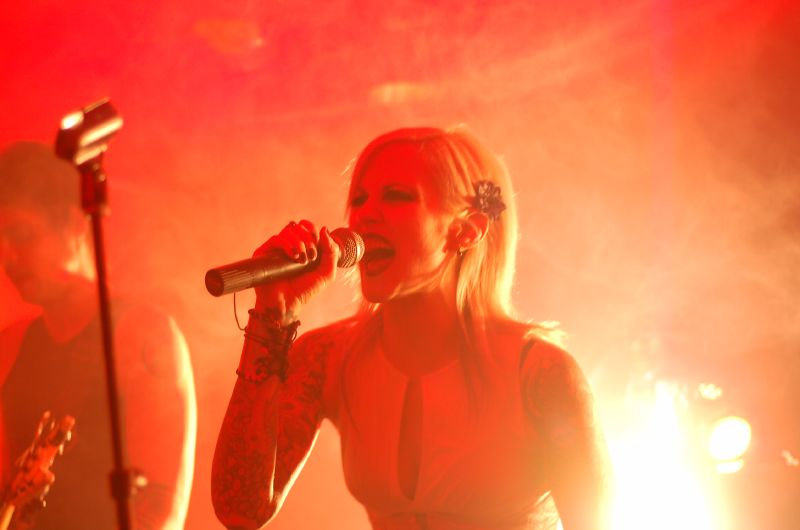
- Theo & the Skyscrapers live December 16, 2005.

Background information
- Origin: New York City, USA
- Genres: Electronic
- Label: Dark Daddy Records
- Members: Theo Kogan; Sean Pierce; Chris Kling; Dimitry Makhnosky
- Website: TheoAndTheSkyscrapers.com

Theo & the Skyscrapers are an experimental electronic band from New York City consisting of Theo Kogan (formerly of the band Lunachicks, and also a model and actress), Sean Pierce (of Toilet Böys), Chris Kling and Dimitry Makhnosky. Their sound has also been described as "a cross breed of new wave and metal". and a "gloriously trashy technicolor electro-clash disco cabaret, with quirky art-punk and metallic overtones."

In the fall of 2003, Theo and her husband, Sean, met Chris and Dimitry and Theo & the Skyscrapers was formed. The band released Theo and the Skyscrapers in 2006 and So Many Ways to Die in 2007 on their record label, Dark Daddy Records.

The band are involved in a video installation/rock performance called Screen Test by Rob Roth, who also did several of their music videos.

== Discography ==
- Theo and the Skyscrapers (2006)
- So Many Ways To Die (2007)
