= Sex Music =

Sex Music may refer to:

- Sex Music (album), an album by punk/glam rock band Toilet Böys.
- "Sex Music" (song), a song by American singer Tank.
