= Drop Dead Live =

Live album by Lunachicks
- Released: August 18, 1998
- Recorded: Coney Island High, NYC, February 21, 1998
- Genre: Punk rock
- Length: 57:34
- Label: Go-Kart

Lunachicks chronology
Pretty Ugly (1997)	Drop Dead Live (1998)	Luxury Problem (1999)

Professional ratings
Review scores
Source	Rating
AllMusic	3/5 stars

Drop Dead Live is a live album by the American punk rock band Lunachicks. It was released by Go-Kart Records in 1998.

== Production ==
The album was recorded at New York City's Coney Island High, in February 1998.

== Track listing ==
1. "Yeah"
2. "FDS"
3. "The Day Squid's Gerbil Died"
4. "Gone Kissin"
5. "Fingerful"
6. "Thrown It Away"
7. "Spork"
8. "Don't Want You"
9. "Jerk of All Trades"
10. "Wing Chun"
11. "Bitterness Barbie"
12. "Drop Dead"
13. "Donuts"
14. "The Passenger"
15. "Buttplug"
16. "Crash"
17. "Dear Dotti"
18. "#%@!"
19. "Spoilt"
