= Colicchio =

Colicchio is an Italian surname. Notable people with the surname include:

- Tom Colicchio (born 1962), American chef
- Victor Colicchio (born 1953), American actor, screenwriter, musician, and songwriter
