= Live Execution =

LIVE EXECUTION

Live album by Babyland
- Released: January 20, 2013
- Recorded: January 31, 2009
- Studio: The Smell (Los Angeles, California)
- Genre: Synthpop
- Length: 70:06
- Label: Mattress

Dan Gatto chronology
Continues (2012)	LIVE EXECUTION (2013)

LIVE EXECUTION is a live album by Babyland, released on January 20, 2013, by Mattress Recordings.

== Reception ==
I Die:You Die said "there's enough grit and crowd noise to separate it from the albums we know so well, but it doesn’t ever feel removed from the moment it was recorded, the energy and effort conveyed with each strike of an oil drum and Dan’s increasingly hoarse and ragged voice on climactic renditions of "Gehry" and "You Will Never Have It"."

== Track listing ==
All tracks are written by Dan Gatto and Michael Smith.

No.	Title	Length
1.	"Nativity"	5:39
2.	"Mindfuck"	3:26
3.	"Last Ave."	3:59
4.	"The End of All Summers"	4:48
5.	"Rimer Drive Tiger"	3:39
6.	"Youth Choker"	5:16
7.	"Dismissal"	7:42
8.	"Subtraction"	6:50
9.	"Reality"	4:18
10.	"Past Lives"	3:45
11.	"Worst Case Scenario"	5:54
12.	"Gehry"	4:56
13.	"You Will Never Have It"	5:23
14.	"Search and Rescue"	4:31

== Personnel ==
Adapted from the LIVE EXECUTION liner notes.

Babyland

- Dan Gatto – vocals, instruments
- Michael Smith – percussion

Production and design

- Jean Béraud – cover art, illustrations
- Larry Goetz – recording, mixing

== Release history ==
Region	Date	Label	Format	Catalog
United States	2012	Mattress	DL	MAT019
