= Who's Sorry Now? =

Who's Sorry Now? may refer to:

- "Who's Sorry Now?" (song), a 1923 popular song by Ted Snyder, Bert Kalmar and Harry Ruby
- Who's Sorry Now? (Connie Francis album), 1958
- Who's Sorry Now (album), by Marie Osmond, 1975
- Who's Sorry Now? (Babyland album), 1995
- Who's Sorry Now?, a 1984 autobiography by Connie Francis
