= Living Like a Millionaire =

Living Like A Millionaire

Studio album by Toilet Böys
- Released: 1998
- Studio: LOHO, New York City (tracks 1, 2 & 6); Sigma Sound, Philadelphia (tracks 3, 4 & 5)
- Genre: Laser punk / Go-Go Rock
- Label: RAFR
- Producer: Shane Trimble, Toilet Böys, Sean Pierce

Toilet Böys chronology
Toilet Böys (1996)	Living Like A Millionaire (1998)	Sinners and Saints (1999)

Professional ratings
Review scores
Source	Rating
Allmusic	4/5 stars

Living Like a Millionaire is the second album by New York-based punk/glam rock band Toilet Böys.

== Track listing ==
1. Rocket City – 2:53
2. Turn It Up – 2:45
3. Another Day in the Life – 3:25
4. Go Go Boy – 3:11
5. Electric – 3:40
6. Living Like a Millionaire – 2:49
