= Babyland =

American rock band

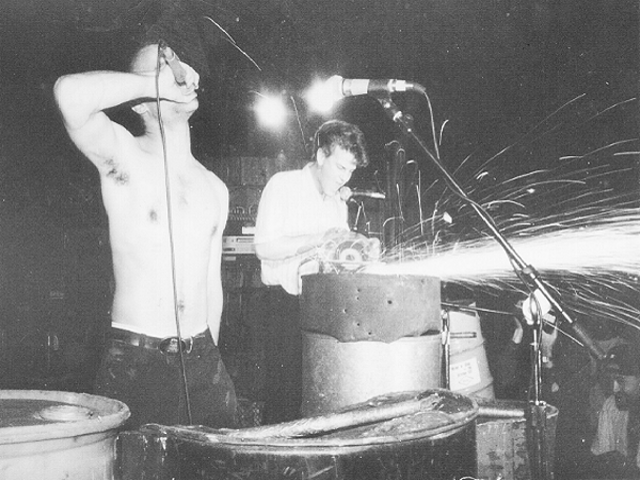

Background information
- Origin: Los Angeles, California, U.S.
- Genres: Electro-industrial; industrial rock; synth punk
- Years active: 1989–2009
- Labels: dependent; Flipside; Mattress Recordings; Metropolis Records
- Past members: Dan Gatto; Michael Smith

Babyland was an American performance-based independent electronic junk punk band from Los Angeles featuring Dan Gatto performing vocals and electronics and Michael Smith on percussion. The band released six studio albums before disbanding in 2009: You Suck Crap (1992), A Total Letdown (1994), Who's Sorry Now (1995), Outlive Your Enemies (1998), The Finger (2004), and Cavecraft (2008).

== History ==
Babyland was formed in 1989 by vocalist and programmer Dan Gatto and percussionist Michael Smith from Los Angeles. They were advocates of the DIY punk ethic and part of the musical underground culture and were well regarded in Industrial music, punk rock, indie rock, and electronic music communities. Gatto and Smith met while in college, their first collaboration being a project for a musical culture class. The duo created an audio-visual work for the class which provided the idea for starting the band.

In 1991, the band released their debut EP 1991 and later that year the single Reality Under Smrow-Toh on the Los Angeles punk rock label Flipside. In 1992 the song "Mindf_" was provided to the If It Moves... compilation The Cyberflesh Conspiracy and in 1993 the band produced a cover of Madonna's "Burning Up" for the Shut Up Kitty: A Cyber-Based Covers Compilation by Re-Constriction Records.

Recordings prior to 1996 continued to be released by Flipside, including the band's first three albums: You Suck Crap (1992), A Total Letdown (1994) and Who's Sorry Now (1995). The albums were well received by critics and Alternative Press credited the band with embodying "all the confusion, resentment, anger, and frustration felt by an entire generation." The band released their fourth album Outlive Your Enemies on Mattress Recordings in 1998. The band participated in several events in Mojave Desert for Flipside. Later material has been released by the band's own label, Mattress.

The fifth full-length The Finger and a compilation of earlier songs Decade One was released in Europe by dependent. Most recently, a deal with Metropolis Records resulted in the wider commercial release of the band's sixth album Cavecraft. A post to the band's Myspace site on October 9, 2009 confirmed the group's breakup 20 years after their formation. In 2013 the live album Live Execution was released, which documented a live performance made on January 1, 2009, at The Smell in Los Angeles.

== Live performances ==
Known for their live performances, Babyland shared the stage with bands such as The Offspring, Ethyl Meatplow, Grotus, Legendary Pink Dots, Dystopia, Foetus, Add N to (X), Nitzer Ebb, VNV Nation, and Psychic TV. Most of their live performances occurred in underground locations including LA's Jabberjaw, Kontrol Faktory, The Smell, Long Beach's Bogart's, and 924 Gilman in Berkeley, California. Many of their shows integrated an industrial music ethic that involved building sets with items like scaffolding and functional televisions, which the band destroyed with hand and power tools over the course of the show.

== Other projects ==
In between recording for Babyland, Gatto formed Recliner with Daniel Vahnke, a composer on Vampire Rodents and produced "Trilobite" and "Nosedive", songs which appeared on the 1993 compilation Rivet Head Culture. Both compositions appeared on Vampire Rodents' third studio album Lullaby Land later that year. Another collaboration by Recliner was recorded and titled "Zygote", released on the 1994 compilation Scavengers in the Matrix and later on Vampire Rodents' fourth album Clockseed in 1995. In 2012 vocalist Dan Gatto released a synth-pop project called Continues.

== Discography ==
Studio albums

- You Suck Crap (Flipside, 1992)
- A Total Letdown (Flipside, 1994)
- Who's Sorry Now (Flipside, 1995)
- Outlive Your Enemies (Mattress, 1998)
- The Finger (Dependent/Mattress, 2004)
- Cavecraft (Mattress, 2008)

Extended plays

- 1991 (Flipside, 1991)
- The Dogsnatcher EP (Flipside, 1992)
- 2002 (Mattress, 2002)
- Past Lives (Mattress, 2004)
- Not Modern (Mattress, 2008)

Live albums

- LIVE EXECUTION (Mattress, 2013)

Compilation albums

- Decade One (Dependent, 2001)

Singles

- Reality Under Smrow-Toh (Flipside, 1992)
- Stomach (Flipside, 1993)
