= Manda and the Marbles =

American pop punk and new wave band

Manda and the Marbles were a pop punk/ new wave band from Columbus, Ohio.

== History ==
Many grown-up children of the '80s have a special place in their hearts for ladies such as the Go-Go's, Bananarama, and Kim "Kids in America" Wilde. Their music was pouty, awash in lip gloss and hairspray, and absolutely irresistible. Their songs made pining and heartache sound like so much friggin' fun. Finally, the valley girl woes have a new poster girl: Manda Marble. Manda and the Marbles are a Columbus, Ohio trio whose songs mirror those of sassy female-fronted pop bands – sunny surf rhythms and rather forlorn subject matter.

Jeanne Fury, Review of Manda and The Marbles, NY Rock Confidential, March, 2003

Who is Manda you might ask? Well just take the best of the Go-Go's, Berlin, and your favorite girl-fronted 80's new wave pop band...that's Manda. This will be the soundtrack to many a summer. Prepare to have your hearts broken.

Punk Updates, October 15, 2002, in relation to release of More Seduction

Founded in 1997, the group produced four albums: Rock's Not Dead, Seduction, More Seduction, and Angels With Dirty Faces. The band was originally a three-piece featuring Manda Marble on vocals and bass, Joe A. Damage on guitar, and Mark Slak on drums. Work on their most recent album featured keyboardist Elias Dubok, 2001 was the band's breakout year; they played at the CMJ Music Marathon and later signed with Go-Kart Records.

The Marbles were the first band to release a song using podcasting and were heralded for this achievement on MTV and the BBC. While the band's latest album, Angels With Dirty Faces (to which the podcast distribution related), released on September 17, 2002, was well-received, the label to which it had been licensed, Addison Records, ceased operations within a short time after the album's 2005 release.

Following guitarist Joe A. Damage's departure in late 2005, the band's activity slowed considerably. In 2008, Manda Marble and Mark Slak recorded a new demo and posted it on their MySpace page, but nothing has been heard since. The band website (www.marthaandthemarbles.com) is also inactive.

Manda and the Marbles' music was featured in several motion pictures, including the low budget thriller Creepies (2003) and the 1980s throwback Nail Polish (2006). Their music also appeared on the MTV show Rich Girls (2003-2004), and the band's image and name were shown in the film Come Away Home (2005).

Over the years, Manda has continued to write music. She released a new album in 2023 which featured all of the singles she wrote from 2015 through 2020. This album is called "The Singles: 2015-2020" and is available for download on all music platforms. The songs have shifted towards an acoustic and more folk-influenced style but still retain a pop edge. Manda has also dabbled in the electronic dance music genre and continues to explore her creative boundaries musically. You can listen to Manda Marble's current music on Spotify https://open.spotify.com/artist/0I1BlbqjnzUKWHr8SW1JJf

== Discography ==
=== Albums ===
- 1999 Rock's Not Dead Break Up Records
- 2001 Seduction Break Up Records
- 2002 More Seduction Go-Kart Records (Remastered Seduction, with four new songs)
- 2005 Angels With Dirty Faces Sickhouse Records, licensed to Addison Records

=== Compilation Contributions ===
- 2002 Fields and Streams Kill Rock Stars Records. "New tracks by 45 indie artists", including "Sex Object" by Manda and The Marbles.
