= Outlive Your Enemies =

Studio album by Babyland
- Released: 1998
- Genre: Industrial rock; synth punk
- Length: 63:00
- Label: Mattress
- Producer: Dan Gatto; Michael Rozon; Michael Smith

Dan Gatto chronology
Who's Sorry Now? (1995)	Outlive Your Enemies (1998)	Decade One (2001)

Outlive Your Enemies is the fourth studio album by Babyland, released in 1998 by Mattress Recordings.

== Reception ==
Professional ratings
Review scores
Source	Rating
AllMusic	4/5 stars

Ned Raggett of AllMusic awarded Outlive Your Enemies four out of five stars, describing the album as "brilliant" and saying it "captured the duo still slamming out some gripping electronic rage, but with a new tunefulness and drama that made them even more special than before." The critic also said "Babyland play around with a variety of sounds and approaches on Outlive, some being newer takes on older approaches – the synth-horn driven grandeur of "Hillhurst," the frazzled protest in "Mini Mall."

== Track listing ==
All tracks are written by Dan Gatto and Michael Smith.

No.	Title	Length
1.	"Omaha"	2:08
2.	"Youth Choker"	5:04
3.	"Hillhurst"	3:52
4.	"Safe Equals No Sound"	4:09
5.	"Wrong Nominee"	3:08
6.	"Test Pilot"	4:04
7.	"Creeping Up"	5:44
8.	"Sophomore"	6:14
9.	"The Issuing Line"	2:37
10.	"Mini Mall"	5:06
11.	"Five Fingers"	3:57
12.	"Dyn-O-Mite!"	4:43
13.	"Fucked Equipment"	3:11
14.	"01"	4:32
15.	"It Never Ends"	4:31

== Personnel ==
Adapted from the Outlive Your Enemies liner notes.

Babyland

- Dan Gatto – lead vocals, keyboards
- Michael Smith – percussion

Production and design

- Aartvark – cover art, photography
- Babyland – production
- Michael Rozon – production, recording, mixing, mastering

== Release history ==
Region	Date	Label	Format	Catalog
United States	1998	Mattress	CD	MAT002
