= The Finger (album) =

Studio album by Babyland
- Released: October 18, 2004
- Recorded: Mathlab
- Genre: Industrial rock, synth punk
- Length: 51:40
- Label: Dependent/Mattress
- Producer: Babyland

Dan Gatto chronology
Past Lives (2004)	The Finger (2004)	Cavecraft (2008)

Professional ratings
Review scores
Source	Rating
PopMatters	(2/10)

The Finger is the fourth studio album by Babyland, released on October 18, 2004 by Dependent and Mattress Recordings. It was their first full-length album in six years.

== Track listing ==
All tracks are written by Babyland.

No.	Title	Length
1.	"Loss Leader"	2:23
2.	"Defeated"	5:21
3.	"Fast Space"	2:52
4.	"Past Lives"	3:31
5.	"Reno Machine"	4:10
6.	"Guard Dogs"	6:24
7.	"Nowadays"	3:59
8.	"Cabrini Manor"	3:50
9.	"Startled by the Obvious"	5:14
10.	"Nativity"	4:55
11.	"Gehry"	4:28
12.	"LMYA!"	4:33

== Personnel ==
Adapted from The Finger liner notes.

Babyland

- Dan Gatto – lead vocals, keyboards
- Michael Smith – percussion

Production and design

- Babyland – production, recording
- Giuliana Maresca – cover art, photography
- Shawn Porter – recording

== Release history ==
Region	Date	Label	Format	Catalog
United States	2004	Dependent	CD	mind 078
United States	2004	Mattress	CD	MAT010
