= Summer of Sam =

1999 US crime-drama film directed by Spike Lee

- Theatrical release poster
- Directed by: Spike Lee
- Written by: Victor Colicchio; Michael Imperioli; Spike Lee
- Produced by: Jon Kilik; Spike Lee
- Starring: John Leguizamo; Adrien Brody; Mira Sorvino; Jennifer Esposito; Anthony LaPaglia
- Cinematography: Ellen Kuras
- Edited by: Barry Alexander Brown
- Music by: Terence Blanchard
- Production companies: Touchstone Pictures; 40 Acres and a Mule Filmworks
- Distributed by: Buena Vista Pictures Distribution
- Release dates: May 20, 1999 (Cannes); July 2, 1999 (United States)
- Running time: 142 minutes
- Country: United States
- Languages: English; Italian
- Budget: $22 million
- Box office: $19.3 million

Summer of Sam is a 1999 American historical crime drama film directed and co-produced by Spike Lee, co-written by Lee, Michael Imperioli, and Victor Colicchio, and starring John Leguizamo, Adrien Brody, and Mira Sorvino, with Michael Rispoli, Bebe Neuwirth, Patti LuPone, Anthony LaPaglia, and Ben Gazzara appear in supporting roles. Set in the Bronx in 1977, the film follows a group of residents in an Italian-American neighborhood whose lives are impacted by the serial murders committed by David Berkowitz. The murder investigation and other contemporary events, such as the New York City blackout of 1977 and the New York Yankees' winning season, provide a backdrop to the narrative.

Principal photography of Summer of Sam took place in 1998 on location in the Bronx borough of New York City.

Summer of Sam premiered at Cannes on May 20, 1999 before being released by Buena Vista Pictures Distribution in the United States on July 2, 1999. The film was a box-office disappointment, grossing $19.3 million against a $22 million budget.

== Plot ==
It is the summer of 1977, and New York City lives in fear of the ".44 Caliber Killer", who shoots young women and their male companions. The killer, David Berkowitz, later identifies himself as "Son of Sam" in a note left at a murder scene. The deranged Berkowitz lives in a messy apartment, where he is driven mad by the barking of a neighbor's large black labrador, Harvey, the dog of Sam Carr, and has a hallucination of the dog directing him to kill.

In an Italian-American neighborhood in the Bronx, philandering hairdresser Vinny and his wife Dionna go disco dancing at a local nightclub, where they meet Dionna's attractive cousin Chiara. Vinny offers to drive Chiara home while Dionna remains at the club. Vinny and Chiara then park on a residential street and have sex in the car. Son of Sam watches them, but when another couple pulls up behind their car, flashing their lights and honking their horn, Vinny and Chiara drive off, embarrassed. After they leave, Son of Sam kills the couple who had parked behind Vinny. When Vinny picks up Dionna back at the club, she notices the smell of vaginal lubrication on his face and realizes he had sex with Chiara but does not let on that she knows.

On the drive home, Vinny notices police near the location where he had parked with Chiara and sees the bodies of the slain couple. The religious and guilty Vinny, realizing he could have been a victim, decides that God spared him in order to give him a chance to reform his ways and stop cheating on his wife. Although Vinny loves Dionna, their sex life is suffering because Vinny enjoys anal sex, "69,” and other sex acts that he considers kinky, but which he cannot bring himself to discuss or perform with his wife. He is also having an affair with Gloria, the owner of the hair salon where he works, while Dionna maintains employment at her father's restaurant.

The next day, while Vinny is hanging out with neighborhood drug dealer Joey T and his friends, Vinny's old friend Ritchie, who has been away for some time, reappears, sporting a punk spiked hairdo and clothing and affecting a British accent. Vinny, Joey T, and the others dislike the change in Ritchie and he soon finds himself unwelcome in the neighborhood. Ruby, a promiscuous local girl, is attracted to Ritchie and the two begin a relationship. Unlike other men, Ritchie takes an interest in Ruby as a person, not just as a sexual outlet. She learns that he makes money by erotic dancing and prostituting himself to men at a gay adult movie theater but remains loyal to him and begins to dress in punk fashion herself.

As the Son of Sam killings continue, tension rises in the neighborhood. A local police detective asks the local mob boss to help him find the killer; Joey T and his friends also make a list of possible suspects, including Ritchie whom they regard as "a freak". Ritchie and Ruby invite Vinny and Dionna to come see their punk band perform at CBGB, but once there, Dionna feels intimidated by the punk crowd and refuses to go in. Vinny and Dionna instead go to Studio 54, where they are denied entry and finally end up at Plato's Retreat where they take drugs and participate in an orgy. Vinny becomes upset when he sees Dionna appearing to enjoy the experience of having sex with another man, even though he himself is having sex with other women. He berates Dionna in the car on the way home, resulting in his angered wife revealing that she knows he cheated on her with Chiara. She storms off to stay at her father's house. Vinny begins to drink, uses drugs and makes a scene at Gloria's hair salon, causing her to angrily throw him out and then inform Dionna about their affair. Upon hearing from Gloria, Dionna leaves Vinny for good.

Joey T and his gang decide that the latest witness sketch of Son of Sam released by the police resembles Ritchie and attempt to track him down at CBGB. Joey persuades the unstable Vinny, who is high on drugs he has taken to dull the pain of his impending divorce, to help them lure Ritchie out of his house, since Vinny is the only local friend Ritchie still trusts. Unbeknownst to Vinny and his friends, the police have already arrested David Berkowitz, the real Son of Sam. Vinny goes to Ritchie's family home, where Ritchie and Ruby are packing up to leave town, and lures Ritchie out on the pretext of talking about his failing marriage. Once Ritchie is outside, Vinny warns Ritchie under his breath to run, but Ritchie does not heed the warning and is attacked and severely beaten by Joey T and his gang. Ritchie's stepfather, Eddie, emerges from the house brandishing his gun and rescues the badly injured Ritchie, telling the attackers that Ritchie is not the Son of Sam and that the TV news is reporting that the police have just arrested the real killer. Unable to face Ritchie, Vinny walks away.

== Cast ==
- John Leguizamo as Vinny, Dionna's unfaithful husband, who works as a hairdresser
- Adrien Brody as Ritchie, Vinny's childhood friend and Ruby's boyfriend, who has recently returned home and developed a punk lifestyle
- Mira Sorvino as Dionna, Vinny's wife, who grows frustrated with her husband's infidelity
- Jennifer Esposito as Ruby, Ritchie's girlfriend
- Michael Rispoli as Joey T, the neighborhood drug dealer and friend of Vinny
- Saverio Guerra as Woodstock, a friend of Vinny
- Brian Tarantina as Bobby Del Fiore, a flamboyantly gay associate of Vinny whose sexuality makes him the target of hostility and suspicion
- Al Palagonia as Anthony, a friend of Vinny
- Ken Garito as Brian, a friend of Vinny
- Bebe Neuwirth as Gloria, the owner of the salon where Vinny works
- Patti LuPone as Helen, Ritchie's mother
- Mike Starr as Eddie, Ritchie's stepfather
- Anthony LaPaglia as Detective Lou Petrocelli
- Roger Guenveur Smith as Detective Curt Atwater
- Ben Gazzara as Luigi, a mob boss
- Joe Lisi as Tony Olives
- James Reno as Crony
- Arthur Nascarella as Mario
- John Savage as Simon
- Jimmy Breslin as himself
- Michael Badalucco as David Berkowitz/Son of Sam, a serial killer terrorizing the residents of The Bronx
- Spike Lee as John Jeffries, a local news reporter
- Lucia Grillo as Chiara
- Michael Imperioli as Midnite
- Christopher Wynkoop as Sam Carr
- John Turturro as Voice of Harvey the Dog
- Kim Director as Dee
- Michael Sorvino as Bowler at Diner
- Peter Maloney as Detective Timothy Dowd
- Joie Lee as Interviewed Girl
- Phil Rizzuto as himself
- Reggie Jackson as himself

== Production ==
=== Development ===
The original screenplay for Summer of Sam was written by Victor Colicchio and Michael Imperioli. Initially, Spike Lee planned to only serve as an executive producer on the project, but was so impressed by the screenplay that he sought to direct the project. Lee performed rewrites of Colicchio and Imperioli's screenplay, resulting in all three receiving screenwriting credit. It marked Lee's first film to feature a predominately white cast. "The reason for me doing this film is because I love the script," said Lee. "It’s a great story, simple as that."

=== Casting ===
Spike Lee spent months trying to convince Leonardo DiCaprio to take the role of Ritchie. DiCaprio declined the role and Adrien Brody was cast as Ritchie. To prepare for the role as a punk rocker, Brody learned to play guitar.

Lee later stated the role of Dionna was originally written with Jennifer Esposito in mind. A cast reshuffle ended with Mira Sorvino as Dionna and Esposito as Ruby. Journalist Jimmy Breslin, to whom the real Son of Sam sent letters during the time of the murders, appears as himself introducing and closing the film. Phil Rizzuto appears in the film as the Yankees' broadcaster and boxer Evander Holyfield makes a brief appearance as a man in a riot.

=== Filming ===
The film was largely shot during the summer of 1998 and set in the Italian-American neighborhoods of Country Club, Morris Park and Throggs Neck sections of the Bronx, with some scenes filmed in Brownsville, Brooklyn. Although most of the Son of Sam murders actually took place in Queens, the double shooting that Vinny narrowly escapes has been called an accurate depiction of the April 1977 killing of Alexander Esau and Valentina Suriani in the Bronx. Marie's Beauty Lounge, the salon where Vinny works, was a real salon on Morris Park Avenue, between Williamsbridge Road and Bronxdale Avenue. The real CBGB club was also used; the band L.E.S. Stitches shown playing there was a contemporary punk band from New York's Lower East Side.

Adrien Brody's nose was broken during the climactic fight scene in which his character Ritchie is brutally beaten by his friends.

=== Post-production ===
The sex orgy scene at Plato's Retreat included more explicit shots in the original cut but was edited after the MPAA threatened the film with an "NC-17" rating.

== Soundtrack ==
Summer of Sam: Original Soundtrack

Soundtrack album by Various
- Released: June 29, 1999
- Recorded: 1971–1983
- Genres: Disco; rock
- Length: 56:21
- Label: Hollywood Records
- Producer: Spike Lee (exec.)

1. "Got to Give It Up – Marvin Gaye (6:02)
2. "Dancing Queen" – ABBA (3:49)
3. "Baba O'Riley" – The Who (5:09)
4. "Running Away" – Roy Ayers (3:12)
5. "Everybody Dance" – Chic (3:31)
6. "La Vie En rose" – Grace Jones (7:27)
7. "Let No Man Put Asunder" – First Choice (7:59)
8. "Fooled Around and Fell in Love" – Elvin Bishop (2:58)
9. "There But For the Grace of God Go I" – Machine (4:58)
10. "Best of My Love" – The Emotions (3:46)
11. "Dance with Me" – Peter Brown (3:50)
12. "Don't Leave Me This Way" – Thelma Houston (3:40)

== Release ==
Summer of Sam premiered at the Cannes Film Festival on May 20, 1999, and was released in the United States on July 2. The film premiered in the United Kingdom at the London Film Festival on November 12, 1999.

=== Home media ===
Buena Vista Home Entertainment released Summer of Sam on VHS and DVD in 2000. In 2018, Buena Vista released the film on Blu-ray as a double feature with Lee's Miracle at St. Anna. Kino Lorber issued a standalone Blu-ray edition on February 1, 2020.

== Reception ==
=== Box office ===
The film grossed $7.8 million in its opening weekend, ranking at eighth place at the box office. It dropped to number ten in its second weekend, grossing $3.4 million.

=== Critical response ===
Summer of Sam received mixed reviews from critics. On the review aggregator website Rotten Tomatoes, 50% of 104 critics' reviews are positive. The website's consensus reads: "Spike Lee offers intense visuals but his storytelling feels crowded and overambitious." Metacritic, which uses a weighted average, assigned the film a score of 67 out of 100, based on 27 critics, indicating "generally favorable" reviews. Audiences surveyed by CinemaScore gave the film an average grade of "D−" on an A+ to F scale.

Kenneth Turan of the Los Angeles Times stated "Lee is a powerful filmmaker who certainly knows how to have an impact on an audience, but those who survive his ministrations are likely to wonder if in this case the battle was worth the bruises". Todd McCarthy of Variety gave a positive review, writing the film "is the closest Lee has yet come to Scorsese territory." In the Chicago Sun-Times, Roger Ebert gave it three-and-a-half out of four stars and regarded the screenplay as more of "an analytical outsider's view" of provincial scapegoating rather than "the inside, autobiographical job of a Martin Scorsese film". He added Summer of Sam "vibrates with fear, guilt and lust", and that the film is "not about the killer, but about his victims—not those he murdered, but those whose overheated imaginations bloomed into a lynch mob mentality. There is a sequence near the end of the film that shows a side of human nature as ugly as it is familiar: the fever to find someone to blame and the need to blame someone who is different."

Peter Travers of Rolling Stone similarly praised the film's social commentary, writing, "this tenaciously gripping film is only marginally concerned with Berkowitz... It’s Lee’s ambition—only partly realized—to show how the killings combined with the heat, blackouts and looting, as well as sexual, racial and cultural tensions, to turn an Italian-American community in the Bronx against itself and all outsiders."

According to film academic R. Barton Palmer in 2011, Summer of Sam continues to be widely viewed as Spike Lee's most controversial film, "issuing a cynical appeal to trashy tastes", which has "prevented some critics from according it more than cursory consideration". Many critics objected to its handling of sexual themes, its pervasive street language, and "what some saw as [Lee's] bitterly negative and even defamatory representations of white ethnic culture".

=== Accolades ===
Award	Year	Category	Subject	Result	Ref.
ALMA Awards	2000	Outstanding Actor in a Feature Film	John Leguizamo	Nominated	
Black Reel Awards	2000	Best Film Soundtrack	Terence Blanchard	Nominated	
Black Reel Awards	2000	Theatrical - Best Director	Spike Lee	Nominated	
Stinkers Bad Movie Awards	2000	Worst Supporting Actor	Spike Lee	Nominated	
Valladolid International Film Festival	1999	Golden Spike	Spike Lee	Nominated	

=== Controversy ===
The film drew some criticism from the family on Donna Lauria, one of Berkowitz's victims, due to it being filmed near the Bronx neighborhood where her murder took place. Lee responded to criticisms of exploitation, stating:

You know, we understand the pain that they have felt for the last twenty plus years. No one can bring back their loved ones. But number one, this film is not just about David Berkowitz or the Son of Sam. It’s about that crazy summer. In no way, shape, or form do we exploit David Berkowitz or the victims in this film. We really can’t say more than that about those charges by the parents of those victims.
