= 4ft Fingers =

English punk rock band

- Origin: Cheltenham, Gloucestershire, England, UK
- Genres: Pop-punk, skate punk, melodic hardcore
- Years active: 1996 – present
- Labels: Golf Records; Not On Your Radio; Go-Kart Records
- Members: Rob Crebbin; Tom Saunders; Simon Bayliss; Bob Kilminster
- Past members: David Humphries; Jon Priestley; Jamie Oliver
- Website: www.4ftfingers.com

4ft Fingers (pronounced "four foot fingers") are an English punk rock band from Cheltenham, England, formed in 1996. They play very fast, melodic skate punk.

== History ==
4 ft Fingers were formed in Cheltenham in 1996, although they did not become known as the 4ft Fingers until 1998. Previous band names included Subterfudge, West Bay Trash and The Drones. The original band lineup in 1998 was Rob Crebbin (guitar and vocals), Tom Saunders (guitar and vocals), Andy White (bass and vocals) and Magic Dave Humphries (drums). Although at this stage Dougie AKA Kyle Douglas who later became the bass player for the band, was a regular on the scene, as he was close friends with the band and worked at Pizza Hut with Rob and Tom. The year of 1998 to 1999 also saw the band add Alexis 'Lex' Llewellyn-Porter (trumpet) and Beth Rose (saxophone) to the band to play on the track Hopeless Romantic.

The mid nineties was a time of a minor musical revolution in Cheltenham. This period saw a number of high profile punk bands play in Cheltenham at The Attic or the Axiom including Snuff, Mad Caddies, Goober Patrol, Capdown and King Prawn. 4ft Fingers were normally the support act. They also played regularly alongside Spunge, a local ska/punk Band from Tewkesbury, Gloucestershire.

Lead singer Rob Crebbin stated in an interview that the name comes from the fact he has large hands and had an old rubber bat toy which sat on top of his television – "the [other band members] used to say he had fingers like mine and someone said they're 4ft Fingers and so we went with that". In 2001 the band recorded and later released their debut album At Your Convenience on Jamdown Records, which was followed by a tour consisting of 140 gigs throughout the UK. This tour caught the attention of Golf Record and in 2002 the band signed to Golf Records.

The band's second album, From Hero To Zero, was released in September 2002. This was then followed by another tour which included 40 gigs in the UK lasting until December that year.

In 2003 the band set out on a number of tours, including one in Europe, some dates included playing with Dead Kennedys and The Damned. The band was later invited on another European tour, this time with Voodoo Glow Skulls and Skindred starting in November and lasting for a total of six weeks.

In 2004 4 ft Fingers' third album was recorded. A Cause For Concern was released in the UK during April to coincide with the band's UK and European headline tour during April and May. The album was later released in the USA on Go-Kart Records which led up to the band's first US tour in the Summer. At the end of 2004, Dougie departed from 4 ft Fingers. He was replaced by Russ Carlin. However, two years later Dougie rejoined along with new guitarist Jon Priestley (who replaced former band member Tom Saunders). The band then began writing new material, and on 18 June 2008, released their fourth full-length album, New Beginnings of Old Stories. Preceding this was a big promotional campaign which started on 22 February and lasted until 31 May, with the band playing a total of 34 gigs throughout the UK.

In October 2012, 4ft Fingers went back on the road for seven UK shows as a "Last Man Standing Tour" with U.K. Subs drummer Jamie Oliver jumping in after Dave had decided to pursue other ventures.

In 2017, they 'got the band back together' and Dave came back in the fold. The problem was that Dougie had since moved to Australia so a new bassist needed to be found. It was an easy search as the band had remained friends with Simon Bayliss who had played many gigs with them in other bands (Spunge, Whippasnappa) and a quick call and an even quicker 'Fuck yeah' the lineup was set.

After a couple of false starts including the impact of Covid slowing things down the band road-mapped the route to the new album and subsequent live shows. During this period they recorded a 30-second song about the impact of Covid. It was recorded in each individuals house, as was the subsequent video which can be found on YouTube named 'Can't wait'... In this time frame, by a quirk of fate, Dave Humphries left the band to join the U.K. Subs and the former U.K. Subs drummer (one Jamie Oliver, joined, again).

== Band members ==
- Rob Crebbin– vocals / guitar
- Tom Saunders – vocals / guitar
- Simon Bayliss - vocals / bass guitar
- Bob Kilminster – drums

== Discography ==
=== Albums ===
- 2001: At Your Convenience
- 2002: From Hero To Zero
- 2004: A Cause For Concern
- 2008: New Beginnings of Old Stories

=== Extended plays ===
- 1999: How's My Driving?
- 2004: 40 Years of Misery
