= Toilet Böys (album) =

Studio album by Toilet Böys
- Released: September 11, 2001
- Recorded: Taboo NYC
- Genre: punk / Go-Go Rock
- Label: Masterplan Entertainment
- Producer: Sean Pierce

Toilet Böys chronology
| Sinners and Saints (1999) | Toilet Böys (2001) |

Professional ratings
Review scores
| Source | Rating |
|---|---|
| Allmusic | 4.5/5 stars |

Toilet Böys is the most recent studio album by the NYC punk band, the Toilet Böys. A reviewer best described the album as the following;

"Images of cocaine, blowjobs, out-of-control parties, and a confident, stylish band on stage hammering away, carrying on the CBGB's New York rock torch come to mind when The Toilet Boys' self-titled full-length blares on my stereo."

According to lead-guitarist Sean, due to limited studio time, this album had a much more 'poppy' sound as opposed to their older, crunchier albums. He attributed this to the album's extensive use of Pro Tools.

== Track listing ==
1. Party Starts Now 3:28
2. Heartstopper 3:15
3. Can't Wait 2:55
4. Future Is Now 3:45
5. Saturday Nite 2:53
6. Hollywood 5:20
7. Runaway 2:27
8. Ride 3:44
9. Another Day in the Life 3:30
10. Good Times Roll 3:20
11. Blue Halo 3:18
12. Rock 'N' Roll Whore 3:27
13. Kiss in the Wind 4:47
14. Feels Good 5:07 (hidden track)
15. Original Sinner (Japanese bonus track)
