= Theo and the Skyscrapers (album) =

Studio album by Theo & the Skyscrapers
- Released: 2006
- Genre: Electronic

Theo & the Skyscrapers chronology
| Theo and the Skyscrapers (2006) | So Many Ways To Die (2007) |

Theo and the Skyscrapers is the first album by Theo & the Skyscrapers. It was released March 28, 2006 by Ozit Morpheus. The songs are reminiscent of Blondie. The album includes a bonus DVD with videos of "Run Rabbit Run," "Time," "Broken Girl," and others, which features the work of photographer, Rob Roth.

== Track listing ==
1. "Doppelganger Death Disco"
2. "Say it Again"
3. "First Bleach"
4. "Lay'em Out"
5. "Red Shoes"
6. "Down the Hole"
7. "End of Time"
8. "Volcano"
9. "Unravelled"
10. "Broken Girl"
11. "Not Alone"
