= 1991 (Babyland EP) =

EP by Babyland
- Released: January 1991
- Recorded: December 1990 – January 1991
- Genre: Industrial rock
- Label: Flipside

Dan Gatto chronology
1991 (1991)	You Suck Crap (1992)

1991 is the debut EP of Babyland, released in January 1991 by Flipside.

== Track listing ==
All tracks are written by Dan Gatto and Michael Smith.

Side one
No.	Title	Length
1.	"Mask"
2.	"Logan's Run"

Side two
No.	Title	Length
1.	"Motor.Tool.Appliance."
2.	"Mindfuck"

== Personnel ==
Adapted from the Babyland liner notes.

Babyland

- Dan Gatto – lead vocals, keyboards
- Michael Smith – percussion

Production and design

- Andrew Growcott (as Stoker) – recording, engineering
- John Wizner – cover art, illustrations, photography

== Release history ==
Region	Date	Label	Format	Catalog
United States	1991	Flipside	LP	FLIP 32
