= Hyphen (disambiguation) =

The hyphen is a punctuation mark.

Hyphen may also refer to:

- Hyphen-minus (-), one computer character encoding for the mark
- Hyphen (magazine), an Asian-American magazine, URL hyphenmagazine.com; not to be confused with the UK website, hyphenonline.com
- Hyphen (fanzine), a science fiction fanzine
- Hyphen (architecture), an architectural element
- Hyphen (architects), a firm of architects
- Ryan Rowland-Smith, a pitcher for the Houston Astros of Major League Baseball whose nickname is Hyphen
- Sheldon-Primghar Hyphens, an Iowa minor league baseball team in the 1902 and 1903 seasons

== See also ==
- De-hyphenation, a process of disentangling international relations
