= Black Velvet Flag =

- Origin: New York City
- Genres: Lounge, comedy music
- Labels: Go-Kart
- Past members: Jeff Musser; Fred Stesney; Jason Zasky

Black Velvet Flag was a New York City-based comedy music trio, known for their humorous, lounge-styled covers of songs by Southern California punk rock bands, and for performing while wearing tuxedos. They became known in 1994, after performing on the New York music scene, which suddenly propelled them to fame in just six months. Their only full-length album, Come Recline, was released in 1995 on Go-Kart Records. In 2003, an interactive documentary of the band, entitled The Rise and Fall of Black Velvet Flag, was released; it was directed by Sheldon Schiffer.

== Reception ==
Black Velvet Flag was named the best unsigned band of 1994 by Rolling Stone's poll of music critics. AllMusic's Jack Rabid called the album "One of the funniest records released this year." In the Washington Post, Mark Jenkins wrote of the band's act of covering punk songs in a lounge style that "...this is a joke that doesn't need to be told more than once." Trouser Press's David Sprague concluded that the album "...falls somewhere between Dread Zeppelin feebdom and a '90s approximation of Frank Sinatra's late-'60s hipster era, during which Ol' Blue Eyes tried his best to bask in the glow of the summer of love—not that either assessment will keep Black Velvet Flag from the next century's thrift store bargain bins." Chris Norris of New York was also critical of the band's style, writing that their "hardcore-as-lounge gag" was "funny for about twenty seconds and only if you've never seen Repo Man," in which Los Angeles punk band Circle Jerks appears as a lounge band.

== Discography ==
- Come Recline (Go-Kart, 1994)
- Go-Kart vs. the Corporate Giant; Volume #1 (Go-Kart, 1996)
