= Sinners and Saints (album) =

EP by Toilet Böys
- Released: 05/07/1999
- Recorded: March 1999 @ Loho Studios, NYC
- Genre: Laser punk / Go-Go Rock
- Label: Coldfront Records
- Producer: Sean Pierce

Toilet Böys chronology
Living Like a Millionaire (1998)	Sinners and Saints (1999)	Toilet Böys (2001)

Professional ratings
Review scores
Source	Rating
Allmusic	2/5 stars

Sinners and Saints is the third release by New York-based punk/glam rock band Toilet Böys.

== Track listing ==
1. PHLY 2000 (2:04)
2. Special (2:57)
3. Blue Halo (3:31)
4. Do or Die (3:17)
5. Influence (2:59)
6. Ride (3:00)
7. Untitled (:24)
8. Untitled (:25)
9. Fairies Wear Boots (Black Sabbath cover) (5:41)
