= A Total Letdown =

Studio album by Babyland
- Released: March 4, 1994
- Studio: The Bunker (Los Angeles, California); Wireworks (Rosemead, California)
- Genre: Industrial rock; synth punk
- Length: 43:20
- Label: Flipside

Dan Gatto chronology
The Dogsnatcher EP (1993)	A Total Letdown (1994)	Who's Sorry Now? (1995)

A Total Letdown is the second studio album by Babyland, released on March 4, 1994, by Flipside Records.

== Reception ==
Professional ratings
Review scores
Source	Rating
AllMusic	4.5/5 stars

Ned Raggett of AllMusic says, "Babyland continue the same perfect bland of aggro-electronics, personal/political punk lyrical delivery" and "the few changes there are turn up as understated rather than obvious, especially a continued embrace of careful additional touches to flesh out the songs." Alternative Press also lauded the album, saying "the band literally hit the nail on the head of all the confusion, resentment, anger, and frustration felt by an entire generation."

== Track listing ==
All tracks are written by Dan Gatto and Michael Smith, except "Pink Frost" by Martin Phillips.

No.	Title	Length
1.	"Plain Talk"	4:32
2.	"Worst Case Scenario"	4:42
3.	"Dismissal"	4:31
4.	"Pink Frost" (The Chills cover)	3:28
5.	"Cop-Out"	2:17
6.	"(De)Pressing Plant"	4:38
7.	"The Next Day in the Course of Time"	2:45
8.	"Ramona Moraga"	3:19
9.	"Stomach"	2:15
10.	"Kill Bugs"	3:31
11.	"Suitable for Framing"	7:23

== Personnel ==
Adapted from the A Total Letdown liner notes.

Babyland

- Dan Gatto – lead vocals, keyboards
- Michael Smith – percussion

Production and design

- Aartvark – cover art, photography
- Rusty Cusick – engineering (2, 4, 5, 7, 9, 10)
- Jon Steinhoff – engineering (1, 3, 6, 8, 11)

== Release history ==
Region	Date	Label	Format	Catalog
United States	1994	Flipside	CD, CS	FLIP 57
United States	1999	Mattress	CD	MAT004
