= Continues (album) =

Studio album by Continues
- Released: May 1, 2012
- Studios: The Lair (Los Angeles, California)
- Genre: Synthpop
- Length: 43:04
- Label: Mattress

Dan Gatto chronology
| Not Modern (2008) | Continues (2012) | LIVE EXECUTION (2013) |

Continues is the debut studio album of Continues, released on May 1, 2012 by Mattress Recordings. Composer Dan Gatto wanted to take his music in a synthpop direction similar to what he had been influenced by as a teenager.

== Reception ==
Brutal Resonance awarded Continues a nine out of ten, calling it "all beautifully performed and put together" and "a deft approach in Synthpop with a Minimal undertone to it."

== Track listing ==
All tracks are written by Dan Gatto.

| No. | Title | Length |
|---|---|---|
| 1. | "Lost Life" | 4:07 |
| 2. | "Reckless Heart" | 4:43 |
| 3. | "Reception" | 4:34 |
| 4. | "New Saint" | 4:45 |
| 5. | "After All" | 5:37 |
| 6. | "Love on the Run" | 3:13 |
| 7. | "Spent Time" | 3:18 |
| 8. | "September" | 4:04 |
| 9. | "Flat Black" | 3:52 |
| 10. | "Sundown" | 4:51 |

== Personnel ==
Adapted from the Continues liner notes.

Mentallo & The Fixer

- Dan Gatto – vocals, instruments

Production and design

- Jean Béraud – cover art, illustrations
- Larry Goetz – recording, mixing

== Release history ==
| Region | Date | Label | Format | Catalog |
|---|---|---|---|---|
| United States | 2012 | Mattress | CD, DL | MAT017 |
