= Hyphen (architects) =

British architectural firm

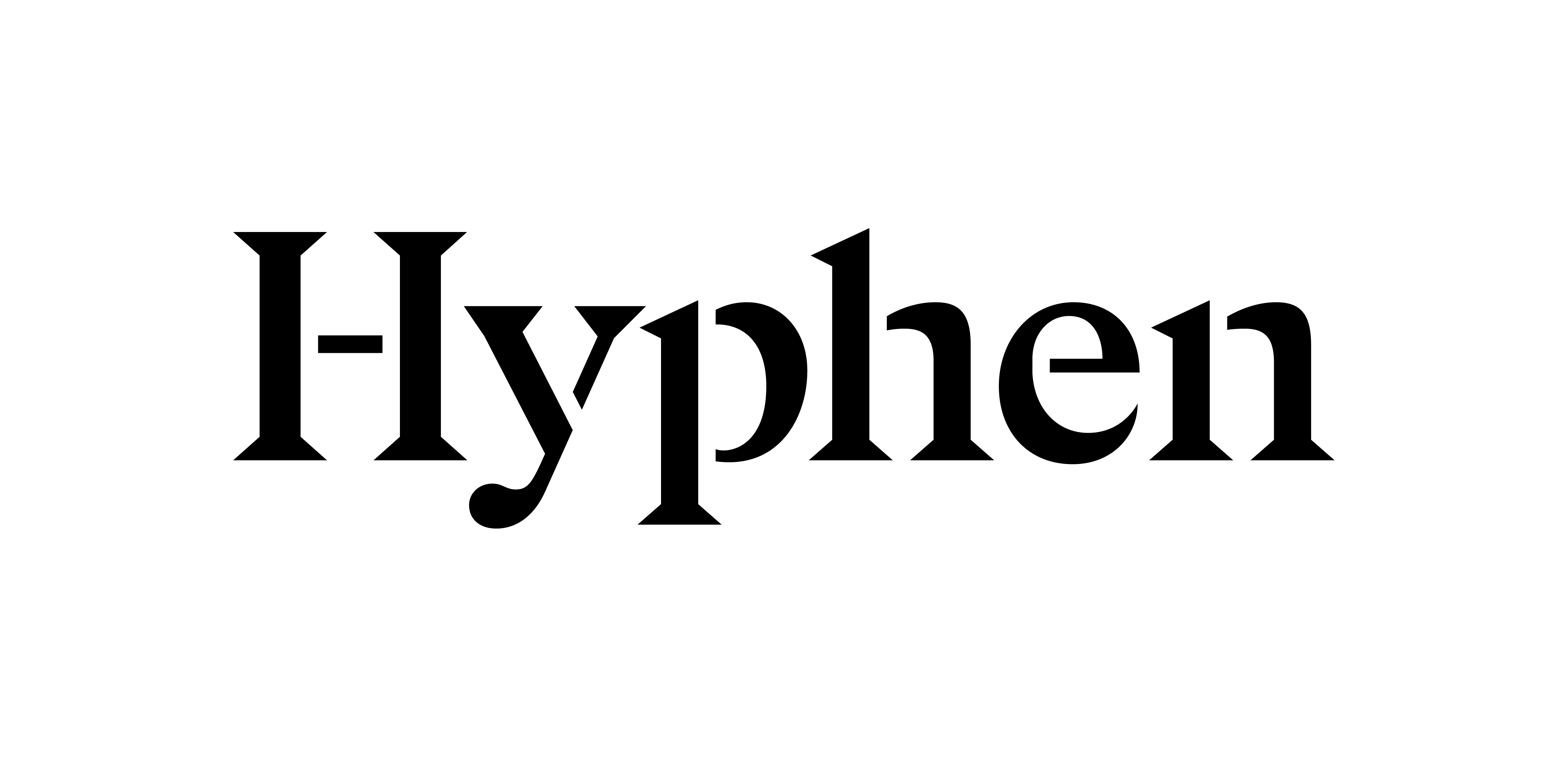
- Type: Architecture
- Industry: Architecture
- Founded: 1980
- Headquarters: Winchester, UK
- Area served: Worldwide
- Key people: Eva Diego Garcia (CEO)
- Number of employees: 250+ (2025)
- Divisions: London, Winchester, Dublin, Paris, Berlin, Madrid, Santiago de Chile, Milan, Mexico City, Belfast, Adelaide and Mumbai
- Website: Official website

Hyphen is a multi-national architectural advisory practice with offices in Europe, Asia Pacific and Latin America. The company works across a range of sectors including retail, workplace, data centers, logistics, hospitality and mixed-use.

== History ==
Hyphen was established in 1980, opening its first office in Winchester, UK. Originally named Househam Henderson, the firm started expanding in the early nineties and now operates 12 offices in cities across Europe, Asia Pacific and Latin America.

In late 2017, the company was rebranded as Hyphen. Pentagram created Hyphen's identity using a stencilled-alphabet and a simple color scheme highlighted by neon green, for a distinctive brand look.

In March 2019, Hyphen collaborated with Lush's in-house design team and Portview to transform a space into the world's largest Lush store in Liverpool.

In 2021, the company opened a new office in Belfast, citing dual market access, particularly in retail and logistics.

In 2022, Hyphen and Trinity Winchester, Ridge LLP, and Bentley Projects were awarded the Property Week's RESI Award in the "Health and Wellbeing Initiative – Residential" category for Bradbury View residential.

In 2023, the company opened an office in Mexico City. Since that year, Hyphen has been included in each edition of Building Design's WA100 list of the world's largest practices and in the Architects' Journal's AJ100 list.

In 2025, Hyphen and Elea Data Centers won a World Architecture Festival award in the Digital Worlds category, for sustainability in digital infrastructure. In the same year, the practice opened an office in Adelaide, Australia.

In 2026, Eva Diego was appointed chief executive officer, making Hyphen one of seven female-led practices in the WA100 long list. Eva has published industry articles on retrofitting and the role of the architect at stage 0. The multi-national practice also opened its 12th office in 2026, in Mumbai, India.
