= So Many Ways to Die =

Studio album by Theo & the Skyscrapers
- Released: 2007
- Genre: Electronic
- Label: Dark Daddy Records

Theo & the Skyscrapers chronology
Theo and the Skyscrapers (2006)	So Many Ways to Die (2007)

So Many Ways to Die is the second album by Theo & the Skyscrapers. It was released July 7, 2007 on the band's label, Dark Daddy Records. The album is a mix of electronic and dark dance.

== Track list ==
1. "Good Mourning"
2. "Tease"
3. "Jealousy Died"
4. "Ghost"
5. "City of the Witch"
6. "So Many Ways to Die"
7. "Big Britches"
8. "Those Days"
9. "Spider"
10. "Face the Music"
11. "Already Dead"
12. "New York"
