= Victor Colicchio =

Actor and screenwriter

- Born: August 13, 1953 (age 73)

Victor Colicchio (born August 13, 1953) is an actor and screenwriter. His screenwriting credits include Summer of Sam, co-written with actor Michael Imperioli and director Spike Lee, and High Times' Potluck co-written with Nicholas Iacovino. As an actor his credits include Inside Man, The Brave One, Goodfellas, The Deli, Bullets over Broadway, The Sopranos, and five episodes of Law & Order. He also played Slick Rick in New York Undercover.

== Bibliography ==
- Summer of Sam (1999, script writer)
- High Times' Potluck (2002, script writer)

== Filmography ==
=== Films ===
- Through the Looking Glass (1976, as Pretty Boy)
- Blowdry (1976, as Warren Peace)
- French-Teen (1977, uncredited)
- Inside Jennifer Welles (1977, as Burt Hanson)
- Joint Venture (1977, uncredited)
- Honeymoon Haven (1977, as Jack)
- High School Bunnies (1978, as Joe White)
- Chorus Call (1978, as Jody)
- Fiona on Fire (1978, as Ronald)
- Daughters of Discipline (1978, as Bob)
- Blonde Ambition (1981, uncredited)
- Delivery Boys (1985, as Tony)
- Crocodile Dundee II (1988, as Sanchez, Rico's driver)
- The Luckiest Man in the World (1989, as 1st Hood)
- Q & A (1990, as 'After Hours' Luis Alvarado)
- Street Hunter (1990, as Mustache Diablo)
- Goodfellas (1990, as Henry's '60s crew #2)
- True Identity (1991, as Alley Guy #2)
- Men Lie (1994, as Ring Man)
- Bullets Over Broadway (1994, as Waterfront Hood)
- Sweet Nothing (1995, as Armed Bodyguard)
- The Keeper (1995, as Officer Corvino)
- West New York (1996, as Berto)
- Arresting Gena (1997, as Gordie)
- Loose Women (1997, as George)
- The Deli (1997, as Micky)
- Better Than Ever (1997, as Hopper)
- Celebrity (1998, as Moving Man in Loft)
- Exiled: A Law & Order Movie (1998, as Elaine's Waiter)
- Summer of Sam (1999, as Chickie)
- For Love of the Game (1999, as Heckler)
- Friends and Family (2001, as Sammy)
- High Times' Potluck (2002, as Vic)
- Four Deadly Reasons (2002, as Chickie)
- Tinsel Town (2005, as Tough Guy)
- Inside Man (2006, as Sergeant Collins)
- Mattie Fresno and the Holoflux Universe (2007, as Janitor / Devil)
- The Brave One (2007, as Cutler)
- Motherhood (2009, as Roofer in Truck)
- Chinese Puzzle (2013, as Le deuxième avocat)
- Laugh Killer Laugh (2015, as Tough Tony)
- The Networker (2015, as Robert)
- Sam (2017, as The Barfly)
- American Fango (2017, as Pino)
- BlacKkKlansman (2018, as Steve)
- Sarah Q (2018, as The Guy)
- The Brawler (2019, as Doctor Mancini, uncredited)
- Long Shot Louie (2023, as Pete Lazzaro)
- Watergate's Secrets and Betrayals (2024, as Judge John Sirica)
- Death Border (2026, as Ronnie)

=== Television ===
- New York Undercover (1994-1995 as Slick Rick)
- The Sopranos (1999, as Joe, 1 episode)
- The Beat (2000, as Super, 1 episode)
- Prince Street (2000, 2 episodes)
- Third Watch (2000-2001, as Howell, 2 episodes)
- Law & Order: Criminal Intent (2002, as Building Manager)
- Law & Order: Special Victims Unit (2003, as Bartender)
- Law & Order (1991-2008, 4 episodes)
- The Unusuals (2009, as Lowdown Pat, 1 episode)
- In the Life with Steve Stanulis (2013, as himself, 1 episode)
- Crash the System (2025, as Jesse Simms, 1 episode)
