= Edley ODowd =

American drummer

Edley ODowd is a New York-based graphic designer, musician and typographer. ODowd was a member of British band Psychic TV 3 since 2003, as the drummer and designer who created all the band's album covers, records, posters, books, apparel and branding for the group, led by Genesis P-Orridge. As one of Genesis P-Orridge's closest confidants, he carries on the band's legacy through books, art exhibitions and public lectures.

As an artist and designer, he has designed books, album covers and exhibitions, with the most recent one at Lethal Amounts Gallery in Los Angeles in 2017 entitled Discipline: The Art Of Psychic TV, 2003 – 2016.

ODowd introduced Genesis P-Orridge to h/er wife Lady Jaye Breyer P-Orridge in 1995.

== Biography ==
ODowd graduated from Purchase College in New York and has worked since 1997 on music design and has taught graphic design as a professor at Purchase College, as well as Parsons School of Design in New York, festivals like South By Southwest and museums like the Rubin Museum of Art in New York.

In 2003, ODowd urged P-Orridge to rekindle her desire to perform and create music as Psychic TV. It led to the duo collaborating for the next 14 years as Psychic TV. ODowd is also a DJ.

As a designer, ODowd's music packaging design influences include Neville Brody, Vaughan Oliver and Peter Saville. "Having been trained in graphic design in an age where computers were new and considered an additional tool, rather than the only tool, when I entered the workforce, I only knew the basics of one program and 80% of the work was still done by hand," he said.

== Exhibitions ==
His book "Discipline: The Art of Psychic TV: 2003 – 2016' was published in 2017, showcasing all the artwork from Psychic TV from 2003 until 2016 with a foreword written by Genesis P-Orridge. Genesis P-Orridge once called ODowd's design work a "fastidious methodology" and "working his magic on anything and everything that might add to the unique cascade of original, ever-more-groundbreaking combinations."

ODowd's design work explores the relationship between iconography, pattern and design. "I think that design is a conduit for creating a powerful cultural shift and over the years I have been creating works that grow and evolve as we evolve; a memetic spiral outward from the place where it all began. It's matching this concept of design and graphic repetition to a kind of religious rite. It's sacred art on many levels," said ODowd. "It's more than just creating an image, as this repetition gives power to a symbol, to an idea. I want to explore the application of pattern and graphic to everyday objects."

== Filmography ==
ODowd stars as a subject in the biopic The Ballad of Genesis and Lady Jaye, a 2011 film directed by Marie Losier, which won a Teddy Award for Best Documentary.
