= Sex Music (album) =

Toilet Böys: Sex Music

Compilation album by Toilet Böys
- Released: November 13, 2007
- Genre: Laser punk / go-go rock
- Label: Dead City Records

Sex Music is a compilation album by New York-based punk rock band Toilet Böys. The songs found on the album were written and recorded before the Toilet Böys' final tour with the Red Hot Chili Peppers, started on 23 January 2003. This album also includes one new track ("Drug of Choice") recorded by the three remaining members of the band Sean, Guy and Electric Eddie and a remix by each of them.

== Track listing ==
1. Sex Music
2. Nothing to Lose
3. Gimme Everything
4. Astrological
5. Gods and Monsters
6. Carbona Not Glue (Ramones cover)
7. Drug of Choice
8. Let's Do It Again
9. XXX Music (The Cult of Sean Pierce Remix)
10. Nothing to Lose (Miss Guy Loves Daddy mix)
11. Drug of Choice (Electric Eddie Meets Bryin Dall Remix)
