= High Times' Potluck =

- DVD cover
- Directed by: Alison Thompson
- Written by: Victor Colicchio; Nicholas Iacovino
- Starring: Frank Adonis; Theo Kogan; Charles Malik Whitfield; Sylvia Miles; Nicholas Iacovino; Jason Mewes; Jackie Martling; Dan Lauria; Tommy Chong
- Release date: August 15, 2002
- Running time: 90 minutes
- Country: United States
- Language: English

High Times' Potluck is a 2002 comedy film by High Times that revolves around a mobster in Manhattan who discovers the magic of marijuana.

This comedy follows a suitcase of high-grade marijuana from the farm where it was grown, to its eventual distribution in New York. Along the way the weed passes through the hands of an obnoxious artist (Jason Isaacs), an unfortunate small-time dealer (Jason Mewes), a bereaved Mafia gangster (Frank Adonis), the lead-singer of a punk band (Theo Kogan) and an aging TV detective (Frank Gorshin). This uneven tale of murder, deception, and romance sees a bizarre assortment of characters drawn together, as various plots and sub-plots interweave, culminating in a showdown at a "Reefer Rally".

The film won the Audience Award for "Best Feature Film" at New York International Independent Film Festival, and "Best Comedy" at the Atlantic City Film Festival.

According to Box Office Mojo, it grossed just $3,168 on its opening weekend and $4,827 total.

== Plot ==
Frank (Frank Adonis) is a pot luck mobster that is finding the good and protecting Jade (Theo Kogan) is finding a way in and then finds the Slim Man who is a small-time criminal Frank kills him to blame that consequence Hw drives to the house. checks inside and looks for his book on the bed. He heads to the car and takes Jade to a warehouse. At the warehouse, Frank is telling Jade a story to know it's another thing that is saying it's right and then Frank goes to the place and finds the Barbeque place and then finds Saki and then Jade takes Saki to the warehouse and then she walks inside and then Frank thanks her.

Frank goes to the subway station and meets Ma and then she gets off the train to meet Frank and keeps it busy so that she knows and then Frank takes her to a warehouse to interrupt a story about it. At the game store Frank stops by and then Jade agrees with him by being interested in an answer to cross a border that's there and then crosses it and finds Edie and then he is good and then Frank takes him to Jade to keep him safe. Frank is agreeing to Jade about the story and then Frank and Jade drives to an apartment and walks inside and finds a room and then finds Jack who is bad and then Frank kills Jack a gangster kid for trying to get Frank killed and then leaves the apartment.

Frank and Jade obtain Jade's car and then Frank drives away and drives to the harbor and then talks to Jim about the story and then Frank takes Jade's car into the garage and stores it inside. Jade talks to Ma and then she gives it the answer and then Jade takes Ma to Malik and then Malik is interested about getting the answer right and keeps it there and then Frank and Ma take Malik to a fire station to keep an app. Frank interrupts Ma's story about the idea what he is saying and then Malik finds a bad guy named Rigano and then Frank kills him and leaves him for dead and then gets away from his area and leaves him dead behind. Frank tells Ma it's a secret to say and agree and then Frank and Ma and Jade get the answer in a way right and then do not restrain it and then Frank finds David Peele and then tells him to move quickly and fast and say the answer. Frank and Ma drives to a Cinemas and finds Vic who is a helper and then Frank and Ma takes Vic to a room where he is safe and then Vic thanks them. Frank and Man drives to a cargo ship to meet Mickey and then Mickey who is the bad guy gets off the boat and then goes in a meeting with him about it and then he is taken to the high level. At the high level apartment Frank walks in Mickey's apartment and talks to Mickey and then says I have an answer to agree to and then answers it and then says yes and then Frank goes to the wood house and finds Ryan who is a sinister and then Frank kills him and leaves him for dead and then leaves the area to give Frank the answer to identify that Ryan is bad.

Frank says to Mickey that it will be a time of life and then walks to Ma and Jade and Malik about the answer that it's going to be and then finds Arneau who is good and then Frank says that Ma's boyfriend is Arneau and then Mickey tries to search and then they move away. Frank tells Mickey that he will interrogate him and then a good kid named Young Saki moves and then a bad guy named Benny arrives and then Frank beats up Benny and then kills him and then leaves him be. During a story, Frank is told by Ma and then Malik walks up to talk to something about the story to get the answer complete and then they complete it. Frank takes Ma up to Champaigne Sally to know it's ok and then they complete the story together with Ma and then answers it right and walks back in. During a road trip, Frank takes Ma up on the road by giving Jane the answer and then they talk and then checks out the trip and then returns to the car.

During a walk, Frank follows Jade to Mario and gives the true story some details and has it gifted to Mario and then answers it while they subdue it. Frank tells Jade to stay outside and then Frank walks inside to close the door while meeting Young Slim Man and then he says go in and then he leaves and then he goes inside and then looks inside and finds Congressman and then he says I need to be clear of something and then Frank agrees and then meets Cool J and Mercury and Tommy Chong to agree with the answer about planning and then they say yes. Frank tells Cool J and Mercury and Tommy Chong to stay at the wall near the closet and then Frank goes up to the door and then looks for Liberty and tells her yes and then she agrees and leaves and then she runs to the sidewalk while Mickey looks for them. During a walk in Frank and Cool J and Mercury and Tommy Chong have societies in there self and then tells them to answer the whole story and then Mickey stares at him like he is crazy and then a bad guy Joey and then he pulls out a gun telling him leave and then Frank whacks him on the head with a bat killing him and then Frank gets to them. At the fight Frank and Cool J and Mercury and Tommy Chong need society and then Mickey tries to kill them but they hide for cover and then they have Ticket Counter behind them and then Mickey kills him and then they scream help. During the escape, Frank and Cool J and Mercury and Tommy try to get away from Mickey and they run through the side door to escape in and then they leave that area and then heads to a car and then makes the escape in the 20 miles ahead.
