= Cavecraft =

Studio album by Babyland
- Released: September 19, 2008
- Recorded: March–September 2008
- Studio: The Lair Studio (Los Angeles, CA)
- Genre: Industrial rock, synth punk
- Length: 47:51
- Label: Mattress
- Producer: Larry Goetz

Dan Gatto chronology
The Finger (2004)	Cavecraft (2008)	Not Modern (2008)

Cavecraft is the fifth and final studio album by American punk band Babyland, released on September 19, 2008 by Mattress Recordings.

== Track listing ==
All tracks are written by Babyland.

No.	Title	Length
1.	"Last Ave."	3:12
2.	"You Will Never Have It"	3:17
3.	"Rimer Drive Tiger"	2:54
4.	"Subtraction"	6:05
5.	"Low Relics"	6:10
6.	"Lifestyle"	3:35
7.	"The Stumble"	5:23
8.	"Con Sequences"	2:24
9.	"The End of All Summers"	3:43
10.	"Search and Rescue"	3:53
11.	"A Graduation"	7:15

== Personnel ==
Adapted from the Cavecraft liner notes.

Babyland

- Dan Gatto – lead vocals, keyboards, programming
- Michael Smith – percussion, programming

Production and design

- Babyland – production, mixing
- Giuliana Maresca – cover art, photography
- Larry Goetz – production, recording, mastering

== Release history ==
Region	Date	Label	Format	Catalog
United States	2008	Mattress	CD	
United States	2009	Metropolis	CD	MET 573
