= Who's Sorry Now? (Babyland album) =

Studio album by Babyland
- Released: November 10, 1995
- Recorded: February–July 1995
- Genre: Industrial rock; synth punk
- Length: 49:14
- Label: Flipside
- Producer: Dan Gatto; Tom Grimley; Michael Smith

Dan Gatto chronology
A Total Letdown (1994)	Who's Sorry Now? (1995)	Outlive Your Enemies (1998)

Who's Sorry Now? is the third studio album by Babyland, released on November 10, 1995 by Flipside Records.

== Reception ==
Professional ratings
Review scores
Source	Rating
AllMusic	4/5 stars

Ned Raggett of AllMusic says "Babyland kicks in its third release very much following its established path from previous releases, but not shirking from tweaks and changes that Dan and Smith find them necessary." The critic went on to say "the duo's musical relationship was perhaps even stronger than before, bolstered by the years of performing together, which resulted in some fascinating, gripping new songs." Black Monday praised the album for showcasing the band's artistic growth and said "Babyland's style successfully blends elements of punk, techno, industrial/noise, and now even a little hip hop." Sonic Boom gave the album a mixed reception and said "audience ends up feeling restricted by the single channel of exchange and much of the message is lost in the translation."

== Track listing ==
All tracks are written by Dan Gatto and Michael Smith.

No.	Title	Length
1.	"Lukewarm"	3:21
2.	"A Slow News Day"	3:11
3.	"Happy Drum"	5:25
4.	"He Will Not Forgive"	5:41
5.	"Form 95B"	6:37
6.	"The Door Northern"	5:38
7.	"We Don't Know"	4:52
8.	"Cancer Beat"	5:06
9.	"Begin Again"	9:23

== Personnel ==
Adapted from the Who's Sorry Now? liner notes.

Babyland

- Dan Gatto – lead vocals, keyboards, production
- Michael Smith – percussion, production

Production and design

- Aartvark – cover art, photography
- Tom Grimley – production
- Stephen Marcussen – mastering

== Release history ==
Region	Date	Label	Format	Catalog
United States	1995	Flipside	CD	FLIP 87
United States	1995	Mattress	CD	MAT005
