= Lisa Rose Apramian =

American filmmaker

- Լիզա րոզ Աբրամիյան
- Education: University of Southern California
- Occupations: Filmmaker, director, producer
- Notable work: Not Bad for a Girl
- Awards: Best Documentary at the New York Underground Film Festival in 1996

Lisa Rose Apramian (Armenian: Լիզա րոզ Աբրամիյան), also known as Dr. Lisa, is an Armenian-American psychologist and filmmaker most notable as the director, writer, and producer of the documentary film Not Bad for a Girl.

== Career ==
Apramian studied at the University of Southern California where she received a B.S. in psychology, a B.S. in Critical Gender Studies, and an M.S. and Ph.D. in Counseling Psychology and phenomenology.

Apramian served as a psychological consultant for the 1994 Rafal Zielinski film Fun which received two special Jury awards from the Sundance Film Festival.

== See also ==
- List of female film and television directors
