= Toilet Böys =

American rock and roll band

- Origin: New York City, United States
- Genres: Punk rock, hard rock, glam rock
- Years active: 1995–2003, 2010 2019-Present
- Labels: RAFR; Roadrunner Records; Masterplan Entertainment; Hall of Records; Ozit/Morpheus Records; Coldfront Records; Lookout! Records; Devil Doll Records; Cargo Records; Dead City Records
- Members: Miss Guy; Sean Pierce; Rocket; Adam Vomit; Electric Eddie
- Past members: Paul Rocks; Jimmy Grillo; Oliver Miller; Mike Rubio
- Website: www.toiletböys.com (former site); Official MySpace page

Toilet Böys are an American rock and roll band from New York City, United States. The band's original line-up is made up of Miss Guy, Sean Pierce, Electric Eddie, Rocket, and Adam Vomit. Toilet Böys have toured world-wide supporting musical acts such as Red Hot Chili Peppers, Nashville Pussy, Orgy, The Damned, Dee Dee Ramone and Debbie Harry. They were known for a highly energetic stage show that included spark-showers, smoke, lasers, strobes, synchronized flame-columns, cheerleaders, confetti cannons, burning guitars and fire breathing performed by lead guitarist Sean during the finale.

An album of unreleased material, demos, and remixes titled Sex Music was released in 2007.

Toilet Böys reunited and played on June 14, 2010 at Le Poisson Rouge in New York City. Most of the band is back including Miss Guy, Sean, Eddie and Adam with the addition of Shane on guitar. They played the Azkena Rock festival in Spain in June 2010.

== History ==
The Toilet Böys formed in 1995 and their first show was as opening act for Debbie Harry, who performed with her own band at the rock club Don Hill's in New York City. They were not formed as a backing band for Deborah Harry as has been published and believed.

Toilet Böys lead singer Miss Guy (who was house-DJ at the club) formed the band to fulfill a dream of playing a show with Harry, one of his idols, just for one night. He put together a band specifically for this occasion, and it was only intended to be a one-time performance. The response was overwhelmingly positive, with the result being the booking of Toilet Böys for several additional gigs. Within a year and a half, the Toilet Böys line-up had solidified.

After their break up in 2003, Sean and Rocket formed the group Afterparty. Sean, under the name Chopper, performed his normal guitar duties as well as being the band's lead singer.

The band announced a temporary reunion in 2016 and released a two-part compilation "Rock 'n Roll Whores: The Best of Toilet Boys, Vol. 1" and "Nothing to Lose: The Best of Toilet Boys, Vol. 2", and also a new single with Boy George "The Last Breath of the World's Greatest Rock & Roll Love Affair".

== Discography ==
Year of release	Title	Record Label	Notes
1996	Toilet Böys	Squeezebox Records	
1997	Mail Itch/Dream Action	Hypurrr Records	
1998	Living Like a Millionaire	RAFR Records	
1998	Go To Hell	Devil Doll Records	b/w "Hard", "Be A Man"
1999	Sinners and Saints	Coldfront Records	
1999	You Got It	Lookout! Records	Split single with the Donnas
1999	Broken Home	Devil Doll Records	b/w "Shine On", "Baby's Wrong"
1999	Come and Get It	Cargo Records	
2000	Space Truckin/Slow Dancing	Coldfront records	7" split with American Heartbreak
2001	Toilet Böys	Masterplan Entertainment	
2003	Live In London	Ozit/Morpheus Records	
2004	The Early Years	Ozit/Morpheus Records	
2007	Sex Music	Dead City Records	
2012	Dumb Blonde		Guy solo EP
