= Dan Gatto =

American singer

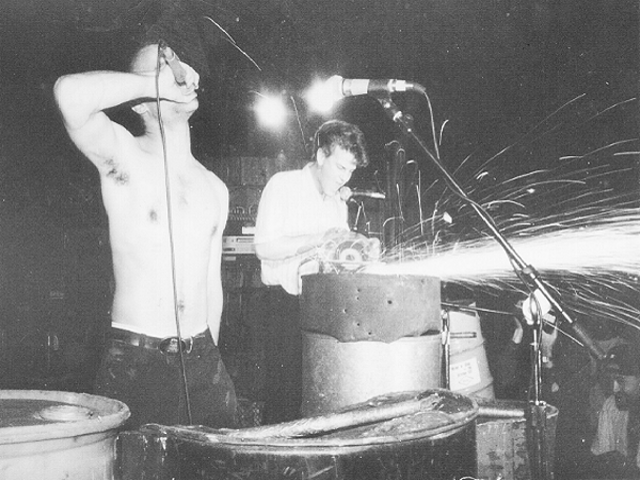
- Gatto (left) performing with Babyland in 1995

Background information
- Born: Dan Merrick Gatto; September 21, 1970 (age 55)
- Genres: Industrial rock, synth punk
- Occupation: Musician
- Instruments: Vocals, keyboards
- Years active: 1989–present

Dan Gatto (born Dan Merrick Gatto; September 21, 1970) is an American musician best recognized as the vocalist for synth punk band Babyland. He also collaborated with Vampire Rodents composer Daniel Vahnke on a project called Recliner. After Babyland dissolved in 2009, Gatto founded Continues as an outlet for his solo work.

== Biography ==
Gatto was born on September 21, 1970, and raised in the San Francisco Bay area. He became passionate about music at the age of twelve when he discovered The Human League's Dare album. By fifteen he had begun to compose electronic music and in 1989 formed the synth punk group Babyland with percussionist Michael Smith. They released six full-length albums between 1992 and 2008: You Suck Crap, A Total Letdown, Who's Sorry Now, Outlive Your Enemies, The Finger and Cavecraft. In 1992, Gatto met Daniel Vahnke, vocalist and composer for Vampire Rodents, and together they started the project Recliner. They collaborated on three songs together, "Trilobite", "Noise Dive" and Zygote, all of which appear on Vampire Rodents' Lullaby Land and Clockseed albums. In 2009, Michael Smith announced that he had become dissatisfied with the direction Babyland had headed and the duo parted ways in October of that year. Still eager to pursue music, Gatto began composing under the moniker Continues and released a self-titled solo album under the name in 2012.

== Discography ==
Babyland

- You Suck Crap (1992)
- A Total Letdown (1994)
- Who's Sorry Now (1995)
- Outlive Your Enemies (1998)
- The Finger (2004)
- Cavecraft (2008)

Continues

- Continues (2012)

Guest appearances

- Vampire Rodents: Lullaby Land (1993)
- Vampire Rodents: Clockseed (1995)
- Philipp Münch: Mondo Obscura (2012)
