= Flipside (fanzine) =

Fanzine based in Pasadena

- Flipside, issue 6, 1978
- Categories: Fanzine
- First issue: 1977
- Final issue: 2002
- Country: United States
- Based in: Whittier, California
- Language: English

Flipside, also known as Los Angeles Flipside Fanzine, was a punk zine published in Whittier and Pasadena, California, from 1977 to 2002. The magazine was associated with its own record label, Flipside Records, releasing vinyl records beginning in 1978.

As a U.S. punk rock fanzine, Flipside chronicled the independent and underground music scene by fans of the punk scene. Flipside evolved from a photocopied fanzine to a magazine produced by web offset printing and featuring glossy covers.

== Publication history ==
Los Angeles Flipside Fanzine was launched in 1977 in Whittier, California, by five Whittier High School friends, Pooch (Patrick DiPuccio), Larry Lash (Steven Shoemaker), Tory, X-8 (Sam Diaz), and editor and publisher Al Kowalewski. The initial issues of the publication were produced by means of a photocopy machine, with Kowalewski's first modest goal set at selling 1,000 copies per issue. Beginning with a tiny local distribution in a few Los Angeles area record stores, within two years the publication had grown sufficiently to support sheet-fed offset printing on heavy white stock for production, with sales tallied in 12 American states and four countries. Later issues were produced on newsprint via a high speed web press and included a glossy magazine cover.

From 1979 until 1989, the fanzine was co-owned and co-edited by Hudley "Hud" Flipside, a pseudonym of Holly Duval Cornell.

By the magazine's sixth anniversary in the summer of 1983, the press run had grown to 6,500 for America, with an additional printing in Germany for European distribution.

Flipside fanzine put on a Burning Man-style festival in California's Mojave Desert at a location known as Jawbone Canyon for several years during the mid-1990s. It was much smaller and more localized than the actual Burning Man festivals and often featured bands that Flipside released on their own label. Special guests included Fugazi, the Offspring and Hawkwind's Nik Turner.

Flipside published a special 10-year anniversary issue titled "Los Angeles Flipside Fanzine Issue 54", documenting the first ten years of punk rock from 1977 to 1987 with 224 pages of band interviews.

== Flipside Records ==
For several years, the publishers also produced punk rock records under the label name Flipside Records. Inspired by the ability of small local labels such as Dangerhouse Records and Slash Records, Kowalewski and Peter Landswick launched the Flipside label in 1978.

In 1979, Kowalewski recalled his own experiences in an effort to inspire additional DIY labels:

"...So anyway me and Pete were eating a pizza one day and Pete said, 'Ya know, Al, we oughta start a record company. We thought about it a while and we decided that if Dangerhouse could put out records and if Chris Ashford could put out records and if Slash could put out records, then we could put out records, too.... In the next four months we (mostly Pete, he's the president of Flipside Records) found out all about putting out a private single. We found out about mastering and labels and pressing and acetates and waiting and sleeves and waiting and now we know all there is to know.... The moral of this story is 'If we can do it, you can do it.' So everybody release your own singles!"

Bands on the roster included Detox, Doggy Style, Bulimia Banquet, Anti-Scrunti Faction, Babyland, Sluts for Hire, Popdefect, Paper Tulips, and Sandy Duncan's Eye.

Flipside Records released vinyl 12-inch compilations, Vol. 1, 2, and 3. Included on them are a variety of punk bands from GBH to Cheetah Chrome Motherfuckers. Each compilation included a bands and lyrics insert similar to an issue of Flipside Fanzine yet designed as a newspaper.

== Rodney on the ROQ Volume 1 - 3 ==
Los Angeles Flipside Fanzine worked on the Rodney on the ROQ compilation album projects with Posh Boy Records and Rodney Bingenheimer. The album's inserts were issues of Los Angeles Flipside Fanzine. Each insert includes the bands of each volume (music tracks and lyrics) including pictures and interviews gathered by Flipside. Rodney on the ROQ included Flipside Fanzine insert Issue 21 (December 1980). Rodney on the ROQ Volume 2 included Flipside Fanzine Issue 28 (November 1981). Rodney on the ROQ Vol III included Flipside Fanzine Issue 35 (December 82). This was a strategic time for a radio personality, a record label and a fanzine to work together to support and promote a growing musical underground and exclusive punk scene.

== Flipside Video ==
Los Angeles Flipside Video was a project created by Al, Gus and Hudley. Gus took some classes at a local Jr. College, Rio Hondo, and thus began our journey of live recordings. Cameras, editing equipment and mail order was all done in house at the Flipside office. Video 1 through 10 included many of the bands interviewed in Flipside Fanzine for example; Social Distortion, Big Boys, 100 Flowers, Toy Dolls, Pillsbury Hardcore , The Adolescents, Entropy, Final Conflict, The Dicks, Corrosion of Conformity. A special video was dedicated to GBH (band) called Brit Boys Attacked by Brats . All videos were taped live at many of the clubs and venues that were popular at the time.

== Key personnel ==
The editors and staff writers contributing to Los Angeles Flipside Fanzine were jokingly referred to as the "Staph," particularly during the fanzine's earlier years. It has been written that KROQ success was due to its renegade roots, and willingness to experiment, which came along at the same time of the birth of the punk and new wave. This is reflected in the songs it made famous. In the same vein, Flipside, and its writers helped promote the punk rock scene globally, and became part of the scene themselves.

Key contributors included the following:

- "Al Flipside" - Al Kowalewski
- "HUD, Hudley Flipside" - Holly Cornell
- "Joy" — Joy Aoki
- "Thom Flipside" — Thom Bone
- "Michele Flipside" - Michele Fiat
- "Pete" — Peter Landswick
- "Pooch" — Pat DiPuccio
- "Todd" — Todd Taylor
- "X-8" — Sam Diaz
- "Tory" — Jorge Torres
- "Dave Damage" — David Blevins
- "Dee"
- "Dean Dead" — Dean Rowan
- "Gerber" — Michelle Bell
- "Gus Hudson"
- "Helen Jewel"
- "Hilda"
- "Joe" — Joe Henderson
- "KRK" — Kirk Dominguez
- "Larry Lash" — Steve Shoemaker
- "Jill Masters"
- "Paul Problem"
- "Paul Hessing"
- "Kori Capaldi"
- "Nate Flipside"
- "Royce" — Royce Dieckmann
- "Thrashead" — Mike Sullivan
- "Cake" — Carlos Nuñez
- "3-D" aka "Dan Druff" — Dan Malone
- "Martin Banner"

== See also ==
- Razorcake (successor publication founded by Todd Taylor, former Flipside managing editor)
- Punk zine
