= Theo Kogan =

American singer (born 1969)

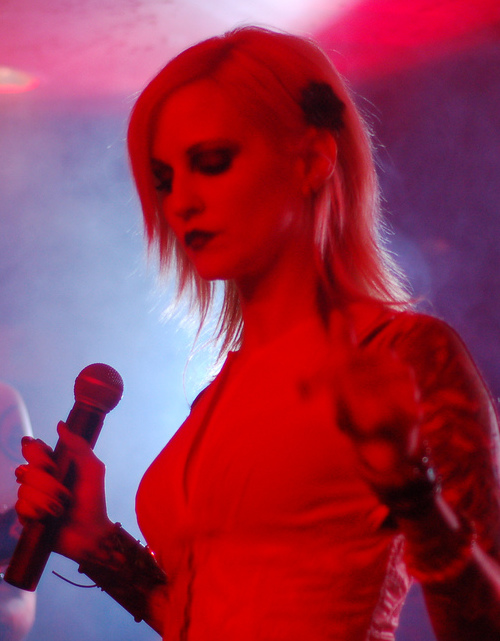
- Kogan live in 2005 with Theo & the Skyscrapers

Background information
- Born: December 23, 1969 (age 56); Quito, Ecuador
- Genres: Riot grrrl, hardcore punk, electronic
- Occupations: Singer, songwriter, actress, model
- Years active: 1987–present
- Labels: Go Kart, Dark Daddy, Blast First, Safe House

Theo Kogan (born December 23, 1969) is an American singer, songwriter, model, and actress, best known as the vocalist of the all-girl punk band Lunachicks. She also sang in the dance/electronic band Theo & the Skyscrapers. She also had her own cosmetics line, Armour Beauty, and now works as a professional makeup artist for the TV, advertising, fashion and cosmetics industries. She is married to Sean Pierce, the guitarist of Theo & the Skyscrapers and the Toilet Böys.

== Early life ==
Kogan was born by C-section to Jewish American parents in Quito, Ecuador, in December 1969. Her itinerant family moved to Brooklyn, New York City, when she was six months old. She grew up around musical family members: her aunt was in the National Symphony and her uncle played timpani in jazz bands. Her father conducted symphonies and created computer programs, teaching music to children. Her mother was a secretary who became art director at Diversion magazine before becoming a therapist. Her ancestry includes Jewish immigrants from Russia, Ukraine, Poland and Romania several generations before her.

Growing up, she was inspired by the Beatles, the Rolling Stones as well as female musicians such as Debbie Harry, Chaka Khan, Donna Summer, Joan Jett, Chrissie Hynde and Pat Benatar. Kogan attended Fiorello H. LaGuardia High School where she formed the Lunachicks.

== Career ==
Kogan has had roles in movies such as Zoolander, Rock Star, In the Cut, Bringing Out the Dead, and High Times' Potluck. She has also appeared on Law & Order: Special Victims Unit, Third Watch and The Jon Stewart Show. She has done voice over work for Live Freaky! Die Freaky! Kogan can also be seen in Screen Test, a Broadway musical directed by Rob Roth which her band Theo and the Skyscrapers composed the music for.

Kogan has modeled in ad campaigns for Calvin Klein, Rimmel, and Kenneth Cole.

== Filmography ==
=== Film ===
Year	Title	Role	Notes
1999	Terror Firmer	Theodora	Also music supervisor
1999	Bringing Out the Dead	Prostitute	
2000	Hair Burners	Florencia Josephine Manetti	
2001	Zoolander	Cool Tattoo Girl	
2002	Tadpole	Woman in Bar	
2002	The New Generation	Moby	
2002	High Times' Potluck	Jade	
2003	In the Cut	Baby Doll Bartender	
2004	Rock Star	Heaven Scent	
2006	Live Freaky! Die Freaky!	Hadie	
2009	Falling Awake	Bartender	

=== Television ===
Year	Title	Role	Notes
2001	Third Watch	Female Teen	Episode: "The Relay"
2003	Law & Order: SVU	Club Girl	Episode: "Grief"
