= Go-Kart Records =

Independent record label

- Genre: Punk rock
- Country of origin: United States
- Location: New York City
- Official website: www.gokartrecords.com

Go-Kart Records was an independent record label specializing in punk rock located in New York City that was most active from 1995 to 2005. It also has a European division in Mannheim, Germany.

== History ==
In its May 1999 issue, Guitar World magazine listed Go-Kart as one of the "twelve most influential forces in punk rock today" along with Epitaph Records, Ian MacKaye, Jello Biafra and NOFX.

In 2003 the label released the first commercially available MP3 CdD entitled the "Go-kart MP300 Raceway." All-music called the release a, "revolution in a jewel case." It contained 300 songs from 150 bands and included an MP3 player and instructions on how to burn the songs to CD.

In 2004, the company opened an office in Los Angeles and started an offshoot division to release independent films under the moniker Go-kart Films. The Los Angeles office closed in 2008.

From 2006 to 2007, label owner Greg Ross hosted a show entitled Radio Free Greg on Punk Radio Cast (punkradiocast.com) that was the station's most popular show and one of the most listened to shows on the Internet.

As of 2012, the label has slowed down, occasionally releasing music under the Go-Kart imprint as well as its pop-punk imprint Kid Tested Records.

== Artists ==
=== Go-Kart ===
Artists that appeared on Go-kart releases (full-lengths, EPs and 7"s --- does not include artists that appeared only on compilations)

- 46 Short
- 4Ft Fingers
- Amazombies
- Anti-Flag
- Bambix
- Banner Pilot
- Berserk
- Black Army Jacket
- Black Velvet Flag
- Boris The Sprinkler
- Brothers Of Conquest
- Buttsteak
- Buzzcocks
- Candy Snatchers
- Canned Travolta
- Capture The Flag
- Conflict
- Cougars
- Daycare Swindlers
- Doc Hopper
- Down By Law
- GBH
- Guff
- Hagfish
- Hemlock
- I Farm
- Icons Of Filth
- INDK
- IRA
- Jett Brando
- Lunachicks
- Manda And The Marbles
- The Menzingers
- Misery
- Parasites
- Pigmy Love Circus
- Pinkerton Thugs
- Plan A Project
- Pseudo Heroes
- Randy's Ripcord
- RIFU
- Sexpod
- Shake Appeal
- Sick On The Bus
- Southport
- Star Strangled Bastards
- Stress Magnets
- Sweet Diesel
- Ten Foot Pole
- The Control
- The Meatmen
- The Shocker
- The Spades
- The Templars
- The Voluptuous Horror of Karen Black
- Token Entry
- Toxic Narcotic
- Transmission0
- Trick Babys
- Two Man Advantage
- Underdog
- Varukers
- Vision of Disorder
- Weston
- Wives

=== Go-Kart Europe ===
Artists Released on Go-kart Europe (full-lengths, EPs and 7"s --- does not include artists that appeared only on compilations)

- Bambix
- Dr. Norton
- Duesenjaeger
- Go Faster Nuns
- Jupiter Jones
- Malkovich
- Nervous Nellie
- Olehole
- Rifu
- The Shocker
- The Very Job Agency
- World/Inferno Friendship Society

== Compilations ==
- Brats On The Beat: Ramones for Kids
- Destroy Television VHS
- Double Exposure
- Expose Yourself
- Go-Kart vs. the Corporate Giant
- Go-Kart vs. the Corporate Giant 2
- Go-Kart vs. the Corporate Giant 3
- Go-Kart vs. the Corporate Giant 4
- NY's Hardest 3
- Over Exposed
- Pop Punk's Not Dead
- Punk Uprisings 2
- Skippy Zine/ CD
- Soundtrack to Troma's Terror Firmer
- Step on a Crack Vol.2
- The Go-kart MP300 Raceway
- Twisted TV DVD
- Welcome To The Altamont Speedway 7"
- Your Scene Sucks

== Advocacy ==
The label is an outspoken critic of the Recording Industry Association of America (RIAA), arguing that the association uses ineffective and heavy-handed business tactics and does not fulfill its claims to represent the music industry. In contrast to the RIAA, the label promotes music downloads, arguing that they help consumers sample music before buying. It has released five albums and numerous single songs for free download on its webpage.

== See also ==
- List of record labels
