= The Crow (comics) =

Comic book series created by James O'Barr

- The Crow #1 (February 1989).

Publication information
- Publisher: Caliber Press, Kitchen Sink Press, Image Comics, IDW Publishing, Sumerian Comics
- First appearance: Caliber Presents #1 (Jan. 1989)
- Created by: James O'Barr

In-story information
- Alter ego: Eric
- Abilities: Enhanced strength, speed, and agility; Cat-like reflexes; Heightened senses; Resistance to injury or pain; Invulnerability; Skilled marksmanship
The Crow
Publication information
- Publisher: Caliber Press (1989–1990); Kitchen Sink Press (1996–1998); Image Comics (1999); IDW Publishing (2012–2020); Sumerian Comics (2024–)
- Format: Limited series
- Genre: Superhero, dark fantasy
- Publication date: February 1989 – November 1999
- No. of issues: 45+
- Main character(s): Eric; Shelly
Creative team
- Written by: James O'Barr, John Wagner, James Vance, Jerry Prosser, Christopher Golden, Everette Hartsoe, Jon J Muth, John Shirley, Frank Bill
- Artist(s): James O'Barr, Alexander Maleev, Charlie Adlard, Jamie Tolagson, Paul Lee, Kevin Colden, Antoine Dodé, Drew Moss
- Penciller: Philip Hester
- Inker: Andé Parks
Collected editions
- The Crow: Special Edition: ISBN 978-1451627251

The Crow is a supernatural superhero comic book series created by James O'Barr revolving around the titular character of the same name. The series focuses on Eric, who is killed along with his fiancée, Shelly, by the group of thugs a year ago, was brought back to life by the supernatural crow, becoming a vengeful undead vigilante to exact revenge against his killers, known as the "Crow". The series, which was originally created by O'Barr as a means of dealing with the death of his fiancée at the hands of a drunk driver, was first published by Caliber Comics in 1989. It became an underground success and was later adapted into a film of the same name in 1994. It was followed by three standalone sequels and a television series. A second adaptation was released in 2024. Numerous books and comic books have also been produced, albeit published by various different companies.

The Crow has been translated into almost a dozen languages and has sold around 750,000 copies worldwide.

== Publication history ==
=== Caliber Press ===
The Crow first appeared on the back cover of Deadworld #10 (November 1988); James O'Barr provided a back cover to the first comic book Caliber Press published, which contained an advertisement for the upcoming The Crow appearance in Caliber Presents #1. The ads shows The Crow standing with a smoking shotgun in one hand and a samurai sword in the other, with the statement, "For Some Things...There Is No Forgiveness". It mentions The Crow appearing in February 1989.

The Crow's first in-story appearance was in Caliber Presents #1 (January 1989), in the story "Inertia", which serves as a prelude to the main series. O'Barr again provided a back cover for this issue.

The character's first limited series was The Crow #1–4 (February–May 1989). Four issues, titled "Pain", "Fear", "Irony", and "Despair", take readers through a series of vengeance tales as The Crow cuts and shoots through Tin-Tin, Tom-Tom, Top Dollar, Funboy and T-Bird, the gang members that attacked and killed him and his lover Shelly.

In A Caliber Christmas (December 1989), Eric reflects back on happier times with Shelly in the story "Atmosphere". In The Crow graphic novel, this story is placed between issues #2 and 3.

Caliber Presents #15 (September 1990) contained a key preview of The Crow #5, titled "Death" which was left unpublished. The preview was a story to conclude the original arc.

=== Tundra Publishing ===
Tundra Publishing later reprinted Caliber's first four issues in two double-sized volumes and printed "Death" (also double-sized) as the third volume.

=== Kitchen Sink Press ===
In 1993, Kitchen Sink Press collected The Crow into a graphic novel. A limited hardcover edition was also released by Graphitti Designs.

From 1996–98, Kitchen Sink published five mini-series and a one-shot based on The Crow concept with a new avatar in each series.

=== London Night Studios ===
Following the Kitchen Sink series, London Night Studios published The Crow/Razor: Kill the Pain in 1998, which saw Eric Draven paired with Everette Hartsoe's bad girl character Razor in five numbered issues (#0–4), plus "Finale" and "The Lost Chapter" in February 1999.

=== Image Comics ===
In 1999, Image Comics released a new Crow comic series with yet another take on the Eric Draven story. It ran for ten issues, ending in November of that year.

=== Pocket Books ===
In 2002, Pocket Books re-released the original Crow graphic novel after being out-of-print for several years.

=== Gallery Books ===
O'Barr revealed in a 2004 interview that an Author's Edition would contain at least "60 pages of new material that no one has ever seen. Half of that are pages that had to be removed for space reasons". O'Barr described the additions as including "more romance flashback scenes between Eric and Shelly", as well as sequences that would make the work "more visually interesting". The Crow: Special Edition was released on July 28, 2011, published by Gallery Books.

=== IDW Publishing ===
In July 2012, IDW Publishing published a new five-issue Crow series, The Crow: Death and Rebirth, written by novelist John Shirley (co-writer of the original Crow film) and illustrated by Kevin Colden.

Six more IDW Crow series followed: The Crow: Skinning the Wolves (2013), The Crow: Curare (2013), The Crow: Pestilence (2014), The Crow: Memento Mori (2018), The Crow: Hack/Slash (2019) and The Crow: Lethe (2020), as well as two IDW one-shot issues: The X-Files/The Crow: Conspiracy (2014) and The Crow: Hark the Herald (2019).

=== Sumerian Comics ===
In July 2024, Sumerian Comics revealed during San Diego Comic-Con that they would be taking over the license to reprint stories as well as publish new stories within the universe. The first reprint announced is The Crow: Dead Time #1 - 3 to be released monthly beginning in October 2024.

== Plot ==
The story revolves around an unfortunate young man named Eric. He and his fiancée, Shelly, are assaulted by a gang of street thugs after their car breaks down. Eric is shot in the head and paralyzed; he can only watch as Shelly is savagely beaten, raped, and then shot in the head. They are then left for dead on the side of the road. Eric later dies in the hospital operating room, while Shelly is dead on arrival.

He is resurrected by a crow and seeks vengeance on the murderers, methodically stalking and killing them. When not on the hunt, Eric stays in the house he shared with Shelly, spending most of his time there, lost in memories of her. Her absence is torture for him; he is in emotional pain, even engaging in self-mutilation by cutting himself.

The crow acts as both a guide and goad for Eric, giving him information that helps him in his quest, but also chastising him for dwelling on Shelly's death, seeing his pining as useless self-indulgence that distracts him from his purpose.

== Characters ==
- Eric/The Crow: The titular main protagonist, he was shot in the head and paralyzed, being forced to watch all the brutal things done to Shelly. He dies shortly after. A year after his death, his soul is brought back into his dead body by the supernatural crow, who serves him as his guidance and companion. Now as an undead avenger and vigilante, Eric begins to exact revenge against his four killers to avenge himself and the death of his fiancée, known as the "Crow". Unlike the film, however, since Eric is basically a walking corpse, he does not heal and is totally invulnerable.
- The crow (crow) serves as a guide to Eric as well as a companion. Unlike in the film, the crow is not a real bird but a spirit that only Eric sees (and T-Bird, once, at the very end). Given its nature, it cannot be killed.
- The Skull Cowboy: A dark character that exists mostly to keep Eric on track in his mission and from becoming too attached to his memories.
- Shelly: Fiancée of Eric who gets raped and killed by T-Bird's gang. She appears in Eric's dreams and memories.
- Sherri: A young street girl whom Eric meets while going after Funboy. Sherri is shown as upset, due to her mother not being there for her, and even goes so far as to tell Eric that she believes she's been bad and God sent her to Hell. She and Eric seem to bond closely, and, feeling sorry for her, Eric gives her Shelly's engagement ring. She's overjoyed, because no one has ever given her a gift before, and she calls him a "blockhead" while he calls her a "princess." She is renamed Sarah, in the film adaptation.
- T-Bird: The head of the gang that murders Shelly and Eric.
- Funboy: T-Bird's right-hand man, a morphine addict who is sleeping with Sherri's mother.
- Top Dollar: A low-level drug dealer who also participated in gang-raping Shelly; in the 1994 film adaptation, he is the main antagonist rather than T-Bird.
- Tin-Tin: The first of T-Bird's gang to be eliminated by Eric.
- Tom-Tom: Another of T-Bird's soldiers and one of Shelly's rapists, whom Eric interrogates over the whereabouts of Shelly's ring. Tom-Tom is absent from the film adaptation and his role is largely rewritten into a new character named Skank.
- Gideon: A pawnbroker who fences Shelly's engagement ring after it is given to him by T-Bird; in the 1994 film adaptation, Tin-Tin has pawned him the ring.
- Officer Albrecht: A beat cop who confronts Eric outside of Gideon's pawnshop.
- Captain Hook: The detective who originally handled Eric and Shelly's case. Eric sends him his regards through Albrecht.

== Critical reception ==
The Crow is ranked 37th in IGN's Top 100 Comic Book Heroes.

== In other media ==
=== Film ===
In 1994, a film based on the comic, titled The Crow, was released to theaters by Miramax Films. The film was both a critical and commercial success, earning $50,693,129 total gross during its theatrical release. A cult following, in part due to the accidental death of its star Brandon Lee on the film's set, has maintained the film's popularity, with a regular staple of movie memorabilia being found at retailers like Hot Topic. Three sequels have been made so far: The Crow: City of Angels (1996), starring Vincent Perez (as The Crow), Mia Kirshner, Richard Brooks and Iggy Pop; The Crow: Salvation (2000), starring Eric Mabius (as The Crow), Kirsten Dunst and Fred Ward; and The Crow: Wicked Prayer (2005), starring Edward Furlong (as The Crow), David Boreanaz and Tara Reid.

In the late 1990s, a sequel/reboot to The Crow entitled The Crow: 2037 was in the works and would have been set in the future. It was written and scheduled to be directed by Rob Zombie, but was ultimately cancelled.

A second film adaptation of the original 1989 comic series, directed by Rupert Sanders and starring Bill Skarsgård as Eric, was released on August 23, 2024, by Lionsgate Films.

=== Television ===
A television series, The Crow: Stairway to Heaven, aired in syndication in 1998, running for one season. An adaptation of the original comic series, it starred Mark Dacascos as Draven.

=== Novels and a story collection ===
From 1996 to 2001, a number of novels based on the world and thematic concerns of The Crow were published, mostly by Harper. Authors of these novels included such notable names as Chet Williamson (City of Angels novelization and Clash By Night), David Bischoff (Quoth the Crow), Poppy Z. Brite (The Lazarus Heart), S. P. Somtow (Temple of Night), Norman Partridge (Wicked Prayer), and A. A. Attanasio (Hellbound).

In 1998, O'Barr and editor Ed Kramer asked an array of fiction writers, poets, and artists—including Gene Wolfe, Alan Dean Foster, Charles de Lint, Jack Dann, Jane Yolen, Henry Rollins and Iggy Pop—to interpret this Gothic fiction phenomenon. The Crow: Shattered Lives and Broken Dreams was released by Random House on Halloween; and a year later, in a limited signed and numbered volume, by Donald M. Grant Publishing.

=== Video games ===
The Crow: City of Angels is a 1997 action video game for Sega Saturn, Sony PlayStation and Microsoft Windows. It is loosely based on the film of the same name. The player assumes the role of the hero of the film, Ashe Corven. It received negative reviews. Ojom GmbH released a j2me game called simply The Crow.

=== Music ===
There have been five albums of music related to The Crow and its attendant films:

- Fear and Bullets (1994) – an album created through a collaboration between James O'Barr and longtime friend John Bergin as a soundtrack to O'Barr's graphic novel The Crow. It was originally released in 1994 along with a limited edition hardcover copy of the graphic novel.
- The Crow: Original Motion Picture Soundtrack (1994) – showcases the film's music by popular artists.
- The Crow: Original Motion Picture Score (1994) – original music written by Graeme Revell for the film The Crow; not to be confused with the soundtrack album, above.
- The Crow: City of Angels (1996) – soundtrack to the film of the same name; features a cover of the Fleetwood Mac song "Gold Dust Woman" by Hole, as well as tracks by artists such as White Zombie, Korn, and Iggy Pop. Like the original Crow soundtrack, a song by Joy Division (one of O'Barr's favorite bands) is covered: "In a Lonely Place" by Bush.
- The Crow: Salvation (2000) – compiled and produced by Jeff Most. As with the soundtrack to The Crow: City of Angels, it includes an otherwise unavailable cover version by Hole: this time of Bob Dylan's "It's All Over Now, Baby Blue". Several other notable contemporary artists are also featured on the soundtrack.
- Metalcore band Ice Nine Kills released the song "A Grave Mistake" as part of their 2018 Silver Scream album. The song is directly inspired by the 1994 film. A slower, live version of the song was also released with the "Final" version of the album.

=== Card game ===
The Crow is an out-of-print collectible card game by Heartbreaker Press and Target Games. It is based on the comics by James O'Barr and depicted images from the film adaptation. It was released in November 1995 but initially had a release date of March 1995. It was one of three sets released by Heartbreaker Press and Target Games in November along with James Bond 007 and Kult. The game did not have starter decks, and instead it had a core set with 122 cards that included 10 foils that had artwork from the comic. The game was sold in booster packs of 15 cards, but no starter packs were available. A promo card called The Confident Crow was available by mail through proof-of-purchase order. An expansion titled Crow: City of Angels was announced for an October 1996 release but never materialized.

Players control Angel, Devil, and Neutral Bystander cards and then send them into combat with "opposing [P]ersonalities". Action cards allow players to pump or hinder a Personality. Each Personality has an attack and defense value, as well as Virtue, which is equal to the highest value. Players play their Personality card and discard cards from their hands equal to the Virtue of the played card, and then they attack. If a player has a higher attack value than their opponent's defense value, the opponent is wounded. If a Personality would be wounded again, it is killed. A player wins by killing 25 Virtue worth of an opponent's Personalities.

Andy Butcher reviewed The Crow for Arcane magazine, rating it a 6 out of 10 overall. Butcher comments that "The Crow is a simple game that would serve as a good introduction to CCGs. There's just enough depth to give it some skill, and the game mechanics are elegant. Experienced players may find it limiting and lacking in lasting appeal".

== Bibliography ==
=== Comics ===
- The Crow (4 issues, 1989, Caliber Press) by James O'Barr
  - Collected with the addition of new material as The Crow: Special Edition (Gallery Books, 2011)
- The Crow: Dead Time (3 issues, 1996, Kitchen Sink Press) story by James O'Barr & John Wagner, art by Alexander Maleev
  - Collected as The Crow: Midnight Legends Volume 1: Dead Time (IDW, 2012)
- The Crow: Flesh and Blood (3 issues, 1996, Kitchen Sink) story by James Vance, art by Alexander Maleev
  - Collected as The Crow: Midnight Legends Volume 2: Flesh and Blood (IDW, 2012)
- The Crow: City of Angels (3 issues, 1996, Kitchen Sink, adapted from the screenplay)
- The Crow: Wild Justice (3 issues, 1996, Kitchen Sink) story by Jerry Prosser, art by Charlie Adlard
  - Collected as The Crow: Midnight Legends Volume 3: Wild Justice (IDW, 2013)
- The Crow: Waking Nightmares (4 issues, 1997–1998, Kitchen Sink) story by Christopher Golden, art by Philip Hester
  - Collected as The Crow: Midnight Legends Volume 4: Waking Nightmares (IDW, 2013)
- The Crow #0: A Cycle of Shattered Lives (one-shot, 1998, Kitchen Sink) story by James O'Barr / various
- The Crow / Razor: Kill the Pain (7 issues, 1998–1999, London Night Studios) story by Everette Hartsoe
- The Crow (10 issues, 1999, Image Comics), story by Jon J Muth, art by Jamie Tolagson & Paul Lee
  - Issue #1–5 collected as The Crow: Midnight Legends Volume 5: Resurrection (IDW, 2013)
  - Issue #6–10 collected as The Crow: Midnight Legends Volume 6: Touch Of Evil (IDW, 2014)
- The French Crow (5 volumes, 2002–2011, Goutte D'Or Production / Réflexions) stories by various, including Isha ("La Mort Sur Le Trottoir"), Christophe Henin ("Medieval Crow") and Yoann Boisseau ("Le Sang des Innocents"), published in France
- The Crow: Death & Rebirth (5 issues, 2012, IDW) story by John Shirley, art by Kevin Colden
- The Crow: Skinning the Wolves (3 issues, 2012, IDW) story by James O'Barr and Jim Terry
- The Crow: Curare (3 issues, 2013, IDW) story by James O'Barr, art by Antoine Dodé
- The X-Files/The Crow: Conspiracy (one-shot, 2014, IDW) story by Denton J. Tipton, art by Vic Malhotra
- The Crow: Pestilence (4 issues, 2014, IDW) story by Frank Bill, art by Drew Moss
- The Crow: Memento Mori (4 issues, 2018, IDW) story by Roberto Recchioni and Matteo Scalera, art by Werther Dell'Edera and Matteo Scalera
- The Crow: Hack/Slash (4 issues, 2019, IDW) story by Tim Seeley, art by Jim Terry
- The Crow: Hark the Herald (one-shot, 2019, IDW) story by Tim Seeley, art by Meredith Laxton
- The Crow: Lethe (3 issues, 2020, IDW) story by Tim Seeley, art by Ilias Kyriazis

=== Novels ===
- The Crow: Die Krähe (Goldmann Wilhelm GmbH, 1994) by Kenneth Roycroft, in German
- The Crow: City of Angels (Berkeley, 1996) by Chet Williamson
- The Crow: Quoth the Crow (Harper, 1998) by David Bischoff
- The Crow: The Lazarus Heart (Harper Prism, 1998) by Poppy Z. Brite
- The Crow: Clash by Night (Harper, 1998) by Chet Williamson
- The Crow: Temple of Night (Harper, 1999) by S. P. Somtow
- The Crow: Wicked Prayer (Harper, 2000) by Norman Partridge
- The Crow: Hellbound (Harper, 2001) by A. A. Attanasio

=== Short stories ===
- The Crow: Shattered Lives & Broken Dreams (Random House, 1999) ed. James O'Barr & Ed Kramer

== See also ==
- "The Raven"
- Devil's Night
- Anthony (character)
- List of comic books
- List of fictional birds
