= The Crow: Salvation =

2000 film by Bharat Nalluri

- Promotional release poster
- Directed by: Bharat Nalluri
- Written by: Chip Johannessen
- Based on: The Crow by James O'Barr
- Produced by: Edward R. Pressman; Jeff Most
- Starring: Kirsten Dunst; Eric Mabius; Jodi Lyn O'Keefe; William Atherton; Fred Ward
- Cinematography: Carolyn Chen
- Edited by: Howard E. Smith
- Music by: Marco Beltrami
- Production companies: IMF; Edward R. Pressman Film Corporation; Jeff Most Productions Miramax; Pacifica Film Development
- Distributed by: Dimension Films
- Release dates: September 15, 2000 (Spokane); March 20, 2001 (United States)
- Running time: 102 minutes
- Country: United States
- Language: English
- Budget: $10 million

The Crow: Salvation is a 2000 American superhero film directed by Bharat Nalluri and written by Chip Johannessen. It is the third installment in The Crow film series and features no returning characters from previous entries. The film stars Kirsten Dunst, Eric Mabius, Jodi Lyn O'Keefe, William Atherton, and Fred Ward. The Crow: Salvation was released direct to video on March 20, 2001 by Dimension Films, the first entry in the series to forgo a wide theatrical release, and received negative reviews from critics.

== Plot ==
In Salt Lake City, Alexander "Alex" Frederick Corvis is framed for the murder of his girlfriend, Lauren Randall, and sentenced to death. Three years later, he is executed in the electric chair, suffering a painful death due to lightning overloading the energy of the chair.

The Crow resurrects Alex in the prison morgue and gives him supernatural abilities, allowing him to escape the prison and avenge Lauren's death. Alex follows the crow and finds evidence at the police station that Lauren was killed by a group of corrupt cops, including one with a scar on his arm matching the one he saw just before his execution. Later, at Lauren's grave, he encounters her sister, Erin, where the angel statue sheds a bloody tear. Erin believes that he is guilty, but Alex tells her that he will prove his innocence.

Later, Alex finds Thomas Leonard, the witness in the trial who was bribed to give a perjured testimony and forces him to confess that four members of the police force set Alex up: Martin Toomey, James Erlich, Stan Roberts, and Phillip Dutton. Unbeknownst to him, there was also a fifth officer involved: Detective Madden.

Alex begins his road to vengeance, killing Dutton while saving two young girls he was sexually harassing, but not before reading his mind, discovering his role in Lauren's murder. Dutton tried to rape Lauren that day, only for her to use his gun to shoot Erlich. Alex then confronts Erlich, who assaulted his lawyer, Peter Walsh, at his office and hijacks his car. Alex instigates a police pursuit and crashes Erlich's car, blowing it up with Erlich inside, while also (inadvertently) destroying a police helicopter in the process. Alex drops the list of the cops he is after, and it is later found by Roberts and Toomey. With evidence found in Erlich's car, Alex and Erin find out that Nathan Randall, Erin and Lauren's father, is in business with the corrupt cops and is indirectly responsible for her death when Lauren uncovered the truth. Erin runs away in horror from her father when she is confronted with the truth.

Madden is ordered by Police Captain John Book and his secretary (also his lover) to deal with Leonard. Roberts and Toomey interrogate Leonard at his apartment about who killed Dutton and Erlich, and despite Leonard stating it was Alex, he and his wife are killed, orphaning their child. Alex confronts Walsh about his findings with the dirty cops and their connection to a company called DERT. Erin confesses to Alex that she felt guilty for Lauren's murder because she told the cops where they could find her, thinking that they would only arrest Alex. With his powers, Alex shows Erin that Lauren fought off her attackers and that Erin should forgive herself. Captain John Book heads to the prison with his secretary and Madden to investigate the prison break; they discover Alex's body missing from the morgue and the Crow insignia from a broken mirror, confirming that he has been resurrected. When Erin returns home, she finds her father dead, having been killed by Book in an earlier confrontation. Later, Alex finds out from Walsh that one of Nathan's businesses ran DERT, revealing it to be a front for a drug smuggling operation.

Book and Madden break into Walsh's office, where they fatally wound him and kidnap Erin; Walsh leaves a clue for Alex just before Madden finishes him off. Alex starts a fiasco at the Key Club and discovers that Lauren had witnessed Roberts killing a man named Sampson there, leading to her death. He is then confronted by Roberts, Toomey, and a team of cops as a shootout ensues. Alex impales Roberts with a pipe that he breaks off from the ceiling and kills the remaining cops. Madden shows up and tries to kill Alex, but his gunfire accidentally shoots a broken gas pipe. The explosion kills Toomey, and Alex walks out of the fire and sees a dismembered arm in the rubble with the zig-zag scar on it, believing the man with the scar to be among the crowd. The Crow leaves Alex, believing he has "fulfilled his duty". He then loses his ability to heal faster after an incident where he visualized Lauren, but it was a female bystander, whose boyfriend knocks Alex to the ground, giving him a bloody nose.

From Walsh's dying clue, Alex deduces that the "King" is Book. He heads to the police station to save Erin and kill Book, but without his powers, he is stabbed by Book and dies from his wounds. In agony, Book taunts Alex into believing that he killed Lauren, making the latter accept his demise. Book, Madden, and the secretary bring Alex's body to a room where Erin is tied with her mouth stitched shut and the body of Walsh hanging and missing an arm, revealing him to be the owner of the dismembered arm that Alex saw at the Key Club. Erin manages to pass Lauren's locket to the Crow, who drops it next to Alex, being a promise of love and truth. It revives Alex, restoring his powers and allowing him to set Erin free and kill both Madden and the secretary, while Book runs after Erin after she escapes and unstitches her mouth. Alex catches up with them and exposes Book's arm, showing the actual zig-zag scar Alex saw during the attack the night of Lauren's murder, therefore revealing Book as the mastermind who ultimately ordered the murders of Lauren and Thomas, as well as Alex's setup.

Alex and Erin take Book to the electric chair and electrocute him to the point of cremation. Alex's soul is finally released to reunite with Lauren and Erin keeps Lauren's necklace with her.

== Cast ==
- Eric Mabius as Alexander "Alex" Frederick Corvis / The Crow, Lauren's boyfriend, who is murdered via being framed and wrongfully executed for her murder, then resurrected by a mystical crow and gifted supernatural abilities in order to clear his name and avenge her death.
- Kirsten Dunst as Erin Randall, Nathan's daughter and Lauren's sister.
- William Atherton as Nathan Randall, Erin and Lauren's father, who is in business with dirty cops.
- Grant Shaud as Peter Walsh, a lawyer who was close to Alex.
- Jodi Lyn O'Keefe as Lauren Randall, Nathan's daughter, Erin's sister and Alex's girlfriend; who was killed by a group of corrupt cops, while her boyfriend Alex was framed and executed for her murder.
- David H. Stevens as Thomas Leonard, the false witness whose lies pinned Corvis on Lauren's murder
- Dale Midkiff as Vincent Erlich, a corrupt police detective with a bullet wound in his leg.
- Bill Mondy as Phillip Dutton, a corrupt and sexual-crazed police detective.
- Walton Goggins as Stanley Roberts, a corrupt police detective known to carry out hits and tortures.
- Tim DeKay as Martin Toomey, a corrupt police detective working alongside Roberts.
- Don Shanks as Guard Mercer, a guard captain working in the prison Corvis was incarcerated in
- Joey Miyashima as Radio Guard
- Debbie Fan as Barbara Chen, a news anchor covering Corvis's execution
- Kylee Cochran as Tracy
- Bruce McCarty as Detective Madden, a corrupt police detective and enforcer working personally for Book.
- Kelly Haren as Secretary
- Fred Ward as Captain John L. Book, a corrupt police captain who has the scars on his arm and the mastermind behind Alex and Lauren's deaths.
- Noname Jane as Young Stripper

== Production ==
=== Development ===
Following the critical and commercial under performance of The Crow: City of Angels, series producers Edward R. Pressman and Jeff Most set their sights on producing a third film in the hopes of salvaging the property. Serving as executive producers were Harvey Weinstein and Bob Weinstein of Miramax and Dimension Films. At this time, Steven E. de Souza was developing an action film, titled Ballistic, with Phillip Rhee at Warner Brothers with Oliver Stone and A. Kitman Ho producing. John Woo was in talks to helm the project, but separate creative conflicts with Stone and the studio stalled Ballistic out completely. However, the screenplay managed to capture Pressman's attention. Over the course of two days in April 1997, the producer and de Souza reworked Ballistic into The Crow 3: Resurrection, which featured a brain dead protagonist in a mental hospital revived by the crow. de Souza had a preestablished relationship with Pressman, having been unsuccessfully courted to script new pages for The Crow during reshoots and penned Street Fighter and Judge Dredd for his studio. The prospective Resurrection was killed permanently when Pressman was unable to pull Ballistic out of turnaround at Warner Brothers. Matt Greenberg, who wrote several projects for Dimension Films, was promptly hired to draft a new screenplay from scratch. Greenberg's proposal saw an eighteen year old sentenced to death after being wrongfully accused of murdering his girlfriend.

In August 1997, Pressman hired White Zombie musician Rob Zombie to write and direct The Crow: 2037. Much like prior Crow directors Alex Proyas and Tim Pope, Zombie had a background in directing music videos, a key factor in his hiring. Charlie Clouser of Nine Inch Nails was set to compose the film's score alongside Zombie, while manager Andy Gould was on board as an executive producer. Zombie's vision for 2037 veered away from the revenge narratives of the previous films and instead was a horror-tinged The Good, the Bad and the Ugly with Scott Glenn in mind for the lead role. Greenberg was invited back to the project to consult on 2037, calling it "kind of brilliant" but "in no way The Crow", a sentiment held by Pressman and Most. Zombie would exit the project due to his growing frustration with the film's producers. Zombie cited their lack of vision as the driving force behind his departure. When I Know What You Did Last Summer proved successful at the box office, The Crow's producers wanted Zombie to scrap his work and pivot to a teen cast with Skeet Ulrich as the Crow. By September 1998, the film was titled The Crow: Salvation, with Bharat Nalluri directing from a script by Chip Johannessen. Nalluri directed the low budget features Downtime and Killing Time; Johannessen primarily worked in television, scripting episodes for Millennium and Beverly Hills, 90210.

=== Pre-production ===
Kirsten Dunst was cast as the film's female lead, Erin Randall, in October. Dunst purposely did not watch the previous Crow films as to not influence her performance. In November 1998, Eric Mabius was in final negoitations for the film's lead role of Alex Corvis. Mabius once auditioned for the role of Eric Draven in The Crow, but was deemed too young for the role. The actor also auditioned for Michael Massee's role as Funboy who fired the dummy cartridge that killed Lee. Mabius underwent six weeks of martial arts training with David Lea. William Atherton, Grant Shaud, Jodi Lyn O'Keefe, Fred Ward, Dale Midkiff, Bill Mondy, Tim DeKay, Walton Goggins, and Don Shanks rounded out the supporting cast.

Pressman and Most wanted Salvation to stand on its own from the previous installments. The producers and Nalluri recruited Howard Berger and Alex Diaz of KNB EFX Group to handle the makeup effects. Berger and Diaz suggested shaving Mabius' head for the execution scene, but the idea was discarded. Dunst's character Erin Randall was also supposed to have more gruesome makeup work when the character's mouth is sewn shut, but the studio also vetoed this idea and demanded the makeup to be toned down. Maia Javan served as the film's production designer, filling in for series mainstay Alex McDowell.

=== Filming ===
Production on The Crow: Salvation began in February 1999 in Salt Lake City, Utah with Carolyn Chen as director of photography. Unlike the previous two films, The Crow: Salvation did not use miniaturized cityscapes to create its setting. Filming concluded in late March.

=== Post-production ===
Editing duties were handled by Howard E. Smith, known for his work on River's Edge, Near Dark, and The Abyss. Post-production was estimated to last until the end of 1999. In May 1999, the Writers Guild of America granted Johannessen sole writing credit. Greenberg, whose pitch was the template for Johannessen's screenplay, was given a co-producer credit for his work.

== Music ==
The Crow: Salvation soundtrack was released by Koch Records on April 28, 2000. The soundtrack was overseen by producer Jeff Most and featured artists and acts such as Rob Zombie, Hole, Danzig, Filter, The Flys, and Static-X.

The film's score was composed by Marco Beltrami, replacing Graeme Revell from the first two films. Beltrami's score was released by Koch Records on April 11, 2000.

== Release ==
=== Theatrical ===
The Crow: Salvation received a one week "test run" theatrical release in Spokane, Washington on September 15, 2000 before going direct to video on March 20, 2001 by Dimension Films. Released on DVD and VHS, the film became a commercial success. The film was once scheduled for release on Halloween 1999, March 31, 2000, April 21, 2000, and summer 2000. Due to Dimension frequently delaying Salvation, the film's soundtrack and score were released nearly a full year before the film itself.

Despite strong responses from test screenings and the approval of The Crow's creator James O'Barr, the Weinsteins were not confident in the film's commercial prospects. According to Most, Bob Weinstein in particular believed a Crow film headlined by a woman would be difficult to market, thus a proper theatrical release was completely written off.

=== Home media ===
On September 9, 2014, Lionsgate re-released the film on DVD. On October 7, 2014, it was released on DVD by Lionsgate in a triple feature edition with the other Crow sequels, The Crow: City of Angels and The Crow: Wicked Prayer. The Crow: Salvation was given a blu-ray release by Shout Factory on March 26, 2024.

== Reception ==
On review aggregator Rotten Tomatoes it has an 18% approval rating based on 11 reviews, only two being positive. The site's critical consensus reads: "The Crow: Salvation adds nothing new to the series and is plagued by bad acting and dialogue."

Lisa Nesselson of Variety responded positively to the film, opining that it was "a reasonably suspenseful, adequately made programmer" with a "calmly and wryly effective" protagonist and "efficient f/x artillery." JoBlo's Berge Garabedian gave the film a score of 4 out of 10, and concluded, "The film itself was definitely a little more entertaining than the second installment with some pretty slick gory death scenes, a loud but cool soundtrack, and a lead who doesn't throw you off with a cheesy accent. In fact, I credit Mabius for pulling off a decent outing despite my initial skepticism (A teen Crow? Never!). Unfortunately, you don't really care about ANY of the characters, especially the bad guys or the family left behind, so all you're basically left with is a low-rent Crow retread with a decent lead, a nice look, but plenty of bad dialogue, zero originality or depth." David Nusair of Reel Film Reviews had a similarly middling response to the film, giving it a score of 2 out 5, criticizing its casting and anemic violence, and writing, "While Salvation certainly isn't as bad as that first sequel, it still doesn't come near the sheer coolness of the first one."

Nathan Rabin of The A.V. Club lambasted the film as "a repugnant exercise in emptily stylish ultraviolence that plays like the longest, most expensive Rammstein video ever made" and closed his review of it with, "Dour and humorless even as its over-the-top violence and awful dialogue propel it to the realm of high camp, The Crow: Salvation marks a nadir for a series that was never especially good to begin with." Jonathan Barkan of Bloody Disgusting counted Salvation and Wicked Prayer as being among the worst horror films that he had ever seen, calling them "deplorable" before going on to say, "Both of them felt like lazy, slapdash, thoughtless, cash cows and that feeling permeates in every scene, oozing out of the celluloid like some damn viscous disease." Nick Perkins of Coming Soon was similarly derisive, ranking it as the worst in the series, and writing, "In theory, it's a good story. It should be, as it was written by Crow creator, James O'Barr. It's just the execution that left a lot to be desired. Mabius absolutely lacked the charisma that Brandon Lee possessed in spades. And though Kirsten Dunst also starred in this film, the supporting characters were generally as bland as the lead."

== Sequel ==
A standalone sequel, titled The Crow: Wicked Prayer, was released direct to video by Dimension Films on July 19, 2005. The film was directed by Six-String Samurai helmer Lance Mungia, from a script by Mungia, Jeff Most, and Sean Hood and received negative reviews.
