= The Crow (card game) =

Collectible card game

- Publishers: Heartbreaker Hobbies/Target Games
- Players: 2 or more
- Setup time: < 5 minutes
- Playing time: < 60 minutes

The Crow is an out-of-print collectible card game by Heartbreaker Press and Target Games.

== Description ==
The card game is based on The Crow comics by James O'Barr and depicted images from the film adaptation. The game did not have starter decks and instead it had a core set with 122 cards that included 10 foils that had artwork from the comic. The game was sold in booster packs of 15 cards, but no starter packs were available. A promo card called The Confident Crow was available by mail through proof-of-purchase order. An expansion titled Crow: City of Angels was announced for an October 1996 release but never materialized.

== Gameplay ==
Players control Angel, Devil, and Neutral Bystander cards and then send them into combat with "opposing [P]ersonalities". Action cards allow players to pump or hinder a Personality. Each Personality has an attack and defense value, as well as Virtue, which is equal to the highest value. Players play their card Personality card and discard cards from their hands equal to the Virtue of the played card, and then they attack. If a player has a higher attack value than their opponent's defense value, the opponent is wounded. If a Personality would be wounded again, it is killed. A player wins by killing 25 Virtue worth of an opponent's Personalities.

== Publication history ==
The Crow card game was released in November 1995 but initially had a release date of March 1995. It was one of three sets released by Heartbreaker Press and Target Games in November along with James Bond 007 and Kult.

== Reception ==
Wolfgang Baur reviewed The Crow in The Duelist #9 and said that "this is an easy game for experienced players to pick up and a good one to introduce newcomers to TCGs. It's worth a look for anyone looking for a simple game or a different flavor, but it's not for advanced players looking for new design innovations".

Andy Butcher reviewed The Crow for Arcane magazine, rating it a 6 out of 10 overall. Butcher comments that "The Crow is a simple game that would serve as a good introduction to CCGs. There's just enough depth to give it some skill, and the game mechanics are elegant. Experienced players may find it limiting and lacking in lasting appeal".
