= The Crow (franchise) =

American franchise, based on the comic book series by James O'Barr

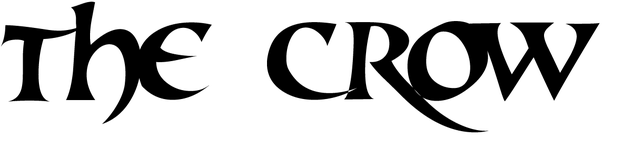
- Official franchise logo
- Created by: James O'Barr
- Original work: The Crow (1989)
- Owners: Film distribution: Paramount Pictures (through Miramax Films): 1–4 (1994–2005); Lionsgate: 5 (2024 reboot); Comics: Image (1989–1998) IDW Publishing (1998–1999)
- Years: 1989–present

Print publications
- Novel(s): The Crow (1995); The Crow: City of Angels (1996); The Crow: Quoth the Crow (1998); The Crow: The Lazarus Heart (1998); The Crow: Clash by Night (1998); The Crow: Temple of Night (1999); The Crow: Wicked Prayer (2000); The Crow: Hellbound (2001)
- Comics: The Crow (1989); The Crow: Dead Time (1996); The Crow: Flesh & Blood (1996); The Crow: City of Angels (1996); The Crow: Wild Justice (1996); The Crow: Waking Nightmares (1997–1998); The Crow/Razor: Kill the Pain (1998); The Crow (1999)

Films and television
- Film(s): The Crow (1994); The Crow: City of Angels (1996); The Crow: Salvation (2000); The Crow: Wicked Prayer (2005); The Crow (2024)
- Television series: The Crow: Stairway to Heaven (1998–1999)

Games
- Video game(s): The Crow: City of Angels (1997)

Audio
- Soundtrack(s): The Crow (1994); The Crow: City of Angels (1996); The Crow: Salvation (2000); The Crow (2024)

The Crow is an American media franchise based on the limited comic book series of the same name created by James O'Barr. Since then, there have been five released films and a television series, as well as a video game.

== Films ==
Film	U.S. release date	Film Distributor	Director	Screenwriter(s)	Producers
The Crow	May 13, 1994	Dimension; Miramax	Alex Proyas	David J. Schow and John Shirley	Edward R. Pressman & Jeff Most
The Crow: City of Angels	August 30, 1996	Miramax	Tim Pope	David S. Goyer	Edward R. Pressman & Jeff Most
The Crow: Salvation	January 23, 2000	Dimension	Bharat Nalluri	Chip Johannessen	Edward R. Pressman & Jeff Most
The Crow: Wicked Prayer	July 19, 2005	Dimension	Lance Mungia	Lance Mungia, Jeff Most and Sean Hood	Edward R. Pressman & Jeff Most
The Crow	August 23, 2024	Lionsgate	Rupert Sanders	Zach Baylin and Will Schneider	Edward R. Pressman, Molly Hassell, Victor Hadida, John Jencks & Samuel Hadida

== Television ==
Series	Season	Episodes	Originally released		Network
Series	Season	Episodes	First released	Last released	Network
The Crow: Stairway to Heaven	1	22	September 25, 1998	May 22, 1999	Syndication

== Cancelled projects ==
=== The Crow: The Bride ===
In the 90s, James O'Barr wanted to pursue a female-led installment of The Crow called The Crow: The Bride which would have followed a woman killed on her wedding day who would return seeking revenge. O'Barr had been inspired by a news story he had read in which Chicago gangsters robbing a church ended up at a wedding where a shoot out occurred with one of the guests who was an off-duty cop and 13 people were killed. When O'Barr pitched the concept to Miramax it was rejected as they did not believe audiences would pay to see an action film with a female lead.

=== The Crow: 2037 ===
Initial development on a third Crow film was announced in August 1997, when Rob Zombie was attached to make a directorial debut with The Crow: 2037. White Zombie covered the KC and the Sunshine Band hit "I'm Your Boogie Man" for the soundtrack of The Crow: City of Angels, and after seeing Rob Zombie's work on the video he produced for the song, Edward Pressman offered Zombie the opportunity to helm the third Crow film. Had the film been made, Zombie planned to shift focus in tone from the revenge angle of the previous two entries to a more horror-based approach. The film would have begun in 2010, when a young boy and his mother are murdered on Halloween night by a Satanic priest. A year later, the boy is resurrected as the Crow. Twenty-seven years later, and unaware of his past, he has become a bounty hunter on a collision course with his now all-powerful killer. While producers responded favorably to Zombie's proposal for a third "The Crow" film, producers Pressman and Most ultimately decided it wasn't the best fit for a Crow film and was better served as a standalone work. Zombie himself spoke of his frustration with experience after spending 18 months working on the film often dealing with the indecisiveness of the producers who according to him would change their mind as to what they wanted on any given day which ultimately lead to Zombie leaving the project.

=== The Crow: Lazarus ===
In July 2000, rapper DMX had been in discussions with producers about a fourth Crow film titled The Crow: Lazarus about a rapper who chooses to leave the music scene for the love of a woman and is killed during a drive-by shooting. The rapper is then reincarnated as The Crow in order to take revenge on the gang responsible for his death. Production had been slated to begin in November of that year, but the project ultimately never came to be.

== Cast ==
Characters	Original series				Reboot	Television series
Characters	The Crow	The Crow: City of Angels	The Crow: Salvation	The Crow: Wicked Prayer	The Crow	The Crow: Stairway to Heaven
Characters	1994	1996	2000	2005	2024	1998–1999
Eric Draven/The Crow	Brandon Lee	Mentioned			Bill Skarsgård Solo Uniacke^{Y}	Mark Dacascos
Sarah Mohr	Rochelle Davis	Mia Kirshner				Katie Stuart
Sergeant Albrecht	Ernie Hudson					Marc Gomes
Top Dollar	Michael Wincott					John Pyper-Ferguson
Shelly Webster	Sofia Shinas				FKA Twigs	Sabine Karsenti
Darla Mohr	Anna Levine					Lynda Boyd
Tin-Tin	Laurence Mason					Darcy Laurie
Funboy	Michael Massee					Ty Olsson
Ashe Corven/The Crow		Vincent Pérez				
Judah Earl		Richard Brooks				
Curve		Iggy Pop				
Alexander "Alex" Frederick Corvis/The Crow			Eric Mabius			
Erin Randall			Kirsten Dunst			
Lauren Randall			Jodi Lyn O'Keefe			
Nathan Randall			William Atherton			
Police Captain John L. Book			Fred Ward			
James "Jimmy" Cuervo/The Crow				Edward Furlong		
Luc "Death" Crash				David Boreanaz		
Lola Byrne				Tara Reid		
Lilly "Ignites the Dawn"				Emmanuelle Chriqui		
El Niño				Dennis Hopper		
Vincent Roeg					Danny Huston	
Sophia Webster					Josette Simon	
Marian					Laura Birn	
Kronos					Sami Bouajila	
Zadie					Isabella Wei	
Chance					Jordan Bolger	

== Crew ==
Crew for the Crow film and television series
Crew	Film				
Crew	The Crow	The Crow: City of Angels	The Crow: Salvation	The Crow: Wicked Prayer	The Crow
Crew	1994	1996	2000	2005	2024
Composer	Graeme Revell	Graeme Revell	Marco Beltrami	Jamie Christopherson	Volker Bertelmann
Director of Photography	Dariusz Wolski	Jean-Yves Escoffier	Carolyn Chen	Kurt Brabbee	Steve Annis
Editor(s)	Dov Hoenig; M. Scott Smith	Michael N. Knue; Anthony Redman	Howard E. Smith	Dean Holland	Jason Ballantine
Production company	Dimension Films; Entertainment Media Investment Corporation; Pressman Film; Jeff Most Productions	Dimension Films	IMF; Edward R. Pressman Film Corporation; Jeff Most Productions; Miramax; Pacifica Film Development	Pressman Film; Jeff Most Productions; Fubu Films	Davis Films; Hassell Free Productions; Electric Shadow Co.; Pressman Film; Ashland Hill Media Finance
Distributor	Miramax Films	Miramax Films	Dimension Films	Dimension Films	Lionsgate; FilmNation Entertainment

== Reception ==
=== Box office performance ===
Film	Release date	Box office gross			Budget	Reference
Film	Release date	US/Canada	Other territories	Worldwide	Budget	Reference
The Crow	May 13, 1994	$50,693,129	$43,000,000	$93,693,129	$23 million	
The Crow: City of Angels	August 30, 1996	$17,917,287	$6,931,174	$24,848,461	$13 million	
The Crow: Salvation	January 23, 2000	—N/a	—N/a	—N/a	$10 million	
The Crow: Wicked Prayer	June 3, 2005	—N/a	—N/a	—N/a	—N/a	
The Crow	August 23, 2024	$9,275,659	$14,833,377	$24,109,036	$50 million	
Total		$77,886,075	$64,764,551	$142,650,626	$96 million	

=== Critical response ===
Film	Rotten Tomatoes	Metacritic
The Crow (1994)	84% (63 reviews)	71 (14 reviews)
The Crow: City of Angels	11% (36 reviews)	—N/a
The Crow: Salvation	18% (11 reviews)	—N/a
The Crow: Wicked Prayer	0% (9 reviews)	—N/a
The Crow (2024)	21% (134 reviews)	30 (31 reviews)
