= The Crow (2024 film) =

Film by Rupert Sanders

- Theatrical release poster
- Directed by: Rupert Sanders
- Screenplay by: Zach Baylin; William Schneider
- Based on: The Crow by James O'Barr (Note: Additional literary material credited to David J. Schow and John Shirley (for the 1994 film screenplay), and Aaron Rabin.)
- Produced by: Edward R. Pressman; Molly Hassell; John Jencks; Victor Hadida; Samuel Hadida
- Starring: Bill Skarsgård; FKA Twigs; Danny Huston
- Cinematography: Steve Annis
- Edited by: Neil Smith; Chris Dickens
- Music by: Volker Bertelmann
- Production companies: FilmNation Entertainment; Hassell Free Productions; The Electric Shadow Company; Davis Films; Pressman Film; 30West; Ashland Hill Media Finance; Maze Pictures; Occupant Entertainment
- Distributed by: Lionsgate Films (United States); Entertainment Film Distributors (United Kingdom); Metropolitan Filmexport (France)
- Release dates: August 21, 2024 (France); August 23, 2024 (United States and United Kingdom)
- Running time: 111 minutes
- Countries: United States; United Kingdom; France
- Language: English
- Budget: $50 million
- Box office: $24.1 million

The Crow is a 2024 gothic supernatural superhero film serving as a reboot and the fifth installment overall in The Crow film series based on the 1989 comic book series by James O'Barr. (Note: Several sources have identified the film as a "remake", but Skarsgård's interview with Esquire noted that "Skarsgård echoes the sentiment that the movie's marketing team has shared elsewhere: this is not a remake of the earlier film but instead a second adaptation of the graphic novel".) It was directed by Rupert Sanders from a screenplay by Zach Baylin and William Schneider. A co-production between France, the United States and the United Kingdom, the film stars Bill Skarsgård as Eric / The Crow, a man who is resurrected to avenge the deaths of himself and his girlfriend, played by FKA Twigs.

The film entered development in December 2008, with Stephen Norrington stating that he would write and direct a "reinvention" of The Crow. It entered a complicated production process with various directors, screenwriters, and cast members attached at various points. Filmmakers Norrington, Juan Carlos Fresnadillo, F. Javier Gutiérrez, and Corin Hardy were initially signed to direct while Bradley Cooper, Luke Evans, Jack Huston, and Jason Momoa were all cast as Eric during various points in development. Skarsgård was announced as Eric in April 2022, along with Sanders as director. Filming began in July, occurring in Prague and Penzing near Munich.

The Crow had its world premiere in New York City on August 20, 2024, and was released in France on August 21 by Metropolitan Filmexport, and in the United States and United Kingdom on August 23 by Lionsgate and Entertainment Film Distributors respectively. It received negative reviews from critics and was a box-office bomb, grossing $24.1 million worldwide against a production budget of $50 million.

== Plot ==
Eric, an addict with a troubled childhood, struggles with life and nightmares at a rehabilitation center. Shelly, a musician with similar issues, receives a video on her cell phone from her friend Zadie that incriminates Vincent Roeg, a crime lord posing as a musical aristocrat. Choosing to save the video, despite knowing that possessing it would lead to her death, Shelly attempts to go into hiding but is immediately pursued by Roeg's henchmen. They break their pursuit when Shelly is arrested for drug possession.

Zadie is captured and interrogated by Roeg. He reveals that, centuries earlier, he had made a pact with the Devil to send innocent souls to Hell in exchange for eternal life. He forces Zadie to kill herself by whispering incantations in her ear. Shelly is sent to the same rehab center where Eric is situated. The two become smitten with each other and bond over time. When Marion, Roeg's right-hand woman, suddenly appears at the institution, Shelly panics and convinces Eric to help her escape. They take refuge in the vacant house of one of Shelly's friends, and the two quickly fall in love and attempt to live a carefree life together, but are soon found by Roeg's men and murdered.

Eric awakens in a purgatory-like rail yard where Kronos, a spirit guide, explains that Eric will have to kill Roeg to be reunited with Shelly. Revived, Eric discovers that he possesses the ability to heal from injuries, but can still be hurt or killed. He first kills Detective Milch, a corrupt cop on Roeg's payroll, and attempts to force another hitman, Lex, to give up names, but winds up killing him. Eric visits Sophia, Shelly's mother, who was present with Marion at the rehab center. Sophia reveals that she made a deal with Roeg: wealth in exchange for Shelly's soul. After Eric leaves, Roeg visits Sophia to inquire about Eric but forces her to jump off the roof when she revealed she regretted their deal. Eric meets with Shelly's friend, Chance, who presents him Shelly's phone with the incriminating video revealing that Roeg had previously compelled Shelly to kill a woman. Roeg learns of Eric's supernatural abilities and orders Marion to capture him alive in order to seize Eric's powers. Suddenly doubting his love for Shelly, Eric loses his ability to heal and is again killed by Roeg's enforcer, Wickham, who was supposed to take him alive, and Chance is killed, too. Returned to the afterlife, Kronos warns Eric that their love has to be pure and calls it off, so Eric makes a deal with Kronos to take Shelly's place in Hell in exchange for another chance to kill Roeg. The crows agree as Kronos bestows Eric with Black Blood, giving Eric immense power and the ability to move between worlds.

Eric reawakens and kills off Wickham and his hit team, then tracks Marion to an opera house, savagely killing all of Roeg's men to reach her. Marion reluctantly discloses Roeg's location before Eric decapitates her and her bodyguard, Roman. Eric interrupts the opera's final bow as he tosses their heads from the stage into the audience. Eric finally reaches Roeg's estate where Roeg subdues Eric and attempts to steal his powers before Eric transports them both to the afterlife, where he quickly finishes Roeg and saves Shelly's soul.

After a brief reunion between the lovers, Shelly is revived on the night of their deaths and mourns for Eric after Kronos, disguised as a medic, tells her that he gave his life for her. Eric accepts his fate, content in his belief that their souls will one day find each other again.

== Cast ==
- Bill Skarsgård as Eric Draven / The Crow
  - Solo Uniacke as Young Eric
- FKA Twigs as Shelly Webster, Eric's girlfriend
- Danny Huston as Vincent Roeg, a crime lord and a sorcerer
- Josette Simon as Sophia Webster, Shelly's mother
- Laura Birn as Marion, Roeg's right-hand woman
- Trigga as Lex, an enforcer and driver working for Roeg
- Karel Dobrý as Roman, a hitman and Marion's bodyguard
- David Bowles as Wickham, an enforcer working for Roeg
- Sami Bouajila as Kronos, a spirit that guides Eric in his mission
- Isabella Wei as Zadie, Shelly's friend
- Jordan Bolger as Chance, a tattoo artist and friend of Eric and Shelly
- Dukagjin Podrimaj as Detective Milch, a corrupt cop working for Roeg

== Production ==
=== Development ===
==== Stephen Norrington and Juan Carlos Fresnadillo ====
Three years after the franchise's last entry, the direct-to-video film The Crow: Wicked Prayer, producer Edward R. Pressman and Relativity Media decided on a revitalization of the series; hiring Stephen Norrington to write and direct in December 2008. The film was to be Norrington's first directorial effort after 2003's The League of Extraordinary Gentlemen. Alex Proyas, director of the original film, was quick to protest the film upon its announcement, and continued to criticize further attempts at remaking The Crow. In a statement to Variety, Norrington said "Whereas Alex Proyas' original was gloriously gothic and stylized, the new movie will be realistic, hard-edged and mysterious, almost documentary-style". Norrington submitted his script by October 2009, which was warmly received by the studio. The next month, producer Ryan Kavanaugh expressed enthusiasm over the project, and called it a "relaunch of the franchise". Norrington's vision explored the Crow's mythology and would not feature the character of Eric Draven. Robert Stromberg was enlisted for production design while location scouting was underway in June 2010. Production was scheduled for a summer 2010 start. Norrington looked to film in the American Southwest as well as Detroit or Philadelphia. By July, Australian musician Nick Cave was handling rewrites. Mark Wahlberg was offered the film's title role in October; the same month Norrington stepped out of the project, citing creative differences. The Crow suffered another setback when Wahlberg backed out of the film the following month.

By February 2011, negotiations started with Before the Fall filmmaker F. Javier Gutiérrez and 28 Weeks Later director Juan Carlos Fresnadillo to helm the project. Fresnadillo was officially on board by April, now joined by Enrique Lopez Lavigne of Apaches Entertainment and series mainstay Jeff Most producing. Norrington and Cave's script was expected to be discarded in favor of a page one rewrite. The film, now billed as a remake, began to pick up steam. Talks with Bradley Cooper began in earnest that same month, while production was slated to begin in the fall. Fresnadillo's adaptation would have cost an estimated $70 million.

==== Legal issues and further developments at Relativity Media ====
Days after Fresnadillo's hiring, Harvey Weinstein and Bob Weinstein sued Relativity Media, claiming the studio breached a 2009 contract by shopping the film to other distributors. The Weinsteins alleged their studio, The Weinstein Company, held the remake's worldwide distribution rights. Relativity Media claimed not only did the Weinsteins "botch" the release of Nine, but they also "refused to pay Relativity the money owed to it under the agreements with the parties," which led Relativity Media to seek out a new distributor. In June 2011, Relativity Media issued a statement declaring victory over The Weinstein Company. That same month, Watchmen scribe Alex Tse was writing the script. Fresnadillo moved onto developing a Highlander remake, and Cooper would soon follow. With Cooper gone, the studio considered Mark Wahlberg and Channing Tatum for Eric.

The Weinstein Company and Relativity Media reached a settlement in January 2012, agreeing to "work on the film together as planned.” F. Javier Gutiérrez signed on to direct, while Jesse Wigutow was scripting new pages. Gutiérrez wanted to avoid doing a direct remake of 1994 adaptation, believing it to be "perfect". Instead the director planned for a "page-for-page adaptation" of the comic book. Gutiérrez felt the only way to bring the soul of the comic book was to involve its creator James O'Barr with the film. O'Barr was publicly against remaking the film, saying "Brandon Lee was a friend, and I'd never do anything to hurt his legacy". However, O'Barr was won over by Gutiérrez's vision and boarded the film as a creative consultant. Cliff Dorfman, a Crow "purist", was drafting a new screenplay from the ground up under Gutiérrez's supervision. Producer Robbie Brenner described Dorfman's screenplay as "grounded" and "character driven". Filming was aiming to begin in early 2014. James McAvoy and Tom Hiddleston were early contenders to play Eric Draven. Early talks with Hiddleston started in April 2013, with the actor performing his own makeup test after meeting with the project's producers. However, Mike Fleming Jr. at Deadline Hollywood described the reporting of Hiddleston's involvement as "a simple conversation has been overhyped and reported like it was going to happen," and indicated that Alexander Skarsgard was the top choice to play Draven. In May, Luke Evans was cast as Eric. Meanwhile, Gutiérrez was in the midst of casting Forest Whitaker as the film's villain and courting production designer Bo Welch, effects artist Rick Baker, musician Atticus Ross and makeup designer Bill Corso. By the summer, another lawsuit struck the project when producer Jeff Most sued Pressman for allegedly breaching his pay-or-play deal in 2011.

Producers briefly considered Kristen Stewart as Shelly, and by November 2013, Norman Reedus was up for a role. Location scouting was taking place in New Orleans, Louisiana and later in the United Kingdom. When it became clear that development was at a standstill, Gutiérrez left The Crow in favor of Rings in July 2014. Dorfman and O'Barr remained on board, eventually collaborating on further revisions of the script. Despite Gutiérrez's departure, Pressman reaffirmed that production was still on track for spring 2015.

Corin Hardy was selected to helm The Crow at year's end in 2014. Hardy's debut film, The Hallow, was set to premiere at the Sundance Film Festival just a month later. Dorfman's script, which at this point had been greenlit three separate times, was expected to be retained and Gutiérrez would receive an executive producer credit. By this time, Evans was no longer involved due to scheduling conflicts. By early 2015, Jack Huston and Jessica Brown Findlay were in place to portray Eric and Shelly, while Andrea Riseborough was slated to take on the role of Top Dollar. Hardy released Dorfman off the project and oversaw new script developments respectively from Claire Wilson and his The Hallow co-writer Felipe Marino. According to Dorfman, despite being dismissed, his draft was the one sent out to actors when Hardy was casting the film. Production was gearing up to take place at Pinewood Studios by March. Forest Whitaker returned to the project in June 2015, he was expected to join the film after completing Arrival and before Rogue One: A Star Wars Story. All the while, scheduling conflicts would prevent Huston from staying on board. Jack O'Connell and Nicholas Hoult were considered as possible replacements.

==== Relativity Media's bankruptcy and other complications ====
In July 2015, Relativity Media filed for Chapter 11 bankruptcy. Though pre-production came to a stop and "several" heads of production had left the film, Relativity Media still considered The Crow a "top priority"; even rejecting several offers from other studios to purchase the franchise's rights. Further obstacles arose when producer Edward R. Pressman filed an objection against Relativity Media, accusing the studio of lacking the resources to properly finance the film and its theatrical release. Hardy remained attached nonetheless, having signed a holding deal with the studio amidst Pressman's filing. Dana Brunetti was appointed President of Relativity Media in January 2016 and temporarily removed Hardy as director the succeeding March.

Hardy returned to The Crow by June, bringing in actor Jason Momoa. In September 2016, filming was reported to begin in January 2017. By November, The Crow was shifted from Relativity Media to Davis Films and Highland Film Group. Filming was still on track for 2017, under the new title, The Crow Reborn. Hardy, Momoa, and Pressman regrouped in the summer, while O'Barr was involved "in every aspect of the film" by October.

==== Failed startup at Sony Pictures and revival ====
The Crow Reborn was picked up by Sony Pictures in September 2017. Samuel Hadida was set to produce the film. Hardy and Momoa were not attached at the time of the acquisition, but the studio was optimistic to reattach both. Sony dated the film for October 11, 2019, with Momoa starring and Hardy directing. Momoa began preparation for The Crow Reborn immediately after wrapping filming on the DC Extended Universe (DCEU) film Aquaman. By May 2018, the film was in pre-production and was five weeks away from production in Budapest. However, tensions between Hardy and Hadida concluded with the director and Momoa leaving the film. Hardy called his decision to leave "hardest decision of all". By July, the project was abandoned by Sony, having pulled the film from its release date entirely.

In January 2020, Davis Films and Highland Film Group kickstarted development once again. The film, shortened back to The Crow, began searching for a new writer and director. Both Gutiérrez and Dorfman expressed an interest in returning to the film. O'Barr, however, changed his tune on remaking The Crow, calling it "not necessary". In March 2022, Pressman reaffirmed that the film was still a priority and that a finished deal with a director and star was near. The following month, Rupert Sanders and Zach Baylin were announced as director and writer. In April, Bill Skarsgård and FKA Twigs were cast as Eric and Shelly.

=== Pre-production ===
Sanders set out to make a film that stood alone from the 1994 adaptation. "This is not a remake. It is wildly different," he told Entertainment Weekly. Instead the filmmaker drew inspiration from A Matter of Life and Death, Jacob's Ladder and the works of Edgar Allan Poe. The director said the script was a "work in progress" when he signed on. William Schneider handled script revisions. Schneider, a fan of the original film, aimed to pay homage to Proyas' adaptation while finding a new way into the story with its own voice. Sanders was attracted to the themes of grief and morality when creating the film, wanting to create a "dark romance". This prompted him to expand the role of Shelly, calling her the "emotional engine of the film". While the director was inspired by the music of The Cure, he also wanted to update The Crow for modern audiences. He modeled his take on Eric from squat ravers in London as well as modern artists like Post Malone and Lil Peep. Sanders described Eric as "a normal guy" who "hasn’t gone to a martial arts class". He worked with stunt coordinator Adam Horton to craft "brawly" and "scrappy" action sequences to emphasize this. Twigs and Skarsgård did not perform together prior to filming, but attending a dinner on set while filming in Prague as Sanders was confident in their acting abilities. Danny Huston was cast as Vincent Roeg, the film's villain, while Isabella Wei signed on to play Zadie, a supporting role.

Sanders called The Crow "an origin story", while producer Sam Pressman was hopeful the film would spark an extended universe.

=== Filming ===
Principal photography commenced on July 13, 2022, in Prague, Czech Republic with Steve Annis serving as director of photography. Paperwork filed from the film's production falsely identified the project as a six-episode television series. Filming was previously set to commence in June 2022, shooting in Prague and Munich. To ensure the safety and comfort of all the cast and crew in light of the 1994 film's shooting incident as well as the then-recent similar incident on Rust, Sanders met with the special effects department and armorer in Prague the first day and told them that no firing weapons would be used on his set, using airsoft guns instead even though it cost them a bit of the very limited visual effects budget's money to add a muzzle flash and smoke, with Sanders feeling that the film's visual effects were very much in-camera and shot at a location with set extension. While in Prague, Twigs developed the concept for her third studio album Eusexua. On September 16, 2022, the film wrapped production.

Skarsgård surprised Sanders with his diet conditions, which involved a pound of steak tartare daily. Skarsgård arrived directly from shooting Boy Kills World and worked four straight months with no complaints and very few free days, even doing a scene where he was covered in black syrup, despite it being the last night. Since filming had wrapped, Skarsgård had felt a certain distance from the film, due to the ending. When asked about this during his Esquire Magazine interview, he mentioned how the ending made the path for a sequel easier, stating "I personally preferred something more definitive".

=== Post-production ===
Editing duties took place in London where they were handled by Neil Smith and Chris Dickens. In September 2022, virtual production on the film occurred at Penzing Studios, in Penzing, Germany, while the digital asset creation and VFX work occurred in Bavaria, Germany. The film is the first major international production to shoot at the studio. By November 2022, Ashland Hill Media had financed the film's post-production.

In April 2024, writing credits were designated to Zach Baylin and William Schneider; additional literary material credits were given to Aaron Rabin as well as David J. Schow and John Shirley, credited screenwriters on the original film.

Media Capital Technologies co-financed the film.

== Release ==
=== Theatrical ===
The Crow was theatrically released in France by Metropolitan Filmexport on August 21, 2024, and in the United States and United Kingdom on August 23, 2024, by Lionsgate Films and Entertainment Film Distributors, respectively. It was originally scheduled for June 7, 2024. Lionsgate acquired the film's distribution rights for $10 million and spent $15 million on print and advertising. FilmNation Entertainment co-financed the film and sold the international distribution rights to various buyers at the Cannes Film Festival in May 2022.

=== Home media ===
On September 10, 2024, Lionsgate Home Entertainment announced that The Crow would be released on premium video-on-demand platforms and digital distribution on September 13, 2024.

== Reception ==
=== Box office ===
As of May 24, 2025, The Crow has grossed $9.3 million in the United States and Canada, and $14.8 million in other territories, for a worldwide total of $24.1 million.

In the United States and Canada, The Crow was released alongside Blink Twice and The Forge, and was initially projected to gross $6–9 million from 2,752 theaters in its opening weekend. After making $2 million on its first day, including an estimated $650,000 from Thursday night previews, projections were lowered to $4.5–5 million. The film went on to debut to $4.6 million, finishing eighth at the box office. Deadline called the opening "disastrous", noting that the original film opened to $11.7 million in 1994 ($35.5 million in 2024 adjusted for inflation). Kotaku blamed the film's performance on the general lack of popularity of the film series, noting that except for the 1994 film, the others in the series were unsuccessful. The film dropped out of the box office top ten in its second weekend with $1.8 million.

=== Critical response ===
The Crow received negative reviews from critics. On the review aggregator website Rotten Tomatoes, 22% of 138 critics' reviews are positive, with an average rating of 4.3/10. The website's consensus reads: "Dreary and poorly paced, this reimagining of The Crow doesn't have enough personality or pulse to merit the resurrection." Metacritic, which uses a weighted average, assigned the film a score of 30 out of 100, based on 31 critics, indicating "generally unfavorable" reviews. Audiences polled by CinemaScore gave the film an average grade of "B–" on an A+ to F scale, while those at PostTrak gave it a 47% overall positive score (with an average of 1.5 out of 5 stars), with 36% saying they would definitely recommend it.

Benjamin Lee of The Guardian wrote: "It was no real surprise that a tortured update of 1994's cursed goth revenge thriller The Crow would be a misfire – it's been in development since 2008 with multiple directors and actors attached ever since – but it's genuinely startling just how utterly wretched the finished product is and how unfit it is for a wide release." Alison Willmore of Vulture was critical of the overall production and commented upon the acting, saying that "Skarsgård and Twigs have a total absence of chemistry, and while she's adequate in what's still basically a dead-wife role, he's shockingly inert for someone with a career built almost entirely on characters at the intersection of creepy and hottie." Another negative review came from Empire, who rated the film 1 out of 5, finishing by calling it "a turkey in crow's clothing". Other negative reviews were published in Screen Daily and Mashable.

On a positive note, Rafer Guzmán opined that The Crow was "an improvement on the 1994 film version", adding that it "feels less like a comic-book movie and more like an edgy romance from a hip studio like A24 or Neon." Guzmán also praised the climactic action sequence in the opera house. In a more mixed review, CGMagazine wrote: "At the end of the night, The Crow (2024) isn't the worst movie of the year, and if you're a fan of the comic series or are a fan of Bill Skarsgård, you'll likely walk out of The Crow with a big grin on your face. For everyone else, however, the latest adaptation of the dark anti-hero kind of just feels like another R-rated take on the oversaturated superhero genre that plagues modern movie theatres everywhere." A mixed review in The Ringer concluded: "And while the Crow reboot, like any film, ought to be viewed with an open mind, it's hard not to feel like the franchise should have ended with the original film's send-off." Matt Zoller Seitz offered qualified praise in his review for RogerEbert.com, writing that "for all its disappointments and missteps—including a lack of imaginative compositions, and some muddy or milky nighttime photography—the movie's got something—a specialness, an aura, or maybe just an obvious purity of intent—that ought to inoculate it against charges that it's just a cash-grab remake."

=== Response from 1994 film's crew ===
Director Alex Proyas and actress Rochelle Davis, who played Sarah, both refused to see the reboot out of respect for Brandon Lee's legacy (Lee portrayed Eric/The Crow in the 1994 film of the same name), with Proyas dismissing the reboot as a "cynical cash-grab". Sofia Shinas, who played Shelly in the original, also expressed her disappointment in the reboot, while Ernie Hudson, who played Sergeant Albrecht, expressed mixed feelings. (Note: Attributed to multiple sources.)

=== Accolades ===
Year	Award / Film Festival	Category	Recipient(s)	Result	Ref.
2025	Golden Raspberry Awards	Worst Remake, Rip-off or Sequel	The Crow	Nominated	
2025	Golden Raspberry Awards	Worst Supporting Actress	FKA Twigs	Nominated	

== Possible sequel ==
According to Skarsgård, the original ending was changed by the filmmakers to invoke the possibility of a sequel, despite his reservations.
