= The Crow: Salvation (soundtrack) =

Soundtrack album by Various
- Released: April 28, 2000
- Genres: Alternative rock, Heavy metal, Industrial rock, Gothic rock, Hip hop
- Length: 71:19
- Label: Koch Records
- Producer: Jeff Most

Professional ratings
Review scores
| Source | Rating |
|---|---|
| AllMusic | 2.5/5 stars |

The soundtrack to the third in the Crow film series, The Crow: Salvation album is once again compiled and produced by Jeff Most. As with the soundtrack to The Crow: City of Angels, Salvation includes an otherwise unavailable cover version by Hole: this time of Bob Dylan's "It's All Over Now, Baby Blue". Several other contemporary big-name artists are also included, indicating that even at this late stage in the series, The Crow brand name still held a certain cache within the grunge / industrial / gothic rock scene. This would not extend to the fourth film, The Crow: Wicked Prayer however, for which no soundtrack album was ever released.

In the UK, the release of The Crow: Salvation's soundtrack pre-dated the release of the film itself by four years. The film was finally released straight to DVD in 2004.

The Juliette Lewis track is not an example of the actress' recent Juliette and the Licks project. The song is primarily performed by The Infidels, but features a sample of Lewis singing "Born Bad", taken from the film Natural Born Killers.

== Track listing ==
1. "The Best Things (Exclusive Radio Mix)" - Filter (3:38)
2. "Living Dead Girl (The Naked Exorcism Remix)" - Rob Zombie (4:10)
3. "Bad Brother" (feat. Juliette Lewis) - The Infidels (5:23)
4. "Warm Winter" - Kid Rock (4:05)
5. "It's All Over Now, Baby Blue" (Bob Dylan cover) - Hole (3:37)
6. "What You Want" - The Flys (3:26)
7. "Big God" - Monster Magnet (5:58)
8. "Painful" - Sin (3:51)
9. "Antihistamine (Forgotten By The World Remix)" - Tricky (4:38)
10. "Independent Slaves" - Days of the New (4:36)
11. "Everything Sucks (Again)" - Pitchshifter (4:27)
12. "Waking Up Beside You (Remix)" - Stabbing Westward (6:00)
13. "Now Is The Time (The Crystal Method Millennium Remix)" - The Crystal Method (5:36)
14. "Burning Inside" (feat. Burton C. Bell of Fear Factory) (Ministry cover) - Static-X (4:13)
15. "Rusted Wings" - New American Shame (3:32)
16. "Underbelly of the Beast (Remix of 'Belly of the Beast')" - Danzig (4:07)
