= The Crow: Original Motion Picture Score =

Film score by Graeme Revell
- Released: 14 June 1994; 1 October 2021 (Deluxe Edition)
- Genres: Film score; world music; industrial rock
- Length: 49:13; 99:25 (Deluxe Edition)
- Label: Varèse Sarabande

Deluxe Edition

Graeme Revell chronology
No Escape (1994)	The Crow: Original Motion Picture Score (1994)	Street Fighter (1994)

The Crow: Original Motion Picture Score contains original music written by Graeme Revell for the film The Crow. It was released in 1994. It should not be confused with the soundtrack album, The Crow, which showcases the film's music by popular artists.

The score consists of mostly orchestral music, with some electronic and guitar elements, like the noteworthy song "Inferno" featured in the iconic scene where the title character performs a guitar solo on a rooftop on Devil's Night.

In 2021 a deluxe edition was released, featuring the complete score plus an additional 30 minutes of unreleased material, largely consisting of early takes that were later incorporated into Revell's score for The Crow: City of Angels.

In retrospect, composer Graeme Revell said: "This perhaps my signature work – it is one of the most copied scores ever I think. Most gothic, religious or horror/thriller scores now contain most of these elements; world music, ethnic female and male voices, industrial percussion etc."

== Track listing ==
All tracks are written by Graeme Revell.

No.	Title	Length
1.	"Birth of the Legend"	6:16
2.	"Resurrection"	2:10
3.	"The Crow Descends"	2:30
4.	"Remembrance"	2:54
5.	"Rain Forever"	2:32
6.	""Her Eyes... So Innocent""	2:45
7.	"Tracking the Prey"	3:35
8.	"Pain and Retribution"	2:34
9.	"Believe in Angels"	3:31
10.	"Captive Child"	2:32
11.	"Devil's Night"	2:30
12.	"On Hallowed Ground"	2:42
13.	"Inferno"	5:02
14.	"Return to the Grave"	3:45
15.	"Last Rites"	3:55

== Deluxe edition track listing ==
=== Disc One ===
All tracks are written by Graeme Revell.

No.	Title	Length
1.	"Birth of the Legend"	6:17
2.	"Forever"	1:29
3.	"Absolution Accepted"	2:26
4.	"Despair"	1:37
5.	"Resurrection"	2:09
6.	"Never Ever Fear"	3:43
7.	"Inertia"	1:48
8.	"Pain and the Shadows"	0:41
9.	"The Crow Descends"	2:31
10.	"A Cold October Night"	1:08
11.	"Remembrance"	2:54
12.	"Rain Forever"	2:32
13.	"Shattered in the Head"	0:44
14.	""Her Eyes... So Innocent""	2:45
15.	"Tracking the Prey"	3:35
16.	"Elegy"	0:32
17.	"The Tides of Sin"	2:07
18.	"Pain and Retribution"	2:34
19.	"Angels All Fire"	1:16
20.	"Believe in Angels"	3:32

=== Disc Two ===
All tracks are written by Graeme Revell, except "It Can't Rain All the Time" lyrics by Jane Siberry.

No.	Title	Length
1.	"Respect to the Living"	3:25
2.	"Truth to the Dead"	0:55
3.	"Killing Time"	1:24
4.	"A Vision from Hell"	1:52
5.	"Captive Child"	2:32
6.	"Devil's Night"	2:30
7.	"Innocent Lovers"	2:13
8.	"On Hallowed Ground"	2:42
9.	"Twisted Wreckage"	3:13
10.	"Inferno"	5:03
11.	"Eyes Like Candy"	3:25
12.	"Irony"	1:14
13.	"Legacy of Brutality"	1:49
14.	"Watching You Forever"	2:27
15.	"Angel from Hell"	4:04
16.	"Praying for Rain"	0:47
17.	"Return to Grave"	3:45
18.	"Last Rites"	3:54
19.	"Destroy Myself"	1:45
20.	"End Titles: It Can't Rain All the Time (featuring Jane Siberry)"	4:04
