= The Crow: Wicked Prayer =

2005 film by Lance Mungia

- DVD cover
- Directed by: Lance Mungia
- Screenplay by: Lance Mungia; Jeff Most; Sean Hood
- Based on: The Crow: Wicked Prayer by Norman Partridge; The Crow by James O'Barr
- Produced by: Edward R. Pressman; Jeff Most
- Starring: Edward Furlong; Tara Reid; David Boreanaz; Emmanuelle Chriqui; Dennis Hopper; Marcus Chong; Tito Ortiz; Rena Owen; Danny Trejo; Macy Gray
- Cinematography: Kurt Brabbee
- Edited by: Dean Holland
- Music by: Jamie Christopherson
- Production companies: Pressman Film; Jeff Most Productions; Fubu Films
- Distributed by: Dimension Films
- Release dates: June 3, 2005 (Seattle); July 19, 2005 (United States)
- Running time: 99 minutes
- Country: United States
- Language: English

The Crow: Wicked Prayer is a 2005 American superhero film directed by Lance Mungia, who co-wrote the screenplay with Jeff Most and Sean Hood, based on the 2000 novel of the same name by Norman Partridge, which in turn was based on the comic book character The Crow created by James O'Barr. It is the standalone sequel to The Crow: Salvation (2000) and the fourth installment in The Crow film series. The film stars Edward Furlong, Tara Reid, David Boreanaz, Emmanuelle Chriqui, Dennis Hopper, Marcus Chong, Tito Ortiz, Rena Owen, Danny Trejo, and Macy Gray. The Crow: Wicked Prayer received a one-week theatrical release in Seattle, Washington on June 3, 2005, before being released direct-to-video on July 19, by Dimension Films. It was released to highly negative reviews from critics.

== Plot ==
James "Jimmy" Cuervo, paroled after serving a prison sentence for killing a rapist in a fight, lives with his dog in a mobile home in Lake Ravasu on the Raven Aztec reservation. Jimmy plans to start a new life with his girlfriend, Lily, whom he intends to propose to, and permanently leave the town, but her father, pastor Harold, and brother, local cop Tanner, both despise Jimmy.

The town is home to a Satanic biker gang led by escaped convict Luc "Death" Crash and his fiancée Lola Byrne. Along with their three confederates "Pestilence", "Famine" and "War", Luc and Lola murder the pair in Lily's pawn shop in a brutal ritual that they hope will reawaken the Antichrist, which includes removing Lily's blue eyes — bestowing precognitive powers upon Lola — and Jimmy's heart. They dump the bodies inside an old freezer and burn them.

The Crow then appears and revives Jimmy, who discovers his newfound invincibility after attempting to shoot himself. He takes Lily's body and leaves it on her bed so it can be found. Tanner and Harold find the body and assume Jimmy killed Lily.

On the night of the annual Rave N Fest, Jimmy dons a gothic costume and make-up he wore to the celebration a previous year. Meanwhile, Luc, Lola, War, and Famine interrupt a chapel wedding where they confront Moses, a former criminal turned priest that murdered Luc's father, to kill him, while scouting for virgins to sacrifice. Cuervo tracks down Pestilence to a bar where he electrocutes him with a bug zapper and snaps his neck. He then seizes the hearse carrying Lily's body, and buries her near the tree where he carved a love symbol for them both. Jimmy then arrives at the chapel where he saves Moses from death's door, and they're revealed to be the parents of the rapist Jimmy killed. Afterwards, Jimmy heads to Rave N' Fest at a local casino and kills Famine in front of Luc. During an ensuing fight between Jimmy and Luc, Lola sees the crow and warns Luc of Jimmy's newfound power. Luc hurls an axe at the crow, thereby making Jimmy vulnerable. Tanner finds and accuses Jimmy of killing Lily, but Jimmy shows Tanner telepathically what really happened.

Luc and Lola visit El Niño, the head of their Order, at a place called 'Iniquity', a Catholic church which has been abandoned by Christians and has been modified for use by the Satanic Cult. El Niño agrees to minister the wedding in exchange for a book Lola stole. They even have a hostage, Proud Foot Joe, the hearse driver, as their virgin sacrifice. Tanner and Harold and a group of men assemble outside to confront them. As El Niño is performing the marriage ceremony that will bring Luc closer to harnessing the powers of the Antichrist, Jimmy, Tanner, Harold, and the other men arrive and have a shootout with War, who then attempts a Kamikaze as he lit up the dynamite strapped to himself, only to be shot until he blows up. During the shootout, Joe is accidentally killed, and El Niño completes the ceremony as Jimmy enters the church. Luc, now a host for Lucifer himself, telekinetically hangs Jimmy from a cross, while Lola kills El Niño. Luc and Lola leave the church and head to a nearby graveyard where they must consummate their ritual before sunrise in order for Lucifer to fully manifest, however, Luc's testosterone-driven ego is complicating the ritual as he was supposed to stare into Lola's eyes.

Harold, Tanner, and the others free Jimmy, who tells them the crow is dying. To heal the bird and restore Jimmy's powers, Harold successfully performs the Crow Dance. Weakened, Jimmy heads to the graveyard and stops Luc and Lola's consummation ritual. Luc and Jimmy engage in a fight and the revived crow returns, restoring Jimmy's invulnerability. The sun rises, halting Luc's ritual. Jimmy then kills Luc by impaling him on a wooden spike and cutting his throat. Lola loses her sight and desperately attempts repentance by praying to the Virgin Mary, to no avail; and as Harold prepares to shoot Lola, Tanner stops him and arrests her. Shortly after, Jimmy's spirit is reunited with Lily in the afterlife where he present her a ring.

== Cast ==
- Edward Furlong as James "Jimmy" Cuervo / The Crow, a young man who served in prison for killing a rapist and later murdered, alongside his girlfriend, only to be resurrected to take vengeance. His family name, Cuervo, is the Spanish name for "crow".
- David Boreanaz as Luc 'Death' Crash / Lucifer, an escaped convict who is the leader of a Satanist cabal.
- Tara Reid as Lola Byrne, Luc's girlfriend who is a former prostitute-turned-witch.
- Marcus Chong as 'War', one of Luc's henchmen, a psychopathic gun-crazy miner.
- Tito Ortiz as 'Famine', one of Luc's henchmen, a "half-breed" fry cook known to poison his victims.
- Yuji Okumoto as 'Pestilence', one of Luc's henchmen, a terminally ill hazardous waste cleaner trained in Martial Arts.
- Dennis Hopper as 'El Niño', a Satanic preacher who heads the order of Death at Iniquity.
- Emmanuelle Chriqui as Lilly 'Ignites The Dawn', Jimmy's girlfriend. She and Jimmy are killed by Luc and Lola. After Jimmy's resurrection, his love for Lilly becomes the source of his strength.
- Dave Baez (credited as Dave L. Ortiz) as Sheriff Tanner, Lilly's older brother who is the head tribal officer.
- Danny Trejo as Padre Harold, father of Lilly and Sheriff Tanner. A preacher and devout Christian who is at first skeptical of Jimmy.
- Richard Cumba as Moses, a former convict who did time for killing Luc's father now a priest and the father of the rapist that Cuervo killed
- Rena Owen as Mary, Moses's wife and the mother of the rapist that Cuervo killed
- Daymond John as Proud Foot Joe, the Hearst driver
- Macy Gray as Cara Maria, El Niño's enforcer

== Production ==
In July 2000, rapper DMX had been in discussions with producers about a fourth Crow film titled The Crow: Lazarus about a rapper who chooses to leave the music scene for the love of a woman and is killed during a drive-by shooting. The rapper is then resurrected by the Crow in order to take revenge on the gang responsible for his death. Production had been slated to begin in November of that year, but the project ultimately never came to be. In March 2003, it was announced Edward Furlong had been cast as the lead in The Crow: Wicked Prayer. Lance Mungia was approached by the producers to direct, and accepted as he was a fan of the original. Mungia initially expected the film to be ready within about six months, but the process ended up taking three years Regarding his approach to Wicked Prayer, Mungia said:

I wanted to make a movie more about the process of revenge, the winding, circular course that hatred can take on its path to revenge. That’s why the villains have their own motives, and why Jimmy is not the basic innocent guy, but a convict. Everybody in Wicked Prayer feels like they’ve been wronged somehow, that was very intentional. It sprang from the feelings I had after the Columbine Shootings occurred and 9/11. I didn’t think of this in a high brow way, but I liked referring to the concept that hatred begets hatred and I felt that the previous Crow movies were very clear cut about how they viewed good and evil, and my views were slightly more off center to that.

== Reception ==
On Rotten Tomatoes, the film has an approval rating of 0% based on 9 reviews, with an average rating of 2.1/10.

== Re-release ==
In 2011, The Crow: Wicked Prayer was re-issued by Echo Bridge Home Entertainment as a double feature paired up with The Crow: City of Angels. The only special feature was Widescreen for both films. There was also a single feature release under the same company.

The film has been featured in various horror compilation DVDs from Echo Bridge Home Entertainment.

On September 11, 2012, Echo Bridge Home Entertainment released a Blu-ray release of the film. Once again, it is a double feature with The Crow: City of Angels.

On October 7, 2014, the film was released on DVD by Lionsgate in a triple feature edition with The Crow: City of Angels and The Crow: Salvation.
