= Crow (comics) =

Comic book superhero

The Crow
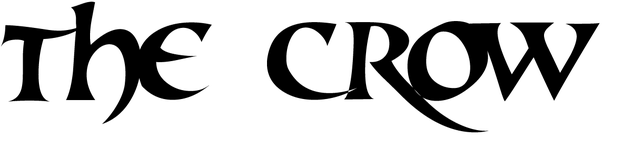

Publication information
- Publisher: Caliber Press (1989–1990); Kitchen Sink Press (1996–1998); Image Comics (1999); IDW Publishing (2012–)
- First appearance: Caliber Presents #1 (January 1989)
- Created by: James O'Barr

In-story information
- Alter ego: Comics: Eric; Joshua Zane; Iris Shaw; Michael Korby; Mark Leung; Leandre; Vincent Leonard; Elorah; Jamie Osterberg; The Man; Carrie / "Curare"; Jack Salvador; Film: Eric Draven; Ashe Corven; Alex Corvis; Jimmy Cuervo; Television: Eric Draven; Hannah Foster; Novels: William Blessing; Jared Poe; Amy Carlisle; Stephen Lelliott; Dan Cody; Billy Parker; Dren
- Abilities: Enhanced strength, speed, and agility; Cat-like reflexes; Heightened senses; Resistance to injury or pain; Psychometry; Tactile empathy & telepathy; Sees through the eyes of the Crow; Able to turn into a crow and possess flight and nightvision

The Crow is a superhero and the protagonist of The Crow comic book series, originally created by American artist James O'Barr in 1989. The titular character is an undead vigilante brought back to life by a supernatural crow to avenge his murder and death of his fiancée.

The character has subsequently appeared in several feature films, a television series, and spin-off novels and comics. In the various incarnations, films, and spin-offs, many people have taken on the Crow persona in order to avenge their own wrongful deaths. In 2011, IGN ranked the Crow 37th in the Top 100 Comic Book Heroes. The Crow made his live-action debut in the 1994 film The Crow, portrayed by Brandon Lee. Later, The Crow was portrayed by Mark Dacascos in the 1998 television series The Crow: Stairway to Heaven.

== The Crow (bird) ==
The Crow is a supernatural bird that serves as the protagonist's link between the living world and the realm of beyond. The magical crow is capable of resurrecting people who have been murdered, so that the victims may be able to seek justice on the person or people responsible for their death. This story is said to come from an old Native American legend.

During the person's "rebirth", the crow serves as a guide, helping the individual tap into his or her potential and assisting in tracking down the wrongdoers. Other people do not see the crow, only the reborn, unless he wants it. The Crow communicates with the reborn in a manner akin to telepathy, often helping guide them to exact their revenge.

In the film adaptations, the crow is a real bird and if harmed or killed, the reborn becomes vulnerable. However, the Crow also seems to be much more enduring than a regular bird and might possess some regeneration abilities (e.g. in The Crow film the bird survives after being shot with a rifle).

== Powers and abilities ==
While they are in possession of the Crow's powers, the reborn are endowed with several unique abilities. As they are already dead, the reborn are incapable of feeling pain or fatigue and are not capable of healing. In the films, however, they possess a supernatural ability to recover from seemingly all injuries in a matter of moments. Chief among their physical abilities is their inhuman strength and enhanced reflexes; able to quickly brutalize several opponents simultaneously, even those who would be otherwise untouchable, as well as catch fast-moving projectiles such as throwing knives with their bare hands. In both Wicked Prayer and Stairway to Heaven, the source of the reborn's strength is attributed to their love for the ones they've lost. Alternatively, Ashe Corven says in City of Angels that the fuel for his power is pain. In either case, the Crow's magic is rooted in lost love.

Also, again in the films, the reborn possesses the ability to see images from his or her loved one's memory when touching things he or she touched before, or to see the memories of a person when touching them. In addition the reborn usually can send the images and feelings from the memories already absorbed to the person whose eyes the reborn touches at the moment; in The Crow, protagonist Eric Draven makes villain Top Dollar feel 30 hours of his (Eric's) murdered girlfriend Shelly's pain in one moment. In The Crow: Stairway to Heaven, Eric can see events that transpired simply by touching objects that belonged to someone.

Although the person brought back to life by the Crow is physically invulnerable, in the films and later Crow comics they do have one weakness: they lose their power if the crow is harmed or killed. In addition, the reborn lose their invincibility when they consider their mission completed; in The Crow: Salvation, protagonist Alex Corvis is tricked into thinking that he completed his mission, thus he becomes vulnerable. His guide Crow ultimately makes Alex realize his mistake and rise again.

In the comic book The Crow: Waking Nightmares, it is stated that the Crow power is taken from the reborn if they abandon their mission. In case of losing special powers, the reborn become vulnerable, start to rot, and rigor mortis sets in, as if the reborn were still in their graves.

In a TV spot of The Crow: City of Angels and the film The Crow: Salvation, those resurrected by the Crow have the ability to turn into crows themselves and possess the natural abilities of a crow, such as flight and night vision.

== Appearance ==
In the comic book, the origin of Eric's make-up is explained briefly as "painting his face in the colors of joy". This indicates that he copied the Greek comedy masquerade mask in his and Shelly's house. Contrary to the film, in the book Eric does not paint his face with white. The white pale color comes from the fact that Eric is dead and it is just a corpse inhabited by a soul. Joshua and Mark Leung do not wear any distinctive make-up, and Ashe's is provided by Sarah, as in the film. Iris Shaw paints the semblance of a Crow on her face with the tail covering her nose, and the wings covering her eyes. She removes it to face her final killer. Michael Korby's makeup covers his neck and shoulders. The makeup is referred as "the mask of death" and "the trails of Gorgon's blood" in The Crow: Wild Justice comic book. In The Crow: Death and Rebirth, Jamie Osterberg's pale skin color and eye/mouth lines are not created by make-up, however, and his hair has turned completely white. In The Crow: Curare, Carrie's pale skin color is not accomplished by make-up, there is no horizontal line over the mouth, and the vertical lines over the eyes are shorter and thinner.

According to O'Barr, Eric Draven is based on the face of Peter Murphy (of Bauhaus) and the body of Iggy Pop.

In all feature films, except The Crow: Salvation, the protagonist wears make-up that cover their face. In the first film Eric Draven copies the pattern from one of the masquerade that decorated his and Shelly's apartment, which consists of white paint placed over the face with black paint around eyes, black vertical lines over and under eyes, black paint on the lips and a black horizontal line across the mouth and cheeks, resembling a Glasgow smile. In The Crow: City of Angels, Ashe's make-up was provided by Sarah and looks similar. Jimmy's make-up in The Crow: Wicked Prayer is similar as well, though there is no horizontal line over the mouth and the vertical eye lines are shorter and thinner.

In the third film, The Crow: Salvation, Alex Corvis is executed in the electric chair, and his face is burned by the metal helmet which was worn over his head during the execution. He removes the burned skin following his resurrection, scarring his face around the eyes and lips, thus forming a pattern similar to the classical make-up. However, there are two vertical lines over each of his eyes and they cross with the horizontal lines on his mouth.

In The Crow: Stairway to Heaven TV series, Eric's "make-up" appears automatically whenever he "changes" into The Crow. His fingernails become black, while his face becomes white, with vertical lines over the eyes and short horizontal/diagonal lines extending from his lips, like a smile; they disappear when he becomes 'normal'.

Even though not all the reborn wear make-up, they are still usually drawn in a certain style: their lips are usually distinctively black, skin around eyes is black, while the eyes are sometimes burning white. Generally, the style of drawing is reminiscent of the pattern of the classical makeup.

The resurrected souls in the Crow novels do not wear the traditional face paint/markings.

== Fictional character biographies ==
=== Comics ===
==== Eric ====
The protagonist of the original comic book. Eric and his fiancée, Shelly, are on their way back from a romantic get-away, when their vehicle breaks down on a deserted road. A car full of gang members stops, not to help, but to take advantage of the couple's misfortune. They shoot Eric in the head paralysing him while they rape and kill his fiancée in the car, while Eric dies hours later in the hospital. A year later, resurrected by The Crow, Eric exacts vengeance on the men responsible for their deaths.

Following the original series, London Night Studios published the six-issue series The Crow/Razor: Kill the Pain (#1-4, #0 and a Finale issue) in 1998, which saw Eric paired with Everette Hartsoe's character, Razor. In it Eric is again returned to the land of the living, this time to help Razor fight a demonic gang known as Pain. In the end Eric must face the events which led to his death, and the realization that his soul cannot rest as he blames himself for being unable to save Shelly. A follow-up magazine entitled The Crow/Razor: Nocturnal Masque, featuring artwork of both characters with quotes attributed to each, was also published.

Eric was also in a 10-issue series by Image Comics which reimagined the plot, adding influences from the film. Eric and Shelly's lives are cut short when a wrong apartment number leads a gang of drug lords to mistakenly murder them only days before their wedding. Now, Eric haunts the city as the Crow, a shadow administering revenge for not only his loss, but for others as well. A police officer enlists the aid of the Crow to uncover the truth about the jailed suspect of a murdered 9-year-old girl. As the Crow is flushing out information about the murder, he discovers that Shelly's grave has been desecrated and her body has been removed. Another vigilante, a Native American named Walker, who communicates with a wolf, begins killing local murderers.

==== Joshua Zane ====
Joshua appears in the three issue series The Crow: Dead Time, the follow-up to the original graphic novel. Joshua is a Native American farmer of the Crow Nation who adopts the "white man's way" and becomes a farmer. Joshua, along with his wife and child, are murdered by a band of Confederate soldiers. A century later, Joshua is resurrected by the Crow and hunts down the soldiers, who have been reincarnated as a biker gang.

==== Iris Shaw ====
Iris appears in the three issue series The Crow: Flesh and Blood and is the first woman to assume the role. Iris is a Federal Conservation officer who is killed, along with her unborn child, by terrorists. The Crow resurrects her to hunt them down. She seems to be not completely invincible, as, according to the Crow, she must complete her mission before she rots. Thus, she cannot really heal, and uses a stapler to repair her wounds.

==== Michael Korby ====
Michael appears in the three-issue series The Crow: Wild Justice. Michael and his wife are murdered during a car jacking. He is brought back by two crows named Hugo and Manny respectively, and must avenge his and his wife's death before the Gorgon blood running through his veins runs out. The Gorgon god tattoos Michael's body, which gives him the power to regenerate until the blood runs out.

==== Mark Leung ====
Mark appears in the four-issue series The Crow: Waking Nightmares. Mark and his wife are murdered by the Chinese Mafia. Instead of going after their killers, Mark returns to save his twin daughters, whom the mob have sold into slavery.

==== Leandre ====
Leandre appears in The French Crow, Vols. 2 and 3, published in France in 2007, in the two-part story "The Medieval Crow". Leandre and his wife Jeanne are murdered and their son Lestal stolen on the orders of Lord Arthuro, who is seeking an heir. Leandre achieves his vengeance when he kills Arthuro, but accidentally kills Lestal as well. After his son's death, Leandre is abandoned by his spirit crow and must wander the Earth until he learns the true reason for his restless wandering.

==== Vincent ====
He appears in The French Crow, Vol. 4, published in France in 2010, in the story "La Fiancée du Corbeau" ("Bride of the Crow"). Vincent is a young make-up artist in the 1930s who falls in love with Evy, an actress. He tries to rescue Evy from being raped by a gang of stagehands but is murdered by them, and he returns a year later, aided by a Spirit Crow, to seek vengeance.

==== Elorah ====
She appears in The French Crow, Vols. 4 & 5, published in France in 2010, in the two-part story "Le Sang des Innocents" ("Blood of the Innocent"). Elorah is an undercover police officer investigating a narcotics baron; after being murdered and revived by a Spirit Crow, she must now face not only her murderer but his creation: a cyborg that feeds on blood.

==== Jamie Osterberg ====
Appearing in the five issue series The Crow: Death and Rebirth, Jamie Osterberg is a foreign exchange student studying in Tokyo, Japan. His fiancée Haruko and other friends vanish, only to return possessed by someone else. Jamie finds out too much and is killed. Resurrected by the power of The Crow, with a sword that seeks truth, he learns that the "possession" was caused by a process that can insert one person's mind into another person's body and that Haruko was taken because an old rich dying woman wanted a new life in Haruko's body. Jamie hunts down those responsible to free the souls of his friends and be reunited with his one true love, even if it means allying himself with Japanese ghosts and demons and following a path of vengeance through the different Japanese Hells (Diyu).

==== The Man ====
The protagonist of the three issue series The Crow: Skinning the Wolves, which takes place at a Nazi concentration camp. The Man, whose name is never revealed, is an inmate whom the camp's commandant murders after losing to him in a game of chess. The Man is resurrected by The Crow and wreaks a vengeance on all of the troops at the camp. He eventually finds and kills his murderer, avenging himself and the other victims of the camp. He then disappears into the night, intending to take revenge on the nearby town whose inhabitants knew what was happening at the camp and did nothing about it.

==== Carrie / "Curare" ====
In the three issue series The Crow: Curare, Carrie is a young girl who was murdered by a serial killer who preys on children. She is resurrected by a Spirit Crow (which she calls "Birdy"). She is also the only protagonist in the "Crow" canon who does not personally engage in violence; instead, she helps Detective Joe Salk, who investigated her murder, to find her killer and take revenge.

==== Salvador ====
In The Crow: Pestilence, Salvador is a young boxer in Juárez, Mexico who refuses to take a fall, but has no problem taking a drug gang's pay-off. When the gang kills Salvador and his family, he returns years later in search of vengeance and forgiveness. The final showdown not only reveals an unexpected ally and an equally unexpected truth about his family's murder, but also pits him against la Santa Muerte ... Death itself.

==== David Amadio ====
In The Crow: Momento Mori, David is a Catholic altar boy who is killed along with his girlfriend Sarah and dozens of others in a terrorist attack in Rome, Italy. Resurrected as the Crow, he wreaks vengeance on those who committed the atrocity, but wiping out the terrorists does not prove the end of the story, as the mastermind behind the attack and the reasons for it still remain a mystery that he must solve before he can rest in peace.

==== Marcus Grieves ====
In The Crow / Hack/Slash, Marcus was a young gay man in 1980s San Francisco who was murdered along with his lover by a gang of neo-Nazi skinheads in a homophobic attack. He killed all the skinheads, but was reactivated decades later to deal with the Angeles Cero situation.

==== Angeles Cero ====
Also in The Crow / Hack/Slash, Angeles was a graffiti artist who was murdered along with her twin sister by Angeles's abusive ex-lover, a police cadet. Angeles killed the killer, but fell under the influence of her acquaintance Urban DK, an "urban shaman" who imprisoned her crow to allow her to continue killing members of the San Francisco police force and political establishment who helped cover up the murder.

== In other media ==
=== Film ===
==== Eric Draven ====
Eric Draven was portrayed by actor Brandon Lee in the 1994 film The Crow, based on the comic book. The film had the same basic premise, except that the couple were murdered in their loft apartment because they were fighting tenant eviction instead of being murdered on the side of the road for fun. The film supplies Eric and Shelly with the respective last names Draven and Webster; in the graphic novel, they were referred to only by their first names. In the film Eric depends on the Crow's health to be invincible, while the graphic novel depicts Eric as totally invincible and the crow is a spirit guide that mostly only Eric sees. Bill Skarsgård played Eric in the reboot.

==== Ashe Corven ====
Ashe Corven (portrayed by Vincent Perez) appears in The Crow: City of Angels, the sequel to The Crow. He is resurrected by the magical crow to avenge the death of his son Danny, who was killed along with him after accidentally witnessing a gang committing a murder. Like his predecessor, Ashe kills each of the gang members until he meets the crime boss who ordered his death. The crime boss, Judah Earl (portrayed by Richard Brooks), wishes to obtain Ashe's powers for himself. Ashe is assisted by Sarah from the original film (here portrayed by Mia Kirshner). Sarah provides Ashe's facial makeup in honor of Eric. While Ashe is on his way to kill Judah, Judah captures his spirit crow and drinks its blood, gaining Ashe's powers. While the film's ending has Ashe and Danny reunited, the original intended ending leaves Ashe unable to move on to the Afterlife, condemning him to wander the Earth.

==== Alexander Frederick "Alex" Corvis ====
In The Crow: Salvation, the third film in the series, Alexander Frederick "Alex" Corvis (portrayed by Eric Mabius) is falsely-convicted of murdering his girlfriend, Lauren (portrayed by Jodi Lyn O'Keefe), and then executed in the electric chair. Alex is assisted by Lauren's younger sister, Erin (portrayed by Kirsten Dunst), as they uncover the mystery surrounding the murder. Alex is the only reborn whose make-up wasn't provided purposefully, but rather appeared in the form of burn scars on his face.

==== James "Jimmy" Cuervo ====
James Cuervo appears in The Crow: Wicked Prayer, the fourth film in the series, which was loosely based on the fifth book of the Crow series of the same name (Dan Cody was the character's name in the book).

As in the book, James "Jimmy" Cuervo (portrayed by Edward Furlong) and his girlfriend Lily (Leticia Hardin in the novel and portrayed by Emmanuelle Chriqui in the film) are hunted down by a gang of Satanists who want to steal her eyes for use in an outlandish ritual. She and Jimmy are both killed in the process. Jimmy then goes on a journey to avenge his and his girlfriend's death and take down the gang in the process.

==== Thorn Gray ====
Thorn Gray appears in Days of Sodom: A Crow Fan Film, a film not associated with the original Crow films or James O'Barr, but a work of fan fiction. He is portrayed by Cody Faulk, who also created the film. He is a homicide detective for the Baltimore Police Department who was set to testify against some dirty cops, however, he learned his pregnant wife, Caroline, was brutally murdered by the very cops he ratted out which was overseen by the corrupt and sadistic Mayor Minos. After seeing his dead wife, Thorn committed suicide, only to be revived again to hunt down the very cops who were responsible.

=== Television ===
==== Eric Draven ====
Eric was also portrayed by Mark Dacascos in the television series The Crow: Stairway to Heaven in 1998. This version of Eric differed slightly from the other versions in that his mission wasn't about revenge, but about redemption. 22 episodes were produced in which Eric acts as a vigilante helping the needy, before the series was pulled in 1999.

==== Hannah Foster ====
Played by Bobbie Phillips, she appears in The Crow: Stairway to Heaven. Hannah Foster is brought back to life one year after she and her daughter are killed. Like Draven, Hannah has a Spirit Crow and possesses all of the Crow's powers, but unlike Eric, she constantly battles between the need for redemption and her lust for vengeance; also, her methods for dealing with her opposition are far more severe than Draven's.

=== Toys ===
NECA released Cult Classics Icons Series 1 Action Figure Eric Draven (The Crow). Hot Toys released The Crow (Eric Draven) 1/6th scale collectible figure.

== Novels ==
=== William Blessing ===
He appears in The Crow: Quoth the Crow, the first published novel in the series. Blessing is a popular horror writer who is murdered by his jealous protégé Donald Marquette, aided by a goth gang with literary aspirations. His wife is viciously raped in the encounter, and Blessing is brought back to exact vengeance. Blessing's body is continually on the verge of rotting away, but his willpower to complete his mission is the only thing holding him together. It is also implied that Blessing's healing abilities are actually the result of eating his victims.

=== Jared Poe ===
He appears in The Crow: The Lazarus Heart, the second novel in the series. Poe is a controversial S&M photographer who becomes the target of a serial killer in Louisiana who preys on gay men and transgender people. He is wrongfully arrested by members of a homophobic police force and convicted for the murder of his lover (who was actually murdered by the serial killer), and while on death row is murdered by a fellow inmate whose brother was one of the serial killer's victims and who believed that Poe was the killer. Upon his rebirth, he tries to track down the real killer with the help of his lover's transgender sister, while also avenging himself on the corrupt police officers who were responsible for his arrest, conviction and death.

=== Amy Carlisle ===
She appears in The Crow: Clash by Night, the third novel in the series. Amy is a day care owner who is killed in a bombing, along with some of the children she watches, when a militia group calling themselves The Sons of America tries to kill a popular senator who was supposed to have been visiting the center but who pulled out at the last minute. Six months after the bombing, Amy is resurrected by a Spirit Crow, but discovers that her husband Rick has moved on with her best friend, who survived the blast. During her acts of vengeance against the militia group's members, Amy is seen and recognized by Rick, who then attempts to infiltrate the militia group.

=== Stephen Lelliott ===
He appears in The Crow: Temple of Night, the fourth novel in the series. In turn-of-the-century Bangkok, the Klong Toey shantytowns are home to shadowy erotic emporiums where millionaire celebrities act out their darkest sexual fantasies, protected by money, influence, and American diplomacy. Stephen Lellicott is a young American journalist assigned to expose the latest cover-up, but he's about to break the two cardinal rules of journalism: don't fall in love, and don't get killed.

=== Dan Cody ===
He appears in The Crow: Wicked Prayer, the fifth novel in the series and the basis for the film of the same name. He and his girlfriend Leticia Hardin are murdered by John Church and Kyra Damon, who have learned about the power of The Crow, who want immortality and who need Leticia's eyes to achieve it. Dan is resurrected, then goes on a journey to avenge his and his girlfriend's deaths.

=== Billy Parker and Dren ===
They appear in The Crow: Hellbound, the sixth novel published in 2001. In this book, a demon named Dren is looking for salvation; the Devil's fiery underworld has become a foreign place to him and feels he is different from the other souls. After escaping from Hell, Dren must save a single soul in order to pass on to the heavens above. Billy is a young hoodlum working for a big-time mobster, and like Dren he has also changed and wants out of the seedy underworld he calls his home. Neither the mob nor Hell look kindly on deserters; the Devil has sent two rogue demons to stop Dren and the mob has hired a conjurer named Nadja to kill Billy. In the end, the two must call on the powers of the Crow to save them both and to escape their own hells — waging a full-scale war on the mobsters of Earth above and the lord of darkness below.

=== Lionel Boulet ===
Lionel appears in Sarah: The Tears of the Crow, the seventh novel published in 2020. The novel is set in Detroit, 1992. The crime and chaos spreading throughout the city is about to disappear when a series of events disrupts everything. Young Sarah is scarred to the depths of her soul when she confronts her past, and her present is her future.

== In popular culture ==
- Eric Draven (alongside his crow) appears in the Robot Chicken episode "Cannot Be Erased, So Sorry", voiced by Simon Pegg. In a segment that parodies The Wizard of Oz, the Nerd (voiced by Seth Green) spices up his dream by imagining Eric Draven in place of the Scarecrow (along with Optimus Prime replacing the Tin Man and Lion-O replacing the Cowardly Lion). When engaging a flying monkey at the castle of the Wicked Witch of the West, Eric explains the meaning of existence in such a depressing way that the flying monkey hangs himself. Eric then sheds a single tear.
- In the season two episode of the Comedy Central program Workaholics titled "Teenage Mutant Ninja Roommates", Anders is shown to have attended Eric Draven Middle School.
- Professional wrestler Sting used the Crow facepaint for his darker persona in late 1996 suggested by Scott Hall (whose New World Order faction was responsible for the persona change) and used a modified version of it until his retirement in 2024. The original face paint was a near identical replica of Eric Draven's face paint with the exception of a frown being painted on his lips instead of a smile. The modified versions include longer trails on the eyes and mouth, resembling black blood. He also briefly merged the look with that of actor Heath Ledger's interpretation of Joker in The Dark Knight during his battle with Hulk Hogan and Eric Bischoff's villainous group Immortal in TNA before returning to the modified Crow styling.
- In the South Park Season 10 Episode "Hell on Earth 2006", Satan is holding a birthday party on Halloween Night in LA and warns everyone not to show up as the Crow, despite trying to suit up as one himself, only to ditch his outfit.
- The 2024 film version of Eric Draven / The Crow appears in the video game Call of Duty: Modern Warfare III (2023) as a playable character, in promotion of the film.
