= Digital face replacement =

Computer generated imagery effect

Digital face replacement is a computer generated imagery effect used in motion picture post-production. It is commonly used to make an actor's body double or stunt double look as if they are the original actor. Possibly the earliest use of face replacement was in the 1993 movie Jurassic Park.

Digital face replacement has also been used to finish an actor's performance in the event of their death during shooting. Examples include the use of face replacement to double for Brandon Lee after his death during the shooting of The Crow (1994), and the use of face replacement to complete Oliver Reed's performance in Gladiator (2000).

== See also ==
- Deepfake
