= The Crow: City of Angels =

1996 film directed by Tim Pope

- Theatrical release poster
- Directed by: Tim Pope
- Written by: David S. Goyer
- Based on: The Crow by James O'Barr
- Produced by: Jeff Most; Edward R. Pressman
- Starring: Vincent Pérez; Mia Kirshner; Richard Brooks; Iggy Pop; Thuy Trang
- Cinematography: Jean-Yves Escoffier
- Edited by: Michael N. Knue; Anthony Redman
- Music by: Graeme Revell
- Production companies: Dimension Films; Pressman Film; Jeff Most Productions
- Distributed by: Miramax Films
- Release date: August 30, 1996
- Running time: 84 minutes
- Country: United States
- Language: English
- Budget: $13 million
- Box office: $25.3 million

The Crow: City of Angels is a 1996 American superhero film directed by Tim Pope and written by David S. Goyer. It serves as a stand-alone sequel to the 1994 film The Crow in addition to being the second installment in The Crow film series. The film stars Vincent Pérez, Mia Kirshner, Richard Brooks, Iggy Pop, Thuy Trang, and Thomas Jane. The film follows mechanic Ashe Corven (Pérez) who is murdered along with his son by a drug cartel, and is brought back to life by a crow to get his revenge. It received negative critic reviews. It was followed by the 2000 film sequel, The Crow: Salvation.

== Plot ==
In Los Angeles, drug kingpin Judah Earl has mechanic Ashe Corven and his eight-year-old son Danny murdered after they witness a gang of Judah's henchmen murdering a fellow drug dealer, with his gang dumping Ashe and Danny's bodies into the harbor. Sometime after, Judah force OD's one of his dealers for destroying his product without his consent despite the protest that his product was tainted.

The now adult Sarah Mohr works in a tattoo parlor by day and paints surreal images of death and resurrection in her apartment at night. She is haunted by disturbing dreams about Ashe and Danny. After a day's work in the tattoo parlor, Sarah is visited in her apartment by a large crow as she contemplates a ring that was given to her by Eric Draven, the original Crow.

Sarah follows the crow to the harbor at night on All Saints' Day, and witnesses Ashe's resurrection as he franticly escapes from his watery grave before being taken to her apartment. When Sarah tells Ashe he is dead, he panics and runs screaming into the night, ending up at his own home, where he relives the final moments of his life.

Sarah arrives there to find Ashe brooding, and she explains that the Crow resurrected him so that he can exact revenge on the criminals who killed him and Danny. Guided by the crow, Ashe decides to kill Judah's henchmen, one by one. Ashe dons the face paint with some leather attire and first visits Spider-Monkey in a drug warehouse and interrogates him as to who else was involved in the murders before blowing up the warehouse, engulfing Spider Monkey in flames while Ashe walked away unscathed with glass shards depicting a crow is left behind. Another of Judah's lackeys, Nemo, is spending the night at a peeping booth. Ashe appears in the booth and kills him, leaving a doll stuffed in his pants and a paper crow in his mouth.

Judah has employed a blind prophetess named Sybil who is able to ascertain Ashe's link to Sarah and to the crow that is the source of his powers and Judah orders his crew to find her. Curve and Kali interrogate her boss, Noah, about her whereabouts but ended up killing him after he refused to comply. Ashe later returns to the scene of the crime where he recovers Danny's body and buries him.

One of the murderers, Kali, goes to Sarah's apartment to capture Sarah and draw Ashe out. While battling her, Ashe realizes that Kali is the one who killed Danny; enraged, he throws her against a wall that breaks her leg, and then out a window to her death, leaving a crow-shaped blood pattern. Ashe then pursues Judah's right-hand-man, Curve, in a motorcycle chase. Ashe shoots Curve's motorcycle, which blows up and throws Curve onto the road. Ashe then drags the mortally wounded Curve into the nearby river, places a coin in his mouth, and sends him floating downstream, leaving him to die as parishioners cast down flower petals in the shape of a crow.

During the Day of the Dead festival, Judah captures the crow and impales its wings with knives before killing it. He then ingests the crow's blood, stealing Ashe's power. Suddenly mortal, Ashe nearly dies from the shock, but is revived after seeing a vision of Danny telling him to keep fighting. Ashe attempts to rescue Sarah by seeking out Judah in his lair, an abandoned church. Judah overpowers the weakened Ashe in the ensuing fight, tying a rope around him and savagely whipping him, intending to hang him.

Sybil releases Sarah from her bonds, allowing Sarah to escape as she rushes up and stabs Judah in the forehead, causing Judah to drop Ashe. Judah pulls out the knife and starts moving toward Ashe. When Sarah intervenes, Judah stabs her in the stomach. Ashe gets up and impales Judah on a metal pipe, which fails to kill him. Ashe calls upon a murder of crows that devour Judah. Sarah dies from her stab wound, a tableau reminiscent of a painting she completed earlier. Ashe returns to death, knowing that he can rest in peace with Sarah, and his son.

== Cast ==
- Vincent Pérez as Ashe Corven / The Crow, a deceased mechanic resurrected as the Crow to avenge himself and his son
- Mia Kirshner as Sarah Mohr, a tattoo artist who was friends with Eric Draven and his fiancé Shelley, from the first film
- Richard Brooks as Judah Earl, a ruthless drug lord responsible for the death of Ashe Corven and his son
- Iggy Pop as "Curve", Judah's top enforcer
- Thuy Trang as Kali, an assassin working for Judah
- Thomas Jane as "Nemo", a perverted thug known to film some of Judah's crimes
- Vincent Castellanos as "Spider Monkey", a drug crazed junkie working for Judah
- Eric Acosta as Danny Corven, Ashe's 8-year-old son
- Beverley Mitchell as Grace, a young homeless girl on the streets
- Ian Dury as Noah, owner of the tattoo parlor and Sarah's boss
- Tracey Ellis as Sybil, Judah's blind prophetess
- Alan Gelfant as Bassett, a drug dealer Judah punished
- Kerry Rossall as Zeke
- Deftones as Themselves

== Production ==
=== Development ===
During development of The Crow, actor Brandon Lee signed a three-picture deal with producer Edward R. Pressman should the film prove successful. However, on March 31, 1993, Lee was fatally struck by a projectile from a prop gun. Director Alex Proyas was hesitant to resume production but ultimately decided to complete the film in Lee's memory. Come its theatrical release in May 1994, The Crow became a box office success.

A sequel to The Crow first began life as a potential television series which was to be produced by Miramax and Disney Television Studios. Pressman, along with producer Jeff Most and comic creator James O'Barr, were less than enthused about the idea and instead aimed for a theatrical feature film. O'Barr was given the first attempt at writing the sequel. O'Barr developed a close relationship with Lee during the making of The Crow and wanted to move a follow-up film in an entirely different direction. Titled The Crow: The Bride, O'Barr's pitch saw a woman resurrected after being killed on her wedding day. When presented to Miramax, studio executives rejected O'Barr's story, claiming "no one is going to see an action movie with a female lead". Instead, the studio brought in Tim Pope, a prolific music video director, and instilled a May 1996 release window. The studio paired Pope with screenwriter David S. Goyer, known for his "encyclopedic knowledge" of comic books. Goyer had known Lee personally and expressed hesitance to signing on, agreeing only under the condition that the protagonist be played by a woman. His pitch partially took place in Victorian-era England and featured a rebirthed Jack the Ripper as the antagonist. Goyer's treatment was approved by Miramax and then promptly scrapped in favor of a film led by "a guy who looks like Brandon Lee." Nevertheless, Goyer remained attached, instead devising a new story which would bring back Sarah Mohr and center on a father avenging the death of his son. After rejecting New Orleans and Detroit, Goyer and Pope decided on the city of Los Angeles to be the setting of their film.

=== Casting ===
Jon Bon Jovi was offered the lead role of Ashe Corven in January 1995. A meeting between Bon Jovi, O'Barr, and Pressman went well, but the contrast between the singer's music and the film's gothic style held him back from getting the part. Swiss actor Vincent Perez was cast as Corven in May 1995 and production was gearing up to begin that October. Whereas Lee's Eric Draven was influenced by Chris Robinson and Iggy Pop, Perez's portrayal was inspired by Hamlet and Jim Morrison. Mia Kirshner was chosen to play Sarah, previously portrayed by Rochelle Davis. Kirshner likened the character to a modern Ophelia. Richard Brooks was cast as the antagonist Judah Earl, while the supporting cast consisted of rockstar Iggy Pop, and former Mighty Morphin' Power Rangers star Thuy Trang in her final film role prior to her death in 2001. Thomas Jane and Vincent Castellanos also appear.

=== Filming ===
The Crow: City of Angels began filming during October 1995 in Los Angeles, California with Jean-Yves Escoffier serving as director of photography. Production was originally intended to take place in Montreal, but production designer Alex McDowell talked Pope out of it, saying "it would have made a very good location for the first film, but [City of Angels] would look exactly like The Crow if we shot there". Filming wrapped in early December after eight and half weeks.

=== Post-production ===
Editing duties were first handled by Richard Marks and Anthony Redman. Additional photography was expected to only be second unit work outside of a lone scene featuring Richard Brooks. However, Pope would lose complete control of the film shortly thereafter when producers Bob Weinstein and Harvey Weinstein stepped in. According to Pope, the Weinsteins ordered drastic reediting to match the structure of the original film. After Pope returned to the UK, he was contacted by the Weinsteins who had constructed a "director's cut", with which he was not involved, and Pope refused to see it or contribute to any commentary on the home media releases. Pope's experience making The Crow: City of Angels was unpleasant enough that Pope avoided returning to feature films for over two decades.

== Music ==
According to RIAA, the album has been certified Platinum with sales exceeding 1 million copies in the United States.

The score was composed by Graeme Revell, who had previously composed the score for the first movie. For this film, he only had eight days to write and record it. He mentioned, “It was never in very good shape as far as editing went - there were lots of issues,” and added, “It was quite difficult because, despite the financial success of the first film, the producers refused to spend any money on an orchestra for the second one. So I had to reuse it and add Latin guitar.”

== Reception ==
=== Box office ===
The Crow: City of Angels opened at number 1 at the U.S. and Canada box office grossing $9,785,111 during its opening weekend, a record for the Labor Day Weekend. Its weekend accounted for 54.6% of its total gross. It also opened at number 1 in the UK. The final US and Canadian gross was $17.9 million.

=== Critical response ===
On Rotten Tomatoes the film has a 16% approval rating based on 38 reviews, with an average rating of 3.6/10. The site's consensus states: "The Crow: City of Angels is a sloppy pretender that captures neither the mood nor energy of the original."

Joe Leydon of Variety called it "Stunningly awful." Owen Gleiberman of Entertainment Weekly gave it grade "D" and wrote: "Even for teens hooked on the grandiloquence of death-metal masochism, the movie may seem closer to an endless Sunday in church."

In a 2016 list of overlooked movies, while acknowledging the film's failings, Ignatiy Vishnevetsky of The A.V. Club defended it as a guilty pleasure, calling it "a small wonder of trashy, unregulated filmmaking" with particular praise for Jean-Yves Escoffier's cinematography, proclaiming it "some of his most gorgeous work".

== Home media ==
On October 7, 2014, City of Angels was released on DVD by Lionsgate in a triple feature edition with the other two Crow sequels.

== Video game ==
A video game tie-in, The Crow: City of Angels, was made for the PlayStation, Sega Saturn, and Microsoft Windows. It was to be initially released around the same time as the film but instead released in early 1997.
