= Kult (card game) =

Collectible card game

Kult CCG
- Card back of the Kult CCG.
- Designers: Bryan Winter
- Publishers: Target Games/Heartbreaker Hobbies
- Players: 2 or more
- Setup time: < 5 minutes
- Playing time: < 60 minutes

Kult is an out-of-print collectible card game by Target Games and Heartbreaker Hobbies. It is based on a role-playing game of the same name. It was released in 1995 and has a single expansion in 1997.

== Gameplay ==
Each player selects one of the Major Arcana, each representing the Archons and Angels of Death. Each Archon card lists a special ability and has four symbols representing available resources. The player's play area consists of several parts: the Cast, with four cards on the right side; the Hub in the center, with the Major Arcanum; and the Stage, four cards arranged one on each side of the Hub and forming a cross with it.

The goal is to control the majority of world's population by moving Population Markers from the center of the shared play area successively to the player's Cast, Stage, and Hub. This is done by playing character cards, as each can occupy one space and provide routes for Population Markers. Played Characters can engage in combat, in which the combatant cards of opponents are compared and that with a lower combat value is discarded.

== Publication history ==
Kult card game was released in November 1995. The game had one expansion released in July 1997, called Inferno. It added 127 cards to the base set's 262. According to The Duelist magazine, the expansion was announced as having 121 cards and 2 chase cards.

The game received a Polish edition in 1997.

== Reception ==
Lucya Szachnowski reviewed Kult for Arcane magazine, rating it a 4 out of 10 overall. Szachnowski comments that "if you like gruesome, macabre artwork you'll love the Kult CCG. Kult has a modern day horror background based on films like Hellraiser and Jacob's Ladder, and real-life occult belief systems such as the Qaballah".

Pyramid magazine reviewed Kult and stated that "The Kult game world has gathered much critical acclaim and a fanatic core of players for its stomach-churning mix of kabbalism, gnosticism, old world occult and hard-core horror. The RPG is absolutely not for kids, or even some adults. Neither is its new card game."

There was some controversy over the release of the game due to its graphic art, but Allen Varney noted that despite its "disturbing art" the game "isn't scary and has only tangential relation to Metropolis Ltd.s' Kult horror roleplaying game". Varney also remarked the game was "excellent" and "easy to learn and plays great from the start".

== Reviews ==
- Magia i Miecz (issue #45 - Sep 1997) (Polish)
- Świat Gier Komputerowych #55 (Polish)
