= Lance Mungia =

American film director

- Born: 1972 (age 52–53); United States
- Occupation(s): Film director, screenwriter

Lance Mungia (born 1972) is an American screenwriter and film director of the film Six String Samurai and co-writer/director of The Crow: Wicked Prayer for Dimension Films.

Mungia grew up in Central California, where his family operated a rose-growing business. He is of Mexican and European heritage. Mungia studied film at Loyola Marymount University, where he wrote and directed the short film Garden for Rio in 1996. The film screened at Sundance, where he secured funding to complete Six String Samurai.

Mungia went on to direct music videos and the fourth installment in The Crow film series in 2005. In 2013, he directed the film In Time about the band The Delgado Brothers. From 2009 to 2017, Mungia worked as executive director, initially in an interim capacity and later full-time, of KGEM public access television station. Mungia co-founded the production company Waking Universe Films with his partner, Cristina Mercado. In 2018 the company produced the documentary Third Eye Spies about the work of Russell Targ, which Mungia also directed. In 2022, Mungia directed an episode of the animated mini-series Belonging. He has one child.
