= Edward R. Pressman =

American film producer (1943–2023)

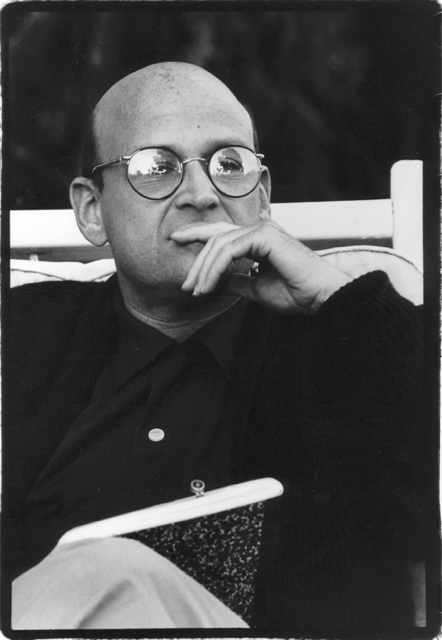
- Born: Edward Rambach Pressman; April 11, 1943; New York City, U.S.
- Died: January 17, 2023 (aged 79); Los Angeles, California, U.S.
- Occupation: Film producer
- Spouse: Annie McEnroe (m. 1983)
- Children: 1

Edward Rambach Pressman (April 11, 1943 – January 17, 2023) was an American film producer and founder of the production company Edward R. Pressman Film Corporation.

== Early life ==
Pressman was born to a Jewish family in New York City, the son of Lynn and Jack Pressman, known as the "King of Marbles", who founded the Pressman Toy Corporation.

== Career ==
In 1987, his own production company Edward R. Pressman Film Corporation had received a three-feature pact with International Video Entertainment to handle theatrical and home video distribution rights with a dual option to extend into a fourth feature.

The Academy Film Archive houses the Edward R. Pressman Collection. The film collection contains over 250 items, including theatrical prints, printing elements and videotapes related to the films produced by Pressman or his production company, as well as films acquired by Pressman Films for reference purposes. The Pressman Collection is complemented by paper materials held at the Academy's Margaret Herrick Library.

== Personal life ==
In 1983, Pressman married actress Annie McEnroe, whom he met on the set of the 1981 film The Hand. He has one child.

=== Death ===
Pressman died in Los Angeles on January 17, 2023, at the age of 79. His death was confirmed by his production company.

== Filmography ==
As an actor

Year	Film	Role
1985	Crimewave	Ernest Trend
1994	Street Fighter	Lonely Cook

Music department

Year	Film	Role
1996	The Crow: City of Angels	Executive soundtrack producer

Miscellaneous crew

Year	Film	Role
1980	Christmas Evil	Presenter

Thanks

Year	Film	Role
2020	American Terrorist	The producers wish to thank

Producer

- Out of It (1969)
- The Revolutionary (1970)
- Dealing: Or the Berkeley-to-Boston Forty-Brick Lost-Bag Blues (1972)
- Sisters (1972)
- Badlands (1973)
- Phantom of the Paradise (1974)
- Old Boyfriends (1979) *
- Heart Beat (1980)
- The Hand (1981)
- Plenty (1985)
- Wall Street (1987)
- Cherry 2000 (1988)
- Talk Radio (1988)
- Blue Steel (1990)
- Reversal of Fortune (1990)
- Stranger in the House (1990) (co-producer)
- Homicide (1991)
- Year of the Gun (1991)
- Bad Lieutenant (1992)
- Storyville (1992)
- Hoffa (1992)
- The Crow (1994)
- Street Fighter (1994)
- City Hall (1996)
- The Island of Dr. Moreau (1996)
- The Crow: City of Angels (1996)
- The Blackout (1997)
- The Winter Guest (1997)
- Two Girls and a Guy (1997)
- New Rose Hotel (1998)
- Legionnaire (1998)
- Endurance (1998)
- After the Truth (1999) (co-producer)
- American Psycho (2000)
- The Crow: Salvation (2000)
- The Beautiful Country (2004)
- Undertow (2004)
- The Crow: Wicked Prayer (2005)
- Amazing Grace (2006)
- Sisters (2006)
- Mutant Chronicles (2008)
- Bad Lieutenant: Port of Call New Orleans (2009)
- Wall Street: Money Never Sleeps (2010)
- The Man Who Knew Infinity (2015)
- Dalíland (2022)
- Catching Dust (2023)
- The Crow (2024)

Executive producer

- Badlands (1973)
- Paradise Alley (1978)
- Victoria (1979)
- Das Boot (1981) (Director's cut)
- Conan the Barbarian (1982)
- The Pirates of Penzance (1983)
- Flicks (1982)
- Conan the Destroyer (1984) (Uncredited)
- Crimewave (1985)
- Half Moon Street (1986)
- True Stories (1986)
- Good Morning, Babylon (1987)
- Masters of the Universe (1987)
- Walker (1987)
- Paris by Night (1988)
- Martians Go Home (1989)
- To Sleep with Anger (1990)
- Waiting for the Light (1990)
- Iron Maze (1991)
- Dream Lover (1993)
- Judge Dredd (1995)
- The Crow: Stairway to Heaven (1998-1999)
- Black and White (1999)
- Happy Times (2000)
- Wendigo (2001)
- Harvard Man (2001)
- The Guys (2002)
- The Cooler (2003)
- Party Monster (2003)
- The Hebrew Hammer (2003)
- Owning Mahowny (2003)
- Love Object (2003)
- Rick (2003)
- Never Die Alone (2004)
- The King (2005)
- Thank You for Smoking (2005)
- Driving Lessons (2006)
- Fur (2006)
- The Moth Diaries (2011)
- Red Wing (2013)
- Paterno (2018) (TV movie)
- She Will (2021)
- Evolver (2022)
