= Jeff Most =

American film producer

Jeff Most (born September 15, 1960) is an American film producer, best known as the producer and music supervisor of The Crow film series.

Most was co-producer on The Crow with Edward R. Pressman in 1993, and also produced the film's soundtrack album. He produced the films and soundtracks for the subsequent entries in the franchise: The Crow: City of Angels (1996), The Crow: Salvation (2000) and The Crow: Wicked Prayer (2005).

Jeff Most has also produced films such as The Specialist, Girl, Venice Underground, The Tomb and On The Doll. In early 2007, he produced a film called Kingshighway, reuniting him with The Crow: Wicked Prayer star Edward Furlong. The film starred and was directed by Clayne Crawford.
