= The Crow (1994 film) =

American film by Alex Proyas

- Theatrical release poster
- Directed by: Alex Proyas
- Screenplay by: David J. Schow; John Shirley
- Based on: The Crow by James O'Barr
- Produced by: Edward R. Pressman; Jeff Most
- Starring: Brandon Lee; Ernie Hudson; Michael Wincott
- Cinematography: Dariusz Wolski
- Edited by: Dov Hoenig; Scott Smith
- Music by: Graeme Revell
- Production companies: Entertainment Media Investment Corporation; Pressman Film; Jeff Most Productions
- Distributed by: Dimension Films; Miramax Films (United States); Summit Entertainment (Overseas)
- Release date: May 13, 1994 (United States)
- Running time: 102 minutes
- Country: United States
- Language: English
- Budget: $23 million
- Box office: $94 million

The Crow is a 1994 American gothic supernatural superhero film directed by Alex Proyas, written by David J. Schow and John Shirley, and based on the 1989 comic book series by James O'Barr. It stars Brandon Lee in his final film role, as Eric Draven, a rock musician who is resurrected from the dead to seek vengeance against the gang who murdered him and his fiancée.

Lee was fatally wounded by a prop gun during filming. As he had finished most of his scenes, the film was completed through script rewrites, a stunt double, and digital effects. After Lee's death, Paramount Pictures opted out of distribution and the rights were acquired by Miramax Films. The film is dedicated to Lee and his fiancée, Eliza Hutton.

The Crow premiered in Santa Monica on May 10, 1994, and was released in the United States on May 13, 1994, by Dimension Films. The film received positive reviews for its stylized noir aesthetic, emotional resonance and Lee's performance. It grossed $94 million on a $23 million budget and has gained a cult following. The success led to three sequels, a television series, and a 2024 reboot, all of which failed to replicate the first movie's success.

== Plot ==
On Devil's Night, in crime-ravaged, decrepit Detroit, a young woman, Shelly Webster, is raped and mortally wounded, while her rock musician fiancé, Eric Draven, is shot and thrown to his death from the window of their loft apartment. Police Sergeant Daryl Albrecht accompanies Shelly to the hospital, where she eventually dies from her injuries. Sarah, a young girl the couple cared for due to her neglectful mother, narrates the legend of a crow that carries souls to the land of the dead; if a person dies under tragic circumstances, the crow can resurrect their restless spirit to set things right.

One year later, Sarah visits Shelly and Eric's graves. A crow lands on Eric's gravestone and taps on it, resurrecting him. Disoriented and distressed, Eric returns to their ruined loft and experiences flashbacks of the murders: a gang of men — Tin Tin, Funboy, T-Bird, and Skank — attacked the couple because they were protesting forced evictions in their apartment building, which the gang’s leader, ruthless crime boss Top Dollar, intended to seize. Realizing that any injury he suffers heals instantly, Eric dons black-and-white face paint and sets out to avenge himself and Shelly, guided by the crow.

The crow leads Eric to Tin Tin, whom he stabs to death. He next visits the pawn shop where Tin Tin had pawned Shelly's engagement ring. Eric recovers the ring and blows up the shop but spares the owner, Gideon, so he can alert Top Dollar's men that Eric is coming for them, only for Top Dollar to kill Gideon. Albrecht begins investigating the apparent vigilante disturbances, while Eric finds Funboy taking drugs with Sarah's estranged, addicted mother, Darla. He gives Funboy a fatal overdose and purges the drugs from Darla's body, chiding her that Sarah needs her.

Eric visits Albrecht and confirms his suspicions about the vigilante's identity. Albrecht tells Eric that he stayed with Shelly until she died, witnessing the thirty hours of suffering she endured. Eric touches Albrecht, absorbing the pain Shelly felt. Later, Eric saves Sarah from being hit by a car, revealing to her that he has returned. Eric next targets T-Bird, killing him in an explosion.

The next morning, Sarah and Darla reconcile, and Sarah reunites with Eric at his apartment. Top Dollar holds a meeting with his associates to discuss plans to burn the city to the ground on Devil's Night. Eric arrives for Skank, but a gunfight erupts, ending with Eric throwing Skank from a window to his death. Top Dollar, his lover and half-sister Myca, and his right-hand man Grange escape. Myca deduces that the crow is the source of Eric's immortality.

Satisfied with his vengeance, Eric gives Shelly's engagement ring to Sarah and returns to his grave. Grange abducts Sarah on her way home and takes her to an abandoned church, where Myca and Top Dollar await. Top Dollar takes Shelly's ring. The crow alerts Eric to Sarah's plight, and he rushes to rescue her but is ambushed by Grange, who wounds the crow and renders Eric vulnerable. Albrecht arrives and kills Grange, while Myca attempts to seize the crow for its power; it claws out her eyes, causing her to fall to her death from the bell tower. Top Dollar retreats to the church roof with Sarah, where he fights and badly wounds Eric and reveals that he ordered T-Bird and his men to clear their apartment, making him responsible for Eric and Shelly's murders. Eric transfers Shelly's pain into Top Dollar, causing him to stumble off the roof and be fatally impaled on a gargoyle.

Sarah and a wounded Albrecht are recovered from the church, while a dying Eric goes to Shelly's grave, where her spirit arrives to comfort him and return his body to rest. Some time later, Sarah visits the graves, and the crow gives her Shelly's ring.

== Cast ==
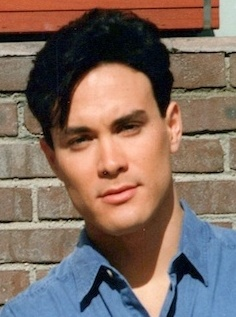
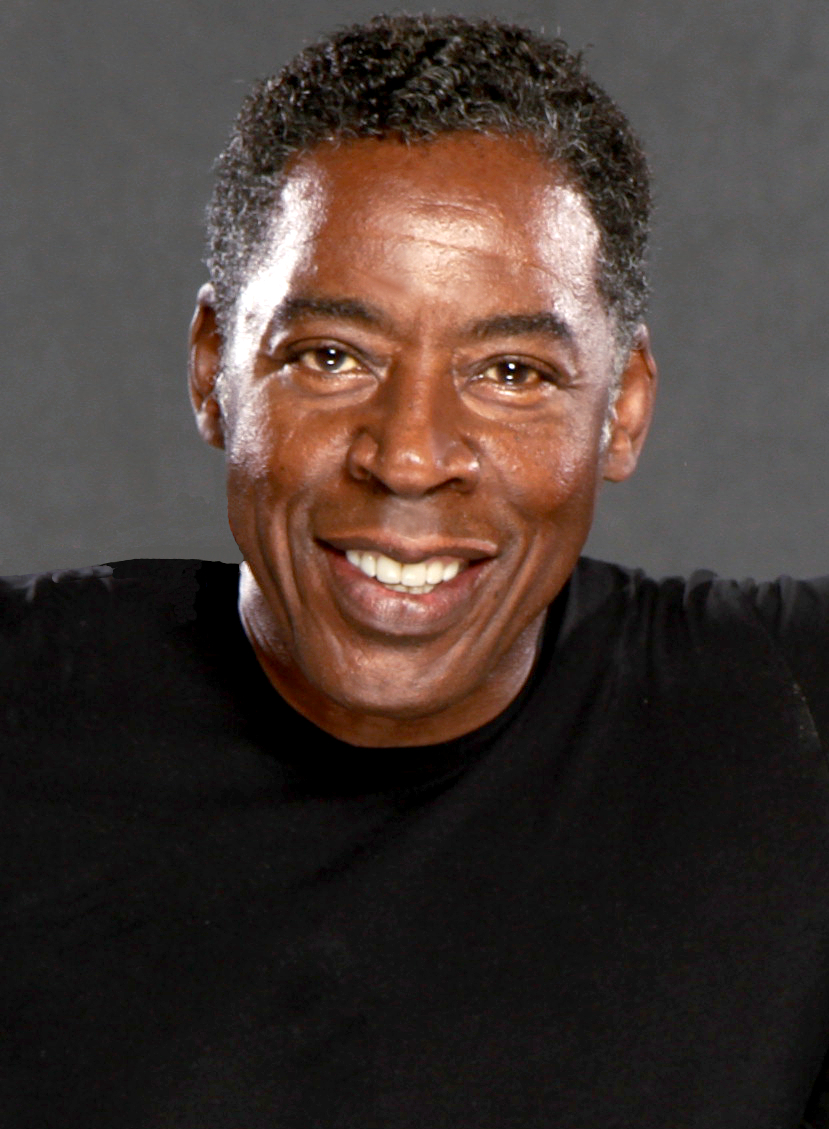
Brandon Lee (pictured circa 1991) and Ernie Hudson (2014)
- Brandon Lee as Eric Draven / The Crow, a rock musician who was murdered on Devil's Night and returned a year later after being resurrected by the mysterious crow, now seeks revenge against the four murderers to avenge his murder and his fiancée's death as an undead vigilante, the "Crow".
- Ernie Hudson as Sergeant Albrecht, a hardened Detroit PD Veteran who was close to Eric and Shelly
- Michael Wincott as "Top Dollar", the ruthless crime lord who is behind Eric and Shelly's murder
- David Patrick Kelly as "T-Bird", the gang lieutenant who leads the attack on Eric and Shelly
- Angel David as "Skank", the hyped-up member in T-Bird's crew
- Rochelle Davis as Sarah Mohr, a young girl who was close to Eric and Shelly and the Narrator
- Bai Ling as Myca, Top Dollar's half-sister and lover
- Laurence Mason as "Tin-Tin", a knife-wielding thug and thief in T-Bird's crew
- Michael Massee as "Funboy", the junkie in T-Bird's crew
- Bill Raymond as Mickey, the owner of the hot dog stand, Maxi Dogs, that Albrecht and Sarah frequent
- Norman 'Max' Maxwell as Roscoe, the lead bartender at The Pit
- Marco Rodríguez as Detective Torres, a Detroit Homicide detective and Albrecht's CO
- Sofia Shinas as Shelly Webster, Eric's late fiancée
- Anna Levine as Darla Mohr, Sarah's drug-addled mother
- Tony Todd as "Grange", Top Dollar's enforcer
- Jon Polito as Gideon, a corrupt pawn broker known to buy stolen items from Tin-Tin
- Kim Sykes as Annabelle, a Detroit PD officer acquainted with Albrecht

Michael Berryman filmed scenes as the Skull Cowboy, Eric's spirit guide, but his scenes were cut from the finished film. Chad Stahelski was Brandon Lee's body double in several scenes filmed after Lee's death.

== Production ==
=== Development ===
James O'Barr wrote what would become The Crow as a means to cope with the unexpected death of his fiancée, who was killed by a drunk driver. The first meeting O'Barr had with a major studio was quickly dismissed after the studio's vision for the film was a musical with Michael Jackson as the lead. Around the time of The Crow's publication, writer John Shirley had pitched Angry Angel to Caliber Press, who turned it down due to similarities with The Crow. Shirley sought the comic out and decided to adapt it into a film. O'Barr was receptive and agreed to workshop the film with Shirley and producer Jeff Most, turning down a significant offer from New Line Cinema in the process. O'Barr oversaw three different script treatments by Shirley and Most before directly collaborating on the first two drafts of the screenplay. Shirley penned the third and fourth draft by himself which awarded him screenplay credit by the Writers Guild of America. Most claimed to have written a "substantial proportion" of the script, but was denied credit due to a rule in the WGA which prohibited producers from receiving credit. The addition of producer Edward Pressman gave The Crow further momentum, but Shirley would be fired during development after clashing with a development head at Pressman's studio. Splatterpunk writer David J. Schow was brought in for rewrites. From a suggestion by Most, Pressman primarily pursued music video and commercial directors to helm the film; Julien Temple being Most's top choice. Australian filmmaker Alex Proyas was hired to direct the film. Paramount Pictures picked up the distribution rights and slotted an August 1993 release date.

Christian Slater and River Phoenix were early considerations for the role of Eric Draven. Shirley and Most pushed for Slater while Pressman wanted River Phoenix. Brandon Lee was suggested to play Draven, but O'Barr was unconvinced fearing he would not be suited for the material. However, Lee won O'Barr over and was given the role shortly thereafter. Lee dropped 20 pounds to portray Draven and worked closely with the crew to shape the film, co-choreographing his action sequences with Jeff Imada, performing most of his stunts, and removing a subplot due to its East Asian stereotyping. Rochelle Davis, Ernie Hudson, Michael Wincott, Bai Ling, Sofia Shinas, Michael Massee, David Patrick Kelly, Tony Todd, and Jon Polito rounded out the supporting cast.

=== Filming ===
Production began on The Crow in February 1993 in Wilmington, North Carolina and was scheduled to last 54 days.

=== Brandon Lee's death ===
On March 31, 1993, at EUE Screen Gems Studios in Wilmington, North Carolina, Lee was filming a scene where his character, Eric, is shot after witnessing the beating and rape of his fiancée. Actor Michael Massee's character Funboy fires a .44 Magnum Smith & Wesson Model 629 revolver at Lee as he walks into the room. A scene filmed two weeks before Lee's had called for the same gun to be shown in close-up. Revolvers often use dummy cartridges fitted with bullets, but no powder or primer, during close-ups as they look more realistic than blank rounds which have no bullet. Instead of purchasing commercial dummy cartridges, the film's prop crew, hampered by time and money constraints, created their own by pulling the bullets from live rounds, dumping the powder charge but not the primer, then reinserting the bullets. Witnesses reported that two weeks before Lee's death they saw an unsupervised actor pulling the trigger on the gun while it was loaded with the powderless but primed round. Since the primer was still live, it could launch the bullet with enough force to push it out of the case and wedge it in the barrel.

In the fatal scene, which called for the revolver to be actually fired at Lee from a distance of 12–15 feet, the dummy cartridges were exchanged for blank rounds, which feature a live powder charge and primer, but no bullet, thus allowing the gun to be fired without the risk of an actual projectile. As the production company had sent the firearms specialist home early, responsibility for the guns was given to a prop assistant who was unaware of the rule for inspecting all firearms before and after any handling. Therefore, the barrel was not checked for obstructions when the time came to load it with the blank rounds. Since the bullet from the dummy round was already trapped in the barrel (a condition known as a squib load), this caused the .44 Magnum bullet to be fired out of the barrel with virtually the same force as if the gun had been loaded with a live round, and it struck Lee in the abdomen, mortally wounding him.

After Lee's death, the producers were faced with the decision of whether or not to continue with the film. Lee had completed most of his scenes for the film and was scheduled to shoot for only three more days. The rest of the cast and crew, except for Ernie Hudson, whose brother-in-law had just died, stayed in Wilmington. Paramount Pictures, which was initially interested in distributing The Crow theatrically (originally a direct-to-video feature), opted out of involvement due to delays in filming and some controversy over the violent content being inappropriate given Lee's death. However, Miramax Films picked it up with the intention of releasing it in theatres and injected a further $8 million to complete the production, taking its budget to approximately $23 million. The cast and crew then took a break for script rewrites of the flashback scenes that had yet to be completed. The script was rewritten by Walon Green, Terry Hayes, René Balcer, and Michael S. Chernuchin, adding narration and new scenes. Lee's stunt double Chad Stahelski was used as a stand-in and digital face replacement was used to superimpose Lee's face onto the head of the double. The beginning of the movie, which had not been finished, was rewritten, and the apartment scene remade using computer graphics from an earlier scene of Lee.

A character from the original comic book called Skull Cowboy was originally planned to be part of the adaptation and even had scenes filmed. He acted as a guide for Eric Draven between the worlds of the dead and the living. He was set to be played by Michael Berryman, but the role was cut from the film due to Lee's death.

O'Barr later remarked that losing Lee was like losing his fiancée all over again, and he regretted ever writing the comic in the first place.

== Reception ==
=== Box office ===
The film opened at number one in the United States in 1,573 theaters with $11,774,332 and averaging $7,485 per theater, making it Miramax's biggest ever opening. Some industry sources believed that Miramax overstated the weekend gross by as much as $1 million. The film ultimately grossed $50,693,129 in the United States and Canada, and $43 million internationally, for a worldwide total of $93.7 million against its budget of $23 million. It ranked at number 24 for all films released in the US in 1994, the 24th highest-grossing film worldwide for 1994 and number 10 for R-rated films released that year.

In Europe, the film grossed £1,245,403 in the United Kingdom (where it was 18-rated), and sold 4,604,115 tickets in France, Germany, Italy and Spain. In Seoul, South Korea, it sold 83,126 tickets.

=== Critical response ===
The Crow has an approval rating of 87% on Rotten Tomatoes based on 75 reviews and an average rating of 7.2/10. The critical consensus states: "Filled with style and dark, lurid energy, The Crow is an action-packed visual feast that also has a soul in the performance of the late Brandon Lee." The film also has a score of 71 out of 100 on Metacritic based on 14 critics, indicating "generally favorable reviews".

Reviewers praised the action and visual style. Rolling Stone called it a "dazzling fever dream of a movie"; Caryn James, writing for The New York Times, called it "a genre film of a high order, stylish and smooth"; and Roger Ebert called it "a stunning work of visual style". The Los Angeles Times praised the film also.

Lee's death was alleged to have a melancholic effect on viewers; Desson Howe of The Washington Post wrote that Lee "haunts every frame" and James Berardinelli called the film "a case of 'art imitating death', and that specter will always hang over The Crow". Both Berardinelli and Howe called it an appropriate epitaph to Lee, and Ebert stated that not only was this Lee's best film, but it was better than any of his father's. Critics generally thought that this would have been a breakthrough film for Lee, although Berardinelli disagreed. The changes made to the film after Lee's death were noted by reviewers, most of whom saw them as an improvement. Howe said that it had been transformed into something compelling. Berardinelli, although terming it a genre film, said that it had become more mainstream because of the changes.

James Lowder reviewed The Crow in White Wolf Inphobia #57 (July, 1995), rating it a 4 out of 5 and stated that "Of course the incredible pall of melancholy that hangs over The Crow owes something to Brandon Lee's death during the film's production. Beyond the death's utter senselessness, it should make us wonder at the human price we're willing to pay for entertainment."

The film was widely compared to other films, particularly Tim Burton's Batman movies and Ridley Scott's Blade Runner. Critics described The Crow as a darker film than the others; Ebert called it a grungier and more forbidding story than those of Batman and Blade Runner, and Todd McCarthy of Variety wrote that "it's set in a generic inner city so hellish it makes Gotham City look like the Emerald City".

The cinematography by Dariusz Wolski and the production design by Alex McDowell were also praised. The cityscape designed by McDowell and the production team was described by McCarthy as rendered imaginatively. The film's comic book origins were noted, and Ebert called it the best version of a comic book universe he had seen. McCarthy agreed, calling it "one of the most effective live-actioners ever derived from a comic strip". Critics felt that the soundtrack complemented this visual style, calling it blistering, edgy and boisterous. Graeme Revell was praised for his "moody" score; Howe said that it "drapes the story in a postmodern pall."

The Crow is mentioned in Empire's 2008 list of the 500 greatest movies of all time; it ranked at number 468. It has since become a cult film.

== Accolades ==
- 7th – Sandi Davis, The Oklahoman
- Top 10 (listed alphabetically, not ranked) – Matt Zoller Seitz, Dallas Observer
- Top 10 (listed alphabetically, not ranked) – Mike Mayo, The Roanoke Times
- Top 10 (not ranked) – Betsy Pickle, Knoxville News-Sentinel
- Top 12 worst (Alphabetically ordered, not ranked) – David Elliott, The San Diego Union-Tribune
- Top 3 "Best in-your-face exploitation" (not ranked) – Glenn Lovell, San Jose Mercury News

Award	Category	Recipient	Result
MTV Movie Award	Best Movie of the Year		Nominated
MTV Movie Award	Best Actor	Brandon Lee (posthumous)	Nominated
MTV Movie Award	Best Song	Stone Temple Pilots; For the song "Big Empty"	Won
Saturn Awards	Best Horror Film		Nominated
Saturn Awards	Best Director	Alex Proyas	Nominated
Saturn Awards	Best Costume Design	Arianne Phillips	Nominated
Saturn Awards	Best Special Effects	Andrew Mason (International Creative Effects)	Nominated

== Soundtracks ==
The original soundtrack album for The Crow features songs from the film, and was a chart-topping album. It included work by The Cure (their song, "Burn", became the film's main theme), Stone Temple Pilots, The Jesus and Mary Chain, Rage Against the Machine and Helmet, among many others. In Peter Hook's memoir Substance: Inside New Order, Hook relates that New Order were approached to provide the soundtrack for the film, with a cover of "Love Will Tear Us Apart", their hit as Joy Division, citing parallels between Eric's resurrection and New Order's formation after the suicide of Joy Division frontman Ian Curtis. However, New Order frontman Bernard Sumner declined, stating that they were too busy with their album Republic to commit to another project. James O'Barr, creator of the original comic book series, was a big fan of Joy Division and had named the characters Sergeant Albrecht and Captain Hook after bandmates Sumner (who was also known as Bernard Albrecht early in his career) and Hook.

Several groups contributed covers. Nine Inch Nails rendered Joy Division's "Dead Souls", Rollins Band covered Suicide's "Ghost Rider" and Pantera performed Poison Idea's "The Badge".

The bands Medicine and My Life with the Thrill Kill Kult make cameo appearances in the film on stage in the nightclub below Top Dollar's headquarters.

The score consists of original, mostly orchestral music, with some electronic and guitar elements, written for the film by Graeme Revell.

== Home media ==
The Crow was first released on VHS and LaserDisc on September 14, 1994, by Miramax Home Entertainment. It found success in the home video market, and ended up as the 8th best-selling video in the United States for 1995. A widescreen DVD was released on February 3, 1998, followed by a two-disc DVD on March 20, 2001, as part of the Miramax/Dimension Collector's Series. On October 18, 2011, The Crow was released on Blu-ray through Lionsgate Pictures who also re-released the DVD format on August 17, 2012. In Japan, the movie was remastered in 4K for a special edition in 2016, although the film's final resolution was capped at 1080p. In April 2020, ViacomCBS (now known as Paramount Skydance) bought a 49% stake in Miramax from beIN Media Group, which gave them the rights to Miramax's 700 film library, and since April 2020, Paramount Pictures has regained distribution rights to The Crow. The film was subsequently reissued on Blu-ray and DVD by Paramount Home Entertainment on September 22, 2020, with this being one of many Miramax films reissued on DVD/Blu-ray by Paramount around this time. A 4K UHD Blu-ray edition of the film would follow on May 7, 2024 for the film's 30th anniversary featuring a clean film transfer, Dolby Vision, and new special features like a 25-minute production design documentary.

== Franchise ==
=== Sequels ===
In 1996, a sequel was released, called The Crow: City of Angels. In this film, Vincent Pérez plays Ashe Corven, who, along with his son Danny, is killed by criminals. Ashe is resurrected as a new Crow. The character of Sarah (now played by Mia Kirshner) reappears in this film and assists Ashe. The film also features Iggy Pop, who, according to the booklet insert for the film's soundtrack, was the producer's first choice for Funboy in the first Crow movie, but he was unable to commit due to his recording schedule. In addition, it also featured the final appearance of Thuy Trang. The band Deftones can be seen playing live in a festival scene and they contributed the song "Teething" to the soundtrack. The film received mostly negative reviews.

The third film, The Crow: Salvation, was released in 2000. Directed by Bharat Nalluri, it stars Eric Mabius, Kirsten Dunst, Fred Ward, Jodi Lyn O'Keefe and William Atherton. It is loosely based on Poppy Z. Brite's novel The Lazarus Heart. After its distributor cancelled the intended theatrical release due to The Crow: City of Angels' negative critical reception, The Crow: Salvation was released directly to video with mixed reviews.

The fourth film, The Crow: Wicked Prayer, was released in 2005. Directed by Lance Mungia, it stars Edward Furlong, David Boreanaz, Tara Reid, Tito Ortiz, Dennis Hopper, Emmanuelle Chriqui and Danny Trejo. It was inspired by Norman Partridge's novel of the same title. It had a one-week theatrical première on June 3, 2005, at AMC Pacific Place Theatre in Seattle, Washington, before being released to video on July 19, 2005. Like the other sequels, it had a poor critical reception.

=== Canceled sequel ===
The Crow: 2037 was a planned sequel written and scheduled to be directed by Rob Zombie in the late 1990s; however, it was never made.

=== Television series ===
The Crow: Stairway to Heaven was a 1998 Canadian television series created by Bryce Zabel and starring Mark Dacascos in the lead role as Eric Draven. It garnered generally positive reviews and performed moderately well in the ratings, but was cancelled after one season. It served as an alternative sequel to the 1994 film and ignoring the events of the film's sequels.

=== Reboot ===
On April 1, 2022, a new attempt at a remake was announced by The Hollywood Reporter, with Bill Skarsgård starring as Eric, Rupert Sanders directing, and Edward R. Pressman and Malcolm Gray co-producing. Days later, the site also reported that FKA Twigs had been cast as Shelly. In July 2022, production on the reboot was reportedly underway in Prague, Czech Republic. By August 26, 2022, Danny Huston was cast as Vincent Roeg. On September 16, 2022, the film wrapped production.

The film was theatrically released on August 23, 2024, by Lionsgate Films, in the United States, and achieved neither the critical nor commercial success of the original.

== See also ==
- List of film and television accidents
- List of live-action films based on cartoons and comics

== Bibliography ==
- Conner, Jeff; Zuckerman, Robert (1993), The Crow: The Movie, Kitchen Sink Press, ISBN 0878162852
- Bridget Baiss. The Crow: the life, death, and rebirth of a classic film, rev'd & updated edn. Essex, Conn.: Applause - Theatre & Cinema Books, 2024.
- Jeff Bond. The Crow: the definitive history. Titan Books, 2025.
- Alisha Mughal. It can't rain all the time: The Crow. Toronto: ECW Press, 2025.
