= C17H19NO3 =

The molecular formula C_{17}H_{19}NO_{3} may refer to:

- Aposcopolamine
- Chavicine
- Coclaurine
- Hydromorphone
- Morphine
- Norcodeine
- Norhydrocodone
- Piperine

== Other uses ==
- A track on the 1994 Fear and Bullets soundtrack album.
- A name used by John Bergin, best known for the band Trust Obey, for solo projects
