= Akira (franchise) =

Toho media franchise

- Created by: Katsuhiro Otomo
- Original work: Akira (1982–1990)
- Owner: MASH-ROOM

Print publications
- Comics: Akira

Films and television
- Film(s): Akira (1988); Akira (unproduced)
- Animated series: Akira (TBA)

Games
- Video game(s): Akira (1988); Akira Psycho Ball (2001)

Akira (アキラ; stylized as AKIRA in English) is a Japanese cyberpunk media franchise based on Katsuhiro Otomo's seminal manga, Akira, published from 1982 to 1990. It was translated into more than a dozen languages and adapted into a 1988 anime film and three video games, among other adaptations.

== Premise ==
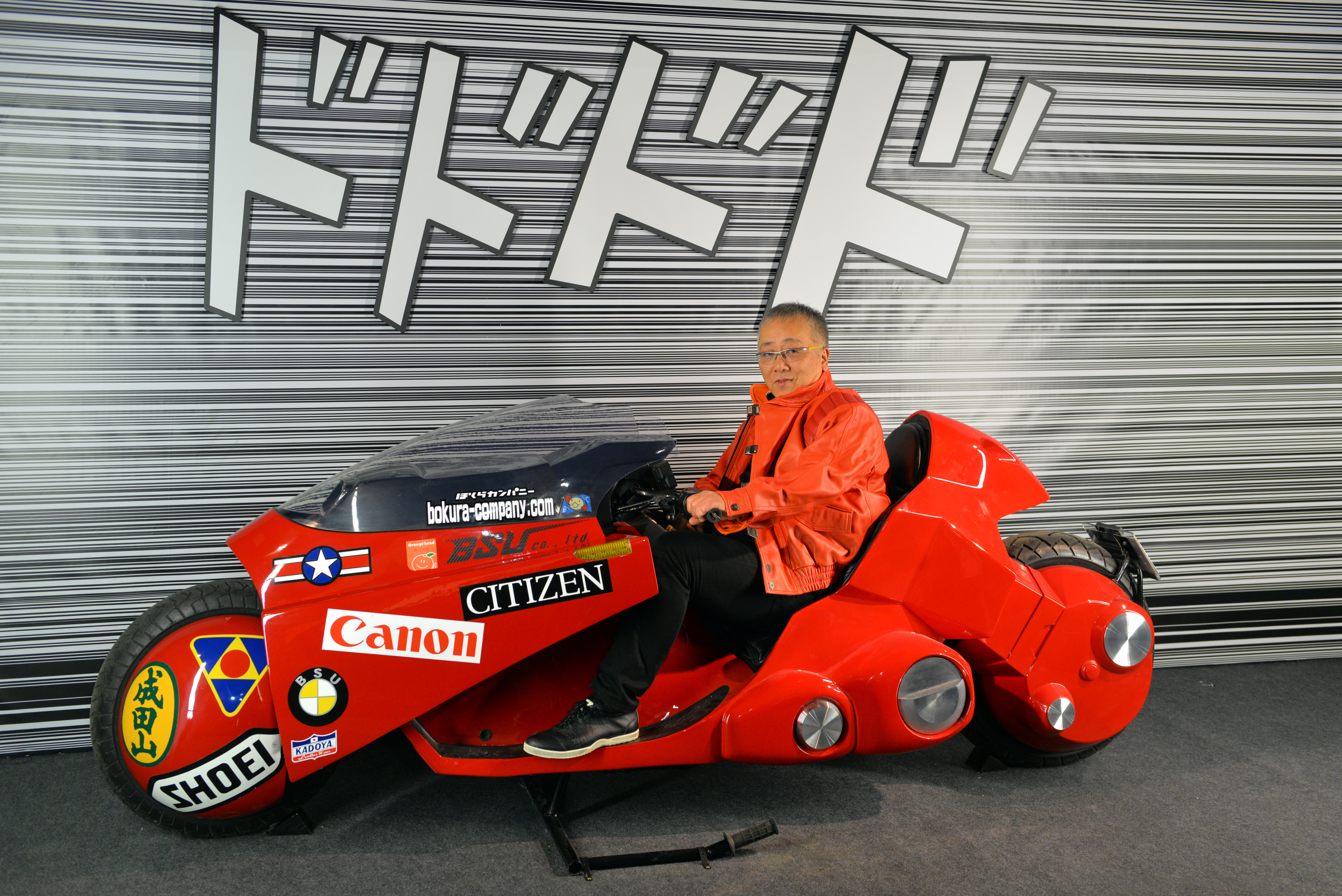
Akira creator Otomo posing on a replica of the futuristic motorcycle driven by Kaneda in Akira

Akira takes place in futurist, cyberpunk "Neo-Tokyo", some decades following the destruction of Tokyo years prior by a massive explosion. A city struggling to prevent crime amid political corruption, the story focuses on Kaneda, the leader of a motorcycle gang, and his friend and fellow member Tetsuo, who is mentally unstable. After a near collision with a childlike Esper, the product of government research to imbue humans with powerful psychokinetic energies, Tetsuo becomes similarly afflicted. As Tetsuo struggles with controlling his new abilities, Kaneda, desperate to learn more, joins forces with a resistance group, including Kei, a woman he takes interest in. As Tetsuo's abilities start to go out of control, the military, led by Colonel Shikishima, take ultimate actions to try to contain him, wanting to prevent the same destruction to Neo-Tokyo as happened before with the test subject Akira in Tokyo years earlier. Kaneda, Kei, Shikishima, and the other Espers work together to try to help Tetsuo come to find peace and end his destructive rampage.

== Works ==
=== Manga ===
Akira was originally serialized in Japan from 1982 to 1990 in Kodansha's Young Magazine, ending with over 2000 pages of Otomo's art. It was published serially in the United States Epic Comics, an imprint of Marvel Comics, colorizing the black and white manga. The choice to colorize the work helped to popularize Akira in the Western world. Six volumes of collected works were published from 2000 to 2002 by Dark Horse Comics, and in the UK by Titan Books, with the license later transferring to Kodansha Comics.

=== Anime feature film ===
Otomo did not plan on having an animated adaptation of Akira, but when the idea was presented to him, he became intrigued, and agreed to allow it as long as he remained in creative control of the film. The film was produced by TMS Entertainment and distributed by Toho across Japan on 16 July 1988; it had limited releases in Western countries. When Akira hit home media around 1992, the film got a new resurgence, and since has been recognized as one of the best animated and science fiction films of all time, and is considered a landmark anime.

=== Video games ===
A companion video game to the film was developed by TOSE and distributed by Taito for personal computers, and released in Japan on 24 December 1988. Titled simply Akira, the game was a text-based adventure game with the text presented over images from the film, with the player deciding what action protagonist Kaneda would take. It received average ratings from Japanese reviewers.

Black Pearl Studios, a subsidiary of THQ, obtained permission from Kodansha to develop a game based on the Akira manga in 1993. Preview footage was shown at the 1994 Consumer Electronics Show. Intended for a 1995 release on the Super NES, Game Boy, Game Gear, Sega Genesis, and Sega CD platforms, the game was never completed due to financial issues at THQ.

In 1994, a British-made action game, simply titled Akira, was released for the Amiga CD32 and is considered one of the console's worst games.

Akira Psycho Ball is a simulated pinball machine video game, featuring elements from the manga and anime, for the PlayStation 2. It was developed by KAZe and released by Bandai on 21 February 2001, with limited release in Europe the following year. The game had generally positive reviews from Japanese reviewers.

== Future works ==
=== Unproduced live-action film ===
Rights to a live-action Akira film were acquired by Warner Bros. in 2002, but since then has had difficulty in getting a project started, with it remaining in development hell. At least five different directors and ten different writers have been attached at various times. While Otomo had given scriptwriters the freedom to modify the plot of Akira as necessary to fit a live-action film, fears remain over whitewashing or racebending in the film's casting as well as trying to relocate the film outside of Japan due to story's ties with Japan's history.

Most recently, director Taika Waititi had been set to lead the film. Initially slated for a 2021 release, following the 2019 announcement that Waititi would direct Thor: Love and Thunder first, Warner Bros removed Akira from its release schedule; as of 2023, the film had not progressed past the writing stage as Waititi continued to take on new projects. In 2025, the film rights reverted to manga publisher Kodansha, effectively putting an end to this iteration of the project.

=== Anime television series ===
As early as January 2016, a potential television series had been in the planning stages with Otomo's involvement. At the 2019 Anime Expo, Otomo announced that he was working with Sunrise to create a new anime television series based on the manga.
