= Eisner Award for Best Publication Design =

Creative achievement award for comics

- Awarded for: Best Publication Design
- Country: United States
- First award: 1993
- Most recent winner: The Essential Peanuts, designed by Shawn Dahl with Chip Kidd
- Website: www.comic-con.org/awards/eisner-awards-current-info

The Eisner Award for Best Publication Design is an award for "creative achievement" in book design in American comic books, presented annually at San Diego Comic-Con.

== Winners and nominees ==
Eisner Award for Best Publication Design winners and nominees
Year	Title	Author(s)/Editor(s)	Publisher	Result	Ref.
1990s
1993	The Sandman: Season of Mists	Dave McKean	DC Comics	Winner	
1993	The Mythology of an Abandoned City	Jon J Muth and The August Company	Graphitti	Nominee	
1993	The Ray Bradbury Chronicles	Dean Motter	Bantam Books	Nominee	
1993	Rubber Blanket	David Mazzucchelli and Richmond Lewis	Rubber Blanket Press	Nominee	
1993	Signal to Noise	Dave McKean	VG Graphics/Dark Horse	Nominee	
1993	Skin Deep	Charles Burns, Dale Crain, and Art Spiegelman	Penguin	Nominee	
1994	Marvels	Comicraft, Kurt Busiek, and Alex Ross	Marvel Comics	Winner	
1994	Best of Drawn & Quarterly	Chris Oliveros	Drawn & Quarterly	Nominee	
1994	Death: The High Cost of Living	Neil Gaiman and Chris Bachalo	DC Comics/Vertigo	Nominee	
1994	Love and Rockets X	Jaime Hernández, Gilbert Hernandez, and Dale Yarger	Fantagraphics	Nominee	
1995	The Acme Novelty Library	Chris Ware	Fantagraphics	Winner	
1995	The Crow	John Bergin	Graphitti	Nominee	
1995	Drawn & Quartlerly	Drawn & Quartlerly	Drawn & Quarterly	Nominee	
1995	Paul Auster's City of Glass	Art Spiegelman	Avon/NeonLit	Nominee	
1995	Violent Cases	Dave McKean	Kitchen Sink	Nominee	
1995	Worlds Collide #1	Jason Scott Jones and Curtis King	Milestone Media / DC Comics	Nominee	
1996	The Acme Novelty Library	Chris Ware	Fantagraphics	Winner	
1996	Betty Boop's Sunday Best	Kevin Lison and Doug Bantz	Kitchen Sink	Nominee	
1996	Blab #8	Monte Beauchamp	Kitchen Sink	Nominee	
1996	Bone vols. 1 and 2	Jeff Smith	Cartoon Books	Nominee	
1996	PalookaVille	Seth	Drawn & Quarterly	Nominee	
1996	Voodoo Child: The Illustrated Legend of Jimi Hendrix deluxe edition	Bobbi Bongard and Lisa Stone	Kitchen Sink	Nominee	
1997	Acme Novelty Library #7	Chris Ware	Fantagraphics	Winner	
1997	Black Eye Productions: Berlin, Dear Julia, and The Sands	Michel Vrana, Jason Lutes, Brian Biggs, and Tom Hart	Black Eye Productions	Nominee	
1997	Buzz Buzz and Giant THB Parade	Paul Pope and C. Rambler	Horse Press	Nominee	
1997	Fax from Sarajevo	Brian Gogolin	Dark Horse	Nominee	
1997	It's a Good Life, If You Don't Weaken	Seth	Drawn & Quarterly	Nominee	
1997	Mr. Monster: Origins limited edition	Richard Bruning and Beatman/Brainstorm	Graphitti	Nominee	
1997	The Sandman: The Wake	Dave McKean	DC Comics/Vertigo	Nominee	
1998	Kingdom Come, deluxe edition	Bob Chapman and Georg Brewer	DC Comics	Winner	
1998	Isaac Mizrahi Presents the Adventures of Sandee the Supermodel	Isaac Mizrahi and William Frawley	Simon & Schuster	Nominee	
1998	R. Crumb Coffee Table Art Book	Pete Poplaski	Kitchen Sink	Nominee	
1998	The Sandman Dust Covers: The Selected Sandman Covers 1989-1996	Dave McKean	DC Comics/Vertigo	Nominee	
1998	Scary Godmother	Jill Thompson	Sirius	Nominee	
1999	Batman Animated	Chip Kidd	HarperCollins	Winner	
1999	Cages, deluxe edition	Dave McKean	Kitchen Sink	Nominee	
1999	Comics: Between the Panels	Tom Gould	Dark Horse	Nominee	
1999	Superman: The Dailies	Chris Shadoian, Evan Metcalf, and Pete Poplaski	DC Comics/Kitchen Sink	Nominee	
1999	Superman: The Complete History	Chip Kidd	Chronicle	Nominee	
2000s
2000	300	Mark Cox	Dark Horse	Winner	
2000	Cave-In	Jordan Crane, Tom Devlin, and Brian Ralph	Highwater Books	Nominee	
2000	Opus, vol. 1	Barry Windsor-Smith	Fantagraphics	Nominee	
2000	Sandman: The Dream Hunters	Georg Brewer and Amie Brockway	DC Comics/Vertigo	Nominee	
2000	Veils	Georg Brewer	DC Comics/Vertigo	Nominee	
2001	Jimmy Corrigan	Chris Ware	Pantheon	Winner	
2001	Drawn & Quarterly, vol. 3	Chris Oliveros	Drawn & Quarterly	Nominee	
2001	The Last Lonely Sunday	Jordan Crane	Red Ink	Nominee	
2001	Little Lit	Chip Kidd and Art Spiegelman	Pantheon	Nominee	
2001	Wonder Woman: The Complete History	Chip Kidd	Chronicle	Nominee	
2002	Acme Novelty Library #15	Chris Ware	Fantagraphics	Winner	
2002	Drawn & Quarterly, vol. 4	Chris Oliveros	Drawn & Quarterly	Nominee	
2002	Non #5	Jordan Crane	Red Ink	Nominee	
2002	OPUS, vol. 2	Barry Windsor-Smith	Fantagraphics	Nominee	
2002	Red Star vol 1: The Battle of Kar Dathra's Gate	Team Red Star	Image	Nominee	
2002	Scatterbrain	Cary Grazzini and Craig Thompson	Dark Horse	Nominee	
2003	Batman: Nine Lives	Amie Brockway-Metcalf	DC Comics	Winner	
2003	Beg the Question	Bob Fingerman	Fantagraphics	Nominee	
2003	Corpus Monstrum	Gary Gianni and Jim Keegan	Hieronymous Press	Nominee	
2003	House at Maakies Corner	Chip Kidd	Fantagraphics	Nominee	
2003	One! Hundred! Demons!	Lynda Barry	Sasquatch Books	Nominee	
2004	Mythology: The DC Comics Art of Alex Ross	Chip Kidd	Pantheon	Winner	
2004	The League of Extraordinary Gentlemen: The Absolute Edition, vol. 1	Todd Klein, Alex Sinclair, and Larry Berry	ABC	Nominee	
2004	Louis Riel: A Comic-Strip Biography	Chester Brown	Drawn & Quarterly	Nominee	
2004	Project: Telstar	Chris Pitzer	AdHouse	Nominee	
2004	Quimby the Mouse	Chris Ware	Fantagraphics	Nominee	
2004	Top Shelf Asks the Big Questions	Brett Warnock and Robert Goodin	Top Shelf	Nominee	
2005	The Complete Peanuts	Seth	Fantagraphics	Winner	
2005	The Art of Usagi Yojimbo	Cary Grazzini	Dark Horse	Nominee	
2005	Clyde's Fans	Seth	Drawn & Quarterly	Nominee	
2005	In the Shadow of No Towers	Art Spiegelman	Pantheon	Nominee	
2005	McSweeney's Quarterly #13	Chris Ware	McSweeney's	Nominee	
2006	Acme Novelty Library Annual Report to Shareholders	Chris Ware	Pantheon	Winner	
2006	Little Nemo in Slumberland: So Many Splendid Sundays	Philippe Ghielmetti	Sunday Press Books	Winner	
2006	Promethea #32	J. H. Williams III and Todd Klein	ABC	Nominee	
2006	Walt and Skeezix	Chris Ware	Drawn & Quarterly	Nominee	
2006	Wimbledon Green	Seth	Drawn & Quarterly	Nominee	
2007	Absolute DC: The New Frontier	Darwyn Cooke	DC Comics	Winner	
2007	Castle Waiting	Adam Grano	Fantagraphics	Nominee	
2007	Lost Girls	Matt Kindt and Brett Warnock	Top Shelf	Nominee	
2007	Popeye: I Yam What I Yam	Jacob Covey	Fantagraphics	Nominee	
2007	The Ticking	Jordan Crane	Top Shelf	Nominee	
2008	Process Recess 2	James Jean and Chris Pitzer	AdHouse	Winner	
2008	(The Complete) Dream of the Rarebit Fiend	Ulrich Merkl	Ulrich Merkl	Nominee	
2008	Complete Terry and the Pirates	Dean Mullaney	IDW	Nominee	
2008	Heroes, vol. 1	John Roshell	WildStorm/DC Comics	Nominee	
2008	Little Sammy Sneeze	Philippe Ghielmetti	AdHouse	Nominee	
2008	Sundays with Walt and Skeezix	Chris Ware	Sunday Press	Nominee	
2009	Hellboy Library Editions	Cary Grazzini and Mike Mignola	Dark Horse	Winner	
2009	Breakdowns: Portraits of the Artist as a Young %@&*!	Art Spiegelman	Pantheon	Nominee	
2009	Comic Book Tattoo	Tom Muller and Rantz Hoseley	Image	Nominee	
2009	What It Is	Lynda Barry	Drawn & Quarterly	Nominee	
2009	Willie and Joe	Jacob Covey	Fantagraphics	Nominee	
2010s
2010	Absolute Justice	Curtis King and Josh Beatman	DC Comics	Winner	
2010	The Brinkley Girls	Adam Grano	Fantagraphics	Nominee	
2010	Gahan Wilson: 50 Years of Playboy Cartoons	Jacob Covey	Fantagraphics	Nominee	
2010	Life and Times of Martha Washington	Dave Nestelle	Dark Horse	Nominee	
2010	Queer Visitors from the Marvelous Land of OZ	Philippe Ghielmetti	Sunday Press	Nominee	
2010	Whatever Happened to the World of Tomorrow?	Neil Egan and Brian Fies	Abrams ComicArts	Nominee	
2011	Dave Stevens' The Rocketeer Artist's Edition	Randall Dahlk	IDW	Winner	
2011	Polly and Her Pals Complete Sunday Comics, vol. 1	Lorraine Turner and Dean Mullaney	IDW	Nominee	
2011	Return of the Dapper Men	Todd Klein	Archaia	Nominee	
2011	75 Years of DC Comics: The Art of Modern Mythmaking	Josh Baker	TASCHEN	Nominee	
2011	Two Generals	Jennifer Lum	McClelland & Stewart	Nominee	
2012	Jim Henson's Tale of Sand	Eric Skillman	Archaia	Winner	
2012	Genius Isolated: The Life and Art of Alex Toth	Dean Mullaney	IDW/Library of American Comics	Nominee	
2012	Kinky & Cosy	Nix	NBM	Nominee	
2012	The MAD Fold-In Collection	Michael Morris	Chronicle	Nominee	
2012	Richard Stark's Parker: The Martini Edition	Darwyn Cooke	IDW	Nominee	
2013	Building Stories	Chris Ware	Pantheon	Winner	
2013	Dal Tokyo	Gary Panter and Family Sohn	Fantagraphics	Nominee	
2013	David Mazzucchelli's Daredevil Born Again: Artist's Edition	Randy Dahlk	IDW	Nominee	
2013	Mister Twee Deedle: Raggedy Ann's Sprightly Cousin	Tony Ong	Fantagraphics	Nominee	
2013	Wizzywig	Ed Piskor and Chris Ross	Top Shelf	Nominee	
2014	Genius, Illustrated: The Life and Art of Alex Toth	Dean Mullaney	LOAC/IDW	Winner	
2014	The Art of Rube Goldberg	Chad W. Beckerman	Abrams ComicArts	Nominee	
2014	Beta Testing the Apocalypse	Tom Kaczynski	Fantagraphics	Nominee	
2014	The Great War: July 1, 1916: The First Day of the Battle of the Somme: A Panorama	Joe Sacco and Chin-Yee Lai	Norton	Nominee	
2014	Little Tommy Lost, Book 1	Cole Closser	Koyama	Nominee	
2015	Little Nemo: Dream Another Dream	Jim Rugg	Locust Moon	Winner	
2015	Batman: Kelley Jones Gallery Edition	Josh Beatman, Brainchild Studios	Graphitti/DC Comics	Nominee	
2015	The Complete ZAP Comix Box Set	Tony Ong	Fantagraphics	Nominee	
2015	Street View	Pascal Rabaté	NBM/Comics Lit	Nominee	
2015	Winsor McCay's Complete Little Nemo	Anna Tina Kessler	TASCHEN	Nominee	
2016	Sandman Gallery Edition	Josh Beatman, Brainchild Studios	Graphitti Designs, DC Comics	Winner	
2016	Beyond the Surface	Nicolas André, Sam Arthur, Alex Spiro, and Camille Pichon	Nobrow	Nominee	
2016	The Eternaut	Tony Ong	Fantagraphics	Nominee	
2016	Eventually Everything Connects	Loris Lora, Sam Arthur, Alex Spiro, and Camille Pichon	Nobrow	Nominee	
2016	King of the Comics: One Hundred Years of King Features Syndicate	Dean Mullaney	IDW	Nominee	
2016	Only What's Necessary: Charles M. Schulz and the Art of Peanuts	Chip Kidd	Abrams ComicArts	Nominee	
2017	The Art of Charlie Chan Hock Chye	Sonny Liew	Pantheon	Winner	
2017	The Complete Wimmin's Comix	Keeli McCarthy	Fantagraphics	Nominee	
2017	Frank in the Third Dimension	Jacob Covey and Charles Barnard	Fantagraphics	Nominee	
2017	The Realist Cartoons	Jacob Covey	Fantagraphics	Nominee	
2017	Si Lewen's Parade: An Artist's Odyssey	Art Spiegelman	Abrams Books	Nominee	
2018	Akira 35th Anniversary Edition	Katsuhiro Otomo, Haruko Hashimoto, Ajani Oloye and Lauren Scanlan	Kodansha USA	Winner	
2018	Celebrating Snoopy	Spencer Williams and Julie Phillips	Andrews McMeel	Nominee	
2018	Monograph	Chris Ware	Rizzoli	Nominee	
2018	My Favorite Thing Is Monsters	Jacob Covey	Fantagraphics	Nominee	
2018	WIll Eisner: The Centennial Celebration, 1917-2017	John Lind	Kitchen Sink, Dark Horse	Nominee	
2019	Will Eisner's A Contract with God: Curator's Collection	John Lind	Kitchen Sink, Dark Horse	Winner	
2019	A Sea of Love	Wilfrid Lupano, Grégory Panaccione, and Mike Kennedy	Magnetic Press/Lion Forge	Nominee	
2019	The Stan Lee Story Collector's Edition	Josh Baker	TASCHEN	Nominee	
2019	The Temple of Silence: Forgotten Worlds of Herbert Crowley	Paul Kepple and Max Vandenberg	Beehive Books	Nominee	
2019	Terry Moore's Strangers in Paradise Gallery Edition	Josh Beatman, Brainchild Studios	Abstract Studio/Graphitti Designs	Nominee	
2020s
2020	Making Comics	Lynda Barry	Drawn & Quarterly	Winner	
2020	Grunt: The Art and Unpublished Comics of James Stokoe	Ethan Kimberling	Dark Horse	Nominee	
2020	Krazy Kat: The Complete Color Sundays	George Herriman and Anna-Tina Kessler	TASCHEN	Nominee	
2020	Logo a Gogo	Rian Hughes	Korero Press	Nominee	
2020	Madness in Crowds: The Teeming Mind of Harrison Cady	Paul Kopple and Alex Bruce	Beehive Books	Nominee	
2021	The Loneliness of the Long-Distance Cartoonist	Adrian Tomine and Marcos Martin	Panel Syndicate	Winner	
2021	Chasin' the Bird: Charlie Parker in California Deluxe Edition	David Chisholm and Tyler Boss	Z2	Nominee	
2021	Dbury@50: The Complete Digital Doonesbury	G. B. Trudeau, George Corsillo, and Susan McCaslin	Andrews McMeel	Nominee	
2021	J & K	John Pham	Fantagraphics	Nominee	
2021	Original Art: The Dan Clowes Studio Edition	Daniel Clowes	Fantagraphics	Nominee	
2022	Marvel Comics Library: Spider-Man Vol. 1: 1962-1964	Ralph Macchio	TASCHEN	Winner	
2022	The Complete American Gods	Ethan Kimberling	Dark Horse	Nominee	
2022	The Complete Life and Times of Scrooge McDuck Deluxe Edition	Justin Allan-Spencer	Fantagraphics	Nominee	
2022	Crashpad	Gary Panter and Justin Allan-Spencer	Fantagraphics	Nominee	
2022	Machine Gun Kelly's Hotel Diablo	Tyler Boss	Z2	Nominee	
2022	Popeye Vol. 1	E. C. Segar and Jacob Covey	Fantagraphics	Nominee	
2023	Parker: The Martini Edition — Last Call	Sean Phillips	IDW	Winner	
2023	Francis Rothbart! The Tale of a Fastidious Feral	Thomas Woodruff, Jacob Covey, and Ryan Dinnick	Fantagraphics	Nominee	
2023	A Frog in the Fall (and later on)	Linnea Sterte, Olle Forsslöf, and Patrick Crotty	PEOW Studio	Nominee	
2023	Joan Jenn & the Blackhearts 40X40: Bad Reputation/I Love Rock-n-Roll	Josh Bernstein and Jason Ullmeyer	Z2	Nominee	
2023	Mazebook Dark Horse Direct Edition	Tom Muller	Dark Horse	Nominee	
2023	Tori Amos: Little Earthquakes, The Graphic Album	Lauryn Ipsum	Z2	Nominee	
2024	Bram Stoker's Dracula and Mary Shelley's Frankenstein boxed set	Mike Kennedy	Magnetic Press	Winner	
2024	Gratuitous Ninja	Ronald Wimberly and Chloe Scheffe	Beehive Books	Nominee	
2024	Inside the Mind of Sherlock Holmes	Donna Askem	Titan Comics	Nominee	
2024	Iron Maiden: Piece of Mind	Josh Bernstein and Rob Schwager	Z2	Nominee	
2024	Toilet-bound Hanako-kun First Stall Box Set	Wendy Chan	Yen Press	Nominee	
2025	David Mazzucchelli's Batman Year One Artist's Edition	Chip Kidd	IDW	Winner	
2025	Bill Ward: The Fantagraphics Studio Edition	Kayla E.	Fantagraphics	Nominee	
2025	Brian Bolland: Batman the Killing Joke and Other Stories & Art, Gallery Edition	Josh Beatman	Graphitti Designs	Nominee	
2025	One Bite at a Time	Ryan Claytor	Elephant Eater Comics	Nominee	
2025	Scott Pilgrim 20th Anniversary color hardcover box set	Patrick Crotty	Oni Press	Nominee	
2025	Walt Disney's Donald Duck: The Ultimate History	Anna-Tina Kessler	TASCHEN	Nominee	
2026	The Essential Peanuts	Shawn Dahl and Chip Kidd	Abrams ComicArts	Winner	
2026	The Art of Manga	Tessa Lee	VIZ Media	Nominee	
2026	Fruits Basket: The Complete Box Set, Collector's Edition #13	Wendy Chan	Yen Press	Nominee	
2026	Red Light Properties: Unfinished Business	Dan Goldman	Kinjin Storylab	Nominee	
2026	The Marvel Art of Michael Allred, Slipcase Edition	Kurtis Findlay	Clover Press	Nominee	
2026	Weird Science Vol. 1 XXL	Anna-Tina Kessler	TASCHEN	Nominee	

== See also ==
- List of design awards
