= Locust (album) =

Studio album by Trust Obey
- Released: 1990
- Genres: Industrial; experimental

Trust Obey chronology
| The Veil (1990) | Locust (1990) | Exit Wound (1991) |

Locust is the third studio album by Trust Obey, self-released in 1990.

== Reception ==
Factsheet Five described Locust as "modern music directed against old spirits of nature" that "has the enigmatic depth of Trust Obey's other works, instrumental throughout and with a manic energy."

== Track listing ==
All music is composed by John Bergin.

Side one
| No. | Title | Length |
|---|---|---|
| 1. | "I Am Hungry" |

Side one
| No. | Title | Length |
|---|---|---|
| 1. | "I Am Thirsty" |

== Personnel ==
Adapted from the Locust liner notes.

Trust Obey

- John Bergin – instruments

== Release history ==
| Region | Date | Label |
|---|---|---|
| United States | 1990 | CS |
