= Sleeping Angel =

Sleeping Angel may refer to:

- "Sleeping Angel", a 1982 song by Stevie Nicks from the soundtrack to Fast Times at Ridgemont High
- "Sleeping Angel", a 1994 song by Trust Obey from Fear and Bullets
