= Hands of Ash =

Studio album by Trust Obey
- Released: July 23, 1996
- Studios: Westend Recording Studios (Kansas City, Missouri)
- Genre: Industrial
- Length: 71:19
- Label: Fifth Colvmn
- Producers: John Bagguley; Julian Beeston; Steve White

John Bergin chronology
Terra Damnata (1994)	Hands of Ash (1996)	Audio Asphyxiation: The John Bergin Special (1996)

Alternative cover
- 2015 reissue

Hands of Ash is the sixth studio album by Trust Obey, released on July 23, 1996, by Fifth Colvmn Records.

== Reception ==
Aiding & Abetting commended Hands of Ash for being "Gothic in the sense of spartan arrangements and black overtones" and that "the production is quite good, leaving just enough of a dull edge on the sound to create an ominous feel." Sonic Boom said "The real potential of this project lies in its DIY production and denial to bend to the will of a producer in its final mastering" and "this album is something any fan of slow, harsh and rumbling ambience will enjoy."

== Track listing ==
All music is composed by John Bergin and Brett Smith.

No.	Title	Length
1.	"Hands of Fire"	8:12
2.	"Hands of Ash"	9:49
3.	"Hands of Glory"	12:17
4.	"Hands of Malice"	16:18
5.	"Hands of Clay"	6:09
6.	"Hands of Iron"	10:18
7.	"Larvatus" (not included in 2015 reissue)	8:16

== Personnel ==
Adapted from the Hands of Ash liner notes.

Trust Obey

- John Bergin – vocals, guitar, bass guitar, keyboards, programming, production, mixing, engineering, editing, cover art, photography, design, voice (1)
- Brett Smith – guitar, engineering, voice (1), horn and snare drum (7)

Additional performers

- David Chapman – voice (1), trumpet (4)

Production and design

- Bart Biechele – recording, voice (1)
- Mike Miller – engineering, editing

== Release history ==
Region	Date	Label	Format	Catalog
United States	1996	Fifth Colvmn	CD	9868–63231
United States	2015	Stompbox13	DL	
