= Exit Wound (Trust Obey album) =

Studio album by Trust Obey
- Released: 1990
- Genres: Industrial; experimental

John Bergin chronology
Locust (1990)	Exit Wound (1990)	Trinity (1994)

Exit Wound is the fourth studio album by Trust Obey, self-released on in 1990. The album has two versions of a song "Fist Fuck", written in 1988 as part composer John Bergin's Orifice project. The themes of the music include gun violence, sex and relationships.

== Reception ==
Factsheet Five compared the music Exit Wound favorably to Big Black and said "these songs seem more observational, almost voyeuristic in intent"

== Track listing ==
All music is composed by John Bergin.

Side one
No.	Title	Length
1.	"Exit Wound"
2.	"Fist Fuck"
3.	"Dog Bite" (Nine Inch Version)
4.	"Drive-By"
5.	".12 Gauge Easy"
6.	".12 Gauge Hard"
7.	"Entrance Wound"

Side one
No.	Title	Length
1.	"Fist Fuck"
2.	"Penis Object #13"
3.	"Date Rape"
4.	"Pipe Bomb"
5.	"Just Bullet"
6.	"FL"

== Personnel ==
Adapted from the Exit Wound liner notes.

Trust Obey

- John Bergin – instruments

== Release history ==
Region	Date	Label
United States	1991	CS
