= Thomas Woodruff =

Thomas Woodruff may refer to:

- Thomas Woodruff (artist) (born 1957), American artist
- Thomas M. Woodruff (1804–1855), United States congressman
- Tom Woodruff (born 1943), American politician in Florida
- Tom Woodruff Jr. (born 1959), American actor, director and special effects supervisor
