= Frame 137 =

Cover of Dark Horse Presents #61 (featuring Frame 137 by James O'Barr)

Frame 137 is a short story that first appeared in issue #61 of Dark Horse Presents in April 1992. It was created by American graphic artist James O'Barr, who is best known as the creator of the comic book series The Crow.

The comic, which is set in a post-apocalyptic version of the future, has been adapted into a short film by Australian filmmaker Judd Tilyard. The short film, which was produced by Tilyard and Liz Tomkins, features an animated sequence of new original artwork from James O'Barr as well as a cover of "Dog Food", the Iggy Pop song referenced in the original graphic novel, from Mondo Generator and featuring Nick Oliveri and Dave Grohl; the track was created for the short film.

== Publication history ==
O'Barr wrote Frame 137 in the early-nineties with plans to create a series of graphic novels to be titled Gothik. Based loosely on the Wizard of Oz and taking place in a bleak, Blade Runner-style setting, several short stories from this cyberpunk universe were published in various comics including IO and Snake Dance, which introduced the "Blixa" character. However, in 1994, his press commitments for The Crow, which had just been released, became too demanding and O'Barr abandoned the pursuit of the graphic novel.

== Adaptations ==
O’Barr authorised an adaptation of the Frame 137 comic into a short film, which was written and directed by Judd Tilyard and released in 2012. They have been collaborating since on a feature film set in the Frame 137 world and based on O'Barr's original unpublished graphic novel, Gothik.

== Plot ==
The 4-page story opens with the young Jonny Z, sitting at the bar of Frame 137 – the underground tech saloon run by Rico, one of the few people Jonny likes and trusts. Jonny's dealer Big T is fashionably late, as always, and Jonny scans the crowd as he wishes cancer variants on T for making him wait.

After Big T shows, Jonny swallows a pharmaceutical rainbow of caps and tabs, which cools his previously tweaking system as he waits for the arrival of his "client", Leo, a Kiddy flesh dealer Jonny's being paid to kill. It's a standard revenge hit, commissioned after Leo moved in and Skinny D's little sister went missing.

When Leo arrives, he has two twin A-Steroid Boys as bodyguards, the group takes a booth near the door and Jonny smiles, noting it's not gonna be Leo's night. Jonny's consciousness drowns in memories and amphetamines, as he approaches the booth contemplating his history and what it means to be an assassin. His ceramic Vach 9mm loaded, and out of sight, Jonny confronts Leo and his A-Boys.

Leo and Jonny stare each other down, threats are exchanged and tension mounts, a standoff, broken when the A-Boys stand, and Jonny blasts them back down. Jonny swings back around to Leo, catching him still seated he presses his gun to Leo's head. Sweating, Leo tries to talk his way out of the situation. Jonny smiles, and pulls the trigger.

Jonny turns and heads for the door. Giving Rico a sign that he'll square up with him for the damage later, he disappears from the bar. The Iggy Pop track "Dog Food" starts playing over the jukebox as Jonny fades back into the night.
