= Akira (manga) =

Japanese manga series by Katsuhiro Otomo

- First volume cover

アキラ
- Genre: Cyberpunk; Political thriller; Post-apocalyptic
- Manga
- Written by: Katsuhiro Otomo
- Published by: Kodansha
- English publisher: AUS: Madman Entertainment; NA: Kodansha USA; UK: Titan Books
- Imprint: Young Magazine KC
- Magazine: Young Magazine
- Original run: December 20, 1982 – June 25, 1990
- Volumes: 6
- Anime film
- Akira (1988)
- Anime
- Studio: Sunrise
- icon

Akira (Japanese: アキラ; stylized as AKIRA) is a Japanese manga series written and illustrated by Katsuhiro Otomo. It was serialized biweekly in Kodansha's seinen manga magazine Young Magazine from December 20, 1982, to June 25, 1990, with its 120 chapters collected into six tankōbon volumes. It was initially published in the United States by Marvel Comics under its Epic imprint, becoming one of the first manga works to be translated in its entirety into English. It is currently published by Kodansha USA in North America.

Set in the a post-apocalyptic and futuristic city of Neo-Tokyo, more than three decades after a mysterious explosion destroyed the city, the story centers on teenage biker gang leader Shotaro Kaneda, militant revolutionary Kei, a trio of Espers, and Neo-Tokyo military leader Colonel Shikishima, who attempt to prevent Tetsuo Shima, Kaneda's mentally unbalanced childhood friend, from using his unstable and destructive telekinetic abilities to ravage the city and awaken a mysterious entity with powerful psychic abilities named "Akira". Otomo uses conventions of the cyberpunk genre to detail a saga of political turmoil, social isolation, corruption, and power. Widely regarded as a landmark work in cyberpunk and credited with pioneering the Japanese cyberpunk subgenre, Akira received universal acclaim from readers and critics, with Otomo's artwork, storytelling, characters, and exploration of mature themes and concepts subject to particular praise. The manga also achieved international commercial success, selling millions of copies worldwide.

Considered a watershed title for the medium, the manga spawned the seminal 1988 anime film adaptation Akira and the greater franchise. The anime film condensed the plot considerably, but retained many of the manga's primary characters and plot elements alongside additional scenes, settings, and motifs. The film was similarly lauded, and had a significant influence on the anime industry and sci-fi media as a whole. The adaptation also marked Otomo's transition from a career primarily in manga to one almost exclusively in animation.

Akira was instrumental in the surge in popularity of manga outside Japan, especially in the United States and France. The manga won several awards, including the Kodansha Manga Award, a Harvey Award, and four Eisner Awards.

== Plot ==
=== Volume 1: Tetsuo ===
On December 6, 1982, (Note: Changed to 1992 in some English editions.) an apparent nuclear explosion destroys Tokyo and starts World War III. By 2019, (Note: Changed to 2030 in some English editions.) a new city called Neo-Tokyo has been built on artificial islands in Tokyo Bay. Although Neo-Tokyo is set to host the XXXII Olympic Games, the city is gripped by anti-government terrorism and gang violence. While exploring the ruins of old Tokyo, Tetsuo Shima, a member of the bōsōzoku gang led by his friend Shotaro Kaneda, is injured when he accidentally crashes his bike into Takashi, child Esper with elderly features who blocked the road. This incident awakens psychic powers in Tetsuo, attracting the attention of a secret government project directed by JSDF Colonel Shikishima. These increasing powers unhinge Tetsuo's mind, exacerbating his inferiority complex and leading him to assume leadership of the rival Clown Gang through violence.

Meanwhile, Kaneda becomes involved with Kei, a member of a resistance organization that stages anti-government terrorist attacks. Led by Ryusaku and opposition Diet leader Nezu, the members get wind of the Colonel's project and a mysterious figure connected with it known as "Akira." They hope to use this leaked information and try to restrict Kaneda's movements because of his involvement with their activities. However, when Tetsuo and the Clowns begin a violent citywide turf war, Kaneda instigates a counter-attack that unites all of Neo-Tokyo's biker gangs against Tetsuo and the Clowns. While the Clown Gang is easily defeated, Tetsuo's psionic powers make him virtually invincible. Tetsuo kills Yamagata, Kaneda's second-in-command, and astonishingly survives after being shot by Kaneda. The Colonel arrives with the powerful drugs needed to suppress Tetsuo's violent headaches, extending Tetsuo an offer to join the project.

=== Volume 2: Akira I ===
After confronting the JSDF, Kaneda, Kei, and Tetsuo are taken into military custody and held in a highly secure skyscraper prison in Neo-Tokyo. Kei soon escapes after becoming possessed as a medium by another Esper, Kiyoko. Kei/Kiyoko briefly does battle with Tetsuo and free Kaneda. After rapidly healing from his wounds, Tetsuo inquires about Akira and forces Doctor Onishi, a project scientist, to take him to the other espers: Takashi, Kiyoko, and Masaru. There, a violent confrontation unfolds between Tetsuo, Kaneda, Kei, and the Espers. The Doctor decides to try to let Tetsuo harness Akira—the project's test subject that destroyed Tokyo—despite Tetsuo's disturbed personality. Upon learning that Akira is being stored in a cryogenic chamber beneath Neo-Tokyo's new Olympic Stadium, Tetsuo escapes the skyscraper with the intent of releasing Akira.

Tetsuo enters the secret military base at the Olympic site the following day, killing many soldiers. The Colonel comes to the base and tries to talk Tetsuo out of his plan; Kaneda and Kei enter the site through the sewers and witness the unfolding situation. Tetsuo breaks open the underground cryogenic chamber and frees Akira, who turns out to be an ordinary-looking little boy. The terror of seeing Akira causes one of the Colonel's men to declare a state of emergency that causes massive panic in Neo-Tokyo. The Colonel himself tries to use SOL, a laser satellite, to kill Tetsuo and Akira, but only succeeds in severing Tetsuo's right arm.

=== Volume 3: Akira II ===
Tetsuo disappears in the subsequent explosion, and Kaneda and Kei come across Akira outside the base. Vaguely aware of who he is, they take him back into Neo-Tokyo. Both the Colonel's soldiers and the followers of an Esper named Lady Miyako begin scouring Neo-Tokyo in search of him. Kaneda, Kei, and a third guerilla, Chiyoko, attempt to find refuge with Akira on Nezu's yacht. However, Nezu betrays them and kidnaps Akira for his use, attempting to have them killed. They survive the attempt and manage to snatch Akira from Nezu's mansion. The Colonel, desperate to find Akira and fed up with the government's tepid response to the crisis, mounts a coup d'état and puts the city under martial law. The Colonel's men join Lady Miyako's acolytes and Nezu's private army in chasing Kaneda, Kei, Chiyoko, and Akira through the city.

The pursuit ends at a canal, with Kaneda's group surrounded by the Colonel's troops. As Akira is being taken into the Colonel's custody, Nezu attempts to shoot Akira rather than have him end up in government hands; he is immediately fired upon and killed by the Colonel's men, with Nezu's own shot missing Akira and hitting Takashi in the head, killing him instantly. The trauma of Takashi's death causes Akira to trigger a second psychic explosion that ravages Neo-Tokyo. Kei, Ryu, Chiyoko, the Colonel, and the other two Espers survive the catastrophe; Kaneda, however, disappears as the blast surrounds him. After the city's destruction, Tetsuo reappears and meets Akira.

=== Volume 4: Kei I ===
Sometime later, an American reconnaissance team led by Lieutenant George Yamada covertly arrives in the ruined Neo-Tokyo. Yamada learns that the city has been divided into two factions: the cult of Lady Miyako, which provides food and medicine for the destitute refugees, and the Great Tokyo Empire, a group of zealots led by Tetsuo with Akira as a figurehead; both are worshipped as deities for performing "miracles." The Empire constantly harasses Lady Miyako's group and kills any intruders with Tetsuo's psychic shock troops. Kiyoko and Masaru become targets for the Empire's fanatical soldiers: Kei, Chiyoko, the Colonel, and Kai, a former member of Kaneda's gang, ally themselves with Lady Miyako to protect them.

Yamada eventually becomes affiliated with Ryu and updates him on how the world has reacted to the events in Neo-Tokyo; they later learn that an American naval fleet approaches nearby. Tetsuo becomes heavily dependent on government-issued pills to quell his headaches. Seeking answers, he visits Lady Miyako at her temple and is given a comprehensive history of the government project that unleashed Akira. Miyako advises Tetsuo to quit the pills to become more powerful; Tetsuo begins a withdrawal. Meanwhile, Tetsuo's aide, the Captain, stages an unsuccessful Empire assault on Miyako's temple. After the Colonel uses SOL to attack the Empire's army, a mysterious event opens a rift in the sky, dumping Kaneda and massive debris from Akira's second explosion.

=== Volume 5: Kei II ===
Kaneda is reunited with Kei and joins Kai and Joker, the former Clown leader, in planning an assault on the Great Tokyo Empire. Meanwhile, an international team of scientists meets up on an American aircraft carrier to study the recent psychic events in Neo-Tokyo, forming Project Juvenile A. Ryu has a falling out with Yamada after learning that he plans to use biological weapons to assassinate Tetsuo and Akira; Yamada later meets up with his arriving commando team. Akira and Tetsuo hold a rally at the Olympic Stadium to demonstrate their powers to the Empire, culminating with Tetsuo tearing a massive hole in the Moon's surface and encircling it with a ring of debris.

Following the rally, Tetsuo's power begins to contort his physical body, causing it to absorb surrounding objects; he later learns that his abuse of his powers has caused them to expand beyond the confines of his body, giving him the ability to transmute inert matter into flesh and integrate it into his physical form. Tetsuo makes a series of visits on board the aircraft carrier to attack the scientists and fight the American fighter jets. Eventually, Tetsuo takes over the ship and launches a nuclear weapon over the ocean. Kei—accepting the role of a medium controlled by Lady Miyako and the Espers—arrives and battles Tetsuo. Meanwhile, Kaneda, Kai, Joker, and their small army of bikers arrive at the Olympic Stadium to begin their all-out assault on the Great Tokyo Empire.

=== Volume 6: Kaneda ===
As Kaneda and the bikers launch their assault on the stadium, Tetsuo returns from his battle with Kei. As his powers continue growing, Tetsuo's body begins involuntarily morphing, and his cybernetic arm is destroyed as his original arm regrows. He then faces Yamada's team but absorbs their biological attacks and temporarily regains control of his powers. Tetsuo kills Yamada and the commandos; he also eludes the Colonel's attempts to kill him by guiding SOL with a laser designator. Kaneda confronts Tetsuo, and the two begin to fight; Kei joins them. However, the brawl is interrupted when the Americans try to carpet bomb Neo-Tokyo and destroy the city outright with their laser satellite, FLOYD. Tetsuo flies into space and brings down FLOYD, causing it to crash upon the aircraft carrier, killing the fleet admiral and one of the scientists.

After the battle, Tetsuo tries to resurrect Kaori, a girl he loved who was killed in the battle. He succeeds to a small degree but is unable to maintain focus. He retreats to Akira's cryogenic chamber beneath the stadium, carrying her body. Kaneda and his friends appear to fight Tetsuo once more, but his powers transform him into a monstrous, amoeba-like mass resembling a fetus, absorbing everything near him. Tetsuo pulls the cryogenic chamber above ground and drops it onto Lady Miyako's temple. Lady Miyako dies while defying Tetsuo after guiding Kei into space to fire upon him with SOL. Kei's attack awakens Tetsuo's full powers, triggering a psychic reaction similar to Akira's. With the help of Kiyoko, Masaru, and the spirit of Takashi, Akira cancels out Tetsuo's explosion with one of his own. They are also able to free Kaneda, who was trapped in Tetsuo's mass. He witnesses the truth about the Espers' power as they, alongside Akira and Tetsuo, ascend to a higher plane of existence.

The United Nations sends peacekeeping forces to provide aid to the survivors of Neo-Tokyo. Kaneda and his friends confront them, declaring the city's sovereignty as the Great Tokyo Empire and warning them that Akira still lives. Kaneda and Kei meet up with the Colonel and part ways amicably. As Kaneda and Kei ride through Neo-Tokyo with their allies, they are joined by ghostly visions of Tetsuo and Yamagata. They also see the city shedding its ruined façade, returning to its former splendor.

== Characters ==
Kaneda (金田)

Kaneda (born September 5, 2003), full name Shotaro Kaneda (金田 正太郎, Kaneda Shōtarō), is the main protagonist of Akira. He is an antiheroic, brash, carefree delinquent and the leader of a motorcycle gang. Kaneda is best friends with Tetsuo, a member who he has known since childhood, but their friendship was ruined after Tetsuo gained and abused his psychic powers. He becomes involved with the terrorist resistance movement and forms an attraction for their member Kei, which eventually develops into a strong romantic bond between the two. During the events of volume 3, Kaneda is surrounded by the explosion caused by Akira and is transported to a place "beyond this world", according to Lady Miyako. Kaneda returns at the end of volume 4, and alongside the Colonel, Joker, Ryu, Kai, Miyako, the Espers and Kei, they take down Tetsuo. Kaneda is ranked as #11 on IGN's Top 25 Anime Characters of All Time list.
Kei (ケイ)
Kei (born March 8, 2002), full name unknown, is the secondary protagonist of Akira. Strong-willed and sensitive, she is a member of the terrorist resistance movement led by the government mole Nezu. She initially claims to be the sister of fellow resistance fighter Ryu, though it is implied that this is not true. Kei at first views Kaneda with contempt, finding him arrogant, gluttonous and chauvinistic. However, in volume 4, Lady Miyako deduces that she has fallen in love with him, and they become romantically involved following Kaneda's return in volume 5. Kei is a powerful medium who cannot use psychic powers of her own but can channel the powers of others through her body. She is taken in by Lady Miyako and plays a critical role in the final battle.
Tetsuo (鉄雄)

Tetsuo (born July 29, 2004), full name Tetsuo Shima (島 鉄雄, Shima Tetsuo), is the main antagonist of Akira. He evolves from Kaneda's best friend and gang member to his nemesis. He is involved in an accident at the very beginning of the story, which causes him to display immense psychic powers. He is soon recruited by the Colonel and became a test subject known as No. 41 (41号, Yonjūichi-gō). It is mentioned that he is Akira's successor; however, Tetsuo's mental instability increases with the manifestation of his powers, which ultimately drives him insane and he ruins his friendship with Kaneda. Later in the story, he becomes Akira's second-in-command, before he begins to lose control of his powers. Eventually, Kei battles Tetsuo, unlocking his full power and triggering another psychic explosion. Akira, watched by his fellow Espers, absorbs Tetsuo's explosion by creating one of his own. With Akira and the espers, he ascends to a higher plane of existence.
The Colonel (大佐, Taisa)
The Colonel (born November 15, 1977), last name Shikishima (敷島), is the head of the secret government project conducting research on psychic test subjects (including the Esper children, Tetsuo, and formerly Akira). Although he initially appears to be an antagonist, the Colonel is an honorable and dedicated soldier committed to protecting Neo-Tokyo from any second onslaught of Akira. Later in the story, he provides medical aid to an ill Chiyoko and works with Kei. He is usually referred to by Kaneda as "The Skinhead", due to his distinctive crew cut.
The Espers
The Espers, also known as the Numbers (ナンバーズ, Nanbāzu), are three children who are test subjects for the secret project. They are the only survivors of the test, following that of Lady Miyako (No. 19), and given numbers between twenty and thirty. No. 23 was shown in the final chapter to have been amongst those "in whom the power awoke" but "were left with crippling handicaps". At the time of the story, test subjects Nos. 29, 30 and 31 are not mentioned, Nos. 32, 33, 36, 37, 38 and 40 had died from brain injuries during treatment and Nos. 34, 35 and 39, who was in the secret base when Akira destroyed Neo-Tokyo, were subsequently listed as missing (they do not appear in the story). Akira was the only one of this generation with true power, with the others being evaluated as "harmless" (their considerable powers notwithstanding; they did not, however, represent a destructive threat of Akira's magnitude). The three have the bodies of children but chronologically are in their late 30s. Their bodies and faces have wizened with age, but they have not physically grown. They are former acquaintances of Akira and survived the destruction of Tokyo. The Espers include:

Kiyoko (キヨコ; designated No. 25 (25号, Nijūgo-gō))
Kiyoko (born 1979) is an Esper who is confined to a bed at all times due to her lack of strength, which is why her companions Takashi and Masaru are protective of her. She can use teleportation, precognition and psychokinesis (as shown when levitating herself and Takashi's corpse when Akira destroys Neo-Tokyo). She predicted the demise of Neo-Tokyo and Tetsuo's involvement with Akira but did not tell the Colonel the full story right away. She is also shown to be a mother figure and leader of the other Espers for decision making.
Takashi (タカシ; designated No. 26 (26号, Nijūroku-gō))
Takashi (born 1980) is the first Esper to be introduced when he causes Tetsuo's accident in self-defense. He has the power to use psychokinesis and communicates with his fellow psychics telepathically. Takashi is a quiet, softspoken boy who has conflicting thoughts of the government and the people who had sheltered him and his friends, which was why he escaped the Colonel's facility; however, Takashi is concerned for Kiyoko's safety, and that forces him to stay. Takashi is accidentally killed by Nezu in his attempt to assassinate Akira, and the psychic trauma revolving around it afterward caused Akira to destroy Neo-Tokyo with his immense powers. He is revived along with the rest of the deceased Espers near the end of the series.
Masaru (マサル; designated No. 27 (27号, Nijūnana-gō))
Masaru (born 1980) is overweight and confined either to a wheelchair or a special floating chair as a result of developing polio at a young age. He has the power to use psychokinesis and communicates with his fellow psychics telepathically. He is braver than Takashi and is the first to attack Tetsuo when he tries killing Kiyoko. Masaru looks after the well-being of his friends, especially that of Kiyoko who is physically frail.

Akira (アキラ; designated No. 28 (28号, Nijūhachi-gō))
Akira is the eponymous character of the series. He has immense psychic powers, although from outward appearances he looks like a small, normal child. He is responsible for the destruction of Tokyo and the beginning of World War III. After the war, he was placed in cryogenics not far from the crater created by him, and the future site of the Neo-Tokyo Olympic Games. Shortly after being awoken by Tetsuo, he destroys Neo-Tokyo during a confrontation between Kaneda and the Colonel's forces. Later in the story, he becomes Emperor of the Great Tokyo Empire. When he first appears, Akira has not aged in the decades he was kept frozen. Akira is essentially an empty shell; his powers have overwritten and destroyed his personality, leaving someone who rarely speaks or reacts, with a constant blank expression on his face. In the end, he is shot by Ryu while psychically synced with the increasingly unstable Tetsuo. It is at this moment he is reunited with his friends and regains his personality.
Kai (甲斐)
Kai (Note: Named Kaisuke in some English editions.) (born January 8, 2004) is a loyal, high-ranking member of Kaneda's gang. He is known for his unorthodox fashion sense, such as neckties, which he adopts to appear intelligent and sophisticated. He is detained by the army and placed in a reform school following the climax of volume 1, but returns in volume 4. Forming alliances with Kei and Lady Miyako, as well as Joker and Kaneda, he plays an instrumental role in the build-up to Kaneda's showdown with Tetsuo.
Yamagata (山形)
Yamagata (born November 9, 2003) is a member of Kaneda's gang who serves as Kaneda's right-hand-man. Known for his aggressive, ready-to-fight behavior, he is killed by Tetsuo's powers in volume 1 after attempting to shoot him when Kaneda, unable to kill Tetsuo, loses his gun.
Joker (ジョーカー, Jōkā)
Joker is the leader of the Clowns, a motorcycle gang made up of junkies and drug addicts. Joker plays a small role in the beginning but becomes more prominent much later in the story as an ally of Kaneda and Kai. He wears clown face paint and often changes the pattern.
Nezu (根津)
Nezu (born December 11, 1964) is an opposition parliament member who is also the leader of the terrorist resistance movement against the government. He seems to be the mentor of Kei and Ryu and purports to be saving the nation from the corrupt and ineffective bureaucrats in power. It soon becomes evident, however, that Nezu is just as corrupt, and all that he seeks to do is to seize power for himself. He later betrays Lady Miyako, as well as various other characters, as he attempts to take control of Akira. After losing Akira, he finds Ryu in a dark corridor with the boy in tow. He attempts to kill Ryu, thinking he is a member of Lady Miyako's group all along. Ryu, however, shoots Nezu. He later tries to shoot Akira before he can be taken into the Colonel's custody. He misses and shoots Takashi in the head, instantly killing him. He is in turn shot and killed by the Colonel's men.
Ryu (竜, Ryū)
Ryu (born May 31, 1992), short for Ryusaku (竜作, Ryūsaku), is a comrade of Kei's in the resistance movement. As the story progresses, Ryu abandons his terrorist roots and becomes more heroic, working with Yamada and guiding Kaneda to Akira's chamber where Tetsuo is held up, but battles with alcoholism. In the final volume, Ryu reluctantly shoots and "kills" Akira when he begins to release his power; he is killed by falling elevator debris shortly afterward.
Chiyoko (チヨコ)
Chiyoko is a tough, heavyset woman and weapons expert who is involved in the resistance and eventually becomes a key supporting character. She acts as a mother figure to Kei.
The Doctor (ドクター, Dokutā)
The Doctor (born January 28, 1958), last name Onishi (大西, Ōnishi), is the head scientist of the secret psychic research project and also serves as the Colonel's scientific advisor. He belonged to the second generation of scientists overseeing the project after Akira killed the first. It is his curiosity and negligence for anyone's well-being that unlocks and nurtures Tetsuo's destructive power in the first place. When Akira is freed by Tetsuo from his cryogenic lair, the Doctor fails to get inside the shelter and freezes to death.
Lady Miyako (ミヤコ様, Miyako-sama)

Lady Miyako is a former test subject known as No. 19. She is shown to possess precognitive and telepathic powers, as well as, in the final altercation with Tetsuo, telekinetic abilities. She is the high priestess of a temple in Neo-Tokyo and a major ally of Kaneda and Kei as the story progresses. Lady Miyako is also an initial ally of Nezu and gives Tetsuo a lecture on his powers. She plays an instrumental role in the final battle with Tetsuo at the cost of her own life, and after her death speaks to Kaneda when he, having previously been absorbed by Tetsuo, is transported to a place "beyond this world".

Sakaki (サカキ; also 榊)
Sakaki is an empowered and fond disciple of Lady Miyako and apparent leader of her team of three. Although small and unassuming, she uses her powers to become much faster and stronger than the average person. Tomboyish in appearance, she is sent to battle the Espers, the military, Kaneda, and Nezu to recover Akira. Sakaki only appears in the third volume, in which she is killed by the military. Before her death Lady Miyako utters Sakaki's name, emphasizing their close relationship.
Mozu (モズ)
Mozu is a girl, plump in appearance, who is an empowered and fond disciple of Lady Miyako. She later teams with Sakaki and Miki to recover Akira. Mozu only appears in the third volume, in which she is killed by a reluctant Takashi who psychically turns her attack back on her.
Miki (ミキ)
Miki is an empowered girl, gaunt in appearance and third fond disciple of Lady Miyako. She only appears in the third volume, in which she is killed by Nezu's henchmen.

The Great Tokyo Empire (大東京帝国, Dai Tōkyō Teikoku)
The Great Tokyo Empire is a small army which rises amid the ruins of Neo-Tokyo after its destruction at the hands of Akira, made up of crazed zealots who worship Akira as an Emperor for the "miracles" he performs, though the power lies squarely with his so-called Prime Minister, Tetsuo. Disorganized and unruly, the army rejects outside aid and wars with Lady Miyako's followers. Tetsuo secretly drugs the rations distributed to its members. At the end of the story, Kaneda and friends take the Empire's name and declare Neo-Tokyo a sovereign nation, expelling the American and United Nations forces that land in the city.

Kaori (カオリ)
Kaori is a young girl who appears late in the story and is recruited as one of Tetsuo's sex slaves. She later becomes an object of his sincere affections. Kaori also serves as Akira's babysitter. She is later shot in the back by the Captain. Tetsuo attempts to resurrect her but fails.
The Captain (隊長, Taichō)
The Captain is an opportunist, posing as a fanatical devotee of Tetsuo who serves him as his aide-de-camp late in the story but secretly desires control of the Great Tokyo Empire. Despite his scheming, the Captain shows some compassion, begging Tetsuo not to kill or harm the young women he has procured for him as they still have families. During the confrontation between Tetsuo and the U.S. Marines, he is caught in the crossfire and is killed by the bacterial gas Yamada uses.
The Birdman (鳥男, Tori Otoko)
The Birdman is one of Tetsuo's elite psychic shock-troops. He wears a blindfold and is frequently standing atop ruined buildings and rafters, observing and reporting on the goings-on within the Empire's turf, and essentially acting as a security system. It is implied that his psychic powers allow him to sense sights and sounds from a great distance, further embodied by the all-seeing eye drawn on his forehead. He also possesses telepathic (his announcements are observed by a Marine to be "like a voice in my head") and telekinetic abilities. Birdman dies when Yamada knocks him from his perch, causing him to fall to his death.
The Eggplant man (ホーズキ男, Hōzuki Otoko)
The Eggplant man is a member of Tetsuo's shock troops. He is described as a fat, short man with glasses who encounters Yamada and the Marines at Olympic Stadium. He was friends with Birdman, and attempts to telekinetically crush a Marine's heart before being executed by Yamada.

Lieutenant Yamada (山田中尉, Yamada-chūi)
Lieutenant Yamada, full name George Yamada (ジョージ 山田, Jōji Yamada), is a Japanese-American soldier who is sent on a mission to assassinate Akira and Tetsuo in the latter half of the story after Akira has leveled Neo-Tokyo. Yamada plans to kill the two powerful psychics with darts containing a biological poison. He is later joined by a team of U.S. Marines to carry out the mission at the Olympic Stadium after it becomes the headquarters for Akira and Tetsuo's Great Tokyo Empire. However, the biochemical weapons fail to harm Tetsuo, instead giving him temporary control of his expanding powers again. He then kills Yamada.
Juvenile A (ジュヴィナイルA, Juvinairu Ē)
Juvenile A is an international team of scientists who are appointed to investigate psychic events in Neo-Tokyo in the latter half of the story. Its members include Dr. Dubrovsky (ドブロフスキー博士, Doburofusukī-hakase), Dr. Simmons (シモンズ博士, Shimonzu-hakase), Dr. Jorris (ジョリス博士, Jorisu-hakase), Dr. Hock (ホック博士, Hokku-hakase), Professor Bernardi (ベルナルディ教授, Berunarudi-kyōju), and lama Karma Tangi (カルマ・タンギ, Karuma Tangi).

== Production ==
=== Conception ===
I wanted to draw this story set in a Japan similar to how it was after the end of World War II—rebelling governmental factions; a rebuilding world; foreign political influence, an uncertain future; a bored and reckless younger generation racing each other on bikes. Akira is the story of my own teenage years, rewritten to take place in the future. I never thought too deeply about the two main characters as I made them; I just projected how I was like when I was younger. The ideas naturally flowed out from my own memories.

— Katsuhiro Otomo, on the birth of Akira

For some time, Kodansha had been repeatedly asking Otomo to create a series for their new manga magazine Young Magazine, but he was busy with other work for another publisher and turned them down. After finishing Farewell to Weapons (1981) for Young Magazine, he started thinking of a new project. At his first meeting with the publisher, Otomo proposed for Akira to be a relatively short work of about ten chapters "or something like that," as Otomo said he was "really not" expecting it to be a success.

Otomo had previously created Fireball (1979), a series in which he disregarded accepted manga art styles and established his interest in science fiction as a setting. Fireball anticipated a number of plot elements of Akira, with its story of young freedom fighters trying to rescue one of the group's older brother who was being used by the government in psychic experiments, with the older brother eventually unleashing a destructive "fireball" of energy. Due to a lack of planning, Otomo had to hastily end Fireball without the finale he wanted; he later stated, "You could say that Akira was born from the frustration I had about that at the time." (Otomo had also used a science-fiction setting the following year in Domu: A Child's Dream, which won the Nihon SF Taisho Award and Seiun Award and became a bestseller.) Not wanting to repeat what happened with Fireball, Otomo had the basic plot of Akira outlined from the start in a two-page synopsis and predicted he would finish it in six months; as with Domu, however, new ideas and problems immediately came up, and the story gradually expanded as he wrote.

The story may have drawn inspiration from Alfred Bester's 1953 novel The Demolished Man, which included government oversight of psychic individuals ("Espers"), latent psychic evolution, and the social consequences of extraordinary mental powers. Author Mark Schilling's The Encyclopedia of Japanese Pop Culture mentions that Otomo also cited the influence of the 1977 film Star Wars on Akira. Both properties feature cinematic ambition and mythic-scale science fiction.

Mitsuteru Yokoyama's manga series Tetsujin 28-go (1956–1966) had particular influence on Akira, as Otomo wanted to pay homage to the children's manga. He explained, "the grand plot for Akira is about an ultimate weapon developed during wartime and found during a more peaceful era. So the accidents and story develop around that ultimate weapon. If you know Tetsujin 28-go, then this is the same overall plot." In addition, the naming conventions of Akira match the characters featured in Tetsujin 28-go: Kaneda shares his name with Yokoyama's protagonist; Colonel Shikishima shares his name with Professor Shikishima of Tetsujin 28-go, while Tetsuo is named after Shikishima's son Tetsuo Shikishima; Akira's Ryūsaku is named after Ryūsaku Murasame. In addition, Takashi has a "26" tattooed on his hand which closely resembles the typeface used in Tetsujin 28-go. The namesake of the series, Akira, is the 28th in a line of psychics that the government has developed—the same number as Tetsujin-28.

With Akira, Otomo's most ambitious work to date, he wanted to evoke the later Shōwa era, including preparations for the Olympic Games, the country's rapid economic growth, and the student protests of the 1960s. "I wanted to recreate the assorted elements that built this era and craft an exciting story that would seem believable enough in reality." Otomo said that while there had been post-apocalyptic works before, he could not think of one that depicted an apocalypse in the middle of the story and wanted to do that with Akira.

=== Development ===
With Akira, Otomo wanted to "dig deeper into [his] issues" with speed and flow, telling a story with as few words as possible, "edit it to gain that sense of speed and make people read it faster, and at the same time make them stop cold at the important scenes." When it started, he was drawing 20 pages a chapter, for a total of 40 pages a month. Otomo began the process for each chapter by fully completing the first page as practice. In order to save time, he did not bother with character-pose sketches or the like; he drew directly onto the page he was submitting to the editors. After he drew each page, his assistant inked the lines of the buildings and the rest of the backgrounds with a Rotring pen and a ruler. Otomo would complete the rough draft two days before his deadline. He would spend half a day drawing the characters, then finish the buildings by adding dust, crevices and cracks to windows. Otomo estimated that they would finish the final rough draft at 5 a.m. on Sunday, ink the characters by 7 p.m., and then submit the completed chapter at 8 a.m. Monday morning. When Otomo began production on the anime film adaptation of Akira, he said the manga had a weekly schedule of 20 pages a week. So he hired a second assistant to help, and occasionally brought in a third just to handle the screentone. "When the manga deadline drew near, we'd pull several all-nighters, then I'd walk right into the anime studio the day after." Manga artist and film director Satoshi Kon was an uncredited assistant on the series.

The image model for the character Akira was Shōryū from Saiyūki (1960). Otomo liked his sorrowful expression and used him as a reference after deciding to make Akira a child. While editing his film Jiyū wo Warera ni, Otomo would often hear someone in the studio next door yell "Akira!", which he took to be the name of the assistant director. Because in the film industry the name "Akira" is often used to refer to Akira Kurosawa, Otomo "thought that gap" was funny and decided to use the name in his work one day. The character names Tetsuo and Kaneda, and the Espers' codenames of Nos. 25–28, were taken from Tetsujin 28-go. Kaneda's iconic motorcycle from the manga had no specific design. So Otomo said it came out "kind of random" and changed every time he drew it. The character Chiyoko was originally designed to be an old man, but Otomo felt that was too ordinary and "a little boring" and came up with the idea for an old lady, which then became a large older lady. The character grew on him as he drew and she ended up with a greater role than he originally planned.

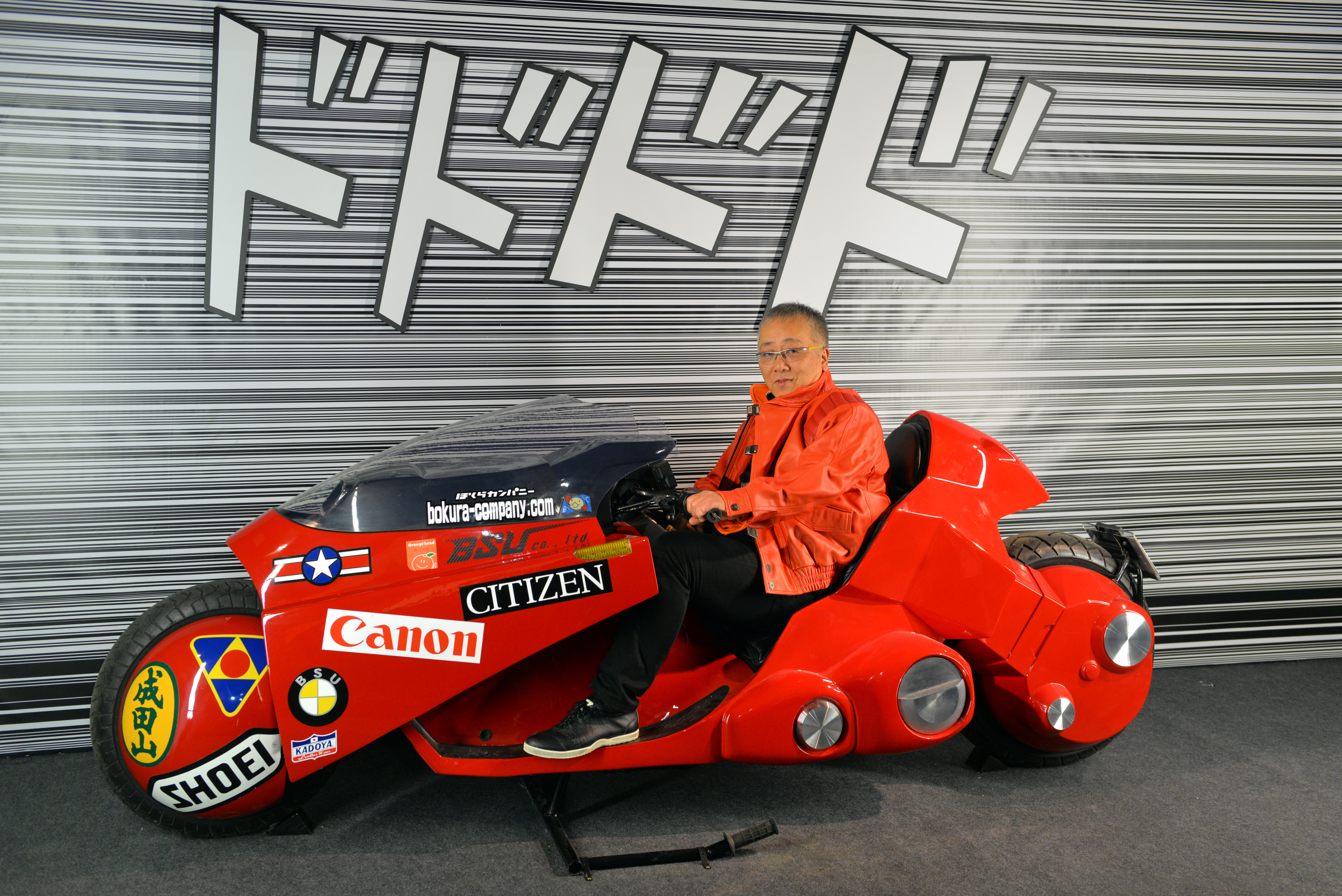
Otomo posing on a replica of the futuristic motorcycle driven by Kaneda in Akira (2016)

The logo for the manga changed several times throughout its serialization, including switching between Japanese and English. The first 35 chapters used katakana in the font Thick Textbook, chosen by Otomo for its ease of understanding and impact. After getting tired of this logo and having entered "Chapter 2" a few chapters previously, he used English in Broadway for chapter 36 because he wanted an Art Deco feel. However, Otomo did not like it when he saw the magazine and for chapters 37–48 he changed the font to a different Art Deco-style and wrote his name in English as "OHTOMO KATSUHIRO". Otomo was often drawing Art Deco-styled skyscrapers on the title pages at this time, but that stopped when Neo Tokyo is destroyed in the story, at which point the logo changed again and he removed the "H" from his surname. The fourth logo for Akira, used for chapters 49–71, returned to using katakana and was created by manga artist Hiroshi Hirata as Otomo wanted a Japanese calligraphy-style. Otomo's name was still written in English until chapter 55. Having come to the "final chapter" of the series, Otomo figured he should change the logo again and went with an English font similar to Impact for the title and his name for chapters 72–120. He had already been using Impact with the top "trimmed off", which gives a dignified and American comics feel, for the covers of the collected volumes. However, some fans believe some of the fonts actually used do not match the above named typefaces.

Otomo was meticulous in creating the collected tankōbon volumes of Akira, often leading to them being released late. During serialization he faced not only schedule deadlines but also page limits and would have to cut content in order to fit said limit. He therefore would draw rough designs of what he actually "wanted" to draw in the margins of the chapters' manuscripts so that he would remember when the time came to redraw the collected volume. He also had to make alterations in the collected volumes due to all the chapter title pages being removed and to make sure two-page spreads ended up on opposing pages. He wanted everything about the collected volumes, including the page count and paintings, to give a deep and full American comics feel. The covers are entirely in English, but he said this was not with an eye towards global distribution, and that he simply "had this incredible enthusiasm to just try to make something new." With its all-English cover, B5 size and painted page edges, the first volume of Akira was a sensation in Japan.

Otomo painted the cover illustration of the first volume very thick, while its inside cover illustration was influenced by Tetsuji Fukushima's manga Sabaku no Maō and how he used colors like American comics. Because the first volume had a "hot" red cover, Otomo felt volume two should have a "cool" one. Its back cover image was created using video, and he said he ruined Kodansha's VCR by repeatedly changing the color balance to get it right. Following the American and European cover images of the previous two volumes, Otomo felt the third should have an Asian one and so included the signs in its background. Its back cover is a composite photograph taken during a race at the Tokyo Racecourse when an image of Akira was shown on the jumbotron. Because the first three images had followed a pattern of "action-silence-action," the artist figured volume four should continue it and so drew Akira sitting down for the cover. Its back cover features an original Akira pinball machine created by Taito with animation cels pasted onto it by Otomo. The cover of volume five was the first to feature an event actually related to the content inside the book. Its back cover features an Otomo-designed decorative bamboo rake that cost 2 million yen to make and features a custom made Miyako doll and mecha models. Otomo felt the sixth cover had to be cool because it was the final one, and as a result it went through the most number of rough designs, as he had to really work to get Kaneda's line of sight towards the reader without it feeling forced. For the back cover photograph, a life-size kiosk featuring numerous Akira goods was constructed in Kodansha's studio with cooperation from Sudo Art Workshop and a stage manager from Nikkatsu. Construction—which included two fluorescent signs (cropped out of the final image) and handmade newspapers—and shooting took three days.

== Themes ==
Akira, like some of Otomo's other works (such as Domu), revolves around the basic idea of individuals with superhuman powers, especially psychokinetic abilities. These are not central to the story, however, which instead concerns itself with character, societal pressures and political machination. Motifs common in Akira include youth alienation, government corruption and inefficiency, and a military grounded in old-fashioned Japanese honor, displeased with the compromises of modern society.

American film historian David Desser writes in Multiple Modernities that Akira is a "direct outgrowth of war and postwar experiences." He argues that Otomo grounds the work in recent Japanese history and culture, using the atomic bombing of Japan during World War II, alongside the economic resurgence and issues relating to overcrowding as inspirations and underlying issues. Thematically, the work centers on the nature of youth to rebel against authority, control methods, community building and the transformation experienced in adolescent passage. The latter is best represented in the work by the morphing experienced by characters.

Manga critic Susan J. Napier identifies this morphing and metamorphosis as a factor that marks the work as postmodern: "a genre which suggests that identity is in constant fluctuation." She also sees the work as an attack on the Japanese establishment, arguing that Otomo satirizes aspects of Japanese culture: in particular, schooling and the rush for new technology. Akira's central image of characters aimlessly roaming the streets on motorbikes is seen to represent the futility of the quest for self-knowledge. The work also focuses on loss, with all characters in some form orphaned and having no sense of history. The landscapes depicted are ruinous, with old Tokyo represented only by a dark crater. The nihilistic nature of the work is felt by Napier to tie into a wider theme of pessimism present in Japanese fantasy literature of the 1980s.

According to anthropologist Dolores P. Martinez, the serial nature of the work influenced the storyline structure, allowing for numerous sub-plots, a large cast, and an extended middle sequence. This allowed for a focus on destructive imagery and afforded Otomo the chance to portray a strong sense of movement. The work has no consistent main character, but Kaneda and Tetsuo are featured the most prominently throughout.

== Publication ==
Written and illustrated by Katsuhiro Otomo, Akira was serialized biweekly in Kodansha's Young Magazine from December 20, 1982, to June 25, 1990. Otomo agreed to an anime film adaptation of the work, provided he retained creative control. This insistence was based on his experiences working on character designs for the 1983 anime Genma Wars: Har-Magedon. While working on the Akira anime, Otomo took a lengthy break on the manga, between chapters 87 on April 20, 1987, and 88 on November 21, 1988. (The film was released theatrically in Japan in July 1988, and followed by limited theatrical releases in various Western territories from 1989 to 1991.) Even when Young Magazine became a weekly publication in 1989, Otomo and Akira retained a biweekly schedule. The 120 chapters and more than 2,000 pages were collected and released in six tankōbon volumes by publisher Kodansha between September 21, 1984, and March 23, 1993.

A five-volume anime comic version created using scenes from the film adaptation was published between August 29 and December 6, 1988, with newly painted covers by Otomo. The colored version created for America by Marvel Comics was published in Japan in 12 volumes between October 7, 1988, and September 20, 1996.

=== English publication ===
Otomo and Kodansha's Yasumasa Shimizu visited New York City in 1983 to meet with Archie Goodwin of Marvel Comics, who had seen Akira and wanted to publish it in America. Shimizu said that Kodansha had received offers from many other publishers, including the newly established Viz Media, but Otomo chose Goodwin because he was really close to French artists that Otomo was a fan of. Otomo did not want Akira to be seen as some "strange thing from Japan," leading to a meticulous and now-"unimaginable" process of altering the art and coloring to make it accessible to American audiences. Because Japanese manga is read right-to-left, the artwork had to be flipped to read the other way. However, the process was not as simple as mirroring, as backgrounds had to be redone in order to remove the Japanese sound effects and reshape the word balloons to fit the Roman alphabet. So Otomo went in and made substantial retouches and adjustments that are specific to the American version.

Japanese manga is largely in black and white, but it was decided that the artwork would be fully colored in the English version of Akira to match most American and European comics. The coloring was done by Steve Oliff at Olyoptics, who was hand-picked for the role by Otomo after being introduced by Goodwin. Otomo sent Oliff illustrations that he colored with markers as samples. Oliff had also received slides from the anime film adaptation of Akira to use as reference. At one point, Otomo visited Oliff in Point Arena, California and worked alongside him for several days, but after the first 5 or 6 issues, Oliff said he was given free rein. Oliff persuaded Marvel to use computer coloring. The coloring was more subtle than that seen before and far beyond the capabilities of Japanese technology of the time. It played an important part in Akira's success in Western markets, and revolutionized the way comics were colorized. Coloring lasted from 1988 to 1994, being delayed by Otomo's work on Steamboy. Akira was the first comic in the world to be colored digitally, using computers. Its release in color led to the widespread adoption of computer coloring in comics and Oliff's work on Akira earned him three consecutive Harvey Awards for Best Colorist (1990–1992) and the first Eisner Award for Best Coloring (1992).

Akira began being published in the American comic book format in the United States in 1988 by Epic Comics, an imprint of Marvel Comics. This colorized version ended its 38-issue run in 1995. Delays in the English publication were caused by Otomo's retouching of artwork for the Japanese collected volumes. It was these collections that formed the basis for translation, rather than the initial magazine serialization. The Epic version suffered significant delays toward the end, requiring several years to publish the final 8 issues. Marvel planned to collect the colorized versions as a 13-volume paperback series, and teamed with Graphitti Designs to release six limited-edition hardcover volumes; however, these ceased in 1993, so the final 3 paperbacks and planned sixth hardcover volume were never published. British publisher Reed began releasing full color versions of the six Akira volumes in 1994. A partially colorized version was serialized in the British comic magazine Manga Mania in the early to mid-decade. A new edition of Akira was published in six paperback volumes from 2000 to 2002 by Dark Horse Comics in North America and Titan Books in the UK. This version is in black-and-white with a revised translation, although Otomo's painted color pages are used minimally at the start of each book as in the original Japanese volumes. In 2003, Tokyopop published the anime comic version in North America.

The English-language rights to Akira are currently held by Kodansha USA, who re-released the manga from 2009 to 2011 through Random House. Kodansha's version is largely identical to the Dark Horse version. In honor of the 35th anniversary of the manga, Kodansha released a box set in late October 2017, containing hardcover editions of all six volumes, as well as the Akira Club art book, and an exclusive patch featuring the iconic pill design. This release was presented in the original right-to-left format, with unaltered original art and Japanese sound effects with endnote translations.

== Volumes ==
No.	Title	Original release date	North American release date
1	Tetsuo (鉄雄)	September 21, 1984; 4-06-103711-0	December 13, 2000; 978-1-56971-498-0 (Dark Horse); October 13, 2009; 978-1-935429-00-5 (Kodansha)
Chapters 1–18, originally serialized from December 1982 to September 1983.
2	Akira I (アキラ I)	September 4, 1985; 4-06-103712-9	March 28, 2001; 978-1-56971-499-7 (Dark Horse); June 22, 2010; 978-1-935429-02-9 (Kodansha)
Chapters 19–33, originally serialized from September 1983 to May 1984.
3	Akira II (アキラ II)	September 1, 1986; 4-06-103713-7	June 27, 2001; 978-1-56971-525-3 (Dark Horse); July 13, 2010; 978-1-935429-04-3 (Kodansha)
Chapters 34–48, originally serialized from May 1984 to January 1985.
4	Kei I (ケイ I)	July 10, 1987; 4-06-103714-5	September 19, 2001; 978-1-56971-526-0 (Dark Horse); November 30, 2010; 978-1-935429-06-7 (Kodansha)
Chapters 49–71, originally serialized from March 1985 to April 1986.
5	Kei II (ケイ II)	December 11, 1990; 4-06-313166-1	December 19, 2001; 978-1-56971-527-7 (Dark Horse); March 1, 2011; 978-1-935429-07-4 (Kodansha)
Chapters 72–96, originally serialized from May 1986 to April 1989
6	Kaneda (金田)	March 23, 1993; 4-06-319339-X	March 27, 2002; 978-1-56971-528-4 (Dark Horse); April 12, 2011; 978-1-935429-08-1 (Kodansha)
Chapters 97–120, originally serialized from May 1989 to June 1990.

== Reception ==
=== Sales and awards ===
The first tankōbon volume, which was released on September 14, 1984, significantly exceeded sales expectations, with its print run increasing from an initial 30,000 copies up to nearly 300,000 copies within two weeks, becoming the number-one best-seller in Japan before eventually selling about 500,000 copies. By 1988, Akira had sold approximately 2 million copies in Japan, from the first four tankōbon volumes averaging about 500,000 copies each. The manga was published in the United States in 1988, followed by Spain in 1990, France and Italy by 1991, and then Germany, Sweden, South Korea, Taiwan, Indonesia, and Brazil thereafter. It was reported by Critique international that by 2000 Akira had sold over 7 million copies worldwide, including at least 2 million in Japan and 5 million overseas via the 38 issues of Epic Comics. By 2005, after the publication of the Dark Horse Comics editions in the original six tankobon volumes, Akira was published in more than a dozen languages worldwide. In 2020, the first volume of Akira became publisher Kodansha's first manga to receive a 100th printing. At a price of ¥1,000 in Japan and $24.95 overseas, the manga tankōbon volumes grossed estimated revenues of ¥2 billion ($16 million) in Japan and $125 million overseas, for an estimated total of $141 million grossed worldwide.

During its run, the seinen manga magazine where it was first serialized, Weekly Young Magazine, experienced an increase in its weekly circulation, from 1 million in 1986 to 1.5 million in 1990. At an average manga magazine price of ¥180 at the time, the 120 issues serializing Akira sold an estimated total of 120–180 million copies and grossed an estimated ¥22–32 billion ($170–250 million).

Akira has won much recognition in the industry, including the 1984 Kodansha Manga Award for Best General Manga. Fans in the United Kingdom voted it Favourite Comic at the 1990 Eagle Awards. It won a Harvey Award for Best American Edition of Foreign Material in 1993, and was nominated for a Harvey for Best Graphic Album of Previously Published Work in 2002. In 2002, Akira won the Eisner Award for Best U.S. Edition of Foreign Material and Best Archival Collection. The 35th anniversary edition won Best Archival Collection/Project-Comic Books again at the 2018 Eisner Awards, in addition to Best Publication Design.

=== Critical reception ===
Akira is credited with having introduced both manga and anime to mainstream Western audiences. According to Kodansha USA's Naho Yamada, "Akira ignited a new generation of dynamism not only in manga but also in European and American comics. Its impact shattered all borders." The Essential Guide to World Comics states that the translation of the work into French in 1991 by Glénat "opened the floodgates to the Japanese invasion." The imagery in Akira, together with that of Blade Runner, formed the blueprint for similar Japanese works of a dystopian nature of the late 1990s, such as Ghost in the Shell and Armitage III. Yamada also said that "Otomo jacked into his generation's frustration with society, in the wake of the defeat of Japan's liberal student movement, and created an epic that, in true Japanese fashion, processed societal trauma through cataclysmic visual symbolism." Writing for The Japan Times, Matt Schley said "For many readers, Akira was a revelation. Each panel features a head-spinning amount of detail, and Otomo, an avowed film buff, keeps things moving at a breathless, cinematic pace." In her book The Fantastic in Japanese Literature, Susan J. Napier described the work as a "no holds barred enjoyment of fluidity and chaos". Akira cemented Otomo's reputation and the success of the animated adaptation allowed him to concentrate on film rather than manga, in which his career began.

Katherine Dacey of MangaBookshelf called Akira one of manga's "greatest sci-fi epics." She also noted how Tetsuo and Kaneda seem like real teenage boys in the manga, not generic action figures like in the film's "grossly" simplified depiction of their relationship. Although stating that Akira's plot was still as topical as ever in the year 2009, Dacey felt that the art had not aged as gracefully.

In his reviews of the first three volumes of Akira, Mark Pellegrini of AIPT Comics strongly praised Otomo's art as "simple, but very lively" and called him a master at drawing architecture. Pellegrini reviewed the series by making many comparisons to the animated film adaptation, calling the characterizations in the manga both "better and on par" with those in it.

Anime News Network had four writers review Kodansha USA's 35th Anniversary box set of Akira. Austin Price and Lynzee Loveridge both gave it a perfect 5 out of 5 rating. Loveridge wrote that "Akira still feels incredibly relevant 35 years later. Giving it a three ½ star rating, Amy McNulty praised Otomo's art and setting. However, she called the characterizations weak and concluded that although Akira "does little to appeal to those who aren't interested in sci-fi, paranormal, or dystopian tales ... manga fans owe it to themselves to at least check it out." Rebecca Silverman gave the series a rating of three out of five, calling Akira a must-read for anyone interested in manga.

== Related media ==
While most of the character designs and basic settings were directly adapted from the original manga, the restructured plot of the movie differs considerably from the print version, changing much of the second half of the series. The film Akira is regarded by many critics as a landmark anime film: one that influenced much of the art in the anime world that followed its release.

A video game, simply titled Akira, based on the animated film was released on December 24, 1988, by Taito for the Famicom console. The player assumes the role of Kaneda, with the storyline starting with Kaneda and his motorcycle gang in police custody. In 1994, a British-made action game was released for the Amiga CD32 and is considered one of the console's worst games. In 2002, Bandai released a pinball simulation titled Akira Psycho Ball for the PlayStation 2.

On June 9, 1995, Kodansha released Akira Club, a compilation of various materials related to the production of the series. These include test designs of the paperback volume covers, title pages as they appeared in Young Magazine, images of various related merchandise, and commentary by Otomo. Dark Horse collaborated with Kodansha to release an English-translated version of the book in 2007.

In 2002, Warner Bros. acquired rights to produce an American live-action film of Akira. Since the initial announcement, a number of directors, producers and writers have been reported to be attached to the film, starting with Stephen Norrington (writer/director) and Jon Peters (producer). By 2017, it was announced that Taika Waititi would officially serve as the director of the live-action adaptation, from a screenplay he co-wrote with Michael Golamco. Warner Bros. planned to release the film on May 21, 2021, but after Waititi was officially confirmed to both direct and write Thor: Love and Thunder, the film was put on hold and removed from the release slot. In June 2025, Warner Bros. Pictures allowed the rights to the live-action film lapse, returning to the Akira manga publisher Kodansha.

On July 4, 2019, Bandai Namco Arts announced a new anime to be made by Sunrise (now a division of Bandai Namco Filmworks).

== Legacy ==
Akira is considered a landmark work in the cyberpunk genre, credited with spawning the Japanese cyberpunk subgenre. It predates the seminal cyberpunk novel Neuromancer (1984), which was released two years after Akira began serialization in 1982 and was not translated into Japanese until 1985. Akira inspired a wave of Japanese science fiction and cyberpunk manga and anime works, including Ghost in the Shell, Battle Angel Alita, Cowboy Bebop, and Serial Experiments Lain. Tetsuo Hara cited Akira as an influence on the dystopian post-apocalyptic setting of his manga Fist of the North Star (1983). Manga artist Tooru Fujisawa, creator of Great Teacher Onizuka, cited Akira as one of his greatest inspirations and said it changed the way he wrote. Naruto creator Masashi Kishimoto has cited both the Akira manga and anime as major influences, particularly as the basis of his own manga career.

In the 1998 film Dark City, one of the last scenes, in which buildings "restore" themselves, is similar to the last panel of the Akira manga. Its writer-director Alex Proyas called the end battle a "homage to Otomo's Akira". Director Josh Trank cited Akira as an influence on the 2012 film Chronicle. Rapper Lupe Fiasco's 2015 album Tetsuo & Youth was loosely inspired by the Akira character Tetsuo Shima.

In the original plans for the 2020 Tokyo Olympics and Paralympics Opening Ceremony, Akira was to be featured in order to appeal to Japan's "soft power" among youth. The original plans featured Kaneda riding into the stadium on his motorcycle. As Japan scholar Tagsold notes, there is an inherent irony in the use of Akira to promote the 2020 Olympics. The original manga (and to a lesser extent the film) contains strong anti-Olympic sentiment and contains several references to the 1964 Olympics, and in the story the Olympics are also scheduled to be held in Tokyo in 2020, where they are to symbolize Japan's rebirth and recovery from a nuclear disaster that takes place in the 1980s in the story setting (the dates differ between the manga and the film). Tagsold notes, "By referencing the 1964 Games, Ōtomo paints a highly critical image of the first Tokyo Olympics, reflecting the mood of the early 1980s, when citizens vehemently opposed plans to host the Olympics in Nagoya." Nonetheless, the original plans also included Ōtomo creating an illustration for the ceremony, indicative of his own complex perspective on what the Olympics meant for Japan. Ultimately, the irony of an anti-Olympic story being used to promote the Olympics was avoided when the Olympics themselves were postponed due to the COVID-19 pandemic, and the original production team was replaced.
