= James O'Barr =

American graphic and comics artist

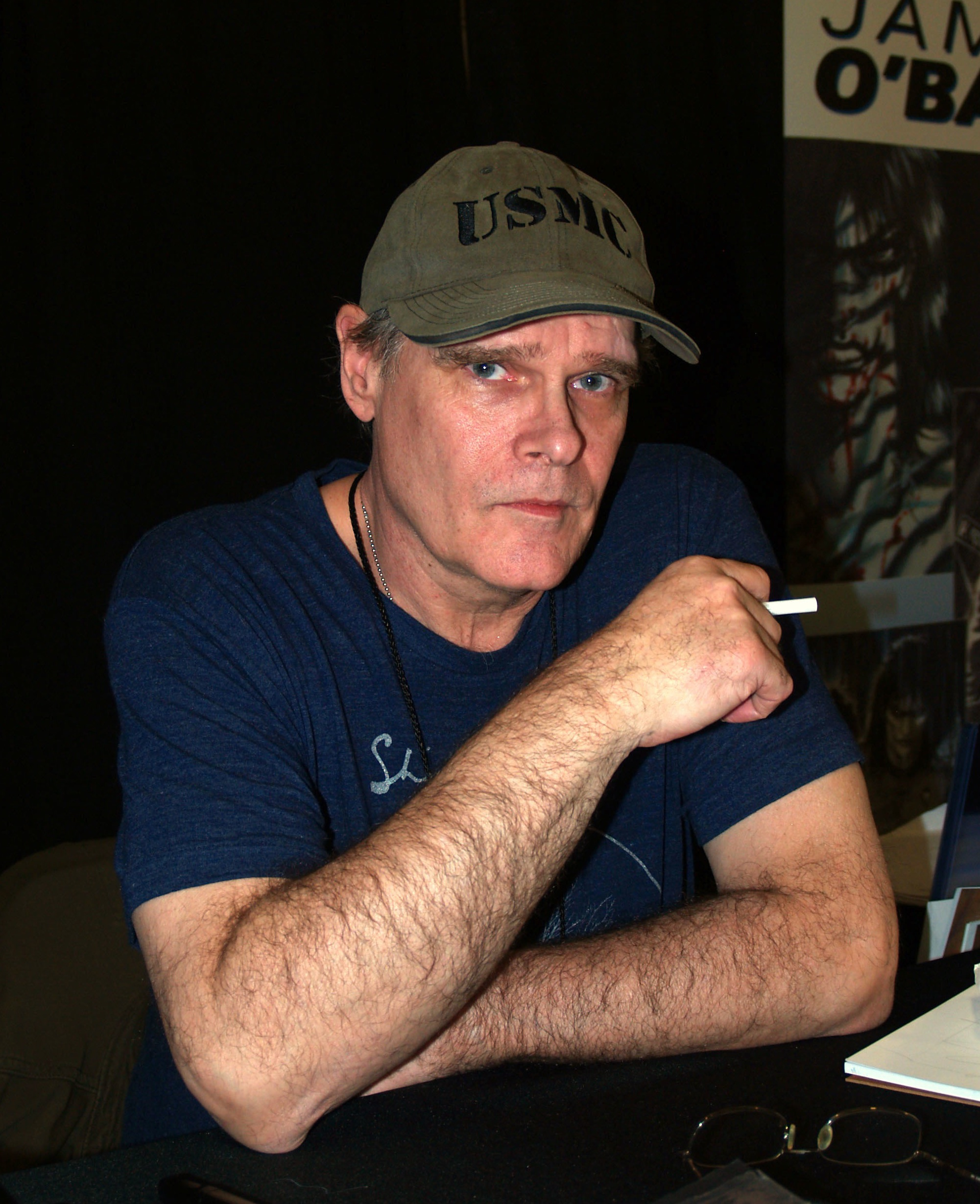
- O'Barr in April 2016
- Born: January 1, 1960 (age 66) Detroit, Michigan, U.S.
- Areas: Writer, Artist
- Notable works: The Crow
- Children: 2

James O'Barr (born January 1, 1960) is an American comics artist, writer and graphic artist, known for his creator-owned comics series The Crow.

== Early life ==
O'Barr, an orphan, was raised in the foster care system.

== Career ==
At 18, O'Barr enlisted in the Marines. While stationed in West Germany, he illustrated combat manuals for the U.S. military.

Before he joined the Marines, O'Barr's fiancée, Beverly, had been killed by a drunk driver. Part of the reason O'Barr joined the military was the hope that service would help him cope with his grief. While living in West Berlin in 1981, O'Barr began to work on his comic, The Crow, as a means of dealing with his personal tragedy. O'Barr was further inspired by a Detroit newspaper account of the murder of a young couple over a $20 engagement ring. In The Crow, the protagonist, Eric, and his fiancée, Shelly, are murdered by a gang of criminals. Eric then returns from the dead, guided by a supernatural crow, to hunt their killers.

After his discharge from the Marines, O'Barr returned to Detroit, where he continued to paint and illustrate while working a day job at an auto body shop. The Crow was eventually published in association with Gary Reed of Caliber Press. The first miniseries was published in 1989. The Crow has since sold more than 750,000 copies worldwide.

O'Barr's own hope that his project would result in a personal catharsis went unfulfilled. During an interview in 1994, he said, "[A]s I drew each page, it made me more self-destructive, if anything... There is pure anger on each page".

In the 1990s, O'Barr was affiliated with the industrial band Trust Obey, which was signed briefly to Trent Reznor's Nothing label. Trust Obey released the album Fear and Bullets: Music to Accompany The Crow in 1993. The album was packaged with a special edition of The Crow graphic novel.

The Crow was adapted into a successful film of the same name in 1994, which was marred by the tragic death of its star, Brandon Lee, who was also engaged to be married, during filming. The film went on to spawn three sequels and a television series.

After the success of The Crow film, O'Barr began planning an apocalyptic graphic novel series entitled Gothik. The series was based on The Wizard of Oz and featured "Jonny Z" from his short story "Frame 137" as the main character.

In January 2013, Motionworks Entertainment released O'Barr's western comic, Sundown, which served as their debut motion comic for iPhone and iPad. He also announced his work on a comic about the Korean War, centered on the efforts of three U.S. Marine guncrews to hold Fox Hill during the Battle of Chosin Reservoir, with a different artist drawing each gun crew.

In 2013, O'Barr was named as a consultant on a possible reboot of The Crow film franchise. Although previously opposed to the project, in an October 2014 interview, speaking of his involvement, O'Barr discussed the approach to the adaptation and efforts being made to respect the original film. Later, in November 2014, O'Barr appeared at the Wizard World Tulsa Comic Con and stated that he was co-writing the script with screenwriter Cliff Dorfman. After a long period in development hell, a reboot film would be released in 2024 starring Bill Skarsgård, though O'Barr is only credited in reference to the original comic.

== Personal life ==
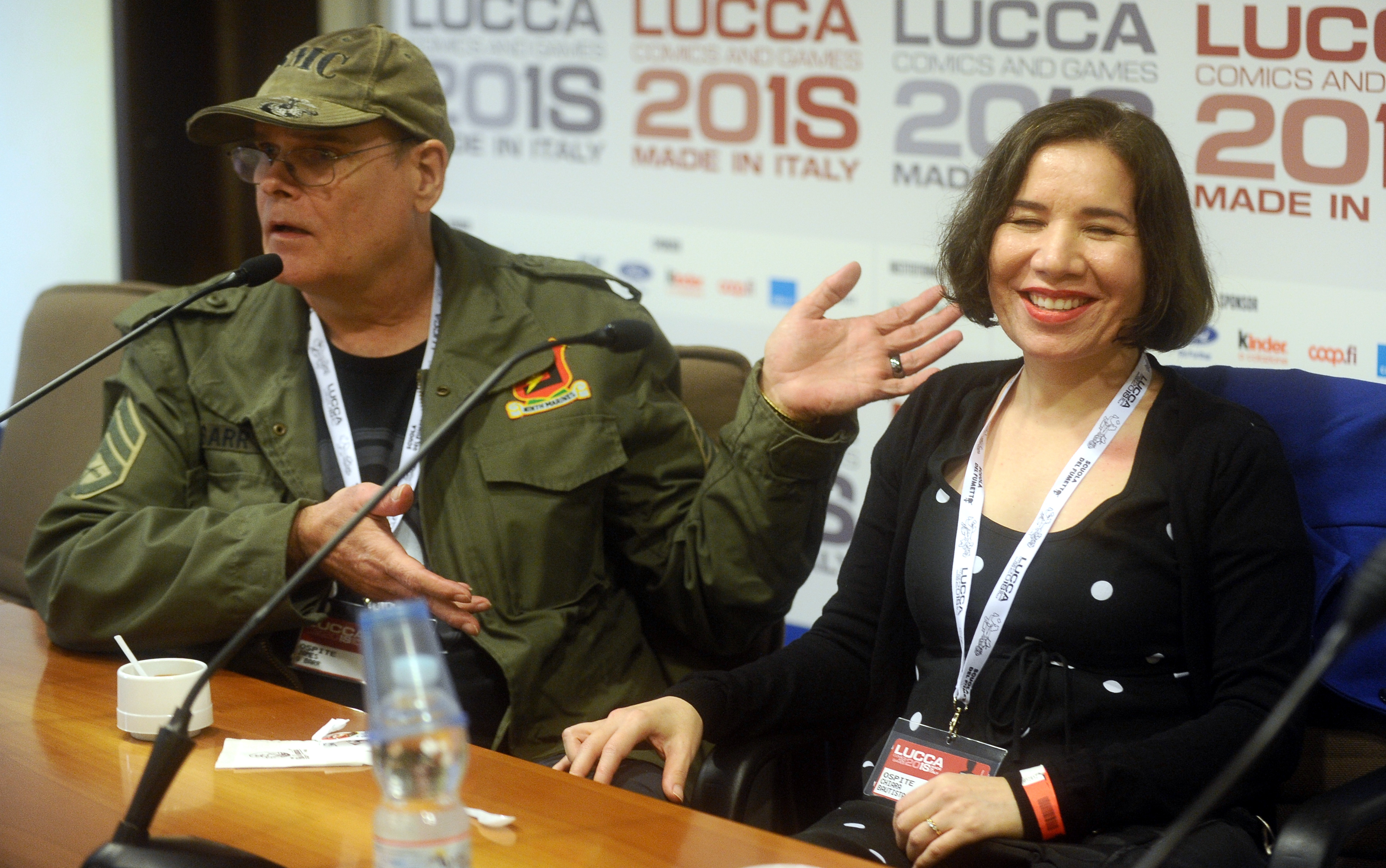
James O'Barr and Chiara Bautista at Lucca Comics & Games 2018

As of the mid-2000s, O'Barr resided in Dallas.

== Bibliography ==
Title	Credits	Publisher	Date	Item type
Amazing Heroes Swimsuit Special #1	Pin-up: The Crow	Fantagraphics Books	1990-06	Comic Book
Andi: Sibling #1	Back Cover	Sabre's Edge	2001	Comic Book
Anodyne	Cover, 5 plates (The Crow)	Blue Monkey Graphics	2005	Portfolio
Ashes #4	"Angelman" 15 pp. (inspired by, w/ John Bergin), "Wasp Baby (Morphine Dream #16)" 4 pp. (w/ John Bergin)	Caliber Press	1990-08	Comic Book
Ashes #5	"Coyote" 12 pp. (w/ John Bergin)	Caliber Press	1990-10	Comic Book
Beat to a Pulp: Round 1	Cover	Beat to a Pulp	2010-10	Book (SC)
Best of Northstar #1	"Zeitgeist" preview 3 pp.	Northstar/Arpad Publishing	1992-08	Comic Book
Black Dominion Vol. 1	Pin-up: Krishna and Vox (Zeitgeist)	Anubis Press	1993-07	Comic Book
Black Dominion Vol. 1 (Limited Edition)	Pin-up: Krishna and Vox (Zeitgeist)	Anubis Press	1993-07	Comic Book
Black Feathers by The Mag Seven	Cover	End Sounds	2010-11	Album
Bone Saw #1	Editor (w/ John Bergin), "Slave Cylinder" 32 pp. (w/ Carolyn Bergin and Jeff Holland), "German Film, Blurred" 1 p. (w/ John Bergin), "Recoil (Morphine Dream #21)" 2 pp. (w/ John Bergin)	Tundra Publishing	1992	Original Comic Anthology (SC)
Book of Deady	Reprints "Here, Kitty Kitty" from Deady the Terrible Teddy Vol. 2	Sirius Entertainment	2006-03	Collected Ed. (SC)
Caliber Christmas, A #1	Cover, "Atmosphere (The Crow)" 6 pp.	Caliber Press	1989-12	Comic Book
Caliber Presents # 1	Back Cover, "Inertia (The Crow)" 8 pp., "Io, Part 1: Silo" 12 pp. (as Barbed Wire Halo Studios)	Caliber Press	1989-01	Comic Book
Caliber Presents # 2	Cover, "Skinner (Gideon's)" 8 pp. (ill. only, w/ Gary Reed (as Kyle Garrett))	Caliber Press	1989-03	Comic Book
Caliber Presents # 3	Cover (as Barbed Wire Halo Studios), "Io, Part 2: Fleshette" 8 pp. (as Barbed Wire Halo Studios)	Caliber Press	1989-05	Comic Book
Caliber Presents # 5	Cover, "Old World" 6 pp. (ill. only, w/ Mark C. Perry and Guy Davis)	Caliber Press	1989-07	Comic Book
Caliber Presents #15	Sketchbook 8 pp., The Crow #5 preview 9 pp.	Caliber Press	1990-09	Comic Book
Choke Vol. 2	Cover (w/ James Widmark), Reprints "Wasp Baby" from Ashes #4	Anubis Press	1993-08	Comic Book
Choke Vol. 2 (Limited Edition)	Reprints "Wasp Baby" from Ashes #4	Anubis Press	1993-08	Comic Book
Cobalt 60 Book 3	Pin-up: Cobalt 60	Tundra Publishing	1992-05	Magazine
Comic Shop News 1990 Winter Preview	Cover	Comic Shop News	1990	Newsletter
Crow – Special Edition, The	Cover, Reprints The Crow #1–4, The Crow Vol. 3, "Inertia" from Caliber Presents #1, "Atmosphere" from A Caliber Christmas, plus additional material. (Note: Revised and expanded, including 30 all-new pages and a new introduction by the author)	Gallery Books	2011	Collected Ed. (SC)
Crow, The	Cover, Back Cover, Reprints The Crow #1–4, The Crow Vol. 3, "Inertia" from Caliber Presents #1, "Atmosphere" from A Caliber Christmas, plus additional material. (Note: 1,500 S&N copies, some with Slipcase & CD)	Graphitti Designs	1993	Collected Ed. (HC)
Crow, The	Cover, Back Cover, Reprints The Crow #1–4, The Crow Vol. 3, "Inertia" from Caliber Presents #1, "Atmosphere" from A Caliber Christmas, plus additional material.	Kitchen Sink Press	1993	Collected Ed. (SC)
Crow, The	Cover, Back Cover, Reprints The Crow #1–4, The Crow Vol. 3, "Inertia" from Caliber Presents #1, "Atmosphere" from A Caliber Christmas, plus additional material. (Note: Later printing of the Kitchen Sink Press collected edition, but with the tagline "Now A Major Motion Picture" added to the cover)	Kitchen Sink Press	1994	Collected Ed. (SC)
Crow, The	Cover, Back Cover, Reprints The Crow #1–4, The Crow Vol. 3, "Inertia" from Caliber Presents #1, "Atmosphere" from A Caliber Christmas, plus additional material.	Pocket Books	2002	Collected Ed. (SC)
Crow, The #0: A Cycle of Shattered Lives	Cover, "The Crow" 6 pp., "October- The Breath of God: Crow II" 2 pp., "Shadowplay" 1 p., "She Smiles in Pain and Glory" 1 p., "Spine of the Snake" 1 p., "Three Dreams from The Book of Dreams" 3 pp.	Kitchen Sink Press	1998-12	Comic Book
Crow, The #1	Cover, "Pain" 32 pp.	Caliber Press	1989-02	Comic Book
Crow, The #2	Cover, "Fear" 32 pp.	Caliber Press	1989-03	Comic Book
Crow, The #3	Cover, "Irony" 32 pp.	Caliber Press	1989-08	Comic Book
Crow, The #4	Cover, "Despair" 32 pp.	Caliber Press	1989	Comic Book
Crow, The Vol. 1: Pain & Fear	Cover, Back Cover, Reprints The Crow #1–2	Tundra Publishing	1992-01	Comic Book
Crow, The Vol. 2: Irony & Despair	Cover, Back Cover, Reprints The Crow #3–4	Tundra Publishing	1992-03	Comic Book
Crow, The Vol. 3: Death	Cover, Back Cover, "Death" 64 pp. (Note: Would have been The Crow #5 if published by Caliber)	Tundra Publishing	1992-05	Comic Book
Crow: Dead Time, The	Back Cover, Story, Reprints The Crow: Dead Time 1–3	Kitchen Sink Press/Top Dollar Comics	1997-01	Collected Ed. (SC)
Crow: Dead Time, The #1	Cover, Story	Kitchen Sink Press/Top Dollar Comics	1996-01	Comic Book
Crow: Dead Time, The #2	Cover, Story	Kitchen Sink Press/Top Dollar Comics	1996-02	Comic Book
Crow: Dead Time, The #3	Cover, Story	Kitchen Sink Press/Top Dollar Comics	1996-03	Comic Book
Crow: Flesh & Blood, The	Back Cover, Reprints The Crow: Flesh & Blood 1–3	Kitchen Sink Press/Top Dollar Comics	1998-02	Collected Ed. (SC)
Crow: Flesh & Blood, The	B&W reprints of original covers, Reprints The Crow: Flesh & Blood 1–3	Dark Horse Comics	2004	Collected Ed. (SC)
Crow: Flesh & Blood, The #1	Cover	Kitchen Sink Press/Top Dollar Comics	1996-05	Comic Book
Crow: Flesh & Blood, The #2	Cover	Kitchen Sink Press/Top Dollar Comics	1996-06	Comic Book
Crow: Flesh & Blood, The #3	Cover	Kitchen Sink Press/Top Dollar Comics	1996-07	Comic Book
Crow Magazine, The #1	Interview 3 pp.	Todd McFarlane Productions/Top Dollar Comics	2000-03	Magazine
Crow Portfolio, The	Cover, 6 plates (Note: 2,500 S&N copies)	Tundra Publishing	1993	Portfolio
Crow/Razor: Kill the Pain, The #1	Cover	London Night Studios/Top Dollar Comics	1998-04	Comic Book
Crow/Razor: Kill the Pain, The #2	Cover	London Night Studios/Top Dollar Comics	1998-05	Comic Book
Crow/Razor: Kill the Pain, The #3	Cover	London Night Studios/Top Dollar Comics	1998-07	Comic Book
Crow/Razor: Nocturnal Masque, The	B&W reprints of original covers	London Night Studios/Top Dollar Comics	1999-02	Magazine
Crow: Shattered Lives and Broken Dreams, The	Cover, Editor (w/ Ed Kramer), "Spooky, Codeine and the Dead Man" 8 pp., "The Real Thing" 8 pp. (ill. only, w/ Andrew Vachss), "Jesus Christ's Wrists" 1 p., "Hellbent" 20 pp. (ill. only, w/ A. A. Attanasio), "Darkness and the Shadow of Light" 2 pp.	Del Rey	1998-12	Book (HC)
Crow: Shattered Lives and Broken Dreams, The	Cover, Editor (w/ Ed Kramer), "Spooky, Codeine and the Dead Man" 8 pp., "Shuttlecock" 30 pp. (ill. only, w/ Edward Bryant), "Jesus Christ's Wrists" 1 p., "Hellbent" 20 pp. (ill. only, w/ A. A. Attanasio), "Darkness and the Shadow of Light" 2 pp.	Del Rey	1999-10	Book (SC)
Crow: Shattered Lives and Broken Dreams, The	Cover, Editor (w/ Ed Kramer), "Spooky, Codeine and the Dead Man" 8 pp., "Shuttlecock" 30 pp. (ill. only, w/ Edward Bryant), "Jesus Christ's Wrists" 1 p., "Hellbent" 20 pp. (ill. only, w/ A. A. Attanasio), "Darkness and the Shadow of Light" 2 pp. (Note: 1,500 S&N copies, 39 signatures, 55 ill., traycase)	Donald M. Grant	2001-02	Book (HC)
Cybernetic Liberation Front #1	Cover	Anubis Press	1993	Comic Book
Dante's Disciples	Introduction	White Wolf Publishing	1996-08	Book (SC)
Dante's Disciples	Introduction	White Wolf Publishing	1998-09	Book (SC-MM)
Dark Angel #20 (Alternate Cover)	Cover	CPM Manga	2000	Comic Book
Dark Fantasies #3	Cover	Dark Fantasy Productions	1994	Comic Book
Dark Fantasies #3 (Red foil)	Cover	Dark Fantasy Productions	1994	Comic Book
Dark Horse Presents #61	"Frame 137 (Gothik)" 4 pp.	Dark Horse Comics	1992-04	Comic Book
Dead Boys #1	Cover	London Night Studios	1993	Comic Book
Dead Boys #1 (Gold)	Cover	London Night Studios	1993	Comic Book
Dead Boys #1 (Silver)	Cover	London Night Studios	1993	Comic Book
Deadworld Vol. 1, #10 (Graphic)	Back Cover, "Give 'Em Enough Rope" 16 pp. (inks only (as Jonny Zero) w/ Jack Herman and Vince Locke)	Caliber Press	1988-11	Comic Book
Deadworld Vol. 1, #10 (Tame)	Cover (as Jonny Zero), Back Cover, "Give 'Em Enough Rope" 16 pp. (inks only (as Jonny Zero) w/ Jack Herman and Vince Locke)	Caliber Press	1988-11	Comic Book
Deadworld Vol. 1, #11 (Tame)	Cover (as Jonny Zero)	Caliber Press	1989-04	Comic Book
Deadworld Vol. 1, #12 (Tame)	Cover (as Jonny Zero)	Caliber Press	1989-06	Comic Book
Deadworld Vol. 1, #13 (Tame)	Cover	Caliber Press	1989-07	Comic Book
Deadworld Vol. 1, #14 (Tame)	Wraparound Cover	Caliber Press	1990-03	Comic Book
Deadworld Vol. 1, #16 (Tame)	Cover	Caliber Press	1990	Comic Book
Deadworld Vol. 1, #17 (Tame)	Cover	Caliber Press	1990	Comic Book
Deadworld Classic Vol. 2	B&W reprints of original covers, Reprints "Give 'Em Enough Rope" from Deadworld #10	Desperado/IDW	2011-07	Collected Ed. (SC)
Deady the Terrible Teddy Vol. 2	"Here, Kitty Kitty (The Crow)" 3 pp. (w/ Voltaire)	Sirius Entertainment	2004-12	Comic Book
Death Rattle Vol. 3, #2	"The Crow: Dead Time" preview 4 pp.	Kitchen Sink Press	1995-12	Comic Book
Death Rattle Vol. 3, #3	Cover, "The Crow: Lost Pages" 8 pp.	Kitchen Sink Press	1996-02	Comic Book
Freaks Amour #2	Cover	Dark Horse Comics	1992-09	Comic Book
French Crow, The	Cover (Note: French language)	Goutte d'Or Productions	2002	Original Comic Anthology (SC)
Fugitive #1	"Where No Madman Has Gone Before" 13 pp. (ill. only, w/ Charles Marshall and Guy Davis)	Caliber Press	1989-10	Comic Book
Gasm #4	"Incident on Planetoid 7" 9 pp. (as Zen)	Stories, Layout & Press	1978-04	Magazine
Godhead Vol. 2	Cover (w/ James Widmark)	Anubis Press	1993-03	Comic Book
Harbonah	Card art	Last Unicorn Games	1995	Card from Heresy: Kingdom Come
Hard Looks #3	Cover, "Any Time I Want" 14 pp. (ill. and letters, w/ Jerry Prosser and Andrew Vachss)	Dark Horse Comics	1992-07	Comic Book
Hard Looks #9	"Joy Ride" 7 pp. (ill. and letters, w/ Neal Barrett, Jr. and Andrew Vachss)	Dark Horse Comics	1993-07	Comic Book
Hard Looks: Adapted Stories Vol. 1	Reprints "Any Time I Want" from Hard Looks #3	Dark Horse Comics	1994	Collected Ed. (SC)
Hard Looks: Adapted Stories (2nd Edition)	Reprints "Any Time I Want" from Hard Looks #3 and "Joy Ride" from Hard Looks #9	Dark Horse Comics	1996-09	Collected Ed. (SC)
Harpy Pin-Up Special #1	Cover	Peregrine Entertainment	1998-04	Comic Book
Heavy Metal Sept.1993	Crow gallery 4 pp.	Metal Mammoth	1993-09	Magazine
Horror: The Illustrated Book of Fears #2	"Blood Rape of the Lust Ghouls" 16 pgs (w/ David J. Schow)	Northstar Publishing	1990-02	Magazine
Independent Voices #3	Wraparound Cover (w/ Joseph Michael Linsner)	Peregrine Entertainment	2001-08	Comic Book
Io Book 0	Reprints "Io, Part 1: Silo" from Caliber Presents #1 and "Io, Part 2: Fleshette" from Caliber Presents #3 (Note: Restored by John Bergin, including new color and textures, framing pages and cover)	Negative Comics	2011-12	Comic Book
James O'Barr: Savages #1	Cover, Back cover, Image gallery 12 pp., Sketch gallery 15 pp., Reprints "Shadows" from Tasty Bits #1 (here retitled "Shadows Smile")	Peregrine Entertainment	2001-09	Comic Book
James O'Barr's Art Cards	10 card set	Crow Fan Club/Strictly Ink	2003	Trading Cards
James O'Barr's Audio Commentary of "The Crow" starring Brandon Lee	Cover, Audio commentary	Crow Fan Club	2003	Audio (2-CD Set)
James O'Barr's Audio Commentary of "The Crow" starring Brandon Lee (Pre-Order Edition)	Cover, Audio commentary (Note: 20 S&N copies w/ original art)	Crow Fan Club	2003	Audio (2-CD Set)
James O'Barr's Sketchbook #1: The Crow	Cover, Back Cover, Pin-up/Sketch gallery 24 pp.	Blue Monkey Graphics	2004	Sketchbook
James O'Barr's Sketchbook #2: Women	Wraparound Cover, Pin-up/Sketch gallery 24 pp.	Blue Monkey Graphics	2004	Sketchbook
James O'Barr's Sketchbook #3	Wraparound Cover, Pin-up/Sketch gallery 20 pp. (Note: 50 S&N copies)	Blue Monkey Graphics	2004-09	Sketchbook
Kabuki Images	Pin-up: Kabuki	Image Comics	1998-06	Comic Book
Life and Death in Black, White and Blue: Poems and Stories	Cover	PublishAmerica	2006-04	Book (SC)
Motor City Comic Con Fall '02	Cover	Motor City Conventions	2002-10	Program Guide
Monster Massacre	Pin-up: The Reptile House (Gothik)	Atomeka Press	1993	Comic Book
Monster Massacre (Silver Edition)	Pin-up: The Reptile House (Gothik)	Atomeka Press	1993	Comic Book
Monster Massacre Special #1	"Snake Dance (Gothik)" 14 pp. (w/ John Bergin)	Blackball Comics	1993	Comic Book
Naiades by Monica Richards	Painting (in album booklet)	Elyrian Music/BMI	2012	Album
Necromancer #2	Back Cover	Anarchy Press	1993	Comic Book
Necromancer #2 (Ashcan)	Cover	Anarchy Press	1993	Comic Book
Northstar 5th Anniversary Special #1	Pin-Up: Zeitgeist	Northstar/Arpad Publishing	1995-03	Comic Book
Northstar Presents #1: James O'Barr	Cover, Reprints "Zeitgeist, Part One" from Slash #2 and "Blood Rape of the Lust Ghouls" from Horror: The Illustrated Book of Fears #2	Northstar/Arpad Publishing	1994-10	Comic Book
Northstar Presents #1: James O'Barr (Gold Edition)	Cover, Reprints "Zeitgeist, Part One" from Slash #2 and "Blood Rape of the Lust Ghouls" from Horror: The Illustrated Book of Fears #2	Northstar/Arpad Publishing	1995-04	Comic Book
Original Sins #1	Cover, Crow gallery 7 pp., Reprints "Io, Part 1: Silo" from Caliber Presents #1 and "Io, Part 2: Fleshette" from Caliber Presents #3	ACG/Avalon Communications	1999	Comic Book
Pink Dust: Morphine Dreams	Cover, Back Cover, "Pink Dust on a Yellow Moon (Morphine Dream #39)" 14 pp., "Wages of Sin" 6 pp., Reprints B&W version of "Slave Cylinder" from Bone Saw #1	Kitchen Sink Press	1998-08	Comic Book
Razor #2	Cover	London Night Studios	1993-02	Comic Book
Razor: Tour of Fear #2	Back Cover	London Night Studios	1993	Comic Book
Realm, The #20	Jam Cover (w/ 24 other artists)	Caliber Press	1990-12	Comic Book
Ride: Inertia's Kiss Sketchbook, The	Cover, Back Cover (photos), "History of a Gearhead" 3 pp., Sketch gallery 21 pp., Reprints "Slave Cylinder" from Bone Saw #1 (3 pp. only) and "G" Forces" from Savage Tales #4	12 Gauge Comics	2006	Comic Book
San Diego Comic Con Comics #2	Pin-up: Gothik	Dark Horse Comics	1993	Comic Book
Savage Tales Vol. 2, #4	"G" Forces" 4 pp.	Marvel Comics	1986-04	Magazine
Slash #1	Cover, "Zeitgeist" preview 2 pp., Reprints "Blood Rape of the Lust Ghouls" from Horror: The Illustrated Book of Fears #2	Northstar/Arpad Publishing	1992-08	Comic Book
Slash #1 (2nd print, Red foil)	Cover, Back Cover, Reprints "Blood Rape of the Lust Ghouls" from Horror: The Illustrated Book of Fears #2	Northstar/Arpad Publishing	1993-08	Comic Book
Slash #2	Cover, "Zeitgeist, Part One" 8 pp.	Northstar/Arpad Publishing	1992-11	Comic Book
Slash #3	Cover	Northstar/Arpad Publishing	1993-02	Comic Book
Sundown	"Sundown" preview 2:20	Motionworks Entertainment	2011	Digital Motion Comic
Tasty Bits #1	Cover, "Shadows" 5 pp., "Upon Thy Belly Thou Shalt Go..." 2 pp. (as Zen), Pin-up gallery 14 pp., Reprints "Frame 137" from Dark Horse Presents #61	ACG/Avalon Communications	1999	Comic Book
Terra X #1	Cover, Interview 3 pp.	Insta-Graphics	1991	Magazine
Vesper #1A	Cover, Back Cover (w/ Hannibal King)	Acetylene Comics	2001	Comic Book
Vesper #2A	Cover, Pin-up: Vesper (B&W version of cover)	Acetylene Comics	2001	Comic Book
Visions: From the Mind of James O'Barr	Cover, Sketch gallery 20 pp. (Note: included exclusively with The Crow: The Complete Interactive Collection CD-Rom)	Content, Inc.	1996	Sketchbook
The Crow – Skinning the Wolves	Story	IDW Publishing	2012	Comic Book
The Crow – Curare	Story	IDW Publishing	2013	Comic Book
