= Akira Psycho Ball =

2002 video game

- Developer: KAZe
- Publisher: Bandai
- Composer: Yusuke Takahama
- Platform: PlayStation 2
- Release: JP: February 21, 2002; EU: June 2002
- Genre: Pinball
- Modes: Single-player, multiplayer

Akira Psycho Ball (アキラ・サイコ・ボール, Akira Saiko Bōru) is a 2002 digital pinball game based on the popular Akira series created by Katsuhiro Otomo. It features the original storyline and a soundtrack inspired by that of the film. It features clips from the film and four tables based on the locations from the film.

The game was released on the Japanese market to coincide with the release of the newly remastered DVD Japanese edition.

In 2003, the game was translated by Bandai's European division, and distributed in Europe by Infogrames. The game was scheluded to be released in the United States but the release was put on "indefinite hold".

== Fields ==
The pinball is made of four stages inspired by the movie: Neo Tokyo battlefield, the "A-room", the "Olympic Stadium" and the "Laboratory" transformation.

When the player succeeds, like getting an extra ball or clearing a stage, a short clip taken from the movie is displayed on screen.

== Reception ==
Reception

Review scores
Publication	Score
4Players	61/100
Famitsu	9/10, 8/10, 7/10, 7/10
Evolution	7/10
MAN!AC	64/100
PlayStation 2 Official Magazine – Australia	5/10
PSM2	47/100
PSX Extreme	7-/10

Akira Psycho Ball was released in Japan for the PlayStation 2 on February 21, 2002.

4Players said that the graphics and gameplay are average and the game's only appeal is the low price. MAN!AC liked the ball physics but criticized the high difficulty level in the story mode and the table layouts for their lack of action.
