= Trust Obey =

American band

- Origin: Kansas City, Missouri, United States
- Genres: Industrial; dark wave
- Years active: 1989 –
- Labels: Deezal; Grinder Books and Recordings; Fifth Colvmn; Grinder Tool & Die; Invisible; Malignant
- Past members: John Bergin; Brett Smith
- Website: stompbox13.com

Trust Obey was an American band based in Kansas City, Missouri and founded by John Bergin and Brett Smith, who comprised the creative nucleus of the group. They released six studio albums: Rip Saw (1989), The Veil (1990), Locust (1990), Exit Wound (1991), Fear and Bullets (1994) and Hands of Ash (1996).

== History ==
Trust Obey was formed by vocalist and programmer John Bergin and guitarist Brett Smith. He had originally composer under the moniker Orifice, which he founded in 1985. The band debuted with the studio album Rip Saw in 1989. Two albums followed in 1990, were self-released and titled The Veil and Locust. The band's fourth album Exit Wound was released in 1991. After three years Bergin returned with a collaboration with graphic novelist James O'Barr, a soundtrack to O'Barr's graphic novel The Crow titled Fear and Bullets, released by Graphitti Designs. In 1996 the band released their sixth studio album titled Hands of Ash for Fifth Colvmn Records. The album was commended by critics for its gothic undertones and high production quality.

== Discography ==
Studio albums

- Rip Saw (1989)
- The Veil (1990)
- Locust (1990)
- Exit Wound (1991)
- Hands of Ash (1996, Fifth Colvmn)
- Audio Asphyxiation: The John Bergin Special (1996, Grinder Books and Recordings)

Soundtrack albums

- Fear and Bullets (1994, Graphitti Designs)
- Fear and Bullets (1991 Demo) (2018)

Extended plays

- Fear and Bullets: Seven Blackbirds (2018)
- Fear and Bullets: The Tides of Sin (2018)

Compilation albums

- Sanctity Now (1991 Demo) (2018)

Compilation appearances

- Le Bruit Pour La Raison Qui S'y Trouve (1991, Ensemble Vide)
- Sever Motor Discordia (1992, Technical Chaos)
- Terra X: Vol. 1 Love and Hate (1993, Terra X)
- Kansas City Misery (1995, Red Decibel)
- Fascist Communist Revolutionaries (1996, Fifth Colvmn)
- World War Underground (1997, Fifth Colvmn)
- Wish You Were Queer: A Tribute to Ministry (1999, Invisible)
- Nod's Tacklebox O' Fun (1999, Re-Constriction)
- An Industrial Tribute To: Ministry (2003, Tributized)
- Tributaeminesteriumni - Two CD Tribute Set (2004, Underground, Inc.)
