= Akira (video game) =

1988 adventure video game

- Family Computer cover art
- Developer: TOSE
- Publisher: Taito
- Composer: Toshiko Kawanishi
- Platform: Family Computer
- Release: JP: December 24, 1988
- Genre: Adventure
- Mode: Single-player

Akira (アキラ) is a 1988 adventure video game by TOSE for the Family Computer console exclusively in Japan. It is based on Akira, the 1988 animated film version of Katsuhiro Otomo's manga of the same name.

== Plot ==
The player takes the role of Kaneda, who begins the game when his motorcycle gang is taken into police custody after the abduction of their friend Tetsuo by the military.

== Gameplay ==
Progress in the game is made by selecting actions from a list. The current location is depicted in a static image, often redrawn from the film. Progress can be recorded with the help of passwords.

== Development ==
The game was developed by TOSE and published by Taito. In 2012, a fan translation into English was created.

== Release ==
The game was released in Japan on December 24, 1988. It was released only 5 months after the film. The release coincided with the height of the popularity of the Akira series.

== Reception ==
Akira was given a poor total score of 17 out of 40 from the panel of four reviewers of Famicom Tsūshin magazine.

== See also ==
- List of Family Computer games
