= Thomas Woodruff (artist) =

American artist

Crying Clown – Violet by Thomas Woodruff, 1990, Honolulu Museum of Art

Thomas Woodruff (born 1957) is a New York based artist who was born in New Rochelle, New York. He received a BFA from Cooper Union in 1979. He taught at the School of Visual Arts in New York City for 39 years, and was Chair of the BFA Illustration and Cartooning Department for 20 years, stepping down as Chair Emeritus in 2021. T: The New York Times Style Magazine praised Woodruff for "diversifying the curriculum" during is tenure at SVA.

Much of the artist's output is in series. Crying Clown, in the collection of the Honolulu Museum of Art, is from the Chromatic Aberration series. It is an overly sentimentalized self-portrait painted in the early years of the AIDS epidemic, showing Woodruff’s feelings of anger and loss. The Art Gallery of Western Australia, the Brooklyn Museum, the Greenville County Museum of Art (Greenville, South Carolina), the Honolulu Museum of Art, the New Orleans Museum of Art are among the public collections holding work by Woodruff. In 2022 he had an exhibition entitled Resurrection at the Vito Schnabel Gallery that was hailed as a "luminous show" by The Brooklyn Rail.

In 2023, Woodruff's work Francis Rothbart! The Tale of a Fastidious Feral, published by Fantagraphics was called "the Sistine Chapel of graphic novels" by Steven Heller in an article in Print Magazine and praised as the "gorgeous" for being "Hand-lettered with lush color paintings and moody charcoal drawings" by The A.V. Club. The book was nominated for four Eisner Awards in the categories Best Graphic Album (New), Best Painter/Multimedia Artist, Best Lettering, and Best Publication Design. The nominations prompted criticism by former students, who described him as an emotionally abusive teacher, and the book as culturally appropriative. Woodruff initially responded in a statement provided by Fantagraphics that his "frank critiques" of his students "were intended to help them develop keen minds and strong spines," and to criticism of the book that "Artists must be brave, particularly telling the stories that they need to tell." He declined the nominations a week later.
