= Fear and Bullets =

Soundtrack album by Trust Obey
- Released: 1994, re-released in 1998
- Genre: Industrial
- Label: Nothing
- Producers: John Bergin, James O'Barr

John Bergin chronology
Trinity (1992)	Fear and Bullets (1994)	He Swallows the Ground (1994)

Fear and Bullets is a soundtrack album by Trust Obey created through a collaboration between James O'Barr and longtime friend John Bergin as a soundtrack to O'Barr's graphic novel The Crow. It was originally released in 1994 along with a limited edition hardcover copy of the graphic novel. The release also coincided with the publicity received by the film. In 1998, Fear and Bullets was re-released with a new cover, almost all the songs completely re-recorded or remixed, and the addition of two new tracks (but other two were removed). The release included previously unreleased drawings by O'Barr.

== Track listings ==
=== 1994 version ===
1. Fear and Bullets - 6:36
2. C17H19NO3 - 1:54
3. The Tides of Sin - 9:21
4. Don't Look - 3:14
5. Lead Poisoning - 5:57
6. Seven Blackbirds - 10:40
7. True Love Always - 4:19
8. Sleeping Angel - 6:44
9. The Blessing of the Pig - 11:44
10. The Crow - 7:54
11. Forever, Now - 3:42

=== 1998 version ===
1. Lead Poisoning - 5:55
2. Seven Blackbirds - 11:02
3. A Murder of Crows - 1:36
4. The Tides of Sin - 9:19
5. C17H19N03 - 1:53
6. Fear and Bullets - 5:54
7. Sleeping Angel (The Dreaming) - 6:56
8. True Love Always - 4:18
9. The Blessing of the Pig - 11:41
10. The Crow - 9:07
11. Now, Forever - 4:21

== Release history ==
Region	Date	Label	Format	Catalog
United States	1994	Graphitti Designs	CD	
United States	1999	Deezal/Invisible	CD	INV 4003
United States	1999	Enjoy the Ride	LP	ETR07
