= John Bergin =

American illustrator and designer

- Born: June 6, 1966 (age 60)
- Origin: Los Angeles, California
- Genres: Industrial; dark ambient; Experimental music; experimental
- Occupations: Musician; composer; lyricist
- Instruments: vocals, guitar, bass guitar, keyboards, programming
- Years active: 1984–present
- Labels: Lakeshore Records; Stompbox13; Invisible Records; Black Library; Grinder Tool & Die; Crowd Control Activities; Relapse; Reconstriction
- Website: stompbox13.com

John Bergin is a writer, illustrator, designer, and musician. As Art Director at Lakeshore Records. He has created and designed packaging for soundtrack albums such as Stranger Things, Drive, Mandy, Scott Pilgrim Takes Off, Wednesday, Star Trek: Discovery, Star Trek: Picard, Mr. Robot, Napoleon Dynamite, The Walking Dead, Assassin's Creed: Valhalla, Underworld, and hundreds more.

Bergin's Art Direction and Design for the Stranger Things soundtrack vinyl won Communication Arts' Award of Excellence for Packaging Design, 2017.

Bergin is known for his graphic novel From Inside, which he also adapted into a feature-length animated film. As the Director of From Inside, Bergin collaborated with famed music icon Gary Numan who scored the film. From Inside won numerous awards and screened at over 50 international film festivals, including SITGES where the film was awarded Best Animated Feature, Fantasia Film Festival (Jury Prize Best First Feature), Utopiales (Grand Prix), and Future Film Festival of Italy. From Inside was released on streaming and DVD October, 2014.

== Music ==
Bergin's recent releases include Grinder-X, Killer, and Crash & Burn. In 2021, he released Feels Like Rain, a soundtrack for his short story collection of the same title. Other notable releases are Deepflesh, Lolo: Bad Idea, Western Devils: Hers is Blood, and Wednesday, a comic book soundtrack which included music by Daniel Davies (Year Long Disaster, John Carpenter), Geno Lenardo (Filter, Device), Nina Bergman, Will Hunt (Evanescence), Brian Liesegang (Nine Inch Nails, Filter), Mlny Parsonz (Royal Thunder).

Bergin's band Trust Obey, recorded a soundtrack album for The Crow comic book which was released by Graphitti Designs with a deluxe hard cover edition of the graphic novel to coincide with the release of Alex Proyas' original movie adaptation. Trust Obey signed to Trent Reznor's Nothing Records and recorded one album titled Hands of Ash (CDs included a humorous sticker on the front quoting Reznor, after having been released from Nothing Records: "Not a great commercial potential").

Other musical projects by Bergin include C_{17}H_{19}NO_{3}, Tertium Non Data (featuring Pam Bricker), Lance Grabmiller, Paved In Skin, Lolo, and Blackmouth (with Jarboe of Swans and Brett Smith of Caul). Albums were released by these acts from the 1990 to the present by Invisible Records, Crowd Control Activities, Lakeshore Records, and Stompbox13.

Bergin also composed and recorded a soundtrack for the Warhammer 40,000 novel Traitor General by Dan Abnett. The album was released by The Black Library.

In 2019, Bergin music supervised The Rise of the Synths, a documentary film about the synthwave music movement, featuring dozens of bands from the scene, including Carpenter Brut, Perturbator, Gunship, and Waveshaper. The film is narrated by John Carpenter.

== Art ==
Bergin has created album cover designs and illustrations for many bands, such as Ministry, Einstuerzende Neubauten, Naked Raygun, Robert Rich, Gravity Kills, Lustmord, Graham Revell, Test Dept., Damon Elliott, Paul Haslinger, My Life With The Thrill Kill Kult, and many more.

Bergin's on-going comic book series is titled Wednesday. The graphic novel tells the story of a young girl living in a post-apocalyptic wasteland. Bergin has said that at its heart, the comic is about fathers and daughters and "...how they grow together and apart. How they teach each other."

Bergin wrote and illustrated the comic book Ashes (1990), published by Caliber Comics. Through the 1990s, Bergin created short comics and illustrated titles for Heavy Metal Magazine, Marvel, DC, and Dark Horse Comics. In the mid-90s he collaborated with James O'Barr, working as creative talent for Tundra, where they produced The Crow, Bone Saw, IO, and From Inside. For his graphic novel work, Bergin was nominated for the Harvey Award for Best New Talent in 1991. In 1996 Caliber Press published Bergin's comic series Golgothika.

Many of Bergin's comics and illustrations have been re-released by his publishing company, Stompbox13

John Bergin Attended University of the Arts in Philadelphia from 1984 to 1988.
