= Akira (1988 film) =

1988 Japanese animated film by Katsuhiro Otomo

- Theatrical release poster
- アキラ
- Directed by: Katsuhiro Otomo
- Screenplay by: Katsuhiro Otomo; Izo Hashimoto
- Based on: Akira by Katsuhiro Otomo
- Produced by: Ryōhei Suzuki; Shunzō Katō
- Starring: Mitsuo Iwata; Nozomu Sasaki; Mami Koyama; Taro Ishida; Tesshō Genda; Mizuho Suzuki; Tatsuhiko Nakamura; Fukue Itō; Kazuhiro Shindō
- Cinematography: Katsuji Misawa
- Edited by: Takeshi Seyama
- Music by: Shōji Yamashiro
- Production company: Tokyo Movie Shinsha Co., Ltd.
- Distributed by: Toho
- Release date: July 16, 1988
- Running time: 124 minutes
- Country: Japan
- Language: Japanese
- Budget: ¥700 million – ¥1.1 billion/$5.7 million
- Box office: $49 million

Akira (Japanese: アキラ, pronounced [ä́.k̟ʲì.ɾä̀]) is a 1988 Japanese animated cyberpunk action thriller film directed by Katsuhiro Otomo, produced by Ryōhei Suzuki and Shunzō Katō, and written by Otomo and Izo Hashimoto, based on Otomo's 1982 manga Akira. Set in a dystopian 2019, it follows Shōtarō Kaneda, the leader of a biker gang whose childhood friend, Tetsuo Shima, acquires powerful telekinetic abilities after colliding with a child esper in a motorcycle accident, eventually threatening an entire military complex in the sprawling futuristic metropolis of Neo-Tokyo.

While most of the character designs and settings were adapted from the manga, the plot differs considerably and does not include much of the latter half of the manga, which continued publication for two years after the film's release. The soundtrack, which draws heavily from traditional Indonesian gamelan and Japanese noh music, was composed by Shōji Yamashiro and performed by Geinoh Yamashirogumi.

Akira was released in Japan on July 16, 1988, by Toho; it was released the following year in the United States by Streamline Pictures. It garnered an international cult following after various theatrical and VHS releases, eventually earning over $80 million worldwide in home video sales. A landmark in Japanese animation, the film is widely cited as an influential work in the development of anime, adult animation, and Japanese cyberpunk. The film had a massive impact on popular culture worldwide, paving the way for the growth of anime and Japanese popular culture in the Western world, as well as influencing numerous works in animation, comics, film, music, television, and video games.

== Plot ==
In 2019, following a world war triggered by the sudden destruction of Tokyo on July 16, 1988, Neo-Tokyo is plagued by corruption, anti-government protests, terrorism, and gang violence. During a violent rally, the hot-headed Shōtarō Kaneda leads his vigilante bōsōzoku gang, the Capsules, against the rival Clown gang. Kaneda's best friend, Tetsuo Shima, inadvertently crashes his motorcycle into Takashi, an esper who escaped from a government laboratory with the aid of a resistance organization. Assisted by fellow esper Masaru, Japan Self-Defense Forces Colonel Shikishima recaptures Takashi, has Tetsuo hospitalized, and arrests the Capsules. While being interrogated by the police, Kaneda meets Kei, an activist within the resistance movement, and tricks the authorities into releasing her with his gang.

At a secret government facility, Shikishima and his head of research, Doctor Ōnishi, discover that Tetsuo possesses powerful psychic abilities similar to Akira, the esper responsible for Tokyo's 1988 destruction. Esper Kiyoko forewarns Shikishima of Neo-Tokyo's impending destruction, but the city's parliament dismisses Shikishima's concerns, leading him to consider killing Tetsuo to prevent another cataclysm. Meanwhile, Tetsuo escapes from the hospital, steals Kaneda's motorcycle, and tries to flee Neo-Tokyo with his girlfriend Kaori, but the Clowns ambush them. The Capsules rescue Tetsuo and Kaori, but Tetsuo suffers intense headaches and hallucinations and is re-hospitalized.

Overhearing their plan to rescue Tetsuo and the other espers, Kaneda joins Kei's resistance cell. At the hospital, the espers try killing Tetsuo via hallucinations, but the attempt is thwarted. A frustrated Tetsuo searches for them, killing any orderlies and militiamen blocking his path. The resistance group infiltrates the hospital, and Kiyoko draws Kei and Kaneda into Shikishima's and the espers' futile attempts to stop Tetsuo. Kiyoko tells Tetsuo that Akira, located in cryonic storage beneath the Olympic Stadium's construction site, could help Tetsuo with his powers. After betraying everyone around him, including Kaneda, Tetsuo flees the hospital to hunt for Akira.

Using Kei as a medium to stop Tetsuo, Kiyoko breaks her and Kaneda out of military custody. Shikishima stages a coup d'état against Neo-Tokyo's government and directs its military forces to destroy Tetsuo at any cost. At the Capsules' former hangout, Harukiya Bar, Tetsuo confronts gangmates Yamagata and Kai over Kaneda's bike and kills Yamagata after his protest. Kai relays the news to Kaneda, who vows to avenge his friend, while Takashi brings Kei away. Mistaken for Akira by cultists, Tetsuo rampages through Neo-Tokyo, arriving at Akira's cryogenic storage dewar under the stadium. Kei fights Tetsuo, but he defeats her and exhumes Akira, only to find that Akira is dead and his remains were sealed in jars for scientific research.

Kaneda fights Tetsuo with a laser rifle, and Shikishima fires an orbital weapon at him. While the latter destroys his arm, neither can stop him. Shikishima and Kaori approach the stadium, where Tetsuo, now with a robotic arm, is in great pain and losing control over his powers. Kaori tries restraining Tetsuo while Shikishima unsuccessfully offers to heal his injuries and help control his abilities. Kaneda again fights Tetsuo, who weakened from his missing arm, mutates into a gigantic mass of flesh, consuming the stadium, Kaneda, and Kaori, who is killed. The espers revive Akira to stop the growing mass. Reuniting with his friends, Akira creates a singularity, drawing Tetsuo and Kaneda into another dimension. The espers teleport Shikishima to a safe distance as the singularity destroys Neo-Tokyo in a mirror of Tokyo's previous destruction, and they agree to rescue Kaneda, knowing they will not return to this dimension as a result.

In the singularity, Kaneda experiences Tetsuo's and the espers' childhoods, including his and Tetsuo's friendship and the espers' psychic training before Tokyo's destruction. The espers return Kaneda to Neo-Tokyo, informing him that Akira will take Tetsuo to safety and that Kei is developing psychic powers. After consuming much of Neo-Tokyo, the singularity collapses, leaving a flooded crater. Mourning Tetsuo's loss, Kaneda discovers that Kei and Kai have survived and reunites with them, and they ride off into the ruins while Shikishima observes the aftermath and watches the sunrise. In an unspecified plane of reality, Tetsuo introduces himself and triggers the creation of a universe, finally transcending the limitations of human existence.

== Voice cast ==
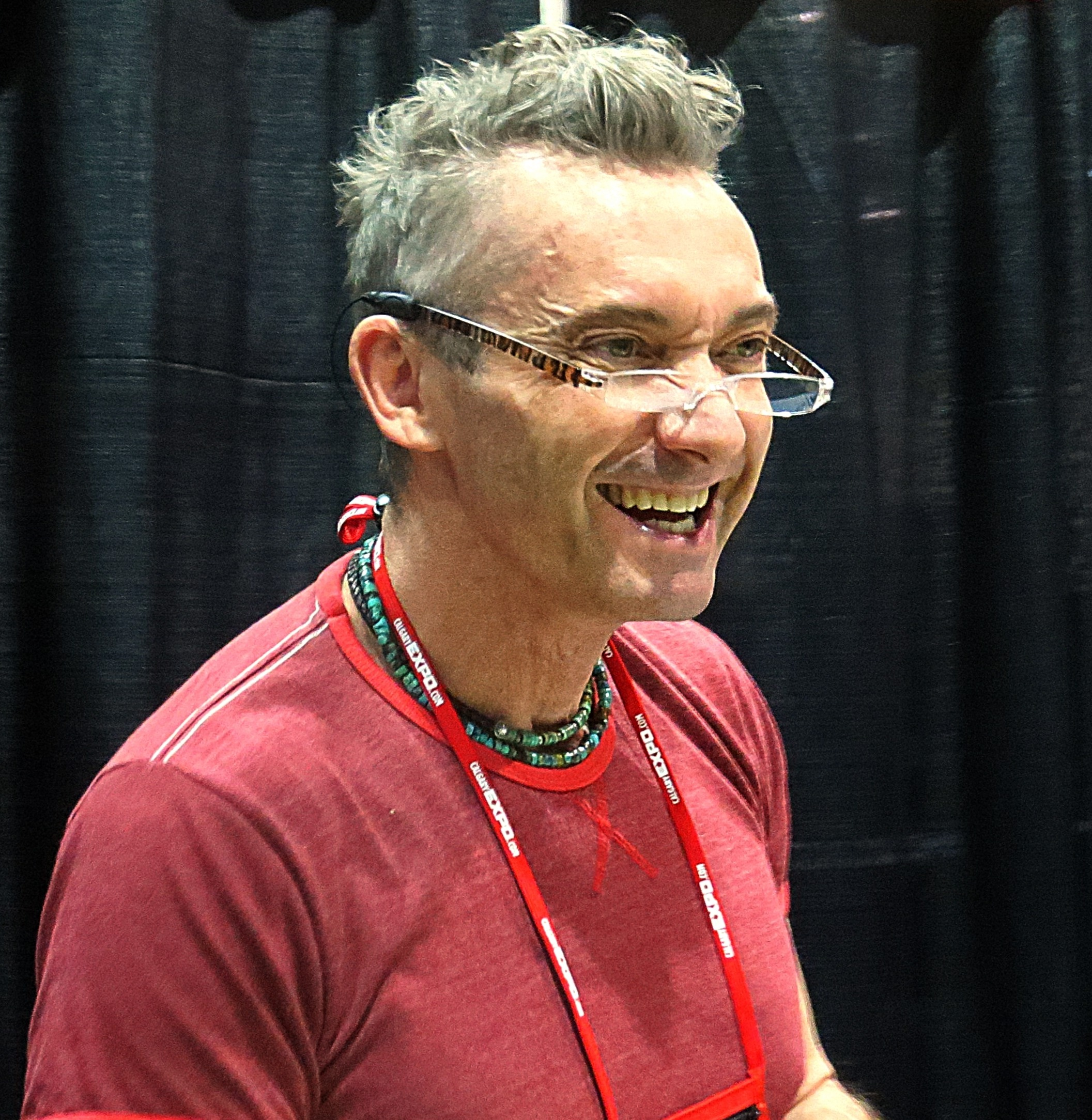
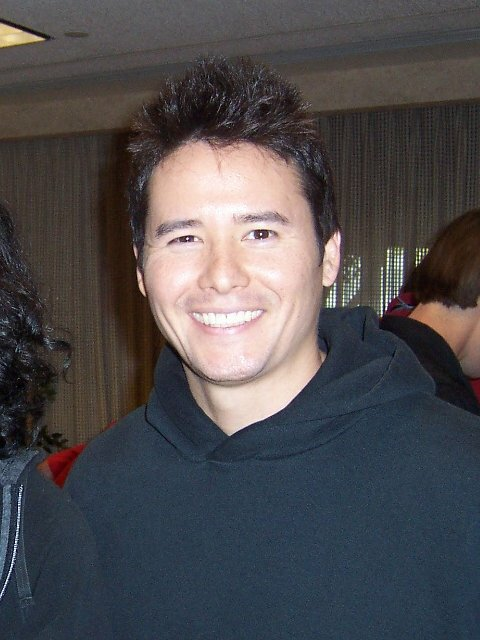
Cam Clarke and Johnny Yong Bosch (top to bottom) voiced Kaneda in the first and second English dub of the film, respectively.

Character	Japanese	English	
Character	Japanese	Electric Media/ Streamline (1989)	Animaze/ Pioneer (2001)
Shōtarō Kaneda	Mitsuo Iwata	Cam Clarke	Johnny Yong Bosch
Tetsuo Shima	Nozomu Sasaki	Jan Rabson	Joshua Seth
Kei	Mami Koyama	Kay	Wendee Lee
Kei	Mami Koyama	Lara Cody	Wendee Lee
Colonel Shikishima	Tarō Ishida	Tony Pope	Jamieson Price
Ryūsaku (Ryu)	Tesshō Genda	Roy	Bob Buchholz
Ryūsaku (Ryu)	Tesshō Genda	Steve Kramer	Bob Buchholz
Doctor Ōnishi	Mizuho Suzuki	Lewis Arquette	Simon Prescott
Takashi (No. 26)	Tatsuhiko Nakamura	Barbara Goodson	Cody MacKenzie
Kiyoko (No. 25)	Fukue Itō	Melora Harte	Sandy Fox
Masaru (No. 27)	Kazuhiro Shindō	Bob Bergen	Travis Weaver
Kaori	Yuriko Fuchizaki	Barbara Goodson	Michelle Ruff
Yamagata	Masaaki Ōkura	Yama	Michael Lindsay
Yamagata	Masaaki Ōkura	Tony Pope	Michael Lindsay
Kai	Takeshi Kusao	Bob Bergen	Anthony Pulcini
Nezu	Hiroshi Ōtake	Insider	Mike Reynolds
Nezu	Hiroshi Ōtake	Tony Pope	Mike Reynolds
Terrorist 1	Masato Hirano	Lewis Arquette	Steve Blum
Terrorist 2	Yukimasa Kishino	Wally Burr	Michael McConnohie
Shimazaki	Yukimasa Kishino	Tony Pope	Robert Axelrod
Colonel's Council Liaison	Kōichi Kitamura	Lewis Arquette	Michael Forest
Eiichi Watanabe	Tarō Arakawa	Bob Bergen	Eddie Frierson
Mitsuru Kuwata	Yukimasa Kishino	Tony Pope	Skip Stellrecht
Yūji Takeyama	Masato Hirano	Jan Rabson	Ted Rae
Groupies	Kayoko Fujii; Masami Toyoshima; Yuka Ōno	Lara Cody; Julie Phelan; Barbara Goodson	Julie Ann Taylor; Patricia Ja Lee; Dyanne DiRosario
Lady Miyako	Kōichi Kitamura	Steve Kramer	William Frederick Knight
Inspector	Michihiro Ikemizu	Bob Bergen	Steve Staley
Army	Kazumi Tanaka	Steve Kramer	Tony Oliver
Mr. Takaba	Issei Futamata	Coach	Daran Norris
Mr. Takaba	Issei Futamata	L. Michael Haller	Daran Norris
Harukiya Bartender	Yōsuke Akimoto	Tony Pope	John Snyder
Committee members	Kōichi Kitamura; Yukimasa Kishino; Masayuki Katō; Masato Hirano; Taro Arakawa; Michihiro Ikemizu	Cam Clarke; L. Michael Haller; Lewis Arquette; Barbara Goodson; Steve Kramer; Jan Rabson; Bob Bergen	Peter Spellos; Dan Lorge; Bob Papenbrook; Michael Sorich; Doug Stone; Paul St. Peter; Christopher Carroll

== Production ==
While working on the Akira manga, Katsuhiro Otomo did not intend to adapt the series; however, he became "very intrigued" when the offer to develop his work for the screen was put before him. He agreed to an anime film adaptation of the series on the condition that he retained creative control of the project – this insistence was based on his experiences working on Harmagedon. The Akira Committee was the name given to a partnership of several major Japanese entertainment companies brought together to realize production of an Akira film. The group's assembly was necessitated by the unconventionally high starting budget of around ¥500,000,000, intended to achieve the desired epic standard equal to Otomo's over 2,000-page manga tale. The committee consisted of Kodansha, Mainichi Broadcasting System, Bandai, Hakuhodo, Toho, LaserDisc Corporation and Sumitomo Corporation, who all forwarded money and promotion towards the film. The animation for the film was provided for by animation producers Tokyo Movie Shinsha (now TMS Entertainment).

Akira had pre-scored dialogue (wherein the dialogue is recorded before the film starts production and the movements of the characters' lips are animated to match it; a first for an anime production and extremely unusual even today for an anime, although the voice actors did perform with the aid of animatics), and super-fluid motion as realized in the film's more than 160,000 animation cels. Computer-generated imagery was also used in the film (produced by High-Tech Lab. Japan Inc. and the cooperative companies for computer graphics, Sumisho Electronic Systems, Inc. and Wavefront Technologies), primarily to animate the pattern indicator used by Doctor Ōnishi, but it was additionally used to plot the paths of falling objects, model parallax effects on backgrounds, and tweak lighting and lens flares. Unlike its live-action predecessors, Akira also had the budget to show a fully realized futuristic Tokyo.

The film's production budget was ¥700 million ($5.5 million), with the combined production and advertising budget believed to be reaching ¥1.1 billion ($9 million). Some sources claim it to the most expensive anime film at the time of release, but this claim is disputed by Crunchyroll writer Daryl Harding.

The teaser trailer for Akira was released in 1987. The film's main production was completed in 1987, with sound recording and mixing performed in early 1988. It was released in 1988, two years before the manga officially ended in 1990. Otomo is claimed to have filled 2,000 pages of notebooks, containing various ideas and character designs for the film, but the final storyboard consisted of a trimmed-down 738 pages. He had great difficulty completing the manga; Otomo has stated that the inspiration for its conclusion arose from a conversation that he had with Alejandro Jodorowsky. He later recalled that the film project had to begin with the writing of an ending that would bring suitable closure to major characters, storylines, and themes without being extraordinarily lengthy, so that he could know in reverse order which manga elements would make the cut into the anime and thus suitably resolve the manga's various elements into a lean, two-hour story. Otomo has called making the film before finishing the manga "the worst possible idea". Although he came to like having two similar but different versions of the same story, he still felt too much of the original was cut out of the film.

Otomo was a big fan of the manga Tetsujin 28-go. As a result, his naming conventions match the characters featured in Tetsujin 28-go: Kaneda shares his name with the protagonist of Tetsujin 28-go; Colonel Shikishima shares his surname with Professor Shikishima of Tetsujin 28-go, while Tetsuo is named after Shikishima's son Tetsuo Shikishima; Akira's Ryūsaku is named after Ryūsaku Murasame. In addition, Takashi has a "26" tattooed on his hand which closely resembles the font used in Tetsujin 28-go. The namesake of the series, Akira, is the 28th in a line of psychics that the government has developed, the same number as Tetsujin-28.

One of the film's key animators was Makiko Futaki; she went on to become a lead animator for Studio Ghibli films such as Kiki's Delivery Service (1989), Princess Mononoke (1997) and Howl's Moving Castle (2004), before her death in 2016. Another key animator who worked on Akira was former Shin-Ei animator Yoshiji Kigami; he animated several entire scenes in Akira, such as the action scene in the sewers. He later joined Kyoto Animation.

== Themes ==
Many commentators have discussed Akira in relation to postwar Japan and fears surrounding large-scale destruction. Susan J. Napier links the film's repeated imagery of catastrophic explosions to memories of the atomic bombings and later Cold War anxieties, arguing that the film treats disaster as something that can recur rather than as a single historical event. Thomas Lamarre similarly describes the film as presenting destruction as cyclical, with psychic power standing in for forces that society repeatedly fails to control.

Another commonly noted theme is the role of government and the military. Critics have pointed to the film's depiction of secret experiments on children as a criticism of state authority and scientific ambition. Napier argues that Akira presents a society in which political institutions rely on force and secrecy, and where attempts to maintain order instead deepen instability. Michelle Le Blanc and Colin Odell also note that the film portrays government power as reactive and fragmented, with military control proving ineffective against the forces it helped create.

Writers have also emphasized the film's focus on youth alienation. The main characters are shown as disconnected from family structures, education, and political power, with Tetsuo's transformation often described as the result of resentment and social exclusion rather than deliberate villainy. Napier identifies Akira as part of a broader trend in Japanese fiction that centers on disaffected youth in post-industrial cities. In Anime from Akira to Princess Mononoke, Napier further describes the film's young characters as emblematic of generational tension in late-20th-century Japan, where young people are depicted as both victims and sources of disruption.

Another recurring subject in discussion of the film is the instability of the human body under extreme power. Lamarre describes the psychic abilities in Akira as blurring the boundary between human beings and weapons, with Tetsuo's physical transformation representing loss of control rather than empowerment. This idea is also discussed in Robot Ghosts and Wired Dreams, which places Akira within a tradition of Japanese science fiction that links bodily mutation to fears about technology and modernity.

Scholars have also connected the film's urban setting to broader ideas about posthumanism and the modern city. In Tokyo Cyberpunk, Akira is discussed as a key work in Japanese visual culture that depicts the city as a space where human identity is reshaped by technology, violence, and social breakdown, rather than by progress or stability.

== Releases ==
=== Box office ===
Box office performance
Territory	Release(s)	Distributor rentals	Gross receipts	Ticket sales
Japan	1988	¥750,000,000	¥1,900,000,000	1,699,463 (est.)
Japan	1989–2000	¥50,000,000	¥120,000,000	103,359 (est.)
Japan	1988–2000	¥800,000,000	Unknown	Unknown
Japan	2005–2007	—N/a	¥137,000,000	111,253 (est.)
Japan	2020	—N/a	¥106,389,400 ($1,130,351)	133,611 (est.)
United States	1989	—N/a	$2,200,000	542,097
United States	2001	—N/a	$114,009	20,143 (est.)
United Kingdom	1991	—N/a	£878,695 ($1,550,000)	382,041
United Kingdom	2011	—N/a	$18,813	3,419
United Kingdom	2015–2018	—N/a	Unknown	15,108
United Kingdom	2020	—N/a	£224,884 ($325,657)	31,629 (est.)
France	1991–2020	—N/a	Unknown	167,372
Spain	1992–2013	—N/a	Unknown	134,324
Spain	2016–2018	—N/a	Unknown	2,018
Spain	1992–2018	—N/a	Unknown	136,342
Finland	2020	—N/a	Unknown	6,262
Other European countries	1999–2013	—N/a	Unknown	25,047
Other European countries	2014–2018	—N/a	Unknown	10,590
Other European countries	1999–2018	—N/a	Unknown	35,622
Quebec (Canada)	2001–2002	—N/a	Unknown	532
Taiwan	2006–2008	—N/a	US$230,000	40,000
South Korea	2017	—N/a	₩86,224,200	10,574
New Zealand	2017	—N/a	US$36,342	Unknown
Hong Kong	2020	—N/a	US$148,415	Unknown
Australia	2020	—N/a	US$183,882	Unknown
Worldwide	1988–2020		$49,000,000	3,569,771+ (est.)

Akira was released by Toho on July 16, 1988. At the Japanese box office, it was the sixth highest-grossing Japanese film of the year, earning a distribution income (distributor rentals) of ¥750 million in 1988. It topped the box office at the onset, making it a success in the Japanese market. By 2000, the film had earned a Japanese distribution rental income of ¥800 million. The film's 4K remaster received a limited Japanese IMAX re-release in May 2020.

=== English releases ===
Electric Media produced an English dub of the film in 1989 that was written by L. Michael Haller and directed by Sheldon Renan and Wally Burr. The English version saw limited release by Streamline Pictures in North American theaters on December 25, 1989, and grossed about $2.2 million in the United States.

After Pioneer Entertainment acquired the rights to the film, a new English dub was produced by Animaze and directed by Kevin Seymour in 2001 for the DVD release to obtain THX certification. Pioneer re-released the film with the new dub in select theaters from March through December 2001, making it the 20th digital cinema release in North America. The restored 4K version was shown in North American movie theaters on September 24, 2020, and for multiple days in select IMAX auditoriums and other cinemas worldwide. On July 2, 2026, Crunchyroll announced the 4K version would receive a theatrical re-release throughout North America and Canada beginning on September 4, 2026.

In the United Kingdom, Akira was theatrically released by Island Visual Arts on January 25, 1991. It debuted at number three on the UK box office charts, grossing £439,345 in its opening weekend. The film was fourth place the following week, was in the top ten for four weeks, and in the top 12 for seven weeks, grossing £878,695 by early March 1991. It was re-released on July 13, 2013, celebrating the 25th anniversary of the film, and again on September 21, 2016. The 4K and IMAX re-release in October 2020 debuted at number three on the UK box office charts, grossing £201,124 in its opening weekend.

In Australia, the 4K version was theatrically re-released in cinemas through Sugoi Co on May 2–3, 2026.

=== Home media ===
The Streamline dub was first released to VHS through Streamline's Video Comics label in May 1991 and received wider distribution from Orion Home Video in September 1993. Orion also distributed the original Japanese version with English subtitles on VHS, making Akira one of Streamline's few titles to have a Japanese audio release. The Criterion Collection released a LaserDisc with the Streamline dub and Japanese audio in 1992, which was the company's first animated release and its only until Fantastic Mr. Fox in 2014.

Pioneer released a restored version to home media in 2001. The release featured a single- and two-disc DVD set, the latter in a Steelbook, with the second English dub and Japanese audio, along with VHS versions of these audio tracks. It was one of the few releases from Pioneer to feature THX-certified audio and video. Although Pioneer intended to have the Streamline dub in the release, it was excluded to maintain the THX certification.

In the United Kingdom, Akira was first released on VHS by Island World Communications in 1991. By 1993, the film had sold 60,000 tapes in the United Kingdom, 100,000 tapes in Europe, and 100,000 tapes in the United States. The success of this release led to the creation of Manga Entertainment, which later assumed distribution. Manga released a two-disc DVD set in 2004, which featured the restored version with the Japanese audio and Pioneer dub on the first disc and a VHS transfer of the Streamline dub on the second.

A Blu-ray disc edition of the film was released on February 24, 2009, in North America by Bandai Entertainment under the Honneamise label. A Blu-ray edition of Akira was subsequently released in Australia by Madman Entertainment under exclusive license from Manga and Kodansha. Madman also released a DVD/Blu-ray combo; its license is separate from the standalone Blu-ray release because instead of the DVD version being the Manga Video UK version, it uses Madman/Manga's 2001 Special Edition DVD release, which is licensed from Manga UK. The Blu-ray release is the first to use the format's highest audio sampling rate (Dolby TrueHD 5.1 at 192 kHz for the Japanese audio track) and first to use the hypersonic effect (only available on the Japanese track and on high-end audio systems). Beyond Japanese with English subtitles, the Blu-ray also features the 2001 Pioneer/Animaze English dub (TrueHD 5.1 at 48 kHz). The DVD version was again released in 2012 by Bandai Entertainment. The film was licensed again by Funimation following Bandai Entertainment's closure shortly after its DVD release. The Funimation release includes both English dubs, Streamline in stereo and Pioneer in 5.1 surround (both TrueHD at 96 kHz). Funimation released a 25th anniversary Blu-ray/DVD combo and a separate DVD release on November 12, 2013, which features the TrueHD Japanese audio and both English dubs (TrueHD at 96 kHz on Blu-ray). Best Buy released a limited edition exclusive Blu-ray Steelbook the same year.

On April 24, 2020, an Ultra HD Blu-ray version was released in Japan by Bandai Namco Entertainment, featuring a 4K HDR remaster sourced from the original 35 mm film print, as well as the 192 kHz audio transfer created for prior Blu-ray releases. The same remaster was released by FUNimation on December 22, 2020.

As of 2014, the film has earned over $80 million in worldwide home video sales. In the United States, it was the seventh best-selling DVD anime film of all time as of 2006 and grossed $2,086,180 in Blu-ray sales as of January 2022. In the United Kingdom, it was 2020's ninth best-selling foreign language film on physical home video formats and the year's second best-selling Japanese film (below the animated Weathering with You).

=== Television ===
The Streamline dub aired on the Sci-Fi Channel in the 1990s during its week-long anime events and Saturday Anime block. The Pioneer dub aired twice on Adult Swim's Toonami programming block, once on December 7, 2013, with a rating of TV-MA-V, and again on December 20, 2014, both times with explicit language and nudity censored. It has aired numerous times on Australian FTA station SBS. In the United Kingdom, the film aired several times on BBC Two between 1994 and 1997.

== Reception ==
=== Critical response ===
On review aggregator Rotten Tomatoes, the film has an approval score of 88% based on 103 reviews. The site's critical consensus reads, "Akira is strikingly bloody and violent, but its phenomenal animation and sheer kinetic energy helped set the standard for modern anime." Metacritic, which uses a weighted average, assigned the film a score of 68 out of 100, based on 22 critics, indicating "generally favorable" reviews.

From contemporary reviews, Tony Rayns commented in The Monthly Film Bulletin that the narrative was paced at such "speed and complexity" that "viewers who come to it without prior knowledge of the manga (comic-strip) version tend to find it almost overpowering", concluding that "The film virtually demands to be 'read' alongside the manga, and amounts to a kind of commentary on it." Discussing the story, Rayns found the film "not particularly ground-breaking as science fiction", comparing the film to be between Blade Runner and 2001: A Space Odyssey, with the film's main achievement being "the sheer credibility of his vision of future-tech, as seen in fully thorough designs of vehicles, laboratory equipment" and that the film "yields some extremely arresting images in the film's closing scenes" and that "Simply as animation, Akira is an undoubted tour de force." Variety praised aspects of the film "from the imaginative and detailed design of tomorrow to the booming Dolby effects on the soundtrack" but criticized the "slight stiffness in the drawing of human movement". Chicago Tribune's Dave Kehr commended Otomo's "excellent animation-specific ideas: Vehicles leave little color trails as they roar through the night, and there are a number of dream sequences that make nice use of the medium's ability to confound scale and distort perspective".

From retrospective reviews, Anime News Network's Bamboo Dong commended the Limited Edition's DVD for its "superbly translated" English subtitles and the commendable English dubbing, which "sticks very close to the English translation, and the voice actors deliver their lines with emotion". THEM Anime's Raphael See applauded the film's "astounding special effects and clean, crisp animation". Chris Beveridge commented on the Japanese audio, which he said brings "the forward soundstage nicely into play when required. Dialogue is well placed, with several key moments of directionality used perfectly". Janet Maslin of The New York Times commended Otomo's artwork, stating that "the drawings of Neo-Tokyo by night are so intricately detailed that all the individual windows of huge skyscrapers appear distinct. And these night scenes glow with subtle, vibrant color". Richard Harrison of The Washington Post commented on the pace of the film, stating that the author "has condensed the narrative sprawl of the comics to provide coherence, though there's a bit of "Back to the Future Part II" incompleteness to the story. That hardly matters, since the film moves with such kinetic energy that you'll be hanging on for dear life". Roger Ebert compared the film to Mad Max, calling it "very gory, very gruesome, but entertaining in its own demented way." Kim Newman of Empire commended the film's "scintillating animated visuals, with not one – not one – computer-assisted shot in sight". Helen McCarthy stated in 500 Essential Anime Movies that the film "remains fresh and exciting, easily holding its own against the products of two decades of massive technical advancement". In February 2004, Dan Persons of Cinefantastique listed the film as one of the "10 Essential Animations", simply referring to the film as "the film that changed everything."

=== Awards ===
In 1992, Akira won the Silver Scream Award at the Amsterdam Fantastic Film Festival. The film was one of the four nominees for the 2007 American Anime Awards "Best Anime Feature" award, but it lost to Final Fantasy VII: Advent Children.

=== Controversy and censorship ===
In July 2021, the Oktyabrsky District Court in Saint Petersburg banned the distribution of Akira, along with Happy Tree Friends and Mortal Kombat Legends: Scorpion's Revenge, claiming that the film posed a possible threat to children's health and psychological development.

== Music ==
AKIRA: Original Soundtrack (Symphonic Suite AKIRA) was recorded by Geinoh Yamashirogumi (芸能山城組). The music was composed and conducted by musical director Shōji Yamashiro (pseudonym of Tsutomu Ōhashi), and performed by the collective Geinoh Yamashirogumi. The soundtrack incorporates traditional Indonesian music forms, including jegog, gamelan, and kecak in addition to elements of Japanese noh music and Buddhist Chant.

It features music that was additionally re-recorded for release. "Kaneda," "Battle Against Clown," and "Exodus From the Underground Fortress" are part of the same song cycle – elements of "Battle Against Clown" can be heard during the opening bike sequence. The score is generally sequenced in the same order that the music occurs in the film. The North American version features extensive production notes by David Keith Riddick and Robert Napton.

AKIRA: The Original Japanese Soundtrack, an alternate soundtrack, was also released. This version included music as it appeared in the film, with dialogue and sound-effects, albeit ordered out of sequence.

The soundtrack spawned an album of electronica remixes from Bwana, called Capsules Pride. Samples from the Akira soundtrack have also been featured in numerous other hip hop and electronic music tracks.

== Adaptations ==
=== Video games ===
In 1988, Taito released an Akira adventure game for the Famicom exclusively in Japan. Another Akira game for the Jaguar, Super NES, Genesis and Sega CD was being developed, but it was canceled along with prospects of another Akira title for the Game Boy and Game Gear handheld consoles. International Computer Entertainment produced a video game based on Akira for the Amiga and Amiga CD32 in 1994. To coincide with the DVD release in 2002, Bandai released Akira Psycho Ball, a pinball simulator for the PlayStation 2.

=== Live-action film ===
Warner Bros. Pictures had held the rights to create a live-action adaptation of Akira from 2002 through 2025. Multiple abortive attempts at the production took place over the decades, with at least five different directors and ten different writers known to have been attached to it. Warner Bros.' final attempt had seen director Taika Waititi attached, with filming planned to start in July 2019 for a May 2021 release. However, Warner Bros. put the film on indefinite hold just prior to filming due to Waititi's decision to first direct Thor: Love and Thunder; years passed without any announcements on Akira while Waititi took on additional projects. In June 2025, Warner Bros. Pictures gave up the distribution rights to the film, and Waititi was no longer involved with the project.

== Legacy ==
Akira is widely regarded as one of the greatest animated movies of all time and helped to increase anime's popularity outside of Japan. In Channel 4's 2005 poll of the 100 greatest animations of all time featuring both film and television, Akira came in at number 16. On Empire magazine's list of the 500 greatest movies of all time, Akira was ranked number 440. It features again on Empire's list of The 100 Best Films Of World Cinema, coming in at No. 51. IGN ranked it 14th on its list of the Top 25 Animated Movies of All-Time. The film also made Time magazine's list of top 5 anime DVDs. It ranked number 16 on Time Out's top 50 animated movies list and number 5 on Total Film's Top 50 Animated Films list. The film was ranked No. 1 by Wizard's Anime magazine on their "Top 50 Anime released in North America" list in 2001. It was ranked No. 4 on The Hollywood Reporter critic's list of "10 Best Animated Films for Adults" in 2016. Roger Ebert of the Chicago Sun-Times selected Akira as his "Video Pick of the Week" in 1992 on Siskel & Ebert and the Movies. For its wider 2001 release, he gave the film a "Thumbs Up".

Akira has also been regarded as one of the greatest action and science fiction films of all time. It was ranked number 22 on The Guardian's list of best sci-fi and fantasy films, included on Film4's list of top 50 science fiction films, and ranked number 27 on Complex magazine's list of the 50 best sci-fi movies. The Daily Telegraph listed Akira as the fifth greatest action film of all time. Phelim O'Neill of the Guardian drew a parallel on Akira's influence on the science-fiction genre to Blade Runner and Stanley Kubrick's 2001: A Space Odyssey. Akira is considered a landmark film in the cyberpunk genre, particularly Japanese cyberpunk. The British Film Institute describes Akira as a vital cornerstone of the cyberpunk genre, along with Blade Runner and Neuromancer. Rob Garratt of South China Morning Post called Akira one of "the most influential sci-fi visions ever realised" on film, comparable to the influence of Blade Runner. Akira is also credited as a breakthrough for adult animation, proving to global audiences that animation was not just for children.

=== Akira slide ===

The "Akira slide" is a scene where Kaneda enters the frame while using a sideways slide to stop his motorbike, leaving a trail of smoke and electric sparks. It is referenced in many works of animation, film, television, and video games. According to the Historical Dictionary of Science Fiction, the term "Akira slide" was first recorded in 2009.

=== Cultural influence ===
Akira is regarded by many critics as a landmark anime film, one that influenced much of the art in the anime world that followed its release, with many illustrators in the manga industry citing the film as an important influence. Naruto author Masashi Kishimoto, for example, recalled being fascinated with the way the poster was made and wished to imitate series' creator Katsuhiro Otomo's style. The film had a significant effect on popular culture worldwide, leading the way for the growth in popularity of anime, as well as Japanese popular culture in general, in the Western world. Akira is considered a forerunner of the second wave of anime fandom that began in the early 1990s and has gained a significant cult following since then. It is credited with setting the precedent for anime franchises such as Pokémon, Dragon Ball and Naruto to become global cultural phenomena. According to The Guardian, the "cult 1988 anime taught western film-makers new ideas in storytelling, and helped cartoons grow up".

Akira has influenced numerous works in animation, comics, film, music, television, and video games. It inspired a wave of Japanese science fiction and cyberpunk works, including manga and anime series such as Ghost in the Shell, Battle Angel Alita, Cowboy Bebop, Serial Experiments Lain, and Elfen Lied, live-action Japanese films such as Tetsuo: The Iron Man, and video games such as Hideo Kojima's Snatcher, Policenauts and Metal Gear Solid, and Square Enix's Final Fantasy VII. Outside of Japan, Akira has been cited as a major influence on Hollywood films such as The Matrix, Dark City, Kill Bill, Chronicle, Looper, The Dark Knight, Midnight Special, Inception, Pacific Rim, Godzilla, Spider-Man: Into the Spider-Verse, Puss in Boots: The Last Wish, and Predator: Killer of Killers, television shows such as Stranger Things, and video games such as Core Design's Switchblade, Valve's Half-Life series, and Dontnod Entertainment's Remember Me. John Gaeta cited Akira as artistic inspiration for the bullet time effect in The Matrix films. Akira has also been credited with influencing the Star Wars franchise, including the prequel film trilogy and the Clone Wars film and television series. Todd McFarlane cited Akira as an influence on HBO animated television series Spawn.

Akira has also influenced the work of musicians. The music video for the Michael Jackson and Janet Jackson song "Scream" (1995) features clips from Akira. Kanye West cited Akira as a major influence on his work, and he paid homage to the film in the "Stronger" (2007) music video. Lupe Fiasco's album Tetsuo & Youth (2015) is named after Tetsuo Shima. Kaneda's motorcycle appears in Steven Spielberg's film Ready Player One, and CD Projekt's video game Cyberpunk 2077. Deus Ex: Mankind Divided video game developer Eidos Montréal also paid homage to the film's poster. The season four premiere of Rick and Morty ("Edge of Tomorty: Rick Die Rickpeat") features a scene in which Morty, and then Rick, are transformed into a giant tendrilled monster that Jerry and Beth later refer to as "an Akira". The 2000 South Park episode "Trapper Keeper" contains references to Akira, such as one of the characters transforming into a giant blob organism before absorbing several other characters, similar to the film. The stage name of pornographic actress Asa Akira also comes from Akira. The music video for Grimes's "Delete Forever" pays homage to Tetsuo's penultimate moments on the Olympic throne.

When Tokyo was chosen to host the 2020 Summer Olympics in the 2013 bidding process, several commentators claimed that Akira predicted the future event. In 2017, Akira was referred to in several Tokyo Olympic promotions. In February 2020, during the COVID-19 pandemic and 147 days before the Olympics, a scene in Akira which calls for the cancellation of the 2020 Olympics and graffiti stating Just Cancel It! (147 days before the event) led to a social media trend calling for the cancellation of the 2020 Olympics, where it topped trending Twitter topics in Japan. The Summer Olympics were eventually postponed to 2021 due to the pandemic.

== See also ==
- List of cult films

== Bibliography ==
- Rayns, Tony (March 1991). "Akira". Monthly Film Bulletin. Vol. 58, no. 686.
