= Symphonic Suite Akira =

1988 soundtrack album

Soundtrack album by Geinoh Yamashirogumi
- Released: July 27, 1988
- Studios: Victor Aoyama Studio; Shōbi Gakuen Vario-Hall; Hitomi Memorial Hall
- Genres: Film score; gamelan; shōmyō; noh
- Length: 69:36
- Language: Japanese
- Label: Invitation
- Producer: Shoji Yamashiro

Geinoh Yamashirogumi chronology
Ecophony Rinne (1986)	Symphonic Suite Akira (1988)	Akira: Original Motion Picture Soundtrack (1988)

Singles from Symphonic Suite Akira
- 1. "Theme of Akira" Released: July 16, 1988

Alternative cover
- 1990 North America release cover

Symphonic Suite Akira (交響組曲アキラ, Kōkyō Kumikyoku Akira) is the soundtrack album to the 1988 anime film Akira by Japanese musical collective Geinoh Yamashirogumi, released by Invitation on July 27, 1988. The music was composed and conducted by musical director Shoji Yamashiro. The soundtrack draws heavily from Japanese noh, Buddhist chants, and traditional Indonesian gamelan music.

A CD single titled "Theme of Akira" (AKIRAのテーマ, Akira no Tēma) was released on July 16, 1988. The title track is a medley of "Kaneda" and "Battle Against Clown", while "Tetsuo's Metamorphosis" (鉄雄のメタモルフォーゼ, Tetsuo no Metamorufōze) uses sections of "Mutation" and "Exodus from the Underground Fortress".

The album was first released in North America by JVC in 1990 as Akira: Original Soundtrack. It was reissued in 2000 by AnimeTrax and in 2004 by Geneon. The album was re-released by Milan Records as Akira: Symphonic Suite on September 15, 2017.

== Track listing ==
=== CD version ===
All music is composed by Shoji Yamashiro.

No.	Title	Length
1.	"Kaneda" (金田)	3:12
2.	"Battle Against Clown" (クラウンとの闘い, Kuraun to no Tatakai)	3:39
3.	"Winds Over the Neo-Tokyo" (ネオ東京上空の風, Neo-Tōkyō Jōkū no Kaze)	2:46
4.	"Tetsuo" (鉄雄)	10:17
5.	"Dolls' Polyphony" (ぬいぐるみのポリフォニー, Nuigurumi no Porifonī)	2:55
6.	"Shohmyoh" (唱名)	10:13
7.	"Mutation" (変容; Hen'yō)	4:51
8.	"Exodus from the Underground Fortress" (ケイと金田の脱出, Kei to Kaneda no Dasshitsu, "Kei and Kaneda's Escape")	3:18
9.	"Illusion" (回想, Kaisō)	13:59
10.	"Requiem" (未来, Mirai)	14:26
Total length:		69:36

=== DVD-Audio version ===
No.	Title	Length
1.	"Kaneda"	3:43
2.	"Battle Against Clown"	3:35
3.	"Winds Over the Neo-Tokyo"	3:22
4.	"Tetsuo: The Theme of Tetsuo I – Special Patterns" (鉄雄：鉄雄のテーマⅠ・スペシャルパターン)	3:28
5.	"Tetsuo: The Theme of Tetsuo II – Awakening I, II" (鉄雄：鉄雄のテーマⅡ・覚醒Ⅰ、Ⅱ, Tetsuo: Tetsuo no Tēma II – Kakusei I, II)	1:36
6.	"Tetsuo: Awakening III / Meditation" (鉄雄：覚醒Ⅲ・メディテーション)	3:12
7.	"Tetsuo: Coda" (鉄雄：コーダ)	1:59
8.	"Dolls' Polyphony"	2:56
9.	"Shohmyoh: Kongō Kaigo Futsu Shingon – Shihosan" (唱名：金剛界五仏真言・四方讃, "Shohmyoh: The Five Buddhas Mantra of the Vajradhatu Mandala and the Hymns of the Four Directions")	2:46
10.	"Shohmyoh: Shiharamitsusan" (唱名：四波羅蜜讃, "Shohmyoh: The Four Paramitas")	3:18
11.	"Shohmyoh: Shohgondarani" (唱名：荘厳陀羅尼, "Shohmyoh: Adorned Dharani")	4:03
12.	"Mutation"	5:22
13.	"Exodus from the Underground Fortress"	3:20
14.	"Illusion: Netori / Notto / Issei / Nanori" (回想：音取・のっと・一声・名宣)	6:32
15.	"Illusion: Iroe / Tetsuo's Statement" (回想：いろゑ・鉄雄の陳述, Kaisō: Iroe / Tetsuo no Chinjutsu)	4:45
16.	"Illusion: Prayer" (回想：祈り, Kaisō: Inori)	2:48
17.	"Requiem: Prologue / Requiem Aeternum / Vocalise" (未来：序・レクイエムエテルナム・無言歌, Mirai: Jo / Rekuiemu Eterunamu / Mugon uta)	4:16
18.	"Requiem: Invention / Tocatta" (未来：インベンション・トッカータ)	4:16
19.	"Requiem: Shu / Recollections of a Festival / Rest in Peace" (未来：咒・祭りの回想・眠れ, Mirai: Jū / Matsuri no Kaisō / Nemure)	6:00
Total length:		71:19

=== LP version ===
==== Original Victor release ====
Side one
No.	Title	Length
1.	"Kaneda"
2.	"Tetsuo"
3.	"Ohjifuchi (Note: "Ohjifuchi" is a rearranged version of "Mutation")" (應時普地)

Side two
No.	Title	Length
1.	"Exodus from the Underground Fortress"
2.	"Requiem"

==== 2017 Milan Records release ====
Side one
No.	Title	Length
1.	"Kaneda"
2.	"Battle Against Clown"
3.	"Tetsuo"

Side two
No.	Title	Length
1.	"Shohmyoh"
2.	"Dolls' Polyphony"
3.	"Exodus from the Underground Fortress"

Side three
No.	Title	Length
1.	"Winds Over the Neo-Tokyo"
2.	"Illusion"

Side four
No.	Title	Length
1.	"Mutation"
2.	"Requiem"

== Personnel ==
Additional musicians

- Tsuyoshi Kon – guitar
- Tokihiko Morishita – keyboard
- Tadashi Namba – keyboard
- Nobu Saitō – percussion
- Hideo Yamaki – drums
- Yukihiro Issoh – noh (fuekata)
- Junzō Miyamasu – noh (tsuzumikata)
- Nobuyuki Shirasaka – noh (ōkawakata)
- Masamichi Yamazaki – noh (shitekata)
- Kiyoshi Yoshitani – noh (taikokata)
- Ida Bagus Sugata – Balinese tantra
- Kunihiko Tominaga – synthesizer programming
- Kenji Niina – synthesizer programming

== Akira: Original Motion Picture Soundtrack ==
Akira: Original Motion Picture Soundtrack

Soundtrack album by Geinoh Yamashirogumi
- Released: October 10, 1988
- Studios: Victor Aoyama Studio; Shōbi Gakuen Vario-Hall; Hitomi Memorial Hall
- Genres: Film score; gamelan; shōmyō; noh
- Length: 43:11
- Language: Japanese
- Label: Victor
- Producer: Shoji Yamashiro

Geinoh Yamashirogumi chronology
Symphonic Suite Akira (1988)	Akira: Original Motion Picture Soundtrack (1988)	Ecophony Gaia (1990)

Akira: Original Motion Picture Soundtrack is an alternate version of Symphonic Suite Akira, released by Victor Entertainment on October 10, 1988. It features the film score mixed with dialogue from the film.

The album was released in the United Kingdom by Demon Soundtracks as Akira: The Original Japanese Soundtrack in 1994.

=== Track listing ===
No.	Title	Length
1.	"Kaneda (Note: Features "Requiem", "Kaneda", "Winds Over the Neo-Tokyo", "Tetsuo", and "Battle Against Clown")"	9:59
2.	"Tetsuo I (Note: Features "Tetsuo", "Shohmyoh", "Illusion", "Dolls' Polyphony", and "Exodus from the Underground Fortress")"	12:59
3.	"Tetsuo II (Note: Features "Tetsuo", "Requiem", "Mutation", and "Illusion")"	12:36
4.	"Akira (Note: Features "Requiem" and "Exodus from the Underground Fortress")"	7:56
Total length:		43:11

=== Cast ===
- Mitsuo Iwata as Shōtarō Kaneda
- Nozomu Sasaki as Tetsuo Shima
- Mami Koyama as Kei
- Tarō Ishida as Colonel Shikishima
- Kazuhiro Shindō as Masaru (No. 27)
- Tatsuhiko Nakamura as Takashi (No. 26)
- Fukue Itō as Kiyoko (No. 25)
- Tesshō Genda as Ryūsaku (Ryu)
- Yuriko Fuchizaki as Kaori
- Masaaki Ōkura as Yamagata
- Takeshi Kusao as Kai
- Masato Hirano as Terrorist
- Tarō Arakawa as Eiichi Watanabe
- Masami Toyoshima as a Groupie
- Mizuho Suzuki as Doctor Ōnishi

== Akira Remix ==
Akira Remix

Soundtrack album by Geinoh Yamashirogumi
- Released: August 21, 2024
- Studios: Prime Sound Studio Form Daikanyama; Studio Mech; Monogram Studios; MIT Studio; (Disc 2 tracks 1–3)
- Genres: Film score; gamelan; shōmyō; noh; hip-hop; electronica
- Length: 83:11
- Language: Japanese
- Label: Victor
- Producer: Shoji Yamashiro

Geinoh Yamashirogumi chronology
Silk Road Genjoh I, II Byzantine no Hibiki (1994)	Akira Remix (2024)

Music video
- Akira Remix digest on YouTube

Akira Remix is a remix album based on Symphonic Suite Akira, released by Victor Entertainment on CD and digital platforms on August 21, 2024, and on LP on March 26, 2025. Akira creator Katsuhiro Otomo served as the two-disc album's executive producer and selected three musicians for this project. Makoto Kubota (of Makoto Kubota & the Sunset Gang and Les Rallizes Dénudés) remixed the 13 tracks on the first disc, while Pizzicato Five founder Yasuharu Konishi and anime score composer Kuniaki Haishima each remixed three tracks on the second disc.

The album peaked at No. 18 on Oricon's Weekly Albums chart and No. 19 on Billboard Japan's Hot Albums chart.

=== Track listing ===
Disc 1
No.	Title	Length
1.	"Kaneda" (Remixed by Makoto Kubota)	3:23
2.	"Battle Against Clown" (Remixed by Makoto Kubota)	1:52
3.	"Winds Over the Neo-Tokyo" (Remixed by Makoto Kubota)	3:58
4.	"Dolls' Polyphony" (Remixed by Makoto Kubota)	4:06
5.	"Exodus from the Underground Fortress" (Remixed by Makoto Kubota)	3:26
6.	"Illusion" (Remixed by Makoto Kubota)	2:56
7.	"Mutation" (Remixed by Makoto Kubota)	4:22
8.	"Requiem" (Remixed by Makoto Kubota)	6:00
9.	"Tetsuo" (Remixed by Makoto Kubota)	3:21
10.	"Shohmyoh" (Remixed by Makoto Kubota)	2:39
11.	"Requiem Part 2" (Remixed by Makoto Kubota)	4:13
12.	"Shohmyoh" (Remixed by Makoto Kubota)	4:05
13.	"Tetsuo 2" (Remixed by Makoto Kubota)	2:48
Total length:		47:07

Disc 2
No.	Title	Length
1.	"Winds Over the Neo-Tokyo" (Remixed by Yasuharu Konishi)	6:19
2.	"Dolls' Polyphony" (Remixed by Yasuharu Konishi)	5:36
3.	"Requiem" (Remixed by Yasuharu Konishi)	7:33
4.	"Kaneda" (Remixed by Kuniaki Haishima)	3:48
5.	"Shohmyoh" (Remixed by Kuniaki Haishima)	8:52
6.	"Illusion" (Remixed by Kuniaki Haishima)	3:53
Total length:		35:58

=== Personnel ===
Additional musicians

- Takashi Mizutani – guitar (disc 1 track 1)
- Daichi Itō – drums (disc 1 track 1)
- Yukihiro Fukutomi – programming (disc 2 tracks 1–3)
- Ryusuke Kakizawa – drums, pandeiro (disc 2 tracks 1–3)

=== Charts ===
Chart (2024)	Peak position
Oricon Japanese Albums	18
Billboard Japan Hot Albums	19
Billboard Japan Top Download Albums	22
Billboard Japan Top Album Sales	18

== See also ==
- 1988 in Japanese music
