= Tetsuo Shima =

- Akira character
- Tetsuo Shima, as illustrated by Katsuhiro Otomo
- First appearance: Akira: "Tetsuo" (1982)
- Created by: Katsuhiro Otomo
- Voiced by: Nozomu Sasaki, Jan Rabson, Joshua Seth

Tetsuo Shima (Japanese: 島 鉄雄, Hepburn: Shima Tetsuo), is the main antagonist of Akira, a manga created by Katsuhiro Otomo. Tetsuo is mentally unbalanced childhood friend of the protagonist Shotaro Kaneda, a biker from a dystopian Japan where he has an inferiority complex over Kaneda. Tetsuo is kidnapped and experimented, developing an his unstable and destructive telekinetic abilities to ravage the city and awaken a mysterious entity with powerful psychic abilities named "Akira". This causes Tetsuo to develop an antagonistic side to become superior than Kaneda and any individual he feels inferior, eventually having a fight against his friend in the city.

Tetsuo was created by Otomo with his name being based on a Tetsujin 28-gō character. He is voiced by Nozomu Sasaki in Japanese. The character was highly popular for the commentary it provides on the rebellious youth based on his background and culture which is common in Japan. The character's powers also led to the creation of a fighting game character K9999 from The King of Fighters 2001 who was highly controversial over his similarities with Tetsuo especially with Sasaki voicing both.

== Role in Akira ==
He evolves from Kaneda's best friend and gang member to his nemesis. He is involved in an accident at the very beginning of the story, which causes him to display immense psychic powers. He is soon recruited by the Colonel and became a test subject known as No. 41 (41号, Yonjūichi-gō). It is mentioned that he is Akira's successor; however, Tetsuo's mental instability increases with the manifestation of his powers, which ultimately drives him insane and he ruins his friendship with Kaneda. Later in the story, he becomes Akira's second-in-command, before he begins to lose control of his powers. Eventually, Kei battles Tetsuo, unlocking his full power and triggering another psychic explosion. Akira, watched by his fellow Espers, absorbs Tetsuo's explosion by creating one of his own. With Akira and the espers, he ascends to a higher plane of existence.

== Creation ==
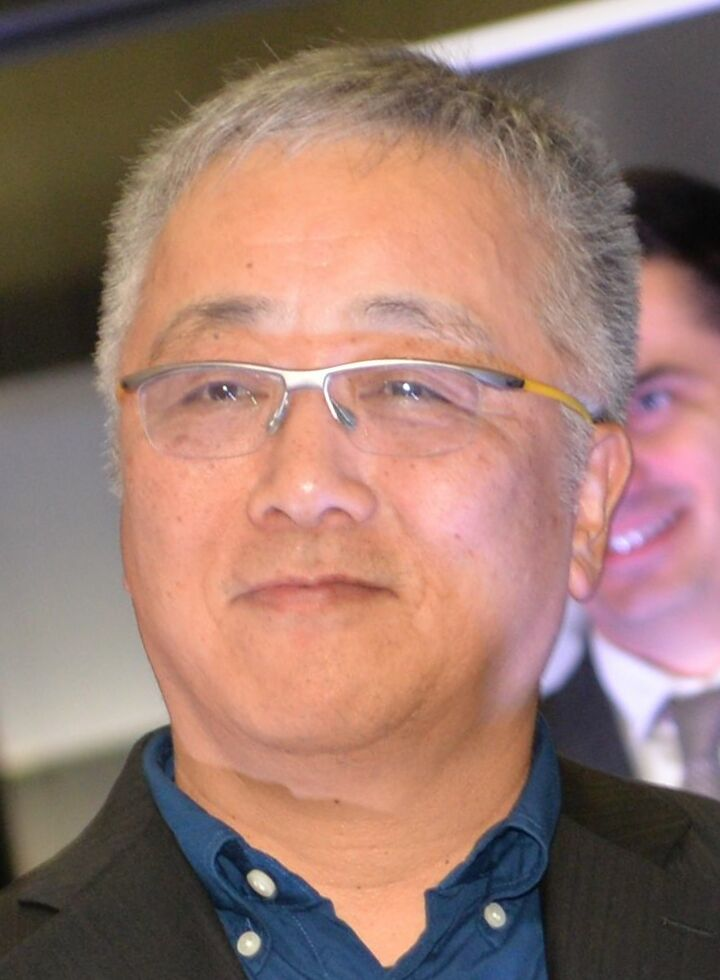
Katsuhiro Otomo in 2016

Tetsuo Shima was created by Akira manga author Katsuhiro Otomo. The character names Tetsuo and Kaneda, and the Espers' codenames of Nos. 25–28, were taken from Tetsujin 28-go. Tetsuo is named after Shikishima's son Tetsuo Shikishima. He struggled with the scene where Kaneda punches Tetsuo. There are not many scenes where the main characters fight barehanded, so Otomo wanted to make it into an impressive scene. Otomo did not want it to be "too cool", and also wanted to add some variety to the rhythm of the frames. When the series was serialized in a magazine, and Otomo saw the finished magazine version, he was not happy with the result, instead revising it for the book release.

Nozomu Sasaki voices Tetsuo in Japanese. During the release of the film, Sasaki had made his debut and so was essentially a novice navigating the audition process. However, he was moved by Mitsuo Iwata's work since his childhood and followed him back, making their meeting and fellow actors in Akira grateful. For the movie, they used a method called 'pre-scoring,' where the voices are recorded first." Iwata added, "What was interesting was that we were given the script and storyboards beforehand. It was a luxury to work from Otomo-san's own storyboards; we would use them to visualize the scenes while performing and recording the dialogue. Because we recorded in stages with breaks in between, the process moved at a snail's pace—taking over a year to complete."

For the original English dub of the Akira movie, Kaneda was voiced by Jan Rabson. Joshua Seth replaced him for the next dub.

== Reception ==
In "This Week in Anime The Prophetic Visions of Cyberpunk Anime", writers from Anime News Network described Tetsuo as the makes "Angry Young Man who has been failed by every link in the chain, and who, once given a taste of power, becomes the architect of his and the city's demise." They further compared as a modern man who suffers in the social media and acts like a foil to Kaneda as a result of lacking masculinity, bravery, confidence, among other traits that make his friend more heroic. During the film's climax, Kaneda wears a red cape as a symbolic way of showing masculinity when obtaining his powers. However, when Tetsuo loses control of his newfound powers, his body mutates, showing his true form of a baby-like individual.

Writers have also emphasized the film's focus on youth alienation. The main characters are shown as disconnected from family structures, education, and political power, with Tetsuo's transformation often described as the result of resentment and social exclusion rather than deliberate villainy. Napier identifies Akira as part of a broader trend in Japanese fiction that centers on disaffected youth in post-industrial cities. In Anime from Akira to Princess Mononoke, Napier further describes the film's young characters as emblematic of generational tension in late-20th-century Japan, where young people are depicted as both victims and sources of disruption. This idea is also discussed in Robot Ghosts and Wired Dreams, which places Akira within a tradition of Japanese science fiction that links bodily mutation to fears about technology and modernity.

Kaneda and his gang refer to the bōsōzoku counterculture. In "Images de la désobéissance dans l’animé : révolte et résistance des images dans Akira de Katsuhiro Otomo (1988)", Pruvost-Delaspre Marie said they are young rebels who challenge the established order by organizing illegal races in the streets of Neo-Tokyo, adopting an appearance out of step with their time. They display extreme violence, both towards rival gangs and authorities, thus expressing a deep social anger. This group of adolescents, without parental figures or reference points, embodies a youth left to its own devices, marginalized and disillusioned. Their revolt is "visceral" and reflects a rejection, even a rupture, with the society that has abandoned them.

In the book "Child and Youth Agency in Science Fiction: Travel, Technology, Time", Jessica Clark noticed the characters represent modern rebellious youth who are always on bikes. The bikers were compared to yakuza and described as a threat to society and profitability of the Japanese state. However, the close bond between Kaneda and Tetsuo serves as a major focus in the narrative where the latter's criminal actions result in the former wanting revenge and becoming a heroic figure. Despite this antagonistic state, Kaneda tries to save his former friend in his the climax when the power of "Akira" causes Tetsuo to mutate in shock. This gives the community Otomo wrote a strong sense of camaraderie.

=== Cultural impact ===
In the 2001 fighting game The King of Fighters 2001, Eolith created a new character named K9999. K9999 was controversial character who becomes absent after The King of Fighters 2002 due to apparent copyright violation as most of his design and powers are borrowed from the character Tetsuo. Tetsuo’s voice actor, Nozomu Sasaki, was also hired to voice K9999 in the game. Kotaku noticed not only SNK stopped using the character since The King of Fighters 2002 but the gallery mode from The King of Fighters XIV avoided any sort of artwork involving him, TheGamer saw him as one of the most overpowered psychics in gaming based on his special moves which Tetsuo also displays in Akira when fighting, making himself a highly competent fighter.

With the eventual release of The King of Fighters XV, Devin Ellis Friend from ScreenRant said that SNK confirmed the new character Krohnen was K9999 based on an ending sequence in which Angel calls Krohnen by his former name resulting in an article called "King Of Fighters 15 Brings Back A Character Missing For 20 Years". However, Friend could not confirm if SNK did this to avoid copyright issues with Toho and instead theorized the reasons for such character changing his name and design to stay away from the Tetsuo expy. He compared this change in character to how Toei created two sequels to the famous anime Dragon Ball Z: Dragon Ball GT and Dragon Ball Super and only prioritized the latter to be the canonical sequel to the first anime. Friend still said Krohnen still shares traits from K9999 like his rude personality, his teamup with Angel and several special moves but believed the truth behind SNK's reasons for such change in the character will remain as a mystery.

Manga author Masakazu Ishiguro based Heavenly Delusion character Michika based on Tetsuo calling that type of people unreasonable troublemakers who do not listen to reason he originally did not like, citing Vegeta from Dragon Ball as another similar type. Despite admitting he did not like these of characters, he believes he might have grown fond of these individuals.
