= K9999 =

Fictional video game character

- The King of Fighters character
- K9999 (left) by Nona and Krohnen McDougall by Tomohiro Nakata
- First game: The King of Fighters 2001 (2001)
- Voiced by: Nozomu Sasaki (KOF 2001–2002), Kenn (KOF XV onwards)

K9999 (pronounced Kay Four-Nine) is a fictional character from SNK's fighting games The King of Fighters. He is a hotheaded, psychopathic member of the NESTS organization who debuted in The King of Fighters 2001. He would later be re-introduced in The King of Fighters XV as Krohnen McDougall (クローネン・マクドガル, Kurōnen Makudogaru). The 9999th clone of Kyo Kusanagi, he has pyrokinetic abilities and is able to transform his arm into a long-deformed flesh tentacle. He has an intense hatred towards K' and despises everyone around him. Despite this, he considers Ángel as a friend. In KOF XV, he returns as the leader of Team Krohnen alongside Kula Diamond and Ángel.

K9999 is heavily based on Tetsuo Shima, a character from Katsuhiro Otomo's manga Akira. Due to copyright issues, K9999 was removed from The King of Fighters 2002: Unlimited Match in 2009; he was replaced by a new character called Nameless. After twenty years of his absence, K9999 was added to The King of Fighters XV with a major redesign as claimed by artist Eisuke Ogura. He was originally voiced by Nozomu Sasaki who was replaced by Kenn. In the story, K9999 written to be the inferior rival of the NESTS arc protagonist K' as the writer Akihiko Ureshino claimed the staff wanted to a different take from Kyo and Iori Yagami from the Orochi arc who see each other as equals.

Critical response to K9999 was initially positive but the removal from several games led to theories about the company committing several copyright violations, making it impossible for him to return. With KOF XV there were initially multiple theories about Krohnen's identity based on his similarities with K9999 until the release of the game which confirmed they are the same character but under a different name. Krohen earned a favorable response too based on his design and gameplay despite still being like the original.

== Appearances ==
K9999 was first introduced in The King of Fighters 2001 as the last experiment the terrorist organization NESTS made based on the fighter Kyo Kusanagi. During the new tournament held by NESTS, the organization starts falling apart after the death of agent Zero. The NESTS team with Ángel and K9999 attack their allies Kula Diamond and Foxy, but depending on the characters used, the rebellious K' interrupts them. Following Igniz' suicide, K9999 and Ángel leave the organization. The two characters return in The King of Fighters 2002 as part of another NESTS team but the game offers no narrative. In The King of Fighters XV, he goes by the name Krohnen McDougall and alongside Ángel, he kidnaps Kula to have exchange of money. In the aftermath, they return Kula to her caretakers but still decide to continue travelling the two together with Ángel telling Krohnen he is still the old K9999. His role in The King of Fighters 2001 is also retold in Akihiko Ureshino's two novelizations based on the game.

== Conception and development ==
K9999 was based on Tetsuo from Katsuhiro Otomo's work Akira. In remembering the character, developers from SNK said that K9999 was a character they found difficult to talk about based on his controversial origins. While acknowledging the character had become popular in China and Korea, they had poor faith in addressing him again in the future in The King of Fighters series.

Writer Akihiko Ureshino said K9999 is a bundle of homages—appearance, voice acting, and presentation—that seems dangerous to mention. While this tends to be the focus, his position was more of a stepping stone for NESTS arc protagonist K' than a rival. This is probably because, according to the setting, K9999 was assigned this clown role by his superior Igniz. K9999 was written to hate being K' who only seems as a troublesome person. He contrasted this inferiority complex with the more famous SNK rivalry between Kyo Kusanagi and Iori Yagami started in the Orochi arc as they instead see each other as equals. The handling of this state constantly irritates K9999 in a distorted way, but ultimately, this was all part of Ignis's test on K'. K9999 didn't appear on the main stage at all until his reappearance as Kronen in The King of Fighters XV but K' probably didn't feel anything about it as reflected on their rival intro. K9999, who was supposedly created as a clone in the NESTS lab, should have no connection to K' whatsoever. Nevertheless, the reason K9999 is so conscious of K' is because the people at NESTS value K', who is supposed to be a traitor, more highly than K9999, who is an imperfect clone soldier. Ureshino took into acount this when writing his novelizations based on the games.

In 2016, Yasuyuki Oda said that SNK might reexplore K9999 and Ángel again as it had been several years after their last appearance. When discussing the release of the character in The King of Fighters XV Eisuke Ogura said that Krohnen is really a former NESTS experiment who had his hair grown up and had his body replaced with an armor and a glove to. Ogura wanted Kronhen to look powerful in his new design.

== Critical reception ==
K9999 was a controversial character who becomes absent after The King of Fighters 2002 due to apparent copyright violation as most of his design and powers are borrowed from the character Tetsuo from the 1988 film Akira. Tetsuo’s voice actor, Nozomu Sasaki, was also hired to voice K9999 in the game. Kotaku noticed not only SNK stopped using the character since The King of Fighters 2002 but the gallery mode from The King of Fighters XIV avoided any sort of artwork involving him, TheGamer saw him as one of the most overpowered psychics in gaming based on his special moves which Tetsuo also displays in Akira when fighting, making himself a highly competent fighter. Although he appeared in The King of Fighters 2002, a new character called Nameless was designed to take his place in the remake The King of Fighters 2002 Unlimited Match. According to Den of Geek, SNK did not replace K9999 with Nameless due to copyright violations but instead because they hated the character and criticized the redundancy of a character being a copy of another copy. On a side note, they still found K9999 more appealing than Nameless. Nameless was created by novelist Akihiko Ureshino who gave his setting to artist Hiroaki Hashimoto to use him in the game.

Meanwhile, when Krohnen was first revealed in promotions for The King of Fighters XV, multiple writers acknowledged similarities with K9999. Kotaku commented the two shared the same blue hair and clothing with similar colors but were not sure if it was a clone, a relative or the same person in disguise. Upon his reveal in a demo, Siliconera said that while he appears to be a new character, he looks a lot like K9999. Chris Moyse from Destructoid noticed the narrative treats him as a biker rebel, something that many gamers would be reminded of K9999 as Tetsuo also shared similar traits. Although SNK did not confirm his identity, artist Hiroaki Hashimoto who used to work at SNK was more open about it, calling him the revival of K9999.

With the eventual release of The King of Fighters XV, Devin Ellis Friend from ScreenRant said that SNK confirmed Krohnen was K9999 based on an ending sequence in which Ángel calls Krohnen by his former name resulting in an article called "King Of Fighters 15 Brings Back A Character Missing For 20 Years". However, Friend could not confirm if SNK did this to avoid copyright issues with Toho and instead theorized the reasons for such character changing his name and design to stay away from the Tetsuo expy. He compared this change in character to how Toei created two sequels to the famous anime Dragon Ball Z: Dragon Ball GT and Dragon Ball Super and only prioritized the latter to be the canonical sequel to the first anime. Friend still said Krohnen still shares traits from K9999 like his rude personality, his teamup with Ángel and several special moves but believed the truth behind SNK's reasons for such change in the character will remain as a mystery. Tristan Jurkovich from GameRant regarded Krohnen as the second strongest character in The King of Fighters XV due to his special moves and still pointed his similarities with Tetsuo with Kronhen standing out because of his cybernetic arm. Redbull gave Krohnen an "honorable" when listing the best fighting game characters in recent years.
