= Shotaro Kaneda =

- Akira character
- Shotaro Kaneda, as illustrated by Katsuhiro Otomo
- First appearance: Akira: "Tetsuo" (1982)
- Created by: Katsuhiro Otomo
- Voiced by: Japanese: Mitsuo Iwata; English: Cam Clarke (Electric Media/Streamline dub); Johnny Yong Bosch (Animaze/Pioneer dub)

Shotaro Kaneda (Japanese: 金田 正太郎, Hepburn: Kaneda Shōtarō) is the main protagonist of the manga series Akira, written by Katsuhiro Otomo. He is an antiheroic, brash, carefree delinquent and the leader of a motorcycle gang. Kaneda is best friends with Tetsuo Shima, a member who he has known since childhood, but their friendship was ruined after Tetsuo gained and abused his psychic powers. He becomes involved with the terrorist resistance movement and forms an attraction for their member Kei, which eventually develops into a strong romantic bond between the two. Kaneda eventually takes it upon himself to fight Tetsuo before he continues killing other people.

Inspired by Tetsujin 28-go, Otomo created Kaneda's characterization based on his own youth. Otomo drew his fight scenes with a gun and bike carefully to avoid making him look too cool. The character was voiced by Mitsuo Iwata in Japanese while Cam Clarke and Johnny Yong Bosch replaced him for the two English dubs.

Despite mixed commentary about Kaneda's antagonistic relationship with Tetsuo, his role in the story was praised for irony of a delinquent becoming a hero the world needs. His character was the subject of studies by several writers about how he represents the bōsōzoku counterculture involving criminal youth who still managed a strong connection as represented in the movie's climax when the two enemies try to save each other. Kaneda's bike and actions with it became one of the most iconic scenes in anime history which resulted in references in other works.

== Creation ==
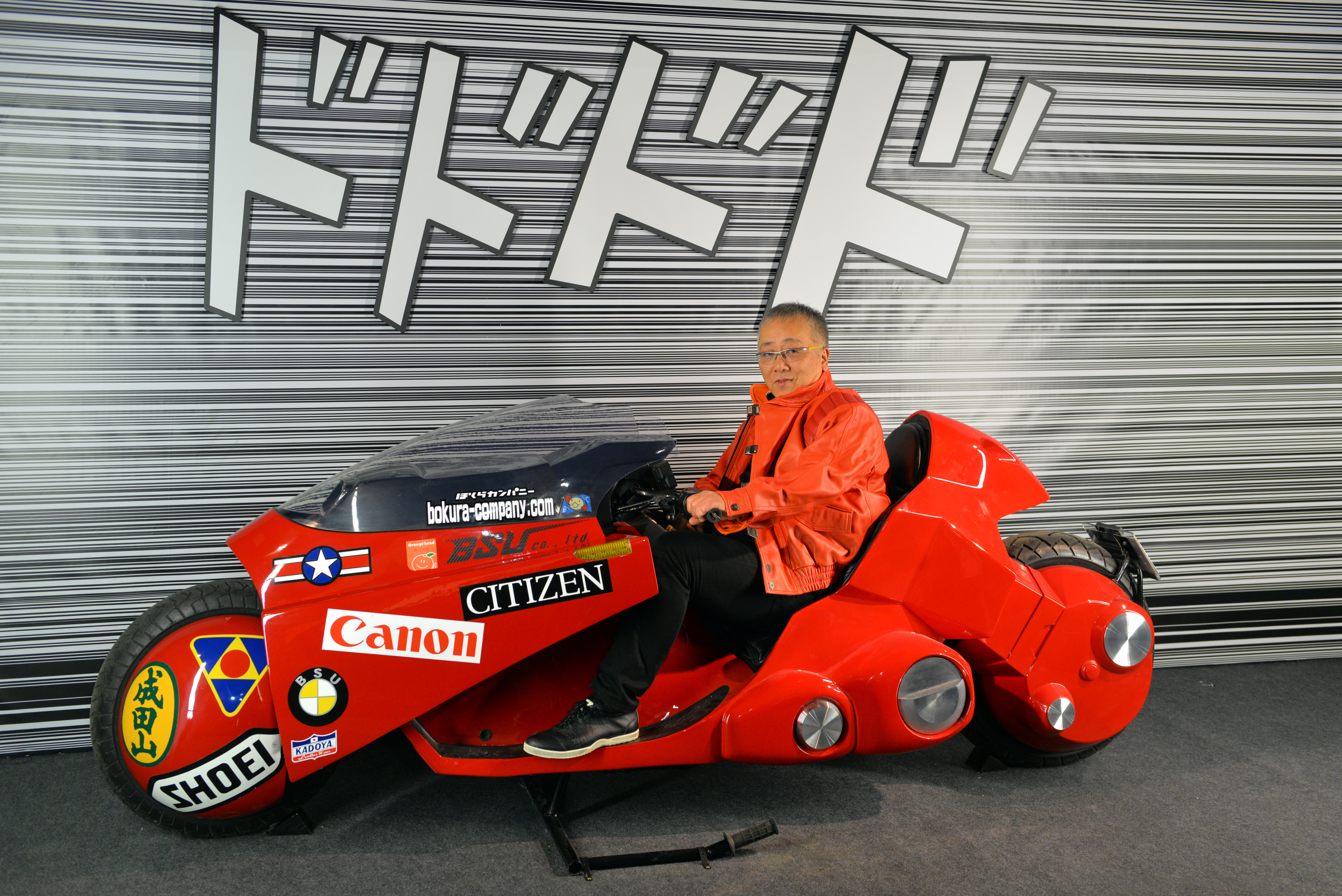
Otomo posing on a replica of the futuristic motorcycle driven by Kaneda in Akira (2016)

Katsuhiro Otomo drew several sketches of Shotaro Kaneda before the manga Akira went into production, already settling on the idea that the main character would be a boy, so he drew it thinking that this wouldn't be a challenging. Both Kaneda and his friend Tetsuo were based on Katsuhiro Otomo's youth, which allowed Otomo to not think too deeply about them when writing the manga, and simply project his own memories onto the characters. The character names, Tetsuo and Kaneda, as well as the Espers' codenames of Nos. 25–28, were taken from Tetsujin 28-go.

When illustrating the series, Otomo set up Kaneda to be cool in a way that fitted the narrative but without feeling forced. He struggled with the scene where Kaneda punches Tetsuo. There are not many scenes where the main characters fight barehanded, so Otomo wanted to make it into an impressive scene. Otomo did not want it to be "too cool", and also wanted to add some variety to the rhythm of the frames. When the series was serialized in a magazine, and Otomo saw the finished magazine version, he was not happy with the result, instead revising it for the book release. Kaneda's iconic motorcycle from the manga had no specific design, with Otomo saying it came out "kind of random" and changed every time he drew it, though he cited Syd Mead's lightcycles from Tron as inspiration. When he draws it himself, it always ends up looking sloppy. Kaneda's fight scenes with the bike were aimed to make it cool.

=== Casting ===
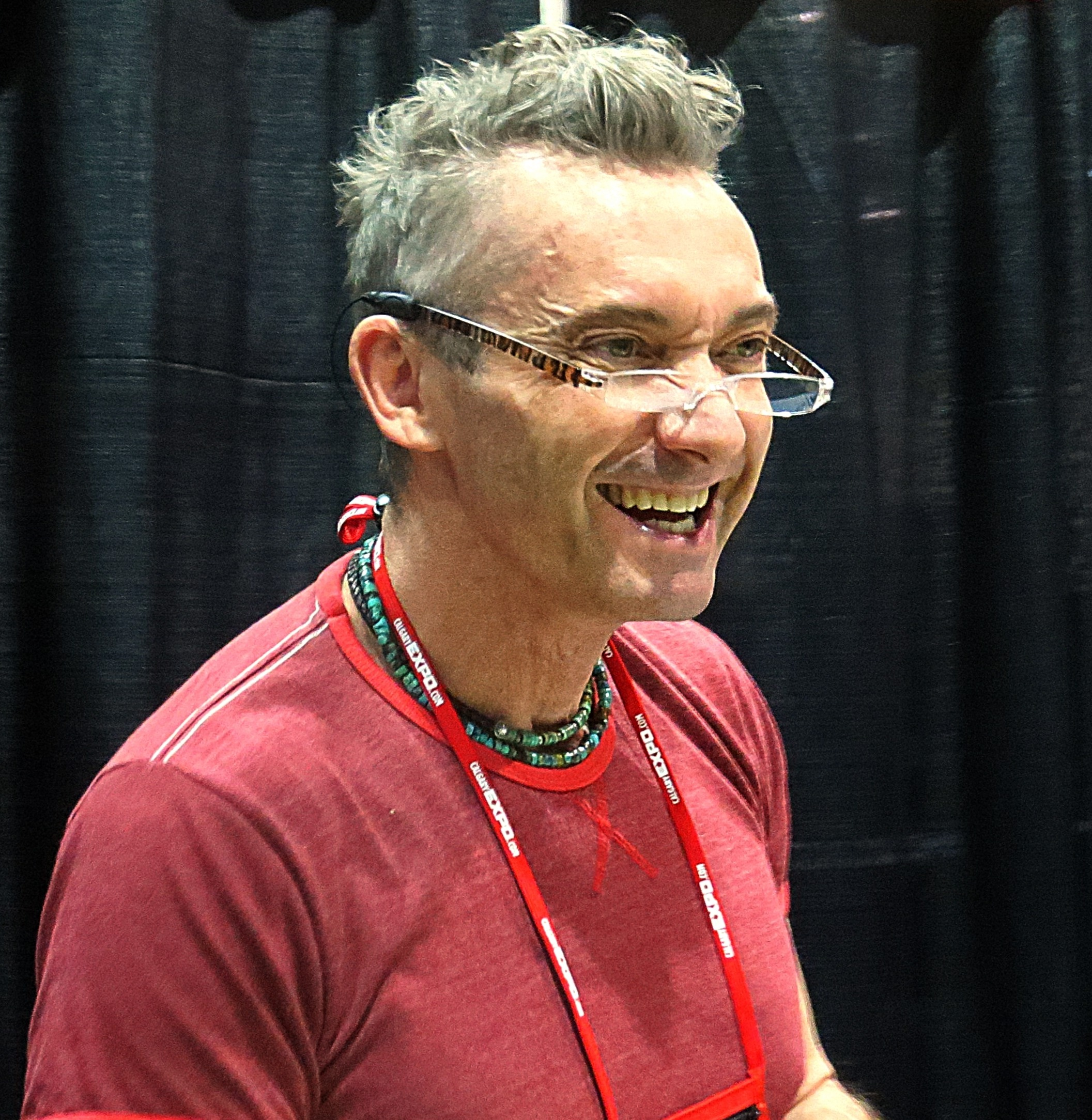
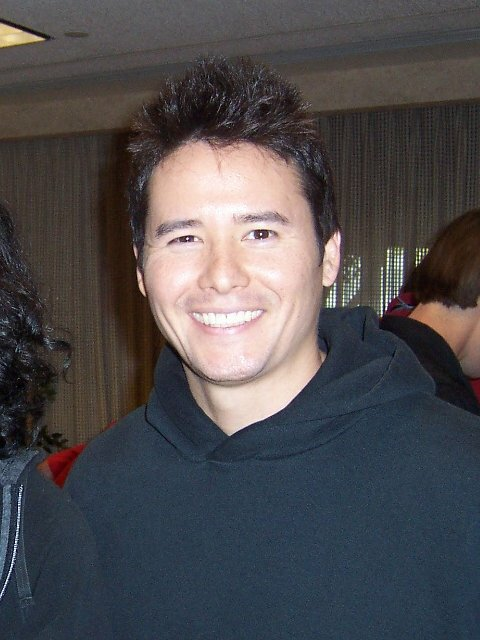
Cam Clarke and Johnny Yong Bosch (left to right) voiced Kaneda in the first and second English dub of the film, respectively.

In the film, Kaneda is voiced by Mitsuo Iwata. He loved Otomo's manga and would always buy and read the magazine in which it was serialized. So when the children's theater troupe he was a member of at the time contacted him about an audition, Iwata strongly believed he might get to meet Otomo. Iwata looked back on the time of production there were three rounds of auditions, and he met Nozomu Sasaki for the first time in the third round. When he heard Sasaki's voice for the first time, he instantly thought he was perfect for Tetsuo. Iwata had a long career that began as a child actor, and had seen his success which impressed Iwata. They for over a year.

For the English dubbing, he was first portrayed by and then by Cam Clarke in the first dub and Johnny Yong Bosch in the second. Akira was one of the first anime films Bosch ever saw which stood out from Western works, especially because of its dark story.

== Role in Akira ==
Kaneda becomes involved with Kei, a member of a terrorist organization that stages anti-government attacks. Led by Ryusaku and opposition Diet leader Nezu, the terrorists get wind of the Colonel's project and a mysterious figure connected with it known as "Akira." When Tetsuo and the Clowns begin a violent citywide turf war, Kaneda instigates a counter-attack that unites all of Neo-Tokyo's biker gangs against Tetsuo. While the Clown Gang is easily defeated, Tetsuo's psionic powers make him virtually invincible. After confronting the JSDF, Kaneda, Kei, and Tetsuo are taken into military custody. Tetsuo enters the secret military base at the Olympic site the following day, killing many soldiers. Kaneda and Kei enter the site through the sewers and witness the unfolding situation.

They come across Akira outside the base. Vaguely aware of who he is, they take him back into Neo-Tokyo. Both the Colonel's soldiers and the followers of an Esper named Lady Miyako begin scouring Neo-Tokyo in search of him. Kaneda, Kei, and a third terrorist, Chiyoko, attempt to find refuge with Akira on Nezu's yacht. However, Nezu betrays them and kidnaps Akira for his use. They survive the attempt and manage to snatch Akira from Nezu's mansion. Kaneda is reunited with Kei and joins Kai and Joker, the former Clown leader, in planning an assault on the Great Tokyo Empire. Meanwhile, an international team of scientists meets up on an American aircraft carrier to study the recent psychic events in Neo-Tokyo, forming Project Juvenile A. Ryu has a falling out with Yamada after learning that he plans to use biological weapons to assassinate Tetsuo and Akira; Yamada later meets up with his arriving commando team. Kaneda, Kai, Joker, and their small army of bikers arrive at the Olympic Stadium to begin their all-out assault on the Great Tokyo Empire.

As Kaneda and the bikers launch their assault on the stadium, Tetsuo returns from his battle with Kei. Kaneda and his friends appear to fight Tetsuo once more, but his powers transform him into a monstrous, amoeba-like mass resembling a fetus, absorbing everything near him. Kei's attack awakens Tetsuo's full powers, triggering a psychic reaction similar to Akira's. They are also able to free Kaneda, who was trapped in Tetsuo's mass. He witnesses the truth about the Espers' power as they, alongside Akira and Tetsuo, ascend to a higher plane of existence. The United Nations sends peacekeeping forces to help the surviving parties of Neo-Tokyo. Kaneda and his friends confront them, declaring the city's sovereignty as the Great Tokyo Empire and warning them that Akira still lives. Kaneda and Kei meet up with the Colonel and part ways as friends. As Kaneda and Kei ride through Neo-Tokyo with their followers, they are joined by ghostly visions of Tetsuo and Yamagata.

A video game, simply titled Akira, based on the animated film was released on December 24, 1988. The game has the player in the role of Kaneda, with the storyline starting with Kaneda and his motorcycle gang in police custody.

== Reception ==
=== Critical response ===
Critical response to Kaneda's character was positive. He is ranked as #11 on IGN's Top 25 Anime Characters of All Time list. Katherine Dacey of MangaBookshelf observed how Tetsuo and Kaneda seem like real teenage boys in the manga, not generic action figures like in the film's "grossly" simplified depiction of their relationship. On the other hand, Amy McNulty from Anime News Network criticized Kaneda and Tetsuo's relationship for being always antagonistic despite how the plot tries to mark them as childhood friends and criticized Kaneda's characterization as "flat". Rebecca Silverman from the same site still praised the irony of rebellious Kaneda being a hero, describing it as "a perfect example of carnivalism in how it inverts the expectations". Nevertheless, all the journalists praised how Otomo draws Kaneda in each panel, especially when he is driving his bike. When comparing manga and film, Mark Pellegrini of AIPT Comics felt Kaneda was rougher in the former work due to his violent attitude towards Takashi in the first volume as well a bigger womanizer, fitting more the dark story.

In "This Week in Anime The Prophetic Visions of Cyberpunk Anime", writers from Anime News Network described Tetsuo as the makes "Angry Young Man who has been failed by every link in the chain, and who, once given a taste of power, becomes the architect of his and the city's demise." They further compared as a modern man who suffers in the social media and acts like a foil to Kaneda as a result of lacking masculinity, bravery, confidence, among other traits that make his friend more heroic. During the film's climax, Kaneda wears a red cape as a symbolic way of showing masculinity when obtaining his powers. However, when Tetsuo loses control of his newfound powers, his body mutates, showing his true form of a baby-like individual.

=== Cultural impact ===
The "Akira slide" refers to a scene where Kaneda slides into view on his motorbike, as he uses a sideways slide to bring his bike to a halt creating a trail of smoke and electric sparks. It is regarded as one of the most iconic anime scenes of all time, widely imitated and referred to in many works of animation, film, television, and video games. Kaneda's motorbike appears in Steven Spielberg's film Ready Player One, and CD Projekt's video game Cyberpunk 2077. Upon seeing a poster for the animated film Akira, Masashi Kishimoto became fascinated with the way the illustration was made and wished to imitate the series' creator Otomo's style.

Bartkira, a fan-made web comic parody of Akira created by Ryan Humphrey, is a panel-for-panel retelling of all six volumes of the manga illustrated by numerous artists, with Otomo's characters being portrayed by characters from the The Simpsons. Kaneda is represented by Bart Simpson, Milhouse Van Houten replaces Tetsuo, and Kei and Colonel Shikishima are portrayed by Laura Powers and Principal Skinner respectively. The King of Fighters originally had a protagonist named Syo Kirishima who was highly influenced by Kaneda. Although the designers changed Syo into Kyo Kusanagi for the final product, Syo returns in The King of Fighters 2000 as an assist character with Mitsuo Iwata voicing him. In The King of Fighters 2002 a clone of Kyo named Kusanagi was created as antagonist with Iwata also voicing gun, often referencing Kaneda in some of his lines as fellow character K9999 is based on Tetsuo.

In the original plans for the 2020 Tokyo Olympics and Paralympics Opening Ceremony, Akira was to be featured in order to appeal to Japan's "soft power" among younger generation. The original plans featured Kaneda riding into stadium on his motorcycle. As Japan scholar Tagsold noticed, there is an inherent irony in the use of Akira to promote the 2020 Olympics. The original manga contains strong anti-Olympic sentiment and contains several references to the 1964 Olympics, and in the story the Olympics are also scheduled to be held in Tokyo in 2020, where they are to symbolize Japan's rebirth and recovery from a nuclear disaster that takes place in the 1980s in the story setting. Tagsold notes, "By referencing the 1964 Games, Ōtomo paints a highly critical image of the first Tokyo Olympics, reflecting the mood of the early 1980s, when citizens vehemently opposed plans to host the Olympics in Nagoya."

=== Analysis ===
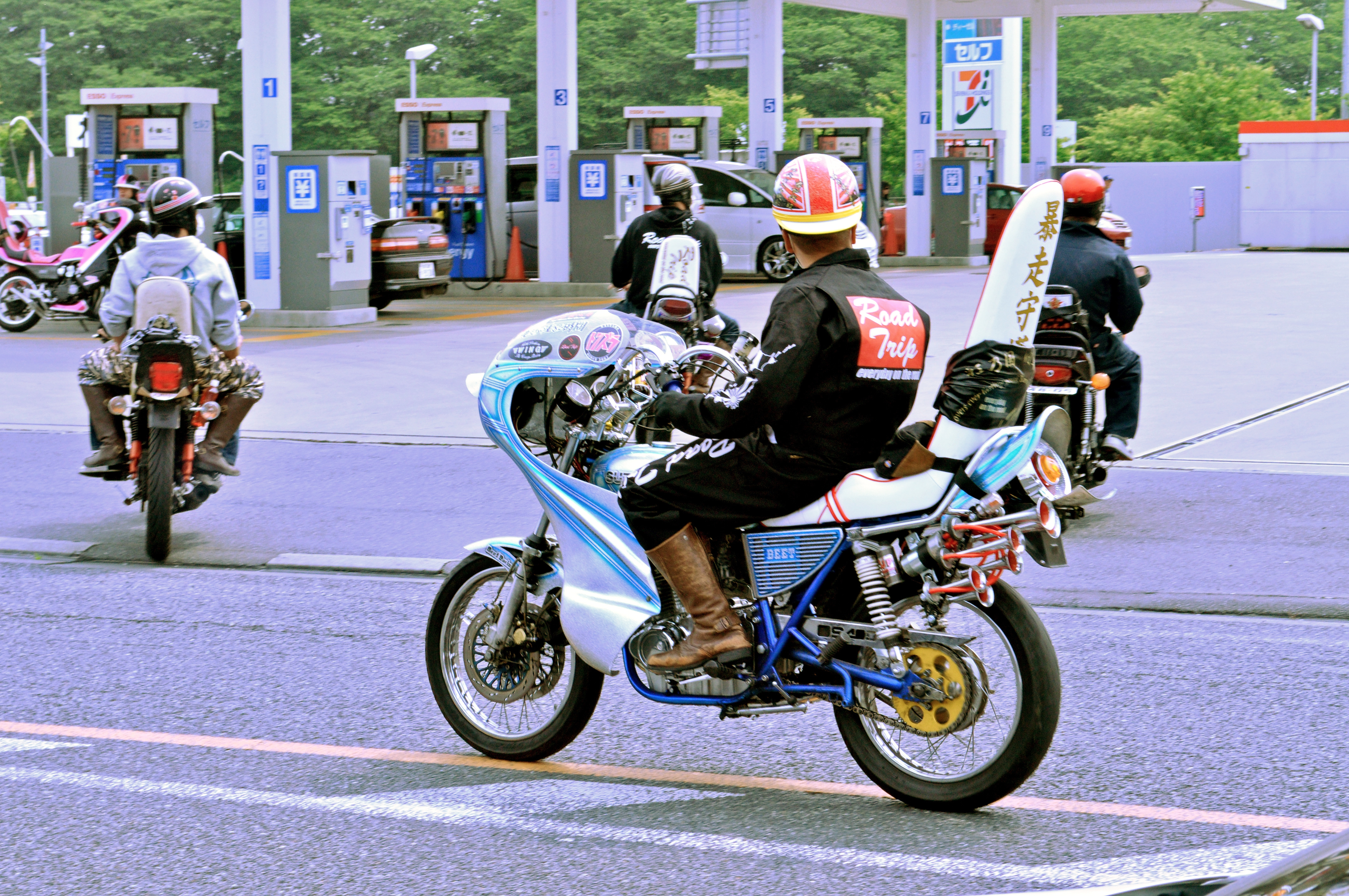
A group of bōsōzoku in 2013

The protagonist was also the subject of studies. Kaneda and his gang refer to the bōsōzoku counterculture. In "Images de la désobéissance dans l’animé : révolte et résistance des images dans Akira de Katsuhiro Otomo (1988)", Pruvost-Delaspre Marie said they are young rebels who challenge the established order by organizing illegal races in the streets of Neo-Tokyo, adopting an appearance out of step with their time. They display extreme violence, both towards rival gangs and authorities, thus expressing a deep social anger. This group of adolescents, without parental figures or reference points, embodies a youth left to its own devices, marginalized and disillusioned. Their revolt is "visceral" and reflects a rejection, even a rupture, with the society that has abandoned them.

According to Scifi Dimensions, the disobedience is as much a refusal of authority as a cry of distress in the face of a post-apocalyptic world where institutions have lost all legitimacy. Their rebellious behavior then symbolizes a form of resistance - violent, certainly, but carrying a desire for change. According to Jean-Marie Bouissou from Critique internationale, Kaneda's famous red motorcycle, which has become an icon of the film, represents this quest for freedom in the face of a Japanese society perceived as rigid and oppressive.

In the book "Child and Youth Agency in Science Fiction: Travel, Technology, Time", Jessica Clark noticed the characters represent modern rebellious youth who are always on bikes. The bikers were compared to yakuza and described as a threat to society and profitability of the Japanese state. However, the close bond between Kaneda and Tetsuo serves as a major focus in the narrative where the latter's criminal actions result in the former wanting revenge and becoming a heroic figure. Despite this antagonistic state, Kaneda tries to save his former friend in his the climax when the power of "Akira" causes Tetsuo to mutate in shock. This gives the community Otomo wrote a strong sense of camaraderie.
