= From Impressionism to Anime =

2007 book by Susan J. Napier

From Impressionism to Anime: Japan as Fantasy and Fan Cult in the Mind of the West
- Cover of book
- Author: Susan J. Napier
- Language: English
- Subject: Japonisme, anime
- Publisher: Palgrave Macmillan
- Publication date: 2007
- Publication place: United States
- Media type: Print (paperback)
- Pages: 258 pp (first edition)
- ISBN: 1-4039-6214-6

From Impressionism to Anime: Japan as Fantasy and Fan Cult in the Mind of the West is a scholarly book by Susan J. Napier, published in 2007 by Palgrave Macmillan. It connects Japanophilia, Orientalism, Japonisme, and the modern anime and manga fandom.

== Reception ==
Anime News Network's Mikhail Koulikov commends the book for making "interesting but logical assertions about the reasons behind the popularity of anime in America. Claims and inferences are well supported by both specific examples and references". However, he criticizes the book for "too much reliance on interviews raises issues of ignoring other viewpoints". Rayna Denison from the University of East Anglia, writing for Participations, comments that Napier's "account is more epochal than holistic, and its account of Japanese-Western engagements is one more concerned with French, American and some British points of contact, rather than with mapping a full history of Japanese-Western relationships".
