= The King of Fighters 2002 Unlimited Match =

2009 video game

The King of Fighters 2002: Unlimited Match
- Arcade flyer
- Developer: SNK Playmore
- Publisher: SNK Playmore
- Director: Saru
- Producer: Motonori Tsujimura
- Designer: R. Ishizuka
- Programmer: Kenshi Naruse
- Artist: Hiroaki Hashimoto
- Series: The King of Fighters
- Platforms: PlayStation 2; Arcade; Xbox 360; Windows; PlayStation 4
- Release: February 26, 2009: PlayStation 2; JP: February 26, 2009 Arcade; JP: July 9, 2009 Xbox 360; WW: November 3, 2010 Windows; WW: February 27, 2015 PlayStation 4; WW: February 9, 2021
- Genre: Fighting
- Modes: Single-player, multiplayer
- Arcade system: System Board Y2

The King of Fighters 2002: Unlimited Match (Note: Japanese: ザ・キング・オブ・ファイターズ2002 アンリミテッドマッチ) is a 2009 fighting video game developed and published by SNK Playmore for arcades. It is a remake of 2002 video game The King of Fighters 2002, the ninth main game in The King of Fighters series. The game was initially ported to the PlayStation 2 only in Japan, and later internationally to the Xbox 360 in 2010, Windows in 2015, and the PlayStation 4 in 2021. Similar to other games, the player is given the option to create teams composed of three fighters to fight against each other or the AI in arcade mode and challenge mode which helps to unlock multiple bosses from previous SNK games based on the player's performance.

SNK aimed to introduce more drastic changes than they had in The King of Fighters '98 Ultimate Match, which was relatively faithful to the original The King of Fighters '98. Unlimited Match features new characters, bringing the roster to 66 characters in total, making it the series' largest roster to date. New stages, music and artwork were supplemented, with system and roster rebalancing in the gameplay. The game features a unique character known Nameless who replaces K9999 as one of the playable characters and boss characters.

The game was well received its large amount of characters and modes though some video game journalists found it challenging to use. The modern ports were also praised for featuring a suitable online mode to challenge other gamers.

== Content ==
Similar to its original version, Unlimited Match is a 2D fighting game that gives the player the power to create a team composed of three characters to face the A.I. or other players. Each character is able to perform their own special moves, combos and Desperation Moves. Upon reaching the highest level of energy, the character can perform a stronger techniques. An online mode to play against other players is also available.

Unlimited Match has 66 characters in total, making it the series' largest roster to date. There are 44 characters from The King of Fighters 2002, 16 characters from the NESTS arc, including King and Shingo, and six hidden characters, including additional characters from the previous console versions with the exception of Orochi Iori and particularly K9999. A new character called Nameless (ネームレス) was designed to take his place in the game.

Depending on the player's performance in arcade, the game will challenge him with a determines midboss: the NESTS experiments Nameless, Angel, Kula Diamond, Kyo 1, Kyo 2 and Kusanagi. Upon reaching the arcade's end, the game offers the NESTS bosses Krizalid, Zero, Zero Original or Igniz. An extra boss, Omega Rugal, can be fought after the NESTS bosses. Meanwhile, in challenge mode, the player can fight Goenitz from The King of Fighters '96, Geese Howard from Real Bout Fatal Fury and the enhanced Nightmare Geese from Real Bout Fatal Fury Special.

== Development ==
A comparison of Kyo Kusanagi's strongest move between The King of Fighters 2002 (left) and the remake.

Much of the game's content was revealed at Tokyo Game Show 2008. A game designer under the nickname of "Dr Neo Geo" was behind most of the content. The game was developed at the same time as The King of Fighters XII but rather than imitate its content, SNK wanted to remake The King of Fighters 2002 similar to how they previously did with The King of Fighters '98. Hiroaki Hashimoto was behind the main art. Among major improvements, MAX2 feature, were been enhanced not only in terms of moves but also in its presentation. The most significant system changes in this game are "MAX2" and "Anywhere Cancel." These changes were done due to issues in the original The King of Fighters 2002.

Nameless was created by novelist Akihiko Ureshino, with artist Hiroaki Hashimoto designing his visual appearance. In contrast to the The King of Fighters '98 remake which tried emulating the original's feel, Unlimited Match had most of the visual content remade including character select screen and menus. Each boss character was given a new move, MAX2, and Clone Zero, Original Zero, and Ignis received newly added "crouching" graphics that didn't exist in their original games. Furthermore, based on feedback from "Ultimate Match" players, SNK differentiated the attack and defense power between player characters and CPU characters. Please try these differences out in the retail version. In regards to returning characters, Kyo Kusanagi from The King of Fighters '99 was brought back as an alternate character based on gameplay differences with following installments from the NESTS arc.

The team prepared secret versions of Robert Garcia, Sie Kensou, and Takuma Sakazaki as hidden characters. SNK initially decided a system similar to May Lee's mode change, where players could switch between the KOF2000 version and the KOF2002 version by pressing buttons simultaneously. Ultimately, after further adjustments, they decided to create them as separate secret versions, but the developer thinks a switchable version would have offered some interesting strategic possibilities. They also considered secret versions for Lin and Yuri which were scrapped. Similar to Leona Heidern's awakening, there was also a proposal to have Iori Yagami transform into Riot of the Blood via command, which was scrapped due to the character's lack of self control during the transformation making it irrelevant to the gameplay.

== Release ==
The King of Fighters 2002 Unlimited Match was released on February 26, 2009 for the PlayStation 2 in Japan, on July 9, 2009 for arcades and on November 3, 2010 for Xbox Live Arcade. The PlayStation 2 version also includes a port of the original The King of Fighters 2002 Neo Geo version. The game was later ported to Steam on February 27, 2015, and PlayStation 4 on February 8, 2021.

In November 2020, the Steam version of the game was updated with rollback netcode, allowing for higher quality online play. The PlayStation 4 version was released with this same rollback netcode. In January 2022, the PC version was patched with spectating lobbies and additional improvements.

== Reception ==
Reception

Aggregate score
Aggregator	Score
OpenCritic	88% recommend

Review scores
Publication	Score
Eurogamer	8/10
IGN	8/10
PALGN	8/10
Wired	8/10
M. Games	85/100
GameZone	7.5/10
MakoReactor	9/10
PC Mag	4/5
PSXBrazil	90/100

=== Sales ===
The game was well received in Japan. During its release week, Unlimited Match sold 19,000 copies in Japan. In Issue 114 from Arcadia, the game was featured at ninth in its Top Ten Video Games list. By 2009, the game reached 28,216 units sold in Japan.

=== Critical response ===
Critical reception to the game's PlayStation 2 port was positive with Eurogamer and PALGN acclaiming large number of playable characters, although mixed opinions were given to its aging graphics. In addition, despite lacking a plot, the large interaction between characters was praised for adding depth to the game according to Wired. While enjoying the gameplay and the balance of the cast despite its large amout, GameZone lamented SNK did not try reincorporating other tag systems they had previously explored in the Ash Saga like the tags. M Games acclaimed how SNK redrew most backgrounds and kept the original Neo Geo game in case players want to use, while seeing Nameless as underpowered based on how easy is to dodge his strongest move. Eurogamer said that while the original game was from 2002, it aged well thanks to its varitety of characters.

The PC port had a 88% recommendation average in OpenCritic. PC Mag He also praised the balanced gameplay and large amount of boss characters that made him call it one of the best ones like Geese Howard who was supposed to be dead as a result of the developers using the "Dream Match" format where no narrative was given. The PC port was praised for the redrawing of the stages as well as the multiple features of gameplay the player can freely practise in the modes the game offers. Ivan Nikolai Barkow Castilho from PSXBrazil said the PC port is benefitted for good rollback netcode, making it almost as good other modern consoles. However, they still acknowledged problems with searching users. While acknowledging the large amount of characters and the balance issues it can bring, Castiho praised the game's large amount of options comparing it to Street Fighter IV. However, he still criticized the difficulties in learning the basics of the games, especially in Challenge leading players to use the internet instead for help. IGN said there may be instances where the opponent's movements are interrupted depending on the network, the input itself becomes identical to local input, leading the entire fighting game scene to prefer the rollback method in recent time. He felt the online mode was so well developed that it surpassed the more modern game The King of Fighters XIV.
