= Geinoh Yamashirogumi =

Japanese musical collective

Geinoh Yamashirogumi (Japanese: 芸能山城組, Hepburn: Geinō Yamashirogumi; lit. 'Yamashiro Entertainment Group') is a Japanese musical collective founded on January 19, 1974 by Tsutomu Ōhashi, consisting of hundreds of people with different occupations.

Geinoh Yamashirogumi logo

They are known for both their re-creations of globally-known folk music, along with music combining traditional and modern elements. Some fusions include an electronic recreation of traditional Indonesian gamelan music, due to MIDI digital synthesizers not being able to handle such tuning systems. Their 1986 album, Ecophony Rinne, introduced these computer-generated sounds. The success of this album brought them to the attention of Katsuhiro Ōtomo, who commissioned them to create the soundtrack of Akira. The soundtrack is built on the concept of recurrent themes or "modules". The soundtrack is a mix of digital synthesizers (Roland D-50 and Yamaha DX7-II, both of which could, by then, be tuned to the Pure-Minor, slendro, and pelog tuning scales), Indonesian bamboo percussion (jegog, etc.), traditional Japanese theatrical and spiritual music (Noh), European classical, and progressive rock.

The group's name uses Ōhashi's pseudonym, Shoji Yamashiro, and translates roughly to "Yamashiro Performing Arts Collective". Ōhashi took his inspiration from a postwar 1950s group of similar characters that lived as a commune.

== Discography ==
=== Studio albums ===
- Osorezan / Do No Kenbai (1976)
- Chi no Hibiki: Geinoh Yamashirogumi Tō-Yōroppa wo Utau (Echo of the Earth) (1976)
- Yamato Gensho (1977)
- Ougonrin Sanyo (Exultant Pisces in Cantics Nostris) (1978)
- Shonentachi Eno Chikyu Sanka (In Praise Of Earth‚ To Boys) (1979)
- Selections From Folk Music On Silkroad (1981)
- Selections From African Folk Music (1982)
- Ecophony Rinne (Samsara Ecophony) (1986)
- Ecophony Gaia (1990)

=== Soundtracks ===
- Symphonic Suite Akira (1988)
- Akira: Original Motion Picture Soundtrack (1988)

=== Remix albums ===
- Akira Remix (2024)

=== Live albums ===
- Geinoh Yamashirogumi Live (1978)

=== Videos ===
- Akira Sound Clip (1991) Laserdisc/DVD Reissue (Making of the soundtrack of the anime)

=== Compilations ===
- Nyumon (1994)

=== Singles ===
- "Theme of Akira" (1988)
