= Tsutomu Ōhashi =

Japanese artist and scientist

Tsutomu Ōhashi (大橋 力, Ōhashi Tsutomu; born March 14, 1933) is a Japanese agricultural scientist, composer, and record producer. He is also known by his pseudonym, Shoji Yamashiro (山城 祥二, Yamashiro Shōji).

== Early life ==
Born in Tochigi Prefecture, he attended Tohoku University and graduated from the Faculty of Agriculture. He received a Doctorate of Agriculture.

== Career ==
He held positions such as Instructor at Tsukuba University, Professor at the National Institute of Multimedia Education, Professor at Chiba Institute of Technology, and General manager at the Department of KANSEI Brain Science, ATR Human Information Processing Research Laboratories.

While he is a composer, conductor, and producer, as a scientist he has interests including environmental science, information science, Kansei engineering, production engineering, molecular biology, artificial life, and anthropology.

In 1974, he founded the Geinoh Yamashirogumi, which is a Japanese musical collective consisting of hundreds of different people, among them journalists, doctors, engineers, students, businessmen, etc. He is also known for composing and conducting the score for the renowned 1988 anime film Akira under his pseudonym, Shoji Yamashiro.

He is the President of the Yamashiro Institute of Science and Culture and the Director and chief researcher of the Foundation for the Advancement of International Science.

== Selected works ==
In a statistical overview derived from writings by and about Tsutomu Ōhashi, OCLC/WorldCat encompasses roughly 10+ works in 10+ publications in 5 languages and 400+ library holdings.

- 群れ創り学 (1981)
- 「仮面考」シンポジウム (1982)
- 情緖ロボットの世界 (1985)
- Symphonic Suite Akira (1988)
- 情報環境学 (1989)
- ピグミ－の脳, 西洋人の脳 : 夢舞亭対話 (1992)
- 音と文明 : 音の環境学ことはじめ (2003)

== See also ==
- Hypersonic effect
