= Ultrasonic hearing =

Auditory effect

Ultrasonic hearing is a recognised auditory effect which allows humans to perceive sounds of a much higher frequency than would ordinarily be audible using the inner ear, usually by stimulation of the base of the cochlea through bone conduction. Normal human hearing is recognised as having an upper bound of 15–28 kHz, depending on the person.

Ultrasonic sinusoids as high as 120 kHz have been reported as successfully perceived. Two competing theories are proposed to explain this effect. The first asserts that ultrasonic sounds excite the inner hair cells of the cochlea basal turn, which are responsive to high frequency sounds. The second proposes that ultrasonic signals resonate the brain and are modulated down to frequencies that the cochlea can then detect.

Researchers Tsutomu Oohashi et al. have coined the term hypersonic effect to describe the results of their controversial study supporting audibility of ultrasonics.

By modulating speech signals onto an ultrasonic carrier, intelligible speech has also been perceived with a high degree of clarity, especially in areas of high ambient noise. Deatherage states that what humans experience as ultrasonic perception may have been a necessary precursor in the evolution of echolocation in marine mammals.

== See also ==
- Hypersonic effect
