= Hypersonic effect =

Controversial claim that ultrasound produces measurable reactions in humans

The hypersonic effect is a phenomenon reported in a controversial scientific study by Tsutomu Oohashi et al., which claims that, although humans cannot consciously hear ultrasound (sounds at frequencies above approximately 20 kHz), the presence or absence of those frequencies has a measurable effect on their physiological and psychological reactions.

Numerous other studies have contradicted the portion of the results relating to the subjective reaction to high-frequency audio, finding that people who have "good ears" listening to Super Audio CDs and high resolution DVD-Audio recordings on high fidelity systems capable of reproducing sounds up to 30 kHz cannot tell the difference between high resolution audio and the normal CD sampling rate of 44.1 kHz.

== Favoring evidence ==
In research published in 2000 in the Journal of Neurophysiology, researchers described a series of objective and subjective experiments in which subjects were played music, sometimes containing high-frequency components (HFCs) above 25 kHz and sometimes not. The subjects could not consciously tell the difference, but when played music with the HFCs, they showed differences measured in two ways:

- EEG monitoring of their brain activity showed statistically significant enhancement in alpha-wave activity
- The subjects preferred the music with the HFCs

No effect was detected on listeners in the study when only the ultrasonic (frequencies higher than 24 kHz) portion of the test material was played for test subjects; the demonstrated effect was only present when comparing full-bandwidth to bandwidth-limited material.

It is a common understanding in psychoacoustics that the ear cannot respond to sounds at such high frequency via an air-conduction pathway, so one question that this research raised was: does the hypersonic effect occur via the "ordinary" route of sound travelling through the air passage in the ear, or in some other way? A peer-reviewed study in 2006 seemed to confirm the second of these options, by testing the different effects of HFCs when presented via loudspeakers or via headphones — the hypersonic effect did not occur when the HFCs were presented via headphones.

The 2006 study also investigated the comfortable listening level (CLL) of music with and without HFCs, an alternative way of measuring subject response to the sound. The CLL for the music with HFCs was higher than that for the music without HFCs - this provides a quantitative way to demonstrate general listener preference for the music with HFCs.

== Contrary evidence ==
There are contradictions in Oohashi's results.

- No effect was detected on listeners in the Oohashi study when only the ultrasonic (frequencies higher than 24 kHz) portion of the test material was played for test subjects. The demonstrated effect was only present when comparing full-bandwidth to bandwidth-limited material.
- Bandwidth-limited material was more highly regarded by test subjects when full-bandwidth material was played immediately prior.

Researches from NHK laboratory have attempted carefully but unsuccessfully to reproduce Oohashi's results.

480 man-hours of listening tests conducted at the London AES convention in 1980 by Laurie Finchman of KEF concluded that subjects could not distinguish a 20 kHz band-limited version of a test signal from the original played back on equipment capable of reproducing sound up to 40 kHz.

System non-linearities (present to varying degrees in all audio reproduction electronics, loudspeakers, etc.) are known to produce lower-frequency intermodulation products when the system is stimulated with high-frequency signals. It is suggested that this mechanism could produce signals in the audible range that allow listeners to distinguish the signals. Artifacts like this are a common problem with PC-based hearing self-tests, for instance.

In September 2007, two members of the Boston Audio Society and the Audio Engineering Society published their study in which about half of the 554 double-blind ABX test listening trials made by 60 respondents showed the correct identification of high-resolution or CD-standard sampling rate. The results were no better than flipping a coin, producing 274 correct identifications (49.5% success), and it would have required at least 301 correct identifications given 554 trials (a modest 54.3% success rate) to exceed a 95% statistical confidence of audible difference, which will happen about once in twenty such tests by chance alone.

== Counter-contrary evidence ==
Criticism of Oohashi's studies has been directed primarily at the conclusions regarding listeners' preferences and the test material; there has been little criticism aimed at the physiological aspect of the studies.

Studies cited as contrary evidence did not address the physiological brain response to high-frequency audio, only the subject's conscious response to it. Further investigation of the observed physiological response appears to show that the ear alone does not produce the extra brain waves, but when the body is exposed to high-frequency sound, it produces some brain stimulus.

== See also ==
- Hypersonic speed
- Sound from ultrasound (known commercially as HyperSonic Sound)
- Ultrasonic hearing
