= Susan J. Napier =

Professor specializing in Japanese literature

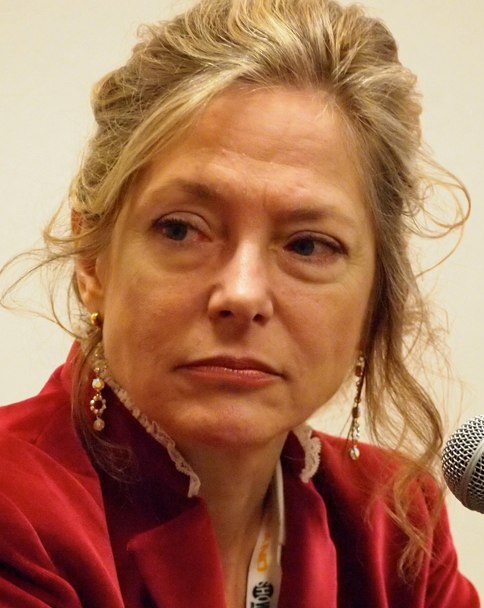
- Napier at New York Comic Con in 2012
- Born: Susan Jolliffe Phelps; October 1955 (age 70); Massachusetts, United States
- Education: Harvard University
- Occupations: Professor, anime critic
- Parents: Reginald H. Phelps; Julia Phelps (née Sears)
- Writing career
- Subject: Japanese literature
- Notable works: Anime from Akira to Princess Mononoke (2001); Miyazakiworld: A Life in Art (2018)

Susan Jolliffe Napier (née Phelps; born October 1955) is a professor of the Japanese program at Tufts University. She was formerly the Mitsubishi Professor of Japanese Literature and Culture at the University of Texas at Austin. She also worked as a visiting professor in the Department of East Asian Languages and Civilizations at Harvard University, and in Cinema and Media Studies at the University of Pennsylvania. Napier is an anime and manga critic.

== Biography ==
Susan Jolliffe Phelps was born in October 1955, the daughter of Reginald H. Phelps (1909–2006), a historian and educational administrator, and Julia Phelps (née Sears; d. 1995). She was raised in Cambridge, Massachusetts, graduated from Radcliffe College, and obtained her A.B., A.M., and PhD degrees from Harvard University. She married Ron Wells Napier on August 20, 1977, at King's Chapel, and their daughter, Julia Napier, was born on December 29, 1989. Napier taught Japanese and video at the University of Texas at Austin, and began working at a university in New York around 1985.

In 1991, Napier published Escape from the Wasteland: Romanticism and Realism in the Fiction of Mishima Yukio and Oe Kenzaburo. Her second book, The Fantastic in Modern Japanese Literature: The Subversion of Modernity, followed in 1996. Napier first became interested in anime and manga when a student showed her a copy of Akira. Napier then saw the film, which led to the creation of her third book, Anime from Akira to Princess Mononoke: Experiencing Contemporary Japanese Animation, which was revised in 2005. Napier's From Impressionism to Anime: Japan as Fantasy and Fan Cult in the Mind of the West was published in 2007, which discusses anime fandom in greater depth.

Napier met her husband, Steve Coit, the year she started researching her book Miyazakiworld: A Life in Art, which was released eight years later in 2018.

== Works ==
- ——— (1996). The Fantastic in Modern Japanese Literature: The Subversion of Modernity. London: Routledge. p. 272. ISBN 978-0-415-12458-4.
- ——— (1998). "Vampires, Psychic Girls, Flying Women and Sailor Scouts". In Martinez, Dolores P (ed.). The Worlds of Japanese Popular Culture: Gender, Shifting Boundaries and Global Culture. Cambridge University Press. ISBN 0-521-63128-9.
- ——— (2001). Anime from Akira to Princess Mononoke: Experiencing Contemporary Japanese Animation. Palgrave Macmillan. p. 311. ISBN 978-0-3122-3863-6.
- ——— (2001). "Confronting Master Narratives: History As Vision in Miyazaki Hayao's Cinema of De-assurance". Positions: East Asia Cultures Critique. 9 (2): 467–493. doi:10.1215/10679847-9-2-467. S2CID 144130648.
- ——— (2006). Meet Me on the Other Side: Strategies of Otherness in Modern Japanese literature. London: Routledge. pp. 38–55. ISBN 978-0-415-36185-9.
- ——— (2006). "'Excuse Me, Who Are You?': Performance, the Gaze, and the Female in the Works of Kon Satoshi". In Brown, Steven T (ed.). Cinema Anime: Critical Engagements with Japanese Animation. Palgrave Macmillan. ISBN 978-1-4039-8308-4.
- ——— (2007). "When the Machine Stops: Fantasy, Reality, and Terminal Identity in Neon Genesis Evangelion and Serial Experiments: Lain". Robot Ghosts and Wired Dreams: Japanese Science Fiction from Origins to Anime. University of Minnesota Press. p. 269. ISBN 978-0-8166-4973-0.
- ——— (March 11, 2008). From Impressionism to Anime: Japan as Fantasy and Fan Cult in the Mind of the West. Palgrave Macmillan. p. 272. ISBN 978-1-4039-6214-0.
- ——— (2018). Miyazakiworld: A Life in Art. Yale University Press. p. 344. ISBN 978-0-300-22685-0.
