= Anime from Akira to Princess Mononoke =

Book by Susan J. Napier

Anime from Akira to Princess Mononoke: Experiencing Contemporary Japanese Animation
- First edition cover, published in 2001
- Author: Susan J. Napier
- Language: English
- Subject: anime
- Publisher: Palgrave Macmillan
- Publication date: 2001
- Publication place: United States
- Media type: Print (paperback)
- Pages: 311 pp (first edition)
- ISBN: 0-312-23863-0
- OCLC: 45189031
- Dewey Decimal: 791.43/3 21
- LC Class: NC1766.J3 N37 2001

Anime from Akira to Princess Mononoke: Experiencing Contemporary Japanese Animation is a scholarly book which uses techniques of literary criticism on anime by Susan J. Napier published in 2001 by Palgrave Macmillan. It discusses themes of shōjo, hentai, mecha, magical girlfriend and magical girl anime using select titles. It also discusses some aspects of the English-speaking anime fandom. The book has been translated into Japanese, and had four editions, before a revised fifth edition was published in 2005 as Anime from Akira to Howl's Moving Castle: Experiencing Contemporary Japanese Animation.

== Contents ==
The book uses literary criticism to discuss themes and ideas present in select anime titles and attempts to categorise anime into three types: apocalyptic, festival, and elegiac. The book is split into five sections. In the first, Napier asks why anime is important as a topic of study. In the second, Napier looks at the representation of the human body in anime, looking at "monstrous adolescents", pornographic anime and cyborgs. In the third, Napier looks at representations of females, the girl, the magical girl and magical girlfriends. In the fourth section, Napier examines historical-themed anime.

== Reception ==
The book has been criticised for its scholarly nature and "dryness", as well as the limited choice of titles presented. Napier also does not include discussion of the anime industry. It was praised for not trying to make there be just one reading of all anime. It was criticised for not examining the graphical stylistic conventions of anime and for failing to address the issue of 'Japanese patriarchy'. It has been noted that Napier focusses on the narrative qualities of anime, covering ideas, images and themes presented, but that as of 2006, the book is still current and timely, and has an accurate tone when it discusses the anime fandom. The clear language of the book has been praised.

There are some factual errors in the book when describing plot summaries and descriptions of series. The book does not engage with the history of anime, or attempt to discern why anime is a distinct medium, or discuss the hallmarks of different formats of anime, such as TV series as opposed to OVAs or animated movies.

The book has been described as "a great textbook for undergraduates" and is used as a course text by university subjects which focus on East Asian cinema, examining Japanese cyberpunk, examining the supernatural in Japanese fiction, depictions of the apocalypse in Asian cinema, gender studies in East Asia and courses on animation itself.

In 2020, Ohio lawmakers Reggie Stoltzfus and Don Jones called for Kent State University to withdraw the book from the university, arguing the book contained adult material not suitable for minors attending the university. Napier responded by saying: "It was shocking to me they would want to have the book banned and use terms like "pornographic" about the book. The idea of feeling that if you don't like a subject you ignore or suppress anything controversial is not a very sensible way to approach a subject. It can come back and flower even more because it's seen as forbidden."
