= Nozomu Sasaki =

Japanese voice actor and singer (born 1967)

- 佐々木 望
- Born: January 25, 1967 (age 59); Hiroshima, Japan
- Occupations: Voice actor; singer
- Years active: 1986–present
- Agent: Aoni Production
- Website: www.nozomusasaki.com

Nozomu Sasaki (佐々木 望, Sasaki Nozomu; born January 25, 1967) is a Japanese voice actor and singer. He is represented by the voice actor management firm Aoni Production, and was previously represented by Arts Vision and 81 Produce. In 1988, he voiced the character Tetsuo Shima in the film Akira, which was adapted from the manga of the same name. He also voiced Yusuke Urameshi in the anime adaptation of the manga YuYu Hakusho and reprised the role in video games for the franchise. He is sometimes mistaken for fellow voice actress Nozomi Sasaki, whose name is written the same way. Sasaki has emerged the victor of the Seiyū Grand Prix (in which votes were collected to compile a top ten list of voice actors) more times than any other voice actor.

Sasaki was known for having a high-pitched voice, but by 1998 it became lower due to constantly overworking in voice acting and singing, although it was initially suspected that the reason his voice changed was due to his constant smoking and drinking. He is an avid reader and can speak English.

== Filmography ==
=== Anime series ===
1986

- Doteraman (Tanki)

1988

- Yoroiden Samurai Troopers (Shin Mori a.k.a. Suiko no Shin (Shin of the Torrent))

1989

- Momotaro Densetsu (Momotarou)

1991

- Genji Tsūshin Agedama (Agedama Genji)

1992

- YuYu Hakusho (Yusuke Urameshi)

1994

- Magic Knight Rayearth (Guru Clef)
- Captain Tsubasa J (Tsubasa Ozora (adult))

1996

- Gundam X (Olba Frost)

1997

- Ehrgeiz (Hal)
- Revolutionary Girl Utena (Ruka Tsuchiya)

1998

- Weiß Kreuz (Nagi Naoe)
- Cardcaptor Sakura (Eriol Hiiragizawa)

1999

- Monster Farm (Hare)

2002

- The Prince of Tennis (Jin Akutsu)

2003

- Naruto (Gekko Hayate)

2004

- Fafner in the Azure (Hiroto Douma)
- Yu-Gi-Oh! Duel Monsters (Shadi, Priest Shada)
- Monster (Johan Liebert)
- Samurai Champloo (Yukimaru)
- Kyo Kara Maoh! (Daikenja and Janus)

2005

- Blood+ (Karl Fei-Ong)

2007

- Death Note (Mello)

2014

- World Trigger (Hyrein)

2015

- Fafner in the Azure: EXODUS (Hiroto Douma)
- Garo: Crimson Moon (Shijō Kintō)

2017

- Pocket Monsters: Sun & Moon (Hayate (Horacio))

2019

- 7 Seeds (Takahiro Aramaki)
- Blade of the Immortal -Immortal- (Kagehisa Anotsu)

2021

- Getter Robo Arc (Messiah Tyr)

2022

- Eternal Boys (Makoto Kakizaki)

2024

- Bucchigiri?! (Marito)
- The Witch and the Beast (Necromancer)
- Grendizer U (Great King Vega)

Unknown date

- Soreike! Anpanman (Mezamashi-kun)
- Majin Tantei Nougami Neuro (Yuuya Higuchi)
- Maximo (The Grim Reaper)
- Rurouni Kenshin OVAs (Enishi Yukishiro and Gentatsu Takatsuki)
- Solatorobo: Red The Hunter (Blanck)
- Shigurui: Death Frenzy (Seigen Irako)
- Tetsuwan Tantei Robotack (Robotack)
- Yagami-kun's Family Affairs (Shigeki Yaoi)

=== Original video animation ===
- Bubblegum Crisis (1987) (Mackie Stingray)
- Legend of the Galactic Heroes (1988) (Julian Mintz)
- Earthian (1989) (Chihaya)
- Here is Greenwood (1991) (Kazuya Hasukawa)
- The Heroic Legend of Arslan (1991) (Eram)
- Ushio & Tora (1992) (Ushio Aotsuki)
- Please Save My Earth (1993) (Hajime Sakaguchi)

=== Anime films ===
- Akira (1988) (Tetsuo Shima)
- Mobile Suit Gundam: Char's Counterattack (1988) (Hathaway Noa)
- Doraemon: Nobita and the Spiral City (1997) (Pibu)
- Fafner in the Azure: Heaven and Earth (2010) (Hiroto Douma)
- Gothicmade (2012)
- Yu-Gi-Oh!: The Dark Side of Dimensions (2016) (Shadi Shin)
- In This Corner of the World (2016)
- Mobile Suit Gundam: Hathaway (2021) (Gass H. Huguest)
- Mobile Suit Gundam: Hathaway – The Sorcery of Nymph Circe (2026) (Gass H. Huguest / Hathaway Noa (Note: Archive voice from Char's Counterattack))

=== Video games ===
- Tekken 2 (1995) (Lee Chaolan)
- Tactics Ogre: Let Us Cling Together (1996) (Sega Saturn version)
- Valkyrie Profile and Valkyrie Profile: Lenneth (????) (Lucio)
- Ehrgeiz (1998) (Cloud Strife, Zack Fair; PS1 version)
- Tekken Tag Tournament (1999/2000) (Lee Chaolan)
- Atelier Iris 3: Grand Phantasm (2006) (Edge Vanhite)
- Super Robot Wars series (????) (Olba Frost, Hiroto Douma)
- The King of Fighters 2001 (2001) (K9999)
- The King of Fighters 2002 (2002) (K9999)
- Jump Force (2019) (Yusuke Urameshi)

=== Tokusatsu ===
- Tetsuwan Tantei Robotack (1998) (Robotack)
- Bakuryu Sentai Abaranger (2003) (Trinoid 19: Hagetakaraichi (ep. 35))
- Mahou Sentai Magiranger (2005) (Hades Warrior God Wyvern (ep. 35 - 46))
- Battle Cats! (2008) (Saburou Neko-no-tama)
- Doubutsu Sentai Zyuohger vs. Ninninger the Movie: Super Sentai's Message from the Future (2017) (Gillmarda)

=== Dubbing ===
==== Live-action ====
- Brian Austin Green
  - Beverly Hills, 90210 (David Silver)
  - Domino (Brian Austin Green)
  - Impact Point (Holden Gregg)
  - Cross Wars (Callan)
  - BH90210 (Brian Austin Green/David Silver)
- The Schouwendam 12 (Rogier van Pallant (Benja Bruijning))
- SEAL Team (Sonny Quinn (A. J. Buckley))
- Station Eleven (Arthur Leander (Gael García Bernal))

==== Animation ====
- Thomas the Tank Engine & Friends (Edward the Blue Engine (Season 9-present replacing Yasuhiro Takato))

== Discography ==
=== Singles ===
1. [1989.11.29] Yappari Koi Darou (やっぱり恋だろう!)
2. [1991.07.19] BE MY TABU
3. [1992.07.25] Kuruoshii Natsu (狂おしい夏)
4. [1994.11.21] Mezame no Hate ni... (目覚めの果てに…)

=== Album ===
1. [1990.05.30] HEART SCANDAL
2. [1990.12.28] Junjou (純情)
3. [1992.11.06] rumblefish
4. [1995.06.21] Different Beat
5. [1996.08.21] I'm in The Mood
6. [1997.08.01] DOUBLE DIRECTION

=== Mini Album ===
1. [1992.01.11] BABYLON
2. [1995.12.26] FLARE

=== Best Album ===
1. [1993.07.28] Taste of tears
2. [1993.07.28] Colors of smile

=== Live Album ===
1. [1996.04.19] Concert Tour "Flare'95" LIVE

== Accolades ==
- Kei Tomiyama and Kazue Takahashi Award at the 18th Seiyu Awards (2024)
