= Katsuhiro Otomo =

Japanese manga artist and filmmaker (born 1954)

Katsuhiro Otomo 大友 克洋
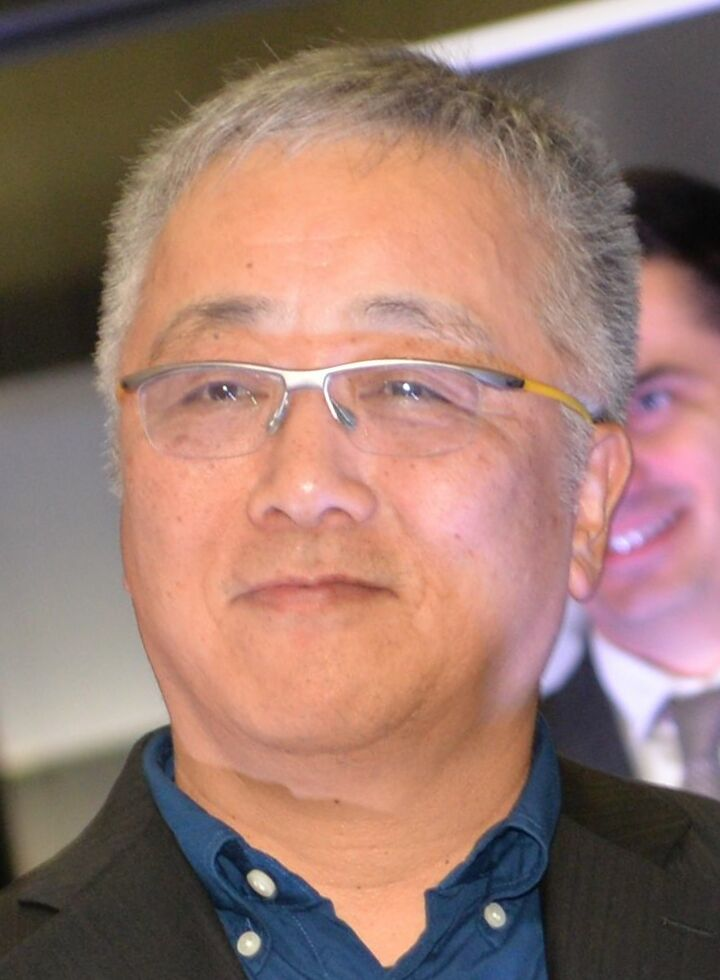
- Otomo in 2016
- Born: April 14, 1954 (age 72) Miyagi Prefecture, Japan
- Areas: Cartoonist, Writer
- Notable works: Dōmu; Akira; Metropolis; Steamboy
- Awards: Seiun Award (1982, 1984); Nihon SF Taisho Award (1983); Kodansha Manga Award (1984); Will Eisner Award (1992, 2002); Harvey Award (1993); Annie Award (2014); Grand Prix de la ville d'Angoulême (2015)
- Spouse: Yoko Otomo
- Children: Shohei Otomo

Katsuhiro Otomo (大友 克洋, Ōtomo Katsuhiro; born April 14, 1954) is a Japanese manga artist, screenwriter, animator, and film director. He first rose to prominence as a pioneer founder of the New Wave in the 1970s. He is best known as the creator of Akira, both the original 1982 manga series and the 1988 animated film adaptation. In 2005, Otomo was decorated a Chevalier of the French Ordre des Arts et des Lettres, promoted to Officier of the order in 2014, and became the fourth manga artist ever inducted into the American Eisner Award Hall of Fame in 2012. Celebrated in Japan, he was also awarded the Purple Medal of Honor from the national government in 2013.

In addition, Otomo later received the Winsor McCay Award at the 41st Annie Awards in 2014 and the 2015 Grand Prix de la ville d'Angoulême, the first manga artist to receive the award.

== Early life ==
Katsuhiro Otomo was born in Tome, Miyagi Prefecture and grew up in Tome District. He said that living in the very rural Tōhoku region left him with nothing to do as a child, so he read a lot of manga. As the only boy in a family with older and younger sisters, he enjoyed reading and drawing manga on his own and thought about becoming a manga artist. Limited by his parents to buying one manga book a month, Otomo typically chose Kobunsha's Shōnen magazine, which included Astro Boy by Osamu Tezuka and Tetsujin 28-go by Mitsuteru Yokoyama, series which he would copy drawing in elementary school. However, he said it was after reading Shotaro Ishinomori's How to Draw Manga that he understood how to draw manga properly and started doing so more seriously.

In high school, Otomo developed an interest in movies, that led to his ambition to become an illustrator or film director. At this time, one of his friends introduced him to an editor at Futabasha, who, after seeing Otomo's manga, told the high school student to contact him if he moved to Tokyo after graduating. Otomo did exactly that, and began his career in Tokyo as a 19-year old professional manga artist.

== Career ==
=== Manga ===
On October 4, 1973, Otomo published his first work, a manga adaptation of Prosper Mérimée's short story "Mateo Falcone," titled "A Gun Report."

In 1979, after writing multiple short-stories for the magazine Weekly Manga Action, Otomo created his first science-fiction work, titled Fireball. Although the manga was never completed, it is regarded as a milestone in Otomo's career as it contained many of the same themes he would explore in his later, more successful manga such as Dōmu. Dōmu began serialization in January 1980 and ran until July 1981. It was not published in book form until 1983, when it won the Nihon SF Taisho Award. It also won the 1984 Seiun Award for Best Comic.

In a collaboration with writer Toshihiko Yahagi, Otomo illustrated Kibun wa mō Sensō about a fictional war that erupts in the border between China and the Soviet Union. It was published in Weekly Manga Action from 1980 to 1981 and collected into one volume in 1982. It won the 1982 Seiun Award for Best Comic. 38 years later, the two created the one-shot sequel Kibun wa mō Sensō 3 (Datta Kamo Shirenai) for the April 16, 2019, issue of the magazine.

Also in 1981, Otomo drew A Farewell to Weapons for the November 16 issue of Kodansha's Young Magazine. It was later included in the 1990 short story collection Kanojo no Omoide...

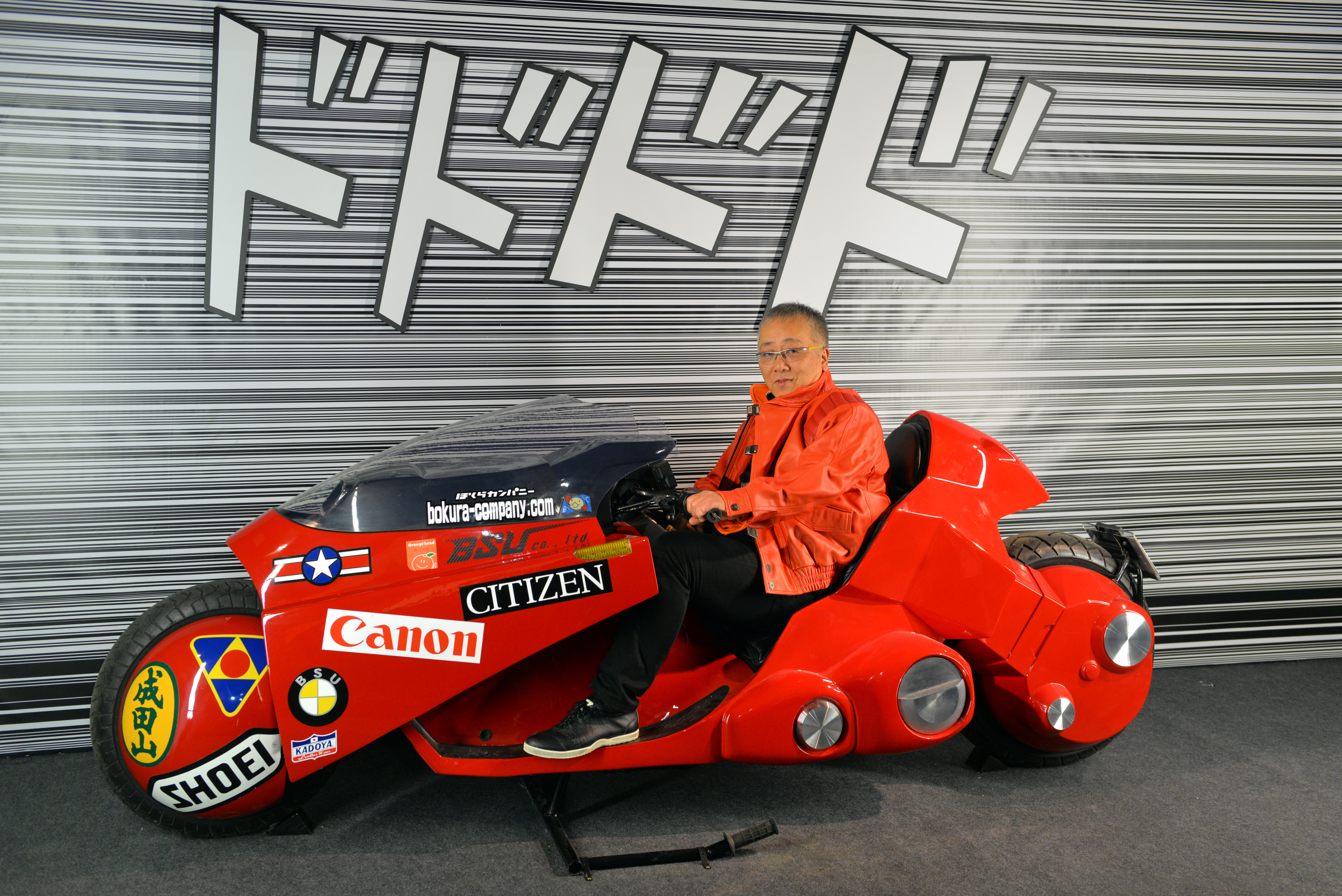
Otomo posing on a replica of a futuristic motorcycle seen in his series Akira (2016)

In 1982, Otomo began what would become his most acclaimed and famous work: Akira. Kodansha had been asking him to write a series for their new Young Magazine for some time, but he had been busy with other work. From the first meeting with the publisher, Akira was to be only about ten chapters "or something like that", so Otomo said he was really not expecting it to be a success. It was serialized for eight years and 2000 pages of artwork.

In 1990, Otomo did a brief interview with MTV for a general segment on the Japanese manga scene at the time. Otomo created the one-shot Hi no Yōjin about people who put out fires in Japan's Edo period for the debut issue of Comic Cue in January 1995.

Otomo wrote the 2002 picture book Hipira: The Little Vampire, which was illustrated by Shinji Kimura.

Otomo created the full-color work DJ Teck no Morning Attack for the April 2012 issue of Geijutsu Shincho.

Following the 2011 Tōhoku earthquake and tsunami, Otomo, a native of the Tōhoku region, designed a relief that features a boy riding a robot goldfish in rough seas, while flanked by Fūjin and Raijin. Intended to capture the region's will to overcome the natural disaster, it has been located on the first floor of the terminal building at Sendai Airport since March 2015.

Otomo was initially reported in 2012 to be working on his first long-form manga since Akira. Planning to draw the work that is set during Japan's Meiji period without assistants, he was initially targeting a younger audience, but said the story had developed more towards an older one. Although planned to begin in fall 2012, Otomo revealed in November of that year that the series had been delayed. By 2018, Otomo said he was doing a full-length work, but the contents were still secrets. In 2022, Kodansha released Otomo's entire body of manga since 1971 as part of "The Complete Works Project", which featured six separate releases of two books each. It was noted that some of his manga were edited when initially compiled into book format, and this new project, personally overseen by Otomo, restored them to how they appeared in their original serialization.

=== Film ===
At the age of 25, Otomo spent about 5 million yen to make a 16 mm live-action film about an hour long. He said that making this private film showed him roughly how to make and direct movies. In 1982, Otomo made his anime debut, working as character designer for the animated film Harmagedon: Genma Wars. It was while working on this film that Otomo began to think he could do it by himself.

In 1987, Otomo directed an animated work for the first time: a segment, which he also wrote the screenplay and drew animation for, in the anthology feature Neo Tokyo. He followed this up with two segments in another anthology released that year, Robot Carnival. In 1988, he directed the animated film adaptation of his manga Akira.

Otomo was executive producer of 1995's Memories, an anthology film based on three of his stories. Additionally, he wrote the script for Stink Bomb and Cannon Fodder, the latter of which he also directed.

Otomo has worked extensively with the studio Sunrise. In 1998, he directed the CG short Gundam: Mission to the Rise to celebrate the 20th anniversary of their Gundam franchise. The studio has animated and produced his 2004 feature film Steamboy, 2006's Freedom Project, and 2007's SOS! Tokyo Metro Explorers: The Next. The last, is based on Otomo's 1980 manga SOS! Tokyo Metro Explorer and follows the son of its main characters.

The 2001 animated film Metropolis features a script written by Otomo that adapts Tezuka's manga of the same name.

Otomo directed the 2006 live-action film Mushishi, based on Yuki Urushibara's manga of the same name.

In 2013, Otomo took part in Short Peace, an anthology consisting on 4 short films; he directed Combustible, a tragic love story set in the Edo period based on his 1995 manga Hi no Yōjin, while Hajime Katoki directed A Farewell to Weapons, depicting a battle in a ruined Tokyo based on Otomo's 1981 manga of the same name. Combustible won the Grand Prize in the Animation category of the Japan Media Arts Festival in 2012, and was even shortlisted for the 2013 Best Animated Short at the 85th Academy Awards.

Otomo directed the music video for Aya Nakano's 2016 song "Juku-Hatachi". He is a fan of the singer and previously drew the cover to her 2014 album Warui Kuse.

Reports have suggested that Otomo will be the executive producer of the live-action film adaptation of Akira. In 2019, he announced that he is writing and directing an animated film adaptation of his 2001 manga Orbital Era with Sunrise and released a trailer that same year.

== Style ==
Otomo said that when he started his professional career in the late 1970s, "almost all manga was gekiga like Golgo 13. So it was all gekiga or sports manga, nothing to do with science fiction." Remembering how much he loved science fiction as a child, Otomo wanted to recreate that kind of excitement; "That was in part how something like Domu came about. ... There was no hard science fiction manga ... so I wanted to change that and do something more realistic and believable."

Describing his characterization style, Otomo said he first tried to draw and imitate "very traditional manga-like art", such as Astro Boy. But by the time he was in high school, illustration work by people like Tadanori Yokoo and Yoshitaro Isaka was popular, so he wanted to create manga characters with this illustrative art style. When asked about how Japanese critics praise him as the first manga artist to draw realistic Japanese faces, Otomo said he always tries to balance fantasy and realism; "Depicting things too realistically actually damages the social realism of the piece, and if you go too far into the realm of fantasy, that hurts its imaginative ability." However, he said the realism of his early works probably came from having used friends as character models. French cartoonist Moebius, who is known for realistic character designs, is often cited as one of Otomo's biggest influences. Otomo is considered to be one of the artists of the New Wave in manga in the late 1970s and 1980s especially due to his visual innovation.

Otomo includes homages to his favorite childhood manga in his work, and there were three manga authors that he really respected at that time; Osamu Tezuka, Shotaro Ishinomori and Mitsuteru Yokoyama. He named the main computer in Fireball ATOM after Tezuka's character of the same name, the character nicknamed Ecchan in Domu is a reference to Ishinomori's Sarutobi Ecchan, and the title character of Akira is also known as No. 28 in homage to Yokoyama's Tetsujin 28-go in addition to the two series having the "same overall plot." Ever since depicting the apartment complex in Domu, Otomo has had a large interest in architecture, proclaiming, "I don't think there was anyone before me who put this much effort into their depictions of buildings." He believes this habit of drawing detailed backgrounds was influenced by Shigeru Mizuki's manga, which showed him how important backdrops are to a story. Otomo strongly praised the framing done by Tetsuya Chiba, whose work he studied a lot out of admiration at a store in Kichijoji, for making it easy to grasp how tangible the backgrounds and characters are. It was taken from Chiba's Notari Matsutaro, a seinen sports manga that mainly inspired Otomo to develop his grammar for making manga, including Domu.

When asked about his influences in designing the mecha in Farewell to Weapons, Otomo pointed out that Studio Nue's work was popular at the time, specifically mentioning the powered suit designs by Kazutaka Miyatake and Naoyuki Kato. He also stated that he is a fan of mecha by Takashi Watabe and Makoto Kobayashi and is fond of those seen in Neon Genesis Evangelion, but explained that all his influences are jumbled and mixed together; "In short, I digest many different things and ideas tend to pop out from that."

== Legacy ==
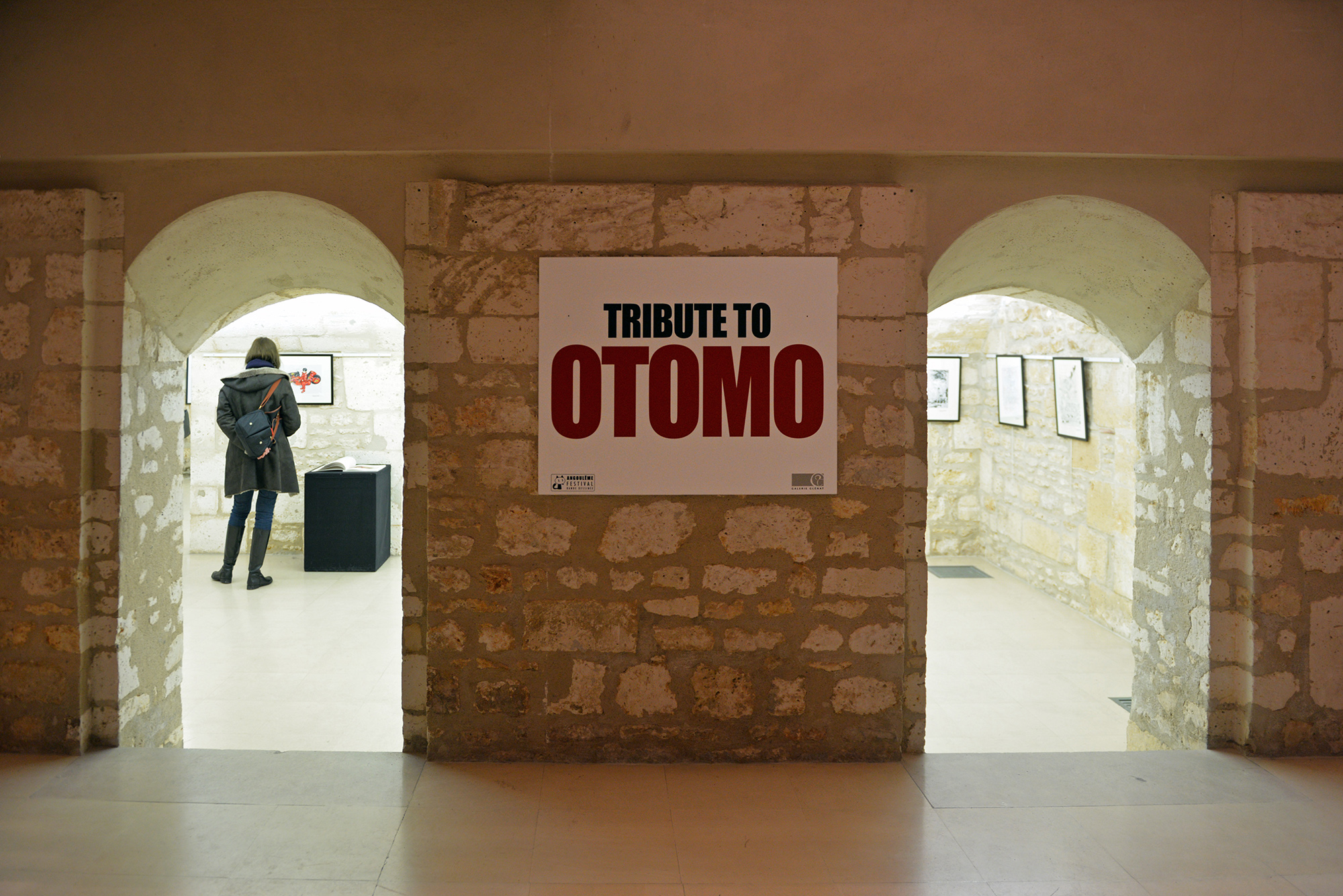
France's 2016 Angoulême International Comics Festival hosted an exhibition of art created in tribute to Otomo.

It was around the 1979 publication of his Short Peace short story collection that Otomo's work became influential in Japan. Artists influenced by him and his work include Hisashi Eguchi, Tetsuo Hara, Naoki Urasawa, Naoki Yamamoto, Makoto Aida and Hiroya Oku. When talking in 1997 about the future of manga, Urasawa opined that

[Osamu] Tezuka created the form that exists today, then caricatures appeared next, and comics changed again when Katsuhiro Otomo came on the scene. I don't think there's any room left for further changes.

Masashi Kishimoto cited Otomo as one of his two biggest influences, but liked Otomo's art style the best and imitated it while trying to develop his own. The Dragon Ball manga creator Akira Toriyama was interviewed on who was his favorite manga artist, and said that he found his peer Otomo to be "incredible."

Otomo's manga work also notably influenced a number of Japanese video game designers by the mid-1980s, including Enix's Yuji Horii (The Portopia Serial Murder Case and Dragon Quest), Capcom's Noritaka Funamizu (Gun.Smoke and Hyper Dyne Side Arms), UPL's Tsutomu Fujisawa (Ninja-Kid), Thinking Rabbit's Hiroyuki Imabayashi (Sokoban), dB-SOFT's Naoto Shinada (Volguard), Hot-B's Jun Kuriyama (Psychic City), and Microcabin's Masashi Katou (Eiyuu Densetsu Saga).

Director Satoshi Kon, who worked as an assistant to Otomo in both manga and film, cited Akira and especially Domu as influences. American film director Rian Johnson is a big fan of Otomo and pointed out similarities between how telekinesis is depicted in Domu and its depiction in his film Looper.

In 2017, the book Otomo: A Global Tribute to the Mind Behind Akira was published in Japan, France and the United States, featuring writing and artwork from 80 artists such as Masakazu Katsura, Taiyo Matsumoto, Masamune Shirow, Asaf and Tomer Hanuka, and Stan Sakai. From April 8 to May 8, 2021, comic art collector Phillipe Labaune's self-titled art gallery in New York City held "Good For Health, Bad For Education: A Tribute to Otomo" as its first exhibition. Including pieces originally curated by Julien Brugeas for the 2016 Angoulême International Comics Festival, it featured a total of 29 Otomo-inspired works by international artists such as Sara Pichelli, Paul Pope, Boulet, François Boucq, Giannis Milonogiannis and Ian Bertram.

== Personal life ==
Otomo is married to Yoko Otomo. Together they have one child, a son named Shohei Otomo, who is also an artist.

== Bibliography ==
=== Manga ===
Year(s)	Title	Original publication	Notes
1973	"A Gun Report" (銃声)	Weekly Manga Action (漫画アクション増刊)	Short story based on a work by Prosper Mérimée; published on 4 August 1973.
1973	"Best Friend" (親友)	Weekly Manga Action (漫画アクション増刊)	Short story based on a work by Edogawa Ranpo; published on 6 October 1973.
1973	"Uncle Smiley" (スマイリーおじさん)	Weekly Manga Action (漫画アクション増刊)	Short story based on a work by Mark Twain, published on 3 November 1973.
1973	"Hashi to soshite..." (橋とそして...)	Weekly Manga Action (漫画アクション増刊)	Short story published on 29 November 1973.
1973	"Kodomotachi wa Doko E..." (子供たちは何処へ...)	Weekly Manga Action (漫画アクション増刊)	Short story published on 20 December 1973.
1974	"Shanghai Wind" (上海かぜ)	Weekly Manga Action (漫画アクション増刊)	Short story published on 26 January 1974.
1974	"Mitsuryō no Yoru" (密漁の夜)	Weekly Manga Action (漫画アクション増刊)	Short story published on 28 February 1974.
1974	"Boogie Woogie Waltz"	Weekly Manga Action (漫画アクション増刊)	Short story published on 25 April 1974; later collected in Boogie Woogie Waltz.
1974	"Boogie Woogie Waltz"	Weekly Manga Action (漫画アクション増刊)	Short story published on 23 May 1974; later collected in Good Weather.
1974	"One Down"	Weekly Manga Action (漫画アクション増刊)	Short story published on 4 July 1974.
1974	"Mezameyo to Yobu Koe Ari" (目覚めよと呼ぶ声あり)	Weekly Manga Action (漫画アクション増刊)	Short story published on 15 August 1974; later collected in Boogie Woogie Waltz.
1974	"Shinjū '74 Aki" (心中ー'74秋ー)	Weekly Manga Action (漫画アクション増刊)	Short story published on 3 October 1974; later collected in Boogie Woogie Waltz.
1974	"Anya Kōro"〔"Kizu Darake no Tenshi"・1〕 (暗夜行路〔傷だらけの天使・1〕)	Weekly Manga Action (漫画アクション増刊)	Short story published on 31 October 1974; later collected in Boogie Woogie Waltz.
1974	"Pakku Kuso Omoshiroku mo Nakatta Kyō no Owari ni" 〔"Kizu Darake no Tenshi"・2〕 (パック糞面白くもなかった今日の終わりに〔傷だらけの天使・2〕)	Weekly Manga Action (漫画アクション増刊)	Short story published on 5 December 1974; later collected in Boogie Woogie Waltz.
1975	"Tankyori Sōsha no Rentai" 〔"Kizu Darake no Tenshi"・3〕 (短距離走者の連帯〔傷だらけの天使・3〕)	Weekly Manga Action (漫画アクション増刊)	Short story published on 6 February 1975; later collected in Boogie Woogie Waltz.
1975	"Shūaku no Kishimi" 〔"Kizu Darake no Tenshi"・4〕 (醜悪の軋み〔傷だらけの天使・4〕)	Weekly Manga Action (漫画アクション増刊)	Short story published on 6 March 1975; later collected in Boogie Woogie Waltz.
1975	"Choonpara Boogie Woogie Choonpara Boogie" 〔"Kizu Darake no Tenshi"・5〕 (チュンパラブギウギチュンパラブギ〔傷だらけの天使 ・5〕)	Weekly Manga Action (漫画アクション増刊)	Short story published on 5 June 1975; later collected in Boogie Woogie Waltz.
1975	"Sukat to Sukkiri" 〔"Kizu Darake no Tenshi"・6〕 (スカッとスッキリ〔傷だらけの天使 ・6〕)	Weekly Manga Action (漫画アクション増刊)	Short story published on 7 August 1975; later collected in Highway Star.
1975	"Tsujigiri" (辻斬り)	Weekly Manga Action (漫画アクション増刊)	Short story published on 23 August 1975; later collected in Boogie Woogie Waltz.
1975	"Rock〔Kizu Darake no Tenshi"・7〕 (Rock〔傷だらけの天使・7〕)	Weekly Manga Action (漫画アクション増刊)	Short story published on 27 November 1975; later collected in Boogie Woogie Waltz.
1976	"Kagami" (鏡)	Weekly Manga Action (漫画アクション増刊)	Short story published on 3 January 1976; later collected in Boogie Woogie Waltz.
1976	"Kagami Jigoku" (鏡地獄)	Bessatsu Manga Action	Short story based on a work by Edogawa Ranpo, published on 21 March 1976.
1976	"Ame-Lingo" (アメリンゴ)	Weekly Manga Action	Published in two parts on 8 and 15 April 1976; later collected in Good Weather.
1976	"Shusei Sanchi no Yuki Chan" (酒井さんちのユキエちゃん)	Manga Action Extra	Short story published on 16 July 1976; later collected in Highway Star.
1976	"Okasu" (犯す)	Weekly Manga Action	Short story published on 9 August 1976; later collected in Short Peace.
1976	"Highway Star" (ハイウェイスター)	Weekly Manga Action	Short story published on 1 September 1976; later collected in Highway Star.
1976	"Chuck Check Chicken"	Weekly Manga Action	Short story published on 3 November 1976; later collected in Good Weather.
1976	"School-Boy on Good Time"	Weekly Manga Action	Short story published on 3 December 1976; later collected in Short Peace.
1977	"Yume no Sōkyū" (夢の蒼穹)	Weekly Manga Action	Short story published on 7 January 1977; later collected in Short Peace.
1977	"Space Patrol Sigma" (宇宙パトロール・シゲマ)	Weekly Manga Action	Short story published on 1 February 1977; later collected in Short Peace.
1977	"'Round About Midnight	Weekly Manga Action	Short story published on 5th April 1977; later collected in Short Peace.
1977	"Nothing Will Be As It Was"	Weekly Manga Action	Short story published on 13th May 1977; later collected in Short Peace.
1977	"Whiskey Go-Go"	Weekly Manga Action	Short story published on 14th June 1977; later collected in Short Peace.
1977	"Seisō" (星霜)	Bessatsu Manga Action	Short story published on 1st July 1977; later collected in Highway Star.
1977	"Suzume ga Chyun" (雀が中)	Weekly Manga Action	Short story published on 12th July 1977; later collected in Highway Star.
1977	"Tenmō Nishite Morasazu" (天網恢恢疎にして漏らさず)	Weekly Manga Action	Short story published on 27th July 1977; later collected in Highway Star.
1977	"Miner Swing"	Weekly Manga Action special issue	Short story published in the August 24th, 1977; later reissued as a part of Kanojo no Omoide... short story collection.
1977–1978	Sayonara Nippon (さよならにっぽん)	Weekly Manga Action	Published as five parts in 1977.08.04, 1977.09.08, 1977.10.20, 1978.01.05 and 1978.02.23 issues; later collected in Sayonara Nippon.
1977	Good Weather	Weekly Manga Action	Published in two parts on 21st September and 2nd November of 1977; later collected in Good Weather.
1979	Fire-Ball	Action Deluxe	Published on January 27, 1979; unfinished.
1979–1980	Ōtomo Katsuhiro no Eiyō Manten! 大友克洋の栄養満点! ("Otomo Katsuhiro's Nutritious Fill!")	rockin'on	Two parts published in the May 1979 and April 1980 issues.
1979	Seija ga Machi ni Yattekuru 聖者が街にやってくる ("The Saint Comes to Town")	Weekly Manga Action	Short stories published in four parts, issues #17–20 (August 9, 1979; August 23, 1979; September 13, 1979; and September 27, 1979); later collected in Sayonara Nippon.
1979	G...	Young Comic (ヤングコミック)	Written by Nobuyuki Shirayama, published in four parts in 1979.08.01, 1979.08.08, 1979.08.15 and 1979.08.22 issues.
1979–1983	Manjū Kowai (饅頭こわい)	Variety (Kadokawa Shoten)	Illustrated essays.
1980–1981	Dōmu (童夢)	Action Deluxe	Published January 19, 1980 – July 6, 1981.
1980–1981	That's Amazing World	Weekly Manga Action	Published in five parts: September 11, 1980; November 20, 1980; February 26, 1981; May 14, 1981; and July 23, 1981.
1980–1981	Kibun wa mō Sensō (気分はもう戦争) ("I've Already Got the Feeling of War")	Manga Action special issue (漫画アクション増刊)	Written by Toshihiko Yahagi; revisited decades later with the sequel Kibun wa Mō Sensō 2.1 (2019).
1980–1981	Apple Paradise	Manga Kisōtengai (マンガ奇想天外) (Kisō Tengai-sha)	Unfinished; Episode 1 was published in four parts in summer and autumn of 1980 and winter and March of 1981 issues, Episode 2 was published in three parts in March, June and November of 1981 issues.
1981	Farewell to Weapons	Young Magazine	Published in two installments in issue #38, September 21, 1981; and issue #39, September 28, 1981.
1982–1990	Akira	Young Magazine	First episode debuted in issue #52, on December 6, 1982.
1984	"Visitors"	Action Deluxe	Short story published on 1st June 1984; later collected in SOS dai Tôkyô tankentai (SOS 大東京探検隊).
1990–2004	The Legend of Mother Sarah	Weekly Young Magazine	Illustrated by Takumi Nagayasu.
1995	Kanojo no Omoide... ("Magnetic Rose")	Young Magazine Kaizokuban	Published July 14, 1995; later adapted into the chapter "Cannon Fodder" of the 1995 anime anthology film Memories.
1995	"Hi no Yōjin" (火之要鎮)	Comic Cue (コミックキュー)	Published in the debut issue, January 1995.
1996	"The Third Mask"	Batman: Black & White #234 (DC Comics)	Writer, artist; published in the September 1996 issue.
2001	"Orbital Era"	Manga Action special issue	Later collected in Highway Star.
2002	Hipira: The Little Vampire (ヒピラくん)	Shufu-to-Seikatsu Sha Ltd.	Story book illustrated by Shinji Kimura.
2006	Park (公園)	Comic Cue (East Press)	
2012	DJ Teck no Morning Attack DJ TECK の MORNING ATTACK	Monthly Comic Beam	
2012	Kibun wa mō Sensō 3 (Datta Kamo Shirenai) 気分はもう戦争3（だったかも知れない） ("The Mood Was Already War 3 [Or Might Have Been]")	Brutus	Written by Toshihiko Yahagi.

=== Short story collections ===
Year(s)	Title	Notes
1979	Short Peace (ショート・ピース)	Published by Kisō Tengaisha on 10th March 1979. Reissued by Futabasha in 1984 as the third installment in the Katsuhiro Otomo Masterpiece Collection, with the addition of "Yume no Sōkyū" (夢の蒼穹).
1979	Highway Star (ハイウェイスター)	First short story collection in the Katsuhiro Otomo Masterpiece Collection published on 13th October 1979.
1981	Good Weather	Published on 1st February 1981.
1981	Sayonara Nippon	Second short story collection in the Katsuhiro Otomo Masterpiece Collection, released in 16th July 1981.
1981	Hansel & Gretel (ヘンゼルとグレーテル)	Published on 25th October 1981.
1982	Boogie Woogie Waltz	Published on 5th May 1982.
1990	Kanojo no Omoide... (彼女の想いで...)	Published on 23rd April 1990.
1996	SOS! Tokyo Metro Explorers (SOS大東京探検隊)	Published on 6th February 1996.

=== Artbooks ===
Year	Title	Notes
1989	Kaba	
1995	Akira Club	
2003	Akira Animation Archives	
2008	Viva il Ciclissimo!	Collaboration with Katsuya Terada
2012	Kaba 2	
2012	Genga	

== Filmography ==
Anime features

Year	Title	Director	Writer
1988	Akira	Yes	Yes
1991	Roujin Z	No	Yes
2001	Metropolis	No	Yes
2004	Steamboy	Yes	Yes
TBA	Orbital Era	Yes	Yes

Anime shorts

Year	Title	Director	Writer	Executive Producer	Notes
1987	Construction Cancellation Order	Yes	Yes	No	Segment of Neo Tokyo
1987	"Opening" and "Ending"	Yes	Yes	No	Segments of Robot Carnival
1995	Magnetic Rose	No	Yes	Yes	Segments of Memories
1995	Stink Bomb	No	Yes	Yes	Segments of Memories
1995	Cannon Fodder	Yes	Yes	Yes	Segments of Memories
1998	Gundam: Mission to the Rise	Yes	Yes	No	
2013	Combustible	Yes	Yes	No	Segment of Short Peace

Live-action

Year	Title	Director	Writer	Producer	Notes
1979	High School Erotopia: Red Uniforms	No	Yes	No	Pornographic film
1982	Jiyū wo Warera ni (じゆうを我等に)	Yes	Yes	Yes	
1991	World Apartment Horror	Yes	Yes	No	
2006	Mushishi	Yes	Yes	No	

Additional work

Besides his own animation, Otomo has contributed art designs to Harmagedon: Genma Wars, the Crusher Joe film, the seven-part OVA series Freedom Project, and Space Dandy episode 22.

He also oversaw the composition of the Spriggan animated film and directed the music video Juku-Hatachi (じゅうくはたち) for Aya Nakano.
