= When a Cat Faces West =

Japanese manga series

- First tankōbon volume cover, featuring Shacho (left), Hajime Hirota (center) and Chima Kondo (right)

猫が西向きゃ (Neko ga Nishi Mukya)
- Genre: Science fiction; Slice of life; Supernatural
- Manga
- Written by: Yuki Urushibara
- Published by: Kodansha
- English publisher: NA: Kodansha USA
- Imprint: Afternoon KC
- Magazine: Monthly Afternoon
- Original run: April 25, 2018 – December 25, 2020
- Volumes: 3
- icon

When a Cat Faces West (Japanese: 猫が西向きゃ, Hepburn: Neko ga Nishi Mukya (Note: The title is a play on the Japanese expression "when a dog turns west, its tail turns east" (犬が西向きゃ尾は東, Inu ga Nishi Mukya o wa Higashi), meaning that something is obvious.)) is a Japanese manga series written and illustrated by Yuki Urushibara. It was serialized in Kodansha's seinen manga magazine Monthly Afternoon from April 2018 to December 2020, with its chapters collected in three tankōbon volumes.

== Synopsis ==
=== Flow ===
"Flow" refers to the natural phenomenon where matter in space constantly undergoes minuscule shifts in form. Occasionally, these shifts manifest to become major structural transformations due to a loss of equilibrium. They vary in scale and impact, and often result in either disruptive or beneficial outcomes. The shift can last from a few days to many decades. Any person caught within the shift at the moment of occurrence are usually not physically harmed. The cause of these changes are either natural, occurring at random, or due to powerful thoughts from both humans and animals resonating with Flow unintentionally. When a Flow incident occurs, the area of the incident suddenly becomes foggy before the matter within changes temporarily. The changes can manifest in many ways, such as:

- Objects changing physical attributes (sharp corners on objects become rounded).
- Time rewinding to the past (an apartment building transforming into an old forest).
- Pathways to distant locations materializing in improbable places (a house full of cats appearing inside a cabinet).
- Mirrors opening up as entryways to other dimensions.
- Areas teleporting to random locations, the space it replaces being teleported to its former place.

=== Plot ===
Chima Kondo, a 35-year-old whose physical form has been reduced to that of a 12-year-old following a Flow incident she was caught in, has recently been hired as a part-time Flow Disposal contractor after quitting her office job. Her new role involves searching for Flow incidents in the area (usually man-made), investigating who or what caused the manifestation, and offering emotional support and guidance to those affected to restore matter to its natural state. Joining Hajime Hirota and his pet cat Shacho at Hirota Flow Inc., she realizes that the complexities of Flow are far more extensive than she initially understood, presenting significant opportunities for further investigation.

== Characters ==
Chima Kondo (近藤 智万, Kondo Chima)
A former office worker, Chima Kondo became a part-time contractor for Flow Disposal service through City Hall. Despite being 35, she was caught in a Flow incident one night and physically transformed into a 12-year-old, forcing her to quit her former job. In contrast to Hajime Hirota, she is disciplined and organized with her duties. Hirota calls her "Chima-chan".
Hajime Hirota (廣田 一, Hirota Hajime)
A Flow Disposal service contractor who operates Hirota Flow, Inc. He is much more lax at his job, often leaving his office a complete mess. However, he remains loyal to his work, and is deeply protective of his pet cat, Shacho. He is a skeptic, but is also scared of ghosts. It is later revealed that Hirota is from a parallel dimension, one where he was not a Flow specialist. Following a cat that he later named "Shacho" through a hidden path, he accidentally ended up in another world where Flow was known.
Shacho (しゃちょう, Shachō)
A small white male cat owned by Hirota. His name in kanji (社長) means "CEO" or "president". As a cat, he can detect people related to Flow incidents. When he does, his tail points up as he tracks them down. Whenever he is not at work, Hirota lets him roam the neighborhood on his own under many pseudonyms.

== Publication ==
Written and illustrated by Yuki Urushibara, When a Cat Faces West was serialized in Kodansha's seinen manga magazine Monthly Afternoon from April 25, 2018, to December 25, 2020. Kodansha collected its chapters in three tankōbon volumes, released from February 22, 2019, to February 22, 2021.

In April 2022, Kodansha USA announced that they licensed the manga for English digital release in North America.

=== Volumes ===
No.	Original release date	Original ISBN	English release date	English ISBN
1	February 22, 2019	978-4-06-514540-1	May 17, 2022	978-1-68-491171-4
1. "The Tail Does Not Always Face the East."; 2. "The Tail Goes Back in Time."; 3. "The Tail Is Looking for Something."; 4. "The Tail Turns Around."; 5. "The Tail Is In a Mirror."; 6. "The Tail Is Godly Belief."
2	February 21, 2020	978-4-06-518472-1	June 21, 2022	978-1-68-491224-7
7. "The Tail Is Out."; 8. "The Tail Can Go Anywhere."; 9. "Is Tail a Ghost...?"; 10. "The Tail Is Restored...?"; 11. "The Tail Is On the Stairs."; 12. "The Tail Is Beyond the Snow."
3	February 22, 2021	978-4-06-522254-6	July 19, 2022	978-1-68-491356-5
13. "There Is Another Tail."; 14. "The Tail Is On the Sea."; 15. "The Tail Swims In the Forest."; 16. "The Tail Can't Go Home."; 17. "The Tail Is On the Other Side."

== Reception ==
Reviewing the first volume for Anime News Network, Christopher Farris found the concept of Flow phenomenon interesting, but lamented how unexplored it was in favor of Yuki Urushibara's "nifty scenery", including "lovingly-detailed modern township locations, districts carried by their own personalities, then often twisted or spiced up when the supernatural 'Flow' phenomenon the story is built around comes into play." MrAJCosplay compared it to Urushibara's previous work Mushishi in terms of dealing with "rather heavy and existential subject matters through incredibly subdued yet profound tales of the supernatural", but felt the "laid-back and quiet nature" of the manga clashed with the seemingly dangerous implications of Flow. Jean-Karlo Lemus praised the inventiveness of Urushibara's "liminal nature" of Flow phemonena, and likened the character interactions between Hajime Hirota and Chima Kondo to "feel[ing] like old friends as you read their misadventures". Rebecca Silverman also found the concept of Flow phenomenon interesting, writing that "there's so much variation on display that no two chapters feel alike, creating a quiet but fascinating world that asks as many questions as it answers … it's interesting to see how each case differs from the ones before or after it while still leaving us plenty of things to wonder about."
