= Highway Star (manga) =

Graphic novel by Katsuhiro Otomo

ハイウェイ・スター (Haiuei Sutā)
- Manga
- Written by: Katsuhiro Otomo
- Published by: Futabasha
- Magazine: Weekly Manga Action
- Published: October 30, 1979
- Volumes: 1

Highway Star (ハイウェイ・スター, Haiuei Sutā) is a graphic novel by Katsuhiro Otomo. It is his second published collection of short stories, each running at roughly 20 pages, and includes Otomo's second-earliest collected story. It has been reprinted four times, the last time in 1997.

== Stories ==
- Kazoku (Family)

A young family - father, pregnant mother, young daughter and a baby - leave their home under clouded circumstances. It develops that the parents have gone bankrupt and are about to lose everything, and are - in despair - contemplating joint suicide. After giving their kids one last idyllic day of family activities, they check into a hotel and prepare lethal doses of sleeping pills. But even the gravest undertaking can be derailed by random absurdity...

- Suka To Sukkiri (Refreshment)

An unbearable heat in Tokyo during Summer forces a man to steal a ventilator in a store, only to fail and get chased away. He decides to hide in a family's house and take them hostage, though to his dismay they lack a ventilator too, and so comes up with another idea...

- Sakai Sanchi No Yukie Chan

A young girl named Yukie wishes to resemble a famous dancer she sees on TV, and so sets out dressed like her along with her gang of friends. The mothers soon start to worry, as the kids have totally disappeared and a pervert is roaming the streets...

- Suzume Ga Chyun (The Sparrow's in the Medium)

A father invites fellow businessmen around to his house, only forgetting to inform them of his rather dysfunctional family, and incredibly embarrassing acts ensue...

- Highway Star

While searching for gasoline for his car, a man meets a young woman who leads him to a diner, where he steals it from an empty car. Later, both take part in dangerous highway races to earn some yen... Years later, the woman comes across a somewhat familiar police biker...

- Tenmoo Kaikai So Nishite Morasazu (Your Sin Will Find You Out)

In the middle of the night, a young restaurant waiter is visited by three little angels, who refuse to stop teasing him in the following days, but they've made a slight mistake...

- Tsuya No Atosaki (Proof of Cleanliness)

A theatre actor isn't making great success with his work, and to cheer himself up, meets a prostitute in the seedier parts of the capital. Unfortunately, the prostitute's in fact a man, but the actor seems a little more merrier since those events, as he recalls to his meagre audience of three people...

- Seisoo (White Star)

A young man is employed to a private library, and has discussions with the other employees and the manager about its history. He soon discovers a terrifying secret overheard between two of the staff members...

- Ashita No Yakusoku (Promise of Tomorrow)

Two children are involved with the brutal murder of a man. A police investigation is called for, and two inspectors soon discover that the mother of the two kids is connected to the victim in some disturbed way...

- Sayonara No Omiyage (Gift of Goodbye)

The story of some police officers who run a competition, only to end up with one man being mysteriously murdered after one evening flirting with a hostess in an apartment...

== In other media ==
- In Highway Star, the protagonist's broken-down car has "FIREBALL" written on its side, a reference to one of Otomo's most famous shorts Fireball as well as the Deep Purple album with the same name.
- The two inspectors from Ashita No Yakusoku later appear in Otomo's Domu: A Child's Dream.
- Otomo apparently was inspired for the names "Highway Star" and "Fireball" by the two Deep Purple songs.
