= Mushishi (film) =

- Theatrical release poster

Japanese name
- Kanji: 蟲師
- Directed by: Katsuhiro Otomo
- Written by: Katsuhiro Otomo; Sadayuki Murai
- Based on: Mushishi by Yuki Urushibara
- Produced by: Satoru Ogura
- Starring: Joe Odagiri; Nao Ōmori; Yū Aoi; Makiko Esumi
- Cinematography: Takahide Shibanushi
- Edited by: Soichi Ueno
- Music by: Kuniaki Haishima
- Distributed by: Showgate
- Release dates: September 8, 2006 (Venice); March 24, 2007 (Japan)
- Running time: 131 minutes
- Country: Japan
- Language: Japanese
- Budget: $8.5 million
- Box office: $4.2 million (Japan)

Mushishi (Japanese: 蟲師), also known in English as Mushi-Shi: The Movie and Bugmaster, is a 2006 Japanese fantasy film directed by Katsuhiro Otomo, based on the manga series Mushishi by Yuki Urushibara. It stars Joe Odagiri as Ginko, a traveler who dedicates himself to protecting the populace from supernatural creatures called Mushi. Otomo began work on the film in 2005 after declining a jidaigeki project. He was interested in creating a mix of live action and animation and felt the manga gave him an appropriate creative vehicle.

The film debuted at the Venice International Film Festival in 2006 and was screened at several other festivals prior to its theatrical release on March 24, 2007, in Japan. The DVD was released in Japan in 2007, in the United Kingdom in 2008, and in North America in 2009. The film has received a mixed response from film critics. Many praised Odagiri's performance and its visuals but critiqued the plot and mythology as confusing. Mushishi received nominations and awards at film festivals and was among the 100 highest-grossing films of 2007 in Japan.

== Plot ==
Mushishi opens with Yoki and his mother walking along a mountain when a cliff suddenly collapses. This is followed by a nonlinear narrative that moves between the past and the present. A series of flashbacks reveal that only Yoki survived, coming under the care of Nui, who is a Mushishi (or Bugmaster)—an expert in Mushi, which are supernatural bug-like creatures that are invisible to most humans. She lives near a pond where there are two types of Mushi: a fish-like Ginko who swims in the darkness-like Tokoyami. Because Nui spent too long looking at the Ginko, one of her eyes and the color of her hair were altered by the shadow of Tokoyami. Eventually, Nui is swallowed by the Tokoyami. When Yoki tries to help her, he is also swallowed. Only by sacrificing one of his eyes and his memories is Yoki able to survive. He then renames himself Ginko because it is the only name he can remember.

In the present, Ginko, to escape a blizzard, finds a village inn. After revealing himself as a Mushishi, he is asked to help several locals suffering from hearing loss. After he helps the locals, Ginko is asked by the innkeeper to look at her granddaughter, Maho, who is deaf, has horns on her forehead, and hears strange noises. Maho's mother had the same symptoms and was cremated after her death. Maho, however, kept her mother's horns, which turned out to be a disguised Mushi and the cause of her illness. Ginko heals the girl and then continues on his journey.

Ginko receives a letter requesting his presence from Tanyu, a woman infected with a Mushi that demands her to write about Mushi to expel it. On the way, he meets Koro, a Mushishi who is trying to capture a rainbow-like Mushi. They go to the house of Tanyu, where her nanny, Tama, says that a white-haired woman told them about the Tokoyami. When Tanyu tried to write about it, she was afflicted by paralysis and gangrene. Ginko then asks to read about the Tokoyami; while he is reading, the Tokoyami from the writings leave them and return to Tanyu, further exacerbating her condition.

Ginko faces the Tokoyami itself in the writings warehouse, while Tama and Koro try to remove the Tokoyami by bloodletting. The newly healed Tanyu accompanies Tama and Koro to the warehouse, where they find a collapsed Ginko. Tanyu begins to remove the writings from Ginko's body and reattach them to the parchments. After Tanyu removes the writings, Ginko awakens and continues on with Koro. The pair finds the rainbow-like Mushi. After this, they part ways, and Koro goes back to his hometown to build bridges. Ginko faces a Tokoyami-possessed Nui and carries her to the River of Light (or Koumyaku), a stream of glittering Mushi called Kouki—the origin of Mushi life.

== Cast ==
- Joe Odagiri as Ginko
- Makiko Esumi as Nui
- Nao Ōmori as Koro
- Yū Aoi as Tanyu
- Lily as innkeeper
- Reisen Lee as Tama
- Reia Moriyama as Maho
- Makiko Kuno as Maho's mother
- Hideyuki Inada as Yoki
- Baku Numata as Nui's husband

== Production ==
... some people will probably feel that the film doesn't have a real climax. It sort of calmly moves toward its end. But that too is very much like our lives as human beings. If you look back at your life, maybe you can point to moments that you feel were a climax or a turning point, but when they actually happened you didn't experience them the same way. Life moves ahead quite calmly and gradually, and I wanted to bring that same feeling to [this film].

— Katsuhiro Otomo

In November 2005, Katsuhiro Otomo announced that he would direct a live-action film based on Mushishi, a Kodansha manga by Yuki Urushibara, which would star Joe Odagiri and Makiko Esumi and would be released in 2006. Japan Digital Content Trust planned to raise $2.2 million (¥260 million) of the film's projected $8.5 million (¥1 billion) budget. Its filming lasted three months, and production of the film took two years.

Initially, producer Satoru Ogura came up with the idea of making a jidaigeki in collaboration with the team that worked on Crouching Tiger, Hidden Dragon. Otomo was not confident in working on "a project of that size" as he had only directed one live-action film in 1991, titled World Apartment Horror. He instead suggested adapting Mushishi as he felt it would be "an opportunity to mix live action and computer graphics, to create a hybrid of the natural and the virtual".

Otomo felt that the concept of Mushishi was sufficiently unique to interest him creatively. He found the episodic nature of the work challenging but was able to fashion a cohesive screenplay by combining elements of the different stories present in the manga. Although he sent his script to Urushibara for review, she gave him complete creative autonomy. Otomo describes the film as "a kind of fable", and as such, he chose the Meiji era as its setting because he felt it offered the best framing for the story, as he considered the sudden disappearances of certain characters were also consistent with the nature of that historical period.

== Release ==
The worldwide premiere of Mushishi took place at the 63rd Venice International Film Festival, which ran from August 30 to September 9, 2006. The film was shown at the "Visions" section of the Toronto International Film Festival in September 2006 under the title of Bugmaster. It was later screened in January at the 2007 Sundance Film Festival in the "Spectrum" section. It opened in Japanese theaters on March 24, 2007, after the release of a novelization by Naoki Tsujii on February 23, a soundtrack album by Avex on March 14, and a book with details about the film's production by Kodansha on March 22. In October of the same year, it was shown at the 2007 Sitges Film Festival.

In Japan, the film was released in DVD format by Tohokushinsha Film on October 26, 2007. Revolver Entertainment licensed it in January 2008 and was released on DVD in the United Kingdom on February 25. In September 2008, Funimation announced that it had acquired the distribution rights of the film to North America. A Blu-ray version was released in Japan on February 20, 2009, while Funimation released its DVD version on August 25, 2009, calling it Mushi-Shi: The Movie.

== Reception ==
In its opening weekend in Japan, Mushishi ranked eighth at the box office. In total, it grossed $4,194,890, making it the 81st best gross of a film released in Japan in 2007. It was nominated at the Venice Film Festival in the best film category and at the Sitges Film Festival in the best film, best special effects, and best soundtrack categories, winning in the latter two. On its exhibition at the Sundance Film Festival, all tickets were sold out, and some people watched it standing because they did not buy reserved seats.

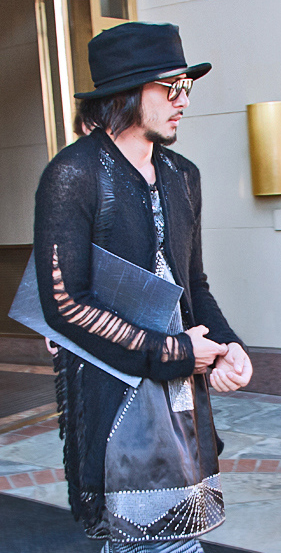
Although the film received mixed reviews, Odagiri's performance was highly praised.

Critical response was mixed. Todd Brown, writing for Twitch Film, characterized the film as "long, slow, fairly pedestrian in its visual style, confusing for the newbies, [and] over-familiar for the existing fan". Anime News Network's Bamboo Dong praised its visuals but noted that the film could be confusing for viewers who are unfamiliar with the manga series and that Ginko "looks more like a cosplayer". Tony Sullivan of Eye for Film said it is "beautifully acted, shot and scored" but cited the "lack of oomph" as a reason why "the movie is rather dull". Mark Schilling from The Japan Times praised Odagiri but criticized the film for being "a text too tangled and murky for the uninitiated to easily penetrate or parse". The cast performance was praised by Variety reviewer Derek Elley who declared its "longueurs and narrative obscurities consign this 'Bug' to highly specialized outings". Sullivan, Schilling, and Elley criticized its soundtrack, especially the use of didgeridoos.

Sally Foster from Film Threat praised its visuals and "a few good Japanese-style creep-out scenes" but described the storyline as "incomprehensible" due to "the overabundance" of information about its mythology. John Sinnott of DVD Talk asserted the film could not reach the quality of the manga; he cited the lack of explanation about Ginko's background as one of the reasons. Sinnott criticized its slow pace considering its duration and said that "there isn't much mystery or suspense." Anthony Enticknap from Den of Geek said its plot is "complex at times, and often drifts into the realms of the incomprehensible". Although he criticized the film's "pedestrian" pace, Enticknap praised Omori's performance as well as the film's cinematography and use of CGI. While praising Odagiri's acting and deeming the film's visuals an "A-game", DVD Verdict's Adam Arseneau said it "feels disjointed and fragmented".

While he preferred the anime version, Mania.com's Chris Beveridge praised the film as "a soothing and atmospheric movie that captures everything that it should", singling out Otomo's direction and Odagiri's acting. Scott Green from Ain't It Cool News wrote that he "didn't find it as breathtaking as Otomo's anime spectacles or as effecting as earlier version of Mushi-Shi", but did "find it a fascinating movie to watch and consider". Joseph Luster from Otaku USA called it "fantastic" though declared Mushishi would not be "nearly as strong without him [Odagiri] in the lead". Kevin Kelly, writing for Cinematical.com, dubbed it "a film not for everyone" because of its storyline's complexity and "unusual type of mythology and storytelling". Kelly concluded, "if you like Japanese cinema, fantasy storytelling, and interesting characters, you'll love this film." Similarly, Justin Howe of Tor.com declared it is "a bit too inert for most people's tastes" but said "Mushishi is a fantasy film that's worth seeing. It's more eerie than scary, often haunting, and occasionally beautiful."
