= Suiiki =

Japanese manga series

- First tankōbon volume cover, featuring Chinami Kawamura

水域
- Genre: Fantasy
- Manga
- Written by: Yuki Urushibara
- Published by: Kodansha
- Imprint: Afternoon KC
- Magazine: Monthly Afternoon
- Original run: November 25, 2009 – October 25, 2010
- Volumes: 2
- icon

Suiiki (Japanese: 水域; lit. 'Waters') is a Japanese manga series written and illustrated by Yuki Urushibara. It was serialized in Kodansha's seinen manga magazine Monthly Afternoon from November 2009 to October 2010, with its chapters collected in two tankōbon volumes.

== Plot ==
Chinami Kawamura is a middle school student on her school's swim team. Her town is in a severe summer drought that has left her town with water restrictions. While practicing in the intense heat, Chinami collapses from heat exhaustion and awakens in a dreamlike riverside village beside a flowing river. There she meets a boy named Sumio and his elderly father.

After regaining consciousness, Chinami repeatedly finds herself drawn back to the same mysterious place whenever she faints. As she explores the village, she begins uncovering its connection to a settlement that was submerged by a dam and to secrets tied to her own family's past.

== Publication ==
Written and illustrated by Yuki Urushibara, Suiiki was serialized in Kodansha's seinen manga magazine Monthly Afternoon from November 25, 2009, to October 25, 2010. Kodansha collected its chapters into two individual tankōbon volumes released on January 21, 2011. On the same day, Kodansha also published the series in two aizoban volumes. Kodansha re-released the series in two shinsōban volumes on May 23, 2018.

=== Volumes ===
| No. | Japanese release date | Japanese ISBN |
|---|---|---|
| 1 | January 21, 2011 | 978-4-06-310724-1 |
| 2 | January 21, 2011 | 978-4-06-310725-8 |
