= Domu: A Child's Dream =

Japanese manga series

- Cover of the Domu tankōbon volume, as published by Futabasha on August 18, 1983

童夢 (Dōmu)
- Manga
- Written by: Katsuhiro Otomo
- Published by: Futabasha
- English publisher: NA: Dark Horse Comics
- Imprint: Action Comics
- Magazine: Action Deluxe
- Original run: January 19, 1980 – July 6, 1981
- Volumes: 1

Domu (Japanese: 童夢, Hepburn: Dōmu) is a Japanese manga series written and illustrated by Katsuhiro Otomo. Similar to his work Akira, the story centers on an old man and a child possessing extrasensory powers. It was serialized weekly between 1980 and 1981 in Futabasha's Action Deluxe, with the chapters collected and published as a tankōbon in 1983. The main inspiration for Domu came partly from an apartment complex Otomo lived in when he first moved to Tokyo, and partly from a news report he heard about a rash of suicides that occurred at a separate apartment.

Domu won an excellence award at the 1981 Japan Cartoonists Association Award, was the first manga to win the Nihon SF Taisho Award, and won the 1984 Seiun Award for Best Comic. It was released in English for the North American market by Dark Horse Comics, initially in a per-volume basis in 1995 and then compiled in trade paperback form in 1996 (reissued 2001), and was one of Dark Horse Comics' top sellers for that year.

== Synopsis ==
Mr. Ueno, a tenant of the tower block apartments at the Tsutsumi Housing Complex, jumps from the roof of one of the buildings in an apparent suicide. His is the latest of the thirty-two mysterious deaths that have taken place there in only three years. Inspector Yamagawa and Inspector Takayama investigate the death and find that it was impossible for Mr. Ueno to get on the roof, as the lock of the access door has long been rusted shut.

Yamagawa interviews the complex's manager and is told of a few residents that have caused problems with in the past, including Mrs. Tezuka, an eccentric woman who was sent to a mental hospital after a miscarriage; Yoshio Fujiyama, nicknamed "Little Yo", a strong but mentally disabled man who was accused of child molestation by other residents; and Yoshikawa, an abusive alcoholic. The manager also mentions Chojiro Uchida, nicknamed "Old Cho", a senile old man who lives alone.

Upon returning to the police station, Yamagawa interviews a housewife who saw Mr. Ueno before his death, walking in an apparent trance past her apartment. She mentions that he wore a strange baseball cap with wings sewn on. During a later interview with Mr. Ueno's wife and son, the detectives learn that the cap went missing following his death. When a patrolman jumps from the complex with his pistol missing, Yamagawa tells his men to see if any of the victims' possessions vanished after their deaths.

Yamagawa goes back to the housing complex that night. After his pager goes off, Yamagawa calls the police station only to learn they didn't contact him. He realizes that the killer is watching him and offers the beeper as a trophy. To his fright, however, the beeper suddenly explodes. Yamagawa is pursued and taunted by the killer in a pursuit that leads him to the roof. There, he meets Old Cho, floating in the air and possessing trophies from his many victims, including Mr. Ueno's winged hat. Yamagawa is later found to have jumped off the building.

The following day, a new girl named Etsuko moves into the complex with her family. When Old Cho uses his powers to drop a baby off a balcony, Etsuko uses her own psychic talents to save his life. She confronts Old Cho about the deed, repelling his attempted attack. Later, Etsuko makes friends with Little Yo and Hiroshi, Yoshikawa's son. Meanwhile, Inspector Okamura, an old colleague of Yamagawa's, visits the complex. Okamura sees a ghostly apparition of Yamagawa; Takayama later sees a similar apparition. Old Cho levels a psychic attack on Okamura and tells him to never come back.

After leaving a playdate with Hiroshi and Little Yo, Etsuko is attacked by Tsutomu Sasaki, a young man who has been possessed by Old Cho. Old Cho makes Sasaki slit his own throat with a utility knife, traumatizing Etsuko. The following night, as Yoshikawa hangs out in the complex courtyard, Old Cho offers him the dead patrolman's pistol.

In the morning, Takayama visits a professor to get his expert opinion on the recent events, as well as any information on Japanese shamanism. The professor refers Takayama to a practicing shaman named Noriko Nonomura. After Takayama meets with Nonomura, they travel to the housing complex to let her examine it for signs of supernatural power. At the moment of their arrival, Old Cho and Etsuko are having a psychic battle; Nonomura realizes that the children in the complex are the objects of Old Cho's madness, and tells Takayama to watch out for them at all costs. Takayama fails to understand the warning.

Meanwhile, a policeman appears at Old Cho's apartment regarding his patio doors, which were shattered when Etsuko was attacked. The policeman and the manager are surprised to find the residence completely empty, save for a ring the policeman finds near the patio doors.

Later, Old Cho possesses Yoshikawa and kills a young boy, before going after Etsuko. When Hiroshi and Little Yo wander into the scene, Yoshikawa shoots Little Yo and, later, kills Hiroshi. Sensing Old Cho on the roof, Etsuko teleports to face him. This leads to a gigantic battle across the apartment complex. Etsuko then has a mental breakdown when Old Cho blows up a building with a gas main, killing many children that were witnessing the battle on their balconies; Little Yo and Mrs. Tezuka are killed as the building collapses. Overwhelmed by Etsuko's power, a terrified Old Cho flees the scene. Etsuko's powers kill two firemen and cause more damage before she is calmed down by the presence of her mother.

In the aftermath, Yoshikawa is blamed by the media for the tragedy. Old Cho is taken into custody, but Okamura gathers very little information. After being given another psychic attack by Old Cho, Takayama begins keeping watch on him. While doing so in the complex's courtyard, Etsuko enters the scene and focuses her powers against Old Cho. He is easily overwhelmed in a mental battle with only relatively subtle physical manifestations and dies of an apparent heart attack. Etsuko then teleports from the scene, leaving Takayama clueless as to how Old Cho died.

== Characters ==
- Chojiro Uchida (内田 長二郎) - also known as "Old Cho" (チョウさん, Chō-san), he is a senile old man who lives at the housing complex. Old Cho has psychic powers which he uses to murder other occupants of the complex. His apparent motive for the killings is to possess an item belonging to the victim, which Old Cho then takes as trophies. The old man believes that his murders and the chaos resulting from his actions are more like children's games than actual wrongdoings, and he often acts like an immature child.
- Etsuko (悦子) - also known as "Ecchan" (エッちゃん), a young girl who moves into the housing complex with her family. Etsuko also has an immense battery of psychic powers and uses them to battle with Old Cho and stop his reign of terror against the housing complex.
- Inspector Yamagawa (山川部長) - a senior police detective who acts as the first lead investigator on the case until his death at Old Cho's hands.
- Inspector Okamura (岡村部長) - the second lead investigator on the case, replacing Inspector Yamagawa. He was once a close, longtime colleague of Yamagawa's.
- Takayama (高山) - a young detective helping Inspector Yamagawa and later Inspector Okamura with the investigation.
- Tsutomu Sasaki (佐々木 勉) - a young resident who has tried unsuccessfully to get into college for the previous three years, but spends his time building model airplanes when he should be studying.
- Yoshio Fujiyama (藤山 良夫) - also known as "Little Yo" (ヨッちゃん, Yo-chan), he is a large, physically strong, yet intellectually disabled man who lives with his mother in the complex. He was once accused of child molestation by other complex residents. Becomes friends with Hiroshi and Etsuko, and dies trying to catch Hiroshi's falling body.
- Yoshikawa - a former truck driver, he is a hard-core alcoholic whose abusive relationship with his wife caused her to leave both him and their son, Hiroshi. He seems to neglect his son, and instead lies around his apartment extremely intoxicated when not outside. Is possessed by Old Cho in an attempt to kill Etsuko, but ends up being killed by Little Yo.
- Hiroshi Yoshikawa (吉川 ひろし) - Yoshikawa's son who is also a friend of Etsuko and Little Yo. Ends up killed by a possessed Yoshikawa.
- Mrs. Tezuka (手塚夫人) - a woman who lives at the complex, known for disturbing behavior, such as walking around the complex driving an empty stroller. Mrs. Tezuka was once confined in a mental hospital, after what was perhaps a nervous breakdown following a miscarriage. Killed by falling debris during Etsuko and Old Cho's fight.

The inspectors Yamagawa and Takayama both appear in an earlier one-shot by Otomo, namely Ashita no Yakusoku, which involved the pair yet again as head inspectors on a bizarre murder case.

== Production ==
As a child Otomo loved science fiction, but described "almost all manga" in the late 1970s as either gekiga or sports manga. Him wanting to recreate the childhood excitement that he felt while reading science fiction, "was in part how something like Domu came about." Fireball was Otomo's first science fiction manga, during the creation of which he saw the film The Exorcist and became inspired to add a touch of horror to his next work, Domu. He took this horror element from the Takashimadaira apartment complex in northern Tokyo, which was known at the time for over 40 cases of people committing suicide by jumping from its large apartment buildings.

Otomo said that he wrote Domu like he would a film, "It's like the storyboard for one entire film." While drawing Domu and trying to figure out the "grammar" of manga, he was flipping through an issue of Big Comic at a soba shop in Kichijōji and came across Tetsuya Chiba's Notari Matsutarō. Otomo said its pacing was just what he was looking for and he studied Chiba's works out of admiration.

The character nicknamed Ecchan is an homage to Shotaro Ishinomori's Sarutobi Ecchan.

== Reception ==
Domu won the Excellence Award at the 1981 Japan Cartoonists Association Awards, became the first manga to win the Nihon SF Taisho Award in 1983, and won the 1984 Seiun Award for Best Comic. In 2025, Naoki Urasawa opined that there were two big impacts in the history of manga; the first was Osamu Tezuka's Shin Takarajima in 1947, and the second was Domu. He further said, "The manga that we read today would not be in its current form if Otomo's Domu had not been published. [...] All manga artists from our generation onwards have had their lives changed by Domu." Taiyō Matsumoto for example stated he decided to become a manga artist after reading Domu.

Shaenon K. Garrity called Domu one of her all-time favorite manga and, with its similar themes of psychic powers and "generational conflicts, its similar imagery of buildings exploding and bodies twisting in hyper-realistic detail," in many ways a test run for Otomo's Akira. However, Garrity prefers Domu due to its single volume length trimming the story down to the essentials and for never losing sight of its human element by sticking to a single group of people in an apartment complex. She wrote that early on the art is sometimes stiff and generic, but it always has meticulous architectural details. Garrity called the "nearly wordless 24-page [ending] sequence in which almost nothing, externally, happens," one of the best pieces of comics storytelling ever drawn. She ended with, "Otomo at the beginning of Domu is a very good cartoonist, but by the end he's one of the geniuses of the form."

Manga Bookshelf's Katherine Dacey opined that while Akira and Domu both include elements of horror and science fiction, the two "are utterly different in approach"; describing the former as sweeping, grand, and allegorical, and Domu as a compact and taut psychological thriller. While she found the art in Akira to be "a bit dated," Dacey called the art in Domu "less mired in the 1980s" and praised the character art as refreshingly realistic. Barb Lien-Cooper of Sequential Tart described Domu as half-Akira and half-Mai, the Psychic Girl in both writing style and art, and called it creepy "character driven, intelligent reading." Although she felt the ending was not as fascinating as "its truly nail-biting start," Lien-Cooper called Domu a "darned good" mini-series. Although praising the story as original and the character Uchida as genuinely disturbing, Keith Rhee of Ex.org felt that Otomo's art style may not be for everyone. He finished his review by writing, "Not many stories in anime manage to genuinely horrify people, and if you're into terror, this should be well worth your time."

Anime News Network's Justin Sevakis wrote that many shōnen manga artists cite Domu as the reason they became artists. Yuto Suzuki, author of Sakamoto Days, is one of them. Satoshi Kon, who started his career as an assistant to Otomo in both manga and anime, cited Domu as an influence and once said that "if I were allowed to make just one movie from among all the manga I'd read, that would be it." Seiji Horibuchi, founder of American manga publisher Viz Media, cited Domu as one of the series that got him into manga. Director Rian Johnson pointed out similarities between how telekinesis is depicted in Domu and its depiction in his film Looper.

== Media adaptations ==
In June 1984, a year after the tankobon release, King Records released a soundtrack of Domu for a planned movie, composed by Kazuhiko Izu.

In the 1990s, Bandai were trying to get the rights to adapt Domu into a live-action film. They told production director Nilo Rodis-Jamero, who was in Japan for a separate project on behalf of Lucasfilm, that if he could get Otomo to agree, they would pay for everything. After Otomo approved a film treatment, Rodis-Jamero began writing a script and recruited David Lynch to direct. Otomo liked the script and Bandai gave the production a 12-month turn around; where shooting had to occur within 12 months or the rights would revert to Bandai. Rodis-Jamero and Lynch took the project to Propaganda Films, but Rodis-Jamero said the relationship between the director and Propaganda was strained. Rodis-Jamero said that with Propaganda trying to swipe the deal away from him and Lynch, and his attorney advising him that a 12-month turn around was not going to happen, he walked away from the project.

In 1999, an adaptation by Touchstone Pictures with Guillermo del Toro directing was reported to be in the works. In 2006, Otomo revealed that there were problems with the producer and that he did not know what the current status of the film was, but stated, "I gave Del Toro the rights, though, so as far as I'm concerned, if it ever gets made, he is the one who will make it." This was later transferred back to Bandai Pictures once again, and Otomo produced a seven-minute pilot film that was released at the Angouleme Festival in 2016, and at the Niigata International Animation Film Festival in 2023.
