= Hipira =

Japanese manga and anime series

- The cover of Hipira

ヒピラくん (Hipira-kun)
- Genre: Comedy, Supernatural
- Manga
- Written by: Katsuhiro Otomo
- Illustrated by: Shinji Kimura
- Published by: Shufu-to-Seikatsu Sha Ltd.
- English publisher: US: Dark Horse Comics
- Published: September 2002
- Volumes: 1
- Anime television series
- Directed by: Shinji Kimura
- Music by: Conisch
- Studio: Sunrise
- Original network: NHK BS-2
- Original run: December 21, 2009 – December 25, 2009
- Episodes: 12

Hipira: The Little Vampire (ヒピラくん, Hipira-kun) is a manga-style story book written by Katsuhiro Otomo and illustrated by Shinji Kimura. The manga is licensed in English by Dark Horse Comics. The manga was adapted into an anime and broadcast on NHK BS-2 from December 21–25, 2009.

== Media ==
=== Manga ===
Shufu-to-Seikatsu Sha Ltd. released the manga in September 2002. The manga is licensed in English by Dark Horse Comics, which released the manga on August 24, 2005. Casterman released the manga on October 17, 2007.

=== Anime ===
The manga was adapted into an anime and broadcast on NHK BS-2's BS Fuyu Yasumi Anime Tokusen program for five consecutive days starting from December 21, 2009. The anime featured Yumiko Kobayashi as Hipira, Sayaka Ohara as Soul, Bin Shimada as Chōrō, Chihiro Suzuki as Georuge and Ayumi Fujimura as Erena.

== Reception ==
Newtype USA magazine commends Shinji Kimura's artwork saying that his illustrations are both "creepy and cute".
