= The Legend of Mother Sarah =

Japanese manga series

- The cover of the first volume of The Legend of Mother Sarah.

沙流羅 (Sāra)
- Genre: Sci-fi
- Manga
- Written by: Katsuhiro Otomo
- Illustrated by: Takumi Nagayasu
- Published by: Kodansha
- English publisher: NA: Dark Horse Comics
- Magazine: Weekly Young Magazine
- Original run: 1990 – 2004
- Volumes: 7

The Legend of Mother Sarah (沙流羅, Sāra) is a manga written by Katsuhiro Otomo and illustrated by Takumi Nagayasu. The series combines elements of post-apocalyptic adventure, political conflict, and human drama, exploring themes of survival, motherhood, displacement, war, and perseverance in a shattered world.

== Publication history ==
The Legend of Mother Sarah was originally published in Kodansha's Weekly Young Magazine from January 15, 1990, to April 26, 2004, with chapters appearing intermittently. The total story was encompassed in 5 parts, collected in 7 tankōbon.

The English-language edition was published by Dark Horse Comics from 1996 to 1998 in seven volumes, while French, Spanish, German, Italian, and Portuguese editions were published by Delcourt (1997–2005), Norma Editorial (1998–1999), Carlsen Comics (1998–2001), Play Press Publishing (1998–2000; later republished by Panini Comics in 2004–2005), and Meribérica/Liber (c. 1998–1999), respectively. Because the manga continued to appear intermittently in Japan until 2004, several foreign editions remained incomplete.

== Plot ==
The Legend of Mother Sarah is set in a post-apocalyptic future after a devastating war leaves Earth environmentally ruined and much of humanity displaced into space colonies. Those who remain on Earth struggle to survive amid social collapse, armed conflict, and competition over dwindling resources.

The story follows Sarah, a mother separated from her husband and children during a military evacuation following the destruction of her colony settlement. Determined to reunite her family, Sarah embarks on a long journey across the devastated planet. Armed with a rifle and accompanied at times by allies and fellow travelers, she crosses deserts, ruined cities, isolated settlements, and territories controlled by violent factions.

As Sarah searches for her children, she encounters survivors living under different forms of oppression, including militarized communities, exploitative local rulers, criminal groups, and remnants of larger political powers competing to shape the future of human civilization. Many episodes focus on self-contained conflicts involving displaced people, refugees, soldiers, and children struggling to survive in the harsh environment.

Throughout the series, Sarah develops a reputation as a determined and formidable wanderer. Although driven primarily by her personal mission to reunite her family, she repeatedly becomes involved in the struggles of people she encounters, acting against injustice and violence despite the risks to herself.
