= Yuto Nakano =

Japanese voice actor

Yuto Nakano 中野裕斗
- Born: June 4, 1967 (age 59); Chiba, Japan
- Occupation: Voice actor
- Notable credit: Mushi-Shi as Ginko

Yuto Nakano (中野裕斗, Nakano Yūto; born June 4, 1967) is a Japanese voice actor from Chiba, Japan. He is part of Riki Project, a Japanese talent office run by Riki Takeuchi. He debuted in Ojarumaru, a Japanese manga series adapted for television, in 2004.

Yūto is best known for his role as Ginko in the anime television series Mushishi.

== Filmography ==
=== Anime ===
- Mushi-Shi (2005–14), Ginko

=== Dubbing ===
- The Mule, Gustavo (Clifton Collins Jr.)
