= Notari Matsutarō =

Japanese manga series

- The cover of the first volume of Notari Matsutarō

のたり松太郎
- Genre: Sports
- Manga
- Written by: Tetsuya Chiba
- Published by: Shogakukan
- Magazine: Big Comic
- Original run: August 1973 – March 1998
- Volumes: 36
- Original video animation
- Directed by: Yoshio Takeuchi
- Written by: Seiji Matsuoka; Shun'ichi Yukimuro; Tadaaki Yamazaki
- Music by: Takanori Arisawa
- Studio: Mushi Production; Big Bang (ep. 3–10)
- Released: November 22, 1990 – April 25, 1991
- Runtime: 28 minutes (each)
- Episodes: 10
- Anime television series

Rowdy Sumo Wrestler Matsutaro!!
- Directed by: Yukio Kaizawa
- Produced by: Tomohiro Tsuji (TV Asahi); Kei Mizutani (TV Asahi); Gyarmath Bogdan
- Written by: Takatsuji Yamatoya
- Music by: Tatsumi Yano
- Studio: Toei Animation
- Original network: ANN (TV Asahi)
- Original run: April 6, 2014 – September 28, 2014
- Episodes: 23

Notari Matsutarō (のたり松太郎; "Carefree Matsutarō") is a Japanese sports manga series about sumo wrestling. It is written and illustrated by Tetsuya Chiba.

== Plot ==
Matsutarou Sakaguchi is lazy and quick tempered. As a result, he is stuck in middle school even though he is an adult. One day he gets in a fight with a sumo wrestler and they take the fight to a sumo ring. The attending sumo stable masters are impressed by Sakaguchi's strength and convince Sakaguchi to come to Tokyo. Sakaguchi has an ulterior motive though. A teacher he has a crush on, Reiko Minami recently moved to Tokyo and the sumo stable is close to her home. Sakaguchi begins training and competing in sumo while dreaming of the day he can marry Reiko.

== Publication ==
Notari Matsutarō was serialized by Shogakukan in Big Comic magazine from August 1973 to June 1993, then after a hiatus it returned from October 1995 to March 1998. From 1995 to 1998, Tarō Nami was also responsible for the storyboard of the series. The complete series was originally encapsulated into 36 tankōbon volumes by Shogakukan between March 1976 and March 2000. It has been republished twice; 8 volumes were released between 1988 and 1991, and 22 volumes were published in 2003–2004.

No.	Title	Release date	ISBN
1	Notari Jōkyō su! (のたり上京す!)	March 1976	4-09-180071-8
2	Pātonā, Tanaka-kun Tōjō! (相棒、田中君登場!)	March 1976	4-09-180072-6
3	Notari, Hatsu Dohyō! (のたり、初土俵!)	April 1976	4-09-180073-4
4	Notari, Shitsuren su!! (のたり、失恋す!!)	April 1976	4-09-180074-2
5	Abekku Tōhikō! (アベック逃避行!)	June 1976	4-09-180075-0
6	Kizudarake no Fukki (傷だらけの復帰)	November 1976	4-09-180076-9
7	Dai Rantō no Ageku (大乱闘のあげく)	May 1977	4-09-180077-7
8	Mitsu Domo e! (三つどもえ!)	December 1977	4-09-180078-5
9	Hinkyaku Tōrai! (貧客到来!)	May 1979	4-09-180079-3
10	Gorufu de Hassan! (ゴルフで発散!)	June 1979	4-09-180080-7
11	Akutsu, Nyūmon! (阿久津、入門!)	November 1979	4-09-180221-4
12	Ashita no Matsutarō! (あしたの松太郎!)	December 1979	4-09-180222-2
13	Matsu, Dai Funsen su! (松、大糞戦す!)	July 1980	4-09-180223-0
14	Yotari no Matsutarō! (よたりの松太郎!)	February 1981	4-09-180224-9
15	Notari, Ransen Moyō! (のたり、乱戦模様!)	September 1981	4-09-180225-7
16	Moete, Koronde! (燃えて、転んで!)	August 1982	4-09-180226-5
17	Bariki no Matsu! Chiryoku no Tanaka! (馬力の松!地力の田中!)	October 1982	4-09-180227-3
18	Ooichou! Daibaran!! (大銀杏!大波乱!!)	January 1985	4-09-180228-1
19	Notari, Tsuini Nyūmaku! (のたり、ついに入幕!)	February 1985	4-09-180229-X
20	Matsutarō, Henshin su! (松太郎、変身す!)	November 1985	4-09-180230-3
21	Kairiki Matsu, Kaichō!! (怪力松、快調!!)	March 1986	4-09-180871-9
22	Notari, Yūshō su!! (怪力松、快調!!)	September 1986	4-09-180872-7
23	Akogare no Reiko sensei (憧れの令子先生)	May 1992	4-09-180873-5
24	Matsutarō ni Nijū no Iwai!? (松太郎に二重の祝い!?)	June 1992	4-09-180874-3
25	Matsutarō oni ni naru!! (松太郎オニになる!!)	September 1992	4-09-180875-1
26	Matsutarō Chichioya ni Naru!! (松太郎父親になる!!)	June 1996	4-09-180876-X
27	Kobu Tsuki Matsu, Abare Matsu!! (コブつき松、暴れ松!!)	November 1996	4-09-180877-8
28	Notari no Yaru Ki? (のたりのヤル気?)	June 1997	4-09-180878-6
29	Zenshō Taiketsu Aragoma vs. Takanohana!! (全勝対決荒駒vs.貴ノ華!!)	September 1997	4-09-180879-4
30	Matsutarō, Tadaima Kyūjō-chū! (松太郎、ただいま休場中!)	May 1998	4-09-180880-8
31	Matsu, Saishidō su!! (松、再始動す!!)	August 1998	4-09-185081-2
32	Matsutarō Seisan su!? (松太郎清算す!?)	January 1999	4-09-185082-0
33	Koma Tanaka Funtō-hen 1 (駒田中奮闘編①)	May 1999	4-09-185083-9
34	Koma Tanaka Funtō-hen 2 (駒田中奮闘編②)	August 1999	4-09-185084-7
35	Koma Tanaka Funtō-hen 3 (駒田中奮闘編③)	November 1999	4-09-185085-5
36	Koma Tanaka Funtō-hen 4 (駒田中奮闘編④)	March 2000	4-09-185086-3

== Adaptations ==
It was adapted as a series of ten original video animations (OVA) released between November 22, 1990, and April 25, 1991. It was directed by Yoshio Takeuchi and its ending theme, "Yokozuna" (横綱), was performed by Ikuzo Yoshi.

A television series titled Rowdy Sumo Wrestler Matsutaro!! (暴れん坊力士!!松太郎, Abarenbō Rikishi!! Matsutarō), with lead character Matsutarō Sakuguchi voiced by Ken Matsudaira, began broadcast on TV Asahi affiliates on April 6, 2014. It was also streamed on Crunchyroll for, among others, English-language countries United States, Canada, South Africa, Australia, New Zealand, and United Kingdom. Yukio Kaizawa directed the series that was produced by Tomohiro Tsuji from TV Asahi and Gyarmath Bogdan from Toei Animation.

== Reception ==
Notari Matsutaro received the 1978 Shogakukan Manga Award for seinen/general manga. Katsuhiro Otomo cited the pacing of Notari Matsutarō as an influence, particularly on his series Domu.

== See also ==
- Aah! Harimanada
- Salaryman Kintaro
