= Fireball (manga) =

Unfinished science fiction manga by Katsuhiro Otomo

- Genre: Supernatural, science fiction
- Manga
- Written by: Katsuhiro Otomo
- Published by: Futabasha
- Magazine: Action Deluxe
- Published: January 27, 1979

Fireball (stylized as Fire-Ball) is an unfinished Japanese science fiction manga written and illustrated by Katsuhiro Otomo. The 50-page story was published in Futabasha's Action Deluxe magazine on January 27, 1979. Fireball is notable for establishing ground Otomo would later explore more successfully in Domu and his best-known work Akira. It was later collected in Otomo's 1990 short story collection Kanojo no Omoide..., which was published in English as Memories: The Collection.

== Plot ==
The governance of a futuristic city is secretly handled by a supercomputer called ATOM, and publicly by a ruthless female director whom ATOM refers to as "Mama". A group of freedom fighters attempt to expose and sabotage the system.

One of the freedom fighters has an elder brother, with whom he has lost contact, who works for the director's riot police. This elder brother possesses moderate psychic abilities such as the power to briefly levitate a pen. The director learns of this and recruits the nascent psychic for an 'experiment' which entails connecting his brain and nervous system to ATOM, stripping away much of his body in the process. Throughout this the subject is seen to inhabit a blissful womblike existence from his perspective.

The freedom fighter brother attempts to infiltrate the government base but is shot by security. Sensing this, the psychic brother wakes from anesthetic and uses his powers to superheat his surroundings and levitate the remnants of his physical body from the workbench, effectively becoming the center of a vengeful destructive sun: the 'Fireball' of the story's title.

== Production ==
Fireball was written in 1978. Otomo claimed to grow weary of the story "after about page 20", and stated that, due to a lack of planning, he had to hastily end Fireball without using the finale he wanted. He named the main computer ATOM as an homage to Osamu Tezuka's character of the same name.

Otomo conceived the plot of Domu as a potentially stronger work retaining the theme of psychic superpowers. He also expanded on the psychic element and that of freedom fighters in his epic Akira. Otomo stated, "You could say that Akira was born from the frustration I had about" having to end Fireball prematurely. "The story's different from Fireball, but I wanted to build it up in the same way, so I went into more story detail in my preparations for Akira. No matter what, I wanted to draw exactly the finale I wanted."

== Reception ==
In The Essential Guide to World Comics, Brad Brooks and Tim Pilcher wrote that Fireball changed traditional manga forever by breaking all the rules with a unique art style.

== English reprints ==
- Otomo, K. (1994) Memories: The Collection, London - Mandarin Press. ISBN 0-7493-9687-3
- Otomo, K. (1995) Memories, Random House Australia. ISBN 978-0-7493-9687-9
