= Mushishi =

Japanese manga series

- First tankōbon volume cover, featuring Ginko

蟲師
- Genre: Adventure; Iyashikei; Supernatural
- Manga
- Written by: Yuki Urushibara
- Published by: Kodansha
- English publisher: NA: Del Rey Manga; Kodansha USA (digital)
- Imprint: Afternoon KC
- Magazine: Afternoon Season Zōkan; (October 10, 1999 – October 10, 2002); Monthly Afternoon; (December 25, 2002 – August 25, 2008)
- Original run: October 10, 1999 – August 25, 2008
- Volumes: 10
- Anime television series

Mushi-Shi
- Directed by: Hiroshi Nagahama
- Written by: Hiroshi Nagahama
- Music by: Toshio Masuda
- Studio: Artland
- Licensed by: AUS: Madman Entertainment; NA: Funimation; UK: Revelation Films
- Original network: Fuji TV, BS Fuji
- Original run: October 23, 2005 (Note: As stated on the official website, Mushi-Shi officially premiered on October 22, 2005, at 27:45 a.m. (October 23, 3:45 a.m.). By consequence, Fuji Television's broadcasting ends actually on March 12, 2006, instead of March 11.) – June 19, 2006
- Episodes: 26
Further information
Anime television series
Mushi-Shi -Next Passage-
Directed by	Kōichirō Sōtome (chief); Hiroshi Nagahama
Written by	Hiroshi Nagahama
Music by	Toshio Masuda
Studio	Artland
Licensed by	AUS: Madman Entertainment; NA: Aniplex of America
Original network	Tokyo MX, GTV, BS11
Original run	April 5, 2014 (Note: As stated on the official website, Mushi-Shi -Next Passage- officially premiered on April 4, 2014 at 24:00 (April 5, midnight). By consequence, the "first half's" broadcasting ends actually on June 21, 2014, instead of June 20, and the series ends December 21, instead of December 20.) – December 21, 2014
Episodes	20
Anime television specials
Mushi-Shi: The Shadow That Devours the Sun (2014); Mushi-Shi -Next Passage-: Path of Thorns (2014)
Anime film
Mushi-Shi -Next Passage-: Bell Droplets
Directed by	Hiroshi Nagahama
Written by	Hiroshi Nagahama
Music by	Toshio Masuda
Studio	Artland
Released	May 16, 2015
Runtime	46 minutes
- Live-action film
- Mushishi (2006)
- icon

Mushishi (Japanese: 蟲師; lit. 'Insect Master') is a Japanese manga series written and illustrated by Yuki Urushibara. It was serialized in Kodansha's seinen manga magazines Afternoon Season Zōkan from October 1999 to October 2002, and in Monthly Afternoon from December 2002 to August 2008. The individual chapters were collected and released into ten tankōbon volumes by Kodansha. Those volumes were localized to North America by Del Rey between January 2007 and August 2010. The series follows Ginko, a man who dedicates himself to solving problems caused by supernatural creatures called Mushi.

Mushishi was adapted into an anime television series by Artland, which aired in Fuji Television and BS Fuji between October 2005 and June 2006. It has been licensed by Funimation for release in North America, while Madman Entertainment and Revelation Films licensed it for Australia and the United Kingdom respectively. A second anime series aired between April and December 2014, which has been licensed in North America by Aniplex of America, with two television specials airing in 2014 and an anime film released in 2015. A live-action film, directed by Katsuhiro Otomo, was released in late 2006. It has also spawned a video game and many types of merchandise.

The Mushishi manga has been well-received by both critics and audiences. In Japan, it has frequently ranked in the weekly top ten list of best-selling manga, and the entire series has sold over 3.8 million copies. Both the manga and the anime have received several awards, such as the Kodansha Manga Award and the Tokyo Anime Award.

== Plot ==
Mushishi is set in an imaginary time between the Edo and Meiji periods, featuring some 19th-century technology but with Japan still as a "closed country". The story features ubiquitous creatures called Mushi (蟲) that often display what appear as supernatural powers. It is implied that there are many more primitive lifeforms than normal living things such as animals, plants, fungi, and bacteria, and Mushi is the most primitive of all. Due to their ethereal nature, most humans are incapable of perceiving Mushi and are oblivious to their existence, but there are a few who possess the ability to see and interact with Mushi. One such person is Ginko (ギンコ), the main character of the series voiced by Yuto Nakano in the original version and by Travis Willingham in the English dub. He employs himself as a Mushi Master (蟲師, Mushi-shi), traveling from place to place to research Mushi and aid people suffering from problems caused by them.

The series is an episodic anthology with no overarching plotline in which the only common elements are Ginko and the Mushi. Ginko is a man with one green eye, who not only can see various types of mushi but also attracts them. Because of this ability, he is constantly wandering and smokes cigarettes made from a special Mushi Tobacco (蟲煙草, Mushi tabako; or Mushi Soot Grass) in order to keep the mushi away. He appears to have a generally laid back personality, however, he can be very serious and focused on his work when it comes to protecting people from mushi. He stresses that the mushi are not evil, but merely trying to survive like everyone else. A majority of the stories do not focus on Ginko but rely on him as a catalyst to move the story forward by diagnosing or curing mushi-related illnesses and phenomena.

== Media ==
=== Manga ===
Written and illustrated by Yuki Urushibara, Mushishi was first published as a one-shot in Kodansha's seinen manga magazine Monthly Afternoon on January 25, 1999, after it won the Grand Prize of the Winter 1998 Afternoon Shiki Shō (アフタヌーン四季賞; 'Afternoon Four Seasons Award'). It later started its serialization in the first issue of Kodansha's Afternoon Season Zōkan, released on October 10, 1999. The magazine ceased publication after 14 issues on October 10, 2002, and the series moved to Monthly Afternoon on December 25, 2002, where it was serialized until August 25, 2008. Kodansha collected the chapters into ten tankōbon volumes, published under the Afternoon KC line, from November 22, 2000, to November 21, 2008. On November 21, 2013, Kodansha began re-releasing the series in an aizōban format in their KC Deluxe line, concluding with the tenth on July 23, 2014.

At the 2006 San Diego Comic-Con, Del Rey Manga announced that it had licensed Mushishi for an English-language translation in North America. Del Rey published the first volume on January 30, 2007, and the last volume, a combined edition covering volumes 8 to 10, was released on July 27, 2010. Kodansha USA also released the manga in digital format between July 29 and August 12, 2014. In February 2025, Kodansha USA announced that it would publish the series in an omnibus collector's edition, with the first volume released on November 4 of that same year. As of September 22, 2026, three omnibus volumes have been released. The fourth and fifth volumes will release on December 15, 2026, and June 15, 2027, respectively.

In addition, two new chapters were published in Monthly Afternoon on November 25 and December 25, 2013, respectively. They were compiled into a single tankōbon volume titled Mushishi Tokubetsu-hen: Hihamukage (蟲師 特別篇 日蝕む翳; lit. 'Mushishi Special: The Shadow That Devours the Sun'), released on April 23, 2014. Another short story, titled Mushishi Bangai Tanpen: Chikakeru Kage (蟲師 番外短編 地翔る影; lit. 'Mushishi Extra Short Story: The Shadow That Soars Through Land'), was published in Monthly Afternoon on March 25, 2021.

==== Volumes ====
No.	Original release date	Original ISBN	English release date	English ISBN
1	November 22, 2000	978-4-06-314255-6	January 30, 2007	978-0-345-49621-8
1. "The Green Gathering" (緑の座, Midori no Za); 2. "The Soft Horns" (柔らかい角, Yawarakai Tsuno); 3. "The Pillow Path" (枕小路, Makurano Kōji); 4. "The Light in the Eyelids" (瞼の光, Mabuta no Hikari); 5. "The Traveling Bog" (旅をする沼, Tabi o Suru Numa)
2	February 22, 2002	978-4-06-314284-6	May 1, 2007	978-0-345-49644-7
6. "The Mountain Sleeps" (やまねむる, Ya Ma Nemuru); 7. "The Sea of Brushstrokes" (筆の海, Fude no Umi); 8. "They That Breathe Ephemeral Life" (露を吸う群, Tsuyu o Sū Mure); 9. "Rain Comes and a Rainbow Is Born" (雨がくる虹がたつ, Ame ga Kuru Niji ga Tatsu); 10. "The Veil Spore" (綿胞子, Watabōshi)
3	December 20, 2002	978-4-06-314312-6	February 19, 2008	978-0-345-49645-4
11. "The Cry of Rust" (錆の鳴く聲, Sabi no Naku Koe); 12. "Where Land Meets Sea" (海境より, Umi Sakai Yori); 13. "The Heavy Seed" (重い実, Omoi Mi); 14. "The White Within the Inkstone" (硯に棲む白, Suzuri ni Sumu Shiro); 15. "The One-Eyed Fish" (眇の魚, Sugame no Uo)
4	October 23, 2003	978-4-06-314332-4	May 20, 2008	978-0-345-49923-3
16. "Those Who Pick Empty Cocoons" (虚繭取り, Uro Mayutori); 17. "The One-Night Bridge" (一夜橋, Hitoyobashi); 18. "False Promises of Spring" (春と嘯く, Haru to Usobuku); 19. "In the Cage" (籠のなか, Kago no Naka); 20. "Footsteps in the Grass" (草を踏む音, Kusa o Fumu Oto)
5	October 22, 2004	978-4-06-314361-4	August 26, 2008	978-0-345-50138-7
21. "The Sea Palace" (沖つ宮, Okitsumiya); 22. "Eye's Fortune, Eye's Misfortune" (眼福眼禍, Ganpukuganka); 23. "The Coat That Holds a Mountain" (山抱く衣, Yama Daku Koromo); 24. "Flames of the Fields" (篝野行, Kagarinokō); 25. "The Snake of Dawn" (暁の蛇, Akatsuki no Hebi)
6	June 23, 2005	978-4-06-314381-2	November 25, 2008	978-0-345-50166-0
26. "Heaven's Thread" (天辺の糸, Tenpennoito); 27. "The Chirping Shell" (囀る貝, Saezuru Kai); 28. "The Hand That Pets the Night" (夜を撫でる手, Yoru o Naderu Te); 29. "Under the Snow" (雪の下, Yuki no Shita); 30. "Banquet in the Farthest Field" (野末の宴, Nozue no Utage)
7	February 23, 2006	978-4-06-314404-8	May 19, 2009	978-0-345-50559-0
31. "Lost in Blossoms" (花惑い, Hanamadoi); 32. "The Mirror in the Muck" (鏡が淵, Kagami ga Fuchi); 33. "At the Foot of Lightning" (雷の袂, Ikazuchi no Tamoto); 34. "The Ragged Road (Part 1)" (棘のみち (前編), Odoro no Michi (Zenpen)); 35. "The Ragged Road (Part 2)" (棘のみち (後編), Odoro no Michi (Kōhen))
8	February 23, 2007	978-4-06-314442-0	July 27, 2010	978-0-345-50560-6
36. "The Milk of the Valley" (潮わく谷, Ushio Waku Tani); 37. "The Bottom of Winter" (冬の底, Fuyu no Soko); 38. "The Hidden Channel" (隠り江, Komorie); 39. "Sunshowers" (日照る雨, Hi Teru Ame); 40. "The Mud Weeds" (泥の草, Doro no Kusa)
9	February 22, 2008	978-4-06-314488-8	July 27, 2010	978-0-345-50560-6
41. "The Final Bit of Crimson" (残り紅, Nokori Beni); 42. "The Whirlwind" (風巻立つ, Shimaki Tatsu); 43. "Stars in the Jar of the Sky" (壷天の星, Ko Ten no Hoshi); 44. "Aquamarine" (水碧む, Mizu Aomu); 45. "The Bed of Grass" (草の茵, Kusa no Shitone)
10	November 21, 2008	978-4-06-314537-3	July 27, 2010	978-0-345-50560-6
46. "The Thread of Light" (光の緒, Hikari no O); 47. "The Eternal Tree" (常の樹, Tokoshie no Ki); 48. "The Scented Darkness" (香る闇, Kaoru Yami); 49. "Drops of Bells (Part 1)" (鈴の雫 (前編), Suzu no Shizuku (Zenpen)); 50. "Drops of Bells (Part 2)" (鈴の雫 (後編), Suzu no Shizuku (Kōhen))

=== Anime ===
The Mushishi anime adaptation was animated by Artland, directed by Hiroshi Nagahama, and produced by a group called "Mushishi Production Committee", which consists of Marvelous Entertainment, Avex Entertainment and SKY Perfect Well Think. The first 20 episodes of the series originally aired between October 23, 2005, and March 12, 2006, on Fuji Television. A digest was broadcast on May 7, 2006, by BS Fuji, which aired the last six episodes from May 14 to June 18 of the same year. Marvelous Entertainment and Avex released the series from January 25 to September 27, 2006, in five DVDs for sale, and at the same time in nine DVDs for rental. On March 28, 2008, a DVD box set containing all episodes was released; it was followed by a Blu-ray box set on March 27, 2009, and a Limited Edition Blu-ray box on December 20, 2013.

The anime series' licensing was announced by Funimation to North American release in January 2007. To promote the series' release, it hosted Nagahama at the Anime Expo 2007 between June 29 and July 2. In addition, Funimation exhibited the first four episodes in New York and Texas' locations such as ImaginAsian Theater, Studio Movie Grill, and Alamo Drafthouse, on July 23 and 24 of that year. The series was released in six DVDs between July 31, 2007, to February 26, 2008, by Funimation, which also streamed series on its own channel, Hulu, Joost, Anime News Network, Crackle, as well as distributed it to Comcast cable service. Funimation also released four box sets with all episodes: on December 16, 2008, on October 6, 2009, on July 6, 2010, and November 8, 2011. In United Kingdom, the series was released between October 22, 2007, and November 17, 2008, by Revelation Films in six DVD. Madman Entertainment acquired the series' distribution rights at AVCon in 2007, releasing it in a six-discs box set on January 14, 2009, in PAL region.

Based on the 2013 two-chapter side story, a special titled Mushishi Tokubetsu-hen: Hihamukage (蟲師 特別篇「日蝕む翳」; lit. 'The Shadow That Devours the Sun') was broadcast on Tokyo MX, Tochigi TV, Gunma TV, and BS11 on January 4, 2014, and streamed by Niconico. Aniplex released the special on DVD and Blu-ray on April 23, 2014. A second anime television season titled Mushishi: Zoku-Shō (蟲師 続章) started airing on April 5, 2014, on Tokyo MX and other channels. As with the special, the second season featured the same director, the same studio and main cast from the first season. After the broadcast of the tenth episode on June 21, the "first half" was finished. Another special, Mushishi: Path of Thorns (蟲師 特別篇 棘のみち, Mushishi Tokubetsu-hen: Odoro no Michi), aired on August 20 on BS11. The latter half of the second season started to air on October 19, (Note: As stated on the official website, Mushi-Shi -Next Passage-'s "second half" officially premiered on October 18, 2014 at 24:30 (October 19, 00:30).) and ended on December 21, 2014. Zoku-Shō first DVD compilation was released on July 23, 2014, in Japan, and the sixth—and last–was released on July 22, 2015. A sequel anime film titled Mushishi: Bell Droplets (蟲師 続章 鈴の雫, Mushishi Zoku-Shō: Suzu no Shizuku), based on the manga's last arc, was announced in December 2014 and released on May 16, 2015, in Japan.

Hihamukage was streamed by Crunchyroll for premium members on January 4, 2014, and made available for free user a week later. In March, the second season was licensed by Aniplex of America as Mushi-Shi -Next Passage-. In November, Madman Entertainment acquired its home media release rights for Australia. Late in the same month, Madman also licensed the series for streaming and made it available on its site AnimeLab. Madman released a DVD box set containing all Next Passage's episodes, Path of Thorns and Bell Droplets on December 7, 2016.

In January 2026, Kodansha began streaming the first series on its "Anime Manga Official" YouTube channel, offering the series in both Japanese dub with English subtitles and English dub.

=== Other media ===
Several books based on Mushishi have been released. A guidebook titled Mushishi Official Book was released by Kodansha on January 23, 2006. An artbook and a book with staff commentaries on the anime series production were released on June 30 and July 20, 2007, respectively. Two Anime Hōsōjun Selection (アニメ放送順セレクション) books were released on April 23, and May 14, 2014; a Utage-hen (宴編; lit. 'Feast Edition') and a Odoro-hen (棘編; lit. 'Thorn Edition') respectively. On June 19, 2015, a "large format" art book was released by Kodansha.

The music for both Mushishi anime adaptations were composed by Toshio Masuda. Two soundtrack albums were released by Marvelous Entertainment and Geneon Entertainment for the first anime adaptation; the first on March 24, 2006, and the second on July 23, 2006. On June 25, 2015, the soundtrack for Next Passage was released by Aniplex.

A live-action Mushishi feature film, released at the 2006 Venice International Film Festival, was directed by Katsuhiro Otomo and starred Joe Odagiri as Ginko. Also known as Bugmaster and Mushi-Shi: The Movie in English, it was released in Japanese theaters on March 24, 2007.

Mushishi was also adapted into a video game; the Nintendo DS game titled Mushishi: Amefuru Sato (蟲師 〜天降る里〜) was developed by Tenky and published by Marvelous Entertainment in Japan on January 31, 2008.

From March 18 to 29, 2015, a "stage reading" event, which adapted six chapters from the manga into six separate performances, was held in Tokyo. It was directed by Mushishi anime director Hiroshi Nagahama and its original script was written by Kazuaki Nakamura, while the anime voice actors acted as their respective characters. The production used augmented reality on its visuals, which was designed to span a 270 degree field of view.

== Reception ==
=== Awards and public response ===
The series has won numerous awards: in 2003, the manga was awarded an Excellence Prize for manga at the 7th Japan Media Arts Festival, while in 2006, the series won the Kodansha Manga Award for general manga. At the 10th Japan Media Arts Festival, both the anime and manga series were placed among the top 10 in their respective categories for best manga and anime. The anime series won grand prizes in the categories of television series and best art direction (for Takashi Waki) at the 5th Tokyo Anime Award competition held at the Tokyo International Anime Fair in 2006, while Nagahama won the Animation Kobe Individual Award for his directing. It also ranked 13th in a "Top 20" poll conducted by Japanese anime magazine Animage in 2006. In the following year, Mushishi was placed in 9th on Japan's Agency for Cultural Affairs's list of best manga, as well as ranked in 6th place on its list of best anime. Young Adult Library Services Association also listed the manga among 33 titles with "good quality literature and appealing reading for teens" in 2008.

Mushishi was also well received by Japanese-language readers. The ten volumes have sold over 3.8 million copies. Individual volumes frequently appeared on the weekly lists of best-selling manga there. Furthermore, the eighth volume was the 9th best-selling manga of Amazon.com in the first half of 2007. A similar feat was achieved by the last volume which was ranked 49th in the Oricon list of best-selling manga of the first half of 2009. In North America, ICv2 has listed the manga among the "Top 300 Graphic Novels" of the month twice. Readers of About.com voted it the best seinen manga released in North America in 2007. The sixth volume of Mushishi was also among the best-selling manga in Malaysia in the week of March 1, 2009.

=== Critical reception ===
Mushishi was chosen as the best manga of 2007 by Deb Aoki of About.com, elected the best anime series of 2007 by Anime News Network's Carl Kimlinger, and was ranked seventh by Ramsey Isler in IGN's list of the Top Anime of 2007. Aoki called it "a rare breed of manga: a smartly-written, original story that's told with simple yet mesmerizing imagery." Similarly, Kimlinger declared that "Its hypnotic rhythm, humanism, and naturalist's eye for beauty give it a charm that far outstrips mere entertainment value." Reviewer Jason Thompson intoned that while it may be "too mellow" for certain readers, he found praiseworthy its "very original vision, with a sort of 'flowing life' of its own, a biologist's precision mixed with creepy fairytales and a surreal, dreamy feel." Its storytelling was highly praised; Isler deemed it as "near flawless", while Pop Culture Shock's Ken Haley labeled it "an enjoyable and intriguing read", and Shirl Sazynski of Sequential Tart lauded its "short, spooky and breathtaking stories." Manga Life's Joy Kim stated that its lack of a central story allows one to enter at any volume, and that "the quality of the storytelling" will make fans want to read it in entirety. The "quiet and subtle stories that evoke strong emotions with great story crafting and a fine tune to the essence of what moves people" is the main appeal of the series, according to Holly Ellingwood of Active Anime. Both Ed Sizemore and Avi Weinryb, writing for Comics Worth Reading and Comic Book Bin respectively, said Mushishi has something to tell to readers, with the former commenting "If you want a manga to make you stop and think, this is the manga for you."

Mushi-Shi -Next Passage- was also well received by fans; almost all of its DVD and Blu-ray volumes made the Top 20 list of the Oricon best-selling charts. (Note: First volume placed 18th and 19th on DVD and Blu-Ray respectively; second volume placed 24th (DVD) and 19th (Blu-Ray); the third volume placed 18th (DVD) and 11th (Blu-Ray); the fourth volume placed 14th (DVD and Blu-Ray); the fifth volume placed 21st (DVD) and 16th (Blu-Ray); and the sixth volume placed 25th (DVD) and 20th (Blu-Ray).) Jacob Hope Chapman of Anime News Network praised the maintenance of the visual quality and the improvement upon the quality of the stories, declaring that "Mushi-Shi is quickly evolving from an excellent series of fables about the natural world to a wholly unique masterpiece that a written review can't really do justice by." Chapman dubbed it "one of the all-time greatest animated anthology series." The Fandom Post's Kory Cerjak stated the series "is perhaps one of the most innovative shows out there in terms of storytelling." Ben Huber of Japanator praised its "soothing music and beautiful art", noting that "most anime struggle to create relatable and compelling characters in 12 or 24 episodes. Mushishi does it every week in one goddamn episode... and it does it with grace." Richard Eisenbeis of Kotaku said while it is worth watching simply for the quality of its imagery, it "is a series that is equal parts beautiful and haunting — often bringing more emotion in a 22-minute episode than most series can bring in their entire runs."

== See also ==
- Shadow biosphere
