= Aya Nakano =

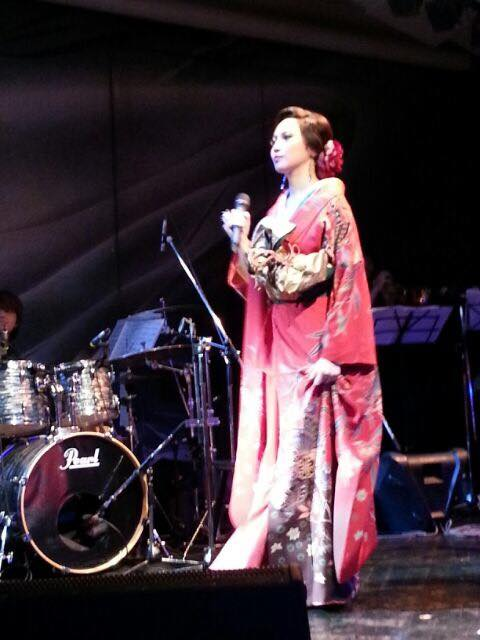

Background information
- Born: May 7, 1985 (age 41)
- Origin: Kyoto, Japan
- Occupations: Singer, songwriter
- Years active: 2010–present
- Labels: Vivid Sound & High Contrast; Universal Music Japan
- Website: www.nakanoaya.com

Aya Nakano (なかの 綾, Nakano Aya; born May 7, 1985) is a Japanese singer and songwriter from Kyoto. She is the daughter of a traditional Japanese weaver in Nishijin, Kyoto. At age 10 she joined the Kyoto City Junior Children’s Choir, where she studied the foundations of music and collaborated with conductor Yutaka Sado as well as the Vienna Boys' Choir.

== Career ==
At 18, she began singing exclusively at “Respos”, a Jazz Club in Kyoto, broadening her repertoire from Jazz and 'oldies' to Showa-Kayou (Japanese folk music). Nakano debuted in 2010 with the album Zurui Hito.

In 2011, she co-starred with Katsuya Kobayashi and Masatou Ibu in R60 Snake Man Show, put together by Moichi Kuwahara. The show aired on the cable TV channel WOWOW. In 2012, the limited edition of Nakano’s debut, Zurui Hito was released as an album. In April, she made a guest appearance on the timbales player Willy Nagasaki’s album Midnight Rumba; the song on which she featured, “Wakare no Mambo”, reached number 1 in the USEN Weekly Indie Chart.

Nakano appeared on NHK's Kayou Concert in June 2013, followed by the release of the album Hetana Uso - her first on Universal Sigma. Nakano became the cover girl of Jazz Japan magazine in 2014 New Year’s edition. She released a 7-inch single, "Chotto Matte Kudasai".

== Discography ==
=== Albums ===
- Last Metro ラストメトロ (2010)
- Zurui Hito ずるいひと (2012)
- Hoteru ホテル (2013)
- Heta na Uso へたなうそ (2013)
- Chotto Matte Kudasai ちょっと待って下さい (2014)
