= Yuki Urushibara =

Japanese manga artist

- Born: January 23, 1974 (age 52) Yamaguchi, Japan
- Area: Manga artist
- Notable works: Mushishi
- Awards: Kodansha Manga Award (2006)

Yuki Urushibara (Japanese: 漆原 友紀, Hepburn: Urushibara Yuki; born 23 January 1974) is a Japanese manga artist. She is best known for the series Mushishi, for which she received an Excellence Prize for manga at the 2003 Japan Media Arts Festival and the 2006 Kodansha Manga Award for general manga. She is also known by the pen name Soyogo Shima (志摩 冬青, Shima Soyogo).

== Works ==
- Bio Luminescence (1997) – A compilation of short works. Later included in Filament.
- Mushishi (1999–2008, Kodansha, 10 volumes) – Published in Afternoon Season Zōkan and Monthly Afternoon. Adapted into an anime television series.
- Filament (2004) – A compilation of short works, which includes the stories in Bio Luminescence and two other stories.
- Suiiki (2009–2010, Kodansha, 2 volumes) – Published in Monthly Afternoon.
- Mushishi Special: Sun-Eating Shade (2013) – Two-chapter special published in Monthly Afternoon.
- When a Cat Faces West (2018–2020, Kodansha, 3 volumes) – Published in Monthly Afternoon.
- Nella of the Horizon (2025–present, Kodansha) – Published in Monthly Afternoon.
