= Fifth Colvmn Records discography =

Fifth Colvmn Records
- Founded: 1990
- Founder: Zalman Fishman
- Defunct: 1997
- Genre: Electro-industrial; Industrial rock
- Country of origin: United States
- Location: Washington, D.C.

Fifth Colvmn Records was founded in 1990 by Zalman Fishman, with vocalist Jared Louche employed as general manager, and was recognized for its industrial music roster. The label made its debut with an EP, titled 10 Ton Pressure, by the industrial rock group Chemlab and in 1993 released the band's critically acclaimed studio album Burn Out at the Hydrogen Bar. The label dissolved in 1997 and made its final release the various artists compilation World War Underground.

== Key ==
No.	The release's unique catalog number. These are formatted as 9868-00000.
CD	Compact disc
CS	CS
LP	Long play
VHS	Video Home System

== List of releases ==
=== Main Discography ===
Fifth Colvmn Records Catalogue
No.	Year	Artist	Title	Format
63181	1994	Acumen	Transmissions From Eville	CD
63182	1994	haloblack	Tension Filter	CD
63183	1994	Perceptual Outer Dimensions	The Journey to Planet POD	CD
63237	1994	Circus of Pain	The Swamp Meat Intoxication	CD
63182	1995	haloblack	raw tension e.p.	CS
63184	1995	Max M	Max M Corporation	CD
63185	1995	Oxygiene 23	Blue	CD
63186	1995	Various artists	The Best of Mind/Body: Electro-Industrial Music From the Internet	CD
63189	1995	To Live and Shave in L.A.	Vedder Vedder Bedwetter	CD
63190	1995	Luc van Acker	Taking Snapshots Vol. 1	CD
63191	1995	Insight 23	Obsess	CD
63192	1995	Sun God	Sun God	CD
63193	1995	Black Rain	1.0	CD
63194	1995	Black Lung	The Depopulation Bomb	CD
63195	1995	Sphere Lazza	Incinerate	CD
63196	1995	Ipecac Loop	eX	CD
63197	1995	Various artists	Forced Cranial Removal	CD
63198	1995	Cyber-Tec Project	Cyber-Tec	CD
63199	1995	Dessau	Details Sketchy	CD
63202	1995	New Mind	Zero to the Bone	CD
63203	1995	Electro Assassin	The Divine Invasion	CD
63205	1995	Crisis n.T.i.	The Alien Conspiracy	CD
63207	1995	Perceptual Outer Dimensions	Euphonia	CD
63208	1996	T.H.C.	Death by Design	CD
63210	1996	H3llb3nt	0.01	CD
63211	1996	C_{17}H_{19}NO_{3}	Terra Damnata	CD
63214	1996	ZIA	SHEM	CD
63215	1996	Acumen	Territory = Universe	CD
63216	1996	James Ray and The Performance/James Rays Gangwar	Best of James Ray's Performance & Gangwar	CD
63217	1996	Various artists	Melt - Scandinavian Electro/Industrial Compilation	CD
63218	1996	Ether Bunny	Papa Woody	CD
63219	1996	Peach of Immortality	Talking Heads '77	CD
63220	1996	Various artists	Document 01 - Trance/Tribal	CD
63221	1996	Death Ride 69	Screaming Down the Gravity Well	CD
63222	1996	Various artists	Dissolve a Work in Progress Compilation	CD
63223	1996	Final Cut	Atonement	CD
63224	1996	Vampire Rodents	Gravity's Rim	CD
63225	1996	Shinjuku Filth	Junk	CD
63226	1996	Dive	Reported	CD
63227	1996	D!v!s!on #9	The True Creator	CD
63229	1996	Various artists	Colloquium ¹	CD
63231	1996	Trust Obey	Hands of Ash	CD
63232	1996	Signal Aout 42	Immortal Collection 1983-1995	CD
63233	1996	Various artists	Echo	CD
63234	1996	Gravy	After That It's All Gravy	CD
63235	1996	To Live and Shave in L.A.	"Helen Butte" vs. Masonna Pussy Badsmell	CD
63236	1996	Meathead and Cop Shoot Cop	Dick Smoker Plus	CD
63238	1996	Various artists	We're All Frankies	CD
63239	1996	Various artists	Fascist Communist Revolutionaries	CD
63240	1996	Various artists	Sweet Sub/Mission Vol. 1	CD
63241	1996	Black Rain	Nanarchy	CD
63242	1996	haloblack	funkyhell	CD
63244	1996	Shattering Sirens	Phonocatheter	CD
63245	1996	T.H.C.	Consenting Guinea Pig	CD
63249	1997	Shining	Din	CD
63251	1997	proGREX.iv	reINVENTION opERATION	CD
63255	1997	Various artists	World War Underground	CD

=== Side Discographys ===
3984 releases
No.	Year	Artist	Title	Format
14013	1993	Chemlab	Burn Out at the Hydrogen Bar	CD, CS
14028	1994	Chemlab	Magnetic Field Remixes + 10 Ton Pressure	CD
14115	1996	Chemlab	East Side Militia	LP

FCR releases
No.	Year	Artist	Title	Format
001	1990	Chemlab	10 Ton Pressure	CD, CS
002	1992	Thud	Life & Death	LP
004	1993	Chemlab	Burn Out at the Hydrogen Bar	CS

Other releases
No.	Year	Artist	Title	Format
U-35656M	1993	Thud	Inevitable	LP
	1993	Chemlab	Suicide Jag	Minimax
	1993	Chemlab	Codeine, Glue & You	VHS
	1994	Various artists	Frenzied Computer Resonance	CS
	1996	Chemlab	Electric Molecular	CD
