= Incinerate (disambiguation) =

Incineration is a waste treatment process.

Incinerate may also refer to:

- Incinerate (Sphere Lazza album), 1995
- +incinerate, a 1994 EP by Sphere Lazza
- Incinerate, a 2007 album by Dew-Scented
- "Incinerate", a 2006 song by Sonic Youth from Rather Ripped
- Incinerator Studios, an American video game developer (2005–2017)

== See also ==
- Combustion
- Cremation
