= Circus of Pain =

Italian supergroup

- Origin: Bern, Switzerland
- Genres: Electro-industrial; industrial rock
- Years active: 1994–1996
- Label: Sub/Mission
- Past members: Michael Antener; G.No; Ane Hebeisen

Circus of Pain was the music project founded by Michael Antener, G.No, and Ane Hebeisen of the bands Meathead and Swamp Terrorists. In 1994 Sub/Mission Records released their debut remix EP, titled The Swamp Meat Intoxication.

== History ==
Circus of Pain was founded in 1994 by Michael Antener, G.No, and Ane Hebeisen. The band released their debut EP, titled The Swamp Meat Intoxication, in 1994. It was made with the collaborative efforts of the bands Pankow and Templebeat and was commended for its "ugly vocals, heavy guitars, big break-beats and perverse lyrics". In 1996 the band's debut was reissued by Fifth Colvmn Records and the Paolo Favati remix of "Remove My Skin" was released on the various artist compilations Sweet Sub/Mission Vol. 1 and The Digital Space Between Vol. 3. Circus of Pain recorded the song "Rotula" and in 1996 released it to The Answering Machine Solution on Staalplaat.

== Discography ==
Extended plays

- The Swamp Meat Intoxication (1994, Sub/Mission)
