= Now I'm Just a Number: Soundtracks 1994–95 =

Compilation album by Black Rain
- Released: February 20, 2012
- Recorded: October 13, 2012
- Studio: Various: Corsica Studios; (London, United Kingdom); Shimokawa Studio; (New York City)
- Genre: Industrial
- Length: 37:34
- Label: Blackest Ever Black
- Producer: Stuart Argabright; Shinichi Shimokawa

Black Rain chronology
Nanarchy (1996)	Now I'm Just a Number: Soundtracks 1994–95 (2012)	Protoplasm (2013)

Now I'm Just a Number: Soundtracks 1994–95 is a compilation album by Black Rain, released on February 20, 2012 by Blackest Ever Black.

== Reception ==
The Quietus called the songs of Now I'm Just a Number: Soundtracks 1994–95 "well ahead of their curve" and described the titletrack as "the album's centrepiece - a throbbing floorgazer that’s all smouldering smoke, steam, and steel, flickering with twitchy hi-hats and techy, asynchronous rhythmic palpitations."

== Track listing ==
All tracks are written by Stuart Argabright.

Side one
No.	Title	Length
1.	"Lo Tek"	1:27
2.	"Night City Tokyo"	7:17
3.	"Lo Tek Bridge"	2:57
4.	"Biotechno 1 and 2"	6:10

Side two
No.	Title	Length
5.	"Lo Tek Bridge 2"	3:19
6.	"Now I'm Just a Number"	11:31
7.	"Lo Tek Musicm"	4:53

== Personnel ==
Adapted from the Now I'm Just a Number: Soundtracks 1994-95 liner notes.

Black Rain

- Stuart Argabright – instruments, production, recording, mixing
- Shinichi Shimokawa – instruments, production, mixing

Production and design

- Joseph Bartoldus – mixing
- Matt Colton – remastering, mastering
- Paul Geluso – recording
- Hiroko Kawasaki – photography
- Oliver Smith – design

== Release history ==
Region	Date	Label	Format	Catalog
United Kingdom	2012	Blackest Ever Black	CS, DL, LP	BLACKEST007
