= Echo (compilation album) =

Compilation album by Various artists
- Released: 1996
- Genre: Electronic
- Length: 71:41
- Label: Full Contact.
- Producer: John Bergin

Fifth Colvmn Records chronology
Colloquium ¹ (1995)	Echo (1996)	Fascist Communist Revolutionaries (1996)

Echo is a various artists compilation album released in 1996 by Full Contact Records.

== Reception ==
Aiding & Abetting gave Echo a positive review and said "the range of possibilities in electronic music is pretty wide, and this set shows that quite well." Lollipop Magazine said "Intent on being an overview of Fifth Colvmn’s sister label Full Contact, Echo does its best to showcase the best music they’ve got" and "if you ever wanted a reasonably full understanding of what the "alternative" label means to Electro bands, Echo comes pretty damn close." Sonic Boom said "There isn't a single letdown track on the whole record with stellar performances turned in by Ipecac Loop, C_{17}H_{19}NO_{3}, Shinjuku Filth & Zia" and "almost all of the tracks on this compilation are exclusive and appear nowhere else which makes this a must have for serious completists."

== Track listing ==
No.	Title	Writer(s)	Artist	Length
1.	"Blossom"	Holmes Ives; John Ives; Steve Watson	Three Tragic Myths	4:46
2.	"Eden (Wendy's Song)"	Ives; Michael Meacham	Meacham & P.O.D.	10:13
3.	"Dub Altar"	Mick Hale	D!v!s!on #9	8:11
4.	"Surya"	Ives	Perceptual Outer Dimensions	5:50
5.	"Space-Time"	Rob Trainor; Elaine Walker	ZIA	4:38
6.	"Hypnotize"	Ives	Apraxia	4:29
7.	"Afraid of the Aesthetic"	Darrin Verhagen	Shinjuku Filth	3:44
8.	"The Fall"	Jonathan Sharp	LAShTAL	5:35
9.	"Passion Vessel"	John Bergin	C_{17}H_{19}NO_{3}	5:27
10.	"Out from Under"	Cameron Lewis	Ipecac Loop	3:28
11.	"Pole"	Ron Anteroinen; Alberto Gaitan	Self Organizing System	5:02
12.	"Night City.Ambient"	Stuart Argabright; Shinichi Shimokawa	Black Rain	4:53
13.	"Pink"	Jared Louche; Dylan Thomas More	Chemlab	5:24

== Personnel ==
Adapted from the Echo liner notes.

- John Bergin – producer, cover art, illustrations, design, art direction

== Release history ==
Region	Date	Label	Format	Catalog
United States	1996	Full Contact	CD	9868-63233
