= Best of James Ray's Performance & Gangwar =

Compilation album by James Ray and The Performance/James Rays Gangwar
- Released: March 5, 1996
- Recorded: 1986 –
- Genre: Gothic rock
- Length: 72:40
- Label: Fifth Colvmn
- Producers: Andrew Eldritch; Hugh Jones

James Ray chronology
Third Generation (1993)	Best of James Ray's Performance & Gangwar (1996)	Psychodalek (1997)

Best of James Ray's Performance & Gangwar is a compilation album by James Ray and The Performance and James Rays Gangwar, released on March 5, 1996, by Fifth Colvmn Records.

== Reception ==
Professional ratings
Review scores
Source	Rating
AllMusic	4/5 stars

AllMusic awarded Best of James Ray's Performance & Gangwar four out of five stars. Aiding & Abetting recommended the anthology to listeners of The Sisters of Mercy and said "Ray avoids some of the dreary excesses that later Sisters stuff got bogged down in, and simply cranks out quite a few moody yet catchy tunes." A critic at babysue commended the album and said "sounds nice, and is a bit poppier than you might think."

== Track listing ==
All tracks are written by Travis Earl, James Ray, John Ridge and Damon Vingoe, except "Coo Ca Choo" by Peter Shelley.

No.	Title	Album (date)	Length
1.	"Mexico Sundown Blues"	A New Kind of Assassin (1989)	9:05
2.	"Texas"	A New Kind of Assassin (1989)	5:31
3.	"Mountain Voices" (Remix)	A New Kind of Assassin (1989)	5:03
4.	"Dust Boat"	A New Kind of Assassin (1989)	4:30
5.	"Edie Sedgwick"	A New Kind of Assassin (1989)	6:20
6.	"Rev Rev Lowrider"	A New Kind of Assassin (1989)	8:19
7.	"Heart Surgery"	Dios Está De Nuestro Lado (1992)	4:57
8.	"35 Thousand Times"	Dios Está De Nuestro Lado (1992)	4:31
9.	"Badlands"	Dios Está De Nuestro Lado (1992)	2:54
10.	"Hardwar"	Dios Está De Nuestro Lado (1992)	4:58
11.	"Cadillac Coming"	Dios Está De Nuestro Lado (1992)	4:38
12.	"Bad Gin"	Dios Está De Nuestro Lado (1992)	3:42
13.	"Santa Susana"	Dios Está De Nuestro Lado (1992)	4:21
14.	"Coo Ca Choo" (Alvin Stardust cover)	Dios Está De Nuestro Lado (1992)	3:51

== Personnel ==
Adapted from the Best of James Ray's Performance & Gangwar liner notes.

James Ray's Performance & Gangwar

- Travis Earl – guitar
- James Ray – vocals, mixing (6–13)
- John Ridge – guitar
- Damon Vingoe – bass guitar

Production and design

- Andrew Eldritch – producer (1–5)
- Zalman Fishman – executive-production
- Hugh Jones – producer (1–5)
- Roy Neave – producer and mixing (6–13)

== Release history ==
Region	Date	Label	Format	Catalog
United States	1996	Fifth Colvmn	CD	9868-63216
