= Document 01 - Trance/Tribal =

Compilation album by Various artists
- Released: 1994
- Genres: Ambient; industrial
- Length: 64:04
- Label: Dorobo

Fifth Colvmn Records chronology
Melt - Scandinavian Electro/Industrial Compilation (1994)	Document 01 - Trance/Tribal (1994)	The Best of Mind/Body (1995)

Document 01 - Trance/Tribal is a various artists compilation album released in 1994 by Dorobo. The album was reissued on April 23, 1996, by Full Contact Records.

== Reception ==
Professional ratings
Review scores
Source	Rating
AllMusic	3/5 stars

Aiding & Abetting called Document 01 - Trance/Tribal "worth the effort" and "a good set of musicians who try to expand the realm of the subconscious, without offending the intelligence of the conscious. AllMusic awarded The Best of Mind/Body three out of five stars and said "of special interest is the album's finale, "The Heartbeat Fades," a rare solo piece from Paul Schütze of Can fame." Sonic Boom said "shows that classical trained musicians with the proper equipment can compose extraordinarily complex arrays of electronic music that would be at home not only on a dance floor but also as easy listening music for experimental enthusiasts."

== Track listing ==
No.	Title	Writer(s)	Artist	Length
1.	"Ranidella Signifera"	Murray Littlejohn	Melbourne University Dept. of Zoology	0:57
2.	"Red Garden"	Gordon Harvey; Tom MacGregor	Hanging Garden	7:13
3.	"Beyond"	Charles Tétaz	Synapse Interrupt	4:53
4.	"The Killing Jar"	Garry Havrillay	Garry Havrillay	3:59
5.	"Afraid of the Aesthetic"	François Tétaz	Shinjuku Filth	3:42
6.	"Suntoy"	Uzect Plaush; Adam Routh	Suntoy	9:04
7.	"Wrap Around Eyes"	Darrel Merritt	The DNA Lounge	1:10
8.	"Between The Apo Kayan and the Infinite"	Steve Law	Zen Paradox	5:33
9.	"(A View) From Babel Over Babylon"	Peter Breuer	Tch	4:50
10.	"Nightsoil"	David Thrussell; Pieter Bourke	Soma	5:11
11.	"Strategic Womb"	François Tétaz; Melbourne University Dept. of Zoology	Loggerhead	11:52
12.	"The Heart That Fades"	Paul Schütze	Paul Schütze	5:41

== Personnel ==
Adapted from the Document 01 - Trance/Tribal liner notes.

- Richard Grant (I+T=R) – design

== Release history ==
Region	Date	Label	Format	Catalog
Australia	1994	Dorobo	CD	DOROBO 001
United States	1996	Full Contact	CD	9868–63220
