= Graven image =

Graven image or graven images may refer to:

- Cult image, a human-made object that is venerated or worshipped for the deity, spirit, or daemon that it embodies or represents
- Thou shalt not make unto thee any graven image, one of the Ten Commandments

== Literature ==
- Graven Image, a 1923 novel by Margaret Widdemer
- Graven Images, a 1966 book by Allan Ludwig
- "Graven Image", a short story by E. Hoffmann Price in the 1967 short story collection Strange Gateways
- Graven Images (book), a 1982 short story collection by Paul Fleischman
- Graven Images: Religion in Comic Books and Graphic Novels, a 2010 essay collection by A. David Lewis and Christine Hoff Kraemer
- Graven Image, a 2011 novella by Charlie Williams
- Graven Images, a 2011 novel by Ray Norris
- The Graven Image, a 2003 book by Zainab Bahrani

== Music ==
- Graven Image (album), a 1994 album by Jandek
- "Graven Image", a 1983 song by Deep Wound
- "Graven Image", a song by Shinjuku Thief from the 1991 album Bloody Tourist
- "Graven Image", a song by Bolt Thrower from the 1994 album ...For Victory
- "Graven Image", a song by Dead to Fall from the 2002 album Everything I Touch Falls to Pieces
- "Gravenimage", a song by Sonata Arctica from the 2003 album Winterheart's Guild
