= Cameron Lewis =

Cameron Lewis may refer to:

- Cam Lewis (born 1997), American football cornerback
- Cameron Lewis (General Hospital), a fictional character on American soap opera General Hospital
- Cameron Lewis (musician), composer
- Alexander Cameron Lewis, Canadian politician
