= Cyberchrist (EP) =

EP by Sphere Lazza
- Released: 1993
- Genre: EBM; industrial
- Label: Reactor

Sphere Lazza chronology
Fatal Ignorance (1993)	Cyberchrist (1993)	+incinerate (1994)

Cyberchrist is the second EP by Sphere Lazza, released in 1993 by Reactor Records.

== Music ==
The song "Justified?" from Cyberchrist was released on Blood and Computers II: The Return of the Cyberpunks by Paradise Movement and later on the band third EP +incinerate and Electro Industrial Assassins by Cleopatra Records in 1995. The album was remastered and packaged with the band's next release, titled +incinerate, for the band's 1995 compilation album Incinerate on Fifth Colvmn Records.

== Reception ==
Sonic Boom called Cyberchrist "habitually addictive dance industrial" and said "very original work here, a bit of the deep background percussion is mildly reminiscent to older Front by Front area Front 242, but the comparison ends there."

== Track listing ==
All tracks are written by Tony Spaz and David Trousdale.

Side one
No.	Title	Length
1.	"Under Pressure"	4:26
2.	"Victim of the Flesh"	5:03
3.	"Cyberchrist"	3:07
4.	"Damned Nations"	2:10

Side two
No.	Title	Length
1.	"Justified?"	3:19
2.	"Diminish"
3.	"Mortal Wounds"	5:05

== Personnel ==
Adapted from the Cyberchrist liner notes.

Sphere Lazza

- Tony Spaz – instruments
- David Trousdale – vocals, instruments

== Release history ==
Region	Date	Label	Format	Catalog
United States	1993	Reactor	CS	001
