= Black Rain =

Black Rain may refer to:

== Phenomena ==
- Black rain, rain polluted with dark particulates; such as those from wildfires, volcanic eruptions and explosions, and nuclear fallout.

== Film and television ==
- Black Rain (1977 film) or The Last Wave, an Australian film directed by Peter Weir
- Black Rain (1989 American film), a film directed by Ridley Scott
- Black Rain (1989 Japanese film), a film directed by Shohei Imamura based on Masuji Ibuse's novel (see below)
- Black rain, a fictional atmospheric phenomenon in season 4 of the TV series The 100

== Music ==
- Black Rain (band), an American electro-industrial group
  - Black Rain (EP), by Black Rain, 1992
  - Black Rain (Live EP), by Black Rain 1993
- Black Rain (Dark Lotus album), 2004
- Black Rain (Ozzy Osbourne album), 2007, or the title song
- "Black Rain" (Creeper song), 2017
- "Black Rain" (Soundgarden song), 2010
- "Black Rain", a song by Blink-182 from Nine, 2019
- "Black Rain", a song by Keane from Strangeland, 2012

== Other uses ==
- Black Rain (novel), a 1965 novel by Masuji Ibuse
- Blackra1n, an application for jailbreaking iPods and iPhones
- Operation Black Rain, a 2008 operation by the U.S. Bureau of Alcohol, Tobacco, Firearms and Explosives

== See also ==
- Black rainstorm signal, the third level of Hong Kong rainstorm warning signals
- Schwarzer Regen (lit. Black Rain), a fictional exoskeleton in the Japanese light novel series Infinite Stratos
- Black Reign (disambiguation)
- Dark Rain, The Outer Limits (1995 TV series) episode
