= The Swamp Meat Intoxication =

EP by Circus of Pain
- Released: 1994
- Studio: Blue Velvet (Florence, Italy)
- Genre: Electro-industrial; industrial rock
- Length: 37:58
- Label: Sub/Mission

Swamp Terrorists chronology
The Get O. EP (1994)	The Swamp Meat Intoxication (1994)	Dive-Right Jab: The Remixes (1995)

Alternative cover
- Fifth Colvmn Records reissue cover

The Swamp Meat Intoxication is the debut EP by Circus of Pain, released in 1994 by Sub/Mission Records. The band comprises members of Meathead and Swamp Terrorists and involved the musical contributions of Pankow and Templebeat. On September 24, 1996 the album was reissued by Fifth Colvmn Records.

== Reception ==
Professional ratings
Review scores
Source	Rating
AllMusic	2.5/5 stars

Aiding & Abetting preferred the originals to the remixes of The Swamp Meat Intoxication, saying "the remixes are nothing spectacular, really" and "just average German engineering-type stuff with a few bells and whistles. AllMusic awarded the album two and a half out of five stars and said "composed of members from Swamp Terrorists and Meathead, Circus of Pain play industrial-metal with S&M themes." Culture Shock Transmission described it as "a fresh, stylish, and damn funky release." Music From the Empty Quarter recommended the release to admirers of both bands. Sonic Boom called the release "something that any Swamp Terrorist junky would want to pick up for the sheer novelty value alone" and "while only an EP, and four of the eight songs merely being remixes of the same track, this release should not be taken lightly."

== Track listing ==
All tracks are written by Michael Antener, G.No, and Ane Hebeisen, except "Dick Smoker" by Mauro Teho Teardo and "Right Here" by Michael Antener and Ane Hebeisen.

No.	Title	Remixer(s)	Length
1.	"Remove My Skin" (Butt Mix)	Circus of Pain; Paolo Favati	4:19
2.	"Dick Smoker" (Swamp Remix) (Meathead cover)	Mauro Teho Teardo	3:39
3.	"Remove My Skin" (FM#0051)	Maurizio Fasolo	5:07
4.	"Right Here" (Meat Remix) (Swamp Terrorists cover)	Paolo Favati	4:27
5.	"Remove My Skin" (Paolo F. Remix)	Paolo Favati	4:29
6.	"Rreemmoovvee Mmyy Sskkiinn" (FM#0050)	Maurizio Fasolo	5:59
7.	"Butt ... What?"		2:03
8.	"Diameter" (Edited by Kowp)		7:55

== Personnel ==
Adapted from the liner notes of The Swamp Meat Intoxication.

Circus of Pain

- Michael Antener (as STR) – sampler, bass guitar
- G.No – bass guitar
- Ane Hebeisen (as Ane H.) – lead vocals, bass guitar

Additional performers

- Matteo Dainese – drums
- Maurizio Fasolo – sampler, mixing, remixer (3, 6), cover art, design
- Paolo Favati – sampler, remixer (1, 4)
- Mauro Teho Teardo – guitar, bass guitar, sampler, engineering, remixer (2), cover art, design

Production and design

- Zalman Fishman – executive-production

== Release history ==
Region	Date	Label	Format	Catalog
1994	Germany	Sub/Mission	CD	cDSWHIP010
1996	United States	Fifth Colvmn	CD	9868-63237
