= The Get O. EP =

EP by Swamp Terrorists
- Released: October 24, 1994
- Studio: Combat Shock Studio (Bern, CH)
- Genre: Industrial
- Length: 130:40
- Label: Cashbeat/Sub/Mission

Swamp Terrorists chronology
The Pale Torment EP (1994)	The Get O. EP (1994)	The Swamp Meat Intoxication (1994)

The Get O. EP is an EP by Swamp Terrorists, released on October 24, 1994, by Cashbeat/Sub/Mission Records.

== Track listing ==
All tracks are written by Michael Antener and Ane Hebeisen

Disc one
No.	Title	Remixer(s)	Length
1.	"Get O." (LP Mix)		4:29
2.	"Get O." (Cut Mix)	DJ Killroy	7:20
3.	"Get O." (Wasted)	Swamp Terrorists	1:48
4.	"Get O." (Venal Plank)	Swamp Terrorists	5:25
5.	"Jerks Ever Win" (Rator Mix)	DJ Killroy	5:52
6.	"Get O." (Frisco Dump Mix)	Lassigue Bendthaus	6:10
7.	"Get O." (Profane)	Swamp Terrorists	4:49
8.	"Jerks Ever Win" (Dub)	DJ Killroy	5:17
9.	"Get O." (Virus)	Giles Keen	9:11
10.	"Get O." (Psychedelic Surrounding)	Lassigue Bendthaus	6:35

Disc two
No.	Title	Length
1.	"Killer"	0:45
2.	"Calf"	4:59
3.	"Sign"	5:16
4.	"Dumb"	6:20
5.	"Index"	5:14
6.	"Brain"	6:22
7.	"Slash"	2:27
8.	"Paralyse"	6:38
9.	"Glazed"	7:13
10.	"Lump"	2:15
11.	"Misfit"	5:25
12.	"Jeer"	5:58
13.	"Index Dub"	5:54
14.	"Kick"	4:31
15.	"Inward"	2:21
16.	"One Summer"	2:06

== Personnel ==
Adapted from the liner notes of The Get O. EP.

Swamp Terrorists

- Michael Antener (as STR) – programming
- Ane Hebeisen (as Ane H.) – lead vocals

== Release history ==
Region	Date	Label	Format	Catalog
1994	Germany/Italy	Cashbeat/Sub/Mission	CD	CB 23, WHIP007
