= Computer Soul =

EP by Black Rain
- Released: January 18, 2019
- Genre: Industrial; techno
- Length: 22:08
- Label: Blackest Ever Black
- Producer: Stuart Argabright

Black Rain chronology
Metal Rain 1989-93 (2018)	Computer Soul (2019)

Computer Soul is an EP by Black Rain, released on January 18, 2019, by Blackest Ever Black.

== Reception ==
Magnetic Magazine said Computer Soul "explores a timeless world through eerie dub-filled rides, distorted vocals, and gothic trepidation." They listed "Black Mother Kali Gandaki" at number nine of their "Best Ambient and Chill Tracks of January 2019" and said "windswept drones make for a chilly and somber track, fitting the overtone of Black Rain's album."

== Track listing ==
All tracks are written by Stuart Argabright.

Side one
No.	Title	Length
1.	"City of Atomic Ghost"	6:17
2.	"Blood Rain & Star Jelly"	4:16

Side two
No.	Title	Length
1.	"Computer Souls"	6:21
2.	"Black Mother Kali Gandaki"	5:16

== Personnel ==
Adapted from the Computer Soul liner notes.

Black Rain

- Stuart Argabright – instruments, production

Production and design

- Matt Colton – mastering

== Release history ==
Region	Date	Label	Format	Catalog
United Kingdom	2019	Blackest Ever Black	DL, LP	BLACKEST072
