= Death Ride 69 (album) =

Studio album by Death Ride 69
- Released: 1988
- Recorded: Pacific Studios (Los Angeles, CA)
- Genre: Gothic rock, industrial rock
- Length: 39:56
- Label: Little Sister Records
- Producer: Scott Arundale

Death Ride 69 chronology
Death Ride 69 (1988)	Screaming Down the Gravity Well (1996)

Death Ride 69 is the first studio album by Death Ride 69, released in 1988 by Little Sister Records.

== Track listing ==
All tracks are written by Don Diego and Linda LeSabre, except "Blue Gel Green" co-written with Wrex Mock.

Side one
No.	Title	Length
1.	"Mescalito"	5:38
2.	"Green Gel Blue"	5:06
3.	"God Tab"	3:54
4.	"Drums Along the Mohawk"	5:20

Side two
No.	Title	Length
1.	"State of Decay"	4:05
2.	"Sex Drive '68"	5:01
3.	"Elvis Christ"	4:49
4.	"Crash & Burn"	2:19
5.	"1969" (Stooges cover)	3:45

CD track listing
No.	Title	Length
1.	"Elvis Christ"	4:49
2.	"Mescalito"	5:38
3.	"State of Decay"	4:05
4.	"Sex Drive '68"	5:01
5.	"Crash & Burn"	2:19
6.	"Green Gel Blue"	5:06
7.	"God Tab"	3:54
8.	"1969" (Stooges cover)	3:45
9.	"Chain of Abuse"	5:20
10.	"State of Decay" (Alternative mix)	3:57

== Personnel ==
Adapted from the Death Ride 69 liner notes.

Death Ride 69

- Don Diego – bass guitar, vocals
- Linda LeSabre – drums, vocals
- Wrex Mock – electric guitar and vocals (A1–A4, B5)

Additional musicians

- Danny Frankel – percussion (A3)
- Dave Haas – electric guitar (B1–B4)

Production and additional personnel

- Scott Arundale – production
- Bar-Min-Ski – cover art
- John Girdler – engineering, mixing
- Merlyn Rosenberg – photography

== Release history ==
Region	Date	Label	Format	Catalog
[United States]	1988	Little Sister Records	LP	LSD 02
United States	1989	Flipside	LP	FLIP 18
United States	1989	Little Sister Records	CD	LSD 02
