= Technology Is God =

Studio album by Max M
- Released: January 1, 1992
- Genre: Electro; EBM
- Length: 58:53
- Label: Hard
- Producer: Max Møller Rasmussen

Max M chronology
Get Wild (1992)	Technology Is God (1992)	Max M Corporation (1994)

Technology Is God is the debut studio album by Max M, released on January 1, 1992, on Hard Records.

== Reception ==
Critic David Sears of Option gave Technology Is God a positive review and said "Max M deftly weaves tight and biting samples with vocals" that "handily evokes the ghost in the machine."

== Track listing ==
All tracks are written by Max Møller Rasmussen

Side one
No.	Title	Length
1.	"TechnlologyIsGod"	5:41
2.	"Forty5"	4:01
3.	"CashIsTrash"	3:40
4.	"EnviromentalExecutioner"	4:06
5.	"AintLifeAMother{...}"	7:01
6.	"Revenge"	3:06
7.	"FuckingHero"	3:46
8.	"Soap"	4:46
9.	"FleshAufMetal"	4:57
10.	"EuroTrash" (CD Mix)	5:47
11.	"GetWild" (CD Mix)	4:37
12.	"TechnologyIsGod2" (Original Mix)	3:51
13.	"TechnoUntilDeath"	3:34

== Personnel ==
Adapted from the Technology Is God liner notes.

Max M

- Max Møller Rasmussen – vocals, instruments, producer, design

Additional performers

- Captain Baxter – remixer (10)
- Carsten Lassen – guitar (1, 2, 12, 13)
- Claus Pedersen – guitar (3)
- Lasse Mosegaard (as Dr. Illington) – producer (1)

== Release history ==
Region	Date	Label	Format	Catalog
United States	1992	Hard	CD	HARDEST 03
