= Get Wild (EP) =

EP by Max M
- Released: 1992
- Genre: Electro; EBM
- Producer: Max Møller Rasmussen

Max M chronology
Get Wild (1992)	Technology Is God (1992)

Get Wild is the debut EP by Max M, self-released in 1992. The song "Ain't Life a Mother..." as later released on Max M's full-length studio album debut Technology Is God.

== Track listing ==
All tracks are written by Max Møller Rasmussen

Side one
No.	Title	Length
1.	"Get Wild" (Rave Mix)
2.	"Ain't Life a Mother..."

Side two
No.	Title	Length
1.	"Get Wild" (Ambient Mix)
2.	"Ode to Freddy" (1992 Mix)

== Personnel ==
Adapted from the Get Wild liner notes.

Max M

- Max Møller Rasmussen – vocals, instruments, producer, design

Additional performers

- Carsten Lassen – live guitar

Production and design

- Sebastian D. Tingkær – cover art, photography

== Release history ==
Region	Date	Format
Denmark	1992	LP
