= The Depopulation Bomb =

Studio album by Black Lung
- Released: 1994
- Studio: Area 51 (Melbourne, Australia)
- Genre: Dark ambient; IDM; industrial
- Length: 65:30
- Label: Iridium

Black Lung chronology
Silent Weapons for Quiet Wars (1994)	The Depopulation Bomb (1994)	The More Confusion... the More Profit (1995)

The Depopulation Bomb is the debut studio album of Black Lung, released in 1994 by Iridium Records. The album was re-released on August 15, 1995, by Fifth Colvmn Records with an additional coda titled "Horselover Fat".

== Reception ==
Sonic Boom said "this time Black Lung moves away from sound experimentation of dreams towards more of techno ambient style of instrumentation" and "don't construe that to mean that it is just another rave album, but simply that the programming has become more beat oriented with a great deal of focus on rhythms and melodies rather than soundscapes of the past.

== Track listing ==
All music is composed by David Thrussell.

No.	Title	Length
1.	"The Unreality Industry"	5:19
2.	"The Depopulation Bomb"	4:56
3.	"Eugenics"	4:16
4.	"Joyful Slaughter (of the Capitalist Swine)"	5:29
5.	"The More Confusion... The More Profit"	6:36
6.	"God Was the First Cop"	7:11
7.	"Angstlos"	5:33
8.	"Batch Consignment"	7:27
9.	"Blood Sacrifice"	5:11
10.	"The Drone of the Cattle"	4:00
11.	"Population Control"	5:36
12.	"Unreality Again"	3:58

1995 issue bonus track
No.	Title	Length
12.	"Unreality Again/Horselover Fat"	9:59

== Personnel ==
Adapted from the liner notes of The Depopulation Bomb.

Black Lung

- David Thrussell – keyboards

Production and design

- Richard Grant (I+T=R) – mastering
- Dr. Donald M. MacArthur – liner notes
- François Tétaz – design

== Release history ==
Region	Date	Label	Format	Catalog
Australia	1994	Iridium	CD	Ir 193.1
Belgium	1995	Nova Zembla	CD	NZ036
Belgium	1995	Nova Zembla	LP	08–055518–20
United States	1995	Fifth Colvmn	CD	9868–63195
