= +incinerate =

EP by Sphere Lazza
- Released: 1994
- Genre: EBM; industrial
- Length: 35:15
- Label: Arts Industria
- Producer: Tony Spaz; David Trousdale

Sphere Lazza chronology
Cyberchrist (1993)	+incinerate (1994)	Incinerate (1995)

+incinerate is the third EP by Sphere Lazza, released in 1994 by Arts Industria.

== Music ==
The song "Justified?" had previously been released on the Cyberchrist EP and on the various artists compilations Blood and Computers II: The Return of the Cyberpunks by Paradise Movement and Electro Industrial Assassins by Cleopatra Records in 1995. The song "Kiss the Serpent" was released on 1994's compilation Transatlantic Techno Trip by Electro Pulse. Four tracks from +incinerate were remastered and released with most of the band's Cyberchrist EP on the band's 1995 compilation album Incinerate, released in 1995 by Fifth Colvmn Records.

== Reception ==
Sonic Boom said +incinerate has "a unique sound quite its own" and said "stylistically this album approaches Noise Unit in programming and vocal mixing.."

== Track listing ==
All tracks are written by Tony Spaz and David Trousdale.

Side one
No.	Title	Length
1.	"Empty V"	4:15
2.	"Hiss the Serpent"	4:41
3.	"Deadlock"	3:12
4.	"Waif"	6:12

Side two
No.	Title	Length
1.	"Under Pressure" (AI Remix)	4:24
2.	"Justified?"	3:20
3.	"Mortal Wounds"	3:03
4.	"MK Ultra"	6:08

== Personnel ==
Adapted from the +incinerate liner notes.

Sphere Lazza

- Tony Spaz – instruments, production
- David Trousdale – vocals, production

Production and design

- Arts Industria – cover art, illustrations, design

== Release history ==
Region	Date	Label	Format	Catalog
United States	1994	Arts Industria	CS	AIS005
