= Phonocatheter =

Studio album by Shattering Sirens
- Released: December 3, 1996
- Genres: Electronic; experimental
- Label: Fused Coil

Phonocatheter is the debut studio album of Shattering Sirens, released on December 3, 1996, by Fused Coil. The album was distributed as a promo before Fifth Colvmn Records, the distributor for Fused Coil, went bankrupt and closed.

== Reception ==
Professional ratings
Review scores
Source	Rating
AllMusic	3/5 stars

AllMusic awarded Phonocatheter three out of five possible stars. Option described the music as "dark, dissonant, disturbing atmospherics in the vein of Bill Laswell's Sub Meta material."

== Track listing ==
All tracks are written by Tim Bradlee.

No.	Title	Length
1.	"Magnetic Resonance"
2.	"Filtered Transmission"
3.	"Pineal Discharge"
4.	"Tetanic Pulse"
5.	"Trilobitic Repetition"
6.	"Submerged in Mercury"
7.	"Timepiece for a Recluse"	3:51
8.	"Contents of a Void"	3:40
9.	"96 Cicada"	5:17
10.	"Corpus Dilecti"	4:23

== Personnel ==
Adapted from the liner notes of Phonocatheter.

Shattering Sirens

- Tim Bradlee – instruments, cover art, photography

== Release history ==
Region	Date	Label	Format	Catalog
1996	United States	Fused Coil	CD	9868-63237
