= Dark Pool =

Studio album by Black Rain
- Released: August 12, 2014
- Genre: Industrial; techno
- Length: 41:00
- Label: Blackest Ever Black
- Producer: Stuart Argabright

Black Rain chronology
Protoplasm (2013)	Dark Pool (2014)	Apophis (2015)

Dark Pool is the third studio album by Black Rain, released on August 12, 2014 by Blackest Ever Black.

== Reception ==
Professional ratings
Review scores
Source	Rating
Pitchfork Media	(7.5/10)

In their review of Dark Pool, Fact said "in an age where much dance music is set on exploring lurid, hyperreal visions of emotion and sensuality, there's something quite enervating about Black Rain's refusal of sensation: its unyielding adherence to a darkside mentality into which no warmth can leak." Pitchfork Media said the "songs at album’s center are the most visceral" and "throughout, the productions of Argabright and Shimokawa move deep into queasy dark ambient territory, yet there’s a noir-ish, cinematic sense pervading every track The Quietus also commended the album, saying "standing on the previous work of Black Rain, Dark Pool reads as an evolution rather that a sudden jump to the present, and smart sequencing increases the overall effectiveness of the music to lend a narrative feel to the album."

== Track listing ==
All tracks are written by Stuart Argabright, except "Profusion II" co-written with Alison Lewis.

No.	Title	Length
1.	"Dark Pool"	0:53
2.	"Profusion"	2:47
3.	"Watering Hole"	3:16
4.	"Endourban"	4:00
5.	"Burst"	3:22
6.	"Xibalba Road Metamorph"	5:31
7.	"Data River"	4:27
8.	"Night in New Chiang Saen"	3:46
9.	"Protoplasm"	6:28
10.	"Profusion II (fallofthehouseofagodabiomechanical)"	3:42
11.	"Who Will Save the Tiger?"	2:48

== Personnel ==
Adapted from the Dark Pool liner notes.

Black Rain

- Stuart Argabright – instruments, production

Production and design

- Oliver Chapoy – co-producer, engineering, mixing
- Matt Colton – mastering
- Oliver Smith – design

== Release history ==
Region	Date	Label	Format	Catalog
United Kingdom	2014	Blackest Ever Black	CS, DL, LP	BLACKEST009
