= Frenzied Computer Resonance =

Compilation album by Various artists
- Released: 1994
- Genre: Industrial rock; electronic
- Length: 40:32
- Label: Fifth Colvmn

Fifth Colvmn Records chronology
Melt (1992)	Frenzied Computer Resonance (1994)	Melt - Scandinavian Electro/Industrial Compilation (1994)

Frenzied Computer Resonance is a various artists compilation album released in 1994 by Fifth Colvmn Records. The collection comprises tracks by Acumen, Chemlab, haloblack and Perceptual Outer Dimensions, which were released on their albums Transmissions from Eville (1994), Burn Out at the Hydrogen Bar (1993), Tension Filter (1994) and The Journey to Planet POD (1994).

== Track listing ==
Holy Shit Side
No.	Title	Writer(s)	Artist	Length
1.	"Matador"	Ethan Novak; Gregory A. Lopez; Jamie Duffy; Jason Novak	Acumen	5:30
2.	"Chemical Halo" (Remix)	Jared Louche; Dylan Thomas More	Chemlab	5:32
3.	"Decay"	Bryan Barton	haloblack	2:57
4.	"Hinge"	Holmes Ives	Perceptual Outer Dimensions	6:57

Get Fuckin' Down Side
No.	Title	Writer(s)	Artist	Length
1.	"Gun Lover"	Ethan Novak; Gregory A. Lopez; Jamie Duffy; Jason Novak	Acumen	4:27
2.	"21st Century"	Jared Louche; Dylan Thomas More	Chemlab	4:54
3.	"Deep..."	Bryan Barton	haloblack	4:39
4.	"Lurid Dance of the Erimite"	Holmes Ives	Perceptual Outer Dimensions	5:36

== Personnel ==
Adapted from the Frenzied Computer Resonance liner notes.

- Klacorous Inebirtatus – cover art, illustrations, design

== Release history ==
Region	Date	Label	Format
United States	1994	Fifth Colvmn	CS
