= Life & Death (album) =

Studio album by Thud
- Released: 1992
- Studio: Oz Studio (Baltimore, Maryland)
- Genre: Death-doom; thrash metal
- Length: 36:22
- Label: Fifth Colvmn
- Producer: Robert Dotolo; Barrett Jones

Thud chronology
Life & Death (1992)	Inevitable (1993)

Life & Death is the debut studio album by Thud, released in 1992 by Fifth Colvmn Records. In April 2015 the lead track "Ventilator" was played on Diane's Kamikaze Fun Machine: Playlist on WMUC-FM.

== Reception ==
Professional ratings
Review scores
Source	Rating
AllMusic	3/5 stars

AllMusic gave Life & Death gave three out of five possible stars. Fabryka Music Magazine awarded the album a flawless rating of four out of four stars, describing it as "heaviest Fifth Colvmn album" and "a violent assault of great rock and heavy metal."

== Track listing ==
All tracks are written by Robert Dotolo, Gregg Hudson, Chris Rasley and Adam Rutland, except "Ventilator" co-written by Jared Louche.

No.	Title	Length
1.	"Ventilator"	3:13
2.	"Blind Judgement"	3:44
3.	"Black Whole"	2:38
4.	"Contradiction"	3:40
5.	"Shell Shock"	4:38
6.	"Hustle"	2:03
7.	"Image Pig"	2:27
8.	"Temptation"	3:05
9.	"Rain"	3:11
10.	"Lose"	2:52
11.	"Loaded"	2:28
12.	"Nod"	2:23

== Personnel ==
Adapted from the Life & Death liner notes.

Thud

- Robert Dotolo – lead vocals, guitars, production, mixing
- Gregg Hudson – drums, backing vocals
- Chris Rasley – bass guitar, guitar (1)
- Adam Rutland – guitar, backing vocals

Additional performers

- Eli Janney – engineering, piano (3)
- Barrett Jones – production, mixing, backing vocals (7)
- Jared Louche – production, mixing, additional guitar (1)

Production and design

- Craig Albertson (at CyberGrafiks) – photography
- Zalman Fishman – executive-producer
- Dave Harris – mastering
- Phil Merkle – cover art
- Nikolas H. Huffman – design

== Release history ==
Region	Date	Label	Format	Catalog
United States	1992	Fifth Colvmn	CD	FCR 002
