= Screaming Down the Gravity Well =

Studio album by Death Ride 69
- Released: 1996
- Genre: Gothic rock, industrial rock
- Length: 73:13
- Label: Fifth Colvmn
- Producer: Mark Blasquez, Buzz McCoy

Death Ride 69 chronology
| Death Ride 69 (1988) | Screaming Down the Gravity Well (1996) |

Professional ratings
Review scores
| Source | Rating |
|---|---|
| Allmusic | 2.5/5 stars |

Screaming Down the Gravity Well is the second studio album by Death Ride 69, released in 1996 by Fifth Colvmn Records. Marco Gariboldi of Fabryka called the album "a crescendo of harsh guitars, distortions and hammering drums directed by the high and charismatic voice of Linda" and "a very good album by an underrated and forgotten band." Aiding & Abetting was more critical, saying "the general lack of creative thought in the songwriting is pretty distressing" and claiming the band was "scraping the bottom of the barrel."

== Track listing ==
All tracks are written by Mark Blasquez and Linda LeSabre, except "Penetrator" by Buck McGibbony and "Elvis Christ: The Resurrection" co-written with Don Diego.

| No. | Title | Length |
|---|---|---|
| 1. | "First Contact" | 0:54 |
| 2. | "Needle" | 4:53 |
| 3. | "Fucked Up Generation" | 3:47 |
| 4. | "Penetrator" | 5:23 |
| 5. | "MK Ultra" | 4:47 |
| 6. | "Digital Submission" | 4:52 |
| 7. | "Screaming Down The Gravity Well" | 4:29 |
| 8. | "The Razor Girl Machine" | 3:53 |
| 9. | "Sinister Fetish" | 4:31 |
| 10. | "Super Hot Sister 69" | 4:05 |
| 11. | "I, Virus" | 4:26 |
| 12. | "Elvis Christ: The Resurrection" | 4:50 |
| 13. | "Long Dirty Needle" | 6:40 |
| 14. | "[Silence]" (Track 15 to 68 are blank tracks) | 0:04 |
| 69. | "Sisela Etahi" (hidden track) | 4:29 |

== Personnel ==
Adapted from the Screaming Down the Gravity Well liner notes.

Death Ride 69

- Mark Blasquez – electric guitar, bass guitar, programming, production
- Linda LeSabre – lead vocals, drums, sampler, drum programming

Additional musicians

- DJ Hothead – vocals (2)
- Groovie Mann – vocals (2, 10)

Production and design

- D. Dawson – photography
- Rob Gibson – cover art
- Doug Green – recording, mixing
- Buzz McCoy – production

== Release history ==
| Region | Date | Label | Format | Catalog |
|---|---|---|---|---|
| United States | 1996 | Fifth Colvmn | CD | 9868-63221 |
| United States | 1999 | Invisible | CD | INV 153 |
