= Black Reign =

Black Reign may refer to:

- Black Reign (album), a 1993 album by Queen Latifah
- Black Reign (EP), a 2018 EP by Avenged Sevenfold
- Black Reign (wrestler), American professional wrestler better known by the name Goldust
- 'Black Reign", a song by Quiet Riot, from the album Rehab
- “Black Reign”, The second album of the Prophets of Rage

== See also ==
- Black Rain (disambiguation)
