= Ultimate Abyss =

EP by Sphere Lazza
- Released: January 1, 2005
- Genre: Electronic; industrial
- Length: 34:51
- Label: AcidVictim
- Producer: Tony Spaz; David Trousdale

Sphere Lazza chronology
The Enemy Within (1995)	Ultimate Abyss (2005)

Ultimate Abyss is the fourth EP by Sphere Lazza, released on January 1, 2005, by AcidVictim Records.

== Reception ==
Brutal Resonance called Ultimate Abyss "very interesting" and that "Trousdale have occasionally a really great voice with a style you don't hear that often in the EBM-genre." Chain D.L.K. said "you get an even better sense of just how good Trousdale's vocals are for the material, and how good the material is when compared with a lot of drek you find out there these days." Funprox called the music "good for the dance-floors as well" and "with this single Sphere Lazza gives a new sign of life."

== Track listing ==
All tracks are written by Tony Spaz and David Trousdale.

No.	Title	Length
1.	"Ultimate Abyss"	4:11
2.	"Ultimate Abyss" (Gravitational Collapse Mix)	5:38
3.	"Ultimate Abyss" (Cygnusx-1 Remix-1)	4:23
4.	"Nemesis" (Menacing Orbit mix)	5:49
5.	"Terminal Ferocity"	5:03
6.	"Distance"	5:02
7.	"Dark Energy" (Version 1)	4:45

Digital issue bonus tracks
No.	Title	Length
8.	"Velocity of Dreams"	3:55
9.	"Untitled 10"	4:54
10.	"Untitled 10"	4:24

== Personnel ==
Adapted from the Ultimate Abyss liner notes.

Sphere Lazza

- Tony Spaz – instruments, production
- David Trousdale – vocals, instruments, production

== Release history ==
Region	Date	Label	Format	Catalog
United States	2005	AcidVictim	CD	avr004
