= EX (Ipecac Loop album) =

eX

Studio album by Ipecac Loop
- Released: August 29, 1995
- Studio: REP Studios (Ithaca, New York)
- Genre: Electronic; ambient
- Length: 47:55
- Label: Fifth Colvmn
- Producer: Cameron Lewis

Alternative cover
- 1998 remaster

eX is the debut studio album by Ipecac Loop, released on August 29, 1995 by Fifth Colvmn Records.

== Music ==
Compositions from eX, namely "Backbreaker" and "Clusterfuck", were released on the Forced Cranial Removal, Mind/Body Compilation Volume 2 and The Best of Mind/Body: Electro-Industrial Music From the Internet compilations by Fifth Colvmn and Atomic Novelties. Later "Backbreaker" and "Music Box" were later released on Mind/Body Compilation Volume 3 by Atomic Novelties and DIY Productions and Amduscias by Zenflesh, released respectively in 1996 and 1998.

== Reception ==
Sonic Boom said "focusing on a minimalistic approach to sound construction Ipecac Loop provides access to realm where a lack aural depth doesn't deter from the overall quality of the music" and "percolating trickles of ambience drip from extreme heights into a swirling pool of radiance sound."

== Track listing ==
All music is composed by Cameron Lewis.

No.	Title	Length
1.	"Ipecac (All of It)"	2:03
2.	"Clusterfuck"	4:51
3.	"Again and Again"	4:38
4.	"Blinded"	2:09
5.	"Out of My Spine"	4:54
6.	"Backbreaker"	6:36
7.	"Mountains and Fleas"	2:24
8.	"Vacuum"	7:33
9.	"Music Box"	1:04
10.	"Blur"	6:51
11.	"Repress"	5:00

== Personnel ==
Adapted from the eX liner notes.

Ipecac Loop

- Cameron Lewis – instruments, production, engineering, mixing, design

Production and design

- Andre Knecht – mastering
- Adrian Mulvaney – photography

== Release history ==
Region	Date	Label	Format	Catalog
United States	1995	Fifth Colvmn	CD	9868-63196
United States	1998	Forced Evolution	CD	FEM-001
