= The Best of Mind/Body: Electro-Industrial Music From the Internet =

1995 compilation album by various artists

Compilation album by Various artists
- Released: May 2, 1995
- Genre: Electro; industrial
- Length: 69:08
- Label: Fifth Colvmn

Fifth Colvmn Records chronology
Document 01 - Trance/Tribal (1994)	The Best of Mind/Body: Electro-Industrial Music From the Internet (1995)	Forced Cranial Removal (1995)

The Best of Mind/Body: Electro-Industrial Music From the Internet is a various artists compilation album released on May 2, 1995, by Fifth Colvmn Records.

== Reception ==
Professional ratings
Review scores
Source	Rating
AllMusic	4.5/5 stars

AllMusic awarded The Best of Mind/Body four and a half out of five stars and said "this industrial/electronica compilation, previously released on Atomic Novelties, was culled from tracks distributed through the Internet." Sonic Boom noted that "a wide variety of experimental music is featured so if you don't already have the RMI Mind/Body compilation CD's you might want to check out some of the unsigned talent featured here."

== Track listing ==
No.	Title	Writer(s)	Artist	Length
1.	"New Age Love Song"	Neil Herzinger	Grae.Com	4:10
2.	"Vicious Circle"	Mason Jones	Trance	4:55
3.	"Burning Chrome"	Randall L Wolf	Soma Holiday	2:37
4.	"Shit All Over You"	Liz Fox; Rodger Stella; David Thrussell	Surgery Tomorrow	6:24
5.	"Born to Be Mild"	Thrussell	Snog	3:24
6.	"Holiday"	Tom Plinzke; Daevid Vincent	Who Mournes	6:06
7.	"Holiday"	Mark Gunderson	The Evolution Control Committee	3:04
8.	"Sketches of Pain"	Mark Kirschenmann; Mike DeMurga	Spleenclutch	6:14
9.	"Get the Fork '94"	Markleford Friedman	Noisia	7:21
10.	"Failure"	Philip Caldwell; Steve Watkins	Scar Tissue	5:37
11.	"Clusterfuck"	Cameron Lewis	Ipecac Loop	6:54
12.	"Industry"	Chris Arevalo; Michael Ortega	30 Helens Agree	3:33
13.	"LD 50"	Tony Spaz; David Trousdale	Sphere Lazza	2:34
14.	"SpaceLoop"	Pasi Nummisalo	Cyber-G	2:39
15.	"C³"	David Schlick; Jeff Smith	Bureau of Control	3:36

== Personnel ==
Adapted from The Best of Mind/Body: Electro-Industrial Music From the Internet liner notes.

- Zalman Fishman – executive-producer
- Andre Knecht – mastering

== Release history ==
Region	Date	Label	Format	Catalog
United States	1995	Fifth Colvmn	CD	9868-63186
