= The Journey to Planet POD =

Studio album by Perceptual Outer Dimensions
- Released: August 1, 1994
- Studio: POD Studios (Virginia)
- Genre: Electronic; downtempo
- Length: 67:39
- Label: Fifth Colvmn
- Producer: Holmes Ives

Perceptual Outer Dimensions chronology
The Journey to Planet POD (1994)	Euphonia (1995)

The Journey to Planet POD is the debut studio album by Perceptual Outer Dimensions, released on August 1, 1994 by Fifth Colvmn Records.

== Music ==
Prior to the release of The Journey to Planet POD, composer Holmes Ives had released "Hinge" and "Lurid Dance of the Erimite" on the 1994 Fifth Colvmn Records compilation Frenzied Computer Resonance.

== Reception ==
Option described The Journey to Planet POD as "a unique ambient project that mixes elements of "found" sounds into an intricate web that borders on rapture." Sonic Boom praised the album for its "invigorating programming style, unique percussion, and vivid samples" and called it "a trip to another planet, someplace where the listener needs to never stop moving to the music, and the dj never stops mixing up a new track."

== Track listing ==
All tracks are written by Holmes Ives.

No.	Title	Length
1.	"Planet Pod"	5:49
2.	"Hoodoo"	5:56
3.	"Rafflesia"	4:41
4.	"Hinge"	7:11
5.	"Goofed Again"	5:52
6.	"Salem"	5:26
7.	"Translunar Injection"	4:13
8.	"Aquanaut"	5:02
9.	"Zhin"	5:34
10.	"Bowbeana"	6:07
11.	"Lurid Dance of the Erimite"	5:52
12.	"Melliflous"	5:56

== Personnel ==
Adapted from the liner notes of The Journey to Planet POD.

Perceptual Outer Dimensions

- Holmes Ives – instruments, production, recording, mixing

Production and design

- Craig Albertson – cover art
- Tom Baker – mastering
- Zalman Fishman – executive-production

== Release history ==
Region	Date	Label	Format	Catalog
United States	1994	Fifth Colvmn	CD	9868-63183
