= Melt (compilation album) =

Compilation album by Various artists
- Released: 1992
- Genres: Electronic; noise
- Length: 67:30
- Label: Work in Progress

Fifth Colvmn Records chronology
Melt (1992)	Frenzied Computer Resonance (1994)

Alternative cover
- 1996 reissue cover

Melt (or Dissolve: A Work in Progress Compilation) is a various artists compilation album released in 1992 by Work in Progress. It was later reissued on May 7, 1996 by Fused Coil, a division of Fifth Colvmn Records.

== Reception ==
In their review of the re-issue of Melt, Aiding & Abetting said "many of these tracks are immaculately and meticulously produced sets of noise" and "you can feel the texture and luxuriate in the quality."

== Track listing ==
No.	Title	Artist	Length
1.	"Hymn L'Amour"	Beequeen	2:43
2.	"Fragment 1"	Antonym	3:03
3.	"Russolo"	Another Headache	9:56
4.	"The Long Whip of Persuasion"	Master/Slave Relationship	5:11
5.	"Drift 4"	Lee Ranaldo	3:04
6.	"Soft and Close By Me"	Zoviet France	3:55
7.	"Millbrook"	dROME	3:04
8.	"Lodestar"	Husk	4:30
9.	"Shit Eater"	Whiteslug	2:56
10.	"I Fuck Therefore I Am"	Earth Mother Fucker	3:21
11.	"2,000 Amplified Sunshine"	Hanatarash	5:19
12.	"The Reward of Cruelty"	Hydra	5:52
13.	"Anal Beethoven"	The Gerogerigegege	4:26
14.	"Suzunne Erica Is Sunohara Yuri"	Merzbow	10:19
15.	"Sad Song"	Fat Hacker	0:54

== Personnel ==
Adapted from the Melt liner notes.

- Andrew Firman – cover art, illustrations
- Freek Kinkelaar – cover art

== Release history ==
Region	Date	Label	Format	Catalog
United Kingdom	1992	Work in Progress	CD	WIP 002
United States	1996	Fused Coil	CD	9868-63222
