= Max M =

- Also known as: Jay K., Stereoids
- Origin: Odense, Funen, Denmark
- Genres: Electro; EBM; industrial
- Years active: 1992–present
- Labels: Hard
- Past members: Max Møller Rasmussen
- Website: mxm.dk

Max M was the music project of composer Max Møller Rasmussen, based in Odense, Denmark. He released two albums studio albums for Hard Records titled Technology Is God and Max M Corporation, respectively released in 1992 and 1994.

== History ==
Max M was founded by Danish composer Max Møller Rasmussen in as a solo outlet for his work. He self-released the EP Get Wild on vinyl record. and contained the guitar contributions of Carsten Lassen, who helped Rasmussen record his previous release. Max M released his debut studio album, titled Technology Is God, for Hard Records in 1992. Max M also released the off-album track "Atomic Playboy" to the Danish music compilation Cyberworld by Playground Records.

In 1994 Max M released Max M Corporation, which contained a graphic novel and accompanying music on its multimedia CD-ROM. Rasmussen composed "Cyberworld" and released as the lead track to 1994's Cyberworld II compilation. The album was reissued the following year by Fifth Colvmn Records in April. The compositions "A Day on the Net" and "The Rookie SpaceCadet" were released on Cleopatra Records various artists compilations, respectively titled Electro Industrial Assassins and Hard Target: A Collection of Electronic and Industrial Music From Hard Records. In 2012 Max M released "Længes Efter Storm" for the Cyberworld XX compilation on Braincorp.

== Discography ==
Studio albums

- Technology Is God (1992, Hard)
- Max M Corporation (1994, Hard)

Extended play

- Get Wild (1992)

Compilation appearances

- Secrets 4 (1991, Rosa)
- Cyberworld (1992, Playground)
- Music From Denmark (1993, MXP)
- There's Something Rocking in the State of Denmark (1994, MXP)
- Cyberworld II (1994, Hard)
- Electro Industrial Assassins (1995, Cleopatra)
- Hard Target: A Collection of Electronic and Industrial Music From Hard Records (1996, Cleopatra)
- Hard Industrial Work (5 Year Anniversary of Hard Records) (1998, Cleopatra)
- Industrial Madness Volume 2 (1999, Cleopatra)
- Cyberworld XX (2012, Braincorp.)
