= Rebellion Is Over =

2015 EP by Genesis Breyer P-Orridge/Black Rain/Cold Cave

EP by Genesis Breyer P-Orridge/Black Rain/Cold Cave
- Released: October 15, 2015
- Genre: Ambient; industrial
- Length: 10:07
- Label: Dais

Black Rain chronology
Apophis (2015)	Rebellion Is Over (2015)	Metal Rain 1989-93 (2018)

Cold Cave chronology
Full Cold Moon (2014)	Rebellion Is Over (2015)	You & Me & Infinity (2018)

Alternative cover
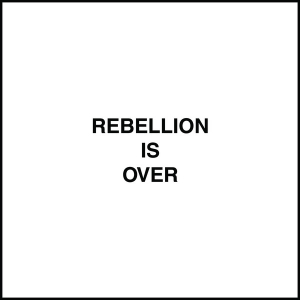
- 7" cover

Rebellion Is Over is a split EP by Genesis Breyer P-Orridge, Black Rain and Cold Cave, released on October 15, 2015, by Dais Records.

== Track listing ==
Side one
No.	Title	Artist	Length
1.	"Rebellion Is Over"	Genesis Breyer P-Orridge Cold Cave Black Rain	4:20
2.	"Stay Faithful to the Faithless"	Cold Cave Black Rain	0:51

Side two
No.	Title	Artist	Length
1.	"Comprehension"	Genesis Breyer P-Orridge Cold Cave Black Rain	4:56

== Personnel ==
Adapted from the Rebellion Is Over liner notes.

Musicians

- Stuart Argabright (as Black Rain) – instruments (A2)
- Wesley Eisold (as Cold Cave) – instruments (B)
- Genesis Breyer P-Orridge – instruments (A1)

== Release history ==
Region	Date	Label	Format	Catalog
United States	2015	Dais	LP	DAIS 080
United States	2015	Heartworm Press	CS	#64
