= "Helen Butte" vs. Masonna Pussy Badsmell =

Studio album by To Live and Shave in L.A.
- Released: August 6, 1996
- Recorded: 1993 – 1994
- Studio: Sync Studios (Miami, Florida)
- Genre: Noise
- Length: 70:47
- Label: Full Contact

"Helen Butte" vs. Masonna Pussy Badsmell is a studio album by To Live and Shave in L.A., released on August 6, 1996 by Full Contact Records.

== Release and reception ==
Professional ratings
Review scores
Source	Rating
AllMusic	2/5 stars

Aiding & Abetting called "Helen Butte" vs. Masonna Pussy Badsmell "a nice collection of random musical violence. To Live and Shave in L.A. already has a fine reputation for this sort of musical mayhem, and this album does not disappoint." AllMusic gave the album two out of five stars, calling it a "disturbing cacophony melted on in several, short pieces" and a "predictable gimmick that wears thin early." Jeff Bagato of the Washington City Paper enjoyed and said "musically, Moog, bass, guitar, and lots of tape manipulation (heavy-metal records are particularly in evidence) are sucked into the black hole of Tom Smith's mixing board and condensed into piles of slurred, guttural ranting, static, and broken rock."

== Track listing ==
All lyrics are written by Tom Smith, except "Television's Over" by T. V. Smith; all music is composed by Frank Falestra, Tom Smith and Ben Wolcott, except "Television's Over" by T. V. Smith.

No.	Title	Length
1.	"Root of Pop Compulsion"	1:20
2.	"Tina Russell, Free"	1:05
3.	"Take a Lot of Ofay"	1:41
4.	"The Ass God"	2:08
5.	"Open City '72"	1:12
6.	"Shit If They Hit"	1:10
7.	"Spelvin, The Righteous Bush"	1:18
8.	"Veinsearchin'"	1:45
9.	"Superhype Security Probe"	1:59
10.	"My Third Decade of Ultrafuck"	4:41
11.	"Crypt Rocket, Tomb Rocket, Turd Rocket"	1:09
12.	"The "Six" in the Six Wolves"	1:41
13.	"Mizrahi Speculum"	2:03
14.	"I Learn to Inject Morphia"	1:34
15.	"Lady Dedlock"	2:04
16.	"Hypercuff"	1:17
17.	"A Low Mass Will Be Said"	2:00
18.	"I Suppress Nothing"	1:58
19.	"Wanna Bust Up a Virgin Ass?"	1:39
20.	"One Navel of Decline"	1:51
21.	"Rexroth, Cozy Cool"	1:06
22.	"I Used to Pay a Heavy Bribe"	2:23
23.	"Kama Sutra '71"	1:25
24.	"Anne's Eager Bottom"	1:12
25.	"Shivman Destroys Spoonman"	4:04
26.	""Godspike" Soph. Hoax"	1:17
27.	"Theresa Soder in My Hot Hands"	1:29
28.	"Television's Over" (The Adverts cover)	3:58
29.	"American Car"	1:42
30.	"Gone and Bitched Up"	1:38
31.	"I Slur a Name"	2:14
32.	"Tealink"	1:09
33.	"First Pop Novice"	0:58
34.	"Lock of Gut Twine"	2:20
35.	"Balling Andrea True"	1:06
36.	"Bataille= No Stipe"	4:04
37.	"In the Assworks"	3:07

== Personnel ==
Adapted from the "Helen Butte" vs. Masonna Pussy Badsmell liner notes.

To Live and Shave in L.A.

- Frank Falestra (as Rat Bastard) – bass guitar
- Tom Smith – lead vocals, tape, electronics, engineering, recording, mixing
- Ben Wolcott – electronics

Production and design

- Greg Chapman – liner notes
- Zalman Fishman – executive-production
- Priscilla Forthman – photography
- Sam Patton – photography
- Syd – design
- Angela Terrell – photography

== Release history ==
Region	Date	Label	Format	Catalog
United States	1996	Full Contact	CD	9868-63235
