= 1.0 (album) =

Studio album by Black Rain
- Released: July 25, 1995
- Studio: Various: Current Sounds; (New York City, New York); Shimokawa Studio; (New York City, New York); Water Studios; (New York City, New York)
- Genre: Industrial; ambient
- Length: 63:03
- Label: Fifth Colvmn
- Producer: Stuart Argabright; Chaz Cardoza; Thom Furtado; Shinichi Shimokawa

Black Rain chronology
Black Rain (1993)	1.0 (1995)	Nanarchy (1996)

1.0 is the debut studio album by Black Rain, released on July 25, 1995 by Fifth Colvmn Records. The album was originally intended to be used as the score for the 1995 film Johnny Mnemonic by Robert Longo.

== Reception ==
Sonic Boom said "the music does a much better job of backing up the film than the actual soundtrack does" and said "regardless of whither or not you enjoyed Johnny Mnemonic I suggest you pick up this soundtrack."

== Track listing ==
All tracks are written by Stuart Argabright, Chaz Cardoza, Thom Furtado and Shinichi Shimokawa.

No.	Title	Length
1.	"Memory Johnny"	3:38
2.	"Lo Tek"	1:14
3.	"Brain Drop"	2:32
4.	"Night City.Tokyo"	6:11
5.	"Arcade One"	0:43
6.	"Lo Tek Bridge"	2:40
7.	"Now I'm Just a Number"	11:31
8.	"Biotechno 1"	6:12
9.	"Biotechno 2"	4:30
10.	"Lo Tek Musicm"	4:54
11.	"Lo Tek Bridge Two"	4:55
12.	"Metal Rain"	3:46
13.	"C-Factor"	4:29
14.	"Brain Drop" (Remix)	2:15
15.	"Memory Rain"	3:32

== Personnel ==
Adapted from the 1.0 liner notes.

Black Rain

- Stuart Argabright – instruments, mixing, production
- Chaz Cardoza – instruments, production, mixing
- Thom Furtado – instruments, production, mixing
- Shinichi Shimokawa – instruments, mixing (1–12, 14, 15), production

Production and design

- Joseph Bartoldus – mixing
- Catherine Eng – design
- Zalman Fishman – executive-production
- Franz Treichler – mixing (12)
- Jim Waters – production (12, 13)

== Release history ==
Region	Date	Label	Format	Catalog
United States	1995	Fifth Colvmn	CD	9868-63193
