= Metal Rain 1989–93 =

Compilation album by Black Rain
- Released: November 16, 2018
- Recorded: 1989–1993
- Studio: Various: Toxic; (New York City); CBGB's; (Manhattan, New York City)
- Genre: Industrial; noise rock
- Length: 52:31
- Label: Blackest Ever Black

Black Rain chronology
Rebellion Is Over (2015)	Metal Rain 1989–93 (2018)	Computer Soul (2019)

Metal Rain 1989–93 is a compilation album by Black Rain, released on November 16, 2018 by DKA Records.

== Track listing ==
All tracks are written by Stuart Argabright.

Side one
No.	Title	Length
1.	"Metal Rain"	3:46
2.	"Imagelust"	4:06
3.	"Here Today Gone Today"	3:56
4.	"Slipstream"	3:29
5.	"Hope"	3:16
6.	"Wired Ambient"	5:54

Side two
No.	Title	Length
1.	"Violence Channel"	5:05
2.	"Nuclear Village"	2:32
3.	"C Factor"	4:29
4.	"No More idols"	8:02
5.	"The Kamps"	6:56

== Personnel ==
Adapted from the Metal Rain 1989–93 liner notes.

Black Rain

- Stuart Argabright – vocals, effects, percussion
- Chaz Cardoza (as Bones) – bass guitar, effects, vocals
- Thom Furtado – drums, percussion
- Shinichi Shimokawa – guitar, effects

Production and design

- Dietrich Schoenemann – mastering
- Hiroko Kawasaki – cover art, photography

== Release history ==
Region	Date	Label	Format	Catalog
United Kingdom	2018	DKA	CS, DL, LP	DKA019
