= Junk (Shinjuku Filth album) =

Studio album by Shinjuku Filth
- Released: 1995
- Recorded: 1992 – 1995
- Genre: Dark ambient; industrial
- Length: 39:04
- Label: Iridium

Darrin Verhagen chronology
The Witch Hunter (1995)	Junk (1995)	Raised by Wolves (1997)

Alternative cover
- 1996 reissue

Junk is the debut studio album of Shinjuku Filth, released in 1995 by Iridium Records. On May 21, 1996 the album was reissued on Full Contact Records.

== Reception ==
Professional ratings
Review scores
Source	Rating
AllMusic	3/5 stars

Aiding & Abetting called Junk a "strident, brutal and ultimately beautiful work" and that "Shinjuku Filth has sonic construction (and reconstruction) down, and has ventured into a few previously unexplored territory here." Jason Ankeny of AllMusic awarded the album three out of five stars and said "the music ranges from hard-body dance to more ambient soundscapes; the penultimate track is, of all things, a cover of the Split Enz chestnut "Log Cabin Fever." Sonic Boom said "part of the musical allurement is derived from the fact for once a band with extensive musical training is now experimenting with some of the more popular electronic musical styles and as an end result is advancing the genre beyond the tunnel vision sights of some of the other premier electronic club bands."

== Track listing ==
All music is composed by François Tétaz and Darrin Verhagen, except "Log Cabin Fever" by Neil Finn

No.	Title	Length
1.	"Detox"	4:11
2.	"Showered in Glass"	3:54
3.	"Urashima Taro"	1:52
4.	"Bridge Sermon"	3:17
5.	"The Junk"	3:06
6.	"Vogelfrei II"	2:30
7.	"Fade" (Remix)	4:19
8.	"Eugenics (1st Movement)"	4:11
9.	"Obsidious" (Mudmix)	2:39
10.	"Log Cabin Fever" (Split Enz cover)	2:35
11.	"17/21"	6:29

== Personnel ==
Adapted from the Junk liner notes.

Black Lung

- Darrin Verhagen – keyboards

Additional performers

- Peter Breuer – instruments
- Paul McDermott – instruments
- Anthony Norris – instruments
- Paul Schütze – instruments
- Mark Stafford – instruments

Production and design

- Zalman Fishman – executive-producer
- Richard Grant (I+T=R) – design

== Release history ==
Region	Date	Label	Format	Catalog
Australia	1995	Iridium	CD	P305
United States	1996	Full Contact	CD	9868-63225
