= Euphonia (album) =

Studio album by Perceptual Outer Dimensions
- Released: September 19, 1995
- Studio: POD Studios (Virginia)
- Genre: industrial; downtempo
- Length: 72:43
- Label: Fifth Colvmn
- Producer: Holmes Ives

Perceptual Outer Dimensions chronology
The Journey to Planet POD (1994)	Euphonia (1995)

Euphonia is the second studio album by Perceptual Outer Dimensions, released on September 19, 1995 by Fifth Colvmn Records.

== Music ==
Composer Holmes Ives had recorded and released The Journey to Planet POD on Fifth Colvmn Records compilation. The composition "De La Luna" was released for the Fifth Colvmn compilation Forced Cranial Removal.

== Reception ==
Sonic Boom described Euphonia as an album "nothing short of astounding in its complexity and depth" that "creates an acoustic effect produced by musical patterns combined as to please the ear or euphony."

== Track listing ==
All tracks are written by Holmes Ives.

No.	Title	Length
1.	"Preludeum"	0:18
2.	"Euphonia"	5:28
3.	"Voltaic"	4:38
4.	"Neophilia"	5:06
5.	"Eliquaform"	4:28
6.	"De La Luna"	4:52
7.	"Neptunium"	5:20
8.	"Enchanted Loom"	4:26
9.	"Inamorata"	5:21
10.	"Compucosis"	5:46
11.	"Macrocosm"	5:25
12.	"Cathode"	5:35
13.	"Maelstrom"	4:24
14.	"Thanatopsis"	5:22
15.	"Nocturnal Montage"	5:10
16.	"Terminus"	1:03

== Personnel ==
Adapted from the Euphonia liner notes.

Perceptual Outer Dimensions

- Holmes Ives – instruments, production, recording, mixing

Additional performers

- Laura O'Neil – vocals

Production and design

- Tom Baker – mastering
- Zalman Fishman – executive-production
- Phil Merkle – cover art, illustrations, photography
- Tim Steenstra – cover art, illustrations, photography

== Release history ==
Region	Date	Label	Format	Catalog
United States	1995	Fifth Colvmn	CD	9868-63207
