= Melt - Scandinavian Electro/Industrial Compilation =

Compilation album by Various artists
- Released: 1994
- Genre: Electro-industrial
- Length: 77:16
- Label: Cyberware Productions

Fifth Colvmn Records chronology
| Frenzied Computer Resonance (1994) | Melt - Scandinavian Electro/Industrial Compilation (1994) | Document 01 - Trance/Tribal (1994) |

Melt - Scandinavian Electro/Industrial Compilation is a various artists compilation album released in 1994 by Cyberware Productions. The album was reissued on April 9, 1996, by Fifth Colvmn Records.

== Reception ==
Professional ratings
Review scores
| Source | Rating |
|---|---|
| AllMusic | 2.5/5 stars |

Aiding & Abetting called "Melt "inconsistent" and "for every decent gothic pop bit like Neuroactive's "Obsession" there's at least one song that just doesn't work." AllMusic awarded the collection two and a half out of five stars and said "Melt culls releases from the Scandinavian-based label Cyberware Records, whose roster of artists runs the gamut from industrial to techno to ambient." Sonic Boom noted that "the first half of the compilation consists of more popular EBM style electro with the music slowly transitioning to darkwave instrumentals of a more experimental nature as the album progresses."

== Track listing ==
| No. | Title | Writer(s) | Artist | Length |
|---|---|---|---|---|
| 1. | "Plutonium" | Sven Andersson | Bizarre Alliance | 3:51 |
| 2. | "Burnin' Heretic" (Guitarless Edit) | Stephan Groth | Apoptygma Berzerk | 5:34 |
| 3. | "Obsession" (Plastic Mix) | Ville Brusi; Vesa Rainne; Jarkko Tuohimaa | Neuroactive | 4:19 |
| 4. | "Mindhallucination" (Brain Mix) | Kim Løhde Petersen; Michael Hillerup | Birmingham 6 | 5:15 |
| 5. | "Cybers" | Alex Jarlev; Eskild Trulsen; Jørgen Aase; Rune Kruse; Tarjei E. Krogh; Tomas Kulberg; Truls Are Bakken | Anstalt | 4:06 |
| 6. | "No Rest for the Wicked" (No Vox Version) | Claus Larsen | Leæther Strip | 5:30 |
| 7. | "Gunmaster" | | The Insult That Made a Man Out of Mac | 2:51 |
| 8. | "Halfdaudur" | Indriði Einarsson; Guðjón Rúdólf Guðmundsson; Örn Ingólfsson; Þorri Jóhannsson; Ómar Stefánsson; Óskar Thorarensen | Inferno 5 | 4:42 |
| 9. | "Sometimes I Dream" | Martin Danielsson; Juho Korhonen; Johan Linder | Malaise | 5:25 |
| 10. | "Addicts" | Remyl | Remyl | 3:12 |
| 11. | "Netspace Cowboy" | Joni Leimu; Olli Mäkelä; Karri Suksia | Chaingun Operate | 4:03 |
| 12. | "Oidipus Rex" (Video Version) | Per Aksel Lundgreen | Angst Pop | 4:16 |
| 13. | "Fifth Skin" (Close Cyberware Mix) | Jouni Havukainen | In Slaughter Natives | 5:58 |
| 14. | "Random Succession" | Jóhann Eiríksson; G.I. Markússon | Reptilicus | 3:04 |
| 15. | "Under Ten Lies" (Club Slayer Edit) | Petri Huttunen; Timo Väänänen | Shade Factory | 5:39 |
| 16. | "Lost" | Annelie Bertilsson; Magnus Fransson; Joel Rydström | Cat Rapes Dog | 3:52 |
| 17. | "The Broken Glass of Shattered Dreams" | | In Absentia | 5:38 |

== Personnel ==
Adapted from the Melt - Scandinavian Electro/Industrial Compilation liner notes.

- Karri Suksia – compiling
- Jarkko Tuohimaa – mastering

== Release history ==
| Region | Date | Label | Format | Catalog |
|---|---|---|---|---|
| Finland | 1994 | Cyberware Productions | CD | NET002 |
| United States | 1996 | Fifth Colvmn | CD | 9868-63217 |
