= Apophis (EP) =

EP by Black Rain & Shapednoise
- Released: August 20, 2015
- Genre: Industrial; power noise; techno
- Length: 20:11
- Label: Blackest Ever Black
- Producer: Stuart Argabright

Black Rain chronology
Dark Pool (2014)	Apophis (2015)	Rebellion Is Over (2015)

Apophis is an EP by Black Rain and Shapednoise, released on August 20, 2015 by Blackest Ever Black.

== Track listing ==
All tracks are written by Stuart Argabright and Nino Pedone.

Side one
No.	Title	Length
1.	"Metal Home"	3:25
2.	"Autonomous Lethality"	5:20

Side two
No.	Title	Length
1.	"Interceptor" (Miles Ramen Reshape)	6:16
2.	"Interceptor"	5:10

== Personnel ==
Adapted from the Apophis liner notes.

Black Rain

- Stuart Argabright – instruments, production, mixing, painting

Shapednoise

- Nino Pedone – instruments, production, mixing

Additional performers

- Miles Whittaker – remix (B1)

Production and design

- Pasquale Ascione – design
- Matt Colton – mastering

== Release history ==
Region	Date	Label	Format	Catalog
Germany	2015	Cosmo Rhythmatic	DL, LP	CR02
