= Taking Snapshots =

Studio album by Luc van Acker
- Released: 1982
- Studio: Luc Van Acker's Bedroom (Tienen, Belgium)
- Genre: Synth-pop; experimental
- Length: 38:15

Luc van Acker chronology
Taking Snapshots (1982)	Luc Van Acker (1982)

Alternative cover
- 1994 reissue

Alternative cover
- 1996 reissue

Taking Snapshots (or Taking Snapshots Vol. 1) is the debut studio album of Luc van Acker, self-released in 1982. The album was reissued on CD by Hard Records in 1994 and Fifth Colvmn Records on May 16, 1995. In 2009 the album was reissued for the first time since its release on vinyl record by Kindred Spirits.

== Music ==
The album was recorded and mixed by van Acker at the age of eighteen on a TASCAM 244 cassette recorder in his bedroom. The music was inspired by the calligraphy of Buddhist monks and each track recorded in a single tack.

== Reception ==
Professional ratings
Review scores
Source	Rating
AllMusic	4.5/5 stars

Sonic Boom compared the music to Kraftwerk or Cabaret Voltaire and said "Luc van Acker was truly a man ahead of his time and it is a shame that his music did not see a wide spread release at the time it was written."

== Track listing ==
All music is composed by Robert Salchak.

Side one
No.	Title	Length
1.	"Introduction Fanfara"	1:49
2.	"Moments During Lifetime"	0:39
3.	"Taking Life Serious"	2:48
4.	"Try to Say Something"	3:34
5.	"Fanfara"	1:17
6.	"Find a Way"	3:10
7.	"China"	0:54
8.	"Vision One"	1:40
9.	"Freezing"	2:05
10.	"African Medicin Man"	1:13

Side two
No.	Title	Length
1.	"It's a Day Change"	2:24
2.	"Frozen Tears"	2:52
3.	"Forced Into Light"	2:44
4.	"Take Her Away"	1:14
5.	"Vision Two"	1:39
6.	"What's Downtown"	2:27
7.	"Business"	2:50
8.	"Outro Fanfara"	2:55

== Personnel ==
Adapted from the Taking Snapshots liner notes.

Musicians

- Luc van Acker – instruments, recording, mixing, photography

Production and design

- After Hours (1996 reissue) – design
- Zalman Fishman (1996 reissue) – executive-production
- Jimmy Machon (1994 reissue) – art direction, design

== Release history ==
Region	Date	Label	Format	Catalog
Belgium	1982		LP	ZAS 001
Denmark	1994	Hard	CD	HARDEST 13
United States	1995	Fifth Colvmn	CD	9868-63190
Netherlands	2009	Kindred Spirits	LP	KSE-01
