= The Enemy Within (album) =

Studio album by Sphere Lazza
- Released: September 12, 1995
- Studios: Mirror Image (Gainesville, Florida)
- Genres: Electronic; industrial
- Length: 52:46
- Label: Cleopatra
- Producers: Tony Spaz; David Trousdale

Sphere Lazza chronology
Incinerate (1995)	The Enemy Within (1995)	Ultimate Abyss (2005)

The Enemy Within is the debut studio album by Sphere Lazza, released on September 12, 1995 by Cleopatra Records. The intended to follow their debut with a second album, tentatively titled Paradigm Shift, but the band's insterests were diverted elsewhere and the project never came to fruition.

== Music ==
The track "Morphius" had previously been released on the 1994 various artists compilation The Art of Brutality by Arts Industria.

== Reception ==
Aiding & Abetting praised the gothic composition of The Enemy Within and said "Sphere Lazza write catchy songs with just the right amount of bouncy bass to keep things moving along." Industrialnation commended the band's new melodic musical direction and claimed the album "finally sees the realization of the sound Sphere Lazza had obviously been striving for in the past: a perfect balance between electronic aggression, and tuneful hooks.

== Track listing ==
All tracks are written by Tony Spaz and David Trousdale.

No.	Title	Length
1.	"Iconoclast"	4:02
2.	"Inside Your Universe"	5:07
3.	"Saturated * Guitar parts written by Alexander LaFrantz"	5:43
4.	"Friend or Foe"	4:08
5.	"Inner Sanctum"	3:50
6.	"Petrified"	4:24
7.	"Arizona Nuclear Test 1965"	4:32
8.	"Morpheus"	4:16
9.	"The Camera Eye"	4:41
10.	"Run the Gauntlet"	4:27
11.	"Blueface * Guitar intro provided by Alexander LaFrantz"	4:25
12.	"Where Do We Go From Here?"	3:11

== Personnel ==
Adapted from the liner notes of The Enemy Within.

Sphere Lazza

- Tony Spaz – instruments, production, recording (1, 2, 4–7, 9, 11, 12)
- David Trousdale – vocals, instruments, production, recording (1, 2, 4–7, 9, 11, 12)

Additional performers

- Alex Lafrantz – guitar (3, 11)

Production and design

- Ken Holewczynski (as Arts Industria) – cover art, illustrations, design
- Dana Cornock – remastering

== Release history ==
Region	Date	Label	Format	Catalog
United States	1995	Cleopatra	CD	CLEO 9569
