= Sweet Sub/Mission Vol. 1 =

Compilation album by Various artists
- Released: November 26, 1996
- Genre: Electro-industrial
- Length: 56:03
- Label: Fifth Colvmn

Fifth Colvmn Records chronology
We're All Frankies (1996)	Sweet Sub/Mission Vol. 1 (1996)	World War Underground (1997)

Sweet Sub/Mission Vol. 1 is a various artists compilation album released on November 26, 1996, by Fifth Colvmn Records.

== Reception ==
In their review of Sweet Sub/Mission Vol. 1, Aiding & Abetting said "the 11 tracks present a good picture of the electronic madness Sub/Mission is known for" and that "the main attraction is a KMFDM remix of the Swamp Terrorists' "Dive-Right Jab". But the rest of this compilation features tracks from stuff the FCR has licensed from Sub/Mission: Meathead, Templebeat, Cold, L.I.N. and Circus of Pain." Sonic Boom called the album "a decent compilation from the up and coming label Sub/Mission" but criticized the bands' use of previously available material.

== Track listing ==
No.	Title	Writer(s)	Artist	Length
1.	"Dive-Right Jab" ('Til You Drop KMFDM Remix)	Michael Antener; Ane Hebeisen	Swamp Terrorists	4:21
2.	"Rebel Shade" (Rough Edit)	Antener; Hebeisen	Swamp Terrorists	3:48
3.	"Gravida"	Mauro Teho Teardo	Meathead	5:28
4.	"Drone"	Teardo	Meathead	3:59
5.	"You Spin Me Round"	Michele Benetello; Paolo Favati; Rudy Dalla Mora; Giorgio Ricci; Pietro Zanetti	Templebeat	3:45
6.	"Fucking Mosquito" (Demo Version)	Benetello; Favati; Mora; Ricci; Zanetti	Templebeat	6:00
7.	"Disgregation"	Ilario Cellon; Davide Destro; Angelo Irrequieto	Cold	3:53
8.	"Lull" (In-Edit)	Cellon; Destro; Irrequieto	Cold	3:54
9.	"00 Mind"	Davide Balbo	L.I.N.	5:01
10.	"Jessica's Crime"	Balbo	L.I.N.	4:38
11.	"Remove My Skin" (Paolo F. Remix)	Antener; G.No; Hebeisen	Circus of Pain	4:31
12.	"Untitled"		Unknown Artist	3:55
13.	"Untitled"		Unknown Artist	2:50

== Personnel ==
Adapted from the Sweet Sub/Mission Vol. 1 liner notes.

- Zalman Fishman – executive-producer

== Release history ==
Region	Date	Label	Format	Catalog
Belgium	1996	Sub/Mission/SPV GmbH	CD	cdWHIP025, spv055-123102
United States	1996	Fifth Colvmn	CD	9868-63240
