= Immortal Collection 1983–1995 =

Immortal Collection 1983-1995

Compilation album by Signal Aout 42
- Released: 1995
- Genre: EBM; new beat
- Length: 68:17
- Label: Out of Line
- Producer: Bruno Van Garsse; Michel Nachtergaele

Signal Aout 42 chronology
Conviction (1993)	Immortal Collection 1983-1995 (1995)	Transformation (2007)

Immortal Collection 1983–1995 is a compilation album by Signal Aout 42, released in 1995 by Out of Line.

== Reception ==
Aiding & Abetting recommended the anthology to listeners of The Sisters of Mercy and said "Seriously overdramatic techno collection" and "with obvious goth overtones melded into a hard techno groove (like a moodier FLA at times), Signal Aout 42 does much better when it focuses on music and doesn't whip out vocals." A critic at babysue commended the album and said "sounds nice, and is a bit poppier than you might think." Sonic Boom said "creative use of vocal samples and the lack of many keyboard presets are enough to keep this album from being too boring" and "the older material uses more strings and has a trance feel to it while the newer material is more percussion based and is better suited for club play."

== Track listing ==
All tracks are written by Bruno Van Garsse, Jacky Meurisse and Michel Nachtergaele

No.	Title	Album (date)	Length
1.	"Overture: Fatal Attraction"		4:12
2.	"Behind the Line"		4:15
3.	"Waterdome" (Interlude LP version)		1:48
4.	"Dead Is Calling" (Remix)	Contrast	3:18
5.	"Why Not" (Original LP version)	Pro Patria (1988)	3:34
6.	"To Talk Nonsense" (Original LP version)	Contrast	4:37
7.	"Pro Patria" (Original LP version)	Pro Patria (1988)	3:30
8.	"Try to Survive"		3:51
9.	"You Are" (Original LP version)	Pro Patria (1988)	4:08
10.	"Shadow Man" (Original LP version)	Conviction	4:50
11.	"Don't Remember"		4:10
12.	"To Paint" (Original LP version)	Contrast	4:36
13.	"Carnaval" (Original LP version)	Pro Patria (1988)	5:16
14.	"Everybody Loves You" (Original LP version)	Conviction (1993)	3:46
15.	"In the Name of..."	Conviction (1993)	4:23
16.	"Pleasure and Crime" (Remix)	Pleasure and Crime (1988)	8:02 8:02

== Personnel ==
Adapted from the Immortal Collection 1983-1995 liner notes.

Signal Aout 42

- Bruno Van Garsse – producer
- Jacky Meurisse – executive-production, recording
- Michel Nachtergaele – producer

Production and design

- M.D.D.V. – design

== Release history ==
Region	Date	Label	Format	Catalog
Germany	1995	Out of Line	CD	OUT 001, SPV CD 085-37872
United States	1996	Fifth Colvmn	CD	9868-63216
Canada	1996	Factoria	CS	
