= Fatal Ignorance =

EP by Sphere Lazza
- Released: 1993
- Genre: EBM; industrial
- Label: Majestic
- Producer: Tony Spaz; David Trousdale

Sphere Lazza chronology
Fatal Ignorance (1993)	Cyberchrist (1993)

Fatal Ignorance is an EP by Sphere Lazza, released in 1993 by Majestic Records.

== Track listing ==
All tracks are written by Tony Spaz and David Trousdale.

Side one
No.	Title	Length
1.	"Fatal Ignorance"
2.	"Killing Ground"

Side two
No.	Title	Length
1.	"Inside Your Universe"
2.	"Final Warning"

== Personnel ==
Adapted from the Fatal Ignorance liner notes.

Sphere Lazza

- Tony Spaz – instruments
- David Trousdale – vocals, instruments

== Release history ==
Region	Date	Label	Format	Catalog
United States	1993	Majestic	CS	MR-9302 0136
