= Max M Corporation =

Studio album by Max M
- Released: January 1, 1994
- Genre: Electro; industrial
- Length: 51:42
- Label: Hard
- Producer: Max Møller Rasmussen

Max M chronology
Technology Is God (1992)	Max M Corporation (1994)

Alternative cover
- Fifth Colvmn Records reissue cover

Max M Corporation is the second studio album by Max M, released on January 1, 1994 on Hard Records. On April 18, 1995 Fifth Colvmn Records reissued Max M Corporation with alternate cover art.

== Music ==
The compositions of Max M Corporation are intended to share the mood generated by the graphic novel contained on the album's multimedia CD-ROM. Both CD issues contain the novel and can be accessed using a IBM PC compatible computer. The compositions "A Day on the Net" and "The Rookie SpaceCadet" were respectively released on 1995's Electro Industrial Assassins and 1996's Hard Target: A Collection of Electronic and Industrial Music From Hard Records, both various artists compilations by Cleopatra Records.

== Reception ==
Sonic Boom criticized the combination of genres on Max M Corporation, saying "while the music remains dedicated to the genre it is so widely varied in quality at times it makes the album practically unlistenable" and noted that it would have benefited composer Max Møller Rasmussen to shift away from his Clock DVA influences.

== Track listing ==
All tracks are written by Max Møller Rasmussen

Side one
No.	Title	Length
1.	"TeleDildonics"	3:39
2.	"CyberWorld No. 2"	4:11
3.	"A Day on the Net"	3:39
4.	"Four Hundred Years a Bumm"	3:47
5.	"The Rookie SpaceCadet"	4:19
6.	"CyberChrist"	3:24
7.	"21'st Century Demons"	3:48
8.	"Version X"	6:42
9.	"Survivors at L5"	3:04
10.	"Labeled as a Part"	3:46
11.	"The Future (Symphony): (I) "Look to"; (II) "Shape..."	11:23

== Personnel ==
Adapted from the Max M Corporation liner notes.

Max M

- Max Møller Rasmussen – vocals, instruments, producer

Production and design

- After Hours – design

== Release history ==
Region	Date	Label	Format	Catalog
United States	1994	Hard	CD	HARDEST 11
United States	1995	Fifth Colvmn	CD	9868-63184
