= Death Ride 69 =

American band

- Origin: Los Angeles, California, U.S.
- Genres: Deathrock, gothic rock, industrial rock
- Years active: 1987–1996
- Labels: Fifth Colvmn, Little Sister
- Past members: Mark Blasquez; Buc Bono; Don Diego; Dave Haas; Ethan Port; Linda LeSabre; Wrex Mock; George Sarah; Doran Shelley

Death Ride 69 was an American deathrock band formed in Los Angeles and led by Linda LeSabre (Beatmistress). The original incarnation was a duo consisting of guitarist Don Diego and vocalist Linda LeSabre. The band also featured contributions from Mark Blasquez, Ethan Port, Wrex Mock, Dave Haas and Buc Bono. They released two full-length albums, Death Ride 69 produced by Scott Arundale in 1988 and Screaming Down the Gravity Well in 1996.

== History ==
Death Ride 69 was originally conceived in late 1987 by bass-drum duo Linda LeSabre and Don Diego out of Los Angeles, California. They were later joined by guitarist Wrex Mock and recorded their self-titled debut album in 1988, which contained all the tracks from their Elvis Christ EP. LeSabre reformed the band as a trio with Ethan Port, formerly of Savage Republic and Buc Bono and issued another EP titled Red Sea in 1989.

The band went on hiatus in the early nineties and reformed as a duo with Mark Blasquez joining LeSabre. They were signed to Fifth Colvmn Records and issued their second full-length album Screaming Down the Gravity Well in 1996. Marco Gariboldi of Fabryka called the album "a crescendo of harsh guitars, distortions and hammering drums directed by the high and charismatic voice of Linda" and "a very good album by an underrated and forgotten band."

== Discography ==
Studio albums

- Death Ride 69 (Little Sister Records, 1988)
- Screaming Down the Gravity Well (Fifth Colvmn, 1996)

EPs

- Elvis Christ (Little Sister, 1988)
- Red Sea (Little Sister, 1989)
