= Bloody Tourist =

Studio album by Shinjuku Thief
- Released: 1992
- Recorded: July 1991–December 1991
- Genre: Ambient, dark ambient
- Length: 53:55
- Label: Extreme
- Producer: Paul Schütze, Shinjuku Thief

Shinjuku Thief chronology
Bloody Tourist (1992)	The Scribbler (1992)

Professional ratings
Review scores
Source	Rating
Allmusic	4.5/5 stars

Bloody Tourist is the debut album by Shinjuku Thief, released in 1992 through Extreme Records.

== Track listing ==
No.	Title	Music	Length
1.	"Komachi Ruins"	Mark Stafford, Charles Tétaz, François Tétaz, Darrin Verhagen	4:15
2.	"Feather Woman of the Jungle"	François Tétaz	5:15
3.	"Burden of Dreams"	Darrin Verhagen	3:27
4.	"The Sacrifice"	Darrin Verhagen	6:10
5.	"Preacher's Ghost"	Charles Tétaz	4:29
6.	"Hallucinations"	Darrin Verhagen	3:18
7.	"Open Wound"	Darrin Verhagen	9:51
8.	"Nkoma"	François Tétaz, Darrin Verhagen	4:02
9.	"The Year of Silence"	François Tétaz	3:43
10.	"Graven Image" (Remix)	François Tétaz, Darrin Verhagen	4:51
11.	"Ba-Benzele II"	Darrin Verhagen	4:32

== Personnel ==
Shinjuku Thief

- Charles Tétaz
- François Tétaz
- Darrin Verhagen

Production and additional personnel

- David Brown – shakuhachi
- Jeremy Duff – bass guitar on "Komachi Ruins", "Feather Woman of the Jungle" and "Nkoma"
- Andrew Entsch – acoustic bass guitar on "The Sacrifice"
- Jim Glasson – tenor saxophone on "Feather Woman of the Jungle"
- Richard Grant – photography, design
- Garry Havrillay – mastering
- Made Midri – vocals on "Open Wound"
- Paul Schütze – production
- Mark Stafford – guitar on "Komachi Ruins", "The Sacrifice" and "Graven Image"
- Christopher Steller – programming on "Burden of Dreams"
- Shinjuku Thief – production
- David Yammouni – vocals on "Graven Image"
