= Incinerate (Sphere Lazza album) =

Compilation album by Sphere Lazza
- Released: July 25, 1995
- Genre: Electronic; industrial
- Length: 44:04
- Label: Fifth Colvmn
- Producer: Tony Spaz; David Trousdale

Sphere Lazza chronology
+incinerate (1994)	Incinerate (1995)	The Enemy Within (1995)

Incinerate is a compilation album by Sphere Lazza, released on July 25, 1995 by Fifth Colvmn Records.

== Music ==
Incinerate packages new material with tracks from the band's previous two releases. The composition "LD50" was formerly released on the 1993 Let Them Eat Pastas ! Let Them Eat Shit ! compilation in 1993 and was again released on the 1995 compilations Mind/Body Compilation Volume 2 and The Best of Mind/Body: Electro-Industrial Music From the Internet by Atomic Novelties and Fifth Colvmn Records.

== Reception ==
Sonic Boom Strong credited "Justified?" and "Under Pressure" and said the "programming and caustic dance rhythms are a constant throughout the album." Industrialnation noted "LD50" as a highlight of the collection but said "the album in general seems to be a little forced and over-worked" and "tries to have a driving rhythm, but the percussion is remarkably cheesy for such distorted vocals and harsh synth basses."

== Track listing ==
All tracks are written by Tony Spaz and David Trousdale.

No.	Title	Album (date)	Length
1.	"Under Pressure"	Cyberchrist (1993)	4:26
2.	"Justified?"	Cyberchrist (1993)	3:19
3.	"Kiss the Serpent"	+incinerate (1994)	4:45
4.	"Victim of the Flesh"	Cyberchrist (1993)	5:03
5.	"Cyberchrist"	Cyberchrist (1993)	3:07
6.	"Mortal Wounds"	Cyberchrist (1993)	5:05
7.	"Deadlock"	+incinerate (1994)	3:13
8.	"LD50"	Let Them Eat Pastas ! Let Them Eat Shit ! (1993)	2:32
9.	"Empty V"	+incinerate (1994)	4:15
10.	"Damned Nations"	Cyberchrist (1993)	2:10
11.	"MK Ultra"	+incinerate (1994)	6:09
Total length:			44:04

== Personnel ==
Adapted from the Incinerate liner notes.

Sphere Lazza

- Tony Spaz – instruments, production
- David Trousdale – vocals, instruments, production

Production and design

- Arts Industria – cover art, illustrations, design
- Dana Cornock – mastering
- Zalman Fishman – executive-production

== Release history ==
Region	Date	Label	Format	Catalog
United States	1995	Fifth Colvmn	CD	9868-63194
