= Nanarchy (album) =

Studio album by Black Rain
- Released: October 15, 1996
- Studio: Various: Current Sounds; (New York City, New York); Dessau Studio; (New York City, New York); Shimokawa Studio; (New York City, New York); Warp Sound
- Genre: Industrial; ambient
- Length: 55:52
- Label: Fifth Colvmn
- Producer: Stuart Argabright; Shinichi Shimokawa

Black Rain chronology
1.0 (1995)	Nanarchy (1996)	Protoplasm (2013)

Nanarchy is the second studio album by Black Rain, released on October 15, 1996, by Fifth Colvmn Records.

== Reception ==
Aiding & Abetting said "meandering through the experimental electronic universe, Black Rain makes many stops but never really puts down roots." Sonic Boom said the album "is much like its predecessor in that it was written primarily as a soundtrack style album" and "however upon further examination one notices a number of departures from their debut album."

== Track listing ==
All tracks are written by Stuart Argabright and Shinichi Shimokawa, except "Nanarchy" by Paul Cook, Steve Jones, John Lydon and Glen Matlock.

No.	Title	Length
1.	"Xerfem"	4:14
2.	"Night Island 2"	6:59
3.	"Speed and Ice"	3:40
4.	"Trainstop"	3:34
5.	"Alternities"	4:11
6.	"Das Dusenflugzeug"	6:03
7.	"Corpocyte"	7:42
8.	"Return to Night Island"	6:52
9.	"Nextification"	3:37
10.	"Letter Racers"	3:36
11.	"Nanarchy" (Sex Pistols cover)	5:24

== Personnel ==
Adapted from the Nanarchy liner notes.

Black Rain

- Stuart Argabright – instruments, production
- Shinichi Shimokawa – instruments, production

Production and design

- Scott Anthony – recording
- Joseph Bartoldus – recording
- Zalman Fishman – executive-production
- Fred Szymanski – recording

== Release history ==
Region	Date	Label	Format	Catalog
United States	1996	Fifth Colvmn	CD	9868-63241
