= Perceptual Outer Dimensions =

American music project

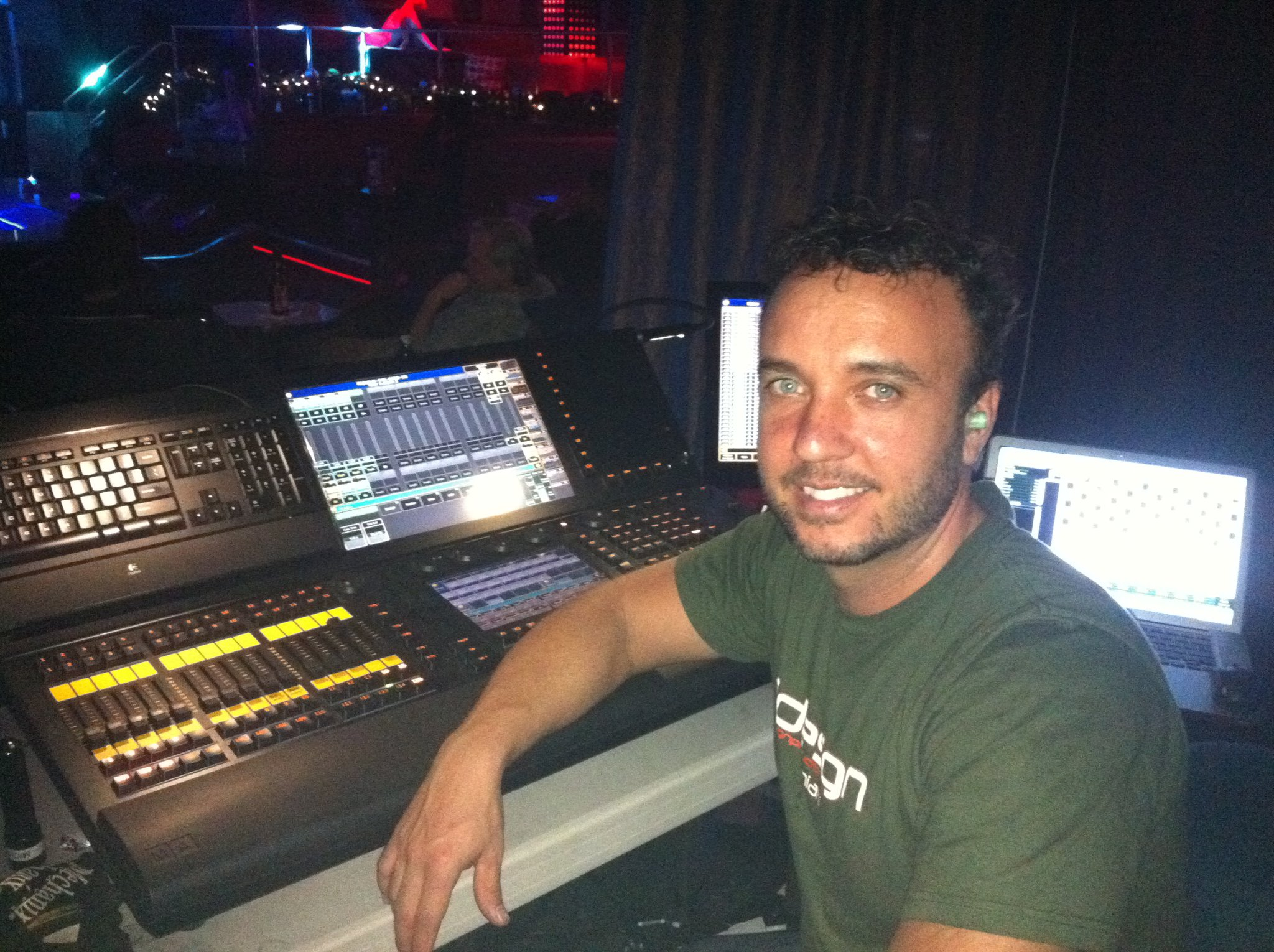
- Holmes Ives in the Sound Booth

Background information
- Origin: Virginia, United States
- Genres: Electronic; downtempo
- Years active: 1994–present
- Labels: Fifth Colvmn, Yoshitoshi, MusicNow, Caffeine, Renaissance, Ministry of Sound, Shinichi, Bedrock, Ova, Six Degrees
- Past members: Holmes Ives
- Website: holmesives.com

Perceptual Outer Dimensions was the music project of Washington, D.C.–based composer Holmes Ives. Under this moniker, Ives released two albums for Fifth Colvmn Records, 1994's The Journey to Planet POD and 1995's Euphonia.

== History ==
Perceptual Outer Dimensions was founded in 1994 out of Virginia as a solo outlet for Ives. He recorded the compositions "Hinge" and "Lurid Dance of the Erimite" and released them on the 1994 Fifth Colvmn Records compilation Frenzied Computer Resonance. Still opting to release with Fifth Colvmn, he debuted a full-length studio album titled The Journey to Planet POD for the label in 1995. Perceptual Outer Dimensions released its second studio album for Fifth Colvmn in 1995 titled Euphonia. The same year the track "De La Luna" was released for the Forced Cranial Removal compilation. He recorded the new composition "Surya" and it was released on Echo in 1996. Afterwards Holmes abandoned his Perceptual Outer Dimensions moniker and continued to release collaborative and "Holmes Ives presents" projects for his own label OVA Records.

In 2003, he remixed "Only Your Love" by Seroya and released on Deep Dish offshoot Shinichi, this remix was then featured on Deep Dish DJ Mix Global Underground 025: Toronto.

In 2005, he released "8 Letters" ft. Avalon Frost single on Shinichi Records, an offshoot of Yoshitoshi Recordings from Washington, DC.

In 2005, he and Sophie Melota released the 10 track album "Untie Me" under the Sophie & Ives moniker.

In 2006, he released his "In Love & Light Vol. 1" album on Ova Records, and collaborated with Jette Kelly on the Jette-Ives album "In The Deep".

In 2009, he had several monikers and collaborative production teams to his credit, which were Jette-Ives, Memnon, Oko Tek, and Perceptual Outer Dimensions.

In 2020, he collaborated with Devika Chawla on the original song "Jeb Se Piya", released on Ova Records. The song "Jab Se Piya" was then remixed by Bombay Dub Orchestra and licensed to the Buddha Bar XXIII (2021) Compilation.

== Discography ==
=== Perceptual Outer Dimensions ===
- The Journey to Planet POD (1994, Fifth Colvmn)
- Euphonia (1995, Fifth Colvmn)

=== Other studio albums ===
- Tetrasomia (2004, OVA Records)
- Satyriasis (2004, OVA Records)
- In Love & Light Vol 1 (2006, OVA Records)
- In Love & Light Vol 2 (2012, OVA Records)
- In Love & Light Vol 3 (2016, OVA Records)
- Pandora (2018, OVA Records)
- Pneuma (2020, Ova Records)
- Once Lost Then Found – Downtempo (2022, OVA Records)
- Once Lost Then Found – Uptempo (2022, OVA Records)
- Rooms with a View (2024, self-released) *Released under his name of Holmes Ives, with Donna Lewis
