= Sphere Lazza =

Electro-industrial band

- Also known as: Klothos
- Origin: Ocala, Florida, United States
- Genres: Electronic
- Years active: 1994–2005
- Labels: Arts Industria; AcidVictim; Cleopatra; Fifth Colvmn; Majestic; Rector
- Past members: Tony Spaz; David Trousdale; Dale Debruyker; Al Kraiker; Alexander LaFrantz

Sphere Lazza were an American electro-industrial based out of Ocala, Florida. The nucleus of the band comprised the musical duo of Tony Spaz and David Trousdale. The band released one studio album titled The Enemy Within in 1995 for Cleopatra Records.

== History ==
In 1990, Tony Spaz was a member of a band named Grinch which split and reformed in 1991 as Sphere of Influence. After some lineup changes, the band became a duo of Spaz and Rick Atkinson and renamed to Sphere Lazza. In October 1992, Atkinson left and was replaced by vocalist Dale Debruyker and percussionist Al Kraiker. The newly formed trio recorded a demo tape entitled "Condition". A year later Kraiker and Debruyker left the band and were soon replaced by David Trousdale, former vocalist of the band Malice Green.

The duo released an EP titled Fatal Ignorance in 1993 for Majestic Records. The song "Justified?" was released on Blood and Computers II: The Return of the Cyberpunks by Paradise Movement and later on Electro Industrial Assassins by Cleopatra Records in 1995. In 1994, the band released their second EP titled Cyberchrist by Reactor Records. "Morphius", a previously unreleased composition, was released on The Art of Brutality by Arts Industria. The band's third EP +incinerate was released on Arts Industria in 1994.

In 1995, Sphere Lazza released the compilation Incinerate on Fifth Colvmn Records. It collected tracks from the band's previous two releases with some new material. "LD50" was formerly released on the 1993 Let Them Eat Pastas ! Let Them Eat Shit ! compilation and was again released on the 1995 compilations Mind/Body Compilation Volume 2 and The Best of Mind/Body: Electro-Industrial Music From the Internet by Atomic Novelties and Fifth Colvmn Records. The band released the composition "Isolation" under the pseudonym Klothos on the Construction No. 009 compilation by Arts Industria.

Cleopatra Records released the Sphere Lazza's debut full-length studio album, titled The Enemy Within the same year as their compilation. Tony Spaz intended to release an album titled Paradigm Shift around after the band's first album but the project was never distributed. The band recorded the new songs "Run the Gauntlet" and "Dirge"- a cover of one of the first punk bands in Ocala, the Plague and respectively released them to the Hard Target: A Collection of Electronic and Industrial Music From Hard Records and Electro-cution compilations by Cleopatra and Arts Industria. Another new composition was released the following year titled "Jesus Played Guitar" on Fifth Colvmn's compilation World War Underground. In 1999, the track "Phi" appeared on the Dissent compilation by Magnetic Resonance. In 2005 the band's third EP Ultimate Abyss was released by AcidVictim Records. A "Dark Horizons" remix of the track "Nemesis" was released on Angelic Hauntings in 2015 by Alvaret Tape.

== Discography ==
Studio albums

- The Enemy Within (1995, Cleopatra)

Extended plays

- Fatal Ignorance (1993, Majestic)
- Cyberchrist (1993, Reactor)
- +incinerate (1994, Arts Industria)
- Ultimate Abyss (2005, AcidVictim)

Compilation albums

- Incinerate (1995, Fifth Colvmn)

Compilation appearances

- Let Them Eat Pastas ! Let Them Eat Shit ! (1993, Spock)
- Transatlantic Techno Trip (1994, Electro Pulse)
- Blood and Computers II: The Return of the Cyberpunks (1994, Paradise Movement)
- The Art of Brutality (1994, Arts Industria)
- Construction No. 009 (1995, Arts Industria)
- Electro Industrial Assassins (1995, Cleopatra)
- Mind/Body Compilation Volume 2 (1996, Arts Industria)
- Sicktone 21/04/1995 (1996, Sicktone)
- The Best of Mind/Body: Electro-Industrial Music From the Internet (1995, Fifth Colvmn)
- Electro-cution (1996, Arts Industria)
- Hard Target: A Collection of Electronic and Industrial Music From Hard Records (1996, Cleopatra)
- World War Underground (1997, Fifth Colvmn)
- Dissent (1999, Magnetic Resonance)
- Angelic Hauntings (2015, Alvaret Tape)
