= Thud (band) =

- Origin: Washington, D.C., United States
- Genres: Death-doom; thrash metal
- Years active: 1990–1993
- Label: Fifth Colvmn
- Past members: Robert Dotolo; Gregg Hudson; Chris Rasley; Adam Rutland

Thud was a death-doom band from Washington, D.C. The band comprised vocalist Robert Dotolo, drummer Gregg Hudson, bassist Chris Rasley and guitarist Adam Rutland, who played a combination of death-doom, stoner and thrash metal. They released the full-length studio album Life & Death and the EP Inevitable in 1992 and 1993 respectively before disbanding.

== History ==
Thud was formed in 1990 by vocalist Robert Dotolo, drummer Gregg Hudson, bassist Chris Rasley and guitarist Adam Rutland in Washington, D.C. The band recorded at Oz Studio in Baltimore and in 1992 released their first studio album Life & Death on Fifth Colvmn Records, marking the label's second release after Chemlab's 1990 EP 10 Ton Pressure. The album was executive-produced by Zalman Fishman and contains guest contributions from vocalist Jared Louche of Chemlab, keyboardist Eli Janney of Girls Against Boys and musician Barrett Jones of Visqueen. Thud re-entered the studio at Uncle Punchy Studios to record music for the Inevitable EP, which was released in 1993 on two 7" vinyls by Fifth Colvmn Records. The album contains two different versions of the song "Score" and remains Thud's final release. Thud performed a series of five shows at 9:30 Club in Washington, D.C. between May 27, 1992 and July 30, 1993.

On April 14, 2015 Thud's song "Ventilator", the lead track of Life & Death, was played on Diane's Kamikaze Fun Machine: Playlist on WMUC-FM. In September 2018, Thud received some airplay again on WMUC-FM when Gary Young of The Drooling Zoomers DJed the songs "Conflict" and "Search" on his scheduled program The Irrelevant Show, which plays classic west-coast songs from the 1990s.

Dotolo died by suicide in 2007.

== Discography ==
Studio albums

- Life & Death (1992, Fifth Colvmn)

EPs

- Inevitable (1993, Fifth Colvmn)
