= Ipecac Loop =

American musical project

- Origin: New York City, New York, United States
- Genres: Electronic; ambient
- Years active: 1995–1998
- Labels: Fifth Colvmn; Armalyte Industries; The Sick City
- Past members: Cameron Lewis
- Website: ipecacloop.com

Ipecac Loop was the music project of American composer Cameron Lewis. Under the moniker Lewis released the album eX for Fifth Colvmn Records.

== History ==
Ipecac Loop was founded in 1994 in New York City as a solo outlet for composer Cameron Lewis. Under his moniker, Lewis released his debut studio album eX on Fifth Colvmn Records in 1995. The compositions "Backbreaker" and "Clusterfuck" were released on the Forced Cranial Removal, Mind/Body Compilation Volume 2 and The Best of Mind/Body: Electro-Industrial Music From the Internet compilations by Fifth Colvmn and Atomic Novelties. Later "Backbreaker" and "Music Box" were later released on Mind/Body Compilation Volume 3 by Atomic Novelties and DIY Productions and Amduscias by Zenflesh, released respectively in 1996 and 1998. In 1996 Lewis released the new composition "Out From Under" on the Fifth Colvmn compilation Echo. Ipecac Loop's debut was remastered and re-released by Forced Evolution Media in 1998.

== Discography ==
Studio albums

- eX (1995, Fifth Colvmn)

Compilation appearances

- Forced Cranial Removal (1995 Fifth Colvmn)
- Mind/Body Compilation Volume 2 (1995, Atomic Novelties)
- The Best of Mind/Body: Electro-Industrial Music From the Internet (1996, Fifth Colvmn)
- Echo (1996, Full Contact)
- Mind/Body Compilation Volume 3 (1996, Atomic Novelties/DIY)
- Amduscias (1998, Zenflesh)
