= Signal Aout 42 =

Belgian electronic music band

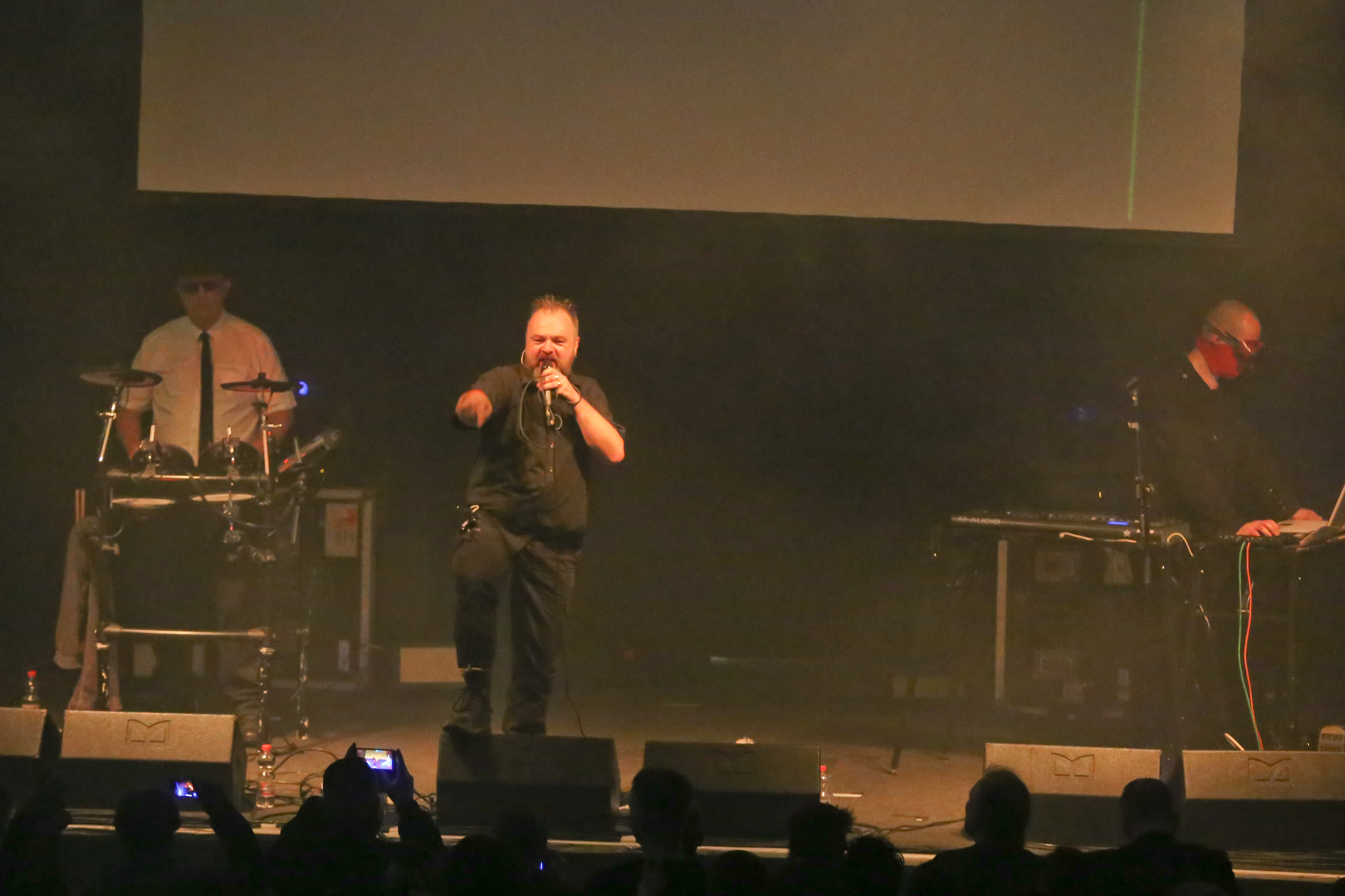
- Wave-Gotik-Treffen 2016

Background information
- Origin: Belgium
- Genres: Electronic body music, techno,
- Years active: 1980–present
- Labels: LD; Alora; Out of Line; Disco Smash; Music Man; SPV
- Members: Jacky Meurisse
- Past members: Damien Vandamme; Luc Vandamme
- Website: signalaout42.wix.com/sa42

Signal Aout 42, also known as SA42, is a Belgian electronic music band. Initially active in the 1980s, Signal Aout 42 became known for producing music in the EBM and industrial styles of electronic music, but into and through the 1990s also incorporated techno, acid, and trance styles. After a decade-long hiatus, the band became active again in the late 2000s.

== History ==
Signal Aout 42 formed in 1981, initially under the name Signal, as an informal live improvisation project of schoolmates Jacky Meurisse, Damien Vandamme, and Luc Vandamme. The group's initial performances consisted of audio-visual collages of industrial noises including chainsaws and metal barrels played to rhythms generated by drum machines and synthetic sound atmospheres using borrowed and non-instruments. Although the techniques and sound of the band's early performances were decidedly industrial in nature, the band drew inspiration from punk and new wave acts including Fad Gadget, Killing Joke, Sex Pistols, Cabaret Voltaire, and DAF.

Due to name conflation with that of a locally famous brand of toothpaste, Signal changed its name to Signal Aout 42 (translated: Signal August '42), a reference to the date when the German Wehrmacht propaganda publication Signal was first released. A cover image from the debut issue was used on posters announcing their concerts. While the name change and association with the propaganda publication led some to believe an association with far-right politics, Meurisse has explicitly stated that this is not the case. In addition to political controversies over the name change, the presence of the number "42" led to accusations of plagiarizing fellow Belgian EBM act Front 242 which, again, Meurisse denied.

By 1985, Meurisse invested in music equipment including a Roland TB-303 Bass Line and a TR-606, which enabled them to create more conventional electronic music compositions. Their earliest tracks in this vein were "Pleasure and Crime" and "Lovely Trees" which were released together as 12″ maxi single on the Disco Smash label. Their follow-up single was "Girls of Vlaanderen", a nod to Meurisse's wife who is of Flemish origin. Initial success of these early singles was followed by the release of the album Pro Patria in 1989.

In 1988 Meurisse became a professional musician and invested in a recording studio located on 22 rue du Fort in Comines. It was here that Meurisse composed the New Beat track "Le Dormeur" for the techno-oriented side project, Pleasure Game, as well as SA42 12″ singles "Submarine Dance", "To Talk Nonsense", "The Right Thing", and "Carnaval".

A second album, Contrast, was released in 1990. At that time Signal Aout 42 was made up of Jacky Meurisse, Damien Vandamme, who gave constructive ideas and compiled visuals for the band; Jean Luc Szekanecz, who took part in songwriting and some live support; and Luc Vandamme, who performed live percussion. From 1990 to 1995, Jacky Meurisse relocated the studio where he worked exclusively for Disco Smash-Blackout Records and wrote several tracks for techno-oriented side projects like Pleasure Game ("Le Dormeur"), Le Park ("Naked"), DJPC, Amnesia ("It's a Dream"), and BORIS while maintaining work for SA42. The third album, Conviction, was released in 1993.

The compilation album Immortal Collection 1983-1995 was released in 1995 by Out of Line Music, the first release of the Berlin-based label. After Conviction there was a hiatus of more than ten years before the release of a fourth album, Transformation, in 2007. Thereafter, Meurisse resumed live performances supported by two members of GrandChaos – Tcheleskov Ivanovich and Olivier T. – including appearances at BimFest in Belgium and at Wave-Gotik-Treffen in Germany. Meurisse and Ivanovich later formed a side project, Grand((0))Signal.

The following years saw new album releases – Vae Victis in 2010, Inspiration in 2013, and Insurrection in 2019 – all of which were released by Out Of Line.

== Discography ==
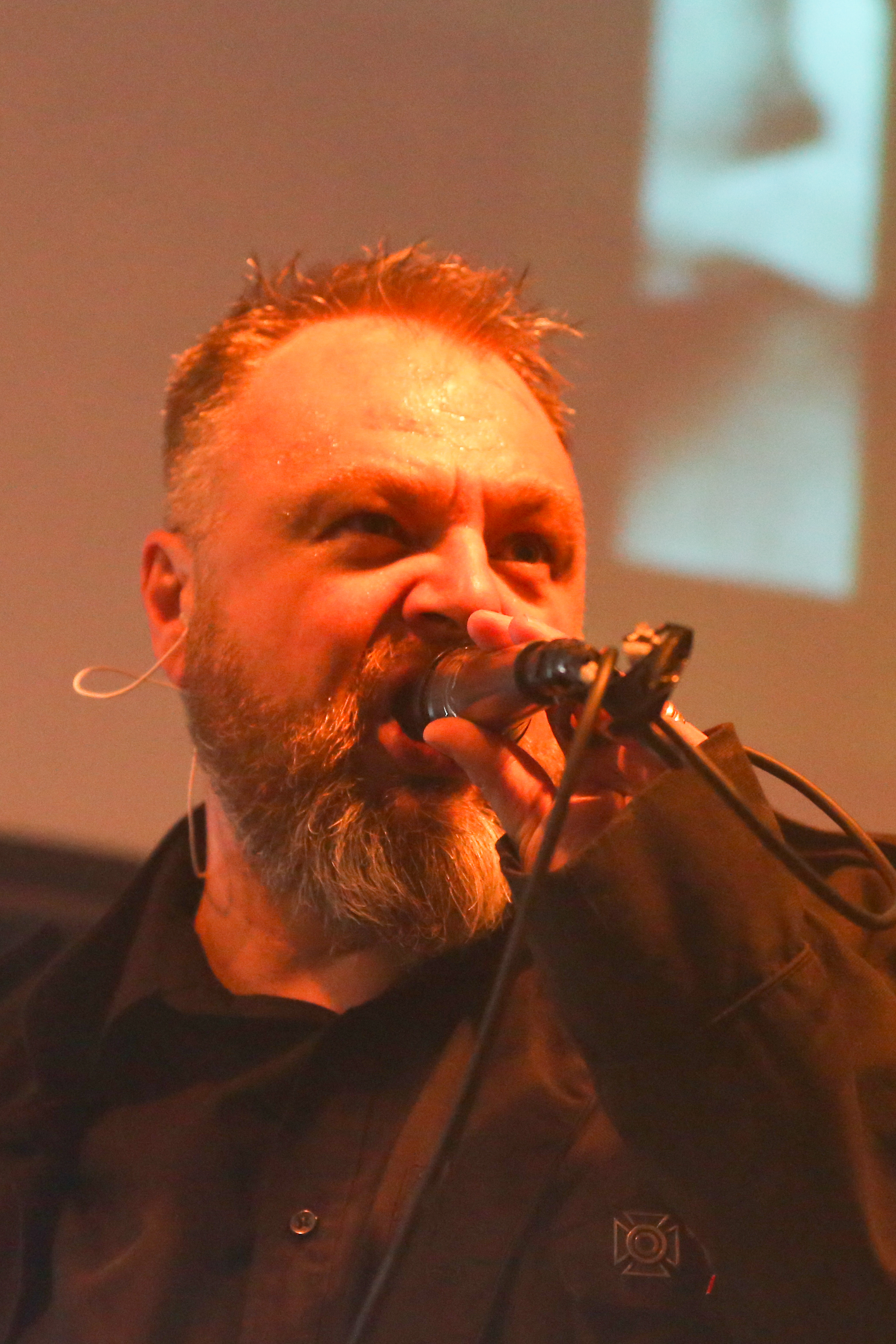
Jacky Meurisse at the Wave-Gotik-Treffen in 2016

Studio albums

1. Pro Patria – 1989
2. Contrast – 1990
3. Conviction – 1993
4. Transformation – 2007
5. Vae Victis – 2010
6. Inspiration – 2013
7. Insurrection – 2019
8. Ex+Voto – 2023

Compilation albums

- Immortal Collection 1983-1995 – 1995

Singles

- "Pleasure And Crime" – 1986
- "Girls of Vlaanderen" – 1986
- "Carnaval" (Acid Mix) – 1988
- "Pleasure and Crime" (Remix) – 1988
- "Submarine Dance" (Remix) – 1989
- "Right Thing" – 1989
- "To Talk Nonsense" – 1990
- "Dead Is Calling" (Remix) – 1990
- "I Want To Push" – 1991
- "Waterdome" – 1992
- "The Last Quest" – 1993
