= Black Rain (band) =

American musical group

- Origin: New York, New York, United States
- Genres: Industrial; techno; ambient
- Years active: 1992–present
- Labels: Blackest Ever Black; Cosmo Rhythmatic; Fifth Colvmn; Heartworm Press; Kombinat; TPOS
- Past members: Stuart Argabright; Chaz Cardoza; Thom Furtado; Alison Lewis; Soren Roi; Shinichi Shimokawa; Dave Vulcan
- Website: blackesteverblack.com

Black Rain were an American electro-industrial group based out of New York City. It was formed in 1992 by musicians Stuart Argabright, Chaz Cardoza, Thom Furtado and Shinichi Shimokawa. They released two studio albums on Fifth Colvmn Records: 1.0 (1995), Nanarchy (1996). The band released their third album Dark Pool on Blackest Ever Black in 2014.

== History ==
Black Rain was formed in New York City by musicians Stuart Argabright, Chaz Cardoza, Thom Furtado and Shinichi Shimokawa. Black Rain released their debut full-length studio album 1.0 on Fifth Colvmn Records in 1995. The following year they released their second album Nanarchy on Fifth Colvmn. In 2014 the band's third album Dark Pool was released by Blackest Ever Black.

== Discography ==
Studio albums

- 1.0 (1995, Fifth Colvmn)
- Nanarchy (1996, Fifth Colvmn)
- Dark Pool (2014, Blackest Ever Black)

Extended plays

- Black Rain (1992, Kombinat)
- Black Rain (1993, TPOS)
- Protoplasm (2013, Blackest Ever Black)
- Computer Soul (2019, Blackest Ever Black)

Split releases

- Apophis (2015, Cosmo Rhythmatic)
- Rebellion Is Over (2015, Heartworm Press)

Compilation albums

- Now I'm Just a Number: Soundtracks 1994-95 (2012, Blackest Ever Black)
- Metal Rain 1989-93 (2018, DKA)

Compilation appearances

- Johnny Mnemonic (Music From the Motion Picture) (1995, Sony)
- Forced Cranial Removal (1995 Fifth Colvmn)
- Colloquium ¹ (1995, Dark Star/Eisenberg)
- Echo (1996, Full Contact)
- World War Underground (1996, Fifth Colvmn)
- Fade to Black Volume 2 (1999, K-Town)
- 100% Black Octavo Volumen (2005, Blanco Y Negro)
- After the Affair: Selected Blackest Ever Black, 2012 (2012, Blackest Ever Black)
- 14 Tracks: Consensual Hallucination (2012, Boomkat)
- 14 Tracks: Night Derive (2014, Boomkat)
- Mind the Gap #117 (2015, Gonzo Circus)
- When You Look on the Bright Side, I Will Sit With You in the Dark (2018, Alvaret Tape)
- Delicacy Spectrum (2020, Eyemyth)
