= James Ray (rock musician) =

Rock singer and musician

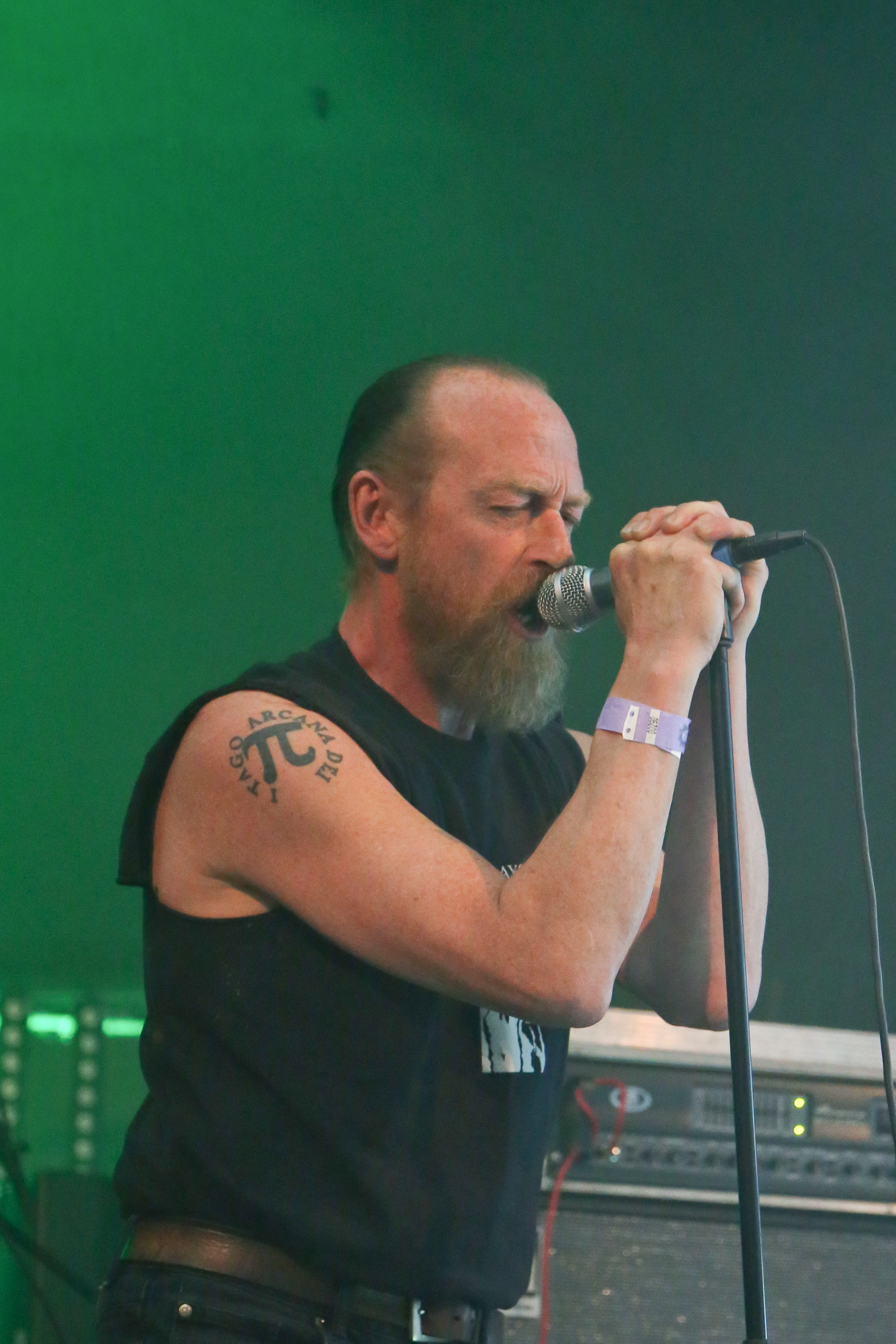
James Ray at the Wave-Gotik-Treffen 2016

James Ray is a rock singer and band-leader, best known as a member of Andrew Eldritch's side-project The Sisterhood and for his own band James Ray's Gangwar.

He was also a founding member of James Ray and The Performance, The MK Ultra, James Ray & The Longfolk, 4080peru and Black Hearted Riders.

== James Ray and The Performance ==
The Performance was founded by James Ray and Carl Harrison. An early demo of the tracks "Mexico Sundown Blues", "Dance" and "Edie Sedgwick" (the latter named after the actress) was sent to The Sisters of Mercy's record label, Merciful Release. Additional demos from the time included a cover of Alex Harvey Band's "Faith Healer" song and a track entitled "PBR Streetgang", recorded in Hamburg, in which the vocals were almost entirely soundbytes from the film "Apocalypse Now", including the song's title.

The band were signed, and after Ray's contribution to The Sisterhood project Gift, the label released the single "Mexico Sundown Blues" in July 1986.

Merciful Release subsequently released the singles "Texas" and "Dust Boat", followed by the compilation album A New Kind of Assassin. Although the band had recorded a song with the same title, it was not featured on the album, although it did appear on Gothic Rock compilations.

The band's final line up included James Ray, Carl Harrison and Richard Harvey for the single release "Dust Boat", which included "A New Kind of Assassin" as its B-side.

== The Sisterhood and The Sisters of Mercy ==
As mentioned previously, James Ray contributed vocals to The Sisterhood's "Gift" EP, which was recorded between The Sisters of Mercy's First and Last and Always and Floodland albums after the departure of Gary Marx (who went off to form Ghostdance), Wayne Hussey and Craig Adams (both of whom went on to form The Mission). Ray and Harrison can also been seen "playing" keyboards during the Sisters' Top of the Pops performances promoting songs from 1987's Floodland.

== James Ray's Gangwar ==
After The Performance, Ray formed James Ray's Gangwar. Ray was still contracted to Merciful Release for one remaining album, so the band recorded Dios Esta De Nuestro Lado, a more aggressive sounding album, still with the southwestern American influence. The album's final track was a cover of Alvin Stardust's "[My] Coo Ca Choo". The opening track, "Rev Rev Lowrider", was released as a single. Further singles "Fuel", "Another Million Dollars" and "Without Conscience" were not included on the album.

After this, Gangwar released Third Generation on Surgery Records. It was an electronic album, with fewer guitars and a more trance-like feel.

The final Gangwar album was Psychodalek, released as a soundtrack to Ray's novella of the same name.

== The MK Ultra ==
After Third Generation, Ray recorded a solo album, This is This, under the moniker The MK Ultra: it was again released on Merciful Release. The musical style was more dance-like than Third Generation, continuing to incorporate samples and Ray's own deep voice against the female backing vocals and electronic rhythms. The first track, "Regeneration", was a remix of the title track from Third Generation. The follow-up album, Beluga Pop, featured ambient electronic pieces, far removed from much of his earlier work. The MK Ultra did not release any singles.

== James Ray & the Longfolk ==
In 2005, Ray teamed up with other musicians to form James Ray & the Longfolk, and recorded the four-track EP Between Those States of Mind. The songs, "Beneath the Tupelo Tree", "Between Those States of Mind", "Nothing At All" and "A Higher Plains Drifter/Last Train from Woody Creek", marked a musical departure from Ray's earlier works, featuring acoustic guitars alongside vocals, keyboards, saxophone and percussion. The EP was self-released with little distribution and is now considered a rarity. The first track includes an audio sample of SNL actor Phil Hartman quoting a famous scripture, with a twist.

== 25men ==
In 2008, 25men released The Dancing Wu Li Masters, an eight-track techno/trance album featuring Ray on vocals.

== Earl Rivers and a Band of Heathens ==
In 2013, a track entitled "Nowhere Left To Go" appeared on YouTube, featuring Ray on vocals. This track also featured James Ray and the Performance guitarist Richard Harvey.

== Black Hearted Riders ==
In March 2015, a new project debuted on SoundCloud.com entitled BLACK HEARTED RIDERS "Northern Lights EP", which features James Ray on vocals. The complete, 11-track CD is available online and is titled "Last Train From Woody Creek" and features Mick Emerson, originally of The Performance. A follow-up CD "Dawn Death Zephyr" will be released in September 2016.

== Present day ==
In recent years, Gangwar have reformed to a handful of concerts, including Wave-Gotik-Treffen.

Ray also formed a multimedia project, 4080 Peru, based around a 45-minute film with accompanying soundtrack of ambient music: Ray has performed these tracks live.

In August 2017, the Black Hearted Riders played the UK's Boomtown festival and are currently booking gigs.

Additionally, in late 2015, two separate CD collections and a live Gangwar CD were released. The collections sets span James Ray's extensive catalogue and feature demos, outtakes, live songs and more, available via Black October Records.
