= Templebeat =

Italian industrial rock/EBM band

- Also known as: Templebeat LTD
- Origin: Italy
- Genres: Industrial rock, electronic body music
- Years active: 1990–2000, 2020–present
- Labels: Sub/Mission; Dynamica; 21st Circuitry
- Spinoffs: Templezone; Metal Music Machine
- Members: Giorgio Ricci; Scar
- Past members: Michele Benetello; Paolo Favati; Pietro Zanetti; Rudy Dalla Mora

Templebeat is an Italian industrial rock/electronic body music band, initially active in the 1990s and reformed as Templebeat LTD in 2020.

== History ==
Templebeat formed in 1990 by Michele Benetello, Pietro Zanetti, and Giorgio Ricci. Co-founder Pietro Zanetti had been an active musician since 1979, playing in punk bands such as Alternative Religion since 1982. The band found a primary inspiration in The KLF who they said were the "maximum expression of punk" but with machines.

One of their earliest appearances was in 1990 on the tape compilation Tribute to PTV powered by T.O.P.Y.TV (Italian semi-official branch of Thee Temple ov Psychic Youth) which contained their hardbeat cover of "Ov Power". In 1991, Templebeat won the Arezzo Wave festival contest, and their song "Fuckin' Mosquito" was subsequently included on the compilation Arezzo Wave 1991, released by Polygram Records. Their set in Arezzo was broadcast by the TV music channel VideoMusic. At the end of 1991 Templebeat issued a three-track 12" EP entitled Auto Da Fe, which sold 1,100 copies in Italy.

The band was signed to Dune Records, the label run by Paolo Favati, who produced their six-track CD single "Wargasm". The track "Einstein On The Beach" from this release received heavy rotation on Videomusic and appeared on MTV's 120 Minutes. The band toured throughout Europe and played larger festivals such as Popkomm.

The band turn down offers from other labels to work on their debut album, Black Suburbia, produced by Favati for Dune. The band joined Pankow on their last tour in 1992/93. Their concert in Prague was filmed and broadcast on MTV's "120 Minutes" with an interview with the band. In November 1993, Dune and Templebeat assigned national and international rights to the band to Audioglobe's Sub/Mission label. Black Suburbia was licensed worldwide to Noise/Machinery Records imprint Dynamica in Berlin and released in June 1994, with an U.S. release following in February 1995.

The relationship with Dynamica continued through 1994, but while the band enjoyed the greater distribution reach of the label, they found the promotional side frustrating and severed the relationship. The band continued forward with Sub/Mission who had already represented the band in Italy.

In 1995-96, the band toured Germany with Sabotage, Dive, and Meathead.

While not overtly political, the band made statements against fascism, and treated on subjects such as the HIV/AIDS epidemic and the war in Bosnia-Herzegovina, sometimes with a conspiratorial stance. Both live and in recorded works, the band is fond of playing covers including "She's Lost Control" by Joy Division, "Der Mussolini" by DAF, "Warm Leatherette" by The Normal, "You Spin Me Round (Like a Record)" by Dead or Alive, and others.

By the year 2000, a collapse in label support and an unwillingness to self-release without it prompted the band's initial lineup to dissolve. Ricci went on to form an IDM and ambient industrial music project called Templezone and joined the band First Black Pope as live support. Zanetti went on to form Metal Music Machine with Rudy Dalla Mora.

In 2010, Silentes Minimal Editions, a sublabel of Silentes, released a retrospective compilation entitled The Grey Space containing songs from an early tape version of Interzone as well as several rare compilation tracks. In 2019, the Spanish Aspecto Humano label re-released the entire Interzone cassette as a limited vinyl release.

In 2011 there was a short-lived attempt at a reunion with the addition of vocalist Scar of the band First Black Pope. In 2020, Ricci revived the band as a duo of himself and Scar under the name Templebeat LTD. The band returned to activity by contributing a remix of the track "Dies Irae" by Italian electronic music band Klonavenus.

== Discography ==
Tapes

- "Ov Power" in Tribute to Ptv (TOPY TV Italy, 1990)
- "Xperience" in Xybernethnix (TOPY TV Italy, 1991)
- "Hide and seek" in From thelematics to telepathics (TOPY TV Italy, 1992)

Discs

- Auto Da Fe 12" (1991)
- Wargasm (EP, 1992)
- Black Suburbia (LP, 1994, Dynamica-under license from Sub/Mission)
- Heidi S. (1994, Dynamica-under license from Sub/Mission)
- Interzone (1994, Dynamica-under license from Sub/Mission)
- Wicked (1995, Sub/Mission)
- Mediasickness (1996, Sub/Mission - licensed to 21st Circuitry for the US only)
- The Grey Space (Compilation, Remastered, 2010, Silentes Minimal Editions sme 1035 )
