= Darrin Verhagen =

- Born: Australia
- Genre: dark ambient
- Occupations: Musician, songwriter, composer, academic
- Instruments: Keyboards, programming, shakuhachi
- Years active: 1992–present
- Label: Extreme
- Website: darrinverhagen.com

Darrin Verhagen is an Australian composer of dark ambient and gothic music. He has recorded under several different monikers, including Shinjuku Thief (adopted from his first band in the 1990s, he has continued to use); other side-projects include using Shinjuku Filth; and Professor Richmann. He founded Dorobo Records in 1992, which operated for 15 years.

He is an assistant professor at RMIT University in Melbourne

== Early life and education ==
Darrin Verhagen was born in Australia.

For his master's degree, he undertook research on "the delicate instability of lowercase sound" for his Masters, and for his PhD, "the brutality of Noise".

== Career ==
Shinjuku Thief was originally an industrial and experimental music group of three musicians based in Melbourne, including Verhagen, François Tétaz, and his brother Charles Tétaz. After Shinjuku Thief's first album Bloody Tourist was released, Verhagen founded Dorobo Records, through which he continued to issue his music. Dorobo Records released music by Australian sound artists for over 15 years.

As of 1998 used the names Shinjuku Thief, Shinjuku Filth, or Professor Richman for his music

Verhagen has composed music for many Australian arts companies and artists (including Chunky Move, Australian Dance Theatre, Lucy Guerin, Malthouse Theatre, Melbourne Theatre Company, and Sydney Theatre Company). He is a founding member of the (((20 Hz))) Collective.

As of August 2026 he is an associate professor at RMIT University in Melbourne, working as a senior lecturer in Design, and running the Audiokinetic Experiments (AkE) Lab.

== Shinjuku Thief ==
Shinjuku Thief is an experimental recording project of Darrin Verhagen, that could be described as dark ambient or gothic industrial. Shinjuku Thief began in 1992 as a trio, consisting of Verhagen, Charles Tétaz and François Tétaz. Eventually, Verhagen became the mainstay. Shinjuku Thief's first LP, Bloody Tourist, was released on the Extreme label. Subsequent LPs were released on Verhagen's own Dorobo label. Verhagen's side-project, Shinjuku Filth, released music in the industrial music genre.

With David Thrussell, Shinjuku Thief released a spoken-word album titled The Call of Cthulhu on 19 June 2026 on Metropolis Records. The album comprises a retelling of H. P. Lovecraft's 1928 short story of the same name.

== Discography ==
Solo

- Soft Ash (1997, Dorobo)

as Shinjuku Thief

- Bloody Tourist (1992, Extreme)
- The Scribbler (1992, Dorobo)
- The Witch Hammer (1993, Dorobo)
- The Witch Hunter (1995, Dorobo)
- The Witch Haven (2002, Dorobo)
- Matte Black (2004, Dorobo)
- Devoltion (2006, Dorobo)
- Boys in the Trees OST (2016, Liberation)

as Shinjuku Filth

- Junk (1995, Dorobo)
- Raised by Wolves (1997, Dorobo)
- Zero/Stung (1999, Dorobo)

as Professor Richmann

- Succulent Blue Sway (1995, Dorobo)
