= Fifth Colvmn Records =

American record label (1990–1997)

- Founded: 1990
- Country of origin: United States
- Location: Washington, D.C.

Fifth Colvmn Records was a record label based in Washington, D.C. The label was founded in 1990 by Zalman Fishman, owner of the nightclub FIFTH COLVMN, located in Washington D.C.

The label's first release was Chemlab's debut EP Ten Ton Pressure. Jared Hendrickson of Chemlab also became the general manager for the label. Chemlab later played several dates with Nine Inch Nails, eventually attracting a distribution deal for their next release, Burn Out at the Hydrogen Bar, with Metal Blade Records.

The band Thud was the next artist to join the label. Heavy, loud and unrelenting, Thud became very popular amongst Metal fans and critics alike luring Eli Janney from Girls Against Boys to contribute to their debut record Life & Death and earning co-headlining performances with Stone Temple Pilots. After the re-release of Ten Ton Pressure with some new songs and remixes the label's release strategy turned more aggressive and sharply focused on growth. In 1994 the label signed a distribution deal with Caroline Records, which covered all releases except Chemlab, who were still governed by their deal with Metal Blade Records. Three new developing artists saw their debut albums released by Fifth Colvmn forming a solid foundation upon which the label could be built. These artists were Haloblack, Acumen (now Acumen Nation) and electronic/ambient project Perceptual Outer Dimensions.

The following year brought growth as the label established itself as the U.S. home for two European Industrial Rock labels; Hard Records and Cyber-tec Records. Cyber-tec Records was exclusive to FCR. Hard Records' agreement with FCR saw the release of two Luc van Acker solo albums as well as the Max M Corporation. Cyber-tec Records' EBM/Industrial Rock was exposed to American audiences through the release of the bands New Mind and a side-project of Jean-Luc DeMeyer of Front 242 entitled the Cyber-tec Project. Other projects that saw release included a dream-pop album from Die Warzau members Jim Marcus and Van Christie with Jane Jensen on vocals, a project from Black Rain that also served as the score to the European version of the film Johnny Mnemonic based on the William Gibson short story of the same name and a voudou/goth-rock project led by Rodney Orpheus of Cassandra Complex. Through its network of musicians and studio techs throughout Chicago, FCR connected with John Elliott of the band Dessau. Originally signed to Carlyle Records, an early industrial-dance label, Dessau's latest demo included guest spots from Paul Barker of Ministry and Richard Patrick formerly of Nine Inch Nails. Along with the Cyber-tec Project, Dessau's "Details Sketchy" release would help buoy the label to its first full year.

1996 saw the label release some very strong follow-up records including the long-awaited "East Side Militia", Chemlab's follow-up to their debut full-length "Burn Out at the Hydrogen Bar" originally released in 1993. In addition to Chemlab, Acumen released "Territory = Universe" a follow-up to "Transmissions from Eville" and Haloblack released "funkyhell" following their debut entitled "Tension Filter". There were new artists joining the fold in this year as well. Death Ride 69, a project involving members of My Life with the Thrill Kill Kult, Trust Obey a creation from John Bergin, a co-creator of The Crow comic book and James Ray, a contemporary of Andrew Eldritch's from the Sisters of Mercy who re-issued a selection of his collaborations with Eldritch, all released debut records on FCR in 1996. Also new to the FCR fold was Final Cut. At one point Final Cut called Nettwerk Records home and regularly toured with My Life With The Thrill Kill Kult. "Atonement" was released by Final Cut on FCR in the Fall of 1996 and helped build the label's credibility amongst musicians.

While trying to build upon a shaky distribution deal, the label entered 1997 supporting Chemlab on tour with art-metal visionaries Gwar and a selection of artists including The Shining, artists from the Italian label sub/mission and an assortment of electronic, drum and bass and dance records on the Full-Contact Records imprint.

Following an investigation for tax evasion, the Fifth Column nightclub closed in 1996. Although a separate entity, the label eventually suffered as well and ceased operation in 1997.

This label is not to be confused by the similarly titled, but unrelated, hip hop record company called Fifth Column Records, which was founded in 2015.

== Discography ==
- Fifth Colvmn Records discography

== See also ==
- List of record labels

== Notable artists ==
- Chemlab
- Acumen
- Black Lung
- Black Rain
- Crisis-N.T.I.
- Cyber-tec Project
- Death Ride 69
- Dessau
- D!v!s!on No. 9
- Electro Assassin
- Ether Bunny
- Final Cut
- Gravy
- Haloblack
- H3llb3nt
- Insight 23
- Ipecac Loop
- Max M Corporation
- Meathead
- New Mind
- Oxygiene 23
- Peach of Immortality
- Perceptual Outer Dimensions
- James Ray
- The Shining
- Shinjuku Filth
- Signal Aout 42
- Sphere Lazza
- Sun God
- T.H.C.
- Thud
- To Live and Shave in L.A.
- Trust Obey
- Vampire Rodents
- Luc van Acker
- ZIA
