= Dooms =

Dooms may refer to:

- Dooms, Virginia, census-designated place in Augusta County, Virginia, United States.
- Harry Dooms (1867–1899), nicknamed "Jack", Major League Baseball outfielder
- Jan Gaspar Dooms (1597–1675), Flemish draftsman and copperplate engraver active in Prague.

== See also ==
- Doom (disambiguation)
- Doomed (disambiguation)
- Doomsday (disambiguation)
