= Doom =

Doom is another name for damnation.

Doom may also refer to:

== People ==
- Doom (professional wrestling), the tag team of Ron Simmons and Butch Reed
- Daniel Doom (1934–2020), Belgian cyclist
- Debbie Doom (born 1963), American softball pitcher
- Lorna Doom (1958–2019), the bassist for American punk-rock band Germs
- MF Doom (1971–2020), hip-hop musician and producer
- Omar Doom (born 1976), American actor, musician and artist
- Alexander Doom (born 1997), Belgian sprinter

== Places ==
- Doom Bar, Camel Estuary, Cornwall, UK
- Doom Island, in Sorong, Southwest Papua, Indonesia
- Doom Mons, a mountain range and peak on Titan, Saturn's moon
- Doom Mountain, on Vancouver Island, British Columbia, Canada

== Arts, entertainment, and media ==
=== Entertainment franchise ===
- Doom (franchise), a series of first-person shooter video games and spin-off media, created by id Software
  - Doom (1993 video game), the first installment
  - Doom (2016 video game), the fifth installment
  - Doom engine, which powers Doom games and others
- Doom (novel series), a series of books based on the first two video games, by Dafydd ab Hugh and Brad Linaweaver
- Doom: The Boardgame, a board game adaptation of the video games

=== Films ===
- The Doom, a 1976 Romanian film by Sergiu Nicolaescu
- Doom (film), 2005, based on the video game series
- Doom: Annihilation 2019, reboot based on the video game series
- Justice League: Doom, a 2012 animated film from DC Entertainment

=== Fictional entities ===
- Doctor Doom, a Marvel Comics character
  - Cynthia Von Doom, a Marvel Comics character - mother of the character Doctor Doom
- Judge Doom, a character from the 1988 film, Who Framed Roger Rabbit
- Black Doom (Sonic the Hedgehog), a character
- Mount Doom, a fictional volcano in J.R.R. Tolkien's The Lord of the Rings
- Thulsa Doom, a character from Robert E. Howard's Conan the Barbarian
- Valeria Von Doom, a Marvel Comics character
- Doomguy, protagonist of the DOOM game series

=== Music ===
==== Albums and EPs ====
- Doom (album), a 1997 hip-hop album by Mood
- Doom (EP), a 2005 death metal EP by Job for a Cowboy

==== Bands ====
- Doom (British band), a hardcore punk band
- Doom (Japanese band), a heavy metal band

==== Genres ====
- Doom metal, a style of heavy metal music
- Dark wave, a style of music also known as doom or doom wave

==== Songs ====
- "Doom", a song by Blind Guardian from the album Nightfall in Middle-Earth, 1998
- "Doom", a song by Deerhoof from the album La Isla Bonita, 2014
- "Doom", a song by Dilly Dally from the album Heaven, 2018
- "Doom", a song by the Hiatus from the album Anomaly, 2010
- "Doom", a song by the Hidden Cameras from the album Age, 2014
- "Doom", a song by Juice Wrld from the album Fighting Demons, 2021
- "Doom", a song by Ron Carter from the album Uptown Conversation, 1970
- "Doom", a song by Rotten Sound from the album Murderworks, 2002
- "Doom", a song by Swamp Terrorists from the EP Wreck, 1996
- "Doom #2", a song by Yob from the album The Illusion of Motion, 2004

=== Other uses in arts, entertainment, and media ===
- Doom paintings, a traditional painting that depicts the Last Judgment
- DOOM Inc, an American film production company
- Doom (book), 2021, by Niall Ferguson

== See also ==
- Dhoom (disambiguation)
- Doom9, a technology website
- "Doom and Gloom"
- Doomed (disambiguation)
- Doomsday (disambiguation)
- Dr. Doom (disambiguation)
- Legion of Doom (disambiguation)
- Sense of impending doom
