= Legion of the Doomed =

Legion of the Doomed may refer to:

- another nickname of The Writing 69th, a group of journalists who flew on World War II bombing missions
- Legion of the Doomed (film), a 1958 adventure film

== See also ==
- Legion of Doom (disambiguation)
