= Killer (Swamp Terrorists album) =

Studio album by Swamp Terrorists
- Released: March 25, 1996
- Studio: Combat Shock Studio (Bern, CH)
- Genre: Industrial rock, industrial metal
- Length: 47:48
- Label: Cyberware Productions

Swamp Terrorists chronology
Dive-Right Jab: The Remixes (1995)	Killer (1996)	Wreck (1996)

Killer is the fourth and final studio album by Swamp Terrorists, released on March 25, 1996 by Cyberware Productions. The band expanded their membership during the recording sessions with the inclusion of bassist Andrej A., percussionist Piet H. and guitarist Spring.

== Reception ==
A critic for Sonic Boom described Killer as being the band's most consistent album since Grow – Speed – Injection, saying "instead of focusing on a handful of filler tracks and remixes as in the past, the majority of the album consists of full length original songs, thereby choosing to relegate the fluff to a more appropriate remix album. Despite criticizing Swamp Terrorists for not growing musically Sonic Boom gave the album a positive review, noting that "the same zany lyrical style and freaked out power guitar chords are still present along with more than their fair share of pulsating dance electronics which seem to keep the Swampies a favorite in clubs."

== Track listing ==
All tracks are written by Michael Antener and Ane Hebeisen, except "Dicksmoker" by Teho Teardo

No.	Title	Length
1.	"Rock Dead"	1:09
2.	"Dive-Right Jab"	4:03
3.	"Shape of Rage"	3:54
4.	"Wreck"	4:59
5.	"Dicksmoker" (Meathead cover)	3:43
6.	"Vivid Cell"	4:57
7.	"Weapon Killer"	2:35
8.	"Get O."	4:00
9.	"Try Me"	4:28
10.	"Doubting Idol"	4:29
11.	"Blast It"	4:29
12.	"Full Killer"	5:01

== Personnel ==
Adapted from the Killer liner notes.

Swamp Terrorists

- Andrej A. – bass guitar
- Michael Antener (as STR) – sampler
- Piet H. – drum programming
- Ane Hebeisen (as Ane H.) – lead vocals, cover art, illustrations, photography
- Spring – guitar

Additional musicians

- Mike Belac – guitar (6)
- DJ Dave – scratching (3)
- Dan Schilliger – guitar (9)

Production and design

- Bern – recording, mixing
- Glenn Miller – mastering
- FM – typesetting
- Stögu – typesetting

== Release history ==
Region	Date	Label	Format	Catalog
1996	Czech Republic	Nextera	CD	ERA 9602
1996	Finland	Cyberware Productions	CD	NET 013
1996	Italy	Sub/Mission	CD	WHIP012
1996	Japan	Gift	CD	GFT-04
1996	Switzerland	No Limit	CD	900382
1996	United States	Metropolis	CD	MET 016
