= Dhoomam =

Dhoomam may refer to these Indian films:

- Dhoomam (1985 film)
- Dhoomam (2023 film)

== See also ==
- Dhoom (disambiguation)
