= Pieter de Jode =

Pieter de Jode may refer to:

- Pieter de Jode I
- Pieter de Jode II
