= Grim – Stroke – Disease =

Studio album by Swamp Terrorists
- Released: February 1991
- Studio: Factory Studio (Verona, ITL)
- Genre: Industrial
- Length: 56:15
- Label: Machinery
- Producer: Michael Antener; Ane Hebeisen

Swamp Terrorists chronology
Grim – Stroke – Disease (1991)	Grow – Speed – Injection (1992)

Professional ratings
Review scores
Source	Rating
Q Magazine	2/5 stars

Grim – Stroke – Disease is the debut studio album of Swamp Terrorists, released in February 1991 by Machinery Records. Graeme Kay of Q Magazine was critical of the effort, noting how the 11 tracks "lack the personality to qualify as anything more that an anonymous part of a not very memorable whole".

== Track listing ==
All tracks are written by Michael Antener and Ane Hebeisen, except "Ostracize" with lyrics co-written with Wolf G. and "Girl the Truth" with lyrics co-written with Frank Farian

No.	Title	Length
1.	"Truth or Dare"	3:50
2.	"Nightmare"	4:19
3.	"So Sweet – It's Painful"	1:58
4.	"I Spit on You"	3:52
5.	"Stoneblind"	2:57
6.	"Baron Blood"	3:12
7.	"Ostracize"	3:43
8.	"Alka-Dig"	4:28
9.	"Deranged"	4:06
10.	"Torso (God Told Me To)"	1:39
11.	"Mortal Greyhound"	4:57
12.	"Girl the Truth"	2:36
13.	"Rosebud"	3:14
14.	"I Spit on You" (Slap-Mix)	3:52
15.	"Truth or Dare" (Mafia-Mix)	3:49
16.	"Ostracize" (Regulate-Mix)	3:43

== Personnel ==
Adapted from the Grim – Stroke – Disease liner notes.

Swamp Terrorists

- Michael Antener (as STR) – sampler, drum programming, sequencing, production, recording, mixing, mastering, design
- Ane Hebeisen (as Ane H.) – lead vocals, production, recording, mixing, mastering, design

Production and design

- Jor Jenka (as Jor) – executive-producer
- Ludwig – design
- Klaus Röthlisberger – recording, mixing and mastering (6, 8)
- Hans Ulrich – recording, mixing and mastering (1–5, 7, 9–16)

== Release history ==
Region	Date	Label	Format	Catalog
1991	Germany	Machinery	CD, LP	MA 3
