= Swamp Terrorists =

Swiss electro-industrial music group

- Origin: Switzerland
- Genres: Electro-industrial; industrial rock; industrial metal; rap; industrial hip hop
- Years active: 1989–1999
- Labels: 150 BPM; Alfa International; Contempo; Machinery; Metropolis; Noise; Sub/Mission
- Members: Ane Hebeisen (Ane H.); Base T.; Pit Lee; ND; Spring
- Past members: Michael Antener (STR); Francis Halioua

The Swamp Terrorists were a Swiss electro-industrial music group that was formed in 1988 by Michael Antener (a.k.a. STR), Ane Hebeisen (a.k.a. Ane H), and Francis Halioua. Their music is harsh pounding electro-industrial/industrial hip hop beats, turntables and occasional rapping mixed with grinding metal guitar riffs (which are usually sampled from other heavy metal bands), and produces a sound similar to Die Warzau, KMFDM and White Zombie.

== History ==
Michael Antener (a.k.a. STR) began making music in the early eighties under the moniker Bande Berne Crematoire which had limited cassette releases and compilation appearances. In 1983, Antener formed the band Nacht'Raum with Michael Stämpfli which produced minimal music in the Neue Deutsche Welle style. In 1996, Nacht'Raum broke up and Antener joined with guitarist Francis Halioua under the name Strangler Of The Swamp.

Antener and Halioua met Ane Hebeisen (a.k.a. Ane H) when Strangler Of The Swamp played at a festival with Hebeisen's band The Tierstein. The trio became friends and formed a short-lived band named The Disco Terrorists. In 1988, they renamed to Swamp Terrorists and met Reto Caduff of the band Séance who convinced the group to release their first EP on Caduff's recently formed label, 150 BPM Records.

Halioua departed from the group after the release of their first EP He is Guilty, after which Hebeisen and Antener recorded their first album Grim – Stroke – Disease together and released it on the Machinery/Noise label in 1991. About a year later, it was followed by Grow – Speed – Injection. The band toured Europe, including Germany, France, England, and Switzerland, in 1991 and 1992.

In 1992, Swamp Terrorists joined with two DJs from Zurich to produce The Forbidden Deejays' only release, also on Machinery Records, entitled I Like Texas.

After Grow – Speed – Injection, the band left Machinery and through their connection with Sebastian Koch (former member of Pankow) became one of the first bands signed to Sub/Mission Records. In 1993, the band began a habitual collaboration with DJ Killroy, with whom they had worked on The Forbidden Deejays, to produce remixes for many of their works.

In 1994, the band released the album Combat Shock, which found wider distribution including on Cargo/Re-Constriction in the US. That year the band created a hard techno project named Brainfuck, which provided the material for one of the two CDs released as The Get O. EP. Shortly after Combat Shock's release, Swamp Terrorists added several members for their live show: bassist Andrej Abplanalp, guitarist Spring and drummer Piet Hertig.

In 1995, the band embarked on tours in Europe, America, Canada, Brazil, Argentina, and Mexico.

The band released two CDs on Metropolis Records in 1996: Killer and a long play remix CD, Wreck. The band opted to release Wreck as a separate set of remixes to allow Killer to remain more coherent. After Killer, Antener and Hebeisen realized that they were each pulled in different musical directions, the result of which was Antener leaving the band to work with the guitar-heavy Hellsau, Antener subsequently released his pre-Swamp Terrorists music under the name Bande Berne Crematoire, and worked on new music under the moniker STR.

The remaining four members of the band as well as Antener's live replacement, ND, released a live album in 1997, Five in Japan, and the compilation, Rare & Unreleased, in 1999 on Metropolis Records. The band has been inactive since.

The band had a dedicated following in Brazil, where they have toured and where their international fan club was based.

Swamp Terrorists produced many remixes for other bands including The Clay People, Steril, Birmingham 6, Templebeat, Alien Faktor, and others.

== Discography ==
=== Discography ===
Studio albums

- Grim – Stroke – Disease (1990, Machinery)
- Grow – Speed – Injection (1991, Machinery)
- Combat Shock (1993, Alfa International/Contempo)
- Killer (1996, Metropolis)

Live albums

- Five in Japan (1997, Metropolis)

Compilation albums

- Rare & Unreleased (1999, Metropolis)

EPs

- He Is Guilty (1989, 150 BPM)
- Nightmare (1991, Noise)
- The Pale Torment EP (1994, Sub/Mission)
- The Get O. EP (1994, Sub/Mission)
- Dive-Right Jab: The Remixes (1995, Sub/Mission)
- Wreck (1996, Metropolis)

Singles

- "Rebuff!" (1991, Machinery)

=== Compilation appearances ===
- Trans Europa (A Swiss - Swedish Techno-Compilation) – (LP) 1989, Side A, Track #5 "Old Greyhound" - 150 BPM Records • (CD) 1989, Track #5 "Old Greyhound" - 150 BPM Records
- How To Use Machinery – (CD) 1991, Track #2 "So Sweet - It's Painful" - Machinery
- Tekk-Banger's Ball – (2xCD) 1992, Disc #2, Track #4 "Ratskin" - ZYX Records
- Funky Alternatives 7 – (CD) 1993, Track #3 "Rebuff (Exclusive Mix) " - Concrete Productions
- Grid Slinger – (LP) 1993, Side B, Track #1 "Come Back" - Re-constriction Records, Cleopatra
- How To Use Machinery II – (CD) 1993, Track #9 "Skizzo Pierce" and Track #11 "The Vault" - Machinery
- Terror - An Industrial Metal Compilation – (CD) 1993 Track #6 "Braintrash" - Mental Decay • (2xLP) 1993, Side B, Track #3 "Braintrash" - Mental Decay
- Trans Europa 2 (Swiss-Italian Techno-Crossover) – (CD) 1993, Track #6 "Cynic Forage (Remix)" - 150 BPM Records
- Chaos Compilation – (CD) 1994, Track #8 "Get O. (LP Mix)" - COP International
- Helvetic Art Compilation – (CD) 1994, Track #4 "Liberator" - Hall of Sermon
- The Digital Space Between – (CD) 1994, Track #11 "Pale Torment (Convert Single Remix)" - Hard Records
- Dion Fortune Sampler Vol. IV – (2xCD) 1995, Disc #1, Track #4 "Dicksmoker" - Dion Fortune
- Frostbyte – (CS, Promo) 1995, Side A, Track #2 "Come Back" and Side B, Track #1 "Liberator" - Re-constriction Records
- Magnetic Submission – (CD) 1995, Track #9 "Dive-Right Jab" - Musica Maxima Magnetica, Sub/Mission Records
- New Industries – (CD) 1995, Track #9 "Braintrash" - Dynamica
- Apocalypse Now 1 – (2xCD) 1996, Disc #1, Track #3 "Dive-Right Jab (Til You Drop)" - Sub Terranean
- Built For Stomping – (CD, Promo) 1996 - Track #14 "Liberator" - Re-constriction Records, Cleopatra
- Elektrauma Vol. 3 – (CD) 1996, Track #8 "Wreck (U.S. Version)" - Discordia
- Funky Alternatives - Best of Volume One to Eight – (CD, Box) 1996, Track #11 "Rebuff (Exclusive Mix)" - Concrete Productions, Indigo
- Industrial Revolution: 3rd Edition Rare & Unreleased – (2xCD) 1996, Disc #1, Track #13 "Dive-Right Jab (Till You Drop)" - Cleopatra
- Sound-Line Vol. 4 – (CD) 1996, Track #9 "Shape of Rage" - Side-Line
- Sweet Sub/Mission – (CD) 1996, Track #1 "Dive-Right Jab ('Til You Drop KMFDM Remix)" and Track #2 "Rebel Shade (Rough Edit)" - Sub/Mission Records
- 'Sweet Sub/Mission Vol. 1 – (CD) 1996, Track #1 "Dive-Right Jab ('Til You Drop KMFDM Remix)" and Track #2 "Rebel Shade" - Fifth Colvmn Records
- The Digital Space Between Vol. 3 – (CD) 1996, Track #6 "Get O. (Twisted Mix) - Cleopatra
- Industrial Virus – (3xCD, Box) 1997, Disc #2, Track #3 "Rebuff (Remix) - Dressed to Kill
- Minimal Synth Ethics 4 – (CD) 1997, Track #3 "Try My Flesh (Visceral Penetration)" - Cri Du Chat
- More Exclusive Alternatives – (CD) 1997, Track #8 "Rebuff" - Cleopatra
- Industrial Hazard – (3xCD, Box) 1998, Disc #2, Track #3 "Rebuff (Remix)" - Dressed to Kill
- Five Years of Electronic Tears – (2xCD) 1999, Disc #2, Track #3 "Pale Torment (Convert Single Mix)" - Cyberware Productions
- Machines and Noise (Volume 2) – (CD) 2002, Track #5 "Rebuff" - Mastertech Pty Ltd.
