= Dr. Doom (disambiguation) =

Doctor Doom is a Marvel comic book supervillain.

Dr. Doom may also refer to:

- Doctor Doom character appearing in Fox Comics' Science Comics in 1940
- Robert Brazile (b. 1953), American football linebacker for the Houston Oilers
- Travis Doom (b. 1970) Emeritus Professor at Wright State University
- Marc Faber (b. 1946), Swiss investment analyst and author of The Gloom Boom & Doom Report
- Henry Kaufman (b. 1927), German-born American economist and former vice-chairman of Salomon Inc.
- Nouriel Roubini (b. 1959), Turkish-born American economist and professor
- Peter Schiff (b. 1964), American investment analyst and president of Euro Pacific Capital Inc.
- Keith Matthew Thornton (b. 1963), American rapper Kool Keith (alias Dr. Dooom)

== See also ==
- Doom (disambiguation)
- MF Doom
- Doctor Droom
