= Dhoom (disambiguation) =

Dhoom is a 2004 Indian action thriller film by Sanjay Gadhvi.

Dhoom may also refer to:

- Dhoom (film series), Indian action film series
  - "Dhoom Dhoom" (also "Dhoom Machao Dhoom"), title track of the 2004 film by Tata Young
    - Dhoom Dhoom (EP), an EP by Young
  - Dhoom 2, a 2006 sequel film by Gadhvi
  - Dhoom 3, a 2013 film by Vijay Krishna Acharya, the third part of the series
    - Dhoom 3 (soundtrack), by Pritam
- Dhoom (Call album), 2011 rock album
- Dhoom (Euphoria album), 1998 rock album

== See also ==
- Doom (disambiguation)
- Dhoomam (disambiguation)
- Dhoom Machaao Dhoom, Indian TV series
