= Sebastiaen Vrancx =

Flemish painter (1573–1647)

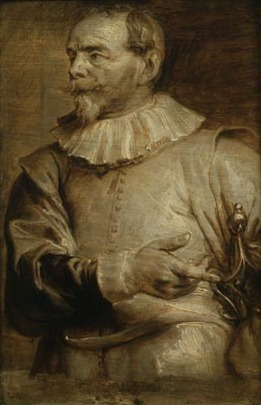
Sebastiaen Vrancx by Anthony van Dyck

Sebastiaen Vrancx (Note: First name is variously spelled as Sebastiaen, Sebastiaan or Sebastian; last name variously spelled as Vrancx, Vranckx, Franck or Franks.) (pronounced [səbɑstiˈjaːɱ ˈvrɑŋks]; before 22 January 1573 – 19 May 1647) was a Flemish Baroque painter, draughtsman and designer of prints who is mainly known for his battle scenes, a genre that he pioneered in Netherlandish painting. He also created landscapes with mythological and allegorical scenes, scenes with robbers, village scenes and celebrations in cities. He was a gifted figure painter who was regularly invited to paint the staffage in compositions of fellow painters. As an active member of a local chamber of rhetoric, he wrote comedies and a number of poems. He was further captain of the Antwerp schutterij (civic guard).

== Life ==
Sebastiaen Vrancx was baptized on 22 January 1573 in the St James Church in Antwerp. His father Jan was a merchant. His mother was Barbara Coutereau.

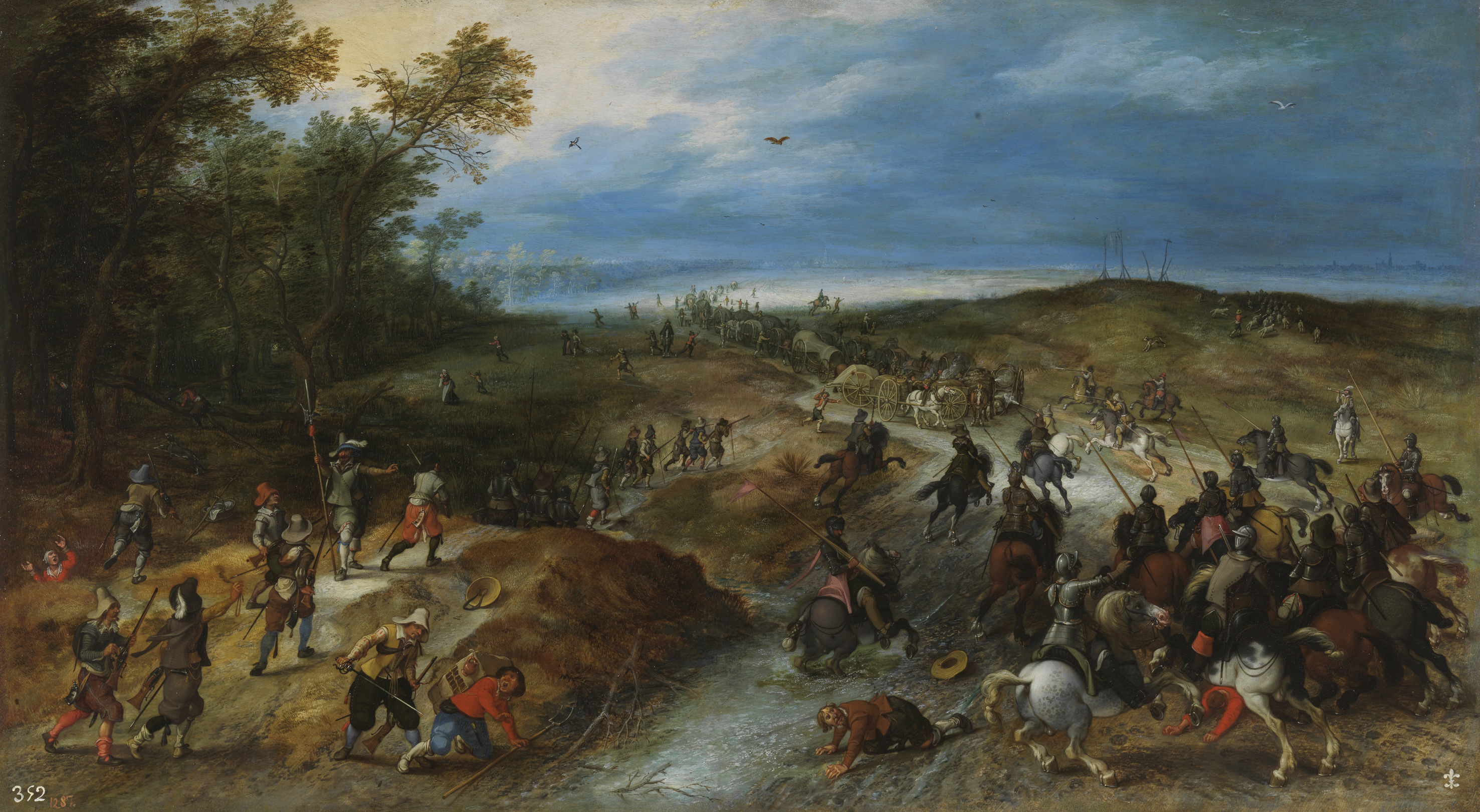
Assault on a convoy

He was an apprentice in the workshop of Adam van Noort, who was also the master of other prominent Antwerp painters such as Peter Paul Rubens, Jacob Jordaens and Hendrick van Balen. It is believed that after finishing his apprenticeship, the artist visited Italy as he only became a master of the Antwerp Guild of Saint Luke in 1600.

He commenced his career in Antwerp and gained the recognition of his fellow artists. He was particularly esteemed as a painter of battle scenes and Peter Paul Rubens is known to have owned a battle scene by the artist.

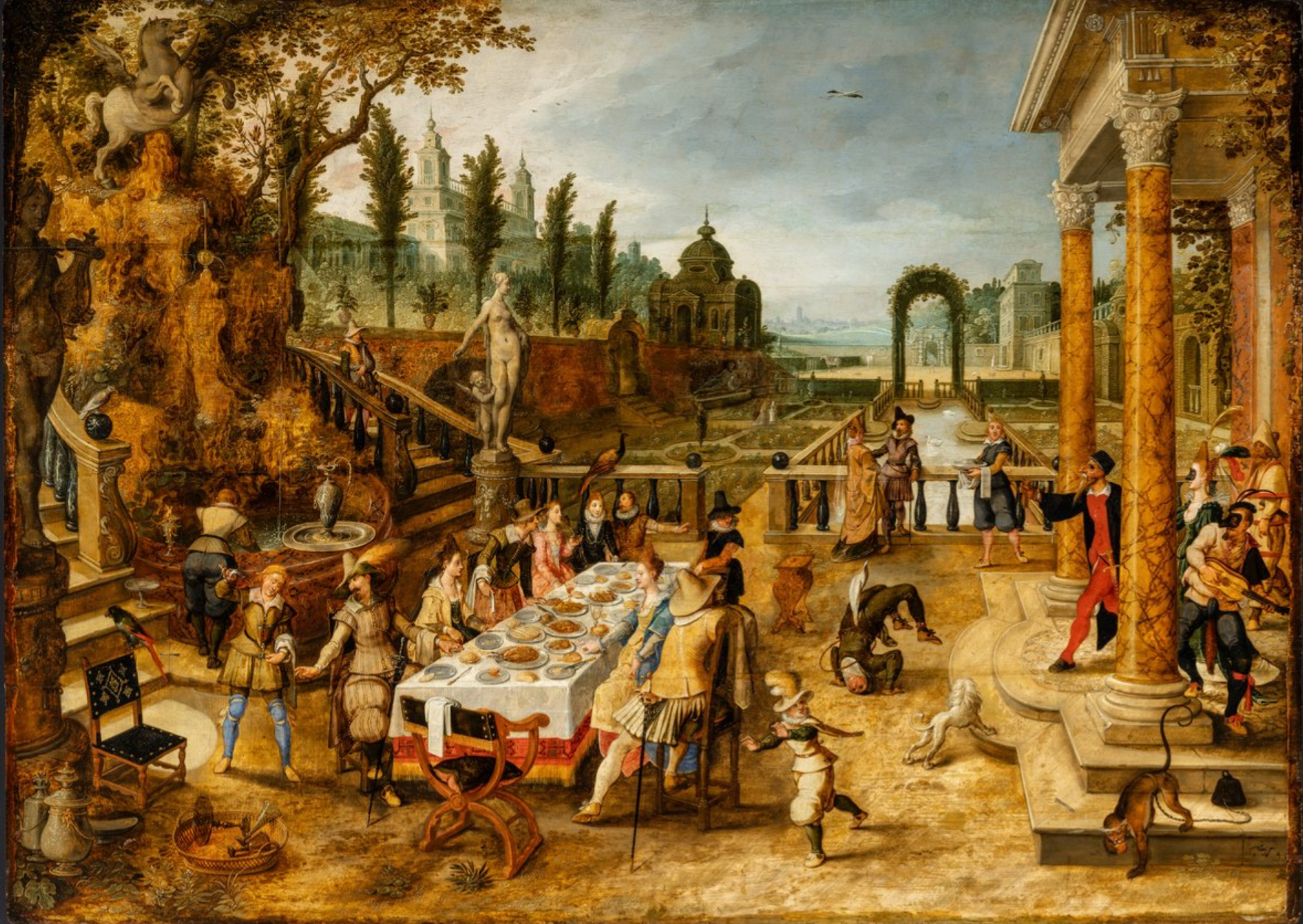
Outdoor banquet

In 1610 he was invited to join the elite Confrerie of Romanists, a society of Antwerp humanists and artists. A condition of admission was that the member had travelled to Rome. The diversity and high positions held by the Confrerie's membership offered him a good opportunity to meet with potential patrons. He was elected the dean of the painter's chamber of the Guild in 1611. Vrancx was a member and district head of the local civic guard from 1613 onwards and was in 1626 asked by the Antwerp mayor to serve a five-year term as the captain of the guard in return for a complete exemption from taxes and municipal services. The position entitled Vrancx to carry a sword. It was in a vigorous pose with a sword on his side that he was portrayed by Anthony van Dyck.

Vrancx was a member of the chamber of rhetoric Violieren, which was linked to the Guild of Saint Luke. He was very active in the chamber of rhetoric and when he served as its factor he wrote about 13 comedies and a number of poems. Vrancx collaborated with Jan Brueghel the Younger, Hendrick van Balen and Frans Francken the Younger on an emblem for the Violieren for which the Violieren obtained a first prize in 1618.

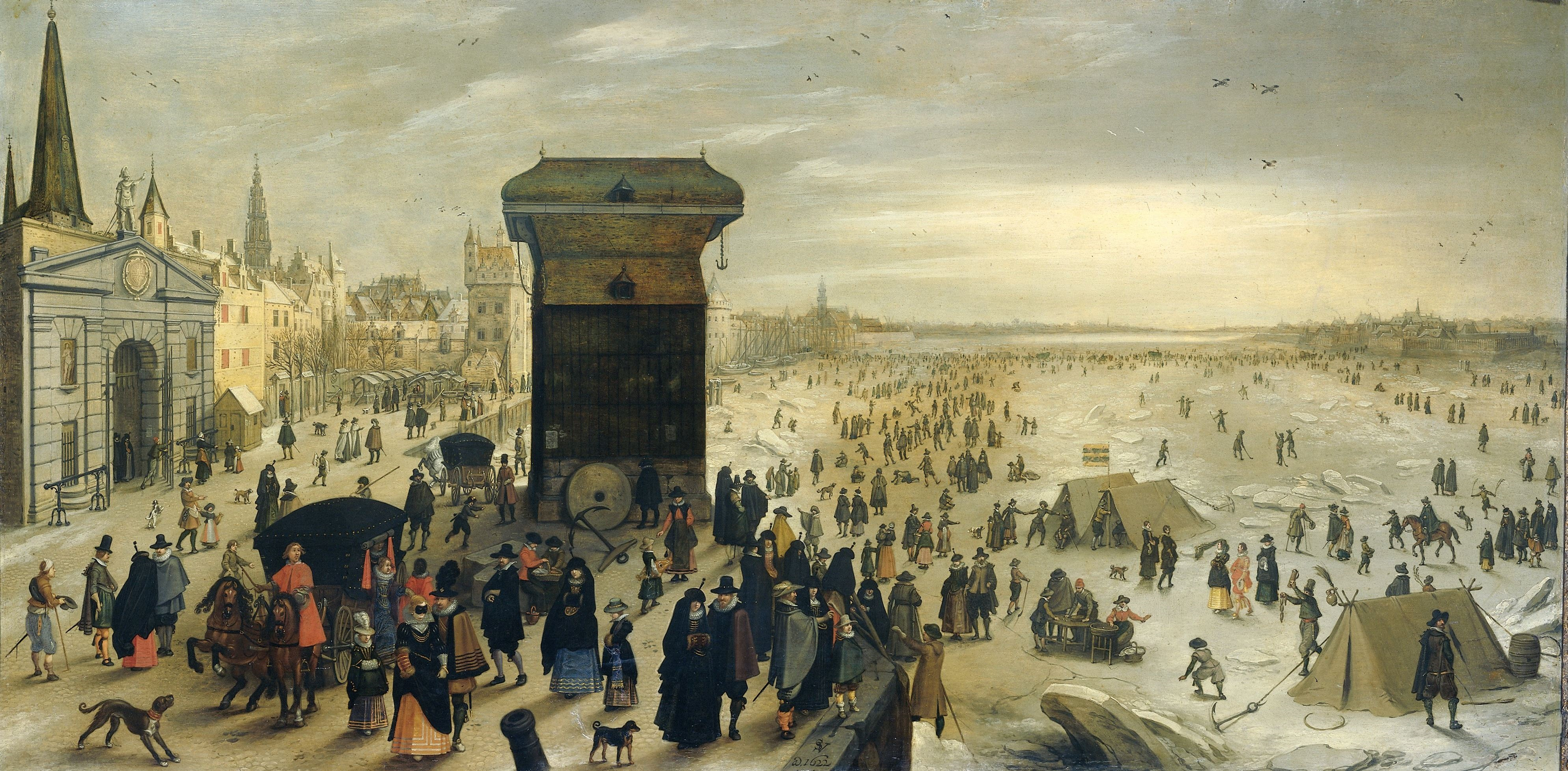
Ice pleasure on the Scheldt in Antwerp

Vrancx met with personal tragedy when his wife and sole child Barbara died a few months from each other in 1639. He himself died on 19 May 1647 in Antwerp.

The pupils of Vrancx included Peter Snayers who became a leading battle painter and Balthasar Courtois, whose work is virtually unknown. There is no clear view of the size of Vrancx' studio. In a letter of 1634, Jan Brueghel the Younger wrote to his business partner in Seville that: 'Vrancx has plenty to do but refuses to employ studio assistants, which means that work takes a long time. He does not allow copies to be put into circulation'.

== Work ==
Sebastiaen Vrancx is now mainly known for his battle scenes, this was possibly inspired by him being a member of the citizens guard and the fencers guild since 1613. His subject matter was, however, much wider than solely battle scenes. He painted landscapes with mythological and religious scenes, allegories of the seasons and months, city views, banquet scenes, village scenes, genre scenes, Brueghelian scenes and even architectural paintings.

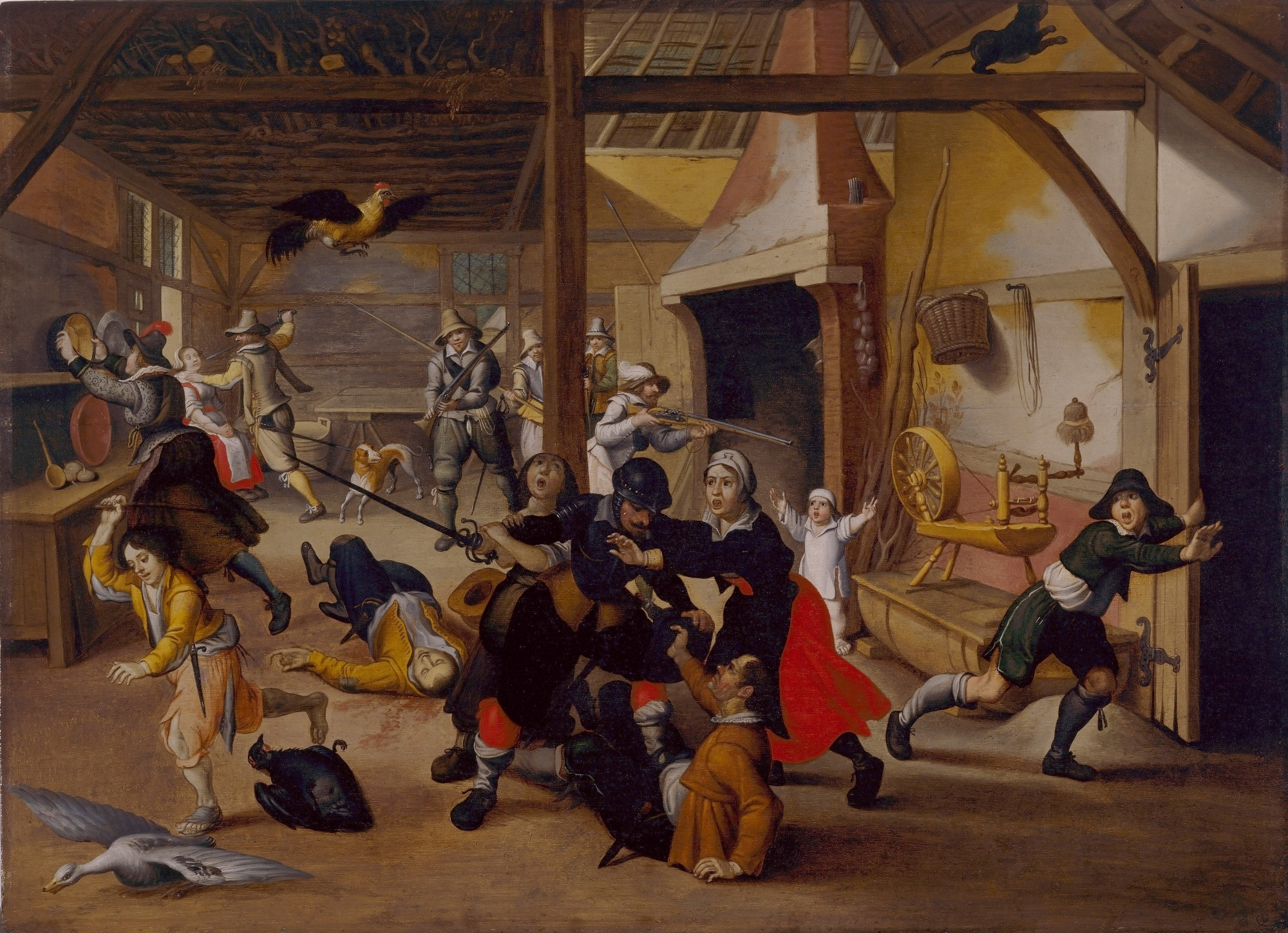
Soldiers plundering

He is also known for a series of drawings depicting scenes from Virgil's Aeneid. He also produced designs for the Antwerp printmakers and publishers.

== War artist ==
Sebastiaen Vrancx was probably the first artist in the Northern or Southern Netherlands who created depictions of battle scenes. His experience as an officer and captain of the Antwerp civic guard may have played a role in his interest in developing this genre. Approximately half of his known works are devoted to military scenes.

His first-hand experience in military matters likely inspired his treatment of the subject and supported his skill in the depiction of cavalry engagements and battles of the Eighty Years' War. Vrancx became a very influential figure in the development of this subject matter.

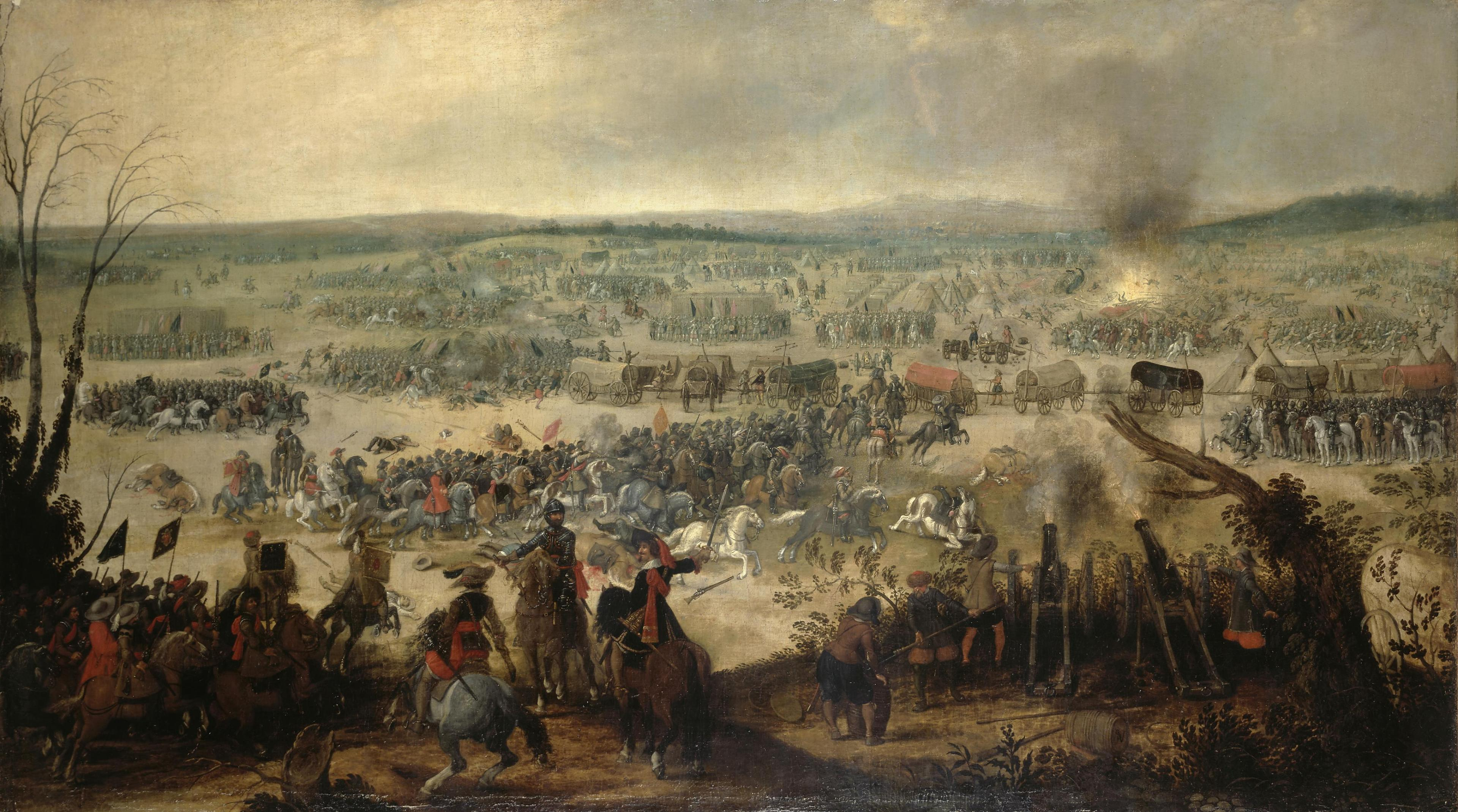
Battle of Vimpfen on 6 May 1622

From the period 1611–25, his style had developed so that his landscapes and the figures in them showed the clear-cut and determined handling of form characteristic of his mature style. He achieved greater control of the representation of space and of large and more complex groups of figures. In his mature later period from the 1630s onwards his compositions were characterized by more attenuated and pearly tonalities and a less compact but more dynamic execution of the trees. Vrancx's mature style further features complex figure groups engaging within vast landscapes.

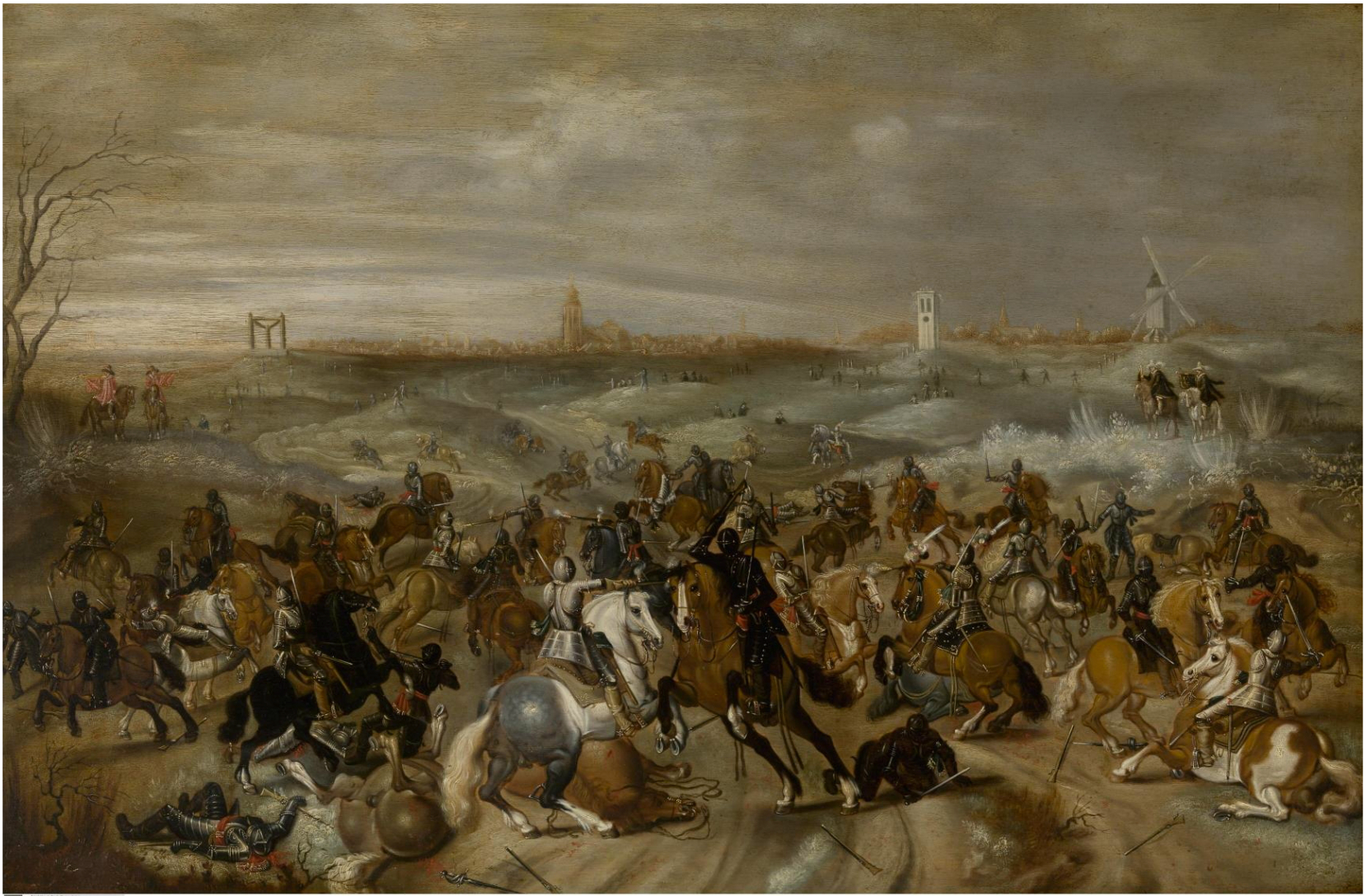
The battle of Leckerbeetje

One of the subjects to which he returned regularly was that of the Battle between Lekkerbeetje and de Bréauté on the Heath of Vught. The subject took its inspiration from an event that occurred on 5 February 1600 when an overly-confident young French commander by the name of Pierre de Bréauté was challenged to a duel by Spanish Cavalry Lieutenant Gerard van Houwelingen, known by his nickname Lekkerbeetje, after he supposedly claimed his own horsemen better than the Spaniard's. The battle was fought on the Heath of Vught, a small wooded area near the town of Vught, between the town gallows and the mill. Each side had 21 horsemen armed with swords and pistols. Lekkerbeetje was killed at the start of the engagement with a single pistol shot. During the skirmish the French suffered a total of 19 fatalities. Pierre de Bréauté was caught and then killed by his opponents. The subject of this battle became so popular at the time because it celebrated the by then essentially defunct chivalric practice of duelling.

A subject matter closely related to the military scenes are his scenes of assaults by robbers on travelers and of soldiers plundering villages. An example is the Attack of Robbers (the Hermitage Museum). The picture narrates a scene of travellers on horses attempting to ward off an attack of robbers. Many of his scenes of ambushes reflect the helplessness of the civilian victims.

Vrancx had various followers in the southern Netherlands including Pieter Meulener, Jacques van der Wijen and Adam Frans van der Meulen, who was a pupil of Peter Snayers (a pupil of Vrancx) and later moved to France. In the northern Netherlands Vrancx's influence can be seen clearly in the work of Esaias van de Velde and Pauwels van Hillegaert. Vrancx's cavalry scenes remained conservative, comparable with those by Antonio Tempesta.

== The four seasons ==
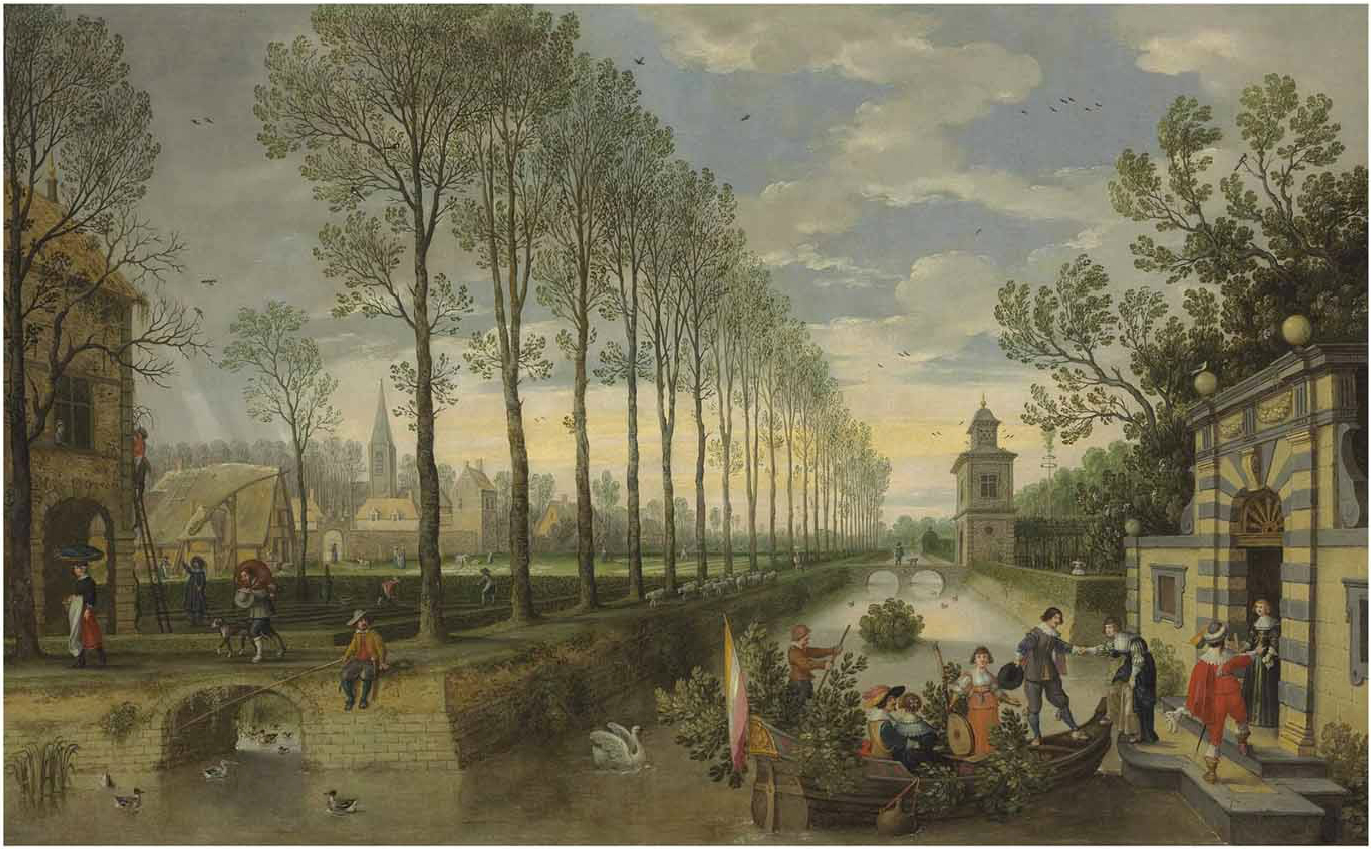
Spring

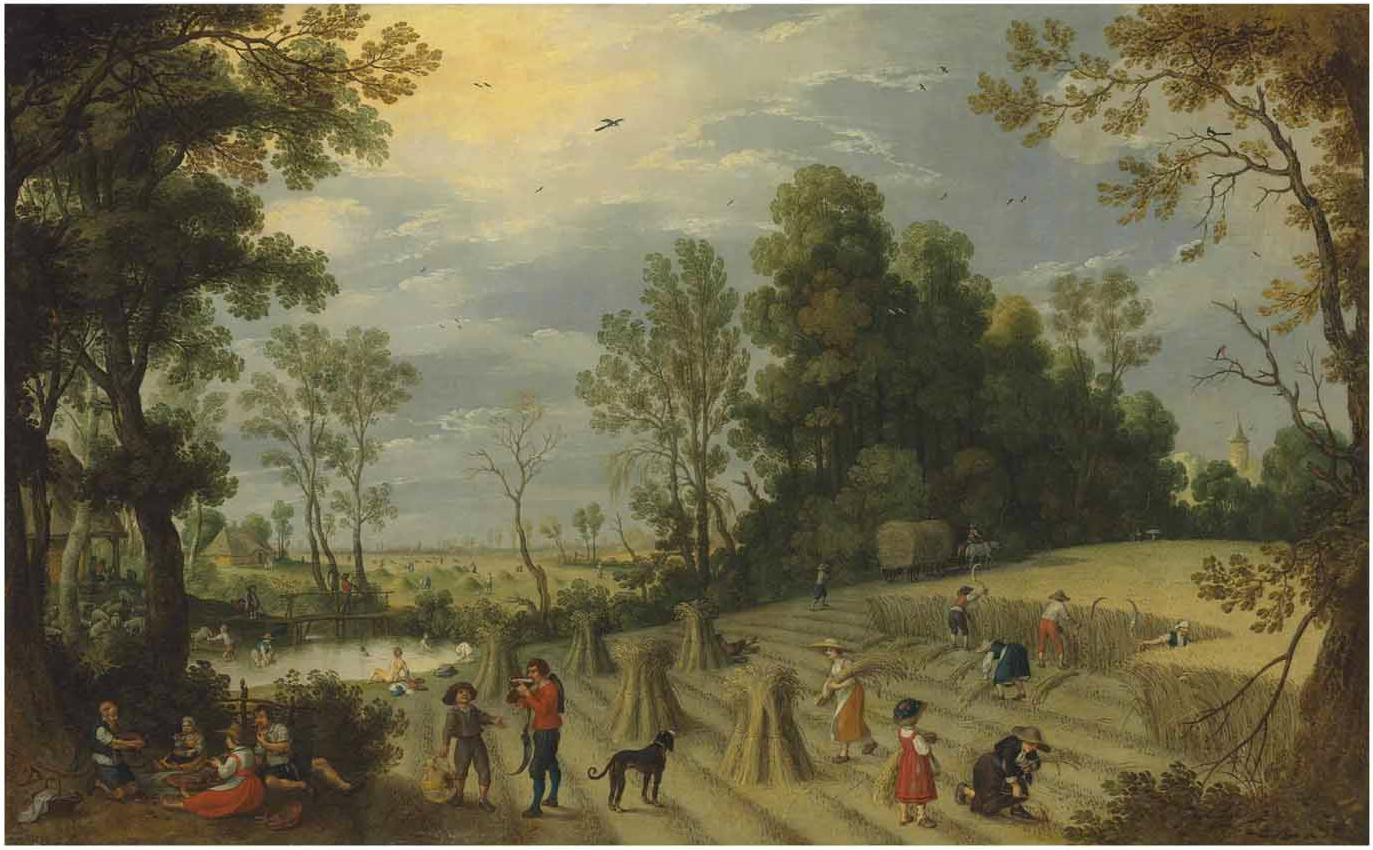
Summer

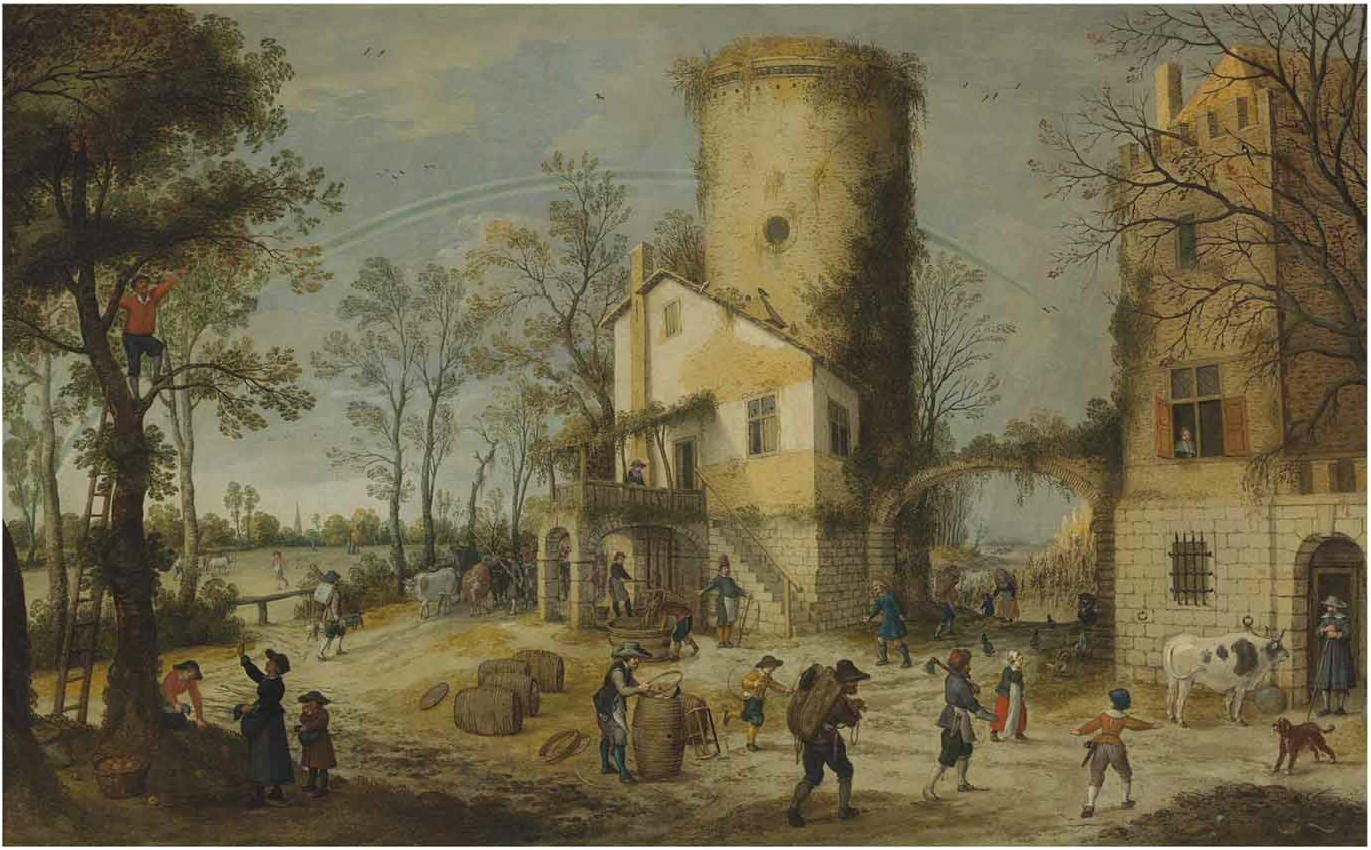
Autumn

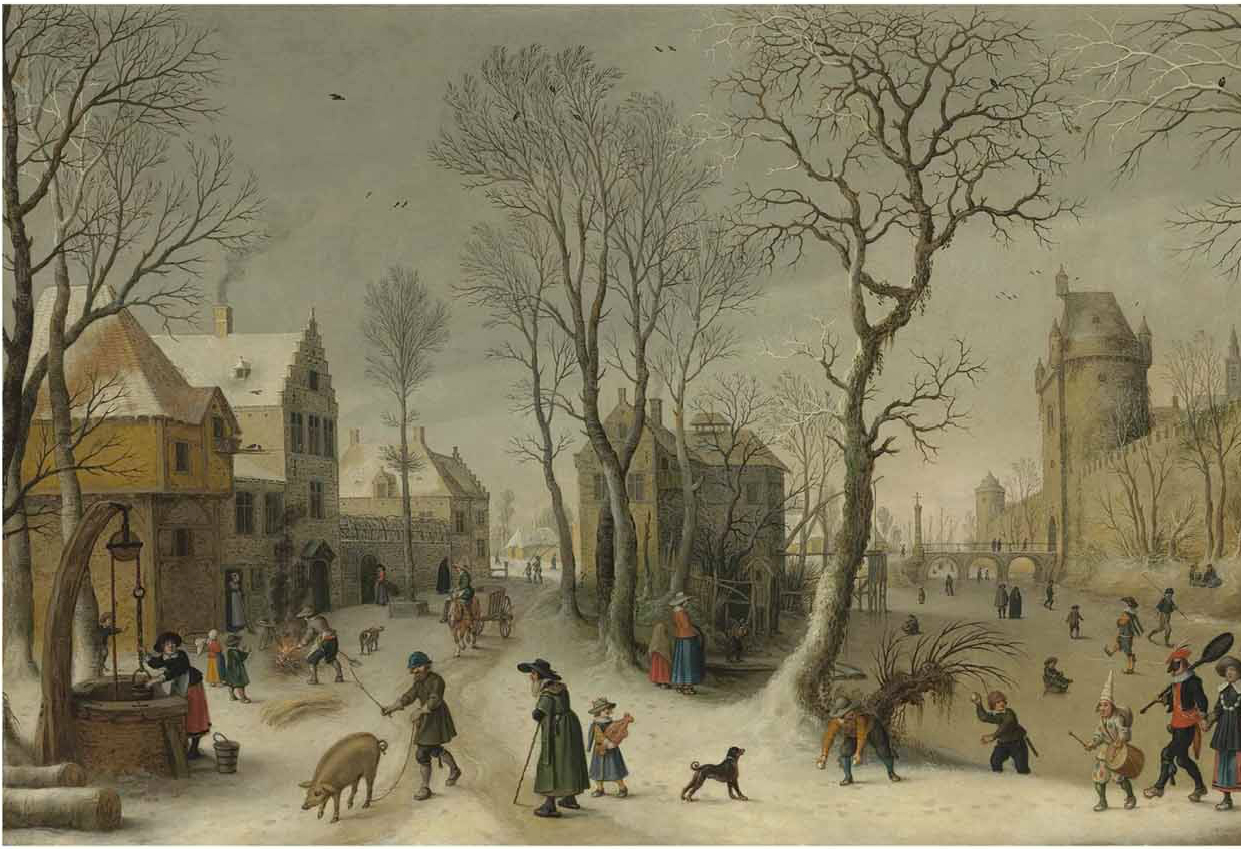
Winter

The Four Seasons

Vrancx created various series of paintings representing the Four Seasons or the Months of the Year. In these allegorical pictures each month or season is characterized by the varying phases of the landscape and the associated human activities. These paintings were very popular in Flemish painting in the late 16th and early 17th centuries. Pieter Bruegel the Elder founded the genre as an independent category of painting with his influential cycle of the Months painted for the home of his patron Nicolaes Jongelinck. Series of twelve panels of individual months, of six panels each representing two months, as well as sets of the four seasons were produced by a number of artists.

In a set of the Four Seasons (auctioned at Christie's on 9 July 2015, London, lot 28) Sebastiaen Vrancx incorporated a number of stock motifs and charming details into the landscapes to represent the seasons. Spring shows an elegant boating party engaged in courtly love and peasants tending gardens, herding sheep and bleaching cloth. Summer offers a panoramic view of labourers at work, picnicking and bathing in a nearby pond during the harvest. Autumn is set in a farm courtyard where workers are busy picking apples and delivering bags full of harvested grapes to be pressed. Winter is set in a snow-blanketed hamlet on the outskirts of a walled city, with carnival revellers and ice skaters on a frozen moat.

== Genre paintings ==
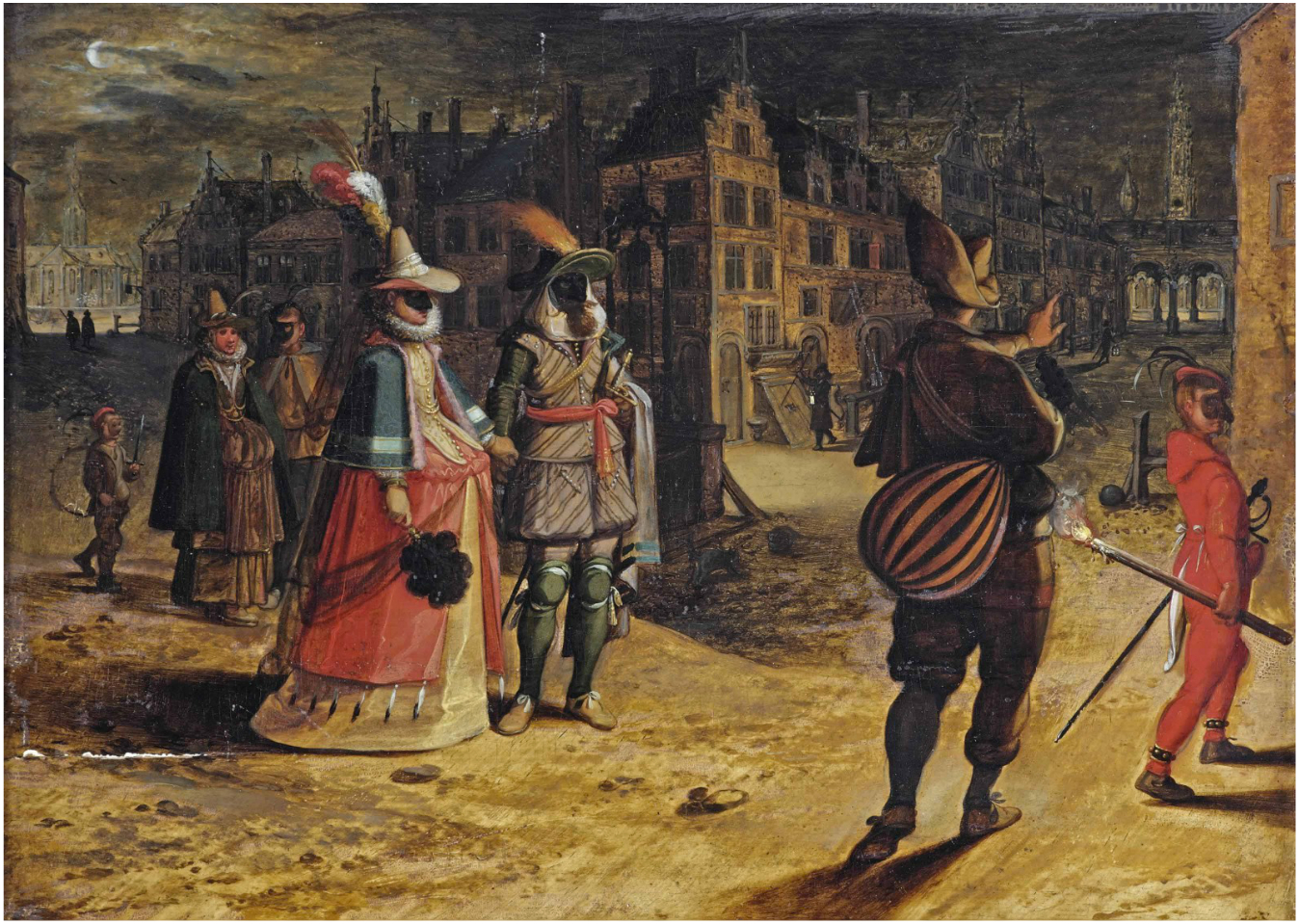
A view of Antwerp by night with elegant figures on their way to a masquerade

Sebastiaen Vrancx started his career in Italy by painting Mannerist cabinet-sized Biblical scenes that are reminiscent of Paul Bril and Jan Brueghel the Elder. After returning to his home country he turned to genre subjects. He created a number of village and city scenes. Some scenes depicted masked persons and may have been based on his experience as a writer for, and actor in, plays produced by the chamber of rhetoric. An example is A view of Antwerp by night with elegant figures on their way to a masquerade (at Christie's on 23–24 June 2015, Amsterdam lot 45). In this night scene Vrancx was able to capture the effects of moonlight and torchlight. The nocturnal ambiance is made palpable with naturalistic and keenly observed scenes such as the two cats in the centre shown as mere silhouettes and about to attack each other. The composition demonstrates his attention for the attire of the figures, an interest also reflected in Vrancx' designs for a series of prints by Pieter de Jode I, which depict the dresses of various countries known as the Variarum Gentium Ornatus.

He also painted the composition Uniformed monkeys and cats which falls into the genre of the singerie, which shows representations of monkeys engaging in human activities. In this genre the monkeys were often dressed in costumes which added comedy to the 'aping' by the monkeys of a specific human action (often vices) or occupation.

== Architectural painting ==
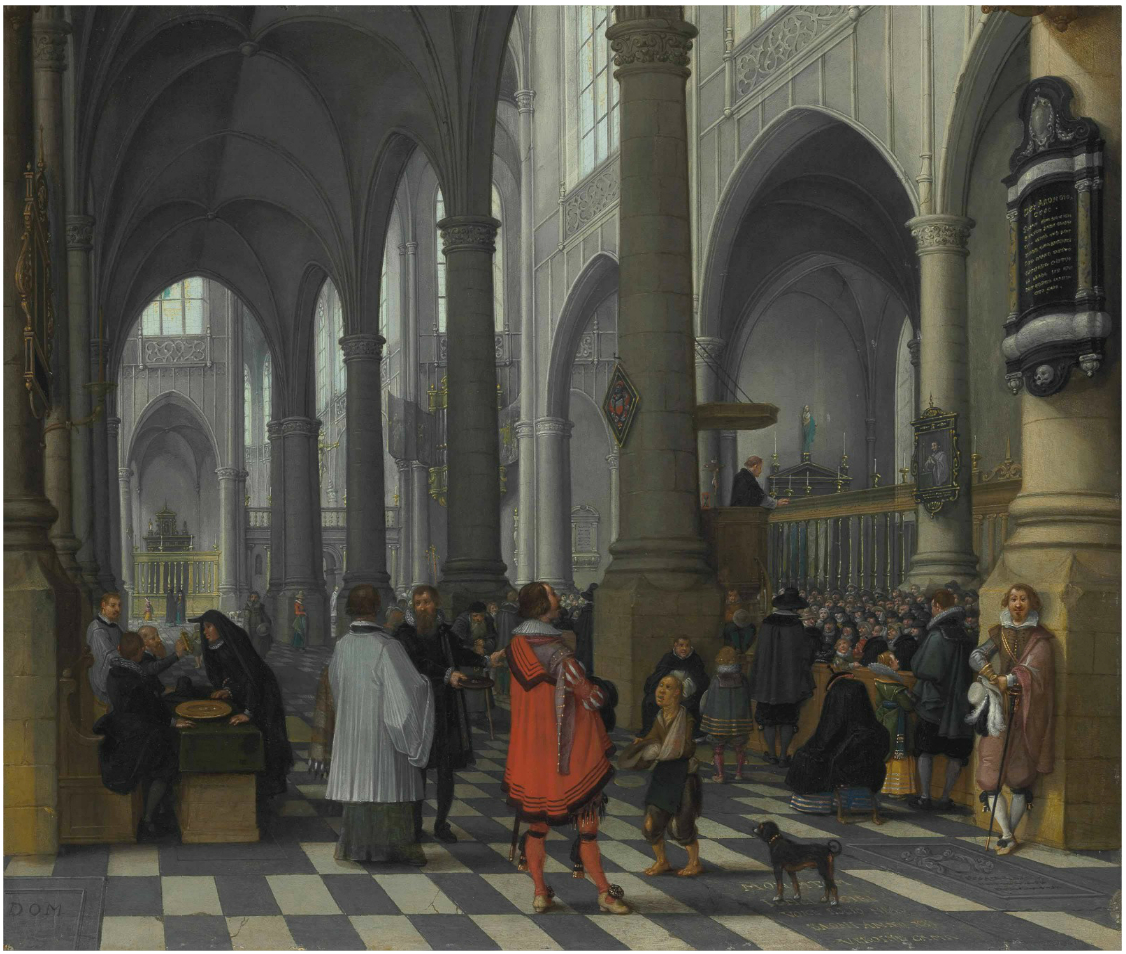
Interior of the Saint James Church in Antwerp

Vrancx collaborated with the architectural painter Pieter Neefs the Elder. He added staffage to Neefs' church interiors. An example is the Interior of the Jesuit church of Antwerp (Kunsthistorisches Museum, Vienna). Neefs is considered to be a representative of the Antwerp school of architectural painting. Typical for the style was the use of a rigid linear perspective which offered a view directly down the nave of the church.

Vrancx produced himself architectural paintings of church interiors. An example is the Interior of the Saint James Church in Antwerp (at Christie's on 14 April 2016, New York lot 108). Vrancx' composition depicts the lofty, light-filled interior of the Saint James Church in Antwerp, where a priest is giving a sermon to the masses while elegantly dressed onlookers walk around the aisle. He used a predominantly neutral palette to which he added carefully placed touches of cardinal red to bold effect, from the case of the hourglass perched on the priest's pulpit to the brilliant cape and stockings of the gentleman in the central foreground who serves as the painting's visual anchor. At the right a man holding a plumed hat and in lavender attire is leaning against the base of a column at right. He is gazing directly at the viewer with bemused confidence. The figure may be a self-portrait as he bears a strong resemblance to Anthony van Dyck's portrait of the artist. This composition does not use the rigid linear perspective view directly down the nave of the church, which was common in the works of the church painters of the Antwerp school.

== Collaborations ==
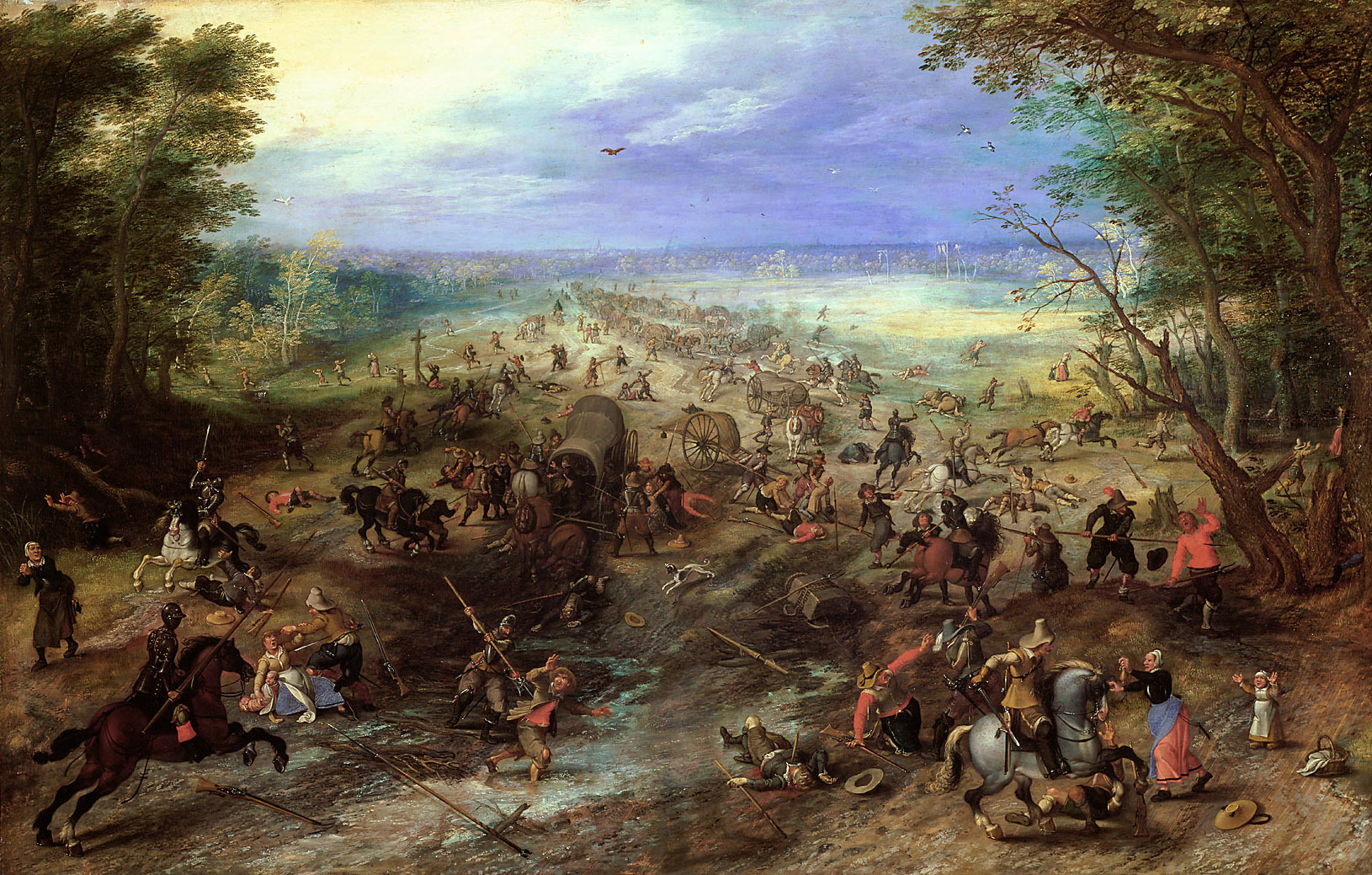
Assault on a Convoy, with Jan Breughel the Elder

He worked with a number of other painters in Antwerp, such as Jan Brueghel the Elder, Jan Brueghel the Younger, David Vinckboons, Rubens, Frans Francken the Younger, van Balen, Frans Snyders and Joos de Momper the Younger. An example of a collaboration with Jan Brueghel the Elder is Assault on a Convoy (Kunsthistorisches Museum) in which Vrancx painted the figures in the landscape created by Brueghel.

== Drawings ==
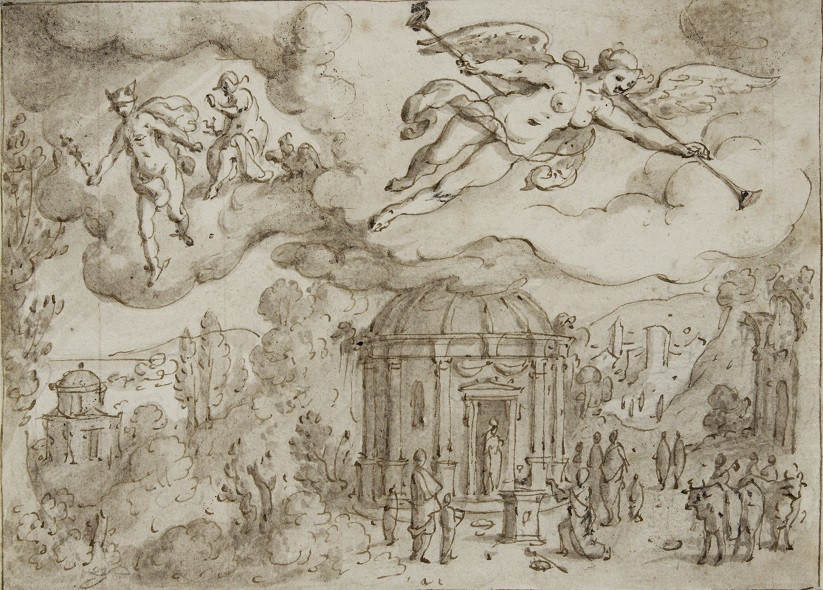
Fame announces the union of Dido and Aeneas

A series of 65 drawings recounting incidents in the Aeneid have been attributed to Sebastiaen Vrancx. Of these, 59 were part of a private collection until they were auctioned off at Drouot, Paris on 9 October 1981. Some of these drawings are now in the collection of major museums, including the Plantin-Moretus Museum, the Fogg Art Museum, the Yale University Art Gallery, the Morgan Library & Museum, the Metropolitan Museum and the Louvre.

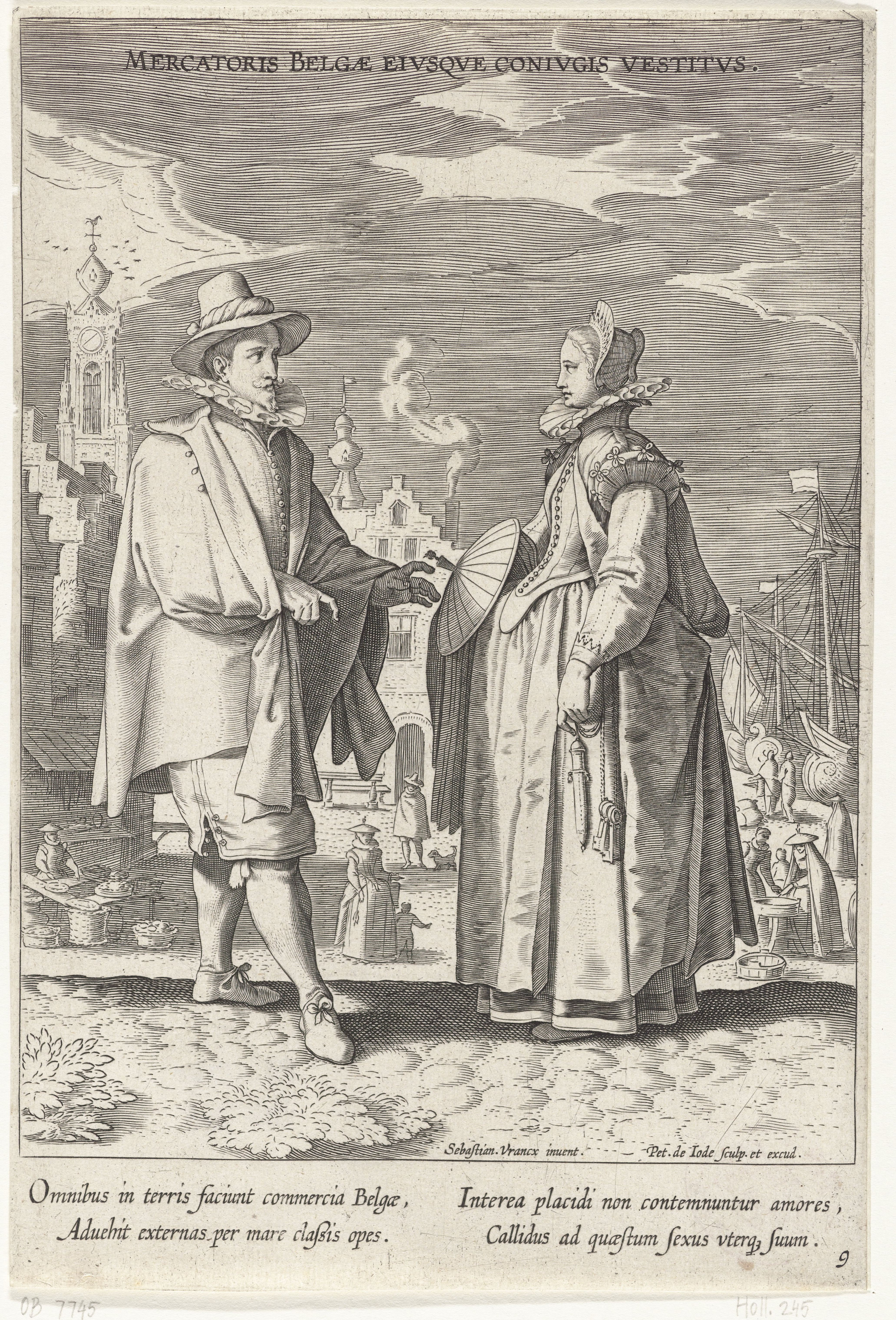
Variarum Gentium Ornatus: Flemish fashion

The drawings are dated to around 1615, or possibly a later date, about 1625–1630. Most of the scenes represented occupy the upper half of the sheet, the lower half being reserved for the text from the Aeneid. The upper part has been cut off in some drawings leaving only the illustration. Whatever the case, the different compositions present a similar size. The handwritten narration is a Dutch translation of Virgil. It is not known if the translation was made by Vrancx himself. The translation was probably meant to be published and the illustrations engraved, but the project was apparently never carried out.

In the Aeneid cycle drawings, Vrancx did not individualise the facial features. It is only through the actions in which the figures are involved that it is possible to identify them. Vrancx used short, angular strokes to outline the main elements in each scene.

Vrancx drew the designs for a series of 10 plates engraved by Pieter de Jode I and published by de Jode in Antwerp between 1605 and 1610 under the title Variarum Gentium Ornatus (Costumes of Different Nations). The series shows the local scenery and fashions in various nations including Germany, France, Rome, Milan, the Low Countries and Spain. They occasionally include famous monuments in the distance, such as the Trajan Column in Rome. The inscriptions typically do not mention clothing, except plate 2 which notes that the French constantly update their outfits – a stereotypical view of the period.
