= Dilly Dally =

Canadian alternative rock band

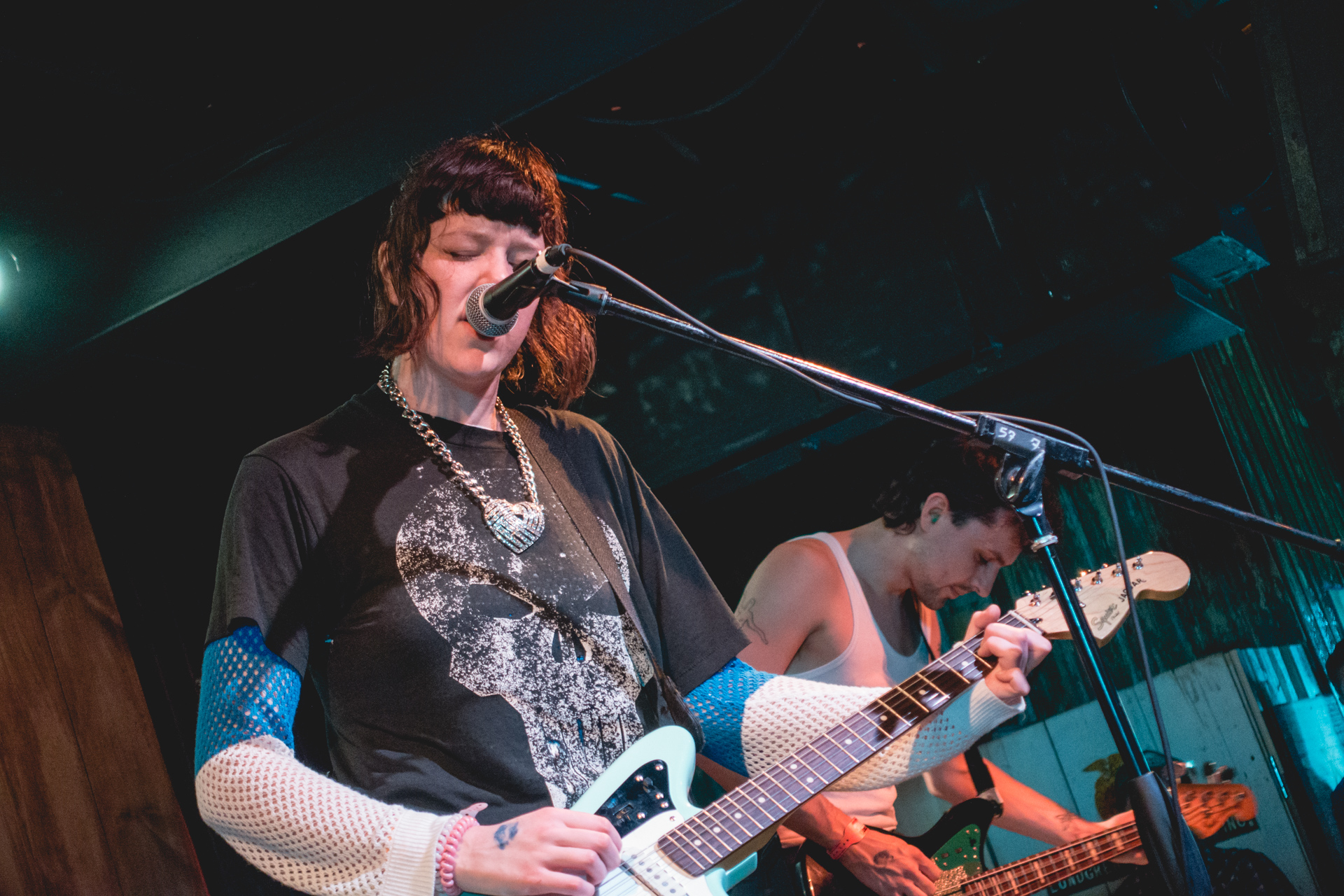
- Dilly Dally performing in March 2016

Background information
- Origin: Toronto, Ontario, Canada
- Genres: Alternative rock; post-grunge
- Years active: 2009–2023
- Labels: Partisan Records; Dine Alone; Buzz Records
- Members: Enda Monks; Liz Ball; Annie Jane Marie; Benjamin Reinhartz

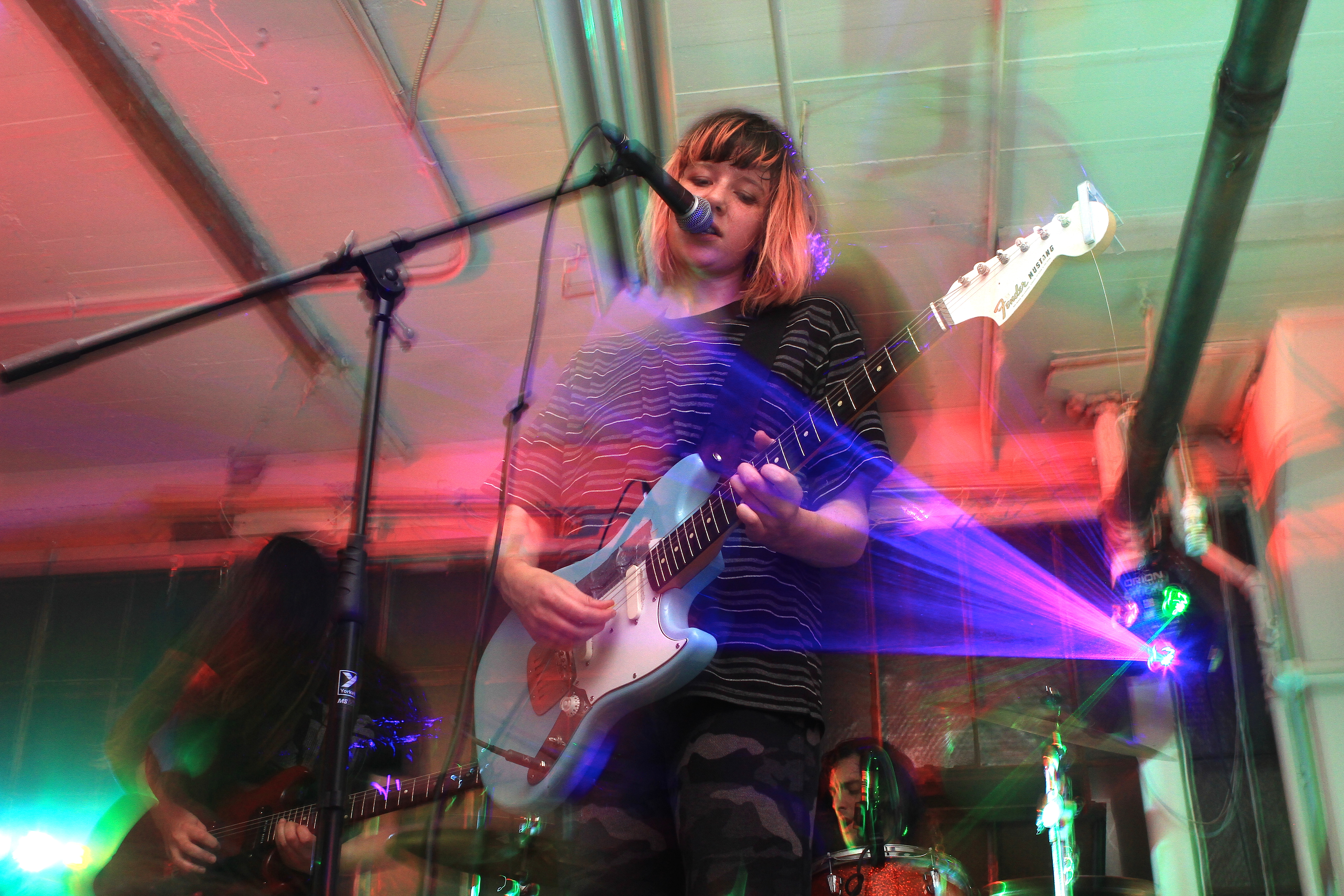
Dilly Dally album release (888 Dupont), October 8, 2015

Dilly Dally was a Canadian alternative rock band from Toronto. The band consisted of Enda Monks (rhythm guitar and vocals), Liz Ball (lead guitar), Annie Jane Marie (bassist) and Benjamin Reinhartz (drummer). They announced their breakup on March 2, 2023.

Dilly Dally released three singles, one 7" ("Candy Mountain", 2014) and two full-length albums, Sore (2015) and Heaven (2018).

== History ==
=== Early years (2009–2014) ===
Dilly Dally was formed in 2009 by childhood friends Enda Monks and Liz Ball. Monks and Ball met while in high school in Newmarket, Ontario, just outside of Toronto. The two self-taught guitarists were determined to start a band and developed their sound through years of playing shows in the Toronto alternative and punk scenes. The band is known for their signature guitar tones as well as Monk's raspy vocals.

Monks and Ball self-released the band's first single, "Next Gold", in 2013 with an alternate rhythm section. In 2013, Benjamin Reinhartz (drummer) and Annie Jane Marie (bassist) joined the project: the new musicians helped solidify the band's sound. In 2014, Buzz Records (Canada) and Fat Possum Records (United States) released their first 7", "Candy Mountain", but there was limited public interest in the band.

After a positive Pitchfork review of the "Next Gold" single, Dilly Dally's notoriety increased internationally.

=== Sore (2015–2017) ===
Dilly Dally's first full-length album, Sore, was released on October 9, 2015, on Buzz Records in Canada and Partisan Records in the United States and United Kingdom.

Sore was a longlisted nominee for the 2016 Polaris Music Prize, as well as a Juno Award nominee for Alternative Album of the Year at the Juno Awards of 2017. The single "Desire" was a SOCAN Songwriting Prize finalist in 2016. Additionally, the video for "Snakehead" was long-listed for the Prism Prize in 2017. Sore was featured on Exclaim! "50 Best Canadian Albums of the 2010s" list.

The band toured extensively during the Sore album cycle. Monks recalls: "When you put four people in a box for two years, it's psychologically fucked. (...) The machine was going full speed ahead. As the manager, I just kept confirming dates." The relentless pace of those tours almost caused the band to break up.

=== Heaven (2018–2019) ===
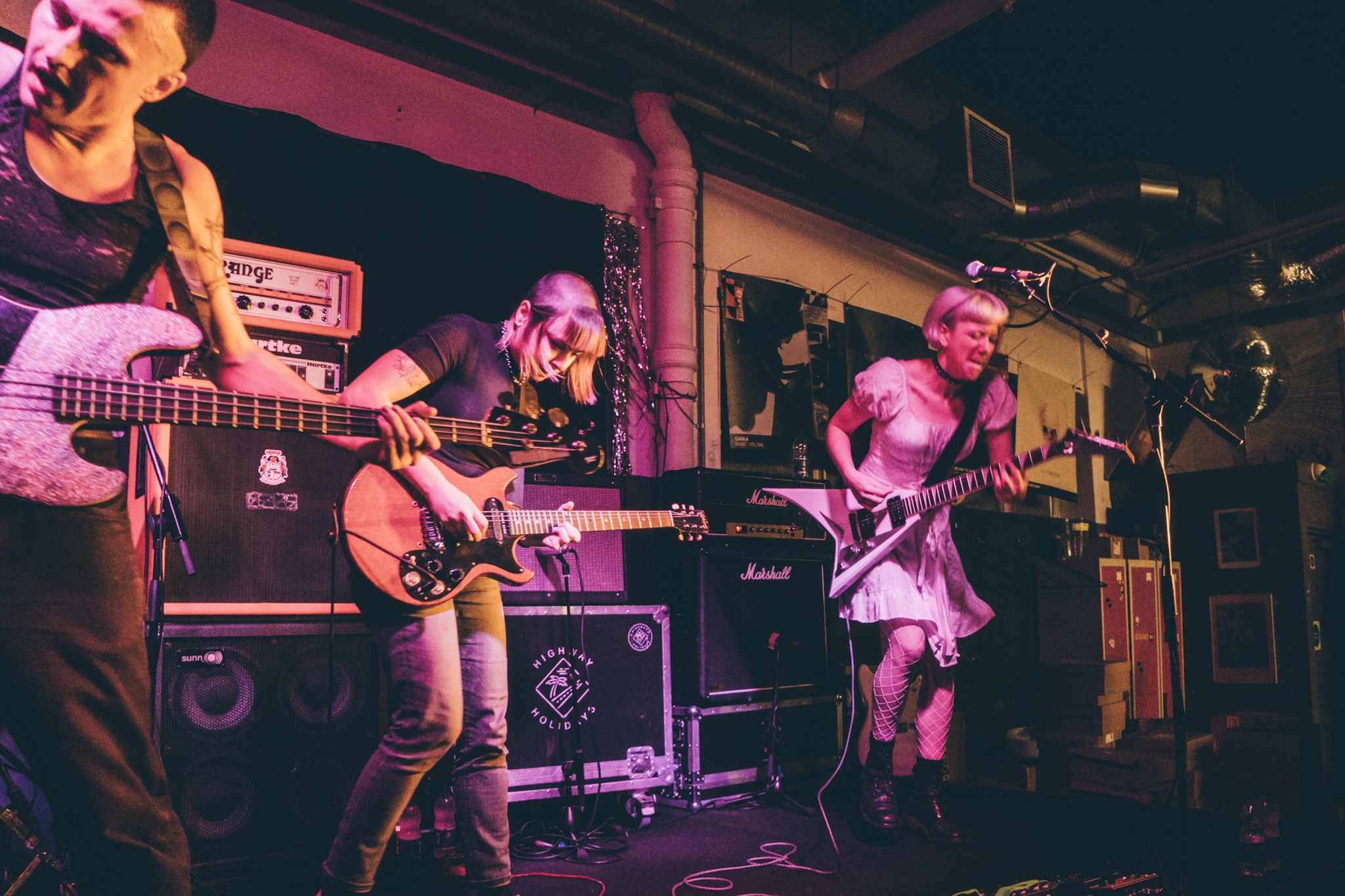
Dilly Dally playing at Rough Trade UK, October 10th 2018

After taking a mental health break, the band got back together in 2017 to write their second full-length record.

Heaven was released on September 14, 2018, by Dine Alone Records in Canada and Partisan Records in the United States and United Kingdom. The songs on this release cover themes such as marijuana use, queerness, depression and substance abuse in the music industry. The album was produced and mixed in Los Angeles by Rob Schnapf.

Heaven was longlisted for the 2019 Polaris Music Prize. The song "Bad Biology" was a finalist for the SOCAN Songwriting Prize in 2019.

=== Final shows and breakup (2020–2023) ===
Dilly Dally had shows announced for 2020, but the COVID-19 pandemic forced the cancellation of tours and festivals worldwide.

Dilly Dally opened for the band My Chemical Romance for several dates in 2022.

On March 2, 2023, the band announced they were breaking up, saying "It's time for us to move forward and continue our journeys separately." They released their last two singles, "Colour of Joy" and "Morning Light", and announced the date for their final concert on May 27 at Lee's Palace in Toronto. A second show was announced for the next night on March 7.

== Personal lives ==
The band is outspoken in their support of queer issues. Monks is queer.

The song "Sober Motel" was written by Monks in relation to Annie’s journey into sobriety.

== Discography ==
"Self-Titled EP"

- Released: 2010
- Label: Self-released

"Next Gold"

- Released: 2013
- Label: Self-released

"Candy Mountain"

- Released: 2014
- Format: 7"
- Label: Buzz (Canada), Fat Possum (United States)
- Tracks: "Candy Mountain", "Green"

Sore

- Released: October 9, 2015
- Label: Buzz (Canada), Partisan (United States & United Kingdom)
- Tracks: "Desire", "Ballin Chain", "Snakehead", "The Touch", "Next Gold", "Purple Rage", "Get to You", "Witch Man", "Green", "Ice Cream", "Burned by the Cold"

Heaven

- Released: September 14, 2018
- Label: Partisan
- Tracks: "I Feel Free", "Doom", "Believe", "Sober Motel", "Sorry Ur Mad", "Marijuana", "Pretty Cold", "Bad Biology", "Heaven"
