= Rare & Unreleased =

Compilation album by Swamp Terrorists
- Released: January 12, 1999
- Studio: Combat Shock Studio (Bern, CH)
- Genre: Industrial
- Length: 73:59
- Label: Metropolis

Swamp Terrorists chronology
Five in Japan (1997)	Rare & Unreleased (1999)

Professional ratings
Review scores
Source	Rating
Allmusic	3/5 stars

Rare & Unreleased is a compilation album by Swamp Terrorists, released on January 12, 1999, by Metropolis Records.

== Track listing ==
All tracks are written by Michael Antener and Ane Hebeisen, except "Dicksmoker" by Teho Teardo

No.	Title	Remixer(s)	Length
1.	"Pale Torment" (Convert Single Rmx)	Swamp Terrorists	4:23
2.	"Scodrom"		5:03
3.	"Liberator" (Dub Mix)	Swamp Terrorists	3:36
4.	"Cynic Forage" (Rmx)	Swamp Terrorists	4:51
5.	"Rebelshade"		3:36
6.	"Old Greyhound"		2:56
7.	"Suck My Brain"	DJ Killroy	6:05
8.	"Dicksmoker (Dubhead)" (Meathead cover)	Swamp Terrorists	5:19
9.	"Hit Em" (Justness Mix)	Swamp Terrorists	4:17
10.	"Right Here" (Medium)		4:55
11.	"Seduction"		4:18
12.	"Remain Firm"		2:43
13.	"Introvert"		1:35
14.	"Get O." (Twisted Mix)	Swamp Terrorists	5:41
15.	"Green Poison" (Dublood Rmx)	Swamp Terrorists	5:12
16.	"Scodrom" (Dubsuck)	Swamp Terrorists	9:31

== Personnel ==
Adapted from the Rare & Unreleased liner notes.

Swamp Terrorists

- Michael Antener (as STR) – programming
- Ane Hebeisen (as Ane H.) – lead vocals

Additional musicians

- Klaus Röthlisberger – recording (6, 12)

== Release history ==
Region	Date	Label	Format	Catalog
1999	United States	Metropolis	CD	MET 119
