= Combat Shock (album) =

Studio album by Swamp Terrorists
- Released: 1993
- Studios: Combat Shock Studio (Bern, CH)
- Genre: Industrial
- Length: 77:27
- Label: Alfa International/Contempo
- Producers: DJ Killroy; Iron E.

Swamp Terrorists chronology
Grow – Speed – Injection (1992)	Combat Shock (1993)	The Pale Torment EP (1994)

Alternative cover
- 1994 LP cover

Combat Shock is the third studio album by Swamp Terrorists, released in 1993 by Alfa International and Contempo Records. A music video for "Pale Torment" was produced for four thousand dollars and televised by MTV Brasil and MTV Europe.

== Reception ==
Aiding & Abetting gave Combat Shock a positive review, saying "it's catchy as hell, heavy enough to attract the headbanger and with good enough beats to work in a club." A critic for Keyboard concurred, saying "behind vocalist Ane H.'s snarling and gargling, STR kicks nasty but imaginative sequences" and that "power guitar samples dominate, but the occasional horn stab, light drum hit, or even shuffle beat adds an element of unpredictability to the din." Industrialnation also issued a positive review, crediting the band with achieving a fresh take on a sound that "KMFDM has become so well known for, without sounding like a rip."

== Track listing ==
All tracks are written by Michael Antener and Ane Hebeisen, except "Pale Torment" with lyrics by Fred Werren.

No.	Title	Remixer(s)	Length
1.	"Pale Torment"		3:56
2.	"Cynic Forage"		4:06
3.	"Right Here"		3:44
4.	"Spawn"		4:39
5.	"Come Back"		3:23
6.	"P.T.S.D."		4:29
7.	"Liberator"		3:20
8.	"Pant to Injure"		4:19
9.	"Revelation"		3:39
10.	"Jerks Ever Win"		3:33
11.	"Right Now"	DJ Killroy	14:31
12.	"Come Back" (Edit)		3:23
13.	"P.T.S.D. (Back in Solitude)"		4:25
14.	"Pale Torment" (Hard 12" Mix)	DJ Killroy	6:19
15.	"Cynic Forage" (Unnamed Remix)	DJ Killroy	4:52
16.	"Hit' Em" (Justness Mix)	Giles Keen	4:17

1994 track listing
No.	Title	Remixer(s)	Length
1.	"Pale Torment"		3:56
2.	"Cynic Forage"		4:06
3.	"Right Here"		3:44
4.	"Spawn"		4:39
5.	"Come Back"		3:23
6.	"P.T.S.D."		4:29
7.	"Liberator"		3:20
8.	"Pant to Injure"		4:19
9.	"Revelation"		3:39
10.	"Jerks Ever Win"		3:33
11.	"Right Now"	DJ Killroy	14:31
12.	"Come Back" (Blot Remix)	DJ Killroy	11:35
13.	"Come Back" (Edit)		3:27
14.	"P.T.S.D. (Back in Solitude)"	DJ Killroy	4:27

== Personnel ==
Adapted from the Combat Shock liner notes.

Swamp Terrorists

- Michael Antener (as STR) – programming
- Ane Hebeisen (as Ane H.) – lead vocals, photography

Production and design

- DJ Killroy – production, mixing
- Iron E. – production, mixing
- Stephan Rubli – typesetting
- Sandra S. – photography

== Release history ==
Region	Date	Label	Format	Catalog
1993	Japan	Alfa International/Contempo	CD	ALCB 840
1994	Czech Republic	Master	CD	MR 0010
1994	Germany	Cashbeat	CD	CB 22
1994	Italy	Sub/Mission	CD	cdWHIP002
1994	Portugal	Simbiose	CD	BIO CD 11
1994	United States	Re-Constriction	CD	REC-011
1994	Greece	Elfish	LP	elf 014
