= Five in Japan =

Live album by Swamp Terrorists
- Released: July 18, 1997
- Recorded: November 1996
- Genre: Industrial
- Length: 55:37
- Label: Sub/Mission/Metropolis

Swamp Terrorists chronology
Wreck (1996)	Five in Japan (1997)	Rare & Unreleased (1999)

Five in Japan is a live album by Swamp Terrorists, released on July 18, 1997 by Sub/Mission and Metropolis Records.

== Reception ==
Sonic Boom praised the production of Five in Japan and claimed "overall, the Swampies do an excellent job of sounding very tight live."

== Track listing ==
All tracks are written by Michael Antener and Ane Hebeisen, except "Dicksmoker" by Teho Teardo and "Hardly Wait" by PJ Harvey

No.	Title	Length
1.	"Intro"	4:04
2.	"Wreck" (Meathead cover)	4:59
3.	"Dicksmoker"	4:10
4.	"P.T.S.D."	4:32
5.	"Comeback"	3:26
6.	"Braintrash"	4:23
7.	"Right Here"	3:52
8.	"Get O."	4:33
9.	"Scodrom"	4:41
10.	"Hardly Wait" (PJ Harvey cover)	3:58
11.	"Dive-Right Jab"	4:13
12.	"Pale Torment"	3:56
13.	"Cynic Forage"	4:50

== Personnel ==
Adapted from the Five in Japan liner notes.

Swamp Terrorists

- Michael Antener (as STR) – programming, mastering
- Base-T – bass guitar
- Ane Hebeisen (as Ane H.) – lead vocals, production, mixing, mastering, photography
- Pit Lee – drums
- ND – electronics
- Spring – guitar

Production and design

- Kouhei Amano – recording
- Andre Grandchamp – recording
- Tetsuya Kitamura – recording
- Patrick Marbach – recording
- Hiroaki Maruyama – recording
- Patrick Niederer – recording
- Jens Schwarz – photography

== Release history ==
Region	Date	Label	Format	Catalog
1997	Italy	Sub/Mission	CD	WHIP026
1997	United States	Metropolis	CD	MET 049
