= Grow – Speed – Injection =

Studio album by Swamp Terrorists
- Released: March 1992
- Studio: Various: Factory Studios; (Verona, ITL); Red Mountain Studio; (Bergamo, ITL)
- Genre: Industrial
- Length: 47:37
- Label: Machinery
- Producer: Michael Antener; Ane Hebeisen

Swamp Terrorists chronology
Grim – Stroke – Disease (1991)	Grow – Speed – Injection (1992)	Combat Shock (1993)

Professional ratings
Review scores
Source	Rating
Allmusic	4.5/5 stars
Music from the Empty Quarter	Positive

Grow – Speed – Injection is the second studio album by Swamp Terrorists, released in March 1992 by Machinery Records.

== Track listing ==
All tracks are written by Michael Antener and Ane Hebeisen, except "Green Blood" with lyrics co-written by Charles Baudelaire

No.	Title	Length
1.	"Ratskin"	4:33
2.	"Hidden (Crab!)"	4:25
3.	"The Vault I"	1:34
4.	"Skizzo Pierce"	4:37
5.	"Rebuff!"	4:05
6.	"The Vault II"	1:10
7.	"Green Blood"	3:59
8.	"Braintrash"	4:20
9.	"The Vault III"	1:37
10.	"Rawhead"	2:51
11.	"S·S·M"	4:28
12.	"Drop the Dig"	3:52

CD bonus tracks
No.	Title	Length
13.	"Ratskin" (Float Mix)	4:33
14.	"Drip the Dog"	1:35

== Personnel ==
Adapted from the Grow – Speed – Injection liner notes.

Swamp Terrorists

- Michael Antener (as STR) – electronics, programming, design, recording and mixing (9)
- Ane Hebeisen (as Ane H.) – lead vocals, photography, design

Production and design

- Jor Jenka (as Jor) – executive-producer
- Ludwig – design
- Sandra S. – photography
- Klaus Röthlisberger – recording and mixing (9)
- Hans Ulrich – recording, mixing, mastering

== Release history ==
Region	Date	Label	Format	Catalog
1992	Germany	Machinery	CD, LP	MA 9
1992	United States	Noise	CD, CS	0-3612-44848
