= Heaven (Dilly Dally album) =

Studio album by Dilly Dally
- Released: September 14, 2018
- Genre: Alternative rock; indie rock
- Length: 34:12
- Label: Partisan
- Producer: Rob Schnapf

Dilly Dally chronology
Sore (2015)	Heaven (2018)

Singles from Heaven
- 1. "I Feel Free" Released: June 26, 2018; 2. "Sober Motel" Released: August 8, 2018; 3. "Doom" Released: September 6, 2018

Professional ratings
Aggregate scores
Source	Rating
Metacritic	82/100
Review scores
Source	Rating
The 405	8/10
Clash	7/10
DIY	4/5 stars
Exclaim!	8/10
MusicOMH	4/5 stars
NME	4/5 stars
Pitchfork	7.8/10
The Skinny	4/5 stars

Heaven is the second and final studio album by Canadian alternative rock band Dilly Dally. It was released on September 14, 2018, by Partisan Records in the United States and United Kingdom, and by Dine Alone Records in Canada.

== Production ==
The album was recorded in Los Angeles, California with producer Rob Schnapf. The album came about during a time when the band were close to quitting, not long after their non-stop tour schedule after their debut album release in 2015.

== Release ==
On June 26, 2018, Dilly Dally announced the release of their second studio album, along with the first single "I Feel Free". Of the single, vocalist Enda Monks said: "This song is me asking my bandmates to let go of what’s been weighing us down. We’re not going to let the past hold us back from our dreams. Let's do this thing."

The second single "Sober Motel" was released on August 8, 2018. Monks explained the single "is a celebration of sobriety, in the midst of an industry that is anything but. I wrote it in a motel bathroom after taking a mystical shower alone. There was something really pure about it all."

The third single "Doom" was released on September 6, 2018.

The fourth single "Marijuana" was released on November 13, 2018. The title of the track came about with the legalization of marijuana in Canada, with Monks' explaining "We’ve been inhaling so much fear and hate from our televisions, our leaders, social media. I don’t know about you, but the anxiety and eventual depression became overbearing. The only way I could keep functioning, and get through writing this record, was with some assistance from weed. Basically, if I didn’t write anything good by sun down - I would smoke sativa for good measure. It would clear my creative pathways, help me forget about the expectations of others, and almost hide away in my own protective energy field."

== Tour ==
In support of the album, the band went on tour, starting on September 7, 2018, in Minneapolis, Minnesota and finishing on November 2, 2018, at Fox Oakland Theatre in Oakland, California. In November 2018, further announcements of the tour were announced from March 19, 2019, to April 20, 2019.

== Critical reception ==
Heaven was met with "universal acclaim" reviews from critics. At Metacritic, which assigns a weighted average rating out of 100 to reviews from mainstream publications, this release received an average score of 82 based on 9 reviews. Aggregator Album of the Year gave the release an 80 out of 100 based on a critical consensus of 16 reviews.

Andy Johnston of The 405 explained: "For an album that’s purportedly all about hope and positivity, Heaven is an almost oppressively heavy listen. The full-blooded energy and youthful, lascivious abandon of the band’s 2015 debut, Sore, is present only in trace elements, replaced by a palpably depressive, inescapably doom-laden mood, punctuated only briefly by bursts of light." Ava Muir of Exclaim! explained: "While Sore was a ferocious and sludgy monster, Heaven feels tamer—a sturdy shoulder to lean on rather than mosh your pent-up rage to. Amidst hazy guitar riffs, melodic bass tones, and the frequent swap of Katie Monks' vocals from her distinctively raspy howl to more subdued singing, Heaven manifests as its own beast entirely."

The release got ranked at Number 32 on Exclaim!'s Top 50 Canadian Albums of the 2010s.

=== Accolades ===
Accolades for Heaven
Publication	Accolade	Rank
PopMatters	Top 70 Albums of 2018	66
Uproxx	Top 50 Albums of 2018	47
Upset Magazine	Top 50 Albums of 2018	25

== Track listing ==
Heaven track listing
No.	Title	Length
1.	"I Feel Free"	3:40
2.	"Doom"	3:55
3.	"Believe"	4:22
4.	"Sober Motel"	3:48
5.	"Sorry Ur Mad"	3:41
6.	"Marijuana"	4:10
7.	"Pretty Cold"	2:38
8.	"Bad Biology"	4:43
9.	"Heaven"	3:15

== Personnel ==
Band Members

- Enda Monks – guitar, vocals
- Liz Ball – guitar
- Jimmy Tony – bass
- Benjamin Reinhartz – drums

Production

- Rob Schnapf – producer, mixer
- Brian Rosemeyer – engineer
- Mark Chalecki – mastering
- Vanessa Heins – photography
