= Dhoomam (1985 film) =

- Directed by: Chandrasekharan Thampi
- Written by: Ashokapuram Narayanan
- Screenplay by: Ashokapuram Narayanan
- Starring: O. P. Pillai; M. P. Jose; Sureshbabu; K. K. Kurup
- Cinematography: Moosa Ameeruddeen
- Edited by: Chandrasekharan Thampi
- Production company: Kalakshethra Cine Arts
- Distributed by: Kalakshethra Cine Arts
- Release date: 1985
- Country: India
- Language: Malayalam

Dhoomam is a 1985 Indian Malayalam film, directed by Chandrasekharan Thampi. The film stars O. P. Pillai, M. P. Jose, Sureshbabu and K. K. Kurup in the lead roles.

== Cast ==
- O. P. Pillai
- M. P. Jose
- Sureshbabu
- K. K. Kurup
- P. P. Sivadas
- P. I. Chandrasekharan
- Jaya
- Leela
- Valsa James
- Gopakumar
- Ammini
