= Wreck (EP) =

EP by Swamp Terrorists
- Released: April 10, 1996
- Studio: Combat Shock Studio (Bern, CH)
- Genre: Industrial
- Length: 66:44
- Label: Sub/Mission/Metropolis

Swamp Terrorists chronology
| Killer (1996) | Wreck (1996) | Five in Japan (1997) |

Wreck is an EP by Swamp Terrorists, released on April 10, 1996 by Sub/Mission and Metropolis Records.

== Reception ==
Sonic Boom gave Wreck a mixed review, saying "for the most part this album would only appeals to completists and diehard fans since all of the material exists in its original form elsewhere."

== Track listing ==
All tracks are written by Michael Antener and Ane Hebeisen.

| No. | Title | Remixer(s) | Length |
|---|---|---|---|
| 1. | "Wreck" (Scarred) | Michael Antener | 4:15 |
| 2. | "Dive-Right Jab" (Cranked Up) | Sascha Konietzko | 3:31 |
| 3. | "Shape Draw Back" | | 5:46 |
| 4. | "Wreck" (US-Version) | | 4:59 |
| 5. | "Doom" | DJ Killroy | 4:24 |
| 6. | "Try My Flesh" | | 4:10 |
| 7. | "Suck My Brain" | DJ Killroy | 4:07 |
| 8. | "Cancer Killer" | | 2:40 |
| 9. | "Dive-Right Jab (Til You Drop)" | Sascha Konietzko | 4:23 |
| 10. | "Wreck" (Scarred Long) | Michael Antener | 6:24 |
| 11. | "Shape of Rage" (Repaired Process Dub) | Swamp Terrorists | 4:15 |
| 12. | "Doubting Idol" (Cobbler!) | DJ Killroy | 3:31 |
| 13. | "Wreck" (Of Suspicion Dance Mix) | Swamp Terrorists | 5:46 |
| 14. | "Shape of Rage" (Bonus Beats) | Swamp Terrorists | 4:59 |

== Personnel ==
Adapted from the Wreck liner notes.

Swamp Terrorists

- Michael Antener (as STR) – programming, cover art
- Ane Hebeisen (as Ane H.) – lead vocals, illustrations

Additional musicians

- Andrea – additional vocals (1)
- Sascha Konietzko – programming (9)

== Release history ==
| Region | Date | Label | Format | Catalog |
|---|---|---|---|---|
| 1996 | Italy | Sub/Mission | CD | WHIP024 |
| 1996 | United States | Metropolis | CD | MET 018 |
