= Pieter de Jode I =

Flemish printmaker

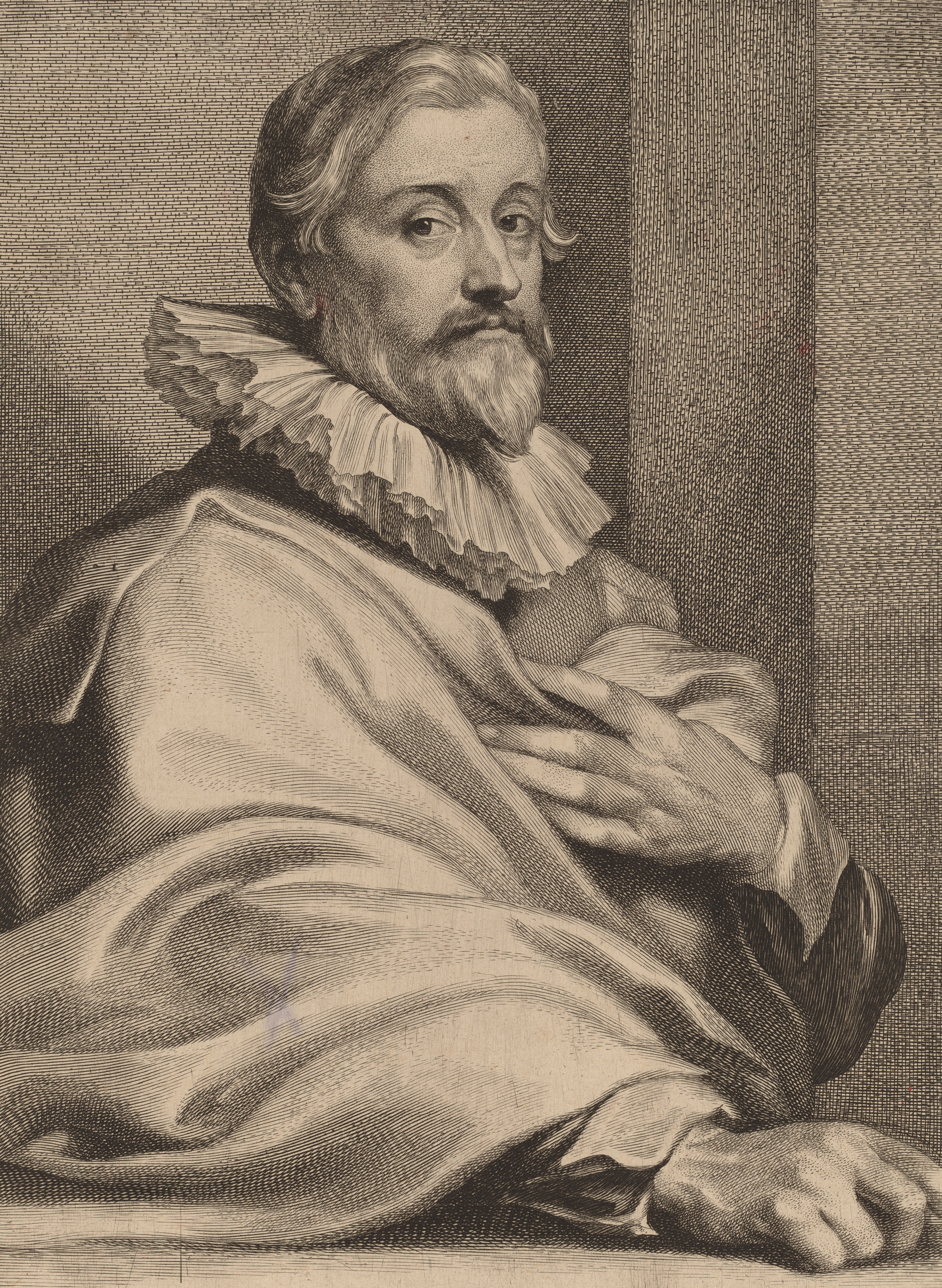
- Pieter de Jode I after Anthony van Dyck
- Born: 1570; Antwerp
- Died: 1634 (aged 63–64); Antwerp
- Known for: Engraving, drawing

Petrus, or Pieter de Jode I or Pieter de Jode the Elder (Note: Also known as Petrus de Jode) (1570 – 9 August 1634), was a Flemish printmaker, draughtsman, publisher and painter principally active in Antwerp. He was active as a reproductive artist who created many prints after the works of leading painters and was in addition a prolific designer of prints for Antwerp publishers.

== Life ==
Pieter de Jode was born in Antwerp as the son of the prominent Dutch-born map maker Gerard de Jode. He received his initial training in the techniques of drawing and engraving from his father. He later studied with Hendrik Goltzius in Haarlem. In the early 1590s he was active in Amsterdam. He then travelled to Italy.

In Rome in the 1590s he made engravings after works by Titian, Giulio Romano and Jacopo Bassano. His engravings of Italian master paintings became a source for Karel van Mander. He also spent time in Venice as is documented on a suite of engravings after designs by Maerten de Vos which he made in Venice and was published by Crispijn de Passe.

He travelled back home and in 1599 he became a master in the Guild of Saint Luke in Antwerp. In 1631 he travelled to Paris.

He was the teacher of his son Pieter de Jode II, Pieter de Bailliu, Johan Caspar Dooms, Pieter Perret and Nicolaes Ryckmans.

== Work ==
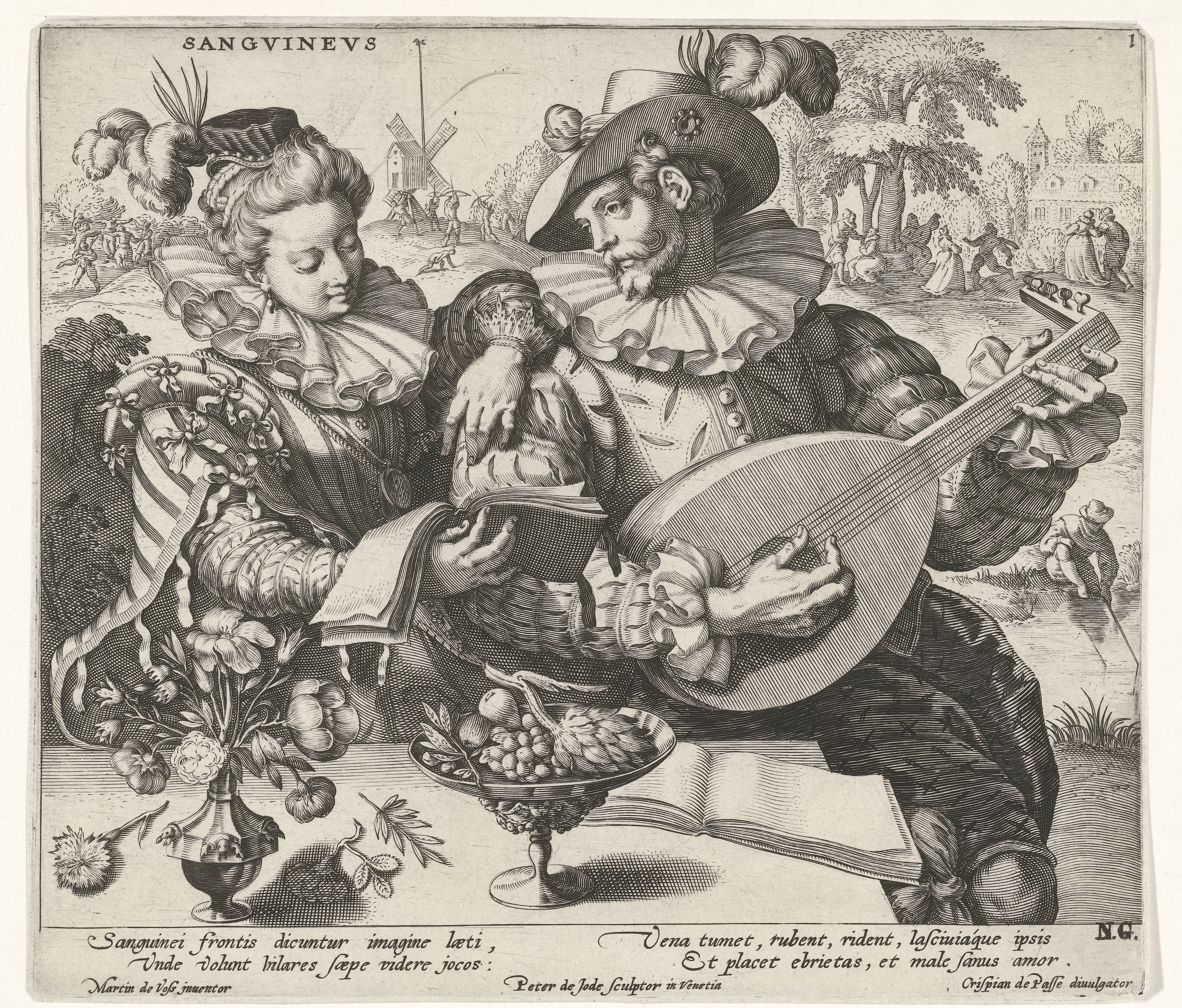
The four temperaments, Sangvinevs after Maerten de Vos

Pieter de Jode the Elder initially made engravings after Bartholomäus Spranger, which show the influence of his master Hendrik Goltzius. This influence was evident in his spirited, disciplined and technically sophisticated engraving technique.

During his stay in Italy he mainly engraved after the works of leading Italian painters such as Titian, Jacopo Bassano, Giulio Romano, Annibale Carracci, Francesco Vanni and others and the influence of Goltzius became less pronounced. Upon his return to Antwerp he produced engravings after designs of Sebastiaen Vrancx, Otto van Veen, Anthony van Dyck and Peter Paul Rubens.

He also created original designs for the publishing projects of Antwerp engravers.
