= Jan Gaspar Dooms =

Flemish draftsman and copperplate engraver (1597-1675)

- Born: Caspar Dooms; 6 March 1597; Antwerp
- Died: 1675 (aged 77–78); Prague
- Education: Pieter de Jode I
- Known for: drawings, engravings

Jan Gaspar Dooms (6 March 1597 Antwerp – 1675 Prague) was a Flemish draftsman and copperplate engraver active in Prague.

== Life ==
Jan Gaspar came from the family of Antwerp painter Gaspar Doomer, baptismal record says he was a son of Joost Dooms and Anna van Wijck. In Antwerp Dooms studied in workshop of Pieter de Jode I. Around 1620 he moved to Prague New town, where he bought a house from Pavel Lhotský z Libětína in street V Jirchářích in 1650. In the record, he is named as Doomer from Pomerale or Pomeren. Together with his son obtained town privileges in 1651. Jan Gaspar had a wife named Anna. It's possible, that his family cooperated or done some of the works attributed to him because Dooms's signature is changing. Some sources mention his son Gaspar, other mentions Jan. Thanks to little competition, he became a popular engraver of portraits and figural motifs already in the 1620s. Based on the signature sculpsit Kuttenbergae Gaspar Dooms on the engraving from 1658, it is clear that Dooms stayed in Kutná Hora for some time. There was also another engraver Josef Calasancius Dooms active in Prague, but his relation to Jan Gaspar is unknown.

== Work ==
Dooms created most of his copperplate engraving after his own drawings. However he engraved also motives after painter Karel Škréta, as the oldest example can be polemic book with author's portrait in Dioikésis hoc est Moderamen differentiarum juris communis (Prague 1664) by Jan Jindřich Proškovský. Few theses were illustrated by engravings by Dooms after models of Škréta. The best example of cooperation with Škréta can be considered a cycle of 37 copperplate engravings from the life of Saint Adalbert of Prague for book Rosa Boemica sive Vita sancti Woytiechi (Praha 1668) by Matěj Benedikt Bolelucký z Hradiště. Dooms engraved also frontispiece after model of unknown draftsman Gregor Rolle for book Předrahý poklad pokladnice Českého království, to jest Přemilá … s. Barbora (Prague 1670). Dooms as well just drew up few models realised in the engraving by another Antwerp artist Jan Adriaen Gerhardt de Groos, for example, author's portrait in Phosphorus septicornis (Prague 1673) by Tomáš Pešina z Čechorodu.

As his first work can be considered the portrait of Ferdinand II. in Explanatio huius picturae auferibilitatem Ferdinandi II. (Prague 1621) by Michal Pěčka z Radostic. His other artworks are engravings of allegories in Satyrarum liber prior (Prague 1622) by Michal Pěčka z Radostic, portrait of the author of the publication in Kalendář hospodářský a kancelářský … k létu Páně 1625 (Prague c. 1624) by Daniel Basilius de Deutschenberg, portrait of Ferdinand III. in Sláva nejstarožitnějšího Arcidomu rakouského na každý den přes celý rok vysvětlená (Prague 1635) by Nicolaus Vernulaeus, devotional picture (Vera effigies) of Saint Ludmila (1637), portrait of canon Šimon Brosius z Horsteina (1641), Virgin Mary with kneeling Carmelite in Provázek trojnásobný (Prague 1644), engraving of title page and four portraits of emperors Ferdinand I. to Ferdinand IV., most likely after Frans Bruyn in Ferdinandi I. II. III. IV. Universitatis Ferdinandeae Pragensis Soc. Iesu Pythagorae quaternio (Prague 1650). Doom's also made a depictions of Saint Thomas Aquinas (1652), Saint Francis Borgia (1672), Saint Mercurius in Thesaurus in Lucem Protractus, Sive S. Mercurius (Prague 1675) by Pěšina, Saint Clement or Maria Electa, portrait of abbot Matouš Ferdinand Sobek z Bílenberka (1667), blessed Angela of Brixen in S. Ursulae Ehr und Preysß oder S. Ursulae … Leben und glorwürdiger Marterkampff (Prague 1669), depiction of Cosmas and Damian in Triumphus vitae coelestis et terrestris aeternae et temporalis ... tutelario Cosmae et Damiani (Prague 1669), two portraits of members of Martinic family in Kurz begriffener Außzug der verneuerten Lands-Ordnung (Prague 1671) by Johann Jacob von Weingarten, portrait of canon Michal Vojtěch Crusius z Krausenberka (1672), author's portrait in Horlivé předložení a jistě užitečné cvičení (Prague 1672) by Michal Vojtěch Krusius z Krausenberku, series of eleven saints in Koruna česká, to jest Pěkné a nábožné modlitby (Prague 1673) by Jan Ignác Dlouhoveský z Dlouhé Vsi, portrait of Martinic in Fürsten-Spiegel (Prague 1673) by Weingarten, allegory with four saints in Poušť svatomila, to jest Pravidlo (Prague 1674) by Paul de Barry, frontispis with figure of saint in Thesaurus in lucem protractus sive S. Mercurius, maximus orientis martyr (Prague c. 1674) by Tomáš Pešina z Čechorodu or at least one portrait of saint in Thesaurus absconditus. … Verbogener geistlicher Schatz der königl. Haupt-Kirchen des Ertz-Stiffts St. Viti zu Prag (Prague 1680) by Jan Ignác Dlouhoveský z Dlouhé Vsi. Dooms engraved also for several books while he resided in Kutná Hora, for example frontispieces for several volumes of Zprávy o velikém triumfu ku poctivosti s. Františka Xaveria (Prague 1658) by Franciscus Natolius.

There are also several leaflets attributed to Gaspar Dooms, two leaflets with Defenestration of vice-regents of Bohemia on 23 May 1618 (printed 1619) and a signed leaflet with the Battle of White Mountain and Ferdinand. II. titled Contra Victorem Nulla Est. printed by Thobias Leopoldus in 1621 in Prague.

=== Gallery ===
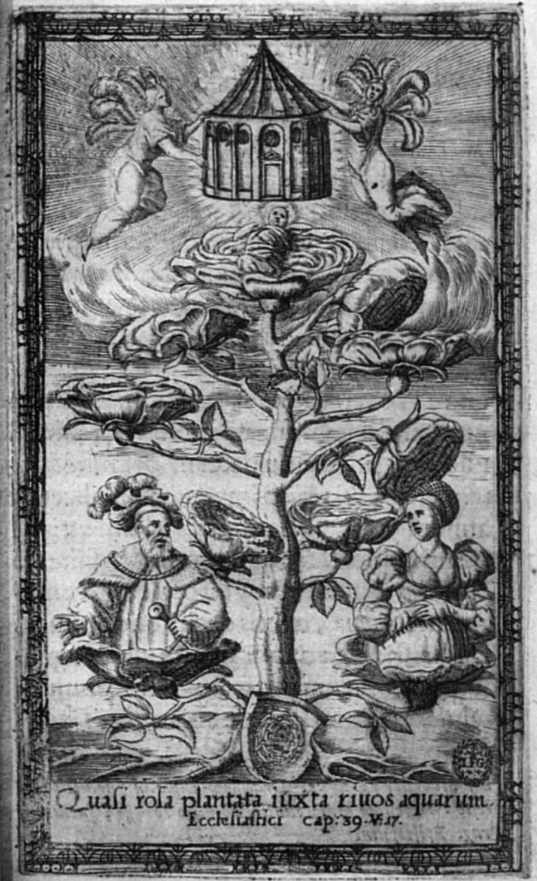
Nascitur purpureus flos in Rosa Boemica (1668), after Karel Škréta

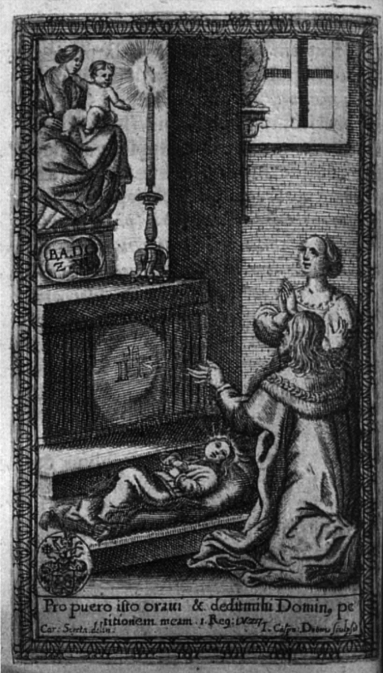
Sick St. Adalbert promised as a child at the altar to the Virgin Mary in Rosa Boemica (1668), after Karel Škréta

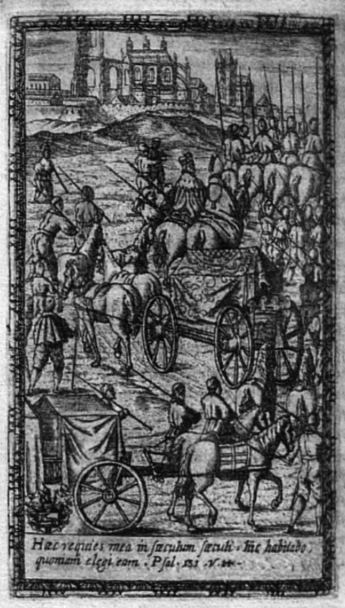
Transport of relics of Saint Adalbert, Radim and Five Brothers to Prague in Rosa Boemica (1668), after Karel Škréta

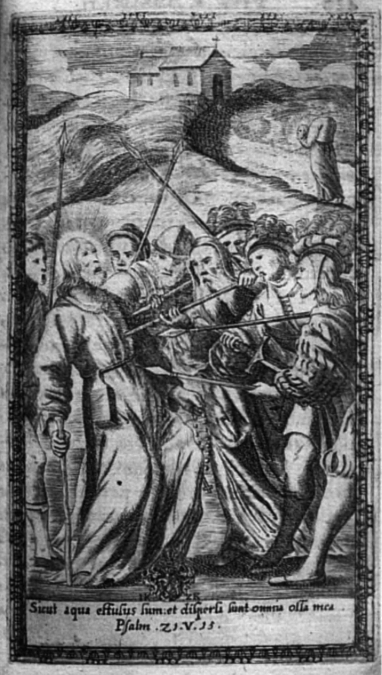
The Passion of St. Adalbert in Rosa Boemica (1668), after Karel Škréta

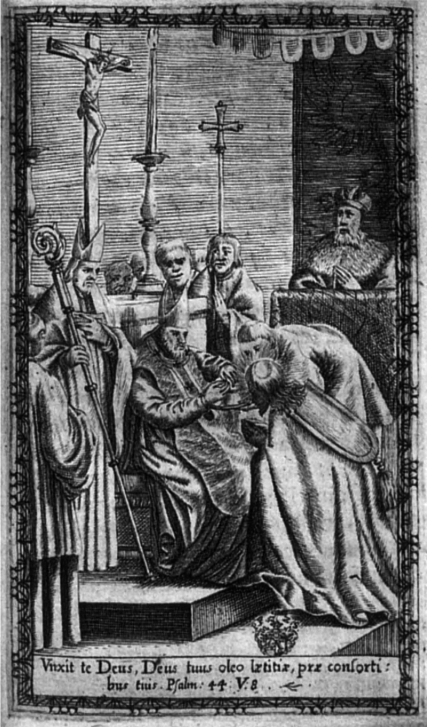
St. Adalbert before Emperor Ota II. in Verona receiving episcopal ordination in Rosa Boemica (1668), after Karel Škréta

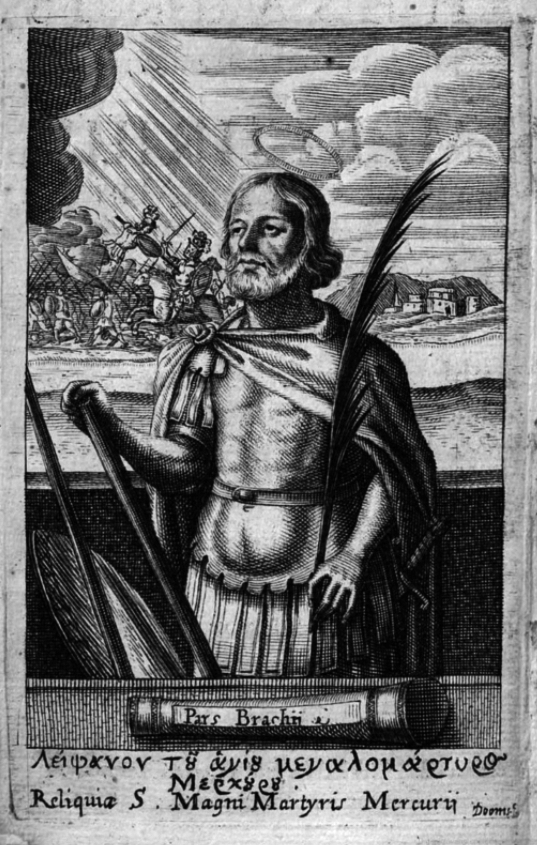
Saint Mercurius in Thesaurus in Lucem Protractus (1675)

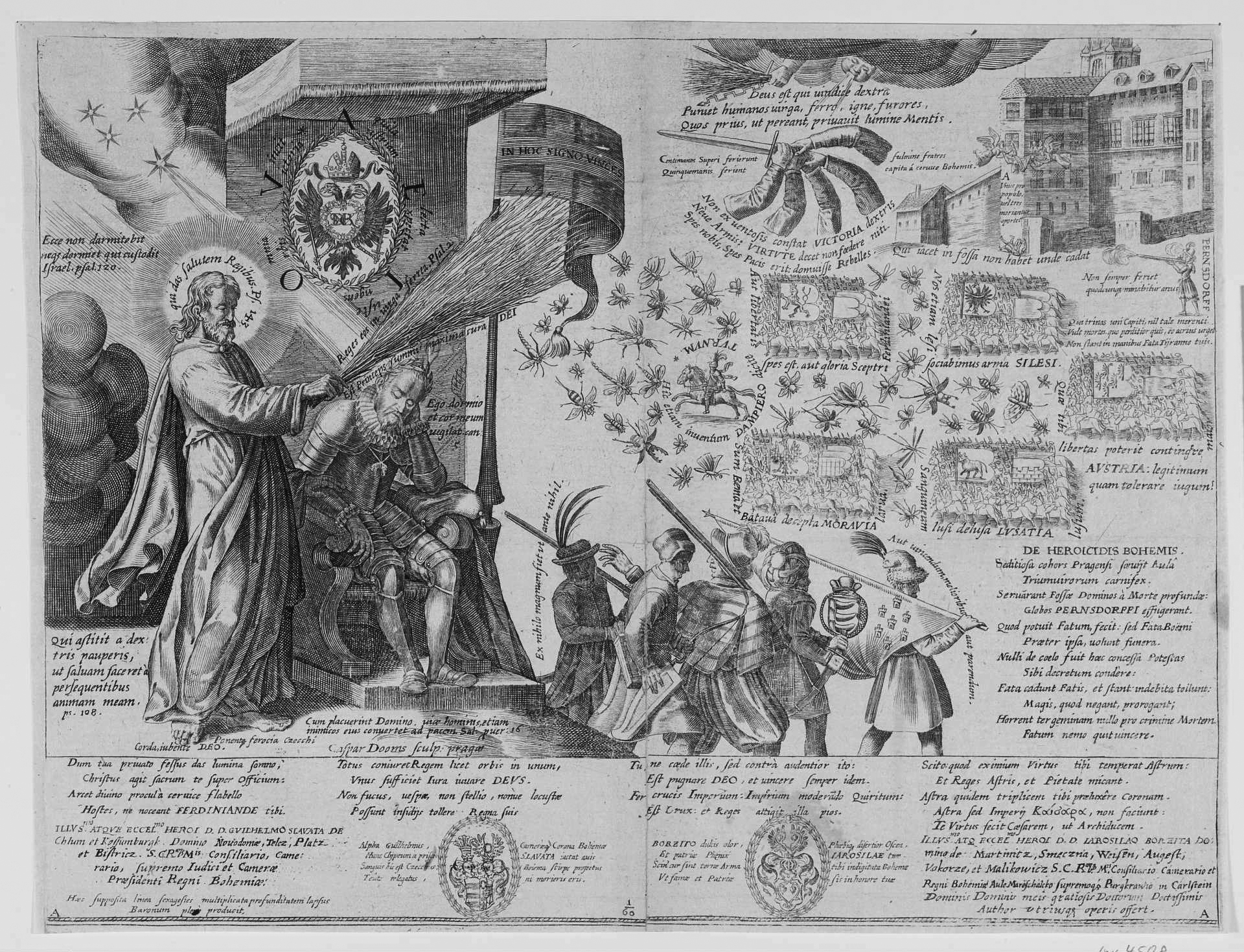
Leaflet Allegory of the beginning of the Thirty Years War (date unknown)

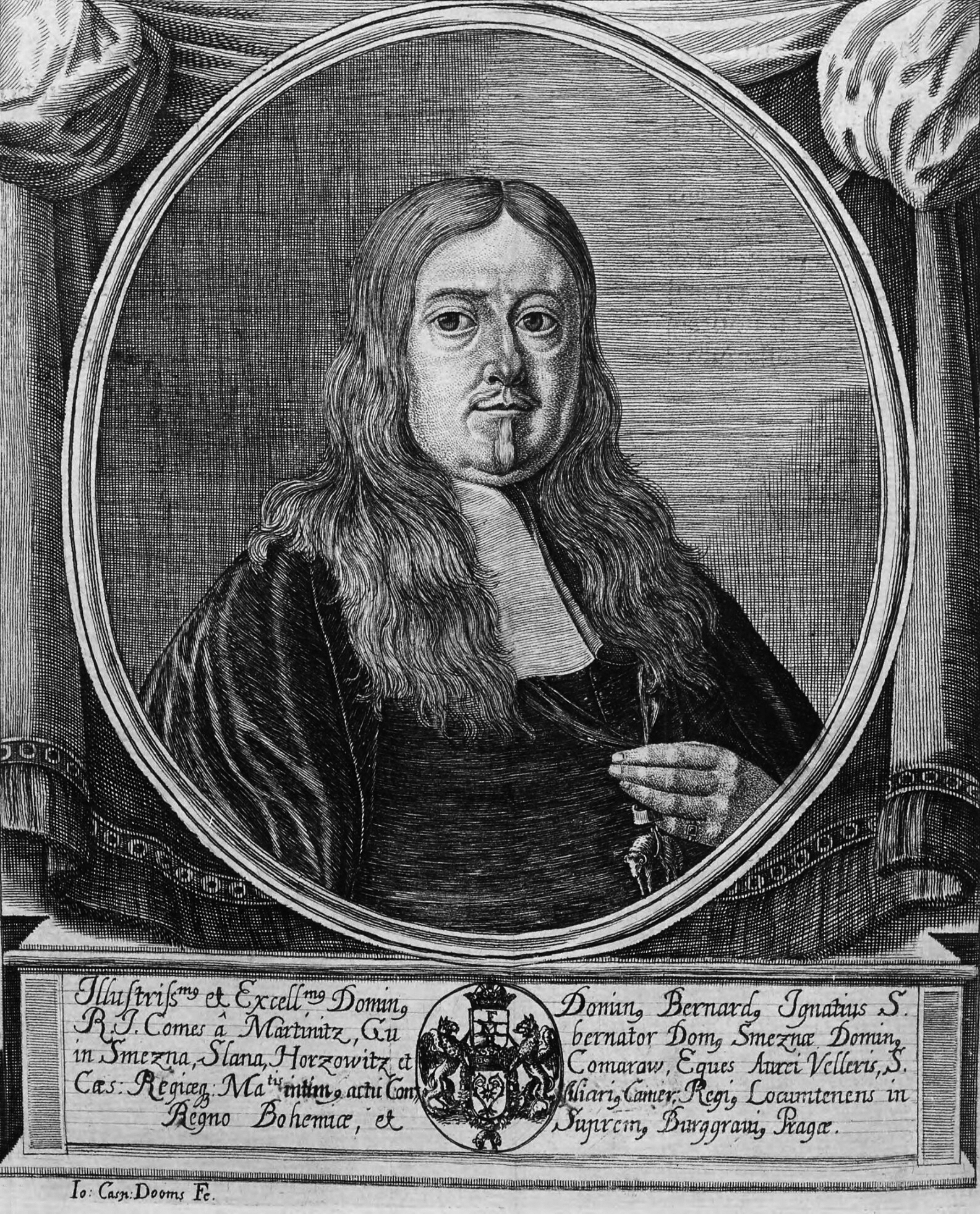
Portrait of Bernard Ignác z Martinic from Kurtz begriffener Außzug der verneuerten Lands- Ordnung (1671)
