= Doomed =

Doomed may refer to:

- "Doomed" (Buffy the Vampire Slayer), a 1999 episode of the television series Buffy the Vampire Slayer
- "Doomed", an episode of the 2006 television series Fantastic Four: World's Greatest Heroes
- Doomed!: The Untold Story of Roger Corman's The Fantastic Four, a 2015 documentary film
- Doomed (novel), a 2013 novel by Chuck Palahniuk
- "Doomed" (Bring Me the Horizon song), 2015
- "Doomed" (Moses Sumney song), 2017
- DoomEd, an editor for the video game Doom
- Doomed, a 1975 performance art piece by Chris Burden
- The Doomed (film), a 1924 German silent drama film
- "The Doomed", a 2017 song by A Perfect Circle

== See also ==
- Doom (disambiguation)
