= Legion of Doom (disambiguation) =

The Legion of Doom is a group of DC Comics supervillains

Legion of Doom may also refer to:

== Film and television ==
- A vigilante group whose activities were dramatized in the 1986 film, Brotherhood of Justice
- "The Legion of Doom" (Legends of Tomorrow), an episode of Legends of Tomorrow

== Sport ==
- Legion of Doom (ice hockey), nickname for a line of Philadelphia Flyers ice hockey players
- Legion of Doom (wrestling), professional wrestling tag team also known as the Road Warriors
- The Legion of Doom, professional wrestling stable including other members besides the Road Warriors, managed by Paul Ellering

== Others ==
- Legion of Doom (hacking), a hacker group
- The Legion of Doom (mash up group), a music production team and electronica group
- "Legion of Doom", a song by Death from the 2016 Scream Bloody Gore reissue
