= ReINVENTION opERATION =

reINVENTION opERATION

Remix album by proGREX.iv
- Released: February 18, 1997
- Recorded: 1996
- Studio: Various: DAMn! Studios; Midimark Studio; (Hollywood, California)
- Genre: Electronic; techno; drum and bass
- Length: 61:10
- Label: Full Contact
- Producer: Mick Hale; George Sarah; vMarkus

reINVENTION opERATION is a remix album by proGREX.iv, released on February 18, 1997, by Full Contact Records. proGREX.iv is a collaborative project between Mick Hale and vMarkus from Crocodile Shop with George Sarah of THC that features contributions from anGee, Sarah Folkman of Geko, Jared Hendrickson of Chemlab and Mitsy Larkin.

== Music ==
The album partially consists of tracks from Consenting Guinea Pig by T.H.C. and The True Creator by D!v!s!on #9 that have been remixed by the band. An edited version of the track "reINVENTiNG SLEEP" (electroBODYmixx) titled "reInventing sLeep" (electroBodyedit) appeared on Awake the Machines - On the Line Vol. 2 by Out of Line and Sub/Mission Records.

== Reception ==
The online magazine Sonic Boom had previously reviewed T.H.C.'s Consenting Guinea Pig and D!v!s!on #9's The True Creator, accusing the former for being "nothing altogether new or innovative" and the latter's "bland bass and percussion" of transforming the album into a "common collection of insipidly derivative material." Sonic Boom wrote a negative review for reINVENTION opERATION as well and said "in essence this eclectic collection of Drum'n'Bass, Trance, and other more experimental beat driven electronics, is no more than regurgitated music."

== Track listing ==
No.	Title	Lyrics	Music	Length
1.	"doesn'tMATTER" (noMIND mixx)	Mitsy Larkin	Mick Hale; vMarkus	5:00
2.	"reINVENTiON" (drum'N'BASSmixx)	Mick Hale; Jared Hendrickson	Hale; vMarkus	3:56
3.	"needtoDESTROY" (somethingNUmixx)	Sarah Folkman	Hale; vMarkus	5:11
4.	"pale BLUE decision" (dedi_CATEDmixx)	anGEE	Hale	5:27
5.	"reINVENTiNG SLEEP" (electroBODYmixx)	Hale	George Sarah	6:30
6.	"fallDOWN" (greenCONGRESSmixx)		Sarah	5:26
7.	"islam" (ironHORST/MiNGAmixx)		Hale; vMarkus	3:01
8.	"need LOVE" (paleDECISIONmixx)		Sarah	5:53
9.	"truCREATORZ" (subGRAViTYmixx)		Hale; vMarkus	4:20
10.	"every BODY" (plumbersCRACKmixx)		Sarah	7:13
11.	"twistedSKY" (chemBRAiNmixx)	Hendrickson	Hale	9:13

== Personnel ==
Adapted from the reINVENTION opERATION liner notes.

proGREX.iv

- Mick Hale – instruments, production, vocals (5), sampler (6, 8, 10)
- George Sarah – instruments, production, mixing (3, 5, 6, 8, 10), remixer (6, 8, 10)
- vMarkus – instruments, production, vocals (2)

Additional performers

- anGEE – vocals (4)
- Sarah Folkman – vocals (3, 5)
- Jared Hendrickson – vocals (2, 11)
- Mitsy Larkin – vocals (1)

Production and design

- Dance Assembly Music Network (DAMn!) – design
- Alan Douches – mastering
- Zalman Fishman – executive-producer

== Release history ==
Region	Date	Label	Format	Catalog
United States	1997	Full Contact	CD	9868–63251
