= ProGREX.iv =

Electronic music project

proGREX.iv
- Origin: New Brunswick, Canada
- Genres: Electronic
- Years active: 1996–1997
- Label: Full Contact
- Past members: Mick Hale

proGREX.iv was the name of an electronic music project founded by composer Mick Hale and based in New Brunswick. Hale released one studio album, titled reINVENTION opERATION, under the name in 1997 for Full Contact Records.

== History ==
proGREX.iv was created as a collaborative project in 1996 by Mick Hale and vMarkus from Crocodile Shop and George Sarah of THC with the intention of releasing a collaborative effort for Cleopatra Records. In 1997 the supergroup released reINVENTION opERATION on Full Contact Records. It featured guest contributions from Sarah Folkman of Geko and Jared Hendrickson of Chemlab. The album comprises remixed tracks utilized music from Consenting Guinea Pig by T.H.C. and The True Creator by D!v!s!on #9. and The True Creator by D!v!s!on #9. The band covered "Don't Speak" by No Doubt for the 1997 Fifth Colvmn Records various artists compilation World War Underground. An edited version of the track "reINVENTiNG SLEEP" (electroBODYmixx) titled "reInventing sLeep" (electroBodyedit) appeared on Awake the Machines - On the Line Vol. 2 by Out of Line and Sub/Mission Records. The online magazine Sonic Boom criticized the source material for being lackluster and that the low quality of the proGREX.iv collaboration signaled the end of Fifth Colvmn Records, which would go bankrupt that year.

== Discography ==
Studio albums

- reINVENTION opERATION (1997, Full Contact)
