= Death by design (disambiguation) =

Death by Design, is a 1943 British mystery film.

Death by Design may refer also refer to:

- Batman: Death by Design, a graphic novel by Chip Kidd and Dave Taylor
- Death by Design, a crime novel by Barbara Nadel
- "Death by Design", an episode of Betrayed
- "Death by Design", an episode of Diagnosis Murder
- Death by Design: Capital Punishment As a Social Psychological System, a book by Craig Haney
- Death by Design: A Comedy with Murder, a play by Rob Urbinati
- Death by Design: The Life and Times of Life and Times, a documentary about cell biology, also known as Death by Design: Where Parallel Worlds Meet
- Death by Design, an album by T.H.C.

== See also ==
- Death's Design, an album by Blakkheim
- Design for Death, a 1947 documentary
