= Chris Collins (American musician) =

American musician

- Genres: Rock, power pop, garage punk
- Years active: 1982–present
- Labels: New Records, Midnight, Cryptovision Records, Get Hip, Makin' Tyme, Synchronic, CC Media
- Website: www.ccmedianet.com

Chris Collins is an American musician, recording engineer and producer, and technologist. His work in the New Jersey and New York City music scene started in the early 1980s when he co-founded the pop-punk/garage band Mod Fun. He founded the CC Media Network in 2006, a multimedia production and promotion company through which he could produce, promote, and release his own music. On December 8, 2020 he released a solo EP titled Good on ya', John – a tribute to John Lennon.

== Music career ==
Collins gained his start in NYC area pop-punk/garage band Mod Fun, formed late in 1982 with his childhood friends Mick Hale and Bob Strete, with whom he had been playing music since 1979. Although he had experimented with songwriting from early on, Collins' primary contribution to Mod Fun was as drummer and backing vocalist. The band released two full-length albums, a 3-song EP and two singles between 1984 and 1987. In addition, they honed their performance skills by playing a heavy schedule of club dates at local NYC & NJ venues and touring in support of their records. Their powerful (and sometimes destructive) live sets garnered the band a reputation as one of the New York area's most exciting acts of the burgeoning garage revival scene.

During that same period, Collins also served as the drummer for New York pop-punk outfit True Colours, which quickly evolved into The Punch Line - a power pop quartet in which the focus was on vocal harmonies and clean production. The Punch Line performed live at a handful of local venues and released one single. The recording sessions for that single, coupled with the break-up of Mod Fun, served as the impetus for Collins' entry into the field of recording engineering.

Collins continued to perform with bands into the early 1990s, playing drums with NYC's The Devil Dogs and, occasionally, with his old friends in The Punch Line. In addition, he played drums, keyboards and a bit of guitar with longtime friends Hale and Strete, who had gone on to form Crocodile Shop – also engineering many of the early recordings for that group. In 1992, after a songwriting deal with Kevin Henneman and Deborah Gibson had fallen through, Collins found himself as the bass player in a short-lived new group featuring Al Scherr of The Incinerators. That act never quite got off the ground, and for several years thereafter Collins refocused his energies on computer technology – doing little in professional music.

Late in 1999, Collins did a brief stint as lead singer and occasional drummer for his brother in The Matt Collins Band – taking over full-time drumming duties a few years later. In addition, a brief reformation of The Punch Line led to a headlining performance and the release of a 10-song CD, which was recorded in Collins' own 40-track digital studio. Collins served as engineer/producer for New York act "4 Miles Out".

In 2004, Collins' first band Mod Fun performed a reunion concert at The Saint in Asbury Park, NJ in celebration of the reissue of their retrospective CD "Past...Forward" by Get Hip Records. The rekindled friendship among the original members and their renewed interest in making music together has led to gigs in cities as far away as Nashville and Chicago as well as the release of a new double-length CD and multiple performances in an around New Jersey and New York.

In 2007 Collins produced his first solo album entitled "Eclectic Blue" for limited release through CC Media Network. After catching the attention of BlowUpRadio DJ "Lazlo" and receiving airplay on his Live365 show, much of his original music from that record was showcased in a low key acoustic performance in early 2008.

In 2009, Collins returned to the studio with his bandmates in Mod Fun to begin the recordings that became the band's new CD "Futurepresent". In addition to handling the drums, percussion, and keyboards on the record, Collins contributed an original track entitled "The Jettison", on which he sings the lead vocal. He also served as recording/mixing engineer for the sessions and assisted with production and mastering.

In 2010, Collins' primary musical project, Mod Fun, went on extended hiatus, so he refocused his energies on music publishing in a venture that would ultimately lead to release of hip-hop artist ERYX first full-length album the following year.

Throughout 2011 and 2012, Collins continued to write original music and occasionally perform/record both as a solo artist and with The Matt Collins Band, as well as promote and publish music through his media company.

In November 2020 CC Media Network announced on Facebook that the first Chris Collins solo work in 13 years was to be released on December 8, 2020. Titled Good on ya', John, the 5-song EP is a tribute to John Lennon. The EP was released on all usual platroms, and a limited-run CD was available free to the first 25 people who donated at least $10 to the Coalition to Stop Gun Violence.

== Other activities ==
Collins attended the Institute of Audio Research in New York, where he earned a diploma in multi-track recording technology and eventually became an instructor under president Al Grundy. At age 20 he was, at the time, the youngest instructor to have ever taught a full course load at the Institute and was an active member of both the AES and SMPTE. Simultaneously, he was working extensively as a freelance recording engineer and live sound reinforcement tech - having provided his services to artists such as Liza Minnelli, Elton John, Kim Simmonds (of Savoy Brown), Crocodile Shop, and others. Home & Studio Recording magazine published a feature article on Collins in its October, 1989 issue. In 1992, he left the Institute of Audio Research.

In 2006, Collins founded "CC Media Network" - a multimedia production and promotion company to serve as a channel through which his music industry releases could be distributed and various live events could be advertised.

Collins is a writer/publisher member of ASCAP.

== Discography ==
=== Singles and EPs ===
- I Am With You b/w Happy Feeling - Mod Fun (single) 1984 New Records
- Hangin' Round - Mod Fun (EP) 1985 Makin' Tyme Records
- Mary Goes 'Round b/w Grounded - Mod Fun (single) 1986 Cryptovision Records
- The Wild Flowers b/w Faster Than I Like - The Punch Line (single) 1987 Synchronic Entertainment
- Measure by Measure - Crocodile Shop (EP) 1989 Susstones Records

=== Albums ===
- 90 Wardour St. - Mod Fun (1985) Midnight Records
- Dorothy's Dream - Mod Fun (1986) Cryptovision Records
- Celebrate The Enemy CD - Crocodile Shop (1994) Tinman Records
- Past Forward CD - Mod Fun (1995) Get Hip Records
- Past Forward CD reissue - Mod Fun (2004) Get Hip Records
- S.E.A. - Self Extracting Archive CD - Crocodile Shop (2004) Danse Assembly Media Network
- ...to get to the other side CD - The Punch Line (2006) Synchronic Entertainment
- Now And Again CD - Mod Fun (2007) Makin' Tyme Records
- Eclectic Blue CD - Chris Collins (2007) CC Media Network
- Futurepresent CD - Mod Fun (2009) Makin' Tyme Records
