= Adagio (T.H.C. album) =

Studio album by T.H.C.
- Released: July 13, 1999
- Genre: trip hop
- Length: 48:27
- Label: Brain Surgery
- Producer: George Sarah

T.H.C. chronology
Consenting Guinea Pig (1996)	Adagio (1999)

Adagio is the second studio album by T.H.C., released on July 13, 1999, by Brain Surgery Music. T.H.C. gained some recognition after the songs "Overfire ", "Dip" and "Need to Destroy" appeared in several of episodes of Buffy the Vampire Slayer and its spin-off Angel. The songs were performed as part of the fictional band Shy, of whom Veruca was the vocalist and composer George Sarah the band's keyboard player.

== Track listing ==
All lyrics are written by Sarah Folkman,; all music is composed by George Sarah.

No.	Title	Length
1.	"Unsaid Warning"	5:25
2.	"Girlflesh"	6:03
3.	"Dip"	5:03
4.	"Darjeeling"	5:46
5.	"Overfire"	5:14
6.	"Need to Destroy"	4:10
7.	"Lonesome"	7:03
8.	"Blue Wave"	6:45
9.	"Adagio"	2:58

Digital issue bonus tracks
No.	Title	Length
10.	"When I Sleep"	6:24
11.	"Un Wave 2"	5:23
12.	"Green Wave"	6:30
13.	"Green Wave" (Roller Rink Mix)	4:43
14.	"Body Electric"	4:46

== Personnel ==
Adapted from the Adagio liner notes.

T.H.C.

- George Sarah – instruments, producer

Additional performers

- Sarah Folkman – vocals (1–3, 5–8), design

Production and design

- Lorraine Kay – cover art, illustrations

== Release history ==
Region	Date	Label	Format	Catalog
United States	1999	Brain Surgery	CD	BSM 8202-2
United States	1999		DL	
