= Anthony Head filmography =

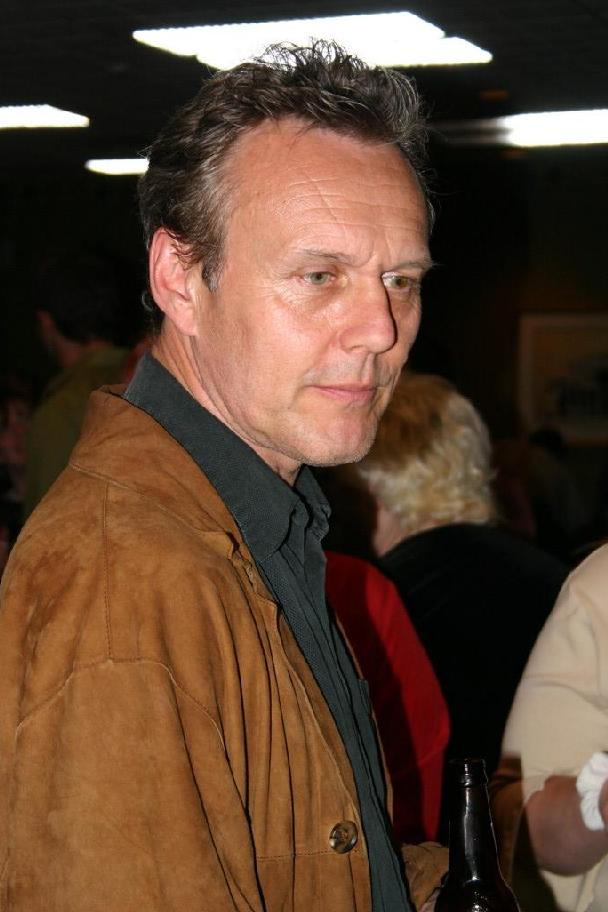
Anthony Head in 2005

Anthony Stewart Head (1954–2026) was an English film, television, voice, stage and radio actor. He was best known for his roles as Rupert Giles in Buffy the Vampire Slayer (1997–2003), the Prime Minister in Little Britain (2003–2006), Uther Pendragon in Merlin (2008–2012), and Rupert Mannion in Ted Lasso (2020–2023).

== Filmography ==
=== Film ===
| Year | Title | Role | Notes |
|---|---|---|---|
| 1981 | Lady Chatterley's Lover | Anton | |
| 1987 | A Prayer for the Dying | Rupert | |
| 1988 | La Collina del diavolo | Michael Toyle | |
| 1992 | Woof Again! Why Me? | B. J. Bentley | Direct-to-video release |
| 2001 | Junfans Attic | James | |
| 2003 | I'll Be There | Sam Gervasi | |
| 2004 | Fat Slags | Victor | |
| 2005 | Framing Frankie | Dennis Folley | |
| 2005 | Imagine Me & You | Ned | |
| 2006 | Scoop | Detective | |
| 2006 | Little Britain Live | Prime Minister | Direct-to-video release |
| 2007 | Sparkle | Tony | |
| 2007 | The Magic Door | George | Direct-to-video release |
| 2007 | Amelia and Michael | Michael | Short |
| 2007 | Sweeney Todd: The Demon Barber of Fleet Street | Gentleman in Street | Uncredited role Cameo appearance |
| 2008 | Repo! The Genetic Opera | Nathan Wallace/Repo Man | |
| 2011 | The Great Ghost Rescue | Prime Minister | |
| 2011 | The Inbetweeners Movie | Will's Father | |
| 2011 | Ghost Rider: Spirit of Vengeance | Benedict | |
| 2011 | The Iron Lady | Geoffrey Howe | |
| 2013 | Underdogs | Adult Flash | Voice |
| 2013 | Percy Jackson: Sea of Monsters | Chiron | |
| 2013 | Convenience | Barry | |
| 2014 | Flying Home | Mr. Montgomery | |
| 2016 | Despite the Falling Snow | Old Misha | |
| 2016 | A Street Cat Named Bob | Jack Bowen | |
| 2018 | Batman: Gotham by Gaslight | Alfred Pennyworth | Voice, direct-to-video |
| 2021 | School's Out Forever | Headmaster | |
| 2021 | Let the Wrong One In | Henry | |
| 2024 | Upgraded | Julian Marx | Final role |

=== Television ===
| Year | Title | Role | Notes |
|---|---|---|---|
| 1978 | Enemy at the Door | Clive Martel | 2 episodes |
| 1978 | Lillie | William Le Breton | ITV miniseries |
| 1978 | Accident | Simon Lovell | Episode: "The Figures Man" |
| 1979 | Jackanory Playhouse | Spare | Episode: "The Christmas Cuckoo" |
| 1979 | The Mallens | Weir | 2 episodes |
| 1979 | Secret Army | Hanslick | Episode: "A Safe Place" |
| 1980 | Love in a Cold Climate | Tony Kroesig | 3 episodes |
| 1981 | Crown Court | Timothy Preston-Berry | Episode: "Hen Party" |
| 1981 | Bergerac | Bill | Episode: "See You in Moscow" |
| 1981 | BBC2 Playhouse | Chief Hook | Episode: "The Grudge Fight" |
| 1984, 1988 | The Comic Strip Presents... | Ricki; Recording Studio Engineer | 2 episodes |
| 1985 | C.A.T.S. Eyes | James Sinden | Episode: "Goodbye, Jenny Wren" |
| 1985 | Howards' Way | Phil Norton | 5 episodes |
| 1987 | Boon | Richard Rathbone | Episode: "Day of the Yoke" |
| 1988 | Pulaski | Dudley Fielding | Episode: "The Price of Fame" |
| 1988 | Rockliffe's Babies | Chris Patterson | Episode: "A Trip to the Zoo" |
| 1989 | Hard Cases | DC 'Spider' Webb | Season 2, episode 6 |
| 1991 | Woof! | Bentley | 2 episodes |
| 1993 | The Detectives | Simon | Episode: "Acting Constables" |
| 1993 | Highlander: The Series | Allan Rothwood | Episode: "Nowhere to Run" |
| 1994 | Royce | Pitlock | Showtime television film |
| 1995 | VR.5 | Oliver Sampson | 10 episodes |
| 1995 | The Ghostbusters of East Finchley | Terry | 2 episodes |
| 1995 | NYPD Blue | Nigel Gibson | Episode: "Cold Heaters" |
| 1996 | Roger Roger | Jimmy Price | Television film |
| 1997 | Jonathan Creek | Adam Klaus | Episode: "The Wrestler's Tomb" |
| 1997–2003 | Buffy the Vampire Slayer | Rupert Giles | 121 episodes Main role (seasons 1–5); recurring role (seasons 6–7) |
| 1999 | Two Guys, a Girl and a Pizza Place | Dr Staretski | Episode: "Two Guys, a Girl and a Mother's Day" |
| 2000 | Best Actress | Colin Truemans | E! television film |
| 2001 | Silent Witness | Henry Hutton | Episode: "Two Below Zero" |
| 2002 | Spooks | Peter Salter | Episode: "Traitor's Gate" |
| 2002 | Fillmore! | Professor Third | Voice, 2 episodes |
| 2002–2003 | Manchild | James | 15 episodes |
| 2003 | And Starring Pancho Villa as Himself | William Benton | HBO television film |
| 2003 | Reversals | Andrew Barton | ITV television film |
| 2003, 2005 | My Family | Richard Harper / Himself | 2 episodes |
| 2003–2006 | Little Britain | Michael Stevens | 23 episodes |
| 2004 | True Horror with Anthony Head | Presenter | 5 episodes |
| 2004 | New Tricks | Sir Tim | Episode: "Painting on Loan" |
| 2004 | Monarch of the Glen | Chester Grant | 4 episodes |
| 2005 | Murder Investigation Team | Stewart Masters | Season 2, episode 2 |
| 2005 | Rose and Maloney | David Terry | Episode: "Annie Johnson" |
| 2006 | Hotel Babylon | Mr. Machin | Season 1, episode 2 |
| 2006 | Doctor Who | Mr. Finch | Episode: "School Reunion" |
| 2006 | Children's Party at the Palace | Captain Hook | BBC television special |
| 2006 | Him and Us | Max Flash | Unsold television pilot |
| 2007 | Comic Relief 2007: The Big One | Various | Television special |
| 2007 | Persuasion | Sir Walter Elliot | Television film |
| 2007 | Totally Doctor Who | Baltazar | Voice role in The Infinite Quest |
| 2007 | Sensitive Skin | Tom Paine | 2 episodes |
| 2007 | Sold | Mr. Colubrine | 6 episodes |
| 2007–2008 | Heroes Unmasked | Narrator | Series 1 & 2 |
| 2007–2009 | Doctor Who Confidential | Narrator | 30 episodes |
| 2008 | Freezing | Lindsay Posner | Season 1, episode 2 |
| 2008 | The Invisibles | Maurice Riley | BBC One series |
| 2008–2012 | Merlin | Uther Pendragon | 43 episodes |
| 2009 | Free Agents | Stephen Caudwell | Channel 4 TV series |
| 2011–2012 | Free Agents | Stephen Caudwell | NBC TV series (US remake of the Channel 4 series of the same name) |
| 2013 | Dancing on the Edge | Donaldson | BBC Two series |
| 2013 | NTSF:SD:SUV:: | Corningham | Episode: "U-KO'ed" |
| 2013–2014 | Warehouse 13 | Paracelsus | 4 episodes |
| 2013–2015 | You, Me & Them | Ed Walker | UKTV Gold series |
| 2014–2015 | Dominion | David Whele | Main cast |
| 2015 | Galavant | Galavant's Father | Episode: "My Cousin Izzy" |
| 2015–2016 | Yonderland | Nigel Maddox | 3 episodes |
| 2016 | Drunk History | Admiral Horatio Nelson, Alexander Graham Bell | 2 episodes |
| 2016 | Guilt | James Lahue | 5 episodes |
| 2017 | Still Star-Crossed | Lord Silvestro Capulet | Series regular |
| 2017 | Shadowhunters | Angel Raziel | Voice, episode: "Beside Still Water" |
| 2018 | Girlfriends | John | 5 episodes |
| 2018 | The Split | Oscar Defoe | 6 episodes |
| 2018 | Vanity Fair | Lord Steyne | 3 episodes |
| 2019 | Jack Ryan | Rupert Thorne | 2 episodes |
| 2019–2022 | Motherland | Bill | 4 episodes |
| 2020 | The Stranger | Ed Price | 8 episodes |
| 2020 | The Big Night In | Michael Stevens | TV special |
| 2020 | Robot Chicken | Rupert Giles / Albus Dumbledore | Voice, episode: "Endgame" |
| 2020–2023 | Ted Lasso | Rupert Mannion | Recurring role (season 1); guest (season 2); regular (season 3) |
| 2021 | Back | Charismatic Mike | Season 2, episode 2 |
| 2021 | Feel Good | George Senior | 2 episodes |
| 2021 | Adventure Time: Distant Lands | Wizard Con | Voice, episode: "Wizard City" |
| 2021 | The Canterville Ghost | Sir Simon de Canterville | 4 episodes |
| 2022 | Bridgerton | Lord Sheffield | Episode: "An Unthinkable Fate" |

=== Audio ===
| Year | Title | Role | Notes |
|---|---|---|---|
| 2007–2012 | Bleak Expectations | Gently Benevolent & Jeremy Sourquill | BBC Radio |
| 2010 | Ghost Stories by Walter de la Mare | The Reader | Episode 4 of 5: "A Recluse" |
| 2011–2014 | Cabin Pressure | Herc Shipwright | 7 episodes, BBC Radio |
| 2012 | Clayton Grange | Saunders | BBC Radio |
| 2013 | Neverwhere | Mr. Croup | BBC Radio |
| 2016 | Robin of Sherwood: The Knights Of The Apocalypse | Guichard de Montbalm | |
| 2018 | The Archers | Robin Fairbrother | BBC Radio |
| 2023 | Slayers: A Buffyverse Story | Rupert Giles | Audible original |

=== Stage ===
| Year | Title | Role | Director | Venue | Notes | Ref. |
|---|---|---|---|---|---|---|
| 1977 | Henry V | Duke of Clarence | Fred Proud | Ludlow Castle | | |
| 1980 | Julius Caesar | Artemidorus | Peter Gill | Riverside Studios | | |
| 1980 | Fear of the Dark | Robert Slade | Walter Donohue | Royal Court Theatre | Press night | |
| 1981 | Godspell | Light of the World | Stuart Mungall | Young Vic | | |
| 1982 | The Prince of Homburg | Captain Golz | John Burgess | Royal National Theatre | | |
| 1982–1984 | Danton's Death | Sans-culottes / Young Gentleman / La Flotte | Peter Gill | Royal National Theatre | | |
| 1983 | A Patriot for Me | Lt Stefan Kovacs / Kupfer's Second / Deputy | Ronald Eyre | Chichester Festival Theatre | | |
| 1983 | A Patriot for Me | Lt Stefan Kovacs / Kupfer's Second / Deputy | Ronald Eyre | Theatre Royal Haymarket | | |
| 1985–1986 | Yonadab | Absalom | Peter Hall | Royal National Theatre | | |
| 1988–1989 | Chess | Freddie Trumper | Trevor Nunn | Prince Edward Theatre | World premiere | |
| 1989–1990 | Lady Windermere's Fan | Lord Darlington | Anthony Ward | Bristol Old Vic | | |
| 1990–1991 | The Rocky Horror Show | Dr. Frank-N-Furter | Robin Lefevre | Piccadilly Theatre | | |
| 1992 | The Heiress | Morris Townsend | John David | —N/a | Tour | |
| 1992–1993 | Rope | Rupert Cadell | Keith Baxter | Minerva Theatre, Chichester | | |
| 1994 | Rope | Rupert Cadell | Keith Baxter | —N/a | Tour | |
| 2003–2004 | Peter Pan | Captain Hook | Steven Dexter | Savoy Theatre | | |
| 2004 | The Pirates of Penzance | The Pirate King | Steven Dexter | Savoy Theatre | | |
| 2005–2006 | Otherwise Engaged | Jeff Golding | Simon Curtis | —N/a | Tour | |
| 2006 | The Rocky Horror Tribute Show | Dr. Frank-N-Furter | | Royal Court Theatre | Charity show | |
| 2010 | Six Degrees of Separation | Flan Kittredge | David Grindley | The Old Vic | | |
| 2015 | Rocky Horror Show Live | Fourth Narrator | Christopher Luscombe | Playhouse Theatre | | |
| 2015 | Ticking | Edward (Simon's father) | Paul Andrew Williams | Trafalgar Studios | World premiere | |
| 2017 | Love In Idleness | Sir John Fletcher | Trevor Nunn | Menier Chocolate Factory | | |
| 2018 | The Muppets Take the O2 | Himself | Andrew Williams | The O2 Arena | | |

=== Video games ===
| Year | Title | Role | Notes |
|---|---|---|---|
| 2002 | Buffy the Vampire Slayer | Rupert Giles | |
| 2003 | Buffy the Vampire Slayer: Chaos Bleeds | Rupert Giles | |
| 2006 | Destroy All Humans! 2 | Reginald Ponsonby-Smythe | |
