= Dub N Bass: Omen II =

Studio album by D!v!s!on #9
- Released: 1997
- Recorded: Winter – Spring 1997
- Studio: DAMn! Studios
- Genre: Electronic
- Length: 61:05
- Label: Tinman
- Producer: Mick Hale

D!v!s!on #9 chronology
The True Creator (1996)	Dub N Bass: Omen II (1997)

Dub N Bass: Omen II is the second and final studio album by D!v!s!on #9, released in 1997 by Tinman. This was released on New Jersey–based music label Tinman after the bankruptcy of the project's previous label, Fifth Colvmn Records. The track "Omen II" was contributed to the 1998 various artists compilation Empire One, also released by Tinman.

== Reception ==
Sonic Boom commended the artistic growth shown by D!v!s!on #9 in the compositions and claimed "those changes make the album much easier to listen to outside of a club situation because you can actually enjoy the music without being forced into a crowded dance hall."

== Track listing ==
All tracks are written by Mick Hale

No.	Title	Length
1.	"Righteous Muzik"	5:31
2.	"Ez Jazzy"	5:55
3.	"Nousexcuse"	10:09
4.	"This One (Educate)"	6:51
5.	"Omen II"	4:06
6.	"Dis Is It"	6:28
7.	"Always Now Forever"	4:26
8.	"Dread Outta Control"	3:59
9.	"Everybody Ocean"	13:40

== Personnel ==
Adapted from the Dub N Bass: Omen II liner notes.

D!v!s!on #9

- Mick Hale – instruments, production

Production and design

- Alan Douches – mastering
- Zalman Fishman – executive-producer
- Modern Design – design
- Shred – engineering

== Release history ==
Region	Date	Label	Format	Catalog
United States	1997	Tinman	CD	009
