= Join My Pretty World =

Studio album by Geko
- Released: November 17, 1992
- Recorded: 1991 – 1992
- Genre: Gothic rock, alternative rock
- Length: 41:24
- Label: Open
- Producer: Earle Mankey

Join My Pretty World is the debut studio album by Geko, released on November 17, 1992, by Open Records.

== Reception ==
Professional ratings
Review scores
Source	Rating
AllMusic	3/5 stars

Ned Raggett of AllMusic says "Join My Pretty World finds the sharply powerful duo creating rough, industrial-strength darkwave music that easily bears repeated listening" and "is an underrated effort well worth seeking out."

== Track listing ==
All tracks are written by Sarah Folkman and Carrie McNinch.

No.	Title	Length
1.	"She Says"	4:28
2.	"Goodnight"	3:27
3.	"Trickle In"	3:33
4.	"Join My Pretty World"	3:55
5.	"Mary Loves the War Zone"	3:51
6.	"I Never Knew Any of This"	2:16
7.	"Nameless"	5:12
8.	"Miss Me" (92 remix)	4:08
9.	"A Toxic Life" (92 remix)	3:40
10.	"Completely This" (92 remix)	6:23
11.	"When We Were Very Young"	0:31

== Personnel ==
Adapted from the Join My Pretty World liner notes.

Geko

- Sarah Folkman – lead vocals, bass guitar, drum programming, musical arrangements
- Carrie McNinch – guitar, drum programming, musical arrangements

Production

- Earle Mankey – production

== Release history ==
Region	Date	Label	Format
United States	1992	Open	CD
