= Bobby "Werner" Strete =

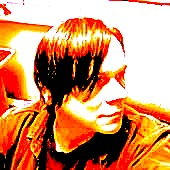
Bobby "Werner" Strete

Bobby Strete (born Robert Werner Ahrendt), also known as Werner or R.A. Werner, is an American musician who is best known as the bass player in New Jersey pop-punk/garage band Mod Fun and, later, with the industrial combo Crocodile Shop.

Strete began playing bass in 1979 at the age of 12, when he formed the band that would eventually become Mod Fun with childhood friends Mick Hale and Chris Collins. He initially learned the standard 4-string electric bass and, later, stand-up bass (which he occasionally played with a jazz combo at a local restaurant) as well as the electric guitar which he continues to play to this day. He grew up in Lodi, New Jersey, and met and played in bands with Eerie Von Stellmann and Steve Zing both from Samhain and Danzig fame, while he attended Lodi High School.

In the mid-1980s he and Mod Fun drummer Collins also did a brief stint as the rhythm-section of an otherwise all female pop-rock outfit known as The Vertical Smiles.

Strete contributed bass lines and backing vocals to the entire recorded output of Mod Fun from 1983 to 1987 after which he became known as "R.A. Werner" and continued working with Hale in Crocodile Shop until 1997. He departed from Crocodile Shop soon after their European tour in the summer of 1997. Strete/Werner then became one of the driving forces behind New Jersey punk band X-Breed, in which he played bass, guitar, sang backing vocals, and contributed to the song writing. They released a full-length CD entitled Reduced To Nothing and a 3-song EP on their own.

In 2004, Bobby Strete re-emerged as the bassist in Crocodile Shop (now known simply as "Croc Shop") and participated in the reunion of Mod Fun. After reuniting, Strete and his friends in Mod Fun released a double-length CD entitled Now...and Again and they performed at a wide variety of venues in New York, New Jersey, and in major cities around the U.S.

Between 2004 and 2006 Strete also served as the bassist in reformed New York power-pop group The Punch Line, which put out an album during his tenure. In 2007, he contributed a good deal of guitar work to bandmate Chris Collins' debut solo album.
