= Santiago Cabrera =

Chilean actor (born 1978)

- Cabrera in 2026
- Born: 5 May 1978 (age 48); Caracas, Venezuela
- Citizenship: Chile; Venezuela; USA
- Education: Drama Centre London (BA)
- Occupation: Actor
- Years active: 2003–present
- Spouse: Anna Marcea (m. 2003)
- Children: 1

Santiago Cabrera (Spanish pronunciation: [sanˈtjaɣo kaˈβɾeɾa]; born 5 May 1978) is a Chilean actor who has worked mainly in the UK, USA and Chile. Cabrera is best known for his roles as the character Isaac Mendez in the NBC superhero drama Heroes, Lancelot in the BBC drama series Merlin, and Aramis in the BBC series The Musketeers. He was also the lead in the CBS drama Salvation as Darius Tanz, played Captain Cristóbal Rios in the Paramount+ series Star Trek: Picard, and cartel leader Jorge Sanchez in The Cleaning Lady (American TV series)

== Early life ==
Cabrera was born in Caracas, Venezuela, where his father, a Chilean diplomat, was stationed at the time. He is the middle child of three. Moving along with his father's career, Santiago grew up mainly in England, but also in Romania, Toronto and Madrid. His family returned to Chile when he was fifteen years old. He was captain of his football team in high school, and only tried acting when his teachers encouraged him. He trained at the Drama Centre London from 2000 to 2003.

== Career ==
Concurrent with his final year at the centre, he made his television debut with small roles in the British television series Battlefield Britain, Judge John Deed, Spooks and As If. His first role after graduating from drama school was Montano in Shakespeare's Othello, at the Royal Theatre Northampton. He also appeared in the 2006 film Love and Other Disasters as the Argentinian Paolo Sarmiento, alongside Brittany Murphy and Matthew Rhys.

He has appeared on American television first in Empire, as Octavius. He appeared as Isaac Mendez in the NBC series Heroes; once the character's arc ended, he narrated some episodes of the BBC's spin-off documentary series Heroes Unmasked. He also played Lancelot in the BBC drama series Merlin and Aramis in The Musketeers.

On 20 January 2007 episode of the NBC Universal late-night programme Vivo Mun2, Cabrera discussed his semi-professional football career in London before he fully committed to acting. He also stated that C.D. Universidad Católica of Santiago is his favourite team, however, he remains a fan of London club Queens Park Rangers F.C., for which he was a mascot as a child.

On 7 September 2008, Cabrera participated in Soccer Aid, a British charity football match in support of UNICEF. He later repeated this venture in 2014, playing once again for the Rest of the World. In November 2008 he played for the Hollywood United team in a special charity match raising money for people affected by the devastation of Hurricane Ike.

Santiago has also played the role of Darius Tanz in the CBS/Netflix show Salvation.

On 4 March 2019, CBS announced Cabrera was cast in Star Trek: Picard, starring Patrick Stewart, which began shooting in April 2019. He played the supporting role of Captain Cristobal Rios in the limited series. Cabrera appeared in Disney's Godmothered in 2020.

On 9 September 2021, Cabrera announced he would return to Star Trek: Picard for the series' second season with a trailer posted to his Instagram. On 5 May 2022, Cabrera promoted the final episode of the second season of Picard on his Instagram. It was his last appearance on the series.

In 2024, he played Richard Deetz, husband of Lydia and father of Astrid Deetz, in Beetlejuice Beetlejuice, a sequel to 1988's Beetlejuice.

== Personal life ==
Santiago Cabrera is married to Anna Marcea, they have one son and they currently reside in Los Angeles.

== Filmography ==
=== Film ===
Year	Title	Role	Notes
2004	Haven	Gene	
2006	Love and Other Disasters	Paolo Sarmiento	
2008	Che	Camilo Cienfuegos	
2010	The Life of Fish	Andres	
2012	For Greater Glory	Father Vega	
2017	Transformers: The Last Knight	Santos	
2017	What Happened to Monday	Infomercial processor	
2019	Ema	Aníbal	
2020	Godmothered	Hugh	
2024	Beetlejuice Beetlejuice	Richard	

=== Television ===
Year	Title	Role	Notes
2003	Spooks	Camilo Henriquez	2 episodes
2003	Judge John Deed	Carlos Fedor	Episode: "Conspiracy"
2005	Empire	Octavius	Miniseries (main role)
2006, 2007, 2009	Heroes	Isaac Mendez	Main role (season 1); guest star (season 4)
2008	Heroes Unmasked	Narrator	Series 3
2008–2011	Merlin	Lancelot	Series 1 (2008), episode 5: "Lancelot"; Series 2 (2009), episode 4: "Lancelot and Guinevere"; Series 3 (2010), episode 13: "The Coming of Arthur (Part 2)"; Series 4 (2011), episode 1 "The Darkest Hour – Part 1", episode 2: "The Darkest Hour – Part 2", episode 9: "Lancelot Du Lac"
2011	Covert Affairs	Zavier Extarte	Episode: "The Wake-Up Bomb"
2011	Alcatraz	Jimmy Dickens	Episode: "Pilot"
2012	Hemingway & Gellhorn	Robert Capa	Television film
2012	Dexter	Sal Price	2 episodes
2012	Falcón	Judge Esteban Calderón	2 episodes
2012–2013	Anna Karenina	Vronsky	Miniseries
2014–2016	The Musketeers	Aramis	Main role
2015	Patagonia: Earth's Secret Paradise	Narrator	
2016	The Mindy Project	Diego	Episode: "Under the Texan Sun"
2017, 2019	Big Little Lies	Joseph Bachman	8 episodes
2017–2018	Salvation	Darius Tanz	Main role, 26 episodes
2020–2022	Star Trek: Picard	Cristóbal "Chris" Rios / Emil / Enoch / Emmet / Iain / Mister Hospitality	Main role
2020	The Ready Room	Himself	Episode: "Episode 17"
2022	The Flight Attendant	Marco	Recurring role (season 2), 4 episodes
2023	Neon	Oscar	Recurring role, 6 episodes
2024–2025	The Cleaning Lady	Jorge Sanchez	Main role (season 3–4)
2024	Land of Women	Amat	Main role

=== Video game ===
Year	Title	Voice role	Notes
2004	TOCA Race Driver 2	Cesar Maques	

== Theatre ==
Year	Title	Role	Notes
2008	Romeo and Juliet	Romeo	
