= Yeht Mae =

Californian electro-industrial band

- Origin: California, United States
- Genres: Electro-industrial
- Years active: 1987–1997
- Labels: Gymnastic Records; Zoth Ommog; Out of Line; Metropolis
- Past members: Jeremy Daw; Lynda Sterling

Yeht Mae was an electro-industrial band from California which began in 1988 by vocalist and keyboard programmer Jeremy Daw. Daw was later joined by vocalist Lynda Sterling and released two self-distributed cassette demos. Their first CD 1000 Veins was released by the British gothic/industrial label Gymnastic Records whose albums were pressed in Germany.

In 1992, Daw wanted to find a new label and sent a demo tape to Zoth Ommog Records label head Talla 2XLC of the band Bigod 20. Unbeknownst to Daw, his track "Proximity Effect" had already found its way onto the Zoth Ommog compilation Body Rapture II, which helped in achieving a contract with the label. The band went on to release two albums on the label, Anatomy in 1992 and Transmitter in 1994.

The band's primary lyrical themes cover strange subjects such as death, experimental surgery, and alien abductions.

Daw later formed T.H.C. (originally named "The Hard Corps") with George Sarah of Stereotaxic Device.

== Discography ==
- Against Nature – cassette demo (1988)
- Endless Enemies – cassette demo (1990)
- 1000 Veins – CD (1991) Gymnastic Records
- Anatomy – CD (1992) Zoth Ommog
- Transmitter – CD (1994) Zoth Ommog
- eaM theY – CD (1996) Out of Line Music • CD (1997) Metropolis Records

=== Compilation appearances ===
- Sacred War – CD track #3 "Keep the Devil Down" (1990) Gymnastic Records
- Hurt-A Psychotechnics Compilation – LP Side B track #5 "Remission" – (1991) Braindrops Records
- Torture Tech Overdrive – LP Side B track #5 "Freedom" (1991) If It Moves...
- Body Rapture II – CD track #8 "Proximity Effect" (1992) Zoth Ommog
- Zoth In Your Mind – CD track #3 "Take Him Out Back" (1993) Zoth Ommog
- The Colours of Zoth Ommog – CD track #8 "Beater" (1994) Zoth Ommog
- Torture Tech Overdrive – CD track #13 "Freedom" (1994) Cleopatra Records
- Totentanz – The Best of Zoth Ommog 2xCD CD #2 track #7 "Gods and Children" – (1994) Cleopatra Records
- There Is No Time – 4xCD CD #3 track #2 "Gun Control" (1995) Ras Dva Records
- On the Line – CD track #4 "Lynaka Says Don't Dream" and track #5 "Heaven in Hell" (1996) Out of Line
- Vertigo Compilation (04/1996) – CD track #4 "Lynaka Says Don't Dream" – (1996) Celtic Circle Productions
- Awake the Machines – On the Line Vol. 2 – 2xCD CD #1 track #15 "Awake the Machine" 1997, Out of Line / Sub/Mission Records
- The Complete History of Zoth Ommog: Totentanz – 4xCD CD #2 track #7 "Gods and Children" – (1999) Cleopatra Records
