= Once More, with Feeling (Buffy soundtrack) =

Buffy the Vampire Slayer: Once More, with Feeling

Soundtrack album by various artists
- Released: September 24, 2002
- Genres: Pop; rock; jazz
- Length: 57:34
- Label: Rounder
- Producers: Christophe Beck; Jesse Tobias; Joss Whedon

Professional ratings
Review scores
Source	Rating
AllMusic	5/5 stars
Sputnikmusic	4/5 stars

Once More, with Feeling is the soundtrack album for the Buffy the Vampire Slayer episode of the same name. The album features the original series cast performing the songs from the episode, as well as additional music from other popular episodes by regular composer Christophe Beck, including suites from season four episodes "Hush" and "Restless" and as a score piece from season five episode "The Gift". Also included is a demo track of "Something to Sing About" performed by series creator and album songwriter Joss Whedon and his then-wife Kai Cole. The art for the album – which is also used as cover for related items, such as the script book, the Region 2 DVD and the poster – is by comic book artist Adam Hughes. The booklet includes liner notes by Whedon, the lyrics for the numbers, and various pictures from the episode.

== Critical reception ==
AllMusic gave the album five out of five stars, stating that the music is "every bit as fun as the episode itself", praising the voices of Benson, Marsters and Head. Reviewer Melinda Hill called it "a must-have for Buffy fans, but it wouldn't be out of place in anyone's collection". Sputnikmusic states: "All in all, this is by far the greatest TV musical of all time," and "it's a shining example of what any TV musical should hope to accomplish."

== Commercial performance ==
The album achieved moderate success in the United States, where it reached 49 on the US Billboard 200. The album also charted at number 97 in Australia. Although not charting in the United Kingdom, the album was eventually awarded a Gold certification in 2022 for sales of over 100,000 copies.

== Track listing ==
Vocal performers are in brackets and are listed as their character name. Tracks with no performer are score pieces by Christophe Beck.

No.	Title	Length
1.	"Overture"/"Going Through the Motions" (Buffy)	2:59
2.	"I've Got a Theory"/"Bunnies"/"If We're Together" (Giles/Willow/Xander/Anya/Tara/Buffy)	2:22
3.	"The Mustard" (Man)	0:19
4.	"Under Your Spell" (Tara)	2:56
5.	"I'll Never Tell" (Anya/Xander)	4:01
6.	"The Parking Ticket" (Young Woman)	0:45
7.	"Rest in Peace" (Spike)	2:44
8.	"Dawn's Lament" (Dawn)	1:20
9.	"Dawn's Ballet"	1:12
10.	"What You Feel" (Sweet/Dawn)	3:00
11.	"Standing" (Giles)	2:11
12.	"Under Your Spell"/"Standing" (reprise) (Tara/Giles)	1:35
13.	"Walk Through the Fire" (Buffy/Spike/Sweet/Giles/Xander/Anya/Tara/Willow)	3:44
14.	"Something to Sing About" (Buffy/Spike)	4:40
15.	"What You Feel" (reprise) (Sweet)	0:46
16.	"Where Do We Go from Here?" (Dawn/Buffy/Spike/Giles/Tara/Xander/Anya)	1:53
17.	"Coda" (Buffy/Spike)	0:40
18.	"End Credits" ("Broom Dance"/"Grr Arrgh")	0:32
19.	"Main Title"	0:27
20.	"Suite from Restless" ("Willow's Nightmare"/"First Rage"/"Chain of Ancients")	5:04
21.	"Suite from Hush" ("Silent Night"/"First Kiss"/"Enter the Gentlemen"/"Schism")	6:57
22.	"Sacrifice" (from The Gift)	2:57
23.	"Something to Sing About" (demo) (Kai Cole/Joss Whedon)	4:30
Total length:		57:34

== Personnel ==
Production:
Executive producer: Christopher Buchanan
Coordinator: Marni Feenberg
Produced by Christophe Beck, Jesse Tobias and Joss Whedon
Arranged by Christophe Beck and Jesse Tobias

Associate music director: Douglas Stevens
Supervising music editor: Fernand Bos
Music editor: Tim Isle

All music and lyrics: Joss Whedon
Track 9 composed by Christophe Beck
Track 19 composed by Nerf Herder
Tracks 20, 21 and 22 composed and produced by Christophe Beck

Recorded by Casey Stone and Andrew Alekel
Mixed by Casey Stone and Matt Wallace
Mastered by Jonathan Wyner
Mastering Facility: M Works, Cambridge, Massachusetts

Orchestrations by Christophe Beck and Kevin Kleisch
Orchestra contractor: Shari Sutcliffe
Vocal contractor: Sally Stevens

Musicians:
Timothy Anderson – background vocals
Hinton Battle – vocals (tracks 10, 13, 15)
Amber Benson – vocals (tracks 2, 4, 12, 13, 16, 17)
Nicholas Brendon – vocals (tracks 2, 5, 13, 16, 17)
Kai Cole – vocals (track 23)
Emma Caulfield – vocals (tracks 2, 5, 13, 16, 17)
Laura Engel – backing vocals
Alex Estronei – background vocals
Josh Freese – drums, guitars
David Fury – vocals (track 3)
Sarah Michelle Gellar – vocals (tracks 1, 2, 13, 14, 16, 17)
Alyson Hannigan – vocals (tracks 2, 13, 17)
Angie Hart – background vocals (track 4)
Anthony Head – vocals (tracks 2, 11 to 13, 16, 17)
Steven McDonald – bass, guitars
Michelle Trachtenberg – vocals (tracks 8, 16, 17)
James Marsters – vocals (tracks 7, 13, 14, 16, 17), guitar (track 7)
Christian Vincent – background vocals
Daniel Weaver – background vocals
Joss Whedon – piano, vocals (track 23)
Zachary Woodley – background vocals
Scott Zeller – background vocals

Album personnel:
Executive in charge of music for Twentieth Century Fox: Robert Kraft
Music supervisor for Twentieth Century Fox: Geoff Bywater and Jacquie Perryman
Music production supervised by Carol Farhart
Fox Music business affairs: Tom Cavanaugh
Public relations: Jeffrey Taylor Light

Album artwork:
Illustrations by Adam Hughes
Photographs by Mitchell Haasath and Richard Cartwright
Design by Steven Jurgensmeyer

== Charts ==
Chart performance for Once More, with Feeling
Chart (2002–2003)	Peak position
Australian Albums (ARIA)	97
Canadian Albums (Billboard)	37
French Albums (SNEP)	25
German Albums (Offizielle Top 100)	7
US Billboard 200	49
US Billboard Top Internet	49
US Billboard Top Soundtracks	3

== Certifications ==
Certifications for Once More, with Feeling
Region	Certification	Certified units/sales
United Kingdom (BPI)	Gold	100,000^{‡}
^{‡} Sales+streaming figures based on certification alone.
