= Death by Design (album) =

Studio album by T.H.C.
- Released: January 23, 1996
- Studio: Various: Institute of Gizmology; (Anaheim, California); Y.M. Studios; (Alta Loma, California)
- Genres: Electronic; industrial; techno
- Length: 45:06
- Label: Fifth Colvmn Records
- Producer: George Sarah

T.H.C. chronology
Death by Design (1996)	Consenting Guinea Pig (1996)

Death by Design is the debut studio album of T.H.C., released on January 23, 1996 by Fifth Colvmn Records.

== Reception ==
In reviewing Death by Design, Aiding & Abetting criticized the songwriting of the slower songs but said "T.H.C. packs enough distortion and speed into the songs to satisfy any fan of that kind of electronic madness." A critic at Sonic Boom gave the album a mixed review, saying "sure the music is sparse, dancey as hell, and sometimes drifts towards an ambient style setting but without any depth of layering what does the music actually offer to the audience?" The critic concluded by stating "the few ambient tracks on this album do make for an excellent stereophonic experience and tend to contain a great deal more complexity which I think are the saving grace for this album."

== Track listing ==
All tracks are written by George Sarah, except "Allopathic Medicine" and "Death by Design" co-written with Timothy Wiles.

No.	Title	Length
1.	"Somebody Has to Die"	5:22
2.	"Allopathic Medicine"	6:32
3.	"Gun Control"	2:46
4.	"Bangkok Six"	5:14
5.	"T.H.C."	5:17
6.	"Death by Design"	5:47
7.	"Directly from Angels"	3:29
8.	"Directly from Satan"	5:26
9.	"Xenotransplant"	5:12

== Personnel ==
Adapted from the Death by Design liner notes.

T.H.C.

- Jeremy Daw – additional programming (1, 3, 5, 8)
- George Sarah – producer, recording (2, 6)

Production and design

- Zalman Fishman – executive-producer
- Lorraine Kay – cover art, illustrations
- Timothy Wiles (as Q) – recording (2, 4, 6, 7, 9), additional programming (4, 7, 9)

== Release history ==
Region	Date	Label	Format	Catalog
United States	1996	Fifth Colvmn Records	CD	9868-63208
United States	1996		CS	
