= Music for Elevators =

Studio album by Anthony Stewart Head and George Sarah
- Released: February 5, 2002
- Genre: Alternative rock, electronica, ambient, trip hop
- Length: 68:39
- Label: Beautiful Is As Beautiful Does
- Producer: David Haerle (Executive), Karrie M. Miller (Executive), Sandee Curry (Executive)

Music for Elevators is a music album written and performed by Anthony Stewart Head and George Sarah. The label Beautiful Is As Beautiful Does knew that Head and Sarah had worked together on the television series Buffy the Vampire Slayer, and suggested that they should do something together. They did exactly that, and the album was released on February 5, 2002 after an 11-month recording period.

== Guest appearances ==
Fellow Buffy cast members James Marsters, Amber Benson and Alyson Hannigan lent their vocals for use on the album. Benson sings on the songs "All The Fun Of The Fair," "Last Time," and "We Can Work It Out," while Marsters appears on "Owning My Mistakes." He can also be heard about seven minutes after the "end" of "End Game" reciting parts of "Owning My Mistakes" as a poem. Hannigan does not sing, but can be heard talking in "End Game." Other guest vocalists include Milton Katselas, singer-songwriter Holly Palmer, actress Justina Machado, Suzy Prudden, singer Colleen Fitzpatrick and actress Camille Saviola. Joss Whedon, creator of Buffy, also wrote the song "Last Time."

Head's mother Helen Shingler contributed the instrumental song "Mum's Song," where she plays the piano.

== Track listing ==
The lyrics are written by Anthony Head and the music is composed/arranged by both him and George Sarah, except as noted below. The instrumental parts are played by both Head and Sarah, and sometimes by other musicians. Head sings in most of the songs as well.

No.	Title	Length
1.	"What Can You Tell Me"	6:00
2.	"Babies [The In Between]" (Music by Anthony Head)	3:46
3.	"Owning My Mistakes"	3:14
4.	"[Segue]"	0:28
5.	"We Can Work It Out" (Cover of a song by The Beatles)	4:17
6.	"Qu’est-ce que j’ai fait" (Music by George Sarah)	4:11
7.	"All the Fun of the Fair"	4:15
8.	"This Town in the Rain"	3:33
9.	"Talk to You"	2:25
10.	"Mum's Song" (Written and performed by Helen Shingler)	2:22
11.	"Last Time" (Music and lyrics by Joss Whedon)	3:43
12.	"One Man's Rain"	6:37
13.	"[Segue]"	0:53
14.	"Change"	7:34
15.	"Staring at the Sun" (Hidden track)	3:31
16.	"End Game" (Hidden track; Music by George Sarah)	12:56

== Personnel ==
- Jay Bellerose - drums
- David Mergen - cello
- Camille Saviola - bass voice
- Veikko Lepisto - upright bass
- Amber Benson
- Anthony Stewart Head - vocals
- George Sarah - guitar, acoustic guitar, strings, piano, Fender Rhodes piano, Wurlitzer organ, synthesizer, bass guitar, tambourine, bells
- Holly Palmer - vocals
- Kristen Autry - violin, viola
- Tom MacDonald - piano
