= Anthony Head =

English actor (1954–2026)

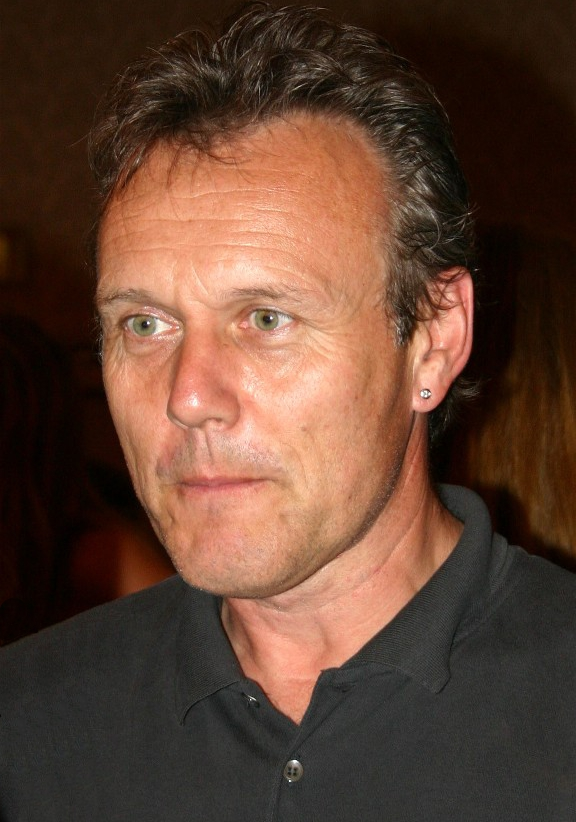
- Head in 2004
- Born: Anthony Stewart Head; 20 February 1954; Camden Town, London, England
- Died: 1 June 2026 (aged 72)
- Education: London Academy of Music and Dramatic Art
- Occupations: Actor; singer
- Years active: 1977–2024
- Works: Filmography
- Partner: Sarah Fisher (1982; died 2025)
- Children: Emily; Daisy
- Mother: Helen Shingler
- Relatives: Murray Head (brother)

Anthony Stewart Head (20 February 1954 – 1 June 2026) was an English actor and singer. Primarily a performer in musical theatre, he rose to fame in the United Kingdom in the 1980s following his role in the Gold Blend couple television advertisements for Nescafé, which led to major roles in several television series.

Head was best known for his role as Rupert Giles in Buffy the Vampire Slayer (1997–2003), as well as the prime minister in Little Britain (2003–2006), Uther Pendragon in Merlin (2008–2012), and Rupert Mannion in Ted Lasso (2020–2023). He was also known for his distinctive baritone voice, in advertising and voice roles such as Herc Shipwright in BBC Radio 4's Cabin Pressure (2011–2014). His film career included roles in Persuasion (2007), Ghost Rider: Spirit of Vengeance, The Iron Lady (both 2011), and Percy Jackson: Sea of Monsters (2013).

== Early life and education ==
Anthony Stewart Head was born on 20 February 1954 in Camden Town, London. His father was Seafield Laurence Stewart Murray Head (1919–2009), a documentary filmmaker and a founder of Verity Films, and his mother was actress Helen Shingler (1919–2019). His older brother is actor and singer Murray Head. Both brothers played the part of Freddie Trumper in the musical Chess at the Prince Edward Theatre, London, with Murray as part of the original cast in 1986, while Anthony was in the final cast in 1989.

Head was educated at Sunbury Grammar School in Surrey, and furthered his education studying acting at the London Academy of Music and Dramatic Art (LAMDA). In discussing why he chose acting as a career, in a 2013 interview he said: "When it's in your family, it's a choice, it's there. It's not a jump to say: 'I want to act.' When I was six I was in a little show my mother's friends organised, playing the Emperor in The Emperor's New Clothes. I remember thinking: 'This is the business, this is what I want to do.'"

== Career ==
=== 1970s–1990s: Early roles and Buffy ===
One of Head's earlier roles was in the musical Godspell in 1978 with Su Pollard. In the same year, he made his television debut in the London Weekend Television series Enemy at the Door as Clive Martel, of the island resistance.

In the early 1980s he provided backing vocals for the band Red Box. He was featured as well on the album Face in the Window (1983) by Two Way. In 1981, he featured as one of the 'Bobs' in the Not the Nine O'Clock News sketch 'Made by Roberts'.

In the late 1980s, he gained wider recognition as the man in the Gold Blend couple series of coffee commercials, alongside Sharon Maughan, for Nescafé Gold Blend between 1987 and 1993. (A version made for North America featured the American brand name Taster's Choice from 1990 to 1997).

Head played Frank N. Furter in the 1990–91 West End revival of The Rocky Horror Show at London's Piccadilly Theatre, with Craig Ferguson as Brad Majors. In 1991, Head's rendition of "Sweet Transvestite" was released as a single by Chrysalis Records. Head played the role again in the summer of 1995 at London's Duke of York's Theatre, a May 2006 tribute show at London's Royal Court Theatre, and an October 2000 production at the Hard Rock Hotel and Casino, Las Vegas, Nevada.

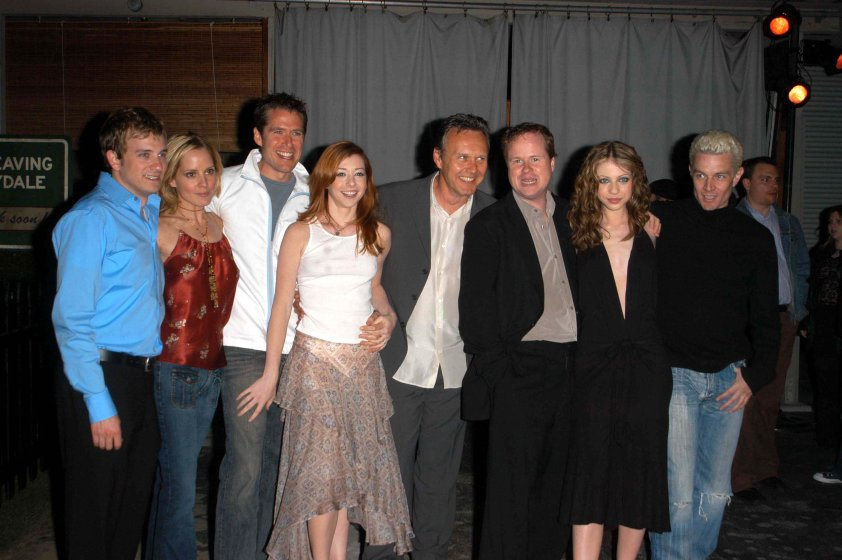
Head with the cast of Buffy the Vampire Slayer in 2003

In 1997 he was cast as Adam Klaus, the arrogant magician in Jonathan Creek. However, he only appeared in the pilot episode ("The Wrestler's Tomb"), as he then left to take on the role of Rupert Giles in Buffy the Vampire Slayer. While playing this role he lived in the United States during the late 1990s and early 2000s, although his family continued to live in the UK. Head left the regular cast of Buffy during the show's sixth season and subsequently appeared several times as a guest star until the conclusion of the series.

=== 2000s: Mainstream success ===
In 2002, he co-starred in the BBC Two television series Manchild, a show revolving around four friends approaching their fifties who try to recapture their fading youth and vitality while dealing with life as 'mature' men. That same year, he released the album Music for Elevators in collaboration with George Sarah. He also appeared in guest roles in various other dramas, such as Silent Witness, Murder Investigation Team and Spooks.

In 2003, he appeared in the fourth series of the British hit sitcom My Family, playing one of the main characters' (Abi's) father in the episode "May the Best Man Win". He was featured as the prime minister in the BBC comedy sketch show Little Britain from 2003 to 2005, and guest starred in several episodes of the 2004 series of drama Monarch of the Glen.

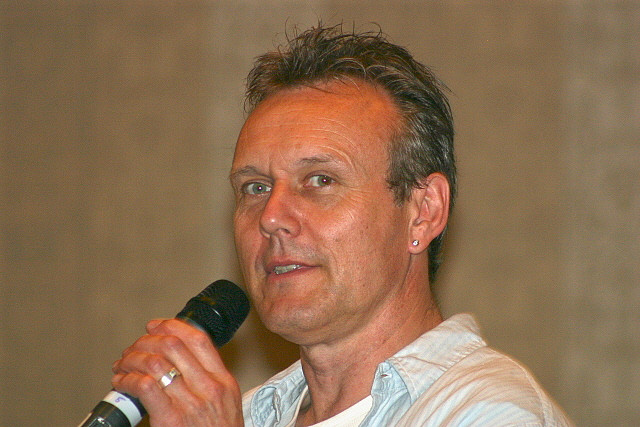
Head in 2005

In 2001, he appeared in a special webcast version of Doctor Who, a story called Death Comes to Time, in which he played the Time Lord Valentine. He also guest starred in the Excelis Trilogy, a series of Doctor Who audio adventures produced by Big Finish Productions, and in 2005 narrated the two-part documentary Project: WHO?, detailing the television revival of the series, for BBC Radio 2, and released to CD in 2006 by BBC Audio.

In April 2006 he appeared as a school's alien headmaster, Mr. Finch, in an episode of the second series entitled "School Reunion". Soon after, he recorded an abridged audiobook of the Doctor Who novel The Nightmare of Black Island by Mike Tucker. He narrated the third and fourth series of Doctor Who Confidential. He also voiced the character Baltazar, Scourge of the Universe, an evil space pirate searching for the Infinite, in the first-ever animated Doctor Who special, "The Infinite Quest". Head had previously auditioned for the role of the Eighth Doctor for the 1996 television film, but lost out to Paul McGann.

In early 2006, he appeared in an episode of Hotel Babylon, a BBC One drama set in a hotel, in which he played a suicidal man who recovers and lands a music deal. The same year he filmed a pilot for a new show entitled Him and Us, loosely based on the life of openly gay rock star Elton John, for American TV channel ABC, co-starring Kim Cattrall. In July he appeared as Captain Hook at the Children's Party at the Palace, a live pantomime staged in the grounds of Buckingham Palace as part of Queen Elizabeth II's 80th birthday celebrations. In October 2006, he voiced Ponsonby, leader of MI6, in Destroy All Humans! 2.

At San Diego Comic-Con in 2007, Joss Whedon said talks were almost completed for a 90-minute Buffy the Vampire Slayer spin-off, Ripper, as a BBC special, with both Head and the BBC on board, though this did not come to fruition. In 2007, he portrayed Stockard Channing's gay brother in the English film Sparkle, and appeared as Mr. Colubrine in the ITV1 comedy drama Sold. Head also appeared as Sir Walter Elliot in Persuasion. For this role, he was nominated for the Monte-Carlo TV Festival Award for Best Performance by an Actor in Television Films. Head also narrated a BBC behind-the-scenes programme for the American television series Heroes, Heroes Unmasked. He had also been seen as Maurice Riley in the BBC drama The Invisibles alongside Warren Clarke.

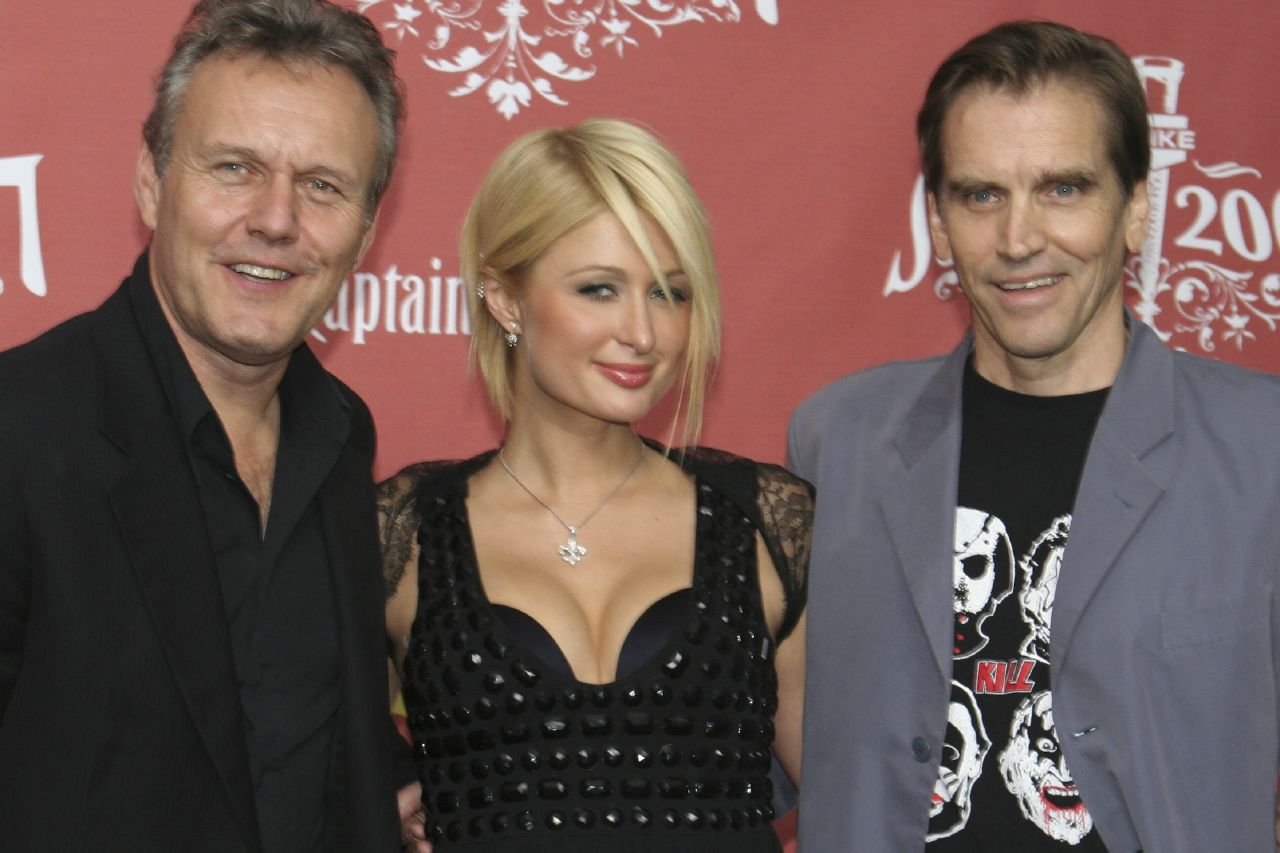
Head with Paris Hilton and Bill Moseley at the 2007 Scream Awards

After seeing Anthony Head in the Buffy musical episode, "Once More With Feeling", Saw director Darren Lynn Bousman cast him in his 21st century rock opera, Repo! The Genetic Opera. Head portrays an organ repossessor, employed by a fictional dystopian medical firm.

Head also performed for radio, taking two of the lead roles—arch-villain Mr. Gently Benevolent, and his descendant, journalist Jeremy Sourquill—in the BBC Radio 4 comedy series, Bleak Expectations (five series, 2007–12).

Head was part of the regular cast of the BBC drama series Merlin, about the mythical wizard Merlin. Head played King Uther Pendragon, the father of Prince Arthur.

=== 2010–2024: Later career and Ted Lasso ===
Head also provided voice-over work for the Nintendo Wii video game Flip's Twisted World, developed by Frozen North Productions. For his acting in the film Despite the Falling Snow he won the Best Supporting Actor award at the 2016 Prague Independent Film Festival. In 2012, Head released the single, "Cry", written by Marina Florance for the Oldie Composers Competition.

On radio, Head had a significant recurring role in the last two series (2011–13) of the Radio 4 sitcom Cabin Pressure as Hercules Shipwright, a romantic interest for the airline CEO played by Stephanie Cole, and returned for the show's two-part finale in 2014. Also in 2014, he released the album Staring at the Sun. In July 2018, Head was added to the cast of long‑running BBC radio soap-opera The Archers, playing Robin Fairbrother, a member of a family with several past and current connections to the Archers themselves.

From 2019, he played Bill in four episodes of Motherland with Anna Maxwell Martin and Diane Morgan. From 2020 to 2023, he played former Richmond F.C. owner Rupert Mannion, in Ted Lasso alongside Jason Sudeikis and Hannah Waddingham. For his role in the third season, Head was nominated alongside the rest of the cast for the Screen Actors Guild Award for Outstanding Performance by an Ensemble in a Comedy Series.

Head reprised his role as Giles in the Audible exclusive audio series Slayers: A Buffyverse Story alongside his former Buffy co-stars James Marsters, Charisma Carpenter, Amber Benson, Juliet Landau, Emma Caulfield Ford, James Charles Leary and Danny Strong. The series was released in October 2023.

In his final roles, Head appeared as Lord Sheffield in an episode of the second season of Bridgerton (2022) and as Julian Marx in the Amazon Prime Video film Upgraded (2024).

== Personal life and death ==
Head met his partner, Sarah Fisher, in 1982. She was an animal-welfare advocate. Head and Fisher never married owing to her indifference to marriage, but Head considered the pair to be a married couple. The two remained together until Fisher's death in December 2025. They had two daughters, Emily and Daisy, both of whom are actresses. The couple lived at Tilley Farm, Farmborough, a 90-acre (36 ha) property on the outskirts of Bath, Somerset.

Head died on 1 June 2026 from complications of pneumonia, aged 72. His daughters publicly announced the death on 5 June.

Following his death, various Buffy co-stars paid tribute to Head. Ted Lasso co-star and writer Brett Goldstein said that Head was a "brilliant actor who played the worst person in the world which was an incredible skill because he was the best person". The series episode "Mae Rides the Bus" pays a tribute to him. The New York Times noted Head as a "mainstay of influential television shows".

== Discography ==
- “Don't Pay the Ferryman” (track on “The Getaway” album, 1982) - Head has a minor speaking role in the bridge of this song, quoting a passage from The Tempest.
- Face in the Window – EP (1983 album) with the band Two Way
- "Sweet Transvestite" (1991 single) Chrysalis Records, 7-inch single, 12-inch single, CD single, and shaped picture CD
- Once More, with Feeling (2001 album) Buffy the Vampire Slayer
- Music for Elevators (2002 album) in collaboration with George Sarah
- "Cry" (2012 single) written by Marina Florance for the Oldie Composers Competition
- Staring at the Sun (2014 album) solo album of both covers and original work

== Awards and nominations ==
Year	Award	Category	Work	Result	Ref.
2001	Academy of Science Fiction, Fantasy & Horror Films	Best Supporting Actor on Television	Buffy the Vampire Slayer	Nominated	
2007	Monte-Carlo TV Festival	Best Performance by an Actor - Television Films	Persuasion	Nominated	
2016	Prague Independent Film Festival	Best Supporting Actor	Despite the Falling Snow	Won	
2024	Screen Actors Guild Awards	Outstanding Performance by an Ensemble in a Comedy Series	Ted Lasso	Nominated	
