= Heroes Unmasked =

- Narrated by: Anthony Head (2007–2008); Martin Freeman (2007); Santiago Cabrera (2008)
- Country of origin: United Kingdom
- No. of episodes: 46

Production
- Running time: 15 minutes 8 minutes (series 1 episodes 1, 11, 21, series 2 episode 2); 65 minutes (series 1, episode 22)

Original release
- Network: BBC Two
- Release: 25 July 2007 – 22 December 2008

Related
- Heroes

Heroes Unmasked is a behind-the-scenes documentary television series of the American television series Heroes, made by the BBC and narrated by Anthony Head in series 1–2, and in series 3 by former Heroes actor Santiago Cabrera. The show aired after an episode was shown on BBC Two, with one special episode that aired on a Saturday to coincide with the Heroes Catch-Up Weekend, through seasons one and two and for the "volume three" episodes of season three. A 65-minute special, narrated by Martin Freeman, accompanied the season one finale in addition to the usual episode of Unmasked, and an extra episode of usual length was broadcast a week before season two began.

The show features interviews with cast and crew members as well as special effects artists discussing the process behind the creation of each episode as well as revealing plot backgrounds and future stories. It is filmed entirely on location at the current set used for the television show in the United States and is another incarnation of the format already used by the BBC for Doctor Who Confidential and Torchwood Declassified.

First aired on 25 July 2007 on BBC Two following the first double episode of Heroes, the show attracted 3.1 million viewers. Discussion on the show is also carried over onto Heroes - the official Radio Show on BBC7. There is an episode of Unmasked for all Heroes showings (one shorter episode was made for each of the three double episodes in season 1) during its run, except season two's "Truth & Consequences". Unmasked did not return for Volume 4.

== Overseas broadcast ==
In Hong Kong, the show has aired after the SD premiere run of Heroes on TVB Pearl

In Australia, it was shown after new episodes of Heroes premiered on Sci Fi.
