= The True Creator =

Studio album by D!v!s!on #9
- Released: July 23, 1996
- Studio: DAMn! Studios
- Genre: Electronic
- Length: 66:22
- Label: Full Contact
- Producer: Mick Hale

D!v!s!on #9 chronology
The True Creator (1996)	Dub N Bass: Omen II (1997)

The True Creator is the debut studio album of D!v!s!on #9, released on July 23, 1996, by Full Contact Records. The track "Dub Altar" was contributed to the 1996 various artists compilation Echo, released by the same label.

== Reception ==
In reviewing The True Creator, Aiding & Abetting said "this stuff doesn't get dull" and "Division #9 has done a fine job of traversing the wide expanses of the electronic music universe to craft these pieces." A critic at babysue called the album "minimal, rhythmic electronic heaven" and "the result is a very sensual, sexy batch of tunes that can either be listened to or played as background music."

A lukewarm response came from Sonic Boom, who commended the musical diversity in the compositions but claimed "it is nothing altogether new or innovative, but it something that Mick has never been able to do in the past and as a result his musical growth has more than shown through."

== Track listing ==
All tracks are written by Mick Hale

No.	Title	Length
1.	"The True Creator"	6:03
2.	"Fall Down"	5:21
3.	"One Five Fore!"	4:52
4.	"Need Love (Everybody)"	11:41
5.	"See the Light"	5:54
6.	"Time Behind"	5:19
7.	"Allah Wait 4 Jah"	7:49
8.	"Dub Altar"	10:20
9.	"Number Nine"	9:03

== Personnel ==
Adapted from the liner notes of The True Creator.

D!v!s!on #9

- Mick Hale – instruments, production

Production and design

- Alan Douches – mastering
- Zalman Fishman – executive-producer
- Modern Design – design
- Shred (as Shred UK) – engineering

== Release history ==
Region	Date	Label	Format	Catalog
United States	1996	Full Contact	CD	9868–63227
