= Consenting Guinea Pig =

EP by T.H.C.
- Released: November 26, 1996
- Studios: Institute of Gizmology (Anaheim, California)
- Genres: Electronic; trip hop
- Length: 30:24
- Label: Full Contact
- Producer: George Sarah

T.H.C. chronology
Death by Design (1996)	Consenting Guinea Pig (1996)	Adagio (1999)

Consenting Guinea Pig is the EP by T.H.C., released on November 26, 1996 by Full Contact Records.

== Reception ==
In their review of Consenting Guinea Pig, Aiding & Abetting compared the band favorably to Ob1 and Virtualizer, commended the band's blend of EDM with trip hop and stated that "not many folks do this stuff better." A critic at Sonic Boom was negative in his review towards the album, calling it "a derivative project" and "nothing more than a minimalistic collection of rather bland bass and percussion."

== Track listing ==
No.	Title	Lyrics	Music	Length
1.	"Consenting Guinea Pig"	George Sarah; Timothy Wiles	George Sarah; Timothy Wiles	6:26
2.	"Sinkhole"	Sarah	Sarah	0:40
3.	"Need to Destroy"	Sarah Folkman	Sarah	4:07
4.	"Researching Sleep"	Sarah	Sarah	6:22
5.	"Coexistance"	Sarah	Sarah	5:20
6.	"Need to Destroy" (Bigod 20 Mix)	Folkman	Sarah	7:29

== Personnel ==
Adapted from the Consenting Guinea Pig liner notes.

T.H.C.

- George Sarah – instruments, producer, recording (1, 2)

Additional performers

- Sarah Folkman – vocals (3)
- Thomas Franzmann (as Zip Campisi) – remixer (6)

Production and design

- Zalman Fishman – executive-producer
- Wrex Mock – mastering
- Timothy Wiles (as Q) – recording (1, 4, 5), engineering (3), additional programming (4, 5),

== Release history ==
Region	Date	Label	Format	Catalog
United States	1996	Full Contact	CD	9868-63245
