= Cryptovision Records =

Cryptovision Records is a New York City based independent record label that was founded by musicians James Talley, Mike Linn, Brian Beggs, and Gene Wood in 1979 and dissolved in 1990. In 2009 Dave Amels, A&R man for the original Cryptovision Records, restarted the record label in New Jersey as Cryptovision Records LLC.

Cryptovision Records helped start the career of Sam Coomes with his group The Donner Party. Coomes went on to form Quasi and play guitar for Elliott Smith.

Cryptovision Records' debut release for their restart of the record label in 2009 is Dennis Diken with Bell Sound - "Late Music".

== Discography ==
=== Singles and EPs ===
- Deprogrammers - Midas Touch/Grim Reaper - 1981 - 7" - C-1001
- Stepford Husbands - Why Aren't You There/Yeah - 1984 - 7" - BR-1000-11-1
- Deprogrammers - Fear Of Success - 1985 - 12" - CR-2001
- Stepford Husbands - Rode Out/Seeing is Believing - 1985 - 7" - CR-300
- Flying Color - Look My Way/Dear Friend - 1985 - 7" - CR-400
- Desolation Angels - Border Patrol/Poison Streets - 1985 - 7" - CR-500
- Distraction Boys - Pay Off the Cops/Have a Nice Day/Home on the Missile Range - 1985 - 7" - CR-600
- Mod Fun - Mary Goes Round/Grounded - 1986 - 7" - CR-700
- Optic Nerve - Ain't That a Man/Mayfair/Happy Ever After - 1986 - 7" - CR-800
- Optic Nerve - Leaving Yesterday Behind/Kiss Her Goodbye - 1987 - 7" - CR-810
- Stepford Husbands - Seems Like Years/Kwik Way - 1988 - 7" - CR-310
- Black Orchids - Lunatics Ball - 1988 - 7" - CR-900
- Contact Obsession - Because It Seemed/The Other Side/The Same Obsession - 1989 - 7" - CR-1100
- Sultrees - Take Me As I Am/Contrails - 1990 - 7" - CR-1000
- Stepford Husbands - Building of Love For Sale/Bag Man/Tick Tock - 1990 - 7" - CR-320

=== Albums ===
- The Lyon in Winter - As Winter Falls - 1986 - 12" - CRL-1300
- Mod Fun - Dorothy's Dream - 1986 - 12" - CRL-1000
- Various Artists - Please Don't Adjust Your Set... - 1986 - 12" - CRL-1100
- The Stepford Husbands - New Ways of Seeing - 1987 - 12" - CRL-1200
- The Donner Party - Donner Party - 1987 - 12" - CRL-1400
- The Corvairs - Rio Blanco - 1987 - 12" - CRL-1600
- Hector Penalosa - Hector - 1988 - 12" - CRL-1700
- Various Artists - Havoc from Holland - 1989 - 12" - CRL-1800
- Dennis Diken with Bell Sound - Late Music - 2009 - CD - CRC-3000

== See also ==
- List of record labels
