= Mick Hale =

American songwriter

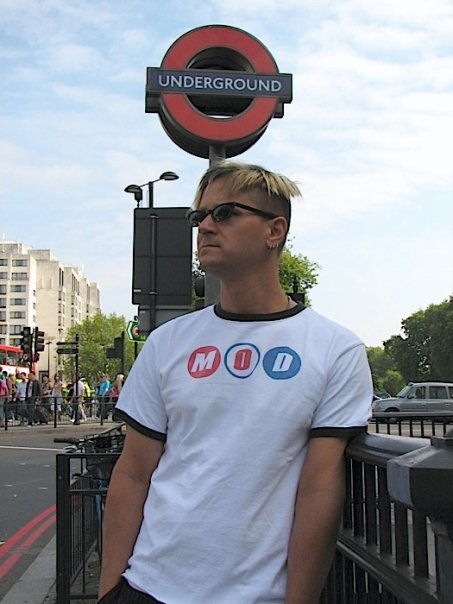
- Mick Hale, London 2009

Background information
- Also known as: Mick London
- Origin: New Jersey
- Genres: House, tribal house, pop, EDM, EBM, electro, garage, dub
- Years active: 1984-present
- Labels: Swishcraft Music, Metropolis, SPV GmbH, Fifth Colvmn, Semaphore GmbH, Sub/Mission Italy, Midnight NYC, Get Hip, Cryptovision, SNAP! Records, Madrid
- Member of: Croc Shop, Mod Fun
- Website: www.djmickhale.com

Mick Hale is an American musician, songwriter, producer, remixer, DJ, and graphic artist. Credited on over three dozen commercial releases, his body of work spans over 30 years, from 1984 onwards.

== DJ, writer, and graphic artist ==
Hale began his DJ career in the mid-1980s as a guest on the college radio stations WPRB, Princeton and WRSU, New Brunswick. His focus ran from Motown/Stax soul and Trojan dub reggae sounds to 1960s British psychedelic pop and various indie alternative of the day. Subsequently, he found himself invited to spin at clubs such as Maxwell's in Hoboken and other NYC-area Dives. By the early 1990s Hale's musical focus had grown to encompass house, electro, tribal house, new beat, jungle, and techno. From 1991 to 1998 Hale found himself employed 3-nites a week at New Brunswick's The Roxy as the head resident DJ. Hale then moved on to residencies at both The Melody and Ground Zero in the late 1990s into the early 2000s. During this same period, Hale was invited to contribute a column to Jersey Beat magazine called "Danse Assembly" (reviewing electronic & alternative dance music.) "Danse Assembly" (a.k.a. "DAMn!") also eventually became the title of a fanzine he published until 2002, acting as both writer and editor/graphic designer. From there, he went on to design many CD covers for the Philadelphia-based record labels Metropolis and Pendragon, as well as designing for NJ's Tinman. Hale interviewed many electronic artists during this period and also contributed many dance music reviews to other fanzines such as Fusion and The Splatter Effect.

Private events and guest DJ gigs in the Tri-state area between 2002 and 2010 allowed Hale to keep his foot in the dance music field until 2010 when he finally landed a new residency with Asbury Park's "Swell" niteclub. Many Asbury nite-club engagements followed, which eventually led to a 13-month residency beginning in 2012 at Shep Pettibone's "Paradise" nite-club. Hale continued doing occasional remix and film soundtrack work and also contributed articles to the local "arts weekly" publication the "TriCity News." Both NYC's Odyssey Magazine and The Beacon Lite's People's Choice Award named Hale "Best NJ DJ" in 2015; and an article in the Asbury Park Press proclaimed Hale one (of just three,) "DJ's to catch in Asbury!" In June 2016, Hale was hired as a resident DJ at "The Asbury" the newest hotel in Asbury Park, which was named by USA Today "Best New Hotel, 2017." He currently spins Tea Dance monthly there as well as his weekly residency at Georgie's Bar's popular "Tempted Tuesday," which has been running 9 years now. He has also spun the Rainbow Mountain Resort (in the Poconos, PA) many times, as well as the Circuit party events "SandBlast," "Ascension," "Bear Weekend" and with the "RSVP Cruise line."

== Band history ==
Hale got his start as the guitarist/singer and songwriter/producer with New Jersey/New York City garage band Mod Fun. From 1983 to 1987 he guided the band through a musical evolution from mod/punk to a more polished, energetic pop sound. In the process, Hale (who used the moniker "London" at the time,) contributed to 5 releases as Mod Fun, and appeared on many compilations in the US and UK. After two American and one European tour with Mod Fun in 1987, Mick and drummer (future Rolling Stone editor,) Jim DeRogatis were invited by the legendary 1970s British Art-punks Wire to have their Wire cover-band "The Ex-Lion Tamers" tour the US and Canada as the support-act. While the members of Wire were performing new "alternative dance" material from The Ideal Copy Mick and company would open the show by playing the entire classic Pink Flag album, in order.

In 1987 Mick and former Mod Fun bandmate Bobby "Werner" Strete teamed with the psychedelic act Lord John's drummer and formed a new outfit known as Crocodile Shop. Drawing on heavier and dark-pop influences such as The Jesus and Mary Chain and Skinny Puppy, this new band was a definite departure from the jangly, guitar-driven sound that Hale had produced earlier. Their first release is the hard to find EP entitled "Head," (which MTV's 120 Minutes labeled "Sickly Psychedelic.") This original trio then worked closely with producer Dave Fielding of The Chameleons UK on their follow-up LP "Lullaby," released on a Twin Cities based label in 1988. As with Mod Fun Hale also saw to it that Crocodile Shop evolved as a musical unit with each new release. After a brief reunion with drummer Chris Collins, the group opted to use samples and drum machines for their subsequent work. Original member Bobby "Werner" Strete continued working with Hale thru many lineup changes until 1997, at which point they had combined forces with keyboardist/programmer v.Markus. By 2004 the group had toured all over the US, Canada & Germany and released some 15 CD's on American, German and Italian labels which explored styles ranging from electro-industrial to techno-electronica and synth-pop which still permeates the group's sound to this day (now known simply as Croc Shop).

The 2004 release of Croc Shop's double CD retrospective "S.E.A. (Self-Extracting Archive)" coincided with a re-release by Pittsburgh's Get Hip Records of the Mod Fun retrospective CD called "Past... Forward." Many of the original members of both bands reunited for a release party for these discs. The positive vibe among Hale, Strete and Collins coupled with the timeliness of the Mod Fun CD re-release ultimately led to the reformation of that band for another 6-year run. Mod Fun went on to perform in Nashville, Chicago, Baltimore, Philadelphia, DC and all over their NYC/NJ home-base. In addition, the reunited Mod Fun released a double CD in June 2007. Entitled "Now...and Again", which contained 10 new tracks and 10 re-recordings of Mod Fun classics from their 1980s vinyl catalogue. In 2010 Mod Fun released another CD entitled "Futurepresent" with 15 new tracks.

== Side projects and remixes ==
Hale's latest single "Just Tell Me/Take It Back" was issued to all digital platforms 7 December 2021, on the long-running San Francisco dance label Swishcraft (distributed by The Orchard/Sony Music.) In the mid 90's Hale began producing electronic 'solo' projects such as D!v!s!on No. 9 (with 2 critically acclaimed CDs of techno-house-dub,) proGREX.iv (a drum N bass, east-coast meets west-coast collaboration,) and "Hand Of God" (electro-goth,) all 3 with full-length CDs released on DC and New Brunswick based labels. Hale and Croc Shop cohort v.Markus also worked together on a drum 'N bass project "Genetik, " which never saw light of day; tho many of the duo's remixes of other EDM artists were released (credited to Crocodile Shop.) To this day, Hale continues to remix other artists and has a SoundCloud page with many mixes available as free downloads. In March 2019, Hale recorded a 4-song EP of electronic/vocal/house music, which is the first to be released under his own name (titled "Hale Haus.") He composed and produced the material with all the vocals contributed by local Asbury Park singer, Laraé. The EP is available on Apple iTunes, Amazon, Spotify, among other online outlets. As of August 2020 Hale has released 3 more Dance Music singles: a house cover of Bobby Caldwell's 70's Pop hit "What You Wont Do," and originals "A: Groovy Manifesto" and "Music On My Mind." Also released in early 2020 was a 9-song album "Maus Steckt Im Haus," recorded during the height of the Coronavirus "C19" lockdown.
