= D!v!s!on No. 9 =

Canadian electronic music project

D!v!s!on #9
- Origin: New Brunswick, Canada
- Genre: Electronic
- Years active: 1996–1997
- Labels: Full Contact; Tinman
- Past members: Mick Hale

D!v!s!on #9 (or Division #9) was the name of an electronic music project founded by composer Mick Hale and based in New Brunswick. Hale debuted with the studio album The True Creator in 1996 followed with Dub N Bass: Omen II in 1997.

== History ==
D!v!s!on #9 was created in 1996 by New Brunswick-based composer Mick Hale. Later that year D!v!s!on #9 released The True Creator on Full Contact Records. Hale drew from his electro music influences such as Aphex Twin, Cabaret Voltaire, Clock DVA and Lassique Bendhaus and to shape his ambient, jungle and trance compositions. The band released "Dub Altar" on the 1996 Full Contact Records various artists compilation Echo. After the bankruptcy of Fifth Colvmn Records, Mick Hale decided to release the second album, titled Dub N Bass: Omen II, on Tinman. The compositions featured a more prominent use of vocal samples, keyboard driven atmosphere and sound layering compared to his debut effort. The track "Omen II" was released on the various artists compilation Empire One, also released by Tinman.

== Discography ==
Studio albums

- The True Creator (1996, Full Contact)
- Dub N Bass: Omen II (1997, Tinman)
