= Crocodile Shop =

German EBM band

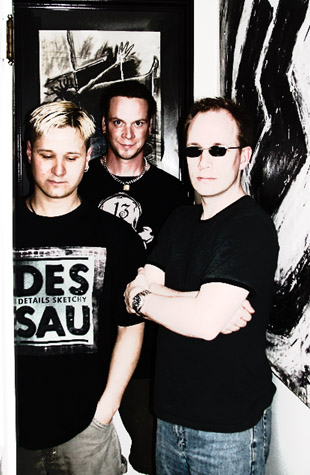

Background information
- Origin: New Jersey, U.S.A. Berlin, Germany
- Genres: Electro-Industrial; Dark Electro
- Years active: 1987–present
- Labels: Tinman Records; Metropolis Records; Out of Line Music
- Members: Mick Hale; R.A. Werner (Bob Strete); vMarkus; Len9; John Figlar; Chris Collins

Crocodile Shop (later simply Croc Shop) is an electro-industrial aggrotech EBM band formed in Berlin, Germany in 1987 by Mick Hale and R. A. Werner from New Jersey.

== History ==
Crocodile Shop was formed after Hale and Werner ended their previous new wave project, Mod Fun. They became inspired by the "darker" post-punk sounds of Joy Division, New Order, Wire, Red Lorry Yellow Lorry and The Jesus and Mary Chain, which deviated from the styles that other members of the band favored. Over a two week period during a European tour the band fell apart, clearing the way for Hale and Werner to start a new band. According to the band's official website, the name "Crocodile Shop" was just something the group entitled a demo tape as a reminder of its contents, and the name stuck.

Originally a three-piece band (guitar, bass and drums) with drummer John Figlar of Lord John fame, the group's first release was the 1987 EP entitled "Head" released on the Minneapolis-based Susstones Records. At the time, the group had a strong indie rock sound which they rapidly evolved from; eventually referring to "Head" as their version of Ministry's "With Sympathy" which was unrepresentative of the band. The following full-length album "Lullaby", produced by Chameleons UK's Dave Fielding, developed their overall sound further towards gothic and included more dark guitar work. Eventually, the band would also slowly abandon the "guitar goth" sound, first replacing their drummer with a drum machine, releasing the Red Lorry Yellow Lorry influenced "Measure By Measure" EP and then finally with the addition of keyboard player V. Markus, (who was influenced by the likes of Front 242, Laibach and Nitzer Ebb), they turned to an entirely electronic-based outfit. The band followed up with the fully electro-industrial sounding EP "Technological Optimism".

Crocodile Shop's debut on CD came about in 1993 with the release of the album "Celebrate the Enemy" on Tinman Records. The album, produced by Chris Randall of Wax Trax! Records and Sister Machine Gun, was a clean blend of the latest electro-sounds and mixed elements of trance, break-beat, and EBM. An Alternative Press review described the work as "a hard and harsh blend of high energy rock with the melodic aspects of electro and the high angst of industrialism." The album was followed up by the remix EP "Crush Your Enemies" which was also praised on the dance floor.

In 1995, Crocodile Shop signed to Metropolis Records and continued to expand their repertoire releasing the full-length albums "Beneath" in 1996 and "Pain" in 1997. The remix EPs "Metalwerks" and "Soviet" also followed the studio albums. Also released was "Live Action", a 777-copy limited edition live performance recorded in Germany and distributed on SubMission/SPV label.

As the band's popularity in the electro-underground grew, Mick Hale began working on other side projects releasing two electro-dub albums under the name Division #9, and teaming up with V. Markus as progGREX.iv. The band had also gone on to produce remixes for such artists as Collide, Battery, and Android Lust.

After extensive tours over the next few years, in 1999, the band recruited new member Len9 and changed their musical direction once again. With Len9's influences and taking advantage of the newest and more affordable synthesizer technology that was out there, the door opened for new possibilities in their sound. They released "Everything is Dead and Gone" which was followed in 2000 by "Order + Joy", under the shortened name Croc Shop. (The album's title is a play off two of the group's original influences: New Order and Joy Division). Belgium's SIDE-LINE magazine called "Order + Joy" Crocodile Shop's "best album ever", hailing it as a return to their earlier and gritter EBM sound. "Order + Joy" was followed by the remix EP "Wrong" which was released on CD and distributed exclusively through their website.

In 2002, the band released "World" which, while continuing much of the EBM sound of "Order + Joy", represented another shift in the music style to a cleaner Synth Pop vibe. While the band embarked on another tour they released a remix EP for "World" called "Translated", and again, it saw exclusive distribution over the internet. In 2004, they released the 2 cd best of "CS_Sea: Self Extracting Archive" with 37 tracks covering all their releases, after which they took a long break and returned with the "Resist!" full length in 2020; followed almost immediately by another 30-song collection entitled "The Rest In Pieces," featuring nearly all the back catalogue tracks that did not appear on "CS_Sea." These latest releases can both be found at all the streaming online outlets.

The band has in the past shared the stage with such acts as Nitzer Ebb, Front 242, Project Pitchfork, Switchblade Symphony and Rammstein.

== Discography ==
=== Albums ===
- Lullaby - LP (1988) Susstones
- Celebrate the Enemy - CD (1994) Tinman
- Beneath - CD (1996) Metropolis
- Pain - CD (1997) Metropolis
- Everything is Dead and Gone - CD (1999) Metropolis – #39 CMJ RPM Charts

As Croc Shop

- Order + Joy - CD (2000) Metropolis
- World - CD (2002) Metropolis
- Resist! - Digital (2020) DAMN!
- Perpetual Sequence - Digital (2021) Metropolis

EPs

- Head - 12" (1987) Susstones
- Measure By Measure - 7" (1989) Susstones
- Technological Optimism - 12" DAMN!
- Celebrate the Enemy - 12" (1993) Danse Assembly Productions
- Crush Your Enemies - CD (1995) Tinman
- Metalwerks - CD (1997) Out of Line
- Soviet - CD (1998) Tinman

Compilations

- Self Extracting Archive - 1987-2004 - A Collection - 2xCD (2004) DAMN!

=== Compilation appearances ===
- It's Midnight Xmess Part III - LP side #2 track #2 "December Mourning" (1987) Midnight Records
- Rivet Head Culture - CD track #17 "Growing Stronger (Steroid Mix)" (1993) If It Moves...
- There Is No Time - 4xCD disc #4 track #7 "Celebrate the Enemy" (1995) Ras Dva Records
- Sound-Line Vol. 4 - CD track #10 "Growing Stronger (The Fuhs Remix)" (1997) Side-Line
- 100 Tears - A Tribute to The Cure - CD track #7 "Let's Go to Bed" (1997) Cleopatra
- Awake the Machines - On the Line Vol. 2 - 2xCD disc #1 track #2 "Blinding" (1997) Out of Line, Sub/Mission Records
- Bodyhorst's Popshow - CD track #7 "Some Nothing" (1997) Zoth Ommog Records
- Vertigo Compilation 01/1997' - CD track #9 "High and Deep" (1997) Celtic Circle Productions
- Empire One - CD track #1 Celebrate the Enemy, track #8 "Soviet (Colder)", and track #16 "Grey Day Reign" (1998) Tinman Records
- Hymns of the Warlock - A Tribute to Skinny Puppy - CD track #7 "The Choke" (1998) Cleopatra, Synthetic Symphony
- Sounds from the Asylum 1 - CD track #12 "Funeral March (SMP Remix)" (1998) Base Asylum
- Five Years of Electronic Tears - 2xCD disc #2 track #10 "Waiting Game" (1999) Cyberware Productions
- Metropolis 1999 - CD track #9 "Core" (1999) Metropolis
- Base Asylum - Sounds form the Asylum Two - 2xCD disc #2 track #1 "Useless (Sanity's Edge Remix)" (2000) Base Asylum
- Critical M@55 - CD track #13 "Order + Joy (Dessau Remix)" (2000) Metropolis
- Cryonica Tanz V.1 - 2xCD disc #2 track #6 "New Ideal (UK Remix)" (2000) Cryonica Music
- Electropolis: Volume 2 - CD track #6 "Order + Joy (Exclusive Remix)" (2000) Metropolis
- Essential Industrial Masters - 3xCD disc #3 track #7 "The Choke" (2001) Big Eye Music
- Critical M@55 Volume 4 - CD (listed as Croc Shop) track #6 "World (Global Mix)" 2001 Metropolis
- Tinman 21 - Promo CD track #2 World, and track #9 "Higher" (2002) Tinman Records
- Futronik Structures 4 - CD (listed as Croc Shop) track #5 "Nu Precedence" (2003) DSBP Records
- Interbreeding II: Industrial Mutation - 2xCD (listed as Croc Shop) disc #2 track #13 "Hide (V 1.3)" (2003) BLC Productions
- Fully Automated: The Headache Remixes - CD (listed as Croc Shop) track #4 "Generation (2nd Generation Mix)" (2004) Uncoiled Loops Production
- State of Synthpop 2005 - 6xCD (listed as Croc Shop) disc #5 track #2 "Safe Harbour" (2005) A Different Drum
