= George Sarah =

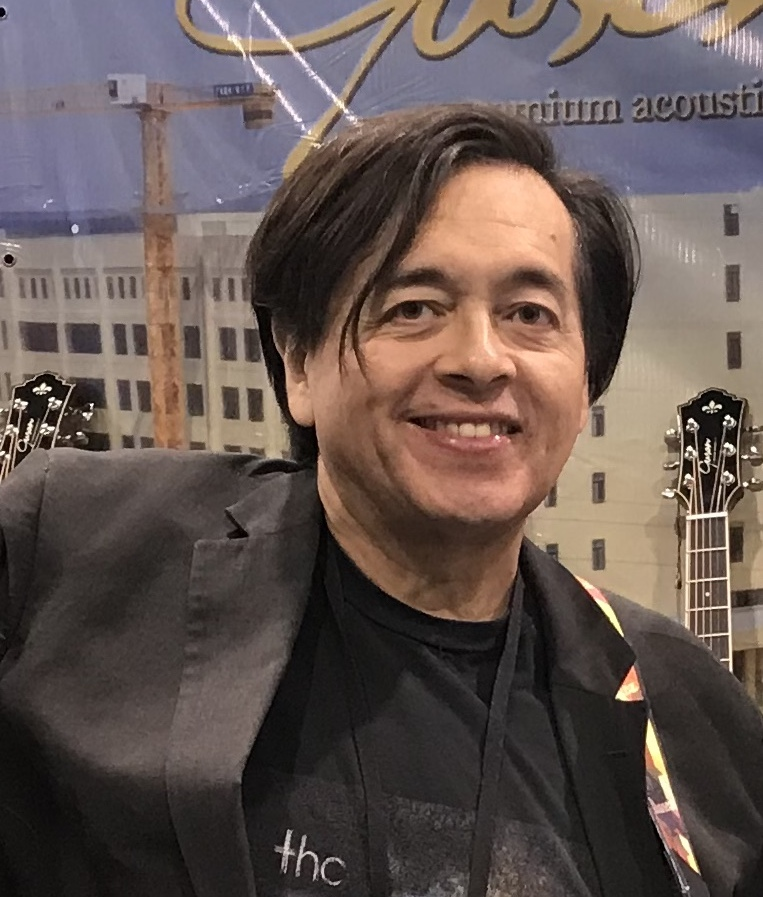
- George Sarah at 2025 NAMM show

Background information
- Born: George Shimeall; Seoul, South Korea
- Origin: Los Angeles, California
- Genres: Electronic music, modern classical, film score, downtempo, industrial, goth, trip hop, drum'n'bass, ambient, deep listening
- Years active: 1988–present
- Formerly of: T.H.C., Stereotaxic Device

George Shimeall, known professionally by his stage name George Sarah, is an American composer, based in Los Angeles, California.

== History ==
George Sarah rose to notoriety in the electronic music scene with Stereotaxic Device, a band he was in from 1988 until 1992, when he began his solo career under the moniker T.H.C., which he used until 1999.

In 2000, Sarah's demo, "Sonata for Petra," reached No. 1 on the influential L.A. radio station KCRW. The following year, he was invited by Nic Harcourt, along with his string trio, for a live performance of his electronic chamber music on KCRW's Morning Becomes Eclectic.

In 2002, he recorded his CD "Music for Elevators," a collaboration with actor Anthony Stewart Head, whom he met when performing on season 4 of Buffy the Vampire Slayer.

In 2003, he released a CD of his compositions for the Discovery Health Channel, called "Ossia," consisting mostly of songs from the series Plastic Surgery: Before and After for Original Productions. The CD was the No. 1 add on CMJ's RPM chart on May 5, 2003. and was nominated for best electronic song in a TV series by the American Dance Music Awards. Also in 2003, Sarah was named 'Best Electronic Artist in L.A.' by the readers of L.A. Alternative Press.

In 2007, Sarah's music was featured in several prominent projects including the documentary, Bra Boys: Blood Is Thicker than Water. Narrated by Russell Crowe, The Emmy nominated special Addiction on HBO weaving several of George's songs throughout the episode. Chris Rock's TV series Everybody Hates Chris and CSI: Crime Scene Investigation.

Sarah was commissioned by the Mother New York advertising agency to compose the music for 'Terracotta Warriors,' a daily performance of an outdoor advertisement for Johnson & Johnson Products at the Beijing Olympics in August 2008. The 14-minute score accompanied a performance featuring the Beijing Modern Dance Company and 23-foot tall marionettes designed and choreographed by Poetic Kinetics at the China Millennium Monument.

Sarah premiered an original soundtrack to Carl Dreyer's 1928 silent film The Passion of Joan of Arc on August 10, 2010, at Grand Performances in Downtown Los Angeles. His composition featured a string quartet and a choir of four singers from the Los Angeles Master Chorale, who performed under the conduction of Sarah and accompanied by his electronic instrumentation. As of 2025, Sarah performed over 25 live film screenings of The Passion of Joan of Arc with a live ensemble of strings, choir, and electronics.

In 2012, his album, "Who Sleep the Sleep of Peace", was released, featuring guests and collaborations with several artists: David J of Bauhaus and Love and Rockets; Angela McCluskey of Télépopmusik and Wild Colonials; Alain Whyte of Morrissey fame; James Fearnley of The Pogues; and Monique Powell of Save Ferris. The single "Anna" from the album, featuring vocals by McCluskey, was selected as KCRW's "Today's Top Tune" on April 6, 2011.

On February 18, 2014, Flat Field Records of Seattle will release Sarah's new CD entitled "Timelapse".

== Discography ==
=== Albums ===
- 1990 – Stereotaxic Device (as Stereotaxic Device) (KK Records)
- 1992 – 100 Per Day Extinct (as Stereotaxic Device) (KK Records)
- 1996 – Death by Design (as T.H.C.) (Fifth Colvmn Records)
- 1997 – Exempli Gratia (as Cathexis, with Dean DeBenedictus) (Hypnotic/Cleopatra Records)
- 1999 – Adagio (as T.H.C.) (Brain Surgery Music)
- 2001 – Opus Eleven (Beautiful Is As Beautiful Does)
- 2002 – Music for Elevators collaboration with Anthony Stewart Head (Beautiful Is As Beautiful Does)
- 2003 – Ossia (Transistor Recordings)
- 2012 – Who Sleep the Sleep of Peace (Pusan Music Group)
- 2014 – Timelapse (Flat Field Records)
- 2021 – Vicissitudes (Gothic Karen Recordings)

=== EPs and 12″ Singles ===
- 1991 – Lost Land (as Stereotaxic Device) (KK Records)
- 1996 – Consenting Guinea Pig (as T.H.C.) (Full Contact Records)
- 1997 – Reinvention Operation (as Pro Grex IV) (Fifth Colvmn Records)
- 1997 – Darjeeling (as T.H.C.) (Intelligent Recordings)
- 1998 – Blue Wave (as T.H.C.) (Intelligent Recordings)
- 1999 – Drag Ass (F-111 Records/Warner Bros. Records)
- 2003 – 1920 (Transistor Recordings)
- 2015 – Save Me Now Live at KCRW (Pusan Music Group)
- 2016 – Min And Elsa (Flat Field Records)
- 2020 – Campbient Volume One (as Campbient) (RealMoreReal Records)
- 2020 – The Four Player Model (as The Four Player Model) (RealMoreReal Records)
- 2025 – All of Us Here (featuring Angela McCluskey) (Gothic Karen Recordings)

=== Remixes ===
- 1999 – On the Outside by Information Society – from the CD Insoc Recombinant (Cleopatra Records)
- 1997 – Pandora's Box by Collide – from the LP Distort (Re-Constriction/Cargo Records)
