= Geko =

American gothic rock duo

- Origin: Los Angeles, California, US
- Genres: Gothic rock, alternative rock
- Years active: 1983–1992
- Labels: Open
- Members: Sarah Folkman; Carrie McNinch

Geko were a gothic rock duo based in Los Angeles. Formed in 1983, the band's nucleus comprised vocalist/bassist Sarah Folkman and guitarist Carrie McNinch. They released one full-length album, titled Join My Pretty World, in 1992 before disbanding.

== History ==
Geko was formed in 1983 by Sarah Folkman and Carrie McNinch, who were roommates and attending school at the time. Both were influenced by early death rock, rockabilly and punk rock. After a few years of performing live, the band recorded a six-song demo in the late eighties. The band issued their first proper release, the "Probing the Gash in Her Head 7", in 1991 for Open Records.

Produced with the help of prominent Los Angeles producer Earle Mankey, the band issued their sole full-length album Join My Pretty World in 1992. The album compiled previously recorded tracks with new recordings. Ned Raggett of allmusic called the band "sharply powerful" and the album was "rough, industrial-strength darkwave music that easily bears repeated listening."

The duo dissolved shortly after the release of their debut album. McNinch abandoned the music scene and began publishing comic zines including The Assassin and the Whiner, and Food Geek. Her mini comic You Don't Get There From Here is still being published regularly. McNinch also has work included in various anthologies, including QU33R, No Straight Lines: Four Decades of Queer Comics, Runner Runner, Tablegedden and multiple issues of Not My Small Diary. Her book I Want Everything to be Okay was published by Tugboat Press. Sarah Folkman collaborated with a number of bands, including Spiderworks, Vampire Rodents and proGREX.iv, before joining the trip hop band THC in 1997. She has since gained some recognition as a visual artist and illustrator.

== Discography ==
Studio albums

- Join My Pretty World (Open, 1992)

EP

- Probing the Gash in Her Head (Open, 1991)
