= T.H.C. (band) =

American trip hop band

- Also known as: THC, Shy (in Buffy)
- Origin: Los Angeles, California, USA
- Genres: Trip hop, electronica, drum and bass
- Years active: 1992–1999
- Labels: Fifth Colvmn Records (1996), Brain Surgery Music (1997–1999)
- Past members: George Sarah; Sarah Folkman; Jeremy Daw

T.H.C. was an American trip hop band from Los Angeles, California, formed by producer/composer/keyboardist/bassist George Sarah in 1992. Vocalist and lyricist Sarah Folkman joined the band officially in 1997, though she had been a guest collaborator since 1995.

== Biography ==
From 1992 to 1999 the band released two full-length albums, one E.P. and two 12 inch records. George disbanded the band to work on solo projects.

In 1995 George Sarah as T.H.C. signed with Fifth Colvmn records and released Death by Design in January 1996. The album consisted of hard techno and ambient electronic music. Half the album was co-produced by Q A.K.A. Uberzone. Later that year an EP was released titled Consenting Guinea Pig. In 1996 George Sarah toured the eastern USA on a three-week tour to perform both releases. In September of that year as T.H.C. George joined fellow Fifth Colvmn label mates 'Death Ride 69' performing bass on a 6-week tour supporting My Life With The Thrill Kill Kult across the U.S.A.

In 1997 San Diego base Intelligent Records released two T.H.C. 12" instrumentals produced and performed by George Sarah.

In 1998 Nettwerk Records flew both George and Sarah Folkman to Canada to record demo's for the label. The sessions were engineered by KMFDM Gunter Schultz. Later that year T.H.C. performed a two-week residency in Paris, France accompanied by a string trio (cello, viola, violin) which had become the live presentation of the band.

In 1999, Sarah and Folkman released a full-length album together called Adagio. The album consisted of a somber beauty of melancholic charged electronica, and marked a formal departure from the harsh techno/trance style of previous releases.

T.H.C. gained some recognition after their music appeared in a couple of episodes of Buffy the Vampire Slayer (as well as its spin-off, Angel), playing the part of the fictional band Shy, of whom Veruca was the vocalist. George Sarah also appeared on the show as Shy's keyboard player. George Sarah returned to Buffy the Vampire Slayer on season six in the episode Hells Bells along with his string section during the wedding ceremony. T.H.C also had their music appear in several films including The Curve directed by Dan Rosen and starring Matthew Lillard, Michael Vartan, and Keri Russell, Mascara directed by Linda Kandel and starring Ione Skye, Cleopatra’s second husband directed by Jon Reiss.

== Members ==
- Sarah Folkman — Vocals/Lyricist
- George Sarah — Electronic composer/Multi-instrumentalist

== Discography ==
=== Studio albums ===
- Death by Design – (1996, Full Contact)
- Adagio – (1999, Brain Surgery)

=== EPs ===
- Consenting Guinea Pig – (1996, Full Contact)

=== 12-inch records ===
- "Darjeeling" – (1997)
- "Blue Wave" – (1998)

=== Compilations ===
- Unsaid Warning L.A.Critical Mass (1998)
- Branded (Instrumental) KUCI BENEFIT (1998)
- Directly From Angels King of Vampires (1998)
- Tetanus Toxin World Wide Underground (1997)
- Mind Over Matter Ultimate Drum n' Bass (1997)
- Need To Destroy Fifth Column (1996)
- Sin-A-Matic Vol. 1 Svenhed (1994)
